= List of Northeastern Line (Thailand) stations =

List of railway stations on Thailand's Northeastern Line

The following is a list of Northeastern Line railway stations.

== Stations in operation ==
English name	Thai Name	Number Code	Distance in km	Class	Station Code	Note	Location
Bangkok - Thanon Chira Junction
Bangkok	กรุงเทพ	1001	0.00	Terminal	กท.		Bangkok
Yommarat	ยมราช	1002	2.17	Halt	ยช.	Wye connecting to the Eastern Line.	Bangkok
Ho Prajae Chit Lada (Chitralada)	หอประแจจิตรลดา	1003	3.29	Special Station	จล.	This station is for Chitralada Royal Villa. For royal use only.	Bangkok
Ramathibodi Hospital	โรงพยาบาลรามาธิบดี		3.3	Halt	รธ.		Bangkok
Sam Sen	สามเสน	1004	4.8	1	สส.		Bangkok
Bang Sue Junction	ชุมทางบางซื่อ	1007	7.47	1	บซ.	Has interchange to The Southern Line and can go to Phahonyothin Freight Terminal. Bang Sue Grand Station	Bangkok
Krung Thep Aphiwat Central Terminal	กรุงเทพอภิวัฒน์	1000		1	กภ.	Bangkok's new central station, opened in January 2023.	Bangkok
Don Mueang	ดอนเมือง	1017	22.21	1	ดม.	As of January 2023, long-distance trains continue to Krung Thep Aphiwat, ordinary and commuter trains continue to Bangkok (Hua Lamphong) via Bang Sue Junction.	Bangkok
Rangsit	รังสิต	1021	29.75	1	รต.		Pathum Thani
Khlong Nueng	คลองหนึ่ง	1223	33.84	Halt	ลห.		Pathum Thani
Chiang Rak	เชียงราก	1022	37.47	2	ชร.		Pathum Thani
Thammasat University	มหาวิทยาลัยธรรมศาสตร์	1230	40.19	Halt	ธส.		Pathum Thani
Nava Nakhon	นวนคร	1023	44.12	Halt	วะ.		Pathum Thani
Chiang Rak Noi	เชียงรากน้อย	1024	46.01	2	ชน.		Pathum Thani
Khlong Phutsa	คลองพุทรา	1026	51.88	3	พซ.		Phra Nakhon Si Ayutthaya
Bang Pa-In	บางปะอิน	1028	58.00	1	บอ.		Phra Nakhon Si Ayutthaya
Ban Pho	บ้านโพ	1029	62.75	3	บพ.		Phra Nakhon Si Ayutthaya
Ayutthaya	อยุธยา	1031	71.08	1	อย.		Phra Nakhon Si Ayutthaya
Ban Ma	บ้านม้า	1032	74.69	3	มา.		Phra Nakhon Si Ayutthaya
Map Phra Chan	มาบพระจันทร์	1033	78.98	3	บจ.		Phra Nakhon Si Ayutthaya
Ban Don Klang	บ้านดอนกลาง	1034	82.31	Halt	ลก.		Phra Nakhon Si Ayutthaya
Phra Kaeo	พระแก้ว	1035	85.44	3	พก.		Phra Nakhon Si Ayutthaya
Ban Phachi Junction	ชุมทางบ้านภาชี	1036	89.95	1	ภช.	Final station shared with the Northern Line.	Phra Nakhon Si Ayutthaya
Nong Kuai	หนองกวย	2001	94.63	3	นก.		Phra Nakhon Si Ayutthaya
Nong Saeng	หนองแซง	2002	98.04	2	นซ.		Saraburi
Nong Sida	หนองสีดา	2004	103.34	3	นด.		Saraburi
Ban Pokpaek	บ้านป๊อกแป๊ก	2005	107.15	1	ปป.	Has PTT Oil Pumping Facility	Saraburi
Saraburi	สระบุรี	2007	113.26	1	ะร.	Has Thaipicon concrete sleeper factory	Saraburi
Nong Bua	หนองบัว	2009	119.24	3	นบ.		Saraburi
Kaeng Khoi Junction	ชุมทางแก่งคอย	2011	125.10	1	กค.	Interchange with Kaeng Khoi - Bua Yai branch line. Main Depot with refueling facility. Beginning of dual-track railway due to mountain terrain.	Saraburi
Map Kabao	มาบกะเบา	2082	134.30	2	มบ.	Near SCCC concrete factory	Saraburi
Pha Sadet	ผาเสด็จ	2083	138.95	2	ผด.		Saraburi
Hin Lap	หินลับ	2084	144.29	2	หล.	Has TPI concrete factory	Saraburi
Muak Lek	มวกเหล็ก	2086	152.30	1	มล.		Saraburi
Klang Dong	กลางดง	2088	160.03	2	าง.		Nakhon Ratchasima
Pang Asok	ปางอโศก	2089	165.19	2	โศ.		Nakhon Ratchasima
Bandai Ma	บันไดม้า	2091	173.64	2	ได.		Nakhon Ratchasima
Pak Chong	ปากช่อง	2093	179.93	1	ปช.	End of dual-track railway.	Nakhon Ratchasima
Sap Muang	ซับม่วง	2095	187.89	3	ซม.		Nakhon Ratchasima
Chanthuk	จันทึก	2096	195.50	3	จท.		Nakhon Ratchasima
Khlong Khanan Chit	คลองขนานจิตร	2097	202.20	3	ขจ.		Nakhon Ratchasima
Khlong Phai	คลองไผ่	2100	206.21	3	คผ.		Nakhon Ratchasima
Lat Bua Khao	ลาดบัวขาว	2101	209.41	3	ลข.		Nakhon Ratchasima
Ban Mai Samrong	บ้านใหม่สำโรง	2102	214.90	3	สำ.		Nakhon Ratchasima
Nong Nam Khun	หนองน้ำขุ่น	2103	218.27	3	นข.		Nakhon Ratchasima
Sikhiu	สีคิ้ว	2105	223.79	2	สค.		Nakhon Ratchasima
Khok Sa-at	โคกสะอาด	2106	228.99	Halt	อา.		Nakhon Ratchasima
Sung Noen	สูงเนิน	2107	233.87	2	สน.		Nakhon Ratchasima
Kut Chik	กุดจิก	2109	241.15	3	กจ.		Nakhon Ratchasima
Khok Kruat	โคกกรวด	2111	249.94	3	คก.		Nakhon Ratchasima
Phu Khao Lat	ภูเขาลาด	2113	257.44	3	ขล.		Nakhon Ratchasima
Nakhon Ratchasima	นครราชสีมา	2114	263.65	1	รส.	Has railway to the second army support command	Nakhon Ratchasima
Thanon Chira Junction	ชุมทางถนนจิระ	2115	266.28	1	จร.	Branch into Ubon Ratchathani & Nong Khai lines	Nakhon Ratchasima
Thanon Chira Junction - Ubon Ratchathani
Thanon Chira Junction	ชุมทางถนนจิระ	2115	266.28	1	จร.	Interchange with Nong Khai Main Line	Nakhon Ratchasima
Ban Phanao	บ้านพะเนา	2211	276.35	3	พเ.		Nakhon Ratchasima
Ban Phra Phut	บ้านพระพุทธ	2212	280.10	Halt	าท.		Nakhon Ratchasima
Tha Chang	ท่าช้าง	2213	285.40	3	ชา.		Nakhon Ratchasima
Nong Manorom	หนองมโนรมย์	2215	293.26	3	มโ.		Nakhon Ratchasima
Chakkarat	จักราช	2217	300.15	2	จช.		Nakhon Ratchasima
Ban Hin Khon	บ้านหินโคน	2220	309.75	3	หโ.		Nakhon Ratchasima
Hin Dat	หินดาษ	2222	316.90	3	ดา.		Nakhon Ratchasima
Huai Thalaeng	ห้วยแถลง	2224	335.65	2	ถล.		Nakhon Ratchasima
Nong Krathing	หนองกระทิง	2227	337.50	3	ทง.		Buri Ram
Lam Plai Mat	ลำปลายมาศ	2229	345.70	1	ลำ.		Buri Ram
Thamen Chai	ทะเมนชัย	2231	354.85	3	มช.		Buri Ram
Ban Salaeng Phan	บ้านแสลงพัน	2233	363.30	3	งพ.		Buri Ram
Ban Nong Tat	บ้านหนองตาด	2234	366.50	3	ตา.		Buri Ram
Buriram	บุรีรัมย์	2236	376.02	1	รย.	Buriram provincial station. Branch line to a quarry at Khao Kradong.	Buri Ram
Ban Tako	บ้านตะโก	2237	380.35	Halt	ตโ.		Buri Ram
Huai Rat	ห้วยราช	2239	385.51	2	หร.		Buri Ram
Krasang	กระสัง	2243	398.65	2	ะส.		Buri Ram
Nong Teng	หนองเต็ง	2244	405.50	3	เต.		Buri Ram
Lam Chi	ลำชี	2246	412.00	3	ลช.		Surin
Surin	สุรินทร์	2248	419.75	1	สร.	Main Surin provincial station.	Surin
Bu Rusi	บุฤๅษี	2250	428.60	3	บ ุ.		Surin
Mueang Thi	เมืองที	2252	437.16	3	อท.		Surin
Kadon Kho	กะโดนค้อ	2254	445.50	3	ดค.		Surin
Sikhoraphum	ศีขรภูมิ	2256	452.39	1	รภ.		Surin
Ban Kalan	บ้านกะลัน	2258	460.25	3	ลน.		Surin
Samrong Thap	สำโรงทาบ	2261	471.00	2	สบ.		Surin
Huai Thap Than	ห้วยทับทัน	2264	481.50	2	ทท.		Sisaket
Nong Khaen	หนองแคน	2266	489.04	Halt	หค.		Sisaket
Uthumphon Phisai	อุทุมพรพิสัย	2267	494.45	1	อ ุ.		Sisaket
Ban Tae	บ้านแต้	2268	498.27	Halt	แต.		Sisaket
Ban Niam	บ้านเนียม	2270	504.00	3	นเ.		Sisaket
Si Sa Ket	ศรีสะเกษ	2273	515.09	1	เก.	Main Sisaket provincial station.	Sisaket
Chalerm Kanchana	เฉลิมกาญจนา	2275	522.28	Halt	ฉก.	Near the Chaloem Kanchana University.	Sisaket
Nong Waeng	หนองแวง	2277	527.19	3	อว.		Sisaket
Ban Khlo	บ้านคล้อ	2279	534.20	3	าค.		Sisaket
Kanthararom	กันทรารมย์	2281	542.18	2	าร.		Sisaket
Ban Non Phueng	บ้านโนนผึ้ง	2283	546.86	Halt	นผ.		Sisaket
Huai Khayung	ห้วยขยุง	2285	553.99	3	ขย.		Ubon Ratchathani
Ban Thon	บ้านถ่อน	2286	557.70	Halt	บถ.		Ubon Ratchathani
Bung Wai	บุ่งหวาย	2288	566.20	3	งห.	Branch railway to Ban Pho Mun station has been closed since December 1954.	Ubon Ratchathani
Ubon Ratchathani	อุบลราชธานี	2290	575.10	1	อน.		Ubon Ratchathani
Thanon Chira Junction - Nong Khai							Ubon Ratchathani
Thanon Chira Junction	ชุมทางถนนจิระ	2115	266.28	1	จร.	Interchange with Ubon Ratchathani Main Line	Nakhon Ratchasima
Ban Ko	บ้านเกาะ	2117	272.50	3	กะ.		Nakhon Ratchasima
Ban Kradon	บ้านกระโดน	2120	284.67	3	กโ.		Nakhon Ratchasima
Ban Nong Kan Nga	บ้านหนองกันงา	2291	288.12	Halt	ก้.		Nakhon Ratchasima
Nong Maeo	หนองแมว	2121	289.79	3	นง.		Nakhon Ratchasima
Non Sung	โนนสูง	2122	295.08	1	นโ.		Nakhon Ratchasima
Ban Dong Phlong	บ้านดงพลอง	2124	302.19	3			Nakhon Ratchasima
Ban Makha	บ้านมะค่า	2126	308.20	3	มค.		Nakhon Ratchasima
Noen Thua Paep	เนินถั่วแปบ	2127	311.38	Halt	ถป.		Nakhon Ratchasima
Phon Songkhram	พลสงคราม	2128	315.65	3	พค.		Nakhon Ratchasima
Ban Don Yai	บ้านดอนใหญ่	2129	320.35	3	ดญ.		Nakhon Ratchasima
Mueang Khong	เมืองคง	2131	326.80	1	งค.		Nakhon Ratchasima
Ban Rai	บ้านไร่	2132	333.67	Halt	นไ.		Nakhon Ratchasima
Non Thong Lang	โนนทองหลาง	2133	335.71	3	นท.		Nakhon Ratchasima
Huai Rahat	ห้วยระหัด	2135	342.50	Halt	ยร.		Nakhon Ratchasima
Bua Yai Junction	ชุมทางบัวใหญ่	2136	345.50	1	วญ.	Refuelling station; interchange with Kaeng Koi - Bua Yai branch line	Nakhon Ratchasima
Noen Sawat	เนินสวัสดิ์	2137	351.20	Halt	เว.		Nakhon Ratchasima
Nong Bua Lai	หนองบัวลาย	2139	357.36	3	งบ.		Nakhon Ratchasima
Sala Din	ศาลาดิน	2140	362.43	Halt	ดิ.		Nakhon Ratchasima
Nong Makhuea	หนองมะเขือ	2142	370.04	3	งอ.		Khon Kaen
Mueang Phon	เมืองพล	2144	377.66	1	อล.		Khon Kaen
Ban Han	บ้านหัน	2149	396.82	2	าห.	Only station serving Nonsila District	Khon Kaen
Ban Phai	บ้านไผ่	2152	407.72	1	บผ.		Khon Kaen
Ban Haet	บ้านแฮด	2156	423.60	3	ฮด.		Khon Kaen
Tha Phra	ท่าพระ	2160	439.81	3	พะ.		Khon Kaen
Khon Kaen	ขอนแก่น	2163	449.75	1	ขอ.		Khon Kaen
Samran	สำราญ	2166	460.71	2	าญ.		Khon Kaen
Non Phayom	โนนพยอม	2170	474.93	3	พอ.	Container unloading facilities available	Khon Kaen
Ban Wang Chai	บ้านวังชัย	2171	480.45	Halt	วช.		Khon Kaen
Nam Phong	น้ำพอง	2172	484.21	2	อง.		Khon Kaen
Huai Sieo	ห้วยเสียว	2174	489.95	3	ยว.		Khon Kaen
Khao Suan Kwang	เขาสวนกวาง	2177	500.51	3	สง.		Khon Kaen
Non Sa-at	โนนสะอาด	2181	514.45	3	โอ.		Udon Thani
Huai Koeng	ห้วยเกิ้ง	2183	523.40	3	ยก.		Udon Thani
Kumphawapi	กุมภวาปี	2186	532.50	1	วป.		Udon Thani
Huai Sam Phat	ห้วยสามพาด	2188	542.75	3	หพ.		Udon Thani
Nong Takai	หนองตะไก้	2190	550.65	3	งต.		Udon Thani
Kham Kling	คำกลิ้ง	2193	562.05	Halt	ลค.		Udon Thani
Nong Khon Kwang	หนองขอนกว้าง	2194	565.40	3	ออ.	TPI cement dispensing center.	Udon Thani
Udon Thani	อุดรธานี	2195	568.84	1	รด.		Udon Thani
Na Phu	นาพู่	2200	593.00	3	พ ู.		Udon Thani
Na Tha	นาทา	2207	617.84	3	ยน.	Nong Khai railway station near until July 1958.	Nong Khai
Nong Khai	หนองคาย	2208	621.10	1	นค.	Final station before border crossing. Nong Khai Mai railway station until May 2000.	Nong Khai
Talat Nong Khai	ตลาดหนองคาย	2209	623.58	Closed	ตง.	Nong Khai railway station near Mekong until May 2000 and closed in 2008.	Nong Khai
Thai-Laos border via First Thai–Lao Friendship Bridge
Thanaleng	ท่านาแล้ง	7201	626.58	1	ลล.	Shuttle train from Nong Khai until July 2024.	Vientiane Prefecture
Vientiane Logistics Park	เขตโลจิสติกนครหลวงเวียงจันทน์		627.26	Freight Terminal			Vientiane Prefecture
Vientiane (Khamsavath)	เวียงจันทน์ (คำสะหวาด)	7203	635.06	1	วจ.	Opened in July 2024.	Vientiane Prefecture
Kaeng Khoi - Bua Yai branch line
Kaeng Khoi Junction	ชุมทางแก่งคอย	2011	125.10	1	กค.	Interchange with Northeastern Main Line.	Saraburi
Ban Chong Tai	บ้านช่องใต้	2012	128.80	3	ชต.		Saraburi
Khao Khok	เขาคอก	2013	134.37	Halt	ขก.		Saraburi
Khao Hin Dat	เขาหินดาด	2015	141.85	Halt	ดด.		Saraburi
Hin Son	หินซ้อน	2017	147.90	3	หซ.		Saraburi
Khao Sung	เขาสูง	2018	152.30	Halt	ขส.		Saraburi
Kaeng Suea Ten	แก่งเสือเต้น	2020	159.65	3	แส.		Lop Buri
Pa Sak Jolasid Dam	เขื่อนป่าสักชลสิทธิ์	2301	162.38	Halt	ขธ.	Served by 75/76 trains on Saturdays. Excursion to Pa Sak Jolasid Dam runs between November and January.	Lop Buri
Ban Nong Bua	บ้านหนองบัว	2022	165.96	Halt	าบ.		Lop Buri
Khok Salung	โคกสลุง	2024	176.55	2	คุ.		Lop Buri
Suranarai	สุรนารายณ์	2026	185.80	3	ะน.		Lop Buri
Assumption Convent School	โรงเรียนอัสสัมชัญคอนแวนต์	2028	203.65	Halt			Lop Buri
Khao Yai Ka Ta	เขายายกะตา	2030	198.95	Halt	เย.	Former station.	Lop Buri
Talat Nam Narai	ตลาดลำนารายณ์	2032	207.38	Halt	รน.		Lop Buri
Lam Narai	ลำนารายณ์	2033	208.80	3	ลา.	Main Chai Badan District station.	Lop Buri
Ban Ko Rang	บ้านเกาะรัง	2036	220.35	Halt	รง.		Lop Buri
Phaendin Thong	แผ่นดินทอง	2038	226.45	3	แง.		Lop Buri
Ban Chongko	บ้านจงโก	2040	236.65	Halt	จโ.		Lop Buri
Khok Khli	โคกคลี	2042	240.87	3	คี.		Lop Buri
Khao Phang Hoei Tunnel at km 248.80 - 249.03
Chong Samran	ช่องสำราญ	2045	250.64	3	อช.		Chaiyaphum
Ban Wa Tabaek (Thep Sathit)	บ้านวะตะแบก (เทพสถิต)	2049	263.14	2	แบ.		Chaiyaphum
Huai Yai Chiu	ห้วยยายจิ๋ว	2052	273.13	3	จย.		Chaiyaphum
Ban Pak Chap	บ้านปากจาบ	2054	279.97	Halt	จบ.	Former station.	Chaiyaphum
Bamnet Narong	บำเหน็จณรงค์	2057	290.53	2	าจ.		Chaiyaphum
Ban Kloi	บ้านกลอย	2058	293.25	Halt	ย้.		Chaiyaphum
Wang Ka-am	วังกะอาม	2059	297.30	Halt	วอ.		Chaiyaphum
Non Khro	โนนคร้อ	2060	302.10	Halt	น้.	Former station.	Chaiyaphum
Chatturat	จัตุรัส	2062	310.19	1	จต.	Provincial station for Chaiyaphum Province. Located about 40 km from Chaiyaphum city center.	Chaiyaphum
Nong Chim	หนองฉิม	2066	322.85	3	ฉม.		Chaiyaphum
Ban Ta Noen	บ้านตาเนิน	2068	330.15	Halt	บต.		Chaiyaphum
Ban Nong Kham	บ้านหนองขาม	2069	334.05	Halt	บ้.		Chaiyaphum
Ban Lueam	บ้านเหลื่อม	2072	341.18	2	นเ.		Nakhon Ratchasima
Ban Khok Krabuang	บ้านโคกกระเบื้อง	2073	346.16	Halt	ะอ.		Nakhon Ratchasima
Ban Nong Pru Pong	บ้านหนองปรือโป่ง	2075	351.83	Halt	นป.		Nakhon Ratchasima
Nong Phluang	หนองพลวง	2076	355.19	3	งว.		Nakhon Ratchasima
Ban Kraphi	บ้านกระพี้	2303	358.20	Halt	พี.		Nakhon Ratchasima
Ban Kao Ngiu	บ้านเก่างิ้ว	2077	360.17	Halt	งิ.		Nakhon Ratchasima
Ban Sa Khrok	บ้านสระครก	2078	362.14	Halt	ะค.		Nakhon Ratchasima
Ban Sok Rang	บ้านโสกรัง	2079	366.50	Halt	บั.		Nakhon Ratchasima
Bua Yai Junction	ชุมทางบัวใหญ่	2136	375.90	1	วญ.	Refuelling station; interchange with Nong Khai Main Line.	Nakhon Ratchasima

== See also ==
- Northeastern Line (Thailand)
- Rail transport in Thailand
