= Khlong Khanan Chit railway station =

Railway station in Thailand

Coordinates: 14°50′33.41″N 100°32′38.25″E

Khlong Khanan Chit คลองขนานจิตร

General information
- Location: Khlong Phai Subdistrict, Sikhio District; Nakhon Ratchasima Province; Thailand
- Operator: State Railway of Thailand (SRT)
- Manager: Ministry of Transport
- Line: Ubon Ratchathani Main Line
- Platforms: 2
- Tracks: 2 (current)

Construction
- Structure type: At-grade

Other information
- Status: Under renovation
- Station code: ขจ.
- Classification: Class 3

History
- Rebuilt: 10 May 1953

Services
Preceding station	State Railway of Thailand	Following station
Chanthuk towards Hua Lamphong or Krung Thep Aphiwat	Northeastern Line	Khlong Phai towards Ubon Ratchathani or Khamsavath (Laos)
Location

Khlong Khanan Chit railway station (Thai: สถานีรถไฟคลองขนานจิตร) is a railway station on northeastern railway line, located in Khlong Phai Subdistrict, Sikhio District, Nakhon Ratchasima Province, Isan (northeastern Thailand). It is a class 3 railway station located 202.20 km (125.6 mi) from Hua Lamphong (Bangkok railway station).

== History ==
It was upgraded from railway halt to railway station on May 10, 1953. Originally, the building of the station was located in the current location of Lam Ta Khong Dam. Later on, when the dam was built, therefore moved the station to the current location. The station is opposite to Lam Ta Khong Dam and Highway 2 (Mittraphap Road), and located by the reservoir. Make it have a beautiful view like being by the sea. The station is currently being rebuilt as part of the double tracking project between Map Kabao and Thanon Chira Junction.

At approximately 11:30 p.m. on August 24, 2024, a tunnel collapse occurred during construction of the high-speed railway near the station. Three workers — two Chinese and a Myanmar national — were trapped inside. After five days, they were retrieved and found dead, having previously been thought to be alive.

== Train services ==
- Local train No. 431/432 Kaeng Khoi–Khon Kaen–Kaeng Khoi
- Ordinary train No. 233/234 Bangkok–Surin–Bangkok
