= Lam Narai railway station =

Railway station in Lopburi, Thailand

Coordinates: 15.2106°N 101.1308°E

Lam Narai ลำนารายณ์
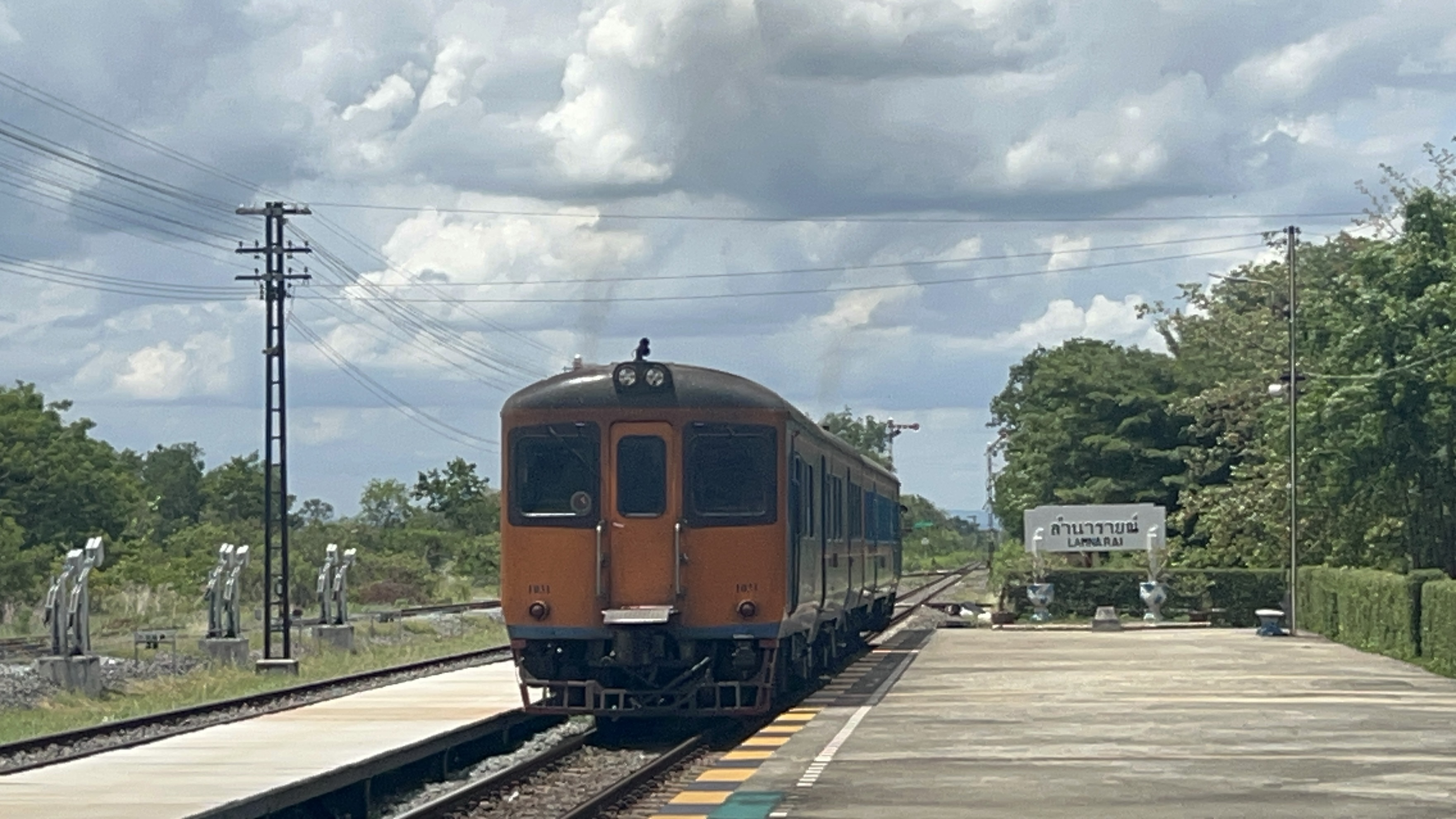
- SRT 1967 RHN departing Lam Narai operating Train Number 439

General information
- Location: Lam Narai Subdistrict, Chai Badan District; Lopburi Province; Thailand
- Operator: State Railway of Thailand
- Manager: Ministry of Transport
- Line: Lam Narai Branch
- Distance: 208.8 km
- Platforms: 1
- Tracks: 3

Construction
- Structure type: At-grade
- Parking: Yes

Other information
- Station code: 2033 (ลา.)
- Classification: Class 3

History
- Opened: 11 October 1961

Services
Preceding station	State Railway of Thailand	Following station
Talat Lam Narai Halt towards Kaeng Khoi Junction	Northeastern Line Kaeng Khoi–Bua Yai Branch	Ban Ko Rang Halt towards Bua Yai Junction
Location

Lam Narai railway station (Thai: สถานีลำนารายณ์) is a railway station located in Lam Narai Subdistrict, Chai Badan District, Lopburi. It is a class 3 railway station located 208.8 km (129.7 mi) from Bangkok railway station.. It was a terminus station from 1961 to 1967, until the route to Bua Yai Junction was completed and opened on 19 August 1967

== Train services ==
=== Current ===
- Special Express (CNR) No. 25/26 Krung Thep Aphiwat Central Terminal–Nong Khai–Krung Thep Aphiwat Central Terminal
- Express No. 75/76 Krung Thep Aphiwat Central Terminal–Nong Khai–Krung Thep Aphiwat Central Terminal
- Rapid No. 133/134 Krung Thep Aphiwat Central Terminal–Vientiane (Khamsavath)–Krung Thep Aphiwat Central Terminal
- Local No. 433/434 Kaeng Khoi Junction–Bua Yai Junction–Kaeng Khoi Junction
- Local No. 439/440 Kaeng Khoi Junction–Bua Yai Junction–Kaeng Khoi Junction

=== Suspended ===
- Local No. 437/438 Kaeng Khoi Junction–Lam Narai–Kaeng Khoi Junction
