= Sung Noen railway station =

Thai railway station

Coordinates: 14.8998215°N 101.814744°E

Sung Noen สูงเนิน

General information
- Location: Highway 2161, Sung Noen Subdistrict, Sung Noen District, Nakhon Ratchasima Province, 30170
- Owner: State Railway of Thailand (SRT)
- Manager: Ministry of Transport
- Line: Ubon Ratchathani Main Line
- Distance: 233.87 km (145.3 mi) from Bangkok
- Platforms: 1
- Tracks: 3

Construction
- Structure type: At-grade
- Parking: Yes

Other information
- Station code: สน.

Services
Preceding station	State Railway of Thailand	Following station
Khok Sa-at towards Hua Lamphong or Krung Thep Aphiwat	Northeastern Line	Kut Chik towards Ubon Ratchathani or Khamsavath (Laos)
Location

Sung Noen railway station (Thai: สถานีรถไฟสูงเนิน) is a railway station located in Sung Noen Subdistrict, Sung Noen District, Nakhon Ratchasima Province. It is a class 2 railway station located 233.87 km (145.3 mi) from Bangkok railway station (Hua Lamphong railway station).

== History ==
The station is considered one of the two railway stations in Sung Noen District (the other one is the next station Kut Chik). It is more than 100 years old was built and opened since the King Rama V's reign.

In the era when Mittraphap Road (Highway 2) was not yet built (before 1959), around the station was a local morning market, which had two sides. When one side of the market was over, traders moved to opposite side. There were merchant and passenger carriages. The goods that the traders bring with them to sell are duck eggs, vegetables, betel nuts, all of them are good stuffs of Sung Noen. They started trading in the early morning around 4.00 am. or 5.00 am.

Sung Noen station was important in terms of being where trains stop for firewood and water. The old water tower is still visible today. Sung Noen railway station is a historic place, when the royal train of King Rama IX and Queen Sirikit used to stop. When the couple visited Nakhon Ratchasima for the first time on November 2, 1955. Sung Noen elderly woman and her son offered porcelain to the Queen.

The station building has 2 floors, the age is estimated to be more than 80 years old, the upper floor is the station master's accommodation. The building is made of wood and has decayed over time, but has been restored by keeping everything intact. It was moved from the original location for only 50 m (164.0 ft), despite the previous idea to demolish as a result of the construction of the double-track railway. Today, it has been restored to a local museum displaying photographs and stories showing the pride of the Sung Noen people.

In addition, another pride of locals is a small steam locomotive that has been dubbed "Sung Noen the Benevolent", because it is a small train ran to get firewood from the forest. The small train did its duty as firewood transporter and fed to large trains. This small steam locomotive is now preserved in a Train Museum, Bangkok.

== Train services ==
- Rapid No. 135/136 Bangkok-Ubon Ratchathani-Bangkok
- Ordinary No. 233/234 Bangkok-Surin-Bangkok
- Rapid No. 141/142 Bangkok-Ubon Ratchathani-Bangkok (not in service due to COVID-19 pandemic)
- Rapid No. 145/146 Bangkok-Ubon Ratchathani-Bangkok (not in service due to COVID-19 pandemic)
- Local No. 431/432 Kaeng Khoi Junction-Khon Kaen-Kaeng Khoi Junction
