= Phaendin Thong railway station =

Railway stationin Thailand

Phaendin Thong แผ่นดินทอง
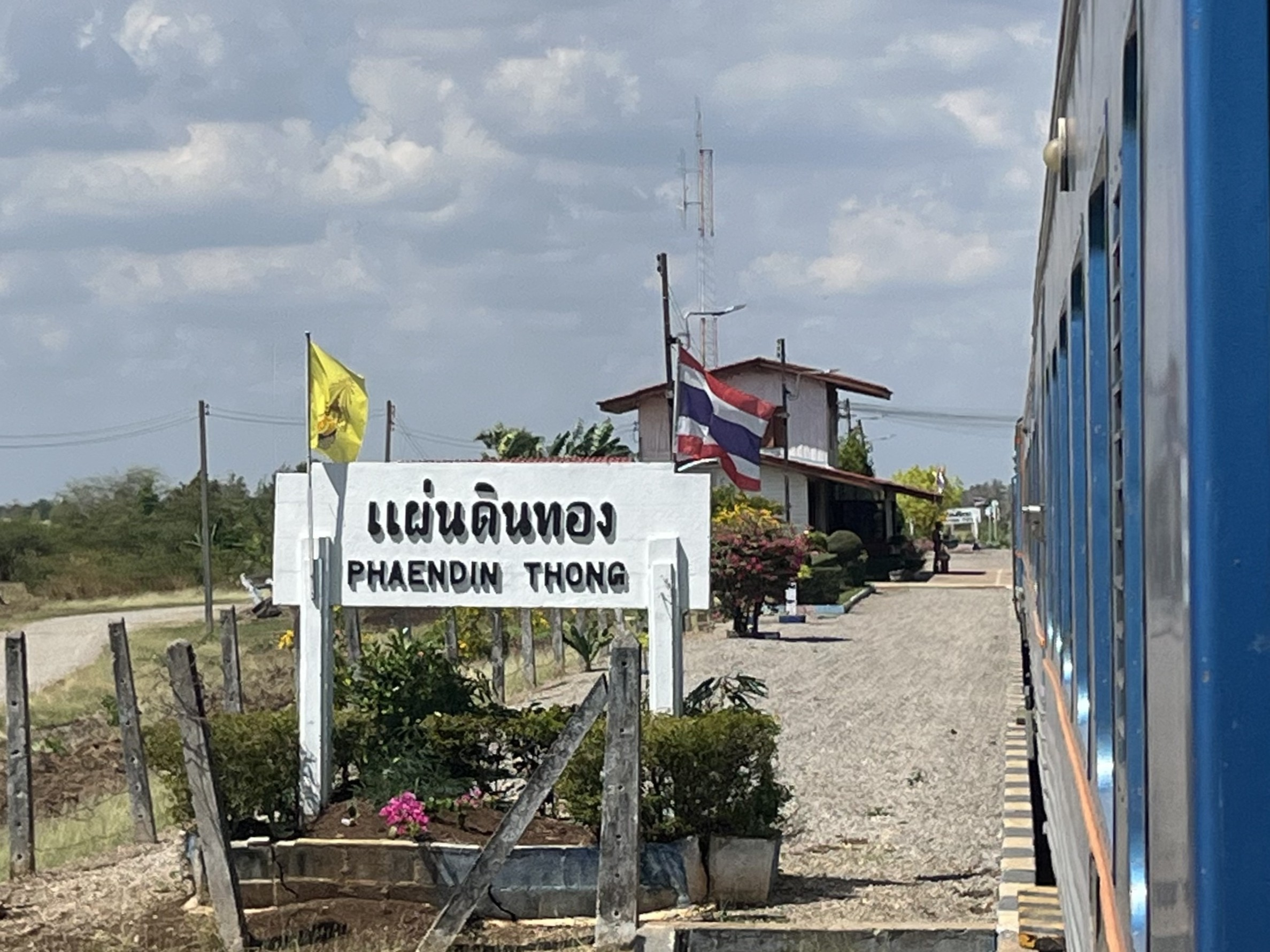
- Station in 2026

General information
- Location: Nong Yai To Subdistrict, Chai Badan District; Lopburi Province; Thailand
- Coordinates: 15.2503°N 101.2605°E
- Operator: State Railway of Thailand
- Line: Lam Narai Branch Line
- Platforms: 1
- Tracks: 2

Construction
- Structure type: At-grade

Other information
- Station code: แง.
- Classification: Class 3

Services
| Preceding station | State Railway of Thailand | Following station |
|---|---|---|
| Ban Ko Rang Halt towards Kaeng Khoi Junction | Northeastern Line Kaeng Khoi–Bua Yai Branch | Ban Chongko Halt towards Bua Yai Junction |
Location

Phaendin Thong railway station is a railway station located in Nong Yai To Subdistrict, Chai Badan District, Lopburi Province. It is a class 3 railway station located 226.45 km (140.7 mi) from Bangkok railway station.

== Gallery ==
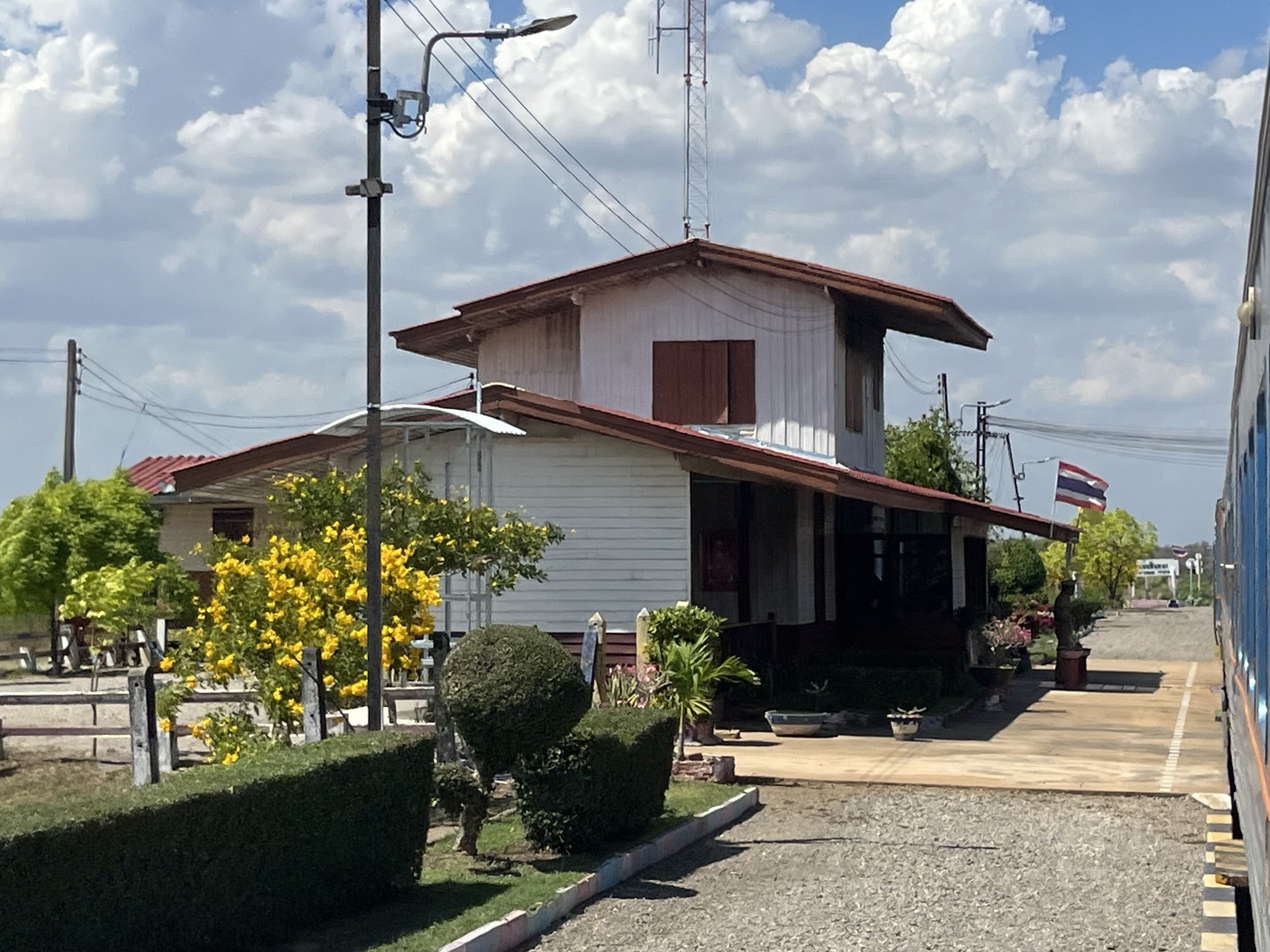
Station building
