= Nong Bua Lai railway station =

Railway station in Thailand

Nong Bua Lai หนองบัวลาย

General information
- Location: Bua Lai Subdistrict, Bua Lai District; Nakhon Ratchasima Province; Thailand
- Coordinates: 15°40′06″N 102°29′48″E
- Operator: State Railway of Thailand
- Line: Nong Khai Main Line
- Platforms: 2
- Tracks: 4

Construction
- Structure type: At-grade

Other information
- Station code: งบ.
- Classification: Class 3

History
- Rebuilt: 2019

Services
Preceding station	State Railway of Thailand	Following station
Noen Sawat Halt towards Hua Lamphong or Krung Thep Aphiwat	Northeastern Line	Sala Din Halt towards Khamsavath (Laos)
Location

Nong Bua Lai railway station is a railway station located in Bua Lai Subdistrict, Bua Lai District, Nakhon Ratchasima Province. It is a class 3 railway station located 357.36 km (222.1 mi) from Bangkok railway station and is the main station for Bua Lai District. The station was rebuilt in 2019 as part of the double tracking project between Thanon Chira Junction and Khon Kaen.
