= Kaeng Suea Ten railway station =

Railway station in Thailand

Kaeng Suea Ten แก่งเสือเต้น
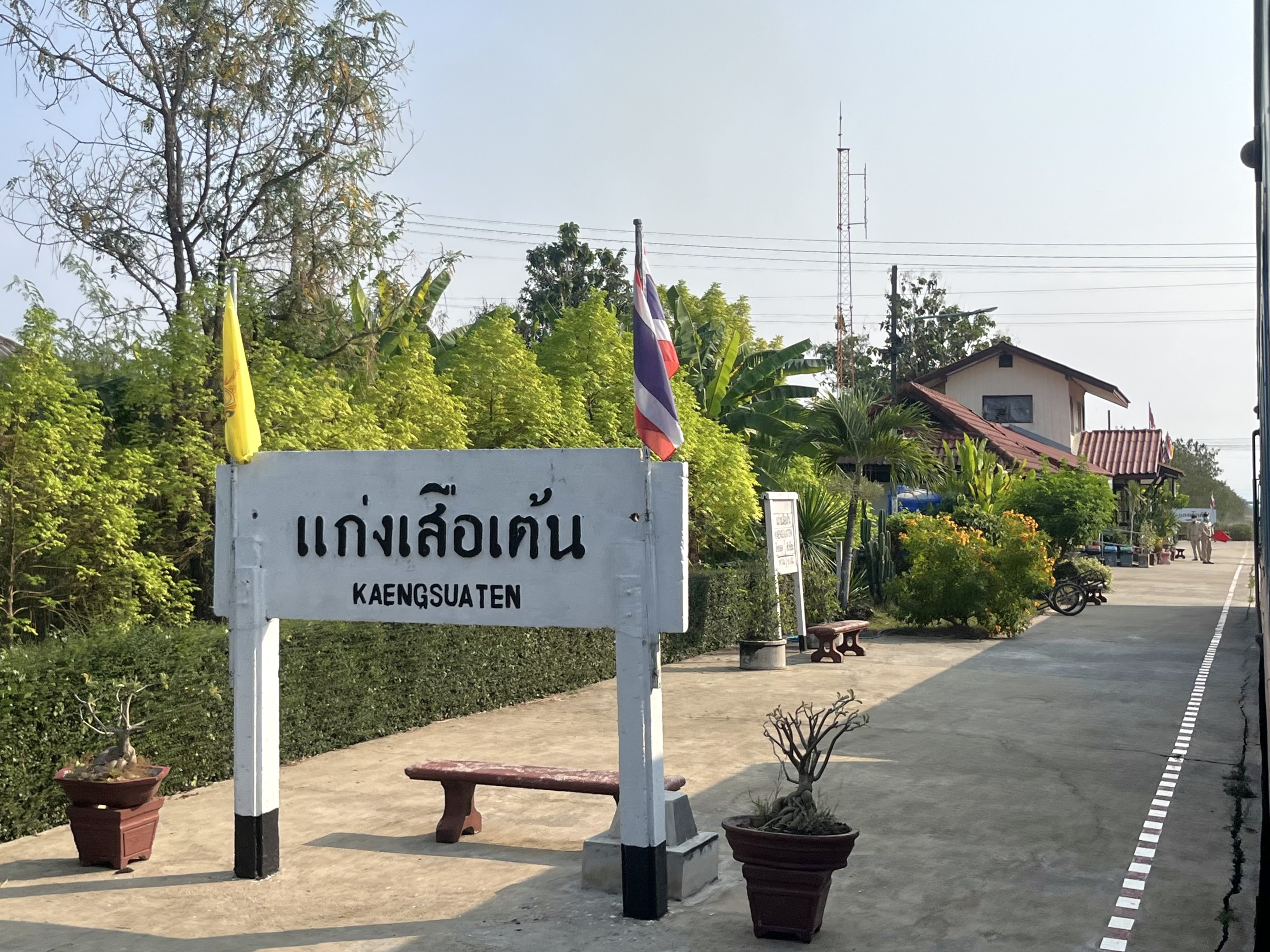
- Station in 2026

General information
- Location: Nong Bua Subdistrict, Phatthana Nikhom District; Lopburi Province; Thailand
- Coordinates: 14.8424°N 101.0638°E
- Operator: State Railway of Thailand
- Line: Lam Narai Branch
- Platforms: 1
- Tracks: 2

Construction
- Structure type: At-grade

Other information
- Station code: แส.

History
- Opened: 4 January 1956

Services
Preceding station	State Railway of Thailand	Following station
Khao Sung Halt towards Kaeng Khoi Junction	Northeastern Line Kaeng Khoi–Bua Yai Branch	Pa Sak Jolasid Dam Halt towards Bua Yai Junction
Location

Kaeng Suea Ten railway station is a railway station located in Nong Bua Subdistrict, Phatthana Nikhom District, Lopburi Province. It is a class 3 railway station located 159.65 km (99.2 mi) from Bangkok railway station and is the main station for Phatthana Nikhom District.

== Gallery ==
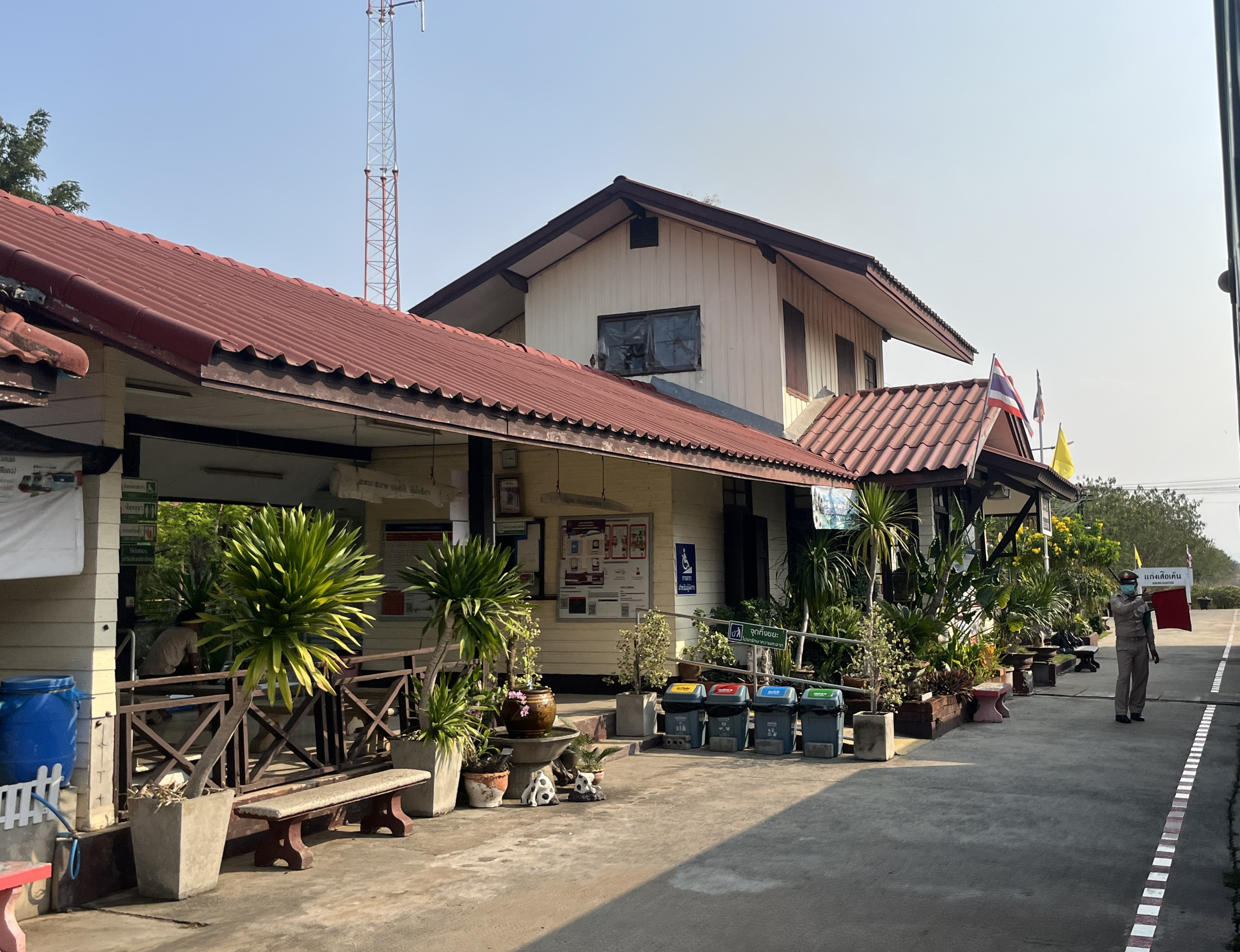
Station building
