= Ban Lueam railway station =

Railway station in Thailand

Ban Lueam บ้านเหลื่อม
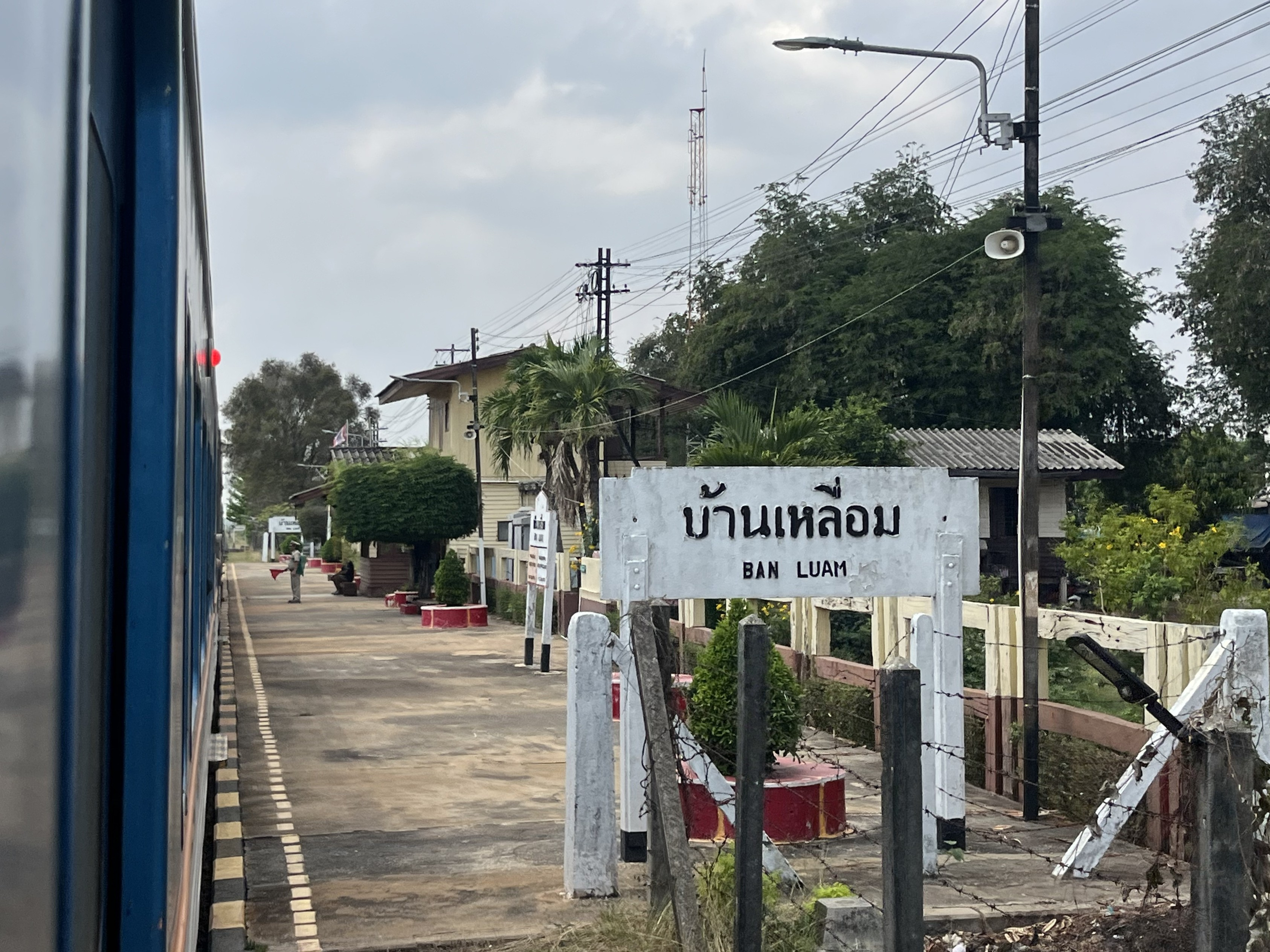
- Station in 2026

General information
- Location: Wang Pho Subdistrict, Ban Lueam District; Nakhon Ratchasima Province; Thailand
- Coordinates: 15°36′01″N 102°07′12″E
- Operator: State Railway of Thailand
- Line: Lam Narai Branch
- Platforms: 1
- Tracks: 2

Construction
- Structure type: At-grade

Other information
- Station code: นเ.
- Classification: Class 2

History
- Opened: 19 August 1967

Services
Preceding station	State Railway of Thailand	Following station
Ban Nong Kham Halt towards Kaeng Khoi Junction	Northeastern Line Kaeng Khoi–Bua Yai Branch	Ban Khok Krabuang Halt towards Bua Yai Junction
Location

Ban Lueam station (Thai: สถานีบ้านเหลื่อม) is a railway station located in Wang Pho Subdistrict, Ban Lueam District, Nakhon Ratchasima Province. It is a class 2 railway station located 341.18 km (212.0 mi) from Bangkok railway station and is the main station of Ban Lueam District.
