= Hin Son railway station =

Railway station in Thailand

Hin Son หินซ้อน
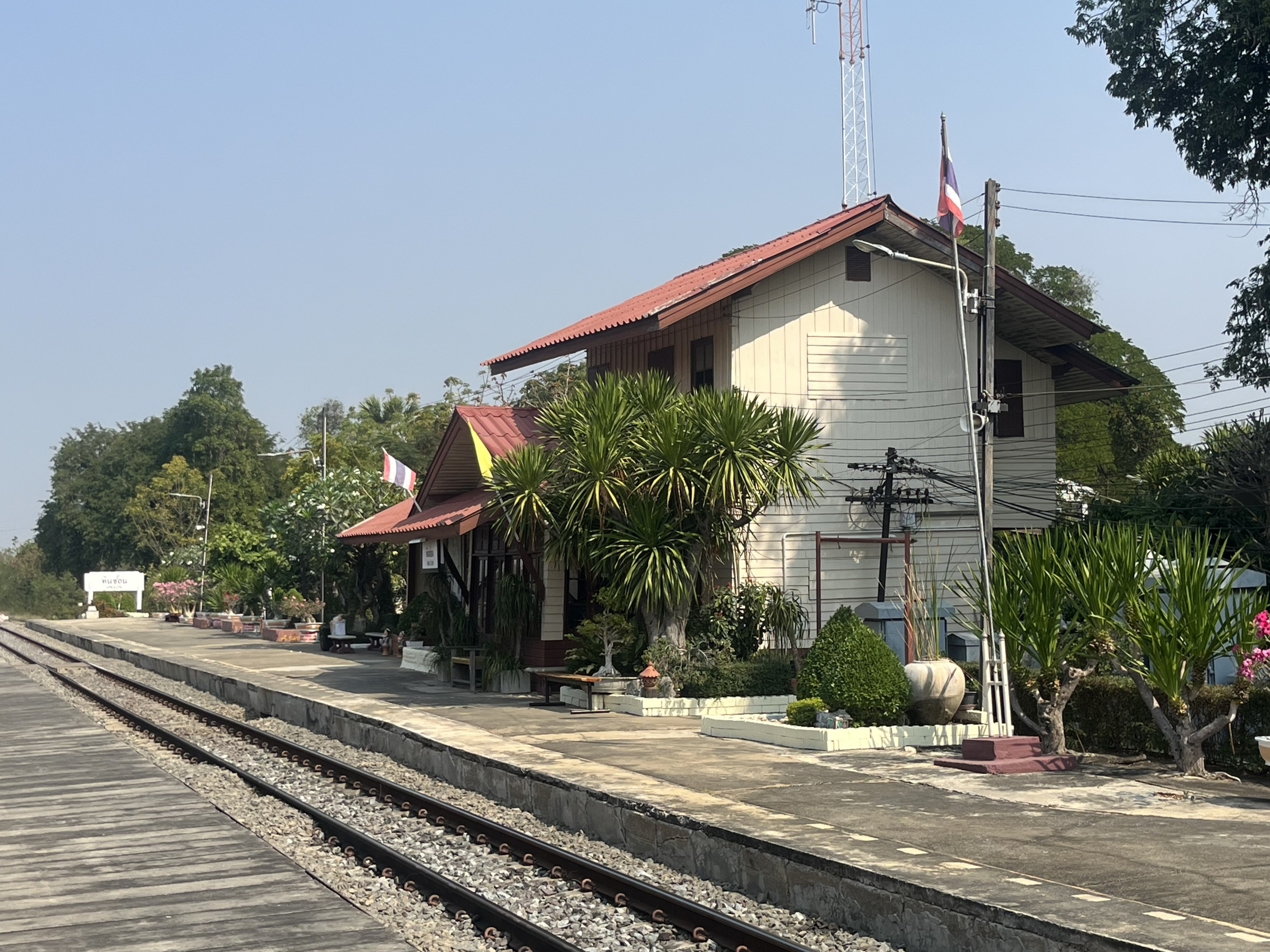
- Station in 2026

General information
- Location: Hin Son Subdistrict, Kaeng Khoi District; Saraburi Province; Thailand
- Coordinates: 14.7413°N 101.0511°E
- Operator: State Railway of Thailand
- Line: Lam Narai Branch Line
- Distance: 147.90 km (91.9 mi) from Bangkok
- Platforms: 1
- Tracks: 4

Other information
- Station code: หซ.
- Classification: Class 3

History
- Opened: 4 January 1956

Services
Preceding station	State Railway of Thailand	Following station
Khao Hin Dat Halt towards Kaeng Khoi Junction	Northeastern Line Kaeng Khoi–Bua Yai Branch	Khao Sung Halt towards Bua Yai Junction
Location

Hin Son railway station is a railway station located in Hin Son Subdistrict, Kaeng Khoi District, Saraburi Province. It is a class 3 railway station located 147.90 km (91.9 mi) from Bangkok railway station.
