= Bamnet Narong railway station =

Railway station in Thailand

Bamnet Narong บำเหน็จณรงค์
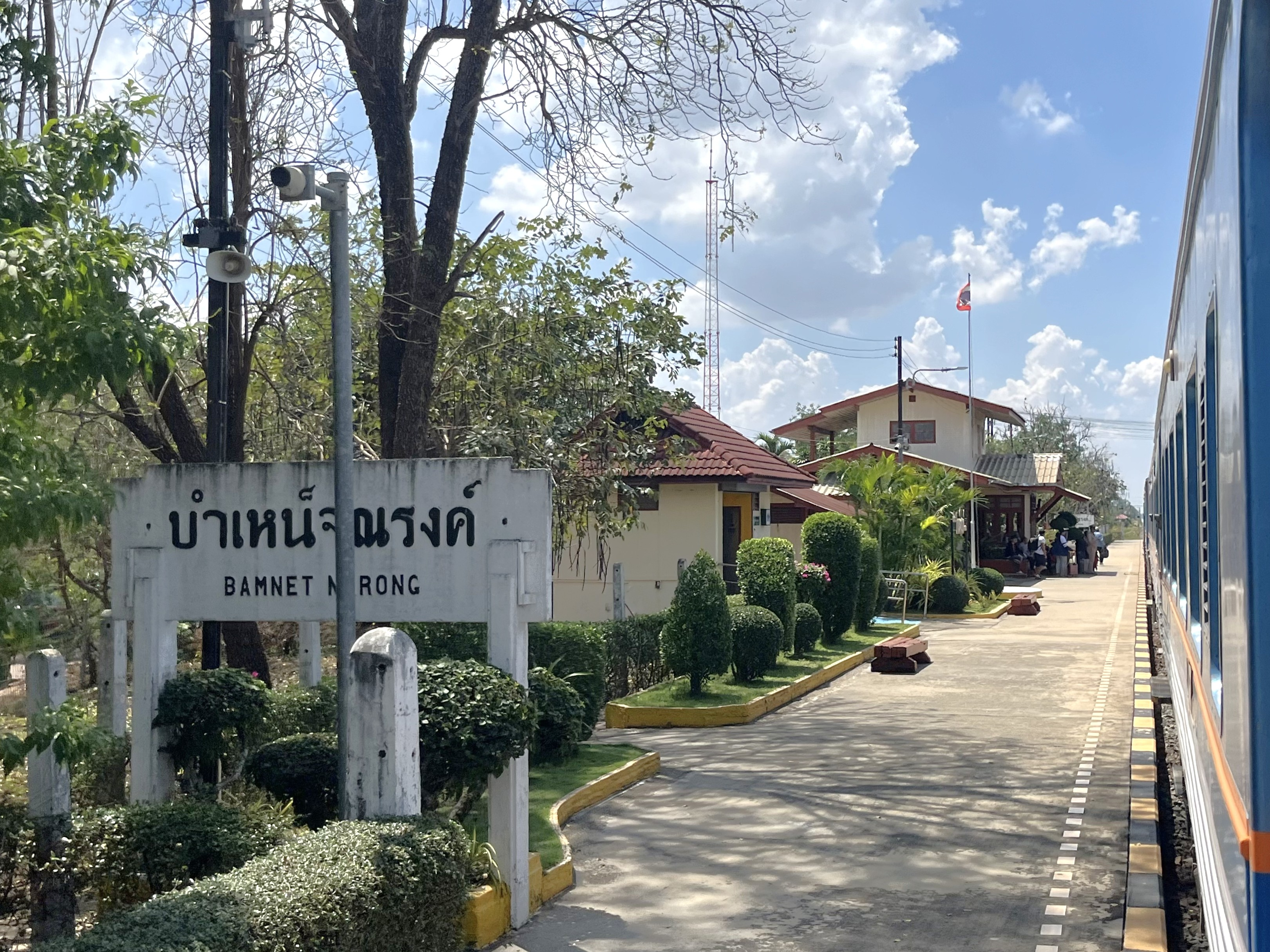
- Station in 2026

General information
- Location: Ban Phet Subdistrict, Bamnet Narong District; Chaiyaphum Province; Thailand
- Coordinates: 15°28′07″N 101°41′07″E
- Operator: State Railway of Thailand
- Line: Lam Narai Branch
- Platforms: 1
- Tracks: 5

Construction
- Structure type: At-grade

Other information
- Station code: าจ.
- Classification: Class 2

History
- Opened: 19 August 1967

Services
Preceding station	State Railway of Thailand	Following station
Ban Pak Chap Halt towards Kaeng Khoi Junction	Northeastern Line Kaeng Khoi–Bua Yai Branch	Ban Kloi Halt towards Bua Yai Junction
Location

Bamnet Narong station (Thai: สถานีบำเหน็จณรงค์) is a railway station located in Ban Phet Subdistrict, Bamnet Narong District, Chaiyaphum Province. It is a class 2 railway station located 290.53 km (180.5 mi) from Bangkok railway station and is the main station for Bamnet Narong District.

== Gallery ==
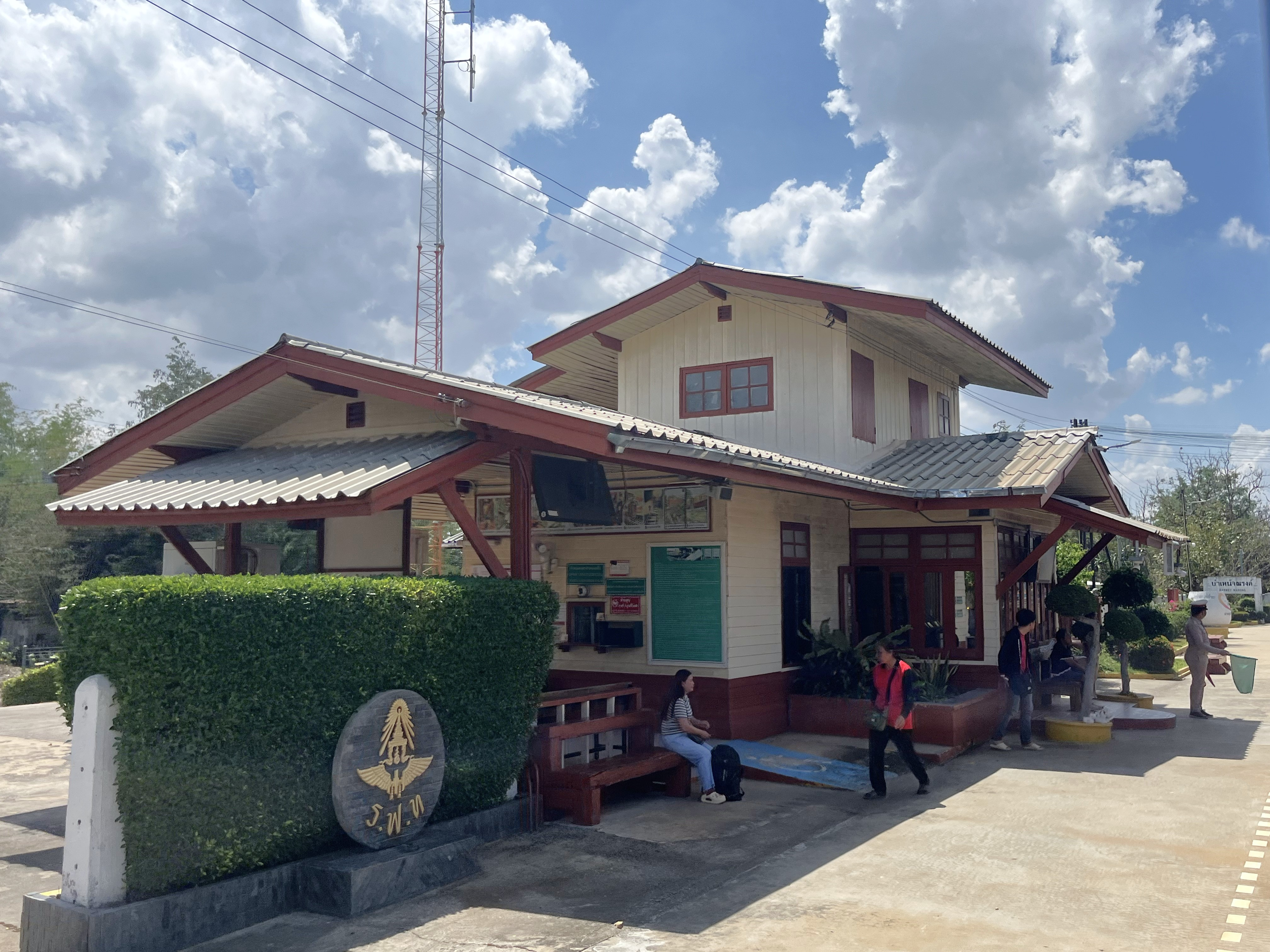
Station building
