= Nong Phluang railway station =

Railway station in Thailand

Nong Phluang หนองพลวง
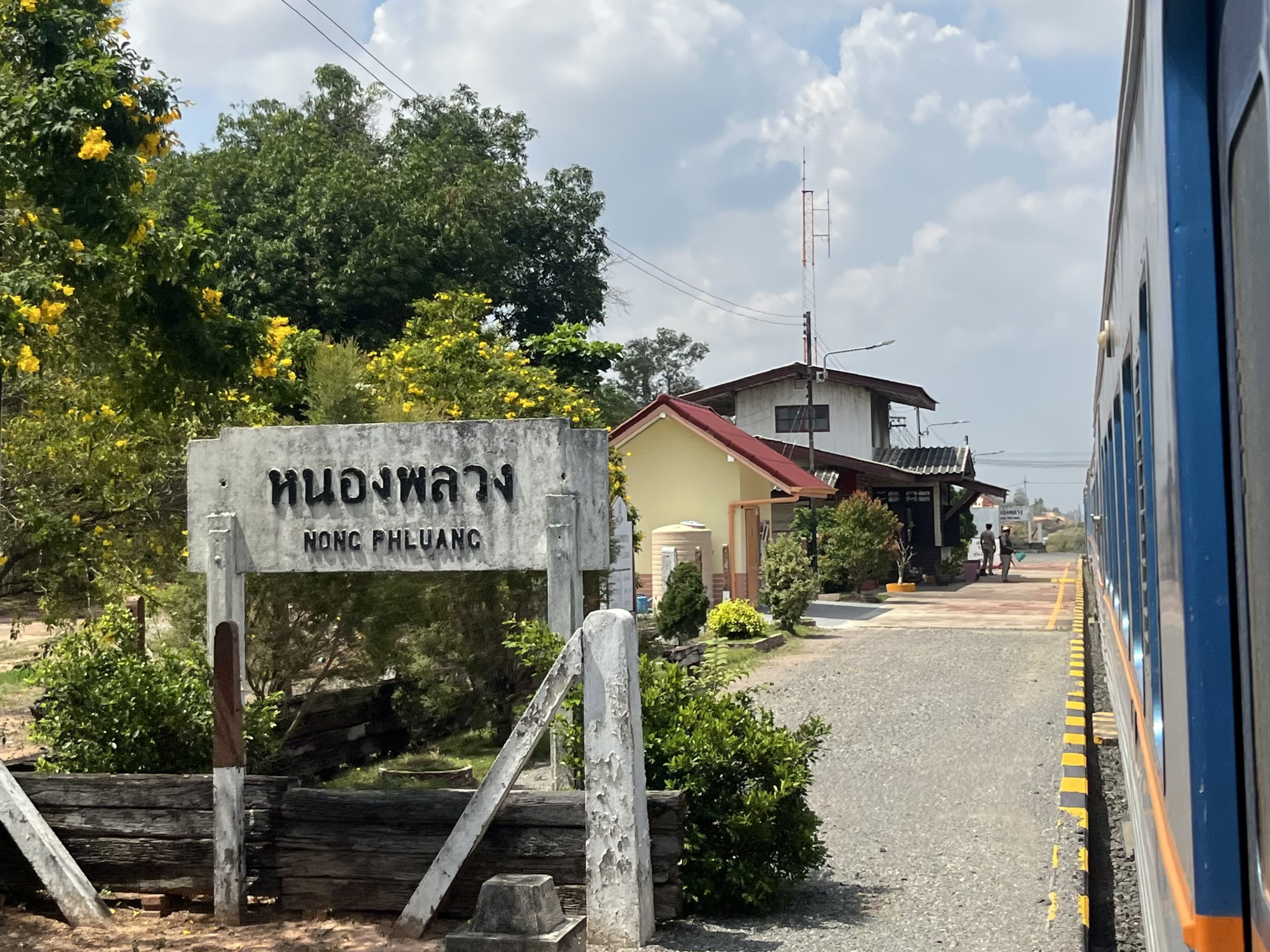
- Station in 2026

General information
- Location: Nong Bua Sa-at Subdistrict, Bua Yai District; Nakhon Ratchasima Province; Thailand
- Coordinates: 15°35′56″N 102°14′55″E
- Operator: State Railway of Thailand
- Line: Lam Narai Branch
- Platforms: 1
- Tracks: 5

Construction
- Structure type: At-grade

Other information
- Station code: งว.
- Classification: Class 3

Services
Preceding station	State Railway of Thailand	Following station
Ban Nong Prue Pong Halt towards Kaeng Khoi Junction	Northeastern Line Kaeng Khoi–Bua Yai Branch	Ban Kraphi Halt towards Bua Yai Junction
Location

Nong Phluang railway station is a railway station located in Nong Bua Sa-at Subdistrict, Bua Yai District, Nakhon Ratchasima Province. It is a class 3 railway station located 355.19 km (220.7 mi) from Bangkok railway station.

== Gallery ==
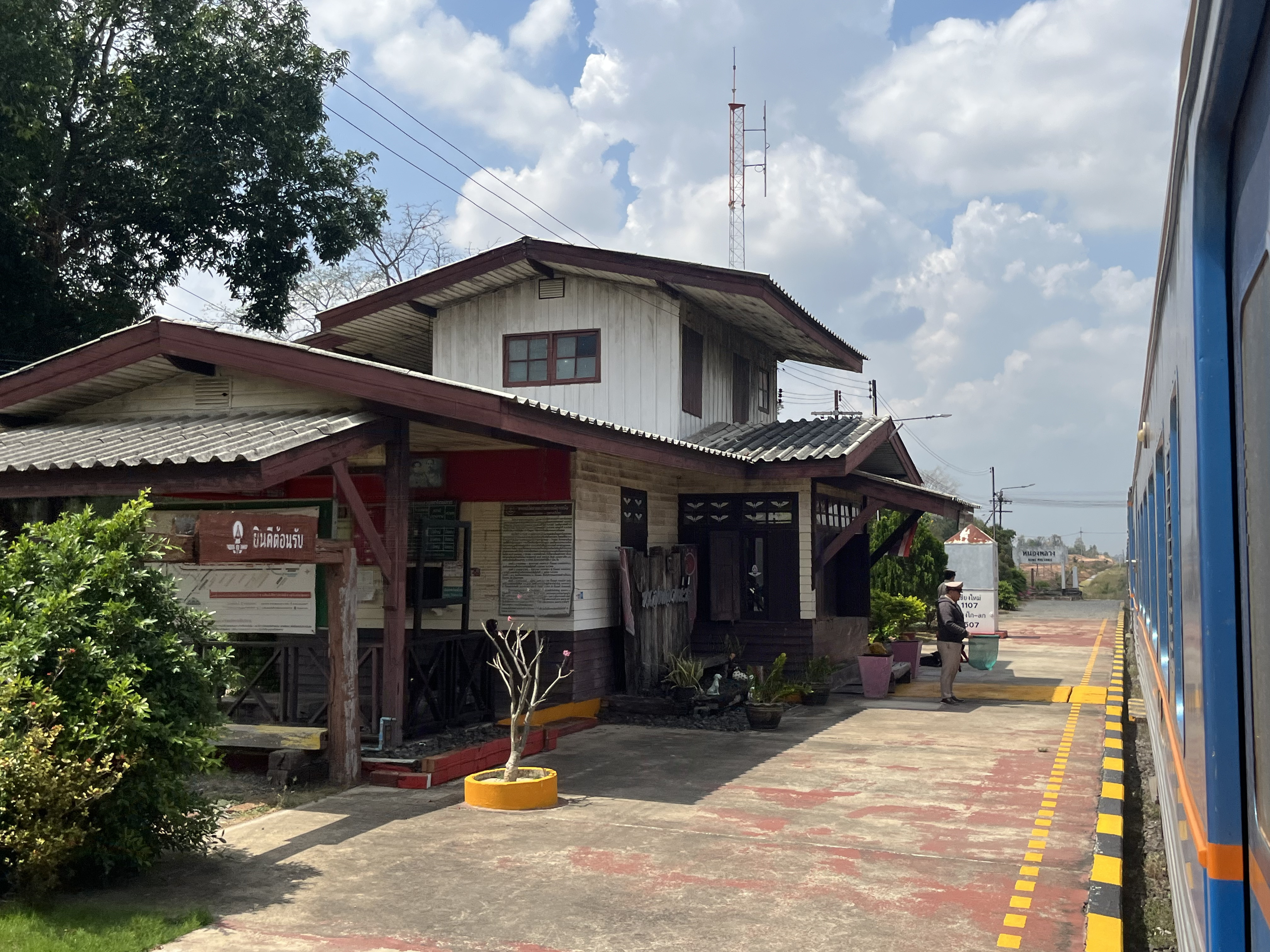
Station building
