= Uthumphon Phisai railway station =

Railway station in Thailand

Uthumphon Phisai อุทุมพรพิสัย

General information
- Location: Kamphaeng Subdistrict, Uthumphon Phisai District; Sisaket Province; Thailand
- Coordinates: 15°06′22″N 104°08′25″E
- Operator: State Railway of Thailand
- Manager: Ministry of Transport
- Line: Ubon Ratchathani Main Line
- Platforms: 2
- Tracks: 3

Construction
- Structure type: At-grade
- Parking: Yes
- Cycle facilities: Yes

Other information
- Station code: อุ.
- Classification: Class 1

Services
Preceding station	State Railway of Thailand	Following station
Nong Khaen Halt towards Hua Lamphong or Krung Thep Aphiwat	Northeastern Line	Ban Tae Halt towards Ubon Ratchathani
Location

Uthumphon Phisai railway station is a railway station located in Kamphaeng Subdistrict, Uthumphon Phisai District, Sisaket Province. It is a class 1 railway station located 494.45 km (307.2 mi) from Bangkok railway station and is the main railway station for Uthumphon Phisai District.
