= Huai Khayung railway station =

Railway station in Thailand

Huai Khayung ห้วยขยุง

General information
- Location: Huai Khayung Subdistrict, Warin Chamrap District; Ubon Ratchathani Province; Thailand
- Coordinates: 15°06′35″N 104°41′17″E
- Operator: State Railway of Thailand
- Manager: Ministry of Transport
- Line: Ubon Ratchathani Main Line
- Platforms: 1
- Tracks: 3

Construction
- Structure type: At-grade

Other information
- Station code: ขย.
- Classification: Class 3

Services
Preceding station	State Railway of Thailand	Following station
Ban Non Phueng Halt towards Hua Lamphong or Krung Thep Aphiwat	Northeastern Line	Ban Thon Halt towards Ubon Ratchathani
Location

Huai Khayung railway station is a railway station located in Huai Khayung Subdistrict, Warin Chamrap District, Ubon Ratchathani Province. It is a class 3 railway station located 553.99 km (344.2 mi) from Bangkok railway station. It is the location of a TPI Polene cement rail distribution center.
