= Ban Kradon railway station =

Railway station in Thailand

Ban Kradon บ้านกระโดน

General information
- Location: Nong Khai Nam Subdistrict, Mueang Nakhon Ratchasima District; Nakhon Ratchasima Province; Thailand
- Coordinates: 15°06′16″N 102°11′12″E
- Operator: State Railway of Thailand
- Line: Nong Khai Main Line
- Platforms: 2
- Tracks: 5

Construction
- Structure type: At-grade

Other information
- Station code: กโ.
- Classification: Class 3

History
- Rebuilt: 2019

Services
Preceding station	State Railway of Thailand	Following station
Ban Ko towards Hua Lamphong or Krung Thep Aphiwat	Northeastern Line	Ban Nong Kan Nga Halt towards Khamsavath (Laos)
Location

Ban Kradon station (Thai: สถานีบ้านกระโดน) is a railway station located in Nong Khai Nam Subdistrict, Mueang Nakhon Ratchasima District, Nakhon Ratchasima Province. It is a class 3 railway station located 284.67 km (176.9 mi) from Bangkok railway station. The station was originally a railway halt. It was upgraded to a railway station and rebuilt in 2019 as part of the double tracking project between Thanon Chira Junction and Khon Kaen.
