= Non Thong Lang railway station =

Railway station in Thailand

Non Thong Lang โนนทองหลาง

General information
- Location: Non Thong Lang Subdistrict, Bua Yai District; Nakhon Ratchasima Province; Thailand
- Coordinates: 15°30′46″N 102°22′34″E
- Operator: State Railway of Thailand
- Line: Nong Khai Main Line
- Platforms: 2
- Tracks: 2

Construction
- Structure type: At-grade

Other information
- Station code: นท.
- Classification: Class 3

History
- Rebuilt: 2019

Services
Preceding station	State Railway of Thailand	Following station
Ban Rai Halt towards Hua Lamphong or Krung Thep Aphiwat	Northeastern Line	Huai Rahat Halt towards Khamsavath (Laos)
Location

Non Thong Lang railway station is a railway station located in Non Thong Lang Subdistrict, Bua Yai District, Nakhon Ratchasima Province. It is a class 3 railway station located 335.71 km (208.6 mi) from Bangkok railway station. The station was rebuilt in 2019 as part of the double tracking project between Thanon Chira Junction and Khon Kaen.
