= Ban Phanao railway station =

Railway station in Thailand

Ban Phanao บ้านพะเนา

General information
- Location: Phanao Subdistrict, Mueang Nakhon Ratchasima District; Nakhon Ratchasima Province; Thailand
- Coordinates: 14°59′09″N 102°11′34″E
- Operator: State Railway of Thailand
- Line: Ubon Ratchathani Main Line
- Platforms: 1
- Tracks: 2

Construction
- Structure type: At-grade

Other information
- Station code: พเ.
- Classification: Class 3

Services
Preceding station	State Railway of Thailand	Following station
Thanon Chira Junction towards Hua Lamphong or Krung Thep Aphiwat	Northeastern Line	Ban Phra Phut Halt towards Ubon Ratchathani
Location

Ban Phanao station (Thai: สถานีบ้านพะเนา) is a railway station located in Phanao Subdistrict, Mueang Nakhon Ratchasima District, Nakhon Ratchasima Province. It is a class 3 railway station located 276.35 km (171.7 mi) from Bangkok railway station.
