= Bung Wai railway station =

Railway station in Thailand

Bung Wai บุ่งหวาย

General information
- Location: Bung Wai Subdistrict, Warin Chamrap District; Ubon Ratchathani Province; Thailand
- Coordinates: 15°09′22″N 104°47′22″E
- Operator: State Railway of Thailand
- Line: Ubon Ratchathani Main Line
- Platforms: 1
- Tracks: 2

Construction
- Structure type: At-grade

Other information
- Station code: งห.
- Classification: Class 3

Services
Preceding station	State Railway of Thailand	Following station
Ban Thon Halt towards Hua Lamphong or Krung Thep Aphiwat	Northeastern Line	Ubon Ratchathani Terminus
Location

Bung Wai railway station (Thai: สถานีรถไฟบุ่งหวาย) is a railway station located in Bung Wai Subdistrict, Warin Chamrap District, Ubon Ratchathani Province. It is a class 3 railway station located 566.20 km (351.8 mi) from Bangkok railway station. In the past, it acted as a junction to Ban Pho Mun railway station, but the line was closed in December 1954.
