= Ban Ko railway station =

Railway station in Thailand

Ban Ko บ้านเกาะ

General information
- Location: Ban Ko Subdistrict, Mueang Nakhon Ratchasima District; Nakhon Ratchasima Province; Thailand
- Coordinates: 15°00′15″N 102°08′18″E
- Operator: State Railway of Thailand
- Line: Nong Khai Main Line
- Platforms: 2
- Tracks: 2

Construction
- Structure type: At-grade

Other information
- Station code: กะ.
- Classification: Class 3

History
- Rebuilt: 2019

Services
Preceding station	State Railway of Thailand	Following station
Thanon Chira Junction towards Hua Lamphong or Krung Thep Aphiwat	Northeastern Line	Ban Kradon towards Khamsavath (Laos)
Location

Ban Ko station (Thai: สถานีบ้านเกาะ) is a railway station located in Ban Ko Subdistrict, Mueang Nakhon Ratchasima District, Nakhon Ratchasima Province. It is a class 3 railway station located 272.50 km (169.3 mi) from Bangkok railway station. It was rebuilt in 2019 as part of the double tracking project between Thanon Chira Junction and Khon Kaen.
