= Huai Thap Than railway station =

Railway station in Thailand

Huai Thap Than ห้วยทับทัน

General information
- Location: Huai Thap Than Subdistrict, Huai Thap Than District, Sisaket Province
- Coordinates: 15°03′32″N 104°01′48″E
- Owner: State Railway of Thailand
- Line: Northeastern Line
- Platforms: 1
- Tracks: 2

Other information
- Station code: ทท.

Services
Preceding station	State Railway of Thailand	Following station
Samrong Thap towards Hua Lamphong or Krung Thep Aphiwat	Northeastern Line	Nong Khaen Halt towards Ubon Ratchathani
Location

Huai Thap Than railway station is a railway station located in Huai Thap Than Subdistrict, Huai Thap Than District, Sisaket Province. It is a class 2 railway station located 481.50 km (299.2 mi) from Bangkok railway station.
