= Ubon Ratchathani Main Line =

Railway line in Thailand

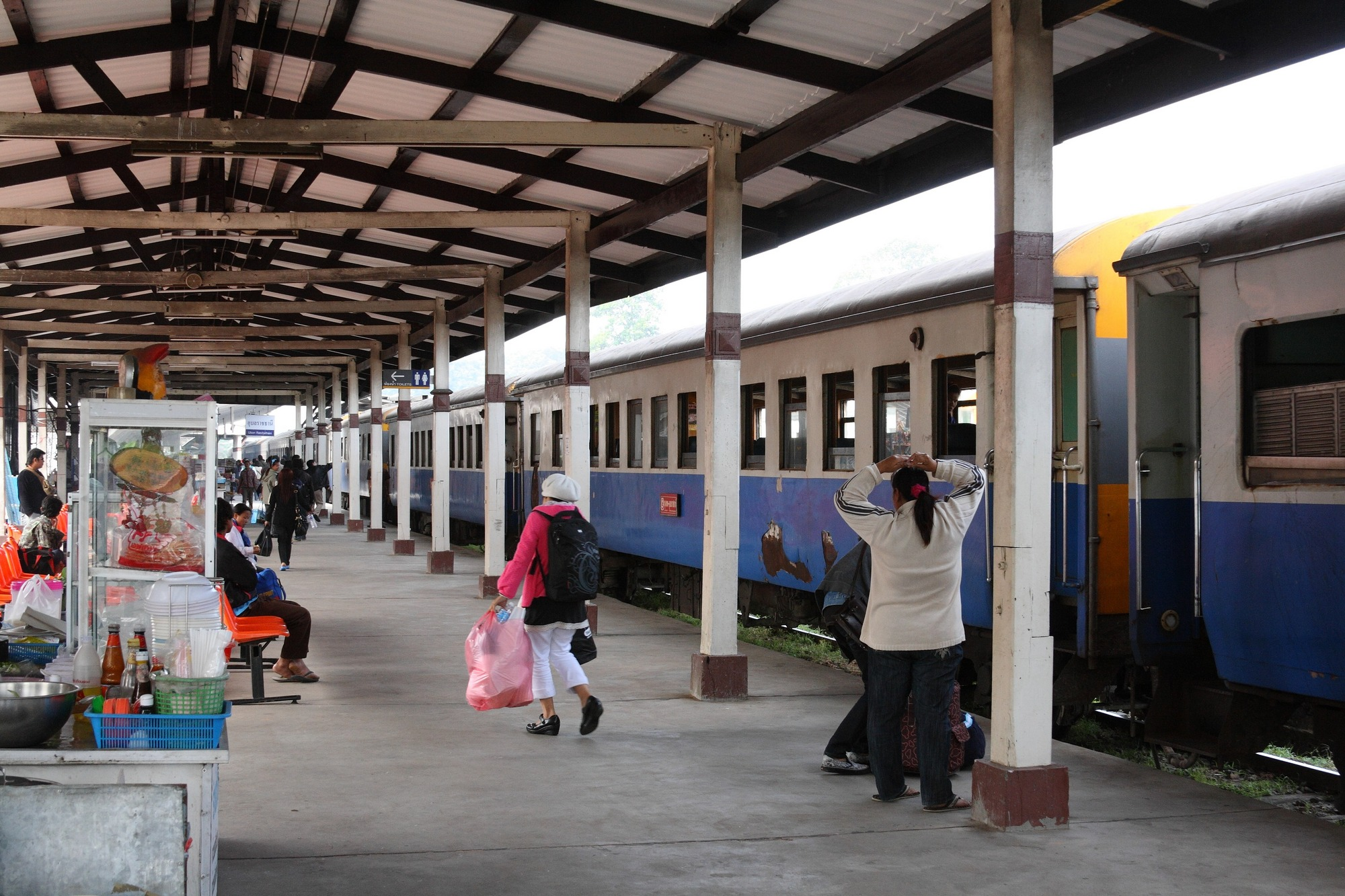

Overview
- Status: Operational
- Owner: State Railway of Thailand
- Locale: Phra Nakhon Si Ayutthaya Province; Saraburi Province; Nakhon Ratchasima Province; Buriram Province; Surin Province; Sisaket Province; Ubon Ratchathani Province
- Termini: Ban Phachi Junction; Ubon Ratchathani

Service
- Type: Inter-city rail
- System: Northeastern Line
- Operator(s): State Railway of Thailand
- Depot(s): Bang Sue Depot; Kaeng Khoi Depot; Nakhon Ratchasima Depot; Ubon Ratchathani Depot

History
- Opened: 26 March 1896

Technical
- Line length: 575.10 km (357.35 mi)
- Track gauge: 1,000 mm (3 ft 3 3/8 in) metre gauge

Ubon Ratchathani Main Line or Lower Isan Line is a railway line in Thailand. It runs from Ban Phachi Junction in the central to Ubon Ratchathani railway station in the lower northeastern, passes many provinces.

== History ==
=== Timeline ===
No.	Segment	Year opened
1	Bangkok (Hua Lamphong)–Ayutthaya	1896
2	Ayutthaya–Kaeng Khoi Junction	1897
3	Kaeng Khoi Junction–Muak Lek	1897
4	Muak Lek–Pak Chong	1899
5	Pak Chong–Nakhon Ratchasima	1900
6	Nakhon Ratchasima–Tha Chang	1922
7	Tha Chang–Buriram	1925
8	Buriram–Surin	1926
9	Surin–Huai Thap Than	1927
10	Huai Thap Than–Sisaket	1928
11	Sisaket–Ubon Ratchathani	1930

=== Name changes ===
Name	Old name	Year changed
Saraburi	Pak Phreaw	1934
Pang Asok	Pak Sok	—
Nakhon Ratchasima	Korat	1934
Thanon Chira Junction	Thanon Chira	1934

== Notable railway stations ==
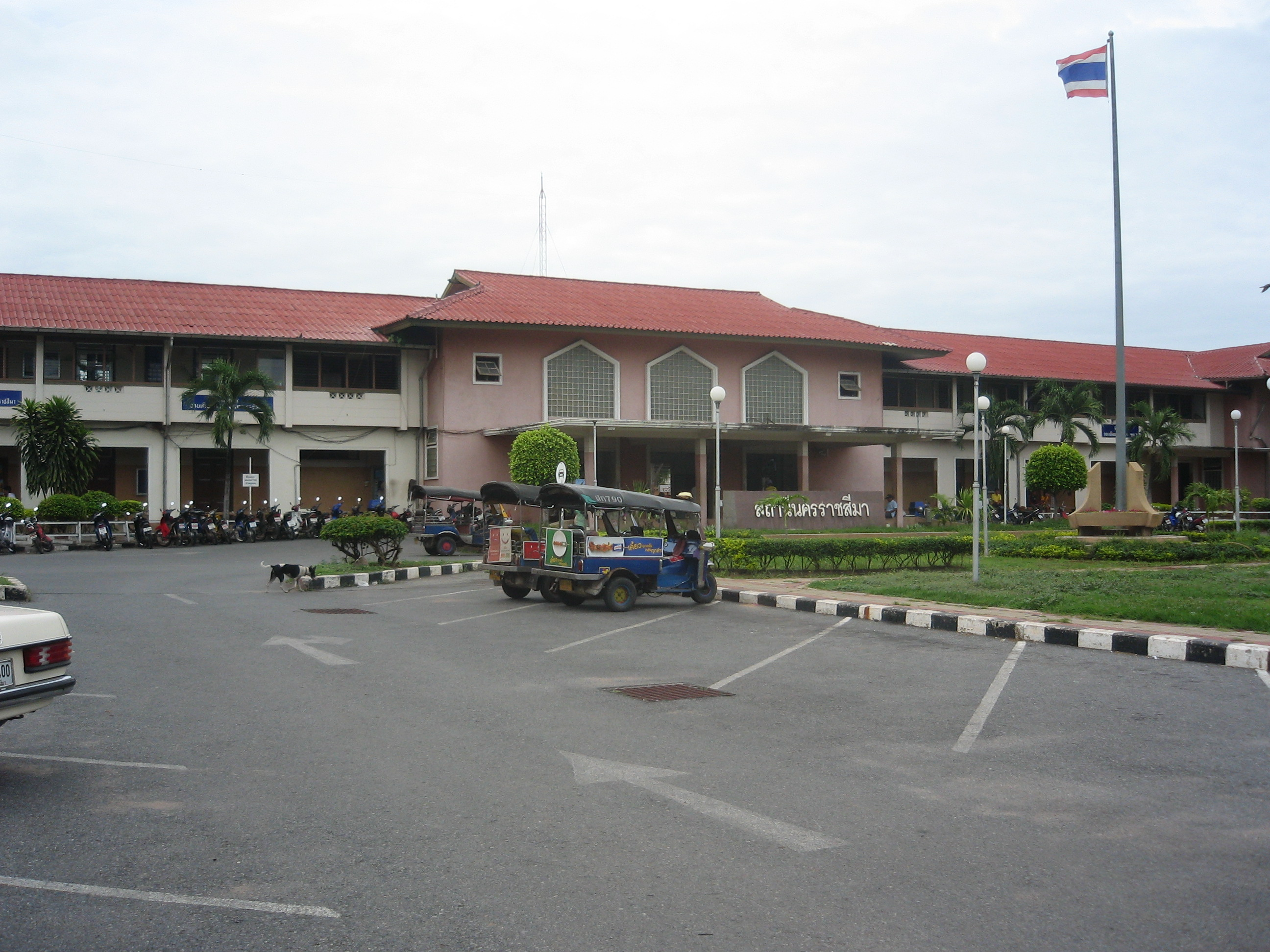
Nakhon Ratchasima Railway Station

- Saraburi Station - Provincial station, Pak Priaw station until 1934.
- Kaeng Khoi Junction - The Bua Yai Line and Khlong Sip Kao line diverge from the mainline here. Main Depot with refueling facility. The point for dividing freight trains into two trains to pass difficult section of Dong Phraya Yen (Kaeng Khoi - Pak Chong) or combining divided freight trains back into one train
- Pak Chong Station - The gateway to Nakhon Ratchasima and the point for dividing freight trains into two to pass difficult section of Dong Phraya Yen (Kaeng Khoi - Pak Chong) or combining divided freight trains back into one train
- Nakhon Ratchasima Station - Main depot of the Northeastern Line with refueling facility and a branch line to 2nd Army Support Command.
- Thanon Chira Junction - Junction for Nong Khai line close to Fort Suranaree (2nd Army Region HQ)
- Buri Ram Station - provincial station with a branch line to a quarry at Khao Kradong
- Surin Station - provincial station
- Si Sa Ket Station - provincial station
- Ubon Ratchathani Station in town of Warin Chamrap - Terminus of South Isaan Line (also known as Ubon Line) with Depot and refueling facility. Varindr station until 1942–1943.
