= Thanon Chira Junction railway station =

Railway station in Thailand

Coordinates: 14°58′3″N 102°6′6″E

Thanon Chira Junction ชุมทางถนนจิระ
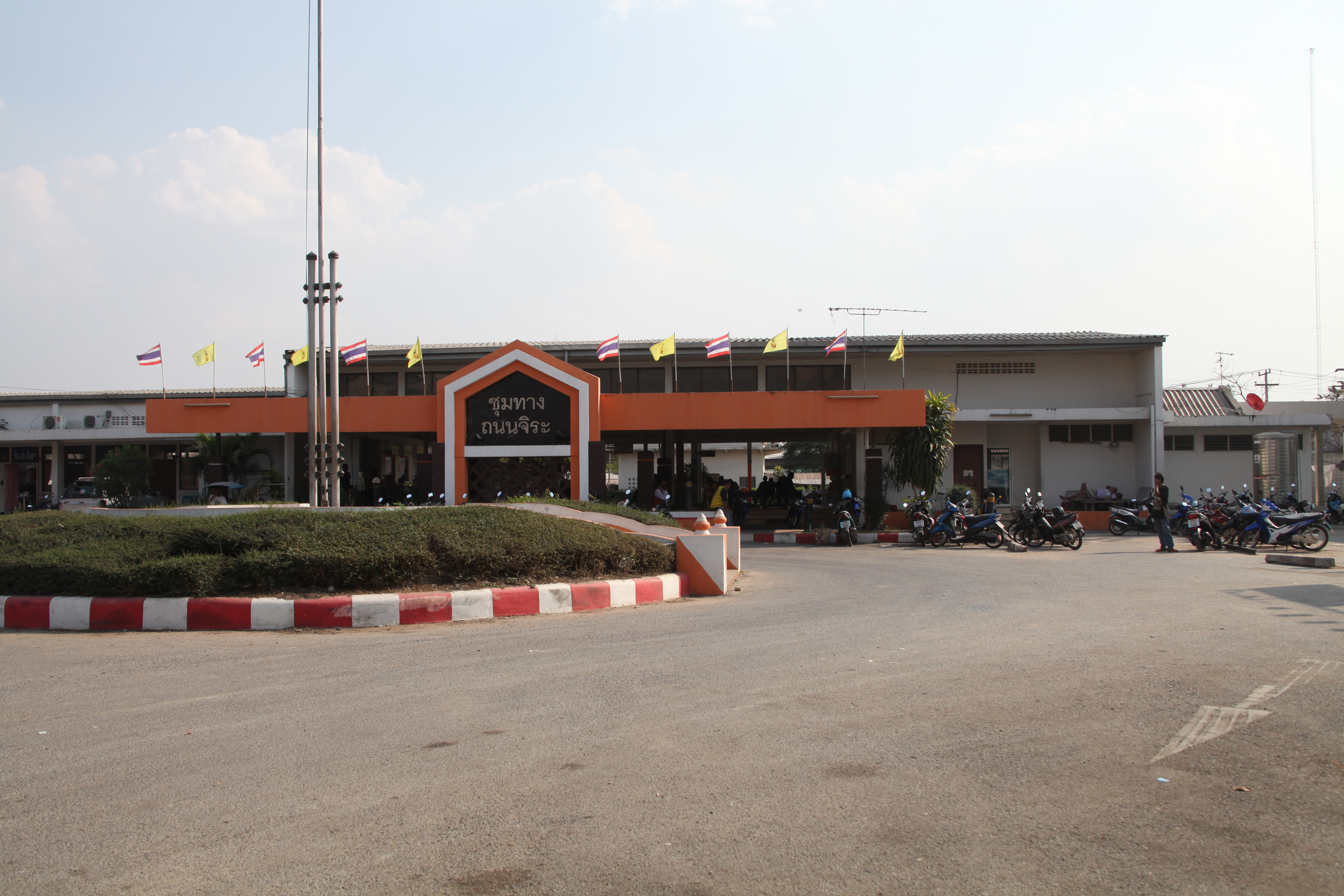
- Façade of station

General information
- Location: Watcharasarit Rd, Nai Mueang; Nakhon Ratchasima Province; Thailand
- Operator: State Railway of Thailand
- Platforms: 2
- Tracks: 6

Construction
- Structure type: Concrete building
- Parking: Yes
- Accessible: Yes

Other information
- Station code: จร.
- Classification: Class 1

History
- Opened: 1 November 1922
- Rebuilt: 1955

Passengers
- 64,000

Services
Preceding station	State Railway of Thailand	Following station
Nakhon Ratchasima towards Hua Lamphong or Krung Thep Aphiwat	Northeastern Line	Ban Phanao towards Ubon Ratchathani
Nakhon Ratchasima towards Hua Lamphong or Krung Thep Aphiwat	Northeastern Line	Ban Ko towards Khamsavath (Laos)
Location

Thanon Chira Junction railway station (SRT Code: TNJ) (Thai: สถานีรถไฟชุมทางถนนจิระ (จร.)) is the main railway station in Nakhon Ratchasima Province, Thailand. The station is on the south side of the city moat in Nakhon Ratchasima. There are 18 daily trains serving the station. There are also four to six special trains during the Thai New Year, Songkran, and other festivals. In the 2008 census, Thanon Chira Junction railway station served nearly 350,000 passengers.

== History ==
Thanon Chira Junction was opened on 1 November 1922 as the Thanon Chira railway station on part of the Tha Chang section of the Ubon Line (21 km). The station became a junction in 1934 once the line to Khon Kaen was completed, and opened on 1 April 1933. The location of the station is important because it is close to both Nakhon Ratchasima and the gate of Fort Suranaree (the headquarters of 2nd Army Region). Initially, the station was a wooden structure until after World War II, when a concrete structure replaced the dilapidated wooden station. The station has a container crane to handle container loading.

== Train services ==
- Diesel rail car special express train No. 21 from Bangkok to Ubon Ratchathani
- Diesel rail car special express train No. 22 from Ubon Ratchathani to Bangkok
- Express train No. 67 from Bangkok to Ubon Ratchathani
- Express train No. 68 from Ubon Ratchathani to Bangkok
- Diesel rail car express train No. 71 from Bangkok to Ubon Ratchathani
- Diesel rail car express train No. 72 from Ubon Ratchathani to Bangkok
- Diesel rail car express train No. 77 from Bangkok to Nong Khai
- Diesel rail car express train No. 78 Nong Khai to Bangkok
- Rapid train No. 135 from Bangkok to Ubon Ratchathani
- Rapid train No. 136 from Ubon Ratchathani to Bangkok
- Rapid train No. 139 from Bangkok to Ubon Ratchathani
- Rapid train No. 140 from Ubon Ratchathani to Bangkok
- Rapid train No. 141 from Bangkok to Ubon Ratchathani
- Rapid train No. 142 from Ubon Ratchathani to Bangkok
- Rapid train No. 145 from Bangkok to Ubon Ratchathani
- Rapid train No. 146 from Ubon Ratchathani to Bangkok
- Ordinary train No. 233 from Bangkok to Surin
- Ordinary train No. 234 from Surin to Bangkok
- Local train No. 415 from Nakhon Ratchasima to Nong Khai
- Local train No. 418 from Nong Khai to Nakhon Ratchasima
- Local train No. 416 from Nakhon Ratchasima to Udon Thani
- Local train No. 417 from Udon Thani to Nakhon Ratchasima
- Local train No. 419 from Nakhon Ratchasima to Ubon Ratchathani
- Local train No. 420 from Ubon Ratchathani to Nakhon Ratchasima
- Local train No. 421 from Nakhon Ratchasima to Ubon Ratchathani
- Local train No. 426 from Ubon Ratchathani to Nakhon Ratchasima
- Local train No. 424 from Samrong Thap to Nakhon Ratchasima
- Local train No. 427 from Nakhon Ratchasima to Ubon Ratchathani
- Local train No. 428 from Ubon Ratchathani to Nakhon Ratchasima
- Local train No. 429 from Nakhon Ratchasima to Bua Yai Junction
- Local train No. 430 from Bua Yai Junction to Nakhon Ratchasima
- Local train No. 431 from Kaeng Khoi Junction to Khon Kaen
- Local train No. 432 from Khon Kaen to Kaeng Khoi Junction
