= Bua Yai Junction railway station =

Railway station in Thailand

Bua Yai Junction ชุมทางบัวใหญ่
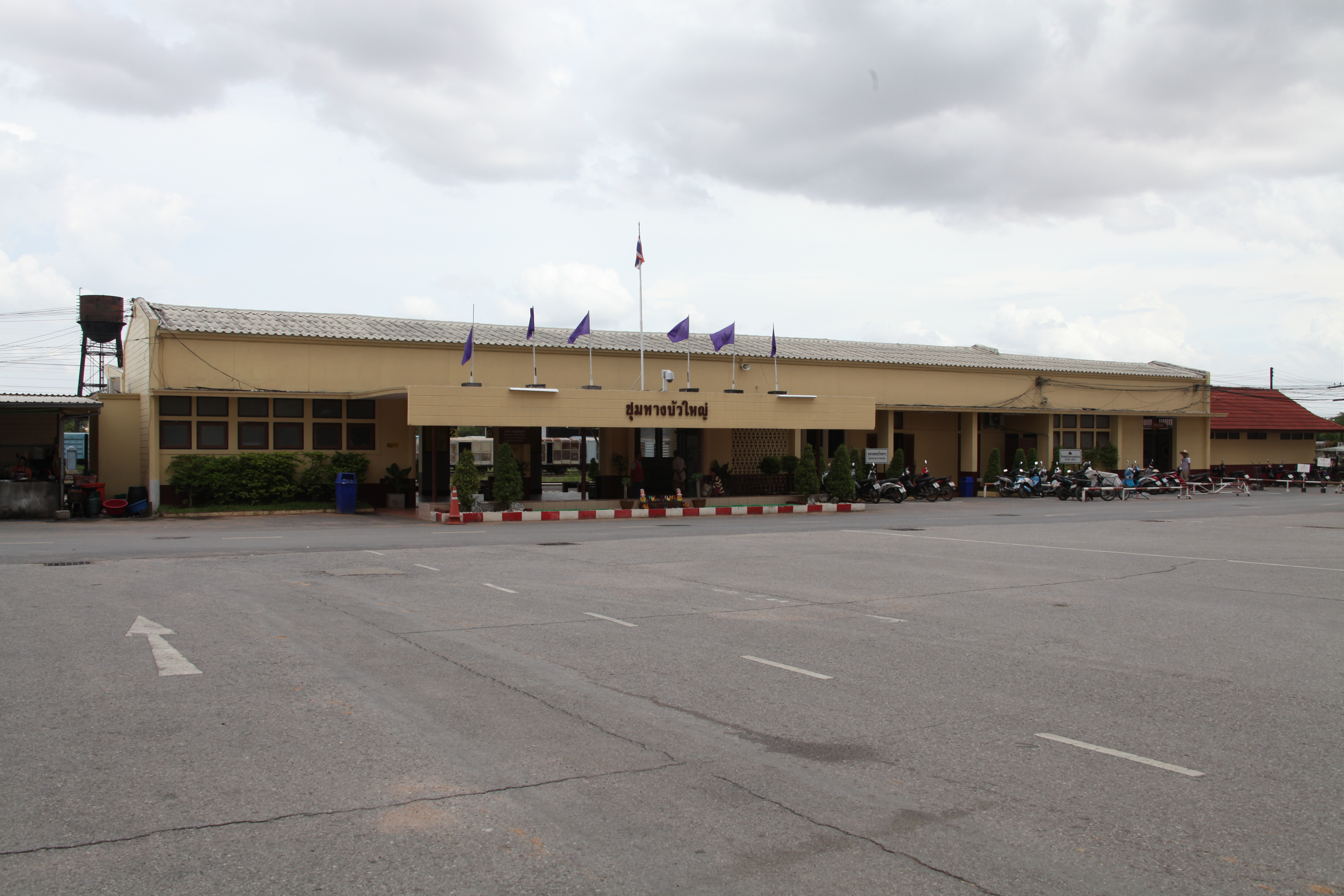
- Bua Yai Junction railway station before refurbishment

General information
- Location: Kanrotfai Rd, Bua Yai Sub-district, Bua Yai district Nakhon Ratchasima province Thailand
- Coordinates: 15°35′9″N 102°25′38″E
- Operator: State Railway of Thailand
- Lines: Nong Khai Main Line; Lam Narai Branch
- Platforms: 4
- Tracks: 7

Construction
- Structure type: Concrete building
- Parking: Yes
- Accessible: Yes

Other information
- Station code: วญ.
- Classification: Class 1

History
- Opened: 1 May 1931; 95 years ago

Passengers
- 64,000

Services
Preceding station	State Railway of Thailand	Following station
Huai Rahat Halt towards Hua Lamphong or Krung Thep Aphiwat	Northeastern Line	Noen Sawat Halt towards Khamsavath (Laos)
Ban Sok Rang Halt towards Kaeng Khoi Junction	Northeastern Line Kaeng Khoi–Bua Yai Branch	Terminus
Location

Bua Yai Junction station (Thai: สถานีชุมทางบัวใหญ่, RTGS: Sathani Chumthang Bua Yai; SRT code: วญ.) is a 1st class station and the main railway station in Nakhon Ratchasima province. The station is in the northern part of Nakhon Ratchasima Province. There are 10 daily trains serving this station. There are four to six special trains additionally at the New Year, Songkran, or other holidays. In the 2004 census, Bua Yai Junction Station served nearly 800,000 passengers.

== History ==
Bua Yai Junction station was opened for service as Bua Yai Station on 1 May 1931 (then called Khorat Station). Initially, it was served by mixed train from Nakhon Ratchasima. The express stopped at this station for 10 minute watering and refueling pause after the introduction of Khon Kaen Express on 3 November 1939. Bua Yai Station became Bua Yai Junction on 19 August 1967, in conjunction with the opening of Kaeng Khoi–Bua Yai bypass route (Lam Narai Branch Line). This station was a drop-off point for Chaiyaphum Province (50 km from Bua Yai station) until the opening of Kaeng Khoi - Bua Yai route which changed the drop-off point for Chaiyaphum Province to Chatturat Station (40 km from Chatturat station). There are still intercity bus services from Bua Yai to Chaiyaphum as the bus terminal is just 500 meters from Bua Yai Junction. However, the traffic between Bua Yai to Nakhon Ratchasima main depends upon railway services because there is no bus service between Bua Yai and Nakhon Ratchasima.

The station was rebuilt in 2019 as part of the double tracking project between Thanon Chira Junction and Khon Kaen.
