= Kaeng Khoi Junction railway station =

Railway station in Saraburi, Thailand

Coordinates: 14.5869°N 101.0040°E

Kaeng Khoi Junction ชุมทางแก่งคอย
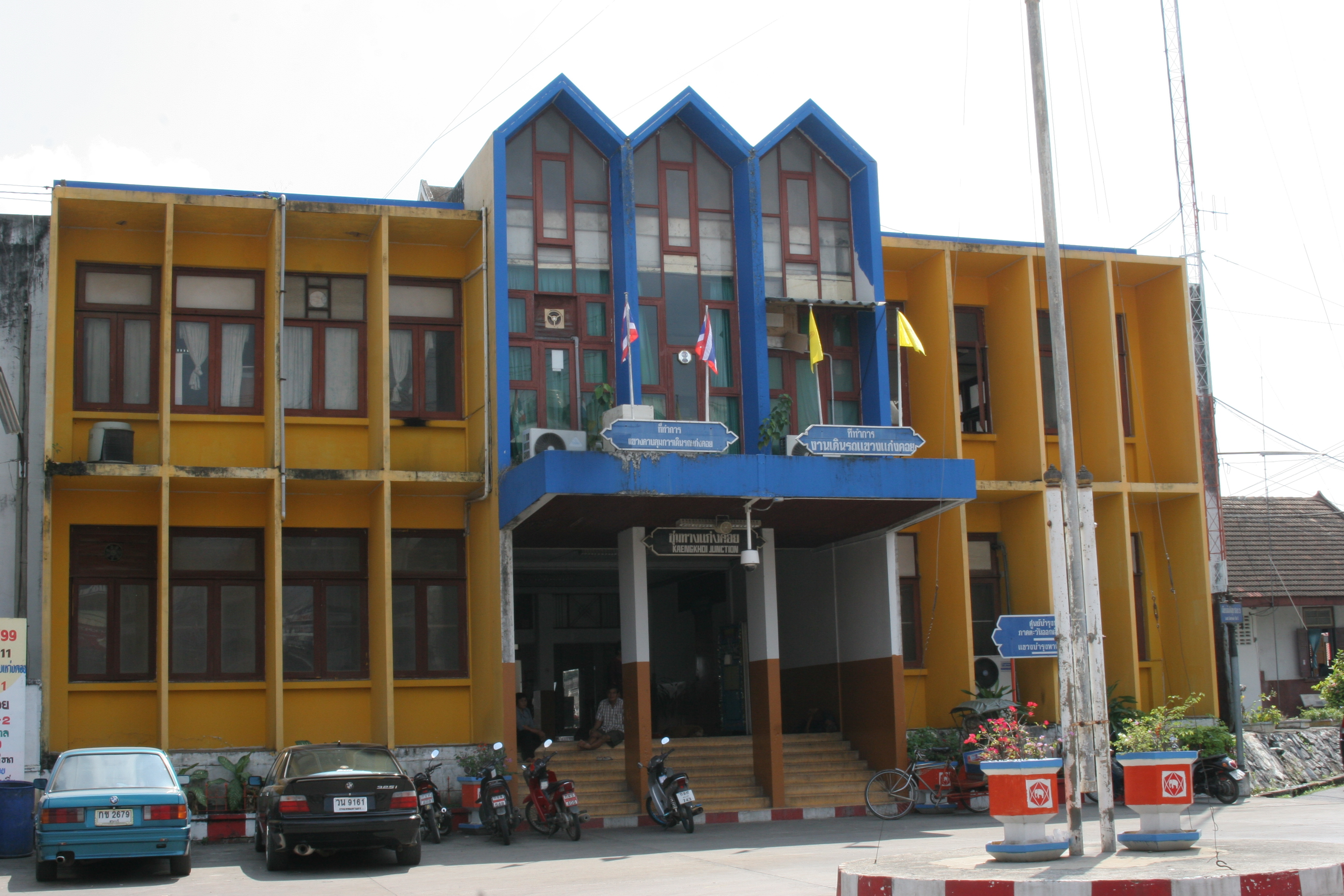

General information
- Location: Riabsantisuk Road, Kaeng Khoi Subdistrict, Kaeng Khoi district Saraburi; Thailand
- Operator: State Railway of Thailand
- Manager: Ministry of Transport
- Lines: Ubon Ratchathani Main Line; Lam Narai Branch Line; Phra Phutthachai Line
- Platforms: 4
- Tracks: 15

Construction
- Structure type: Concrete building
- Parking: Yes

Other information
- Station code: กค.
- Classification: Class 1

History
- Opened: 1 May 1897; 129 years ago

Services
Preceding station	State Railway of Thailand	Following station
Nong Bua Junction towards Hua Lamphong or Krung Thep Aphiwat	Northeastern Line	Map Kabao towards Ubon Ratchathani or Khamsavath (Laos)
Terminus	Northeastern Line Kaeng Khoi–Bua Yai Branch	Ban Chong Tai towards Bua Yai Junction
Ban Phai Na Bun Junction towards Khlong Sip Kao Junction	Eastern Line Phra Phutthachai Freight Line	Terminus
Location

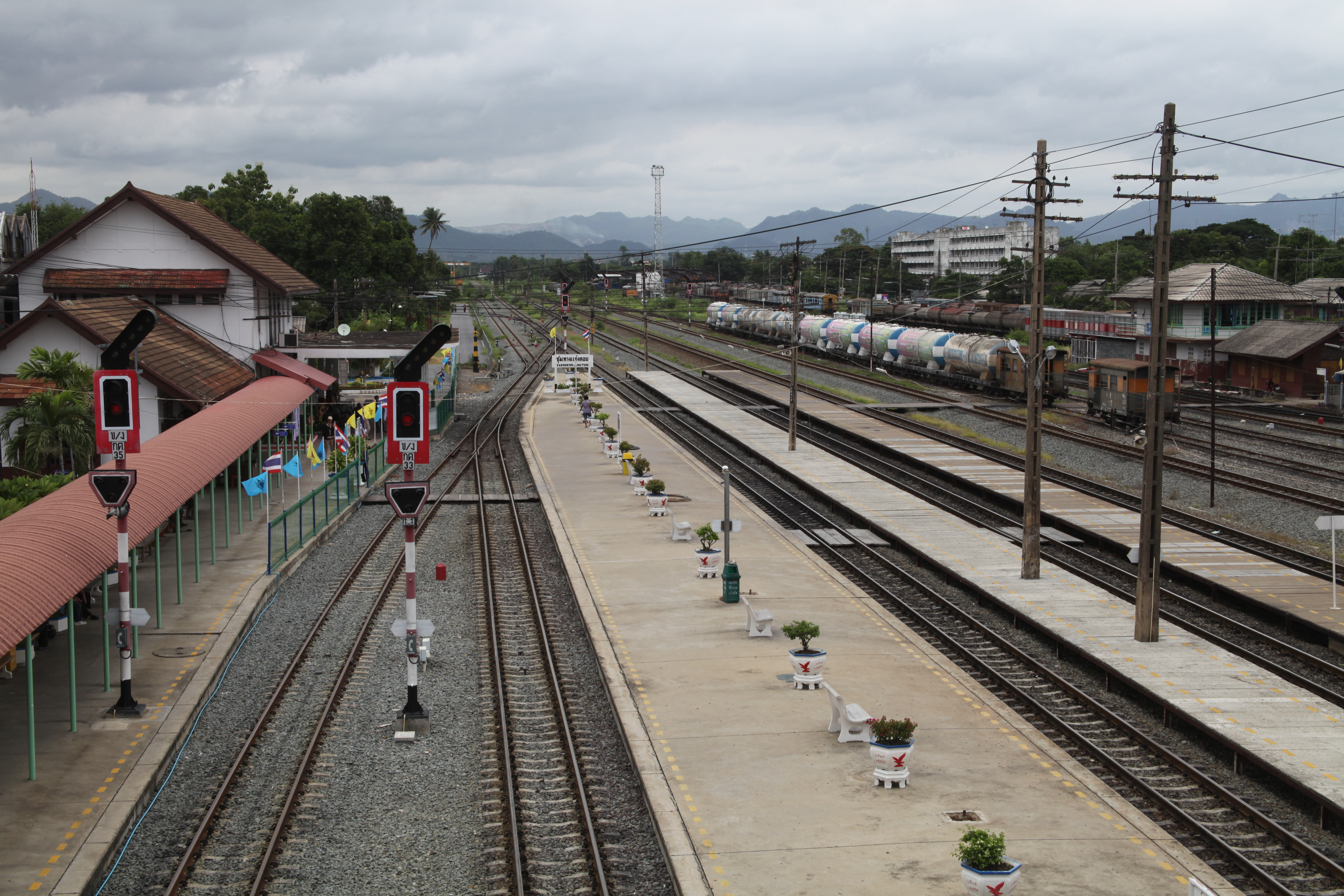
Platforms

Kaeng Khoi Junction railway station is a railway station located in Kaeng Khoi Subdistrict, Kaeng Khoi district, Saraburi province. It is a class 1 railway station located 125.106 km (77.7 mi) from Bangkok railway station. It opened on May 1, 1897 as part of the Northeastern Line Ayutthaya–Kaeng Khoi Junction section. In 1956, the station became a junction when a line branched off to Suranarai Station. Then in 1995, another line from Khlong Sip Kao Junction for freight trains only linked to the Northeastern Mainline.
