= Ubon Ratchathani railway station =

Railway station in Ubon Ratchathani, Thailand

Coordinates: 15.2005°N 104.8587°E

Ubon Ratchathani อุบลราชธานี
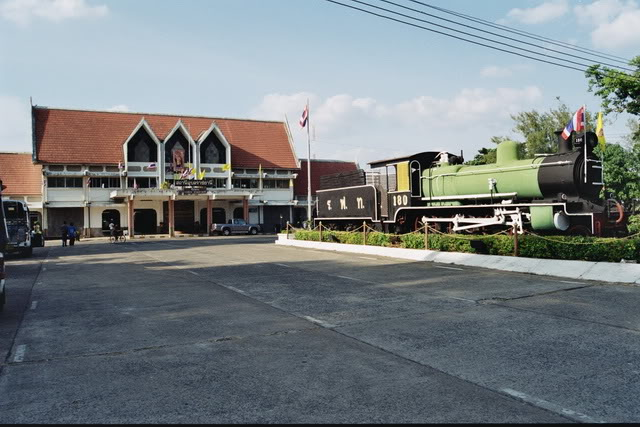
- Ubon Ratchathani railway station, terminal station of Ubon Ratchathani Main Line

General information
- Location: Rotfai Road, Warin Chamrap Subdistrict, Warin Chamrap District; Ubon Ratchathani; Thailand
- Operator: State Railway of Thailand
- Manager: Ministry of Transport
- Line: Ubon Ratchathani Main Line
- Platforms: 2
- Tracks: 5

Construction
- Structure type: At-grade

Other information
- Station code: อน.
- Classification: Class 1

History
- Opened: 1 April 1930; 96 years ago
- Former names: Warin

Services
Preceding station	State Railway of Thailand	Following station
Bung Wai towards Hua Lamphong or Krung Thep Aphiwat	Northeastern Line	Terminus
Location

Ubon Ratchathani railway station (Thai: สถานีรถไฟอุบลราชธานี) is a railway station located in Warin Chamrap Subdistrict, Warin Chamrap District, Ubon Ratchathani, It is a class 1 railway station located 575.1 km (357.4 mi) from Bangkok railway station. The station opened in April 1, 1930 as Warin station as part of the Northeastern Line Si Sa Ket–Ubon Ratchathani section. Its name was changed to Ubon Rat Thani around 1942, and again to the current spelling of Ubon Ratchathani.

In front of the station, there is a decommissioned 180 Unit NBL steam locomotive on display.
