= Khamsavath railway station =

Railway station in Laos

Vientiane (Khamsavath) ວຽງຈັນ (ຄໍາສະຫວາດ)
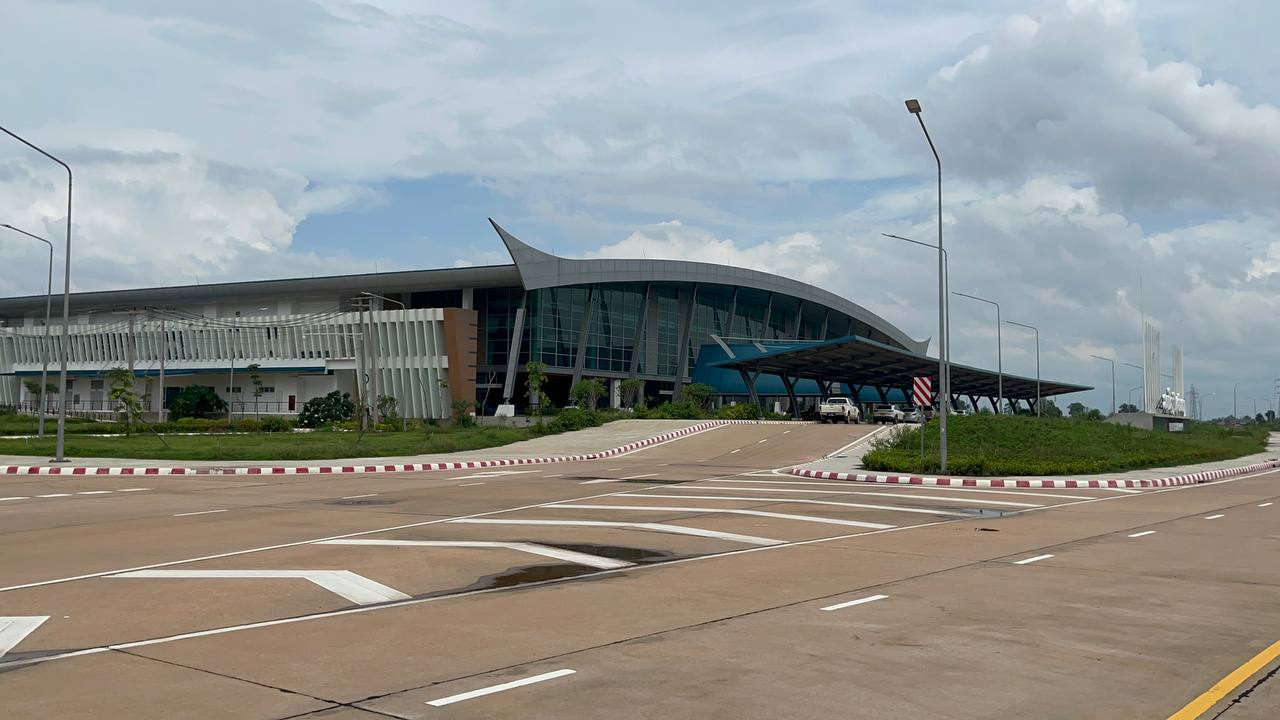
- The station as seen from the driveway entrance.

General information
- Location: Nonvai village, Xaysetha district Vientiane prefecture Laos
- Coordinates: 17°57′27″N 102°40′29″E
- Operator: State Railway of Thailand
- Manager: Lao National Railway State Enterprise
- Transit authority: Ministry of Public Works and Transport
- Platforms: 3
- Tracks: 4
- Connections: Bus Route 12 (Central Bus Station/Lao China Railway Station)

Construction
- Structure type: At-grade
- Platform levels: 2
- Parking: Yes
- Accessible: No Level Boarding

Other information
- Status: Staffed

History
- Opened: 31 October 2023; 2 years ago (official); 19 July 2024; 2 years ago (first services)

Services
Preceding station	State Railway of Thailand	Following station
Thanaleng (Laos) towards Hua Lamphong or Krung Thep Aphiwat	Northeastern Line	Terminus
Location
- Location within Laos

Khamsavath railway station (Lao: ສະຖານີຄຳສະຫວາດ), also known as Vientiane (Khamsavath) railway station and Vientiane-Tai railway station is a railway station located in Nonvai Village, Xaysetha district, Vientiane prefecture, Laos. It is the second railway station serving Vientiane on the State Railway of Thailand's Northeastern Line, located 7.5 km (4.7 mi) from the former terminus, Thanaleng station, providing a direct railway connection to Bangkok.

== History ==
Construction began on 1 October 2019, with plans of completion by 2021, but was pushed back to May 2023 due to delays caused by the COVID-19 pandemic. The station was officially opened on 31 October 2023, by Lao president Thongloun Sisoulith and Thai prime minister Srettha Thavisin.

Direct cross-border sleeper train services from Bangkok's Krung Thep Aphiwat Central Terminal commenced on 19 July 2024. Train services are operated by the State Railway of Thailand drivers until Nong Khai, before the train is operated by Lao National Railway drivers to the station. The service utilizes former JR West rolling stock for sleeper and second-class trains, being the only regularly scheduled train to use this stock in Thailand. Upon the station's opening, the former terminus, Thanaleng closed to passenger service and became a freight terminal.

== Facilities ==
The station has 3 platforms, 6 immigration desks, ticket offices for trains towards Thailand, Laos and China, food facilities and offices for the Lao National Railway. However, there is no level boarding at the station.

Connecting bus services are available towards the city and the Laos China Railway station, as well as taxi services operated at a fixed price. Bus fares are 20,000 kip for adults to the Central Bus Station in the city, with the same prices applying for those heading towards the Vientiane railway station.

The station also features a car park, a large drop off and pick up point for passengers, and stylised signage reading "Vientiane (ວຽງຈັນ)".

== Train services ==
There are daily services to Bangkok and Udon Thani, the latter being popular among Laotian tourists. Rapid 133 and 134 are sleeper trains, with former Japanese coaches plying the route.

- Rapid 133/134 Krung Thep Aphiwat – Vientiane (Khamsavath) – Krung Thep Aphiwat
- Rapid 147/148 Udon Thani – Vientiane (Khamsavath) – Nong Khai

== Gallery ==
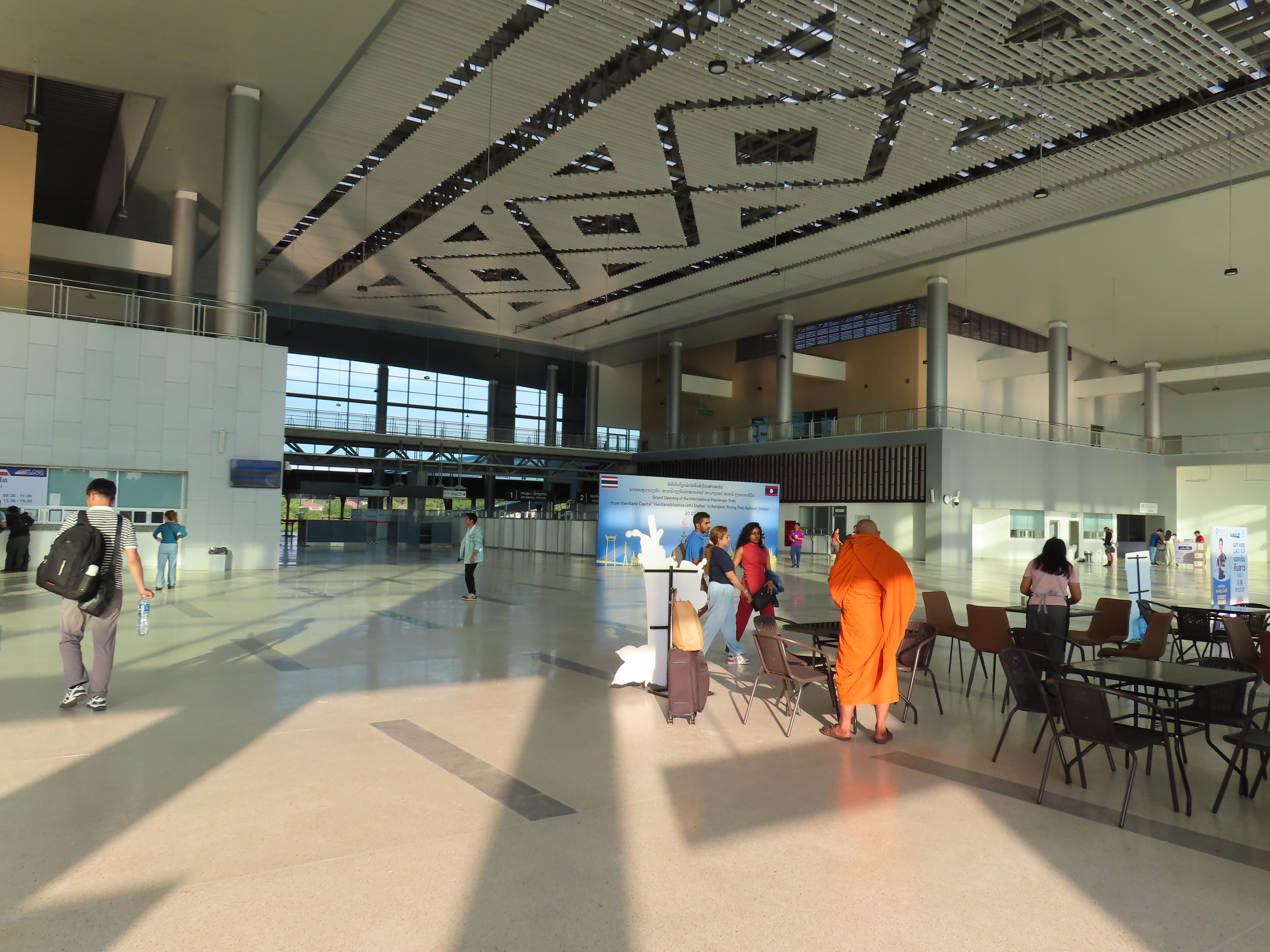
Inside Khamsavath railway station

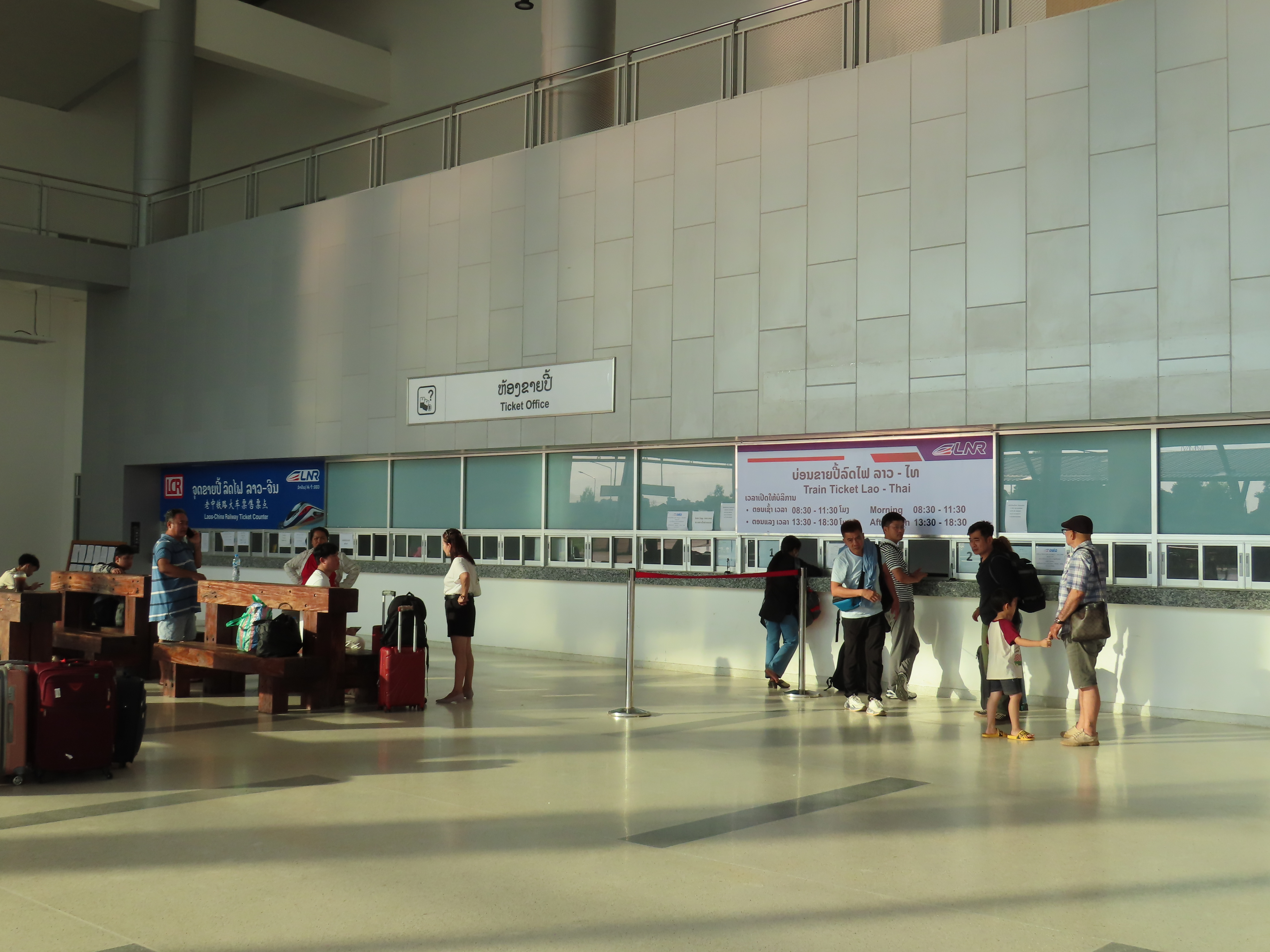
Khamsavath railway station ticket office

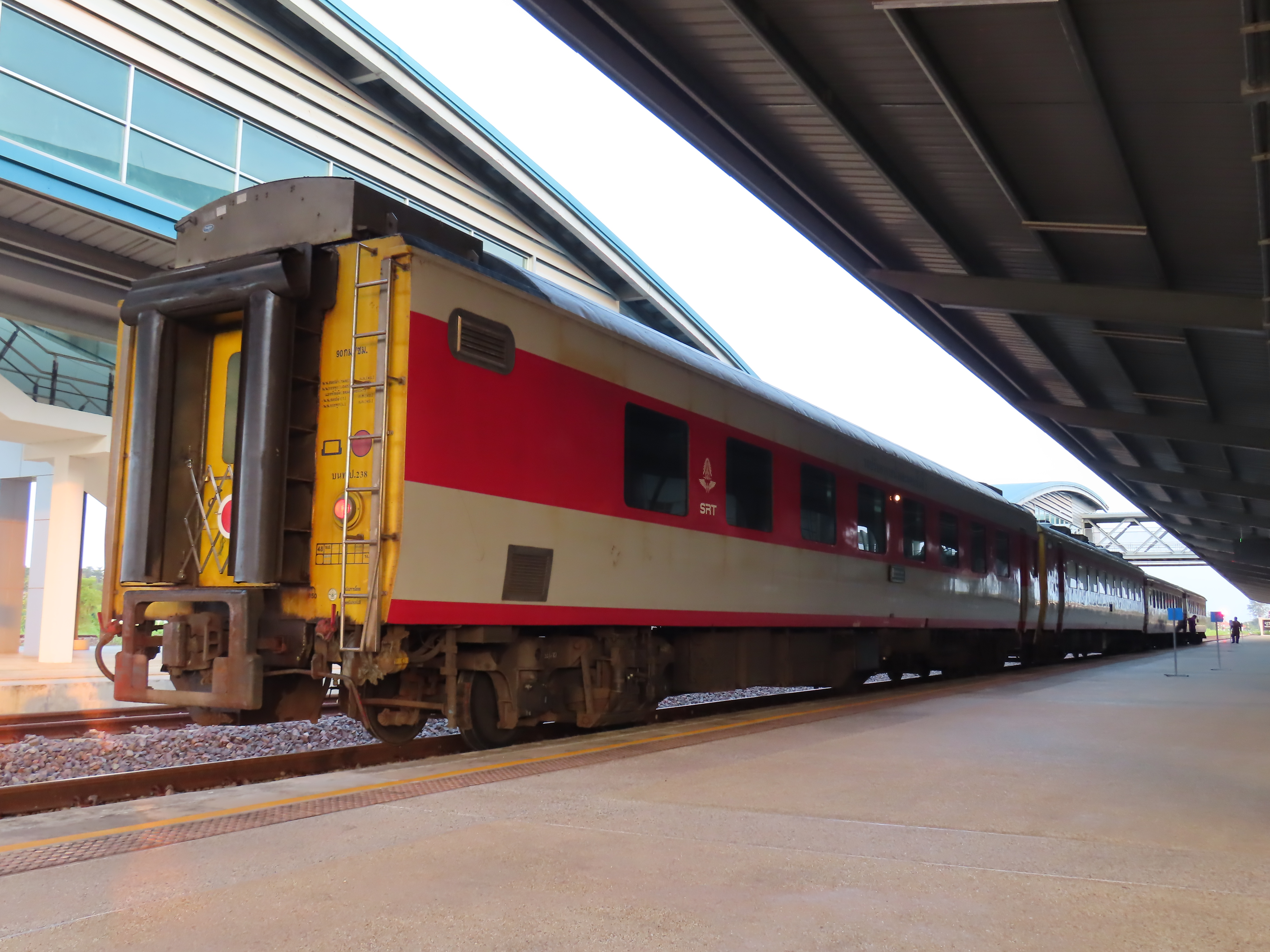
Passenger train at station platform

== See also ==
- Transport in Laos
- Vientiane railway station
