= Northeastern Line (Thailand) =

Railway line in Thailand

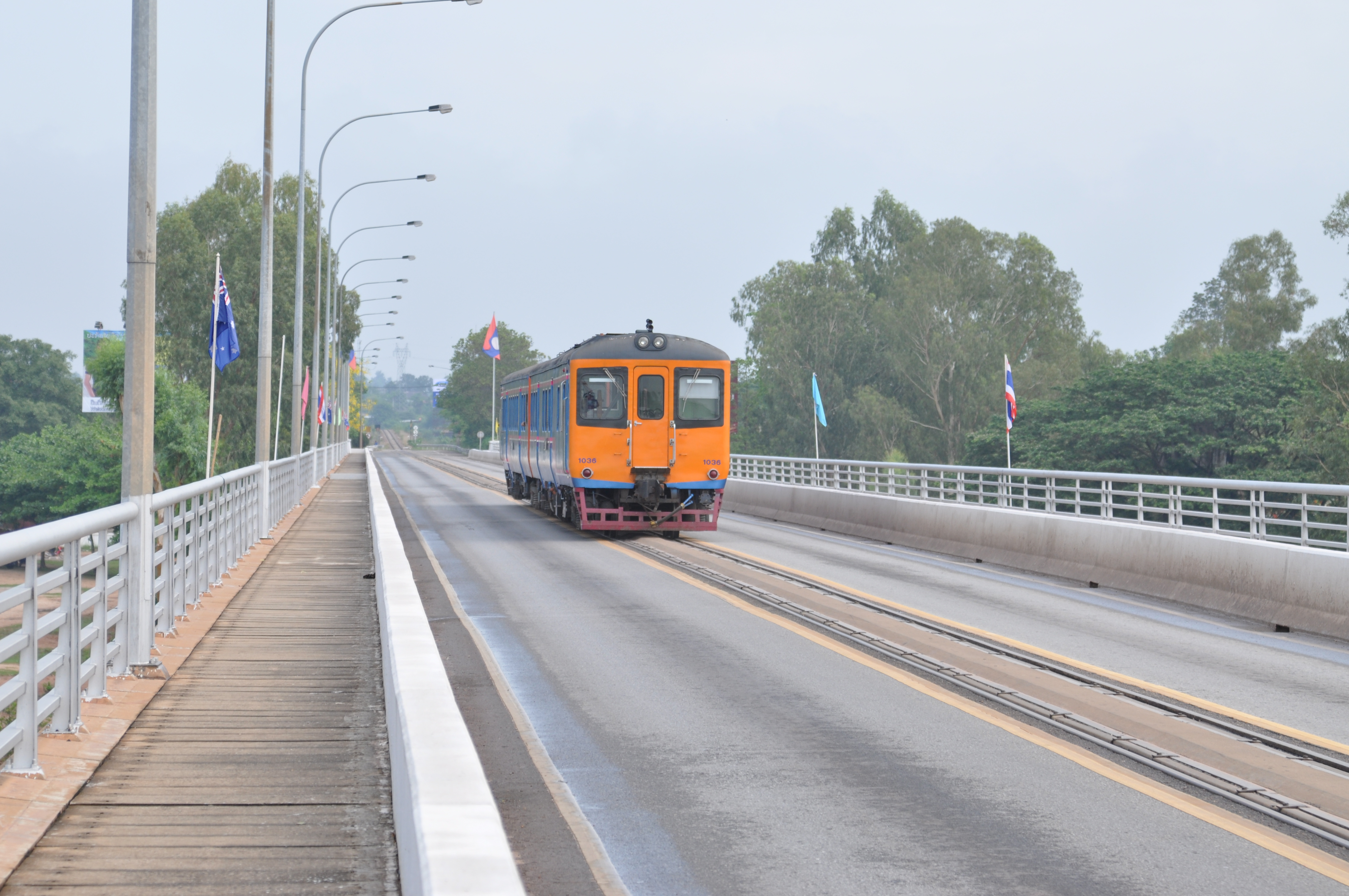
- Street running RHN1036 train across the First Thai–Lao Friendship Bridge

Overview
- Status: Operational
- Owner: Government of Thailand
- Locale: Isan; Central Thailand; Vientiane Prefecture
- Termini: Bangkok (Hua Lamphong) Krung Thep Aphiwat Central Terminal; Ubon Ratchathani Khamsavath (Laos)
- Connecting lines: Ubon Ratchathani Main Line; Nong Khai Main Line; Lam Narai Branch Line

Service
- Type: Inter-city rail; Regional rail; Commuter rail; Freight rail
- Operator: State Railway of Thailand
- Depots: Bang Sue; Kaeng Khoi; Nakhon Ratchasima; Ubon Ratchathani

History
- Work began: 9 March 1891; 135 years ago
- Opened: 26 March 1896; 130 years ago
- Last extension: 31 October 2023; 2 years ago
- Completed: 19 August 1967; 59 years ago

Technical
- Line length: Ubon Ratchathani Main Line: 575 km (357 mi); Nong Khai Main Line: 627.5 km (389.9 mi)
- Number of tracks: 2–1
- Track gauge: 1,000 mm (3 ft 3 3/8 in) metre gauge

The Northeastern Line (Thai: ทางรถไฟสายตะวันออกเฉียงเหนือ, romanized: Thangrotfaisaitawanokchiangnuea) is a railway line in Thailand that connects the capital Bangkok with the northeast region of Isan. The section from Bangkok to Nakhon Ratchasima is Thailand's first line that opened for passenger service. The line is also a key section on the central route of the Kunming–Singapore railway.

== Route description ==
The Northeastern Line shares tracks with Northern Line between Bangkok and Ban Phachi Junction. It has three main branches:

- Ubon Ratchathani Main Line, between Bangkok and Ubon Ratchathani
- Nong Khai Main Line, between Bangkok and Nong Khai, branching off after Nakhon Ratchasima. The line also crosses the Thai-Lao border into Thanaleng, with an extension to Khamsavath railway station being opened in 2023.
- Lam Narai Branch Line

== Timeline ==
=== Ubon Ratchathani Main Line ===
- 9 March 1891 - started construction
- 26 March 1896 - opened Bangkok – Ayutthaya
- 1 November 1897 - Ayutthaya – Kaeng Khoi
- 21 December 1900 - opened Kaeng Khoi – Nakhon Ratchasima
- 1 November 1922 - opened Nakhon Ratchasima – Tha Chang near a pier on Mun river that allowed boat service between Tha Chang and Ubon Ratchathani along Mun river
- 1 April 1925 - opened Tha Chang – Buriram
- 1 August 1928 - opened Buriram – Sisaket
- 1 April 1930 - opened Sisaket – Ubon Ratchathani

SRT also built a short railway line from Bung Wai to Ban Pho Mun which was opened on 1 August 1930, but the line was closed on 1 December 1954 due to the construction of Seri Prachathippatai bridge (officially opened in 1955) that allowed the connection between Ubon Ratchathani city and Ubon Ratchathani without the need for ferry across Mun river.

As part of the double tracking project, a new railway line between Map Kabao and Muak Lek was constructed to bypass the mountainous curved route through the Dong Phaya Yen forest. The section includes Pha Sadet Tunnel, which is now Thailand's longest railway tunnel at 5.408 km long, and Hin Lap Tunnel. The line initially opened for passenger services on 28 July 2024. However, after the passage of three trains through the tunnels, reports of significant dust and particulate remnants from the construction blowing into the open-air carriages prompted SRT to temporarily suspend railway services for a cleanup of the railway line. The line reopened on 16 December 2024, resulting in the cessation of passenger services at Pha Sadet and Hin Lap railway stations. The latter station remaining in operation for freight services to the TPI Polene cement factory. The section also includes a new elevated station at Muak Lek to replace the current station, however this section is yet to open.

=== Nong Khai Main Line ===
- 1 April 1933 - opened Nakhon Ratchasima – Khon Kaen
- 24 June 1941 - Khon Kaen – Udon Thani
- 13 September 1955 - Udon Thani – Na Tha (first Nong Khai station)
- 31 July 1958 - Na Tha – Nong Khai (Talat Nong Khai, second Nong Khai station)
- 2008 - Nong Khai (third and current Nong Khai station) – Talat Nong Khai section closed.
- 5 March 2009 - Nong Khai – Thanaleng (Vientiane Prefecture)
- 31 October 2023 - Thanaleng – Khamsavath (Vientiane Prefecture)

=== Kaeng Khoi–Bua Yai (Lam Narai) Branch Line ===
- 19 August 1967 - entire Kaeng Khoi Junction–Bua Yai Junction line opened.

== Gallery ==
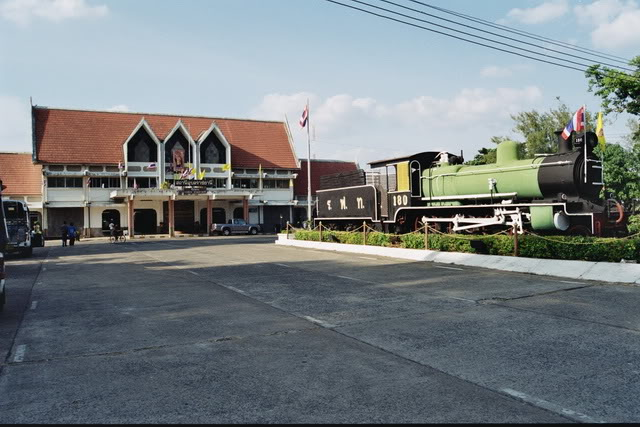
Ubon Ratchathani railway station, terminal station of the Ubon Ratchathani Main Line

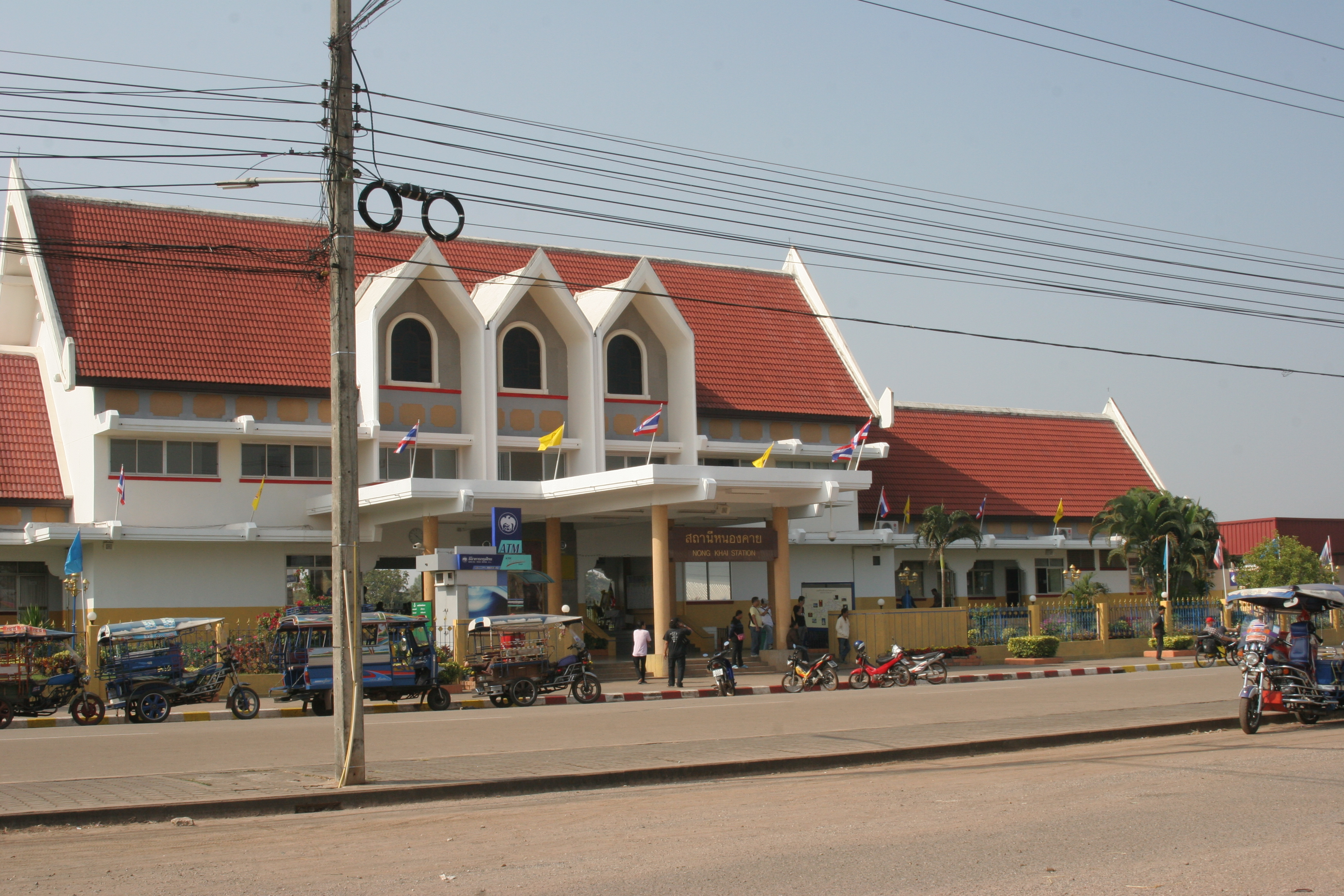
Nong Khai railway station, a railway station located near the Laos–Thailand border

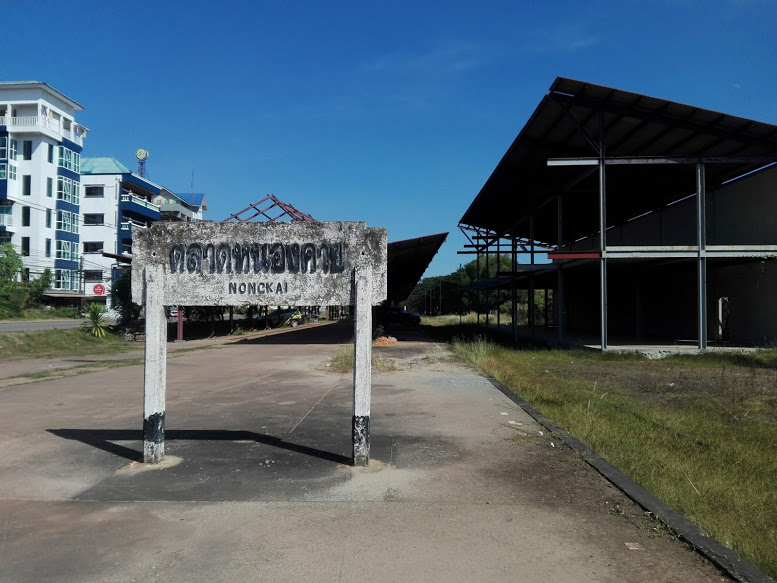
Former Nong Khai (Talat Nong Khai) railway station near the River Mekong

== See also ==
- List of Northeastern Line (Thailand) stations
- Rail transport in Laos
- Boten–Vientiane railway
- Kaeng Khoi Line: railway line of the Greater Bangkok commuter rail
- Northern Line (Thailand)
- Eastern Line (Thailand)
- Southern Line (Thailand)
