= List of railway stations in Buriram province =

Railway stations in Buriram Province, Thailand (From West to East)

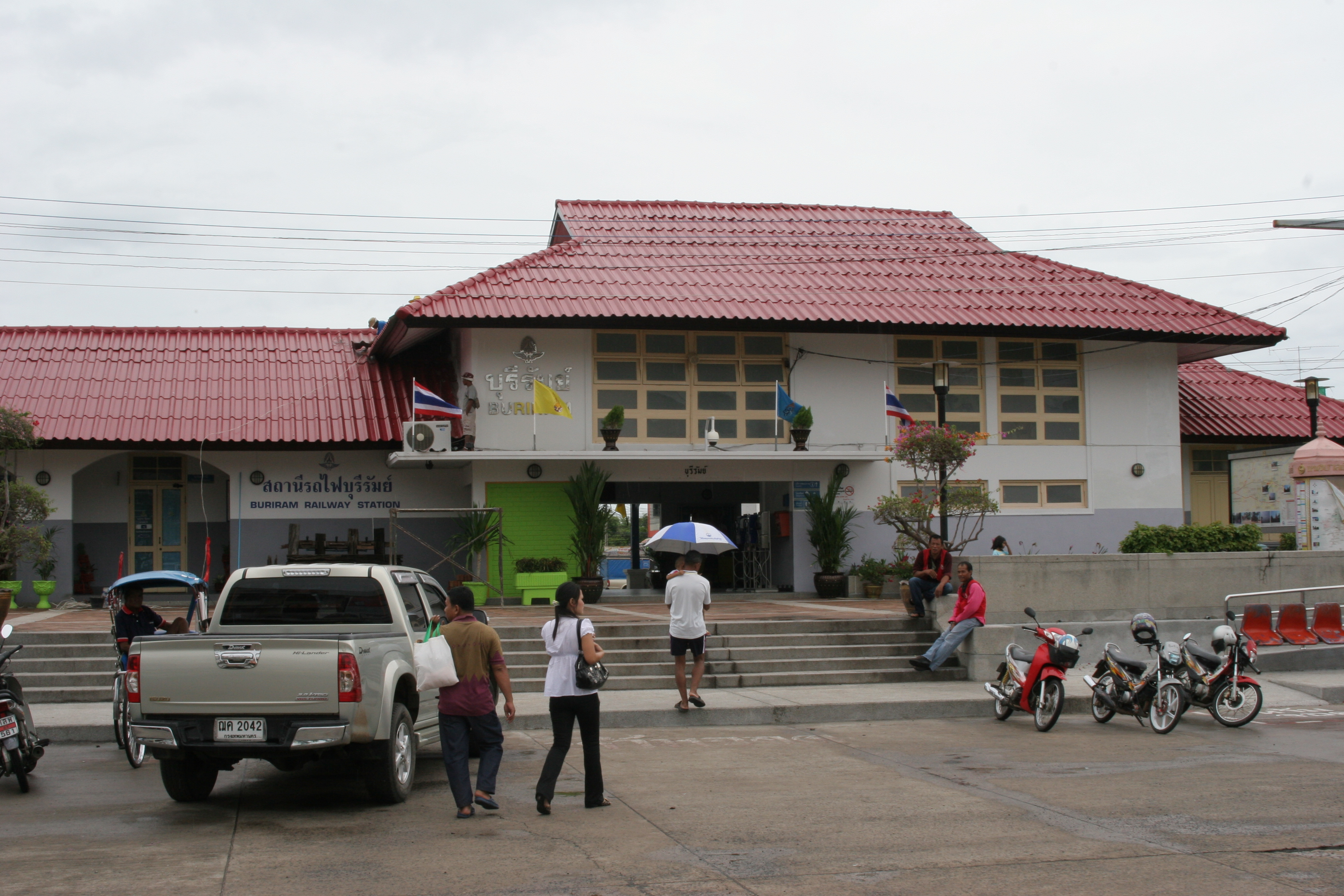
Buriram Railway Station

No.	Code	Station	Thai Name	K.M.	Class	Passenger (2013)	District	Note
1.	2227	Nong Krathing railway station	สถานีรถไฟหนองกระทิง	337.50	3	?	Lam Plai Mat District	
2.	2229	Lam Plai Mat railway station	สถานีรถไฟลำปลายมาศ	345.70	2	?	Lam Plai Mat District	
3.	2231	Thamen Chai railway station	สถานีรถไฟทะเมนชัย	354.85	3	?	Lam Plai Mat District	
4.	2233	Ban Salaeng Phan railway station	สถานีรถไฟบ้านแสลงพัน	363.30	3	?	Lam Plai Mat District	
5.	2234	Ban Nong Tat railway station	สถานีรถไฟบ้านหนองตาด	366.50	3	?	Mueang Buriram District	
6.	2236	Buriram railway station	สถานีรถไฟบุรีรัมย์	376.02	1	?	Mueang Buriram District	
7.	2237	Ban Tako Halt railway station	สถานีรถไฟบ้านตะโก	380.35	Halt	?	Huai Rat District	
8.	2239	Huai Rat railway station	สถานีรถไฟห้วยราช	385.51	2	?	Huai Rat District	
9.	2243	Krasang railway station	สถานีรถไฟกระสัง	398.65	2	?	Krasang District	
10.	2244	Nong Teng railway station	สถานีรถไฟหนองเต็ง	405.50	3	?	Krasang District	
