= Ban Hin Khon railway station =

Railway station in Hin Khon, Thailand

Ban Hin Khon บ้านหินโคน

General information
- Location: Hin Khon Subdistrict, Chakkarat District; Nakhon Ratchasima Province; Thailand
- Coordinates: 15°00′13″N 102°29′57″E
- Operator: State Railway of Thailand
- Manager: Ministry of Transport
- Line: Ubon Ratchathani Main Line
- Platforms: 1
- Tracks: 2

Construction
- Structure type: At-grade

Other information
- Station code: หโ.
- Classification: Class 3

Services
Preceding station	State Railway of Thailand	Following station
Chakkarat towards Hua Lamphong or Krung Thep Aphiwat	Northeastern Line	Hin Dat towards Ubon Ratchathani
Location

Ban Hin Khon station (Thai: สถานีบ้านหินโคน) is a railway station located in Hin Khon Subdistrict, Chakkarat District, Nakhon Ratchasima Province. It is a class 3 railway station located 309.75 km (192.5 mi) from Bangkok railway station.
