= Huai Thalaeng railway station =

Railway station in Huai Thalaeng, Thailand

Huai Thalaeng ห้วยแถลง

General information
- Location: Huai Thalaeng Subdistrict, Huai Thalaeng District; Nakhon Ratchasima Province; Thailand
- Coordinates: 14°59′58″N 102°38′48″E
- Operator: State Railway of Thailand
- Manager: Ministry of Transport
- Line: Ubon Ratchathani Main Line
- Platforms: 1
- Tracks: 3

Construction
- Structure type: At-grade

Other information
- Station code: ถล.
- Classification: Class 2

Services
Preceding station	State Railway of Thailand	Following station
Hin Dat towards Hua Lamphong or Krung Thep Aphiwat	Northeastern Line	Nong Krathing towards Ubon Ratchathani
Location

Huai Thalaeng railway station is a railway station located in Huai Thalaeng Subdistrict, Huai Thalaeng District, Nakhon Ratchasima Province. It is a class 2 railway station located 335.65 km (208.6 mi) from Bangkok railway station and is the main station for Huai Thalaeng District.
