= Ban Pa Yang =

Village in Nakhon Ratchasima province, Thailand

Ban Pa Yang Thai: บ้านป่ายาง
- Village
- Interactive map of Ban Pa Yang
- Location in Thailand
- Coordinates: 15°17′12″N 102°34′40″E
- Country: Thailand
- Province: Nakhon Ratchasima
- District: Phimai
- Subdistrict: Tha Luang

Population (2021)
  - Total: 322
  - Registered houses: 87
- Time zone: UTC+7 (ICT)
- Village number: Mu 9

Ban Pa Yang (Thai: บ้านป่ายาง) is a village in Tha Luang subdistrict, Phimai District, Nakhon Ratchasima province, in northeastern Thailand. It is one of the subdistrict's twelve villages. Tha Luang lies about 6 km east of the town of Phimai and is mostly floodplain of the Mun River. An archaeological site 400 m east of the village has been dated on surface pottery to the 12th and 13th centuries.

== Geography ==
The Mun runs through the middle of the subdistrict. The soil is a sandy loam enriched by river alluvium, and almost all farmland is paddy, often carrying a second crop after the rice harvest. The river holds water through the dry season and breeds the fish that are a local staple. It also floods fields and houses every year, most heavily from August to October. The subdistrict administration has built an embankment along the river, but it is not yet continuous and protects only part of the area. Most households in the subdistrict grow rice, and fishing supplements farming during the floods.

== History ==
The site lies 400 m east of the village, on ground 148 m above sea level. The Mun lies 1.4 km to the north and the Lam Nam Khem 1.7 km to the south. A low mound about 200 m across once stood there. It has been levelled for paddy and none of its original form survives. Pottery and stone tools now lie thick on the surface across about 100 m.

The material is dominated by brown-glazed stoneware from the Ban Kruat kilns in Buriram province, dated to the 16th to 18th Buddhist centuries, or 958 to 1257 CE. Green-glazed wares were found with it, along with sandstone grinding slabs and their stones, thought to have been used for medicine. A lid of white-glazed porcelain assigned to the Southern Song of 1127 to 1279 has been taken as evidence of contact beyond the region. On this evidence, the site has been read as a settlement of the 18th Buddhist century, 1158 to 1257 CE. The dating rests on surface finds alone.

Brown-glazed Ban Kruat ware of the same date occurs at the ancient town of Phimai about 12 km to the southwest and at two further sites in the neighbouring subdistricts. The four have been treated as contemporaneous on that basis. A second mound, Non Sakae, lies about 1.4 km southeast of the village and stands 2 m above the surrounding fields. It has yielded Ban Kruat ware of the same centuries, together with a piece of metal slag.

== Administration and services ==
Ban Pa Yang is designated Mu 9 of Tha Luang subdistrict, whose twelve villages are also its electoral divisions. The Chan Tamra subdistrict health-promoting hospital serves Ban Pa Yang and four other villages. The subdistrict has four schools; the only one teaching to lower-secondary level is in the adjacent village of Ban Chan Tamra (บ้านจารย์ตำรา).
