= Tha Chang railway station (Nakhon Ratchasima) =

Railway station in Tha Chang, Thailand

Tha Chang ท่าช้าง

General information
- Location: Tha Chang Subdistrict, Chaloem Phra Kiat District; Nakhon Ratchasima Province; Thailand
- Coordinates: 15°00′07″N 102°16′28″E
- Operator: State Railway of Thailand
- Manager: Ministry of Transport
- Line: Ubon Ratchathani Main Line
- Platforms: 1
- Tracks: 2

Construction
- Structure type: At-grade

Other information
- Station code: ชา.
- Classification: Class 3

Services
Preceding station	State Railway of Thailand	Following station
Ban Phra Phut Halt towards Hua Lamphong or Krung Thep Aphiwat	Northeastern Line	Nong Manorom towards Ubon Ratchathani
Location

Tha Chang railway station is a railway station located in Tha Chang Subdistrict, Chaloem Phra Kiat District, Nakhon Ratchasima Province. It is a class 3 railway station located 285.40 km (177.3 mi) from Bangkok railway station and is the main station for Chaloem Phra Kiat District.
