= Chakkarat railway station =

Railway station in Thailand

Chakkarat จักราช

General information
- Location: Chakkarat Subdistrict, Chakkarat District; Nakhon Ratchasima Province; Thailand
- Coordinates: 15°00′46″N 102°24′38″E
- Operator: State Railway of Thailand
- Manager: Ministry of Transport
- Line: Ubon Ratchathani Main Line
- Platforms: 1
- Tracks: 3

Construction
- Structure type: At-grade

Other information
- Station code: จช.
- Classification: Class 2

Services
Preceding station	State Railway of Thailand	Following station
Nong Manorom towards Hua Lamphong or Krung Thep Aphiwat	Northeastern Line	Ban Hin Khon towards Ubon Ratchathani
Location

Chakkarat station (Thai: สถานีจักราช) is a railway station located in Chakkarat Subdistrict, Chakkarat District, Nakhon Ratchasima Province. It is a class 2 railway station located 300.15 km (186.5 mi) from Bangkok railway station and is the main station for Chakkarat District.
