= VGO =

VGO may refer to:

- Vacuum gas oil, heavy oils left over from petroleum distillation that can be further refined in a catalytic cracking unit
- Vgo (stonemason)
- Vickers Gas Operated machine gun, a service name for the Vickers K machine gun
- Video Game Orchestra, a video game music arrangement group based in Boston
- Vigo-Peinador Airport (IATA: VGO), Province of Pontevedra, Spain
- VGo, a robotic telepresence device owned by Vecna Technologies
- A series of very large bomber aircraft produced by Gothaer Waggonfabrik; see Zeppelin-Staaken V.G.O.I
- New Gen Airways (ICAO: VGO), Bangkok, Thailand
