= Chum Phuang district =

Province district in northeastern Thailand

Chum Phuang ชุมพวง
- District
- District location in Nakhon Ratchasima province
- Coordinates: 15°20′56″N 102°44′31″E
- Country: Thailand
- Province: Nakhon Ratchasima
- Seat: Chum Phuang

Area
  - Total: 540.6 km^{2} (208.7 sq mi)

Population (2000)
  - Total: 81,440
  - Density: 150.7/km^{2} (390/sq mi)
- Time zone: UTC+7 (ICT)
- Postal code: 30270
- Geocode: 3017

Chum Phuang (Thai: ชุมพวง, pronounced [tɕʰūm pʰūaŋ]; Northeastern Thai: ซุมพวง, pronounced [su᷇m pʰu᷇aŋ])) is a district in the eastern part of Nakhon Ratchasima province, northeastern Thailand.

== History ==
Chum Phuang district was separated from Phimai district. It was made a minor district (king amphoe) in 1956 and upgraded to a full district in 1959.

== Geography ==
Neighbouring districts are (from the north clockwise): Prathai, Mueang Yang and Lam Thamenchai of Nakhon Ratchasima Province; Lam Plai Mat of Buriram province; and Huai Thalaeng and Phimai of Nakhon Ratchasima.

The district is the site of the Huay Bong Reservoir. The 25 million cubic metre capacity reservoir supplies water for the 800 households of Prasuk Subdistrict.

== Administration ==
The district is divided into nine sub-districts (tambons). Chum Phuang is the only township (thesaban tambon) of the district, covering parts of the tambon Chum Phuang. There are a further nine tambon administrative organizations (TAO).

1.	Chum Phuang	ชุมพวง
2.	Prasuk	ประสุข
3.	Tha Lat	ท่าลาด
4.	Sarai	สาหร่าย
5.	Talat Sai	ตลาดไทร
10.	Non Rang	โนนรัง
14.	Nong Lak	หนองหลัก
16.	Non Tum	โนนตูม
17.	Non Yo	โนนยอ

Missing numbers are tambons which now form the districts Mueang Yang and Lam Thamenchai.
