= Hin Dat railway station =

Rail station in northeastern Thailand

Hin Dat หินดาษ

General information
- Location: Hin Dat Subdistrict, Huai Thalaeng District; Nakhon Ratchasima Province; Thailand
- Coordinates: 15°00′10″N 102°33′56″E
- Operator: State Railway of Thailand
- Manager: Ministry of Transport
- Line: Ubon Ratchathani Main Line
- Platforms: 1
- Tracks: 3

Construction
- Structure type: At-grade

Other information
- Station code: ดา.
- Classification: Class 3

Services
Preceding station	State Railway of Thailand	Following station
Ban Hin Khon towards Hua Lamphong or Krung Thep Aphiwat	Northeastern Line	Huai Thalaeng towards Ubon Ratchathani
Location

Hin Dat railway station is a railway station located in Hin Dat Subdistrict, Huai Thalaeng District, Nakhon Ratchasima Province. It is a class 3 railway station located 316.90 km (196.9 mi) from Bangkok railway station.
