= Nong Manorom railway station =

Railway station in Thailand

Nong Manorom หนองมโนรมย์
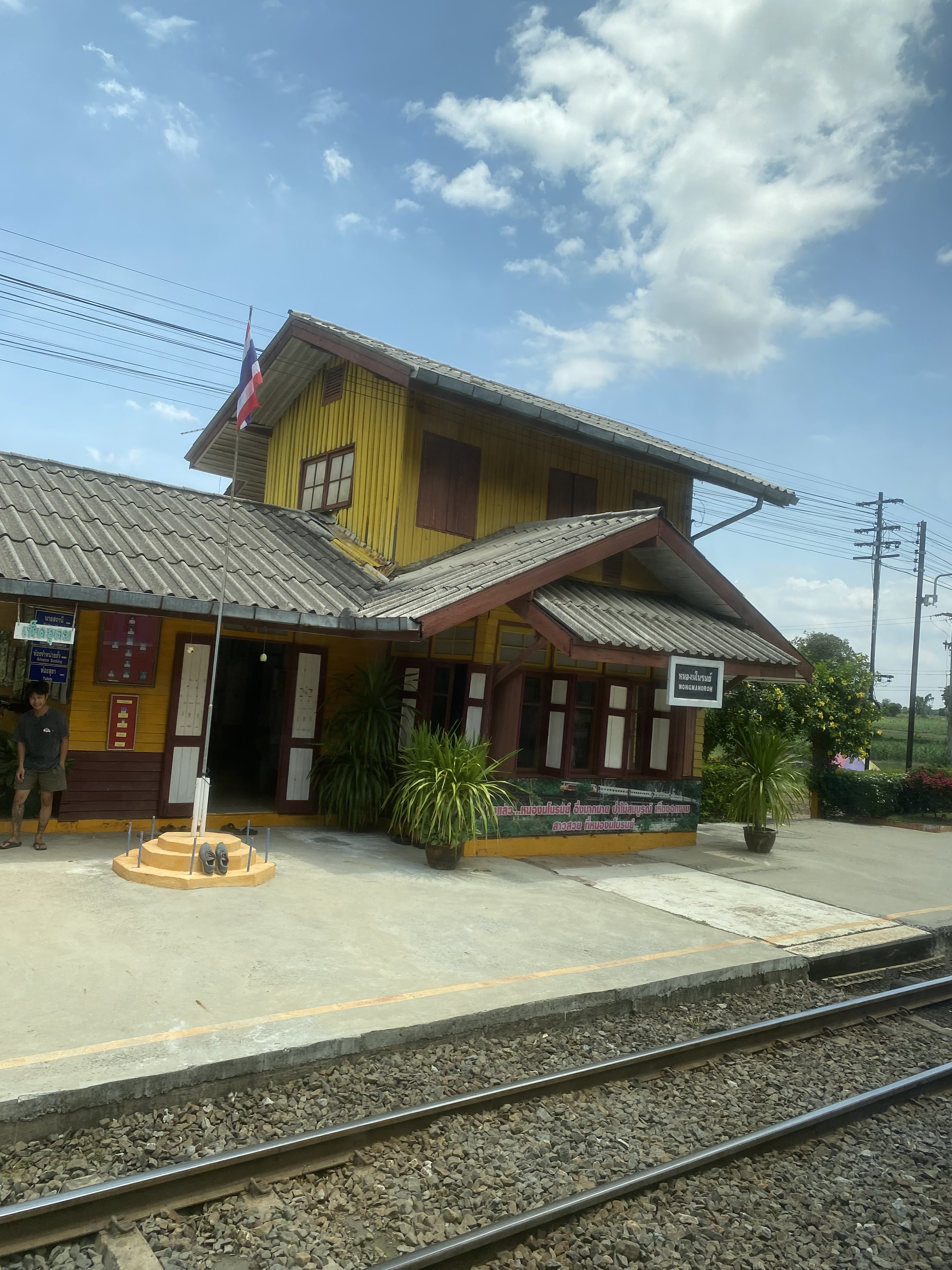

General information
- Location: Thong Lang Subdistrict, Chakkarat District; Nakhon Ratchasima Province; Thailand
- Coordinates: 15°00′48″N 102°20′48″E
- Operator: State Railway of Thailand
- Manager: Ministry of Transport
- Line: Ubon Ratchathani Main Line
- Platforms: 1
- Tracks: 3

Construction
- Structure type: At-grade

Other information
- Station code: มโ.
- Classification: Class 3

Services
Preceding station	State Railway of Thailand	Following station
Tha Chang towards Hua Lamphong or Krung Thep Aphiwat	Northeastern Line	Chakkarat towards Ubon Ratchathani
Location

Nong Manorom railway station is a railway station located in Thong Lang Subdistrict, Chakkarat District, Nakhon Ratchasima Province. It is a class 3 railway station located 293.26 km (182.2 mi) from Bangkok railway station.
