= Khao Kradong Railway =

Railway line in Buriram, Thailand

Khao Kradong Railway is a brief railway line in the town of Buriram. It runs from Buriram Railway Station to the rock mine which is next to New I-Mobile Stadium.

There are only freight trains run on the lines, once or twice a year. Latest trains enter into the line in January 2014.

== See also ==
- Buriram Railway Station
- Ubon Ratchathani Main Line
