= Lam Thamenchai district =

Lam Thamenchai ลำทะเมนชัย
- District
- District location in Nakhon Ratchasima province
- Coordinates: 15°21′12″N 102°55′6″E
- Country: Thailand
- Province: Nakhon Ratchasima
- Seat: Khui

Area
  - Total: 308.5 km^{2} (119.1 sq mi)

Population (2021)
  - Total: 32,704
  - Density: 104.4/km^{2} (270/sq mi)
- Time zone: UTC+7 (ICT)
- Postal code: 30270
- Geocode: 3029

Lam Thamenchai (Thai: ลำทะเมนชัย, pronounced [lām tʰā.mēːn.tɕʰāj]; Northeastern Thai: ลำทะเมนชัย, pronounced [lâm tʰā.mêːn.sâj]) is a district (amphoe) of Nakhon Ratchasima province, northeastern Thailand.

== History ==
The area of Lam Thamenchai was separated from Chum Phuang district and made a minor district (king amphoe) on 15 July 1996.

On 15 May 2007, all 81 minor districts were upgraded to full districts. On 24 August the upgrade became official.

== Geography ==
Neighboring districts are (from the east clockwise): Khu Mueang and Lam Plai Mat of Buriram province; Chum Phuang and Mueang Yang of Nakhon Ratchasima Province.

The district is named after the Thamenchai River, the main river of the district.

== Administration ==
The district is divided into four subdistricts (tambons). The township (thesaban tambon) of Nong Bua Wong covers parts of the tambons Kui and Phlai.

1.	Khui	ขุย
2.	Ban Yang	บ้านยาง
3.	Chong Maeo	ช่องแมว
4.	Phlai	ไพล
