= New Gen Airways =

Airline of Thailand (2012–2019)

New Gen Airways บริษัท นิวเจน แอร์เวย์ส จำกัด
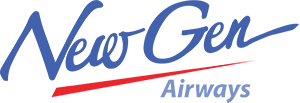
IATA	ICAO	Call sign
E3	VGO	VIRGO
- Founded: July 2012 (as Sabaidee Airways)
- Ceased operations: October 2019
- Operating bases: Bangkok–Don Mueang; Krabi; Nakhon Ratchasima; Pattaya/U-Tapao; Phuket; Surat Thani
- Headquarters: Don Mueang, Bangkok, Thailand
- Key people: Mr. Jarurnpong Sornprasit (CEO)

A former office of New Gen Airways in Don Mueang International Airport, Bangkok in 2026

New Gen Airways, legally NewGen Airways Company Limited (Thai: บริษัท นิวเจน แอร์เวย์ส จำกัด) (formerly Sabaidee Airways Company Limited (Thai: บริษัท สบายดีแอร์เวย์ส จำกัด)), was an airline of Thailand that concentrated on flights from Thailand to China. It operated both scheduled- and non-scheduled (charter) services from 6 main Thailand bases, Bangkok's Don Mueang International Airport, U-Tapao International Airport, Krabi International Airport, Phuket International Airport, Surat Thani International Airport and Nakhon Ratchasima Airport in the southern cities of Krabi, Phuket and Surat Thani, to a total of 30 destinations in China and 1 destination in Japan.

In August 2019, New Gen Airways suspended all flight operations. In October of the same year, the airline forfeited its whole fleet, thus ceasing all operations.

== History ==
The airline received an air operator's certificate in January 2014.

== Destinations ==
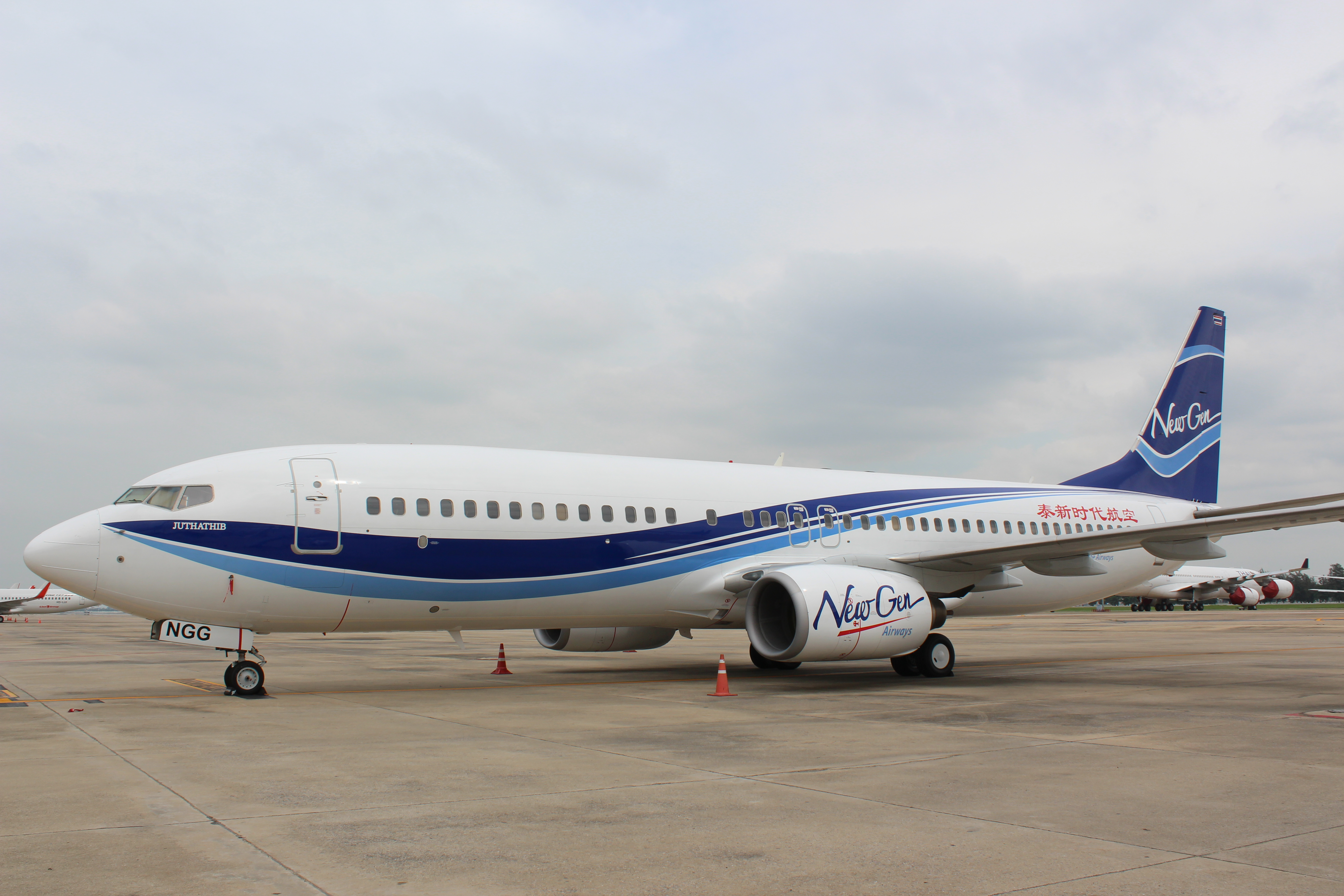
New Gen Airways Boeing 737-800 at Don Mueang International Airport.

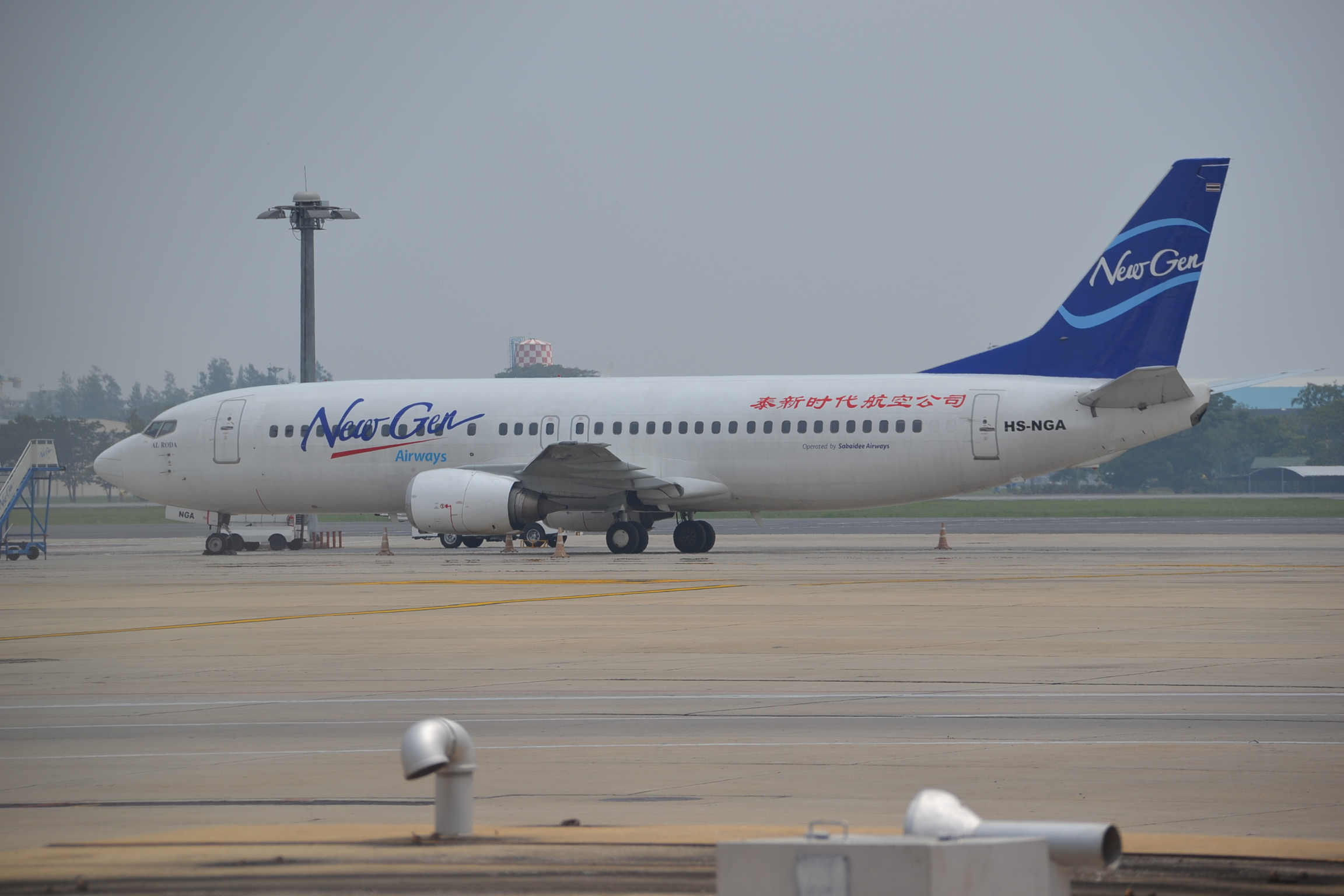
New Gen Airways Boeing 737-400, Don Mueang International Airport.

From Bangkok – Don Mueang International Airport (Primary Base)

- Changsha – Changsha Huanghua International Airport
- Fuzhou – Fuzhou Changle International Airport
- Guilin – Guilin Liangjiang International Airport
- Guiyang – Guiyang Longdongbao International Airport
- Hiroshima – Hiroshima Airport
- Hefei – Hefei Xinqiao International Airport
- Huai'an – Huaian Lianshui International Airport
- Huangshan – Huangshan Tunxi International Airport
- Jinan – Jinan Yaoqiang International Airport
- Jinjiang – Quanzhou Jinjiang International Airport
- Nanchang – Nanchang Changbei International Airport
- Nanning – Nanning Wuxu International Airport
- Ningbo – Ningbo Lishe International Airport
- Wenzhou – Wenzhou Longwan International Airport
- Wuxi – Sunan Shuofang International Airport
- Xuzhou – Xuzhou Guanyin International Airport
- Zhangjiajie – Zhangjiajie Hehua International Airport
- Yiwu – Yiwu Airport

From Chiang Mai – Chiang Mai International Airport

- Ningbo – Ningbo Lishe International Airport
- Wenzhou – Wenzhou Longwan International Airport

From Krabi – Krabi International Airport (Base)

- Jinan – Jinan Yaoqiang International Airport
- Tianjin – Tianjin Binhai International Airport
- Wuhan – Wuhan Tianhe International Airport
- Changsha – Changsha Huanghua International Airport
- Nanning – Nanning Wuxu International Airport

From Phuket – Phuket International Airport (Base)

- Baotou – Baotou Donghe Airport
- Guiyang – Guiyang Longdongbao International Airport
- Hangzhou – Hangzhou Xiaoshan International Airport
- Wuxi – Sunan Shuofang International Airport
- Hohhot – Hohhot Baita International Airport

From Pattaya – U-Tapao International Airport (Base)

- Zhengzhou – Zhengzhou Xinzheng International Airport

=== Domestic Destinations ===
From Nakhon Ratchasima – Nakhon Ratchasima Airport (Base)

- Chiang Mai – Chiang Mai International Airport
- Phuket – Phuket International Airport
- Bangkok – Don Mueang International Airport

=== Former Destinations ===
- Kunming – Kunming Wujiaba International Airport
- Nanjing – Nanjing Lukou International Airport
- Qingdao – Qingdao Liuting International Airport

== Fleet ==
During its seven-year existence, New Gen Airways had operated the following aircraft

New Gen Airways fleet
Aircraft	In service	Orders	Passengers (Economy)
Boeing 737-400	3	—	168
Boeing 737-800	8	2	189
Total	11	—	
