= Lam Plai Mat railway station =

Railway station in Thailand

Lam Plai Mat ลำปลายมาศ
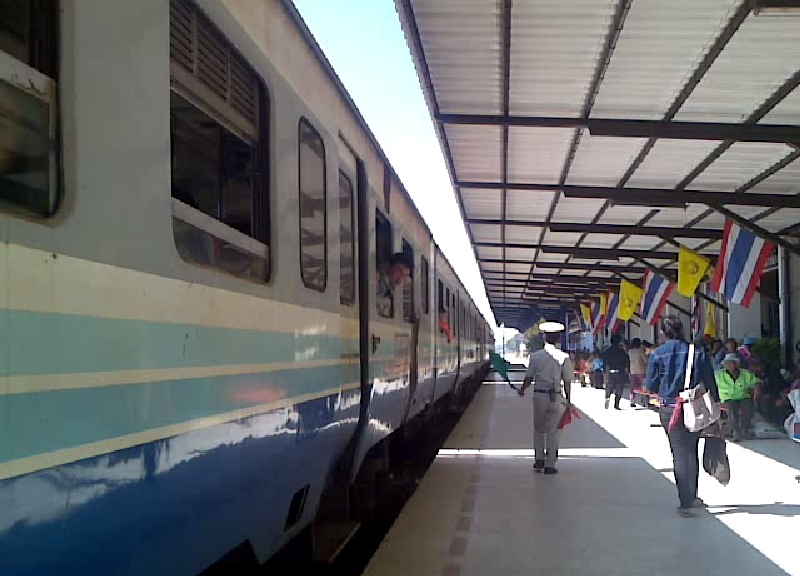
- Lam Plai Mat station in 2013

General information
- Location: Lam Plai Mat Subdistrict, Lam Plai Mat District; Buriram Province; Thailand
- Coordinates: 15°01′29″N 102°49′47″E
- Operator: State Railway of Thailand
- Manager: Ministry of Transport
- Line: Ubon Ratchathani Main Line
- Platforms: 2
- Tracks: 3

Construction
- Structure type: At-grade

Other information
- Station code: ลำ.
- Classification: Class 1

Services
Preceding station	State Railway of Thailand	Following station
Nong Krathing towards Hua Lamphong or Krung Thep Aphiwat	Northeastern Line	Thamen Chai towards Ubon Ratchathani
Location

Lam Plai Mat railway station is a railway station located in Lam Plai Mat Subdistrict, Lam Plai Mat District, Buriram Province. It is a class 1 railway station located 345.70 km (214.8 mi) from Bangkok railway station and is the main station for Lam Plai Mat District.
