= Tha Chang, Nakhon Ratchasima =

Tha Chang ท่าช้าง
- Tambon
- Etymology: Elephant pier
- Interactive map of Tha Chang
- Coordinates: 15°0′20.48″N 102°16′18.22″E
- Country: Thailand
- Province: Nakhon Ratchasima
- District: Chaloem Phra Kiat
- Named for: Elephant

Area
  - Total: 106 km^{2} (41 sq mi)

Population (December 2021)
  - Total: 8,168
  - Density: 77.1/km^{2} (200/sq mi)
- Time zone: UTC+7 (ICT)
- Postcode: 30230
- Area code: (+66) 02
- Geocode: 303202

Tha Chang (Thai: ท่าช้าง, pronounced [tʰâː t͡ɕʰáːŋ]) is a tambon (subdistrict) in Chaloem Phra Kiat district, Nakhon Ratchasima province, Thailand.

== Toponymy ==
The name Tha Chang literally translated as "elephant pier". Legendarily a herd of elephants comes down to drink water at the Mun river that runs through the area. Hence the name.

== Geography ==
Tha Chang is part of Khorat Geopark, a plot of land at Lam Takhong river, part of cuesta (known locally as Khao-Meed-I-To). Fossils, especially primitive elephants were found, so it is an important international geopark. Khorat Geopark covers five districts of Nakhon Ratchasima, Sikhio, Sung Noen, Kham Thale So, Mueang Nakhon Ratchasima and Chaloem Phra Kiat. UNESCO certified it as the 2nd UNESCO Global Geoparks of Thailand and is the 4th place in the world in May 2023.

Fossils of 10 genera out of 55 genera of elephant ever discovered on earth were found here. Four-tusked elephant, shovel tusker and stegodon are part of them. In addition, some extinct mammals have also been discovered here, such as Merycopotamus thachangensis. It was named to honour the subdistrict.

Lam Takhong and Mun rivers are the lifeblood of the locals.

Tha Chang is about 285 km (177.1 mi) northeast of Bangkok.

Adjacent subdistricts are (from north clockwise): Nong Ngu Lueam in its district, Lam Mun in Non Sung district, Chang Thong in its district, Si Lako in Chakkarat district, Nong Yang in its district, Si Suk in Chakkarat district, and Phra Phut in its district.

== Administration ==
Tha Chang is regarded as the centre of Chaloem Phra Kiat district.

The subdistrict is governed by two local government bodies, Tha Chang Municipality and Tha Chang Subdistrict Administrative Organization.

The emblem of Tha Chang Subdistrict Municipality is a three-headed white elephant, also known as airavata.

Tha Chang also consists of 16 administrative muban (villages).

No.	Name	Thai
1.	Ban Kham	บ้านขาม
2.	Ban Non Liap	บ้านโนนเลียบ
3.	Ban Nong Hoi	บ้านหนองหอย
4.	Ban Sam Kwai	บ้านสามแคว
5.	Ban Nong Bua Ri	บ้านหนองบัวรี
6.	Ban Dan Tha Daeng	บ้านด่านท่าแดง
7.	Ban Non Sadao	บ้านโนนสะเดา
8.	Ban Takut Khon	บ้านตะกุดขอน
9.	Ban Chong Ko	บ้านช่องโค
10.	Ban Ma Dan	บ้านมะดัน
11.	Ban Nong Bua	บ้านหนองบัว
12.	Ban Mai	บ้านใหม่
13.	Ban Tha Chang	บ้านท่าช้าง
14.	Ban Talat Tha Chang	บ้านตลาดท่าช้าง
15.	Ban Pi Man	บ้านพิมาน
16.	Ban Non Mai Daeng Nuea	บ้านโนนไม้แดงเหนือ

== Population ==
At the end of 2021, it had a total population of 8,168 in 3,014 households.

== Transportation ==
Tha Chang is served by the Tha Chang railway station of the State Railway of Thailand (SRT), whose Northeastern Line runs through the area.

== Places ==
- Fossil Proboscidean Museum
- Yang Dam
- Railway Bridge Memorial
- Sai Ngam

== Local products ==
- Kai yang (Thai grilled chicken)
- Hand woven cotton fabric
- Papyrus mat
