= Nong Krathing railway station =

Railway station in Thailand

Nong Krathing หนองกระทิง

General information
- Location: Kong Rot Subdistrict, Huai Thalaeng District; Nakhon Ratchasima Province; Thailand
- Coordinates: 15°00′22″N 102°45′21″E
- Operator: State Railway of Thailand
- Manager: Ministry of Transport
- Line: Ubon Ratchathani Main Line
- Platforms: 1
- Tracks: 2

Construction
- Structure type: At-grade

Other information
- Station code: ทง.
- Classification: Class 3

Services
Preceding station	State Railway of Thailand	Following station
Huai Thalaeng towards Hua Lamphong or Krung Thep Aphiwat	Northeastern Line	Lam Plai Mat towards Ubon Ratchathani
Location

Nong Krathing railway station is a railway station located in Kong Rot Subdistrict, Huai Thalaeng District, Nakhon Ratchasima Province. It is a class 3 railway station located 337.50 km (209.7 mi) from Bangkok railway station.
