= Nong Bunnak =

Nong Bunnak หนองบุนนาก
- Subdistrict Administrative Organization
- Interactive map of Nong Bunnak
- Coordinates: 14.6953°N 102.4513°E
- Country: Thailand
- Province: Nakhon Ratchasima
- District: Nong Bun Mak

Government
  - Mayor: Yongyuth Yodyingyong
  - Deputy Mayor: Tiang Manmethe

Area
  - Total: 101.29 km^{2} (39.11 sq mi)

Population (2019)
  - Total: 10,626
  - Density: 100/km^{2} (260/sq mi)
- Time zone: UTC+7 (ICT)
- Postcode: 30410
- Area code: (+66) 02
- Geocode: 302201

Nong Bunnak (Thai: หนองบุนนาก, pronounced [nɔ̌ːŋ būn nâːk]) is a tambon (sub-district) of Nong Bun Mak District, Nakhon Ratchasima Province, northeastern Thailand.

== History ==
Originally, Nong Bun Mak was a sub-district belonging to Chok Chai District in the name of "Saraphi". On July 1, 1983, the Ministry of Interior was established Saraphi Sub-district into a minor-district named "King Amphoe Nong Bun Mak".

Nong Bun Mak District is divided into nine administrative sub-districts, Nong Bunnak is also one of them.

The literal translation of Nong Bunnak is 'Ceylon ironwood [Bunnak] marsh [Nong]', as its area in the past, there were many this species of plants around the marsh.

== Geography ==
Nong Bunnak is approximately 70 km (43.5 mi) southeast of Nakhon Ratchasima (Khorat) and 290 km (180.2 mi) northeast of Bangkok.

Adjacent sub-districts are (from the north clockwise): Thai Charoen in its district, Bu Krasang in Nong Ki District of Buriram Province, Suk Phaibun in Soeng Sang District, and Nong Takai in its district.

== Administration ==
=== Central administration ===
The entire area is administered by the Subdistrict Administrative Organization (SAO) Nong Bunnak (อบต.หนองบุนนาก).

=== Local administration ===
Nong Bunnak also consists of 17 administrative muban (village)

Name	Thai
Ban Nong Bunnak	บ้านหนองบุนนาก
Ban Khok Phluang	บ้านโคกพลวง
Ban Sa Khla	บ้านสระคล้า
Ban Hua Thamnop	บ้านหัวทำนบ
Ban Plak Khoi	บ้านปลักข่อย
Ban Nong Bunnak	บ้านหนองบุนนาก
Ban Nong Yai Tiam	บ้านหนองยายเทียม
Ban Nong Sai	บ้านหนองไทร
Ban Yup Yai	บ้านยุบใหญ่
Ban Sawang Phatthana	บ้านสว่างพัฒนา
Ban Sub Takhro	บ้านซับตะคร้อ
Ban Rungrueng	บ้านรุ่งเรือง
Ban Nong Wa	บ้านหนองหว้า
Ban Saen Suk	บ้านแสนสุข
Ban Khasem Suk	บ้านเกษมสุข
Ban Nong Chan Phatthana	บ้านหนองจานพัฒนา
Ban Nong Rang Ka	บ้านหนองรังกา

== Public utilities ==
Most of the people in Nong Bunnak are Buddhists with 10 places of worship, consists of six Buddhist temples and four houses of monk.

There are two health promotion hospitals in the area.

Nong Bunnak has three child development centres, one primary school, three junior secondary schools.
