= Prasat Ban Thanon Hak =

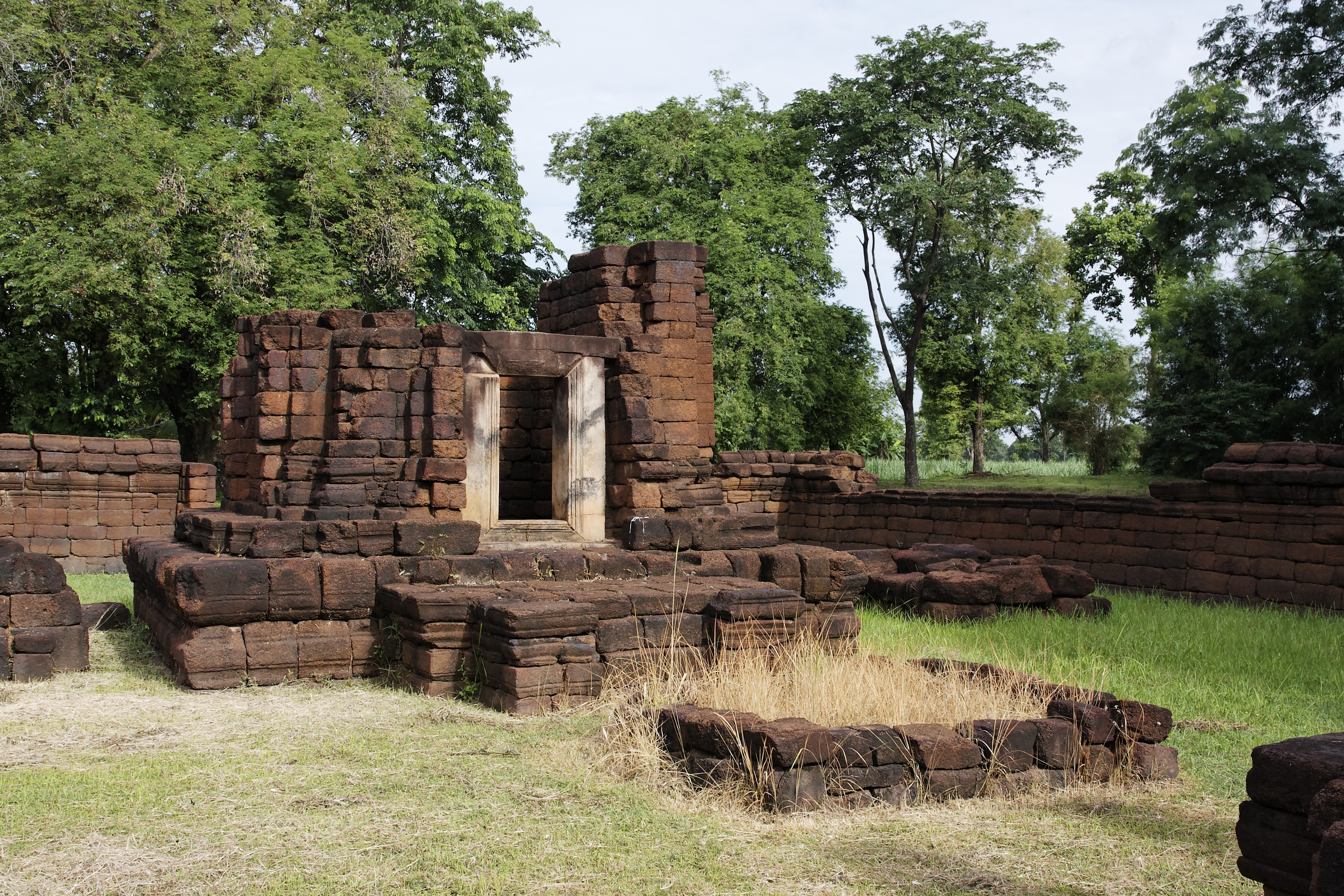

- Location in Thailand

Religion
- Affiliation: Hinduism
- District: Nong Bun Mak
- Province: Nakhon Ratchasima
- Deity: Vishnu

Location
- Location: Ban Thanon Hak, Ban Mai Subdistrict
- Country: Thailand
- Coordinates: 14.748333°N 102.418333°E

Architecture
- Type: Khmer
- Completed: 11th century

Prasat Ban Thanon Hak (Thai: ปราสาทบ้านถนนหัก, pronounced [prāː.sàːt bâːn tʰā.nǒn hàk]) otherwise known as Prasat Thanon Hak (ปราสาทถนนหัก, pronounced [prāː.sàːt tʰā.nǒn hàk]) is a small ruined building located in Ban Thanon Hak, Ban Mai Subdistrict, Nong Bun Mak District, Nakhon Ratchasima Province.

It is a Khmer Hindu temple built in the 11th century. The temple measures approximately 4 m (13.1 ft), 80 m (262.5 ft) long and 20 m (65.6 ft) thick. It faces east and comprises five structures encircled by a wall and baray (moat). At the east wall is the gopura (entrance arch) is the same as the exit on the other side. The lintels and sculptured stone slabs are made of sandstone and bronze, with dark brown-black Khmer lacquerware.

The temple is believed was built to perform rituals in Vaishnavism sect of Brahmanism or Hinduism.

Its location is a rectangular ditch-like path and there is a mound in the centre called Non Yai Chi (Thai: โนนยายชี, pronounced [nōːn jāːj t͡ɕʰīː]). The path is about 500 m (1,640.4 ft) wide and about 2 km (1.2 mi) long, it was eroded by water until there were many torn marks. Hence the name "Thanon Hak" (Thai: ถนนหัก, directly translates as "broken path").

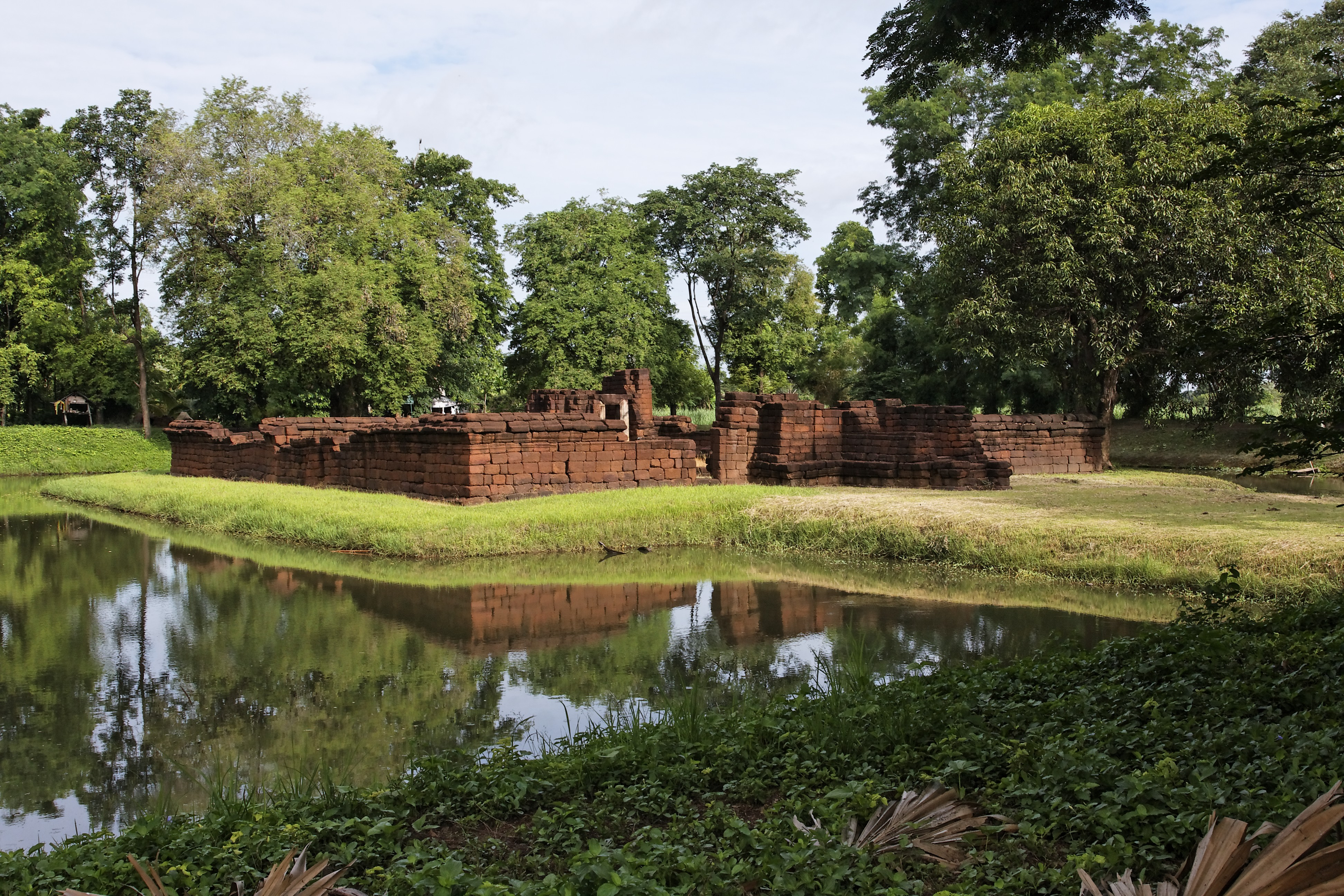
The temple and baray

The temple is about 4 km (2.5 mi) from Highway 24 (Chok Chai–Det Udom Route) and about 60 km (37.3 mi) southeast of Nakhon Ratchasima City.

Laterite is the main material used for the construction. Gold ornaments, bronze and stone statues as well as brown glazed ceramics were unearthed. In 2017, a gold ring set with a translucent blue quartz in perfect condition aged around the early 11th century, was also discovered here.
