= Nong Hong district =

Nong Hong หนองหงส์
- District
- District location in Buriram province
- Coordinates: 14°51′0″N 102°41′18″E
- Country: Thailand
- Province: Buriram
- Seat: Sa Kaeo

Area
  - Total: 335.0 km^{2} (129.3 sq mi)

Population (2005)
  - Total: 48,442
  - Density: 144.6/km^{2} (375/sq mi)
- Time zone: UTC+7 (ICT)
- Postal code: 31240
- Geocode: 3114

Nong Hong (Thai: หนองหงส์, pronounced [nɔ̌ːŋ hǒŋ]) is a district (amphoe) in the western part of Buriram province, northeastern Thailand.

== Geography ==
Neighboring districts are (from the northeast clockwise) Lam Plai Mat, Chamni, Nong Ki of Buriram Province, Chakkarat and Huai Thalaeng of Nakhon Ratchasima province.

== History ==
The minor district (king amphoe) was created on 31 March 1981, when the three tambons Sa Kaeo, Huai Hin, and Thai Samakkhi were split off from Lam Plai Mat district. It was upgraded to a full district on 1 January 1988.

== Motto ==
The Nong Hong District's motto is "The city of best beef, Shallots, Maeung Fai's ancient city, have many teal and excellent tradition."

== Administration ==
The district is divided into seven sub-districts (tambons), which are further subdivided into 100 villages (mubans). Nong Hong is a township (thesaban tambon) which covers parts of tambon Sa Kaeo. There are also seven tambon administrative organizations (TAO).

No.	Name	Thai name	Villages	Pop.
1.	Sa Kaeo	สระแก้ว	15	6,633
2.	Huai Hin	ห้วยหิน	19	9,573
3.	Thai Samakkhi	ไทยสามัคคี	15	8,885
4.	Nong Chai Si	หนองชัยศรี	15	6,079
5.	Sao Diao	เสาเดียว	15	6,616
6.	Mueang Fai	เมืองฝ้าย	12	7,031
7.	Sa Thong	สระทอง	9	3,625
