= Nakhon Ratchasima Airport =

Airport in northeastern Thailand

- IATA: NAK; ICAO: VTUQ

Summary
- Airport type: Public
- Operator: Department of Airports
- Serves: Nakhon Ratchasima
- Location: Tha Chang, Chaloem Phra Kiat, Nakhon Ratchasima, Thailand
- Opened: 5 December 1997; 28 years ago
- Elevation AMSL: 765 ft (233 m)
- Coordinates: 14°56′58″N 102°18′45″E

Maps
- Location of airport in Thailand
- Interactive map of Nakhon Ratchasima Airport

Runways
Direction	Length		Surface
Direction	ft	m	Surface
06/24	6,890	2,100	Asphalt

Nakhon Ratchasima Airport (IATA: NAK, ICAO: VTUQ), is in Tha Chang subdistrict, Chaloem Phra Kiat district, Nakhon Ratchasima province in northeastern Thailand, approximately 26 kilometers east of downtown Nakhon Ratchasima.

The airport is primarily used for flight training and general aviation.
