= Thamen Chai railway station =

Railway station in Thailand

Thamen Chai ทะเมนชัย
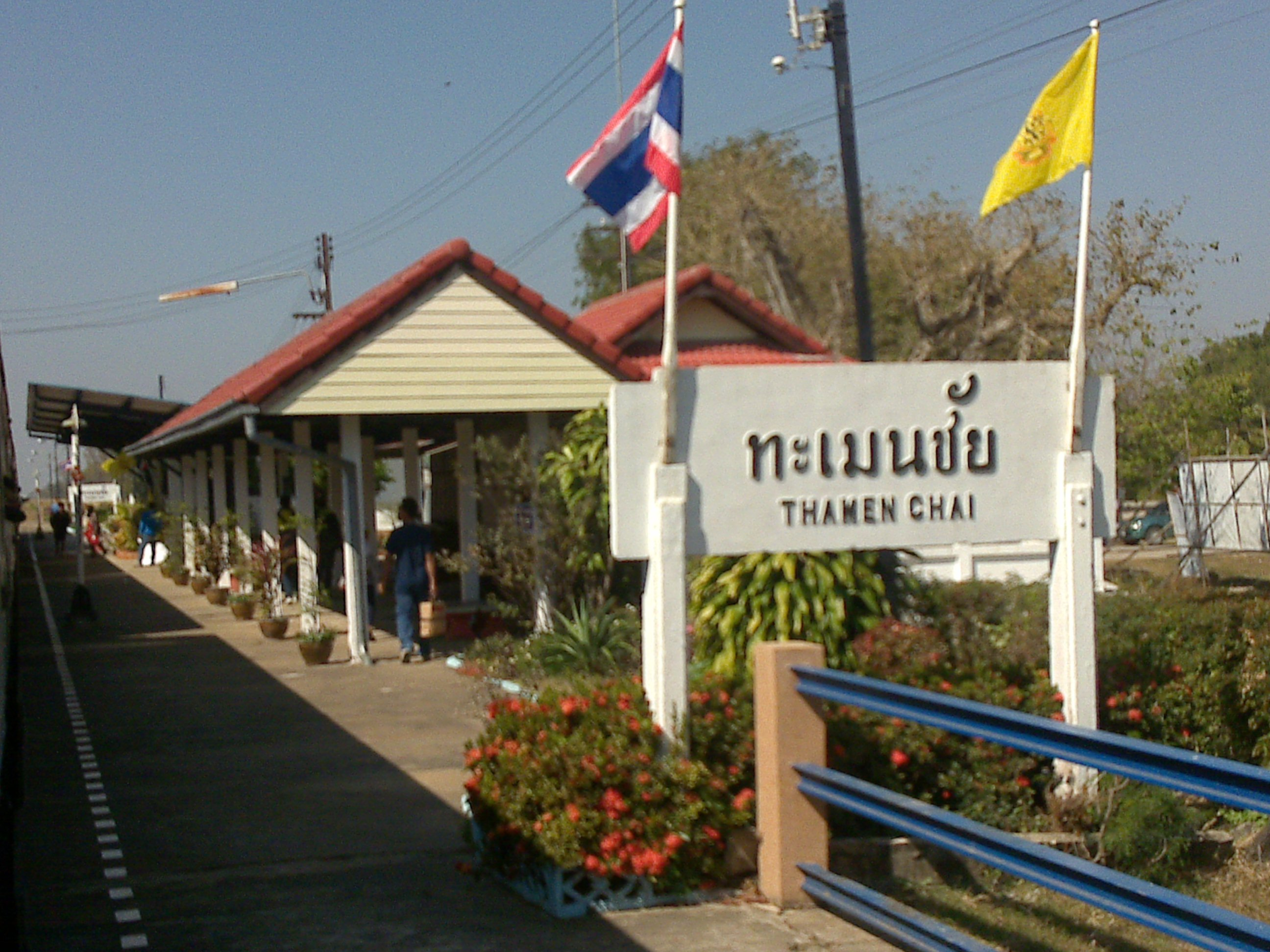
- Thamen Chai station in 2011

General information
- Location: Thamen Chai Subdistrict, Lam Plai Mat District; Buriram Province; Thailand
- Coordinates: 15°01′50″N 102°54′50″E
- Operator: State Railway of Thailand
- Manager: Ministry of Transport
- Line: Ubon Ratchathani Main Line
- Platforms: 1
- Tracks: 3

Construction
- Structure type: At-grade

Other information
- Station code: มช.
- Classification: Class 2

Services
Preceding station	State Railway of Thailand	Following station
Lam Plai Mat towards Hua Lamphong or Krung Thep Aphiwat	Northeastern Line	Ban Salaeng Phan towards Ubon Ratchathani
Location

Thamen Chai railway station is a railway station located in Thamen Chai Subdistrict, Lam Plai Mat District, Buriram Province. It is a class 2 railway station located 354.85 km (220.5 mi) from Bangkok railway station.
