= Ban Salaeng Phan railway station =

Railway station in Salaeng Phan, Thailand

Ban Salaeng Phan บ้านแสลงพัน
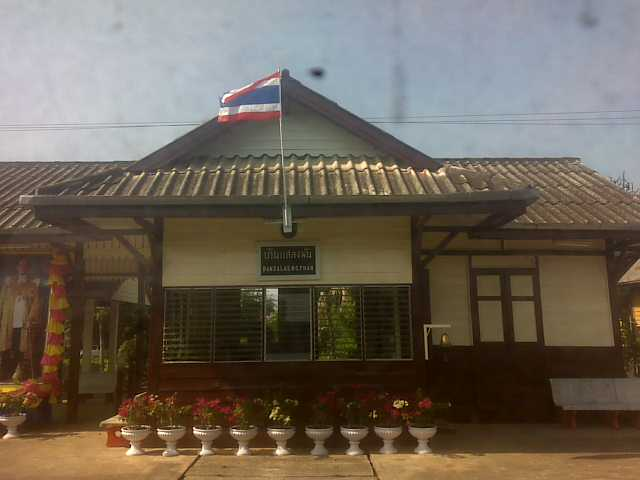

General information
- Location: Salaeng Phan Subdistrict, Lam Plai Mat District; Buriram Province; Thailand
- Coordinates: 15°01′36″N 102°59′31″E
- Operator: State Railway of Thailand
- Manager: Ministry of Transport
- Line: Ubon Ratchathani Main Line
- Platforms: 1
- Tracks: 2

Construction
- Structure type: At-grade

Other information
- Station code: งพ.
- Classification: Class 3

Services
Preceding station	State Railway of Thailand	Following station
Thamen Chai towards Hua Lamphong or Krung Thep Aphiwat	Northeastern Line	Ban Nong Tat towards Ubon Ratchathani
Location

Ban Salaeng Phan station (Thai: สถานีบ้านแสลงพัน) is a railway station located in Salaeng Phan Subdistrict, Lam Plai Mat District, Buriram Province. It is a class 3 railway station located 363.30 km (225.7 mi) from Bangkok railway station.
