= Nong Bun Mak district =

Nong Bun Mak หนองบุญมาก
- District
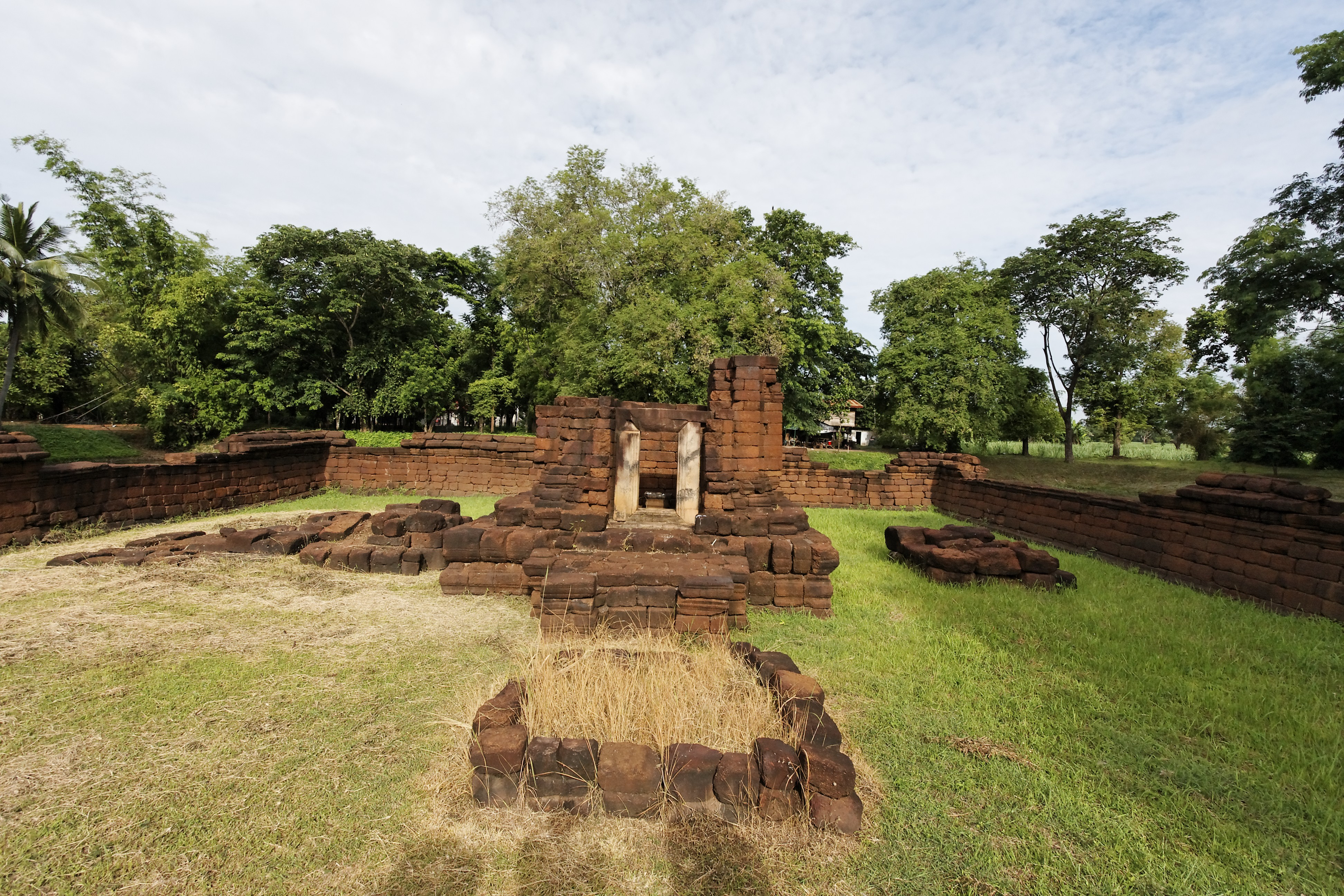
- Prasat Ban Thanon Hak, an ancient Hindu temple in the district

- District location in Nakhon Ratchasima province
- Coordinates: 14°44′23″N 102°21′57″E
- Country: Thailand
- Province: Nakhon Ratchasima
- Seat: Nong Hua Raet

Area
  - Total: 590.4 km^{2} (228.0 sq mi)

Population (2000)
  - Total: 56,287
- Time zone: UTC+7 (ICT)
- Postal code: 30410
- Geocode: 3022

Nong Bun Mak (Thai: หนองบุญมาก, pronounced [nɔ̌ːŋ būn mâːk]) is a district (amphoe) of Nakhon Ratchasima province, northeastern Thailand.

== History ==
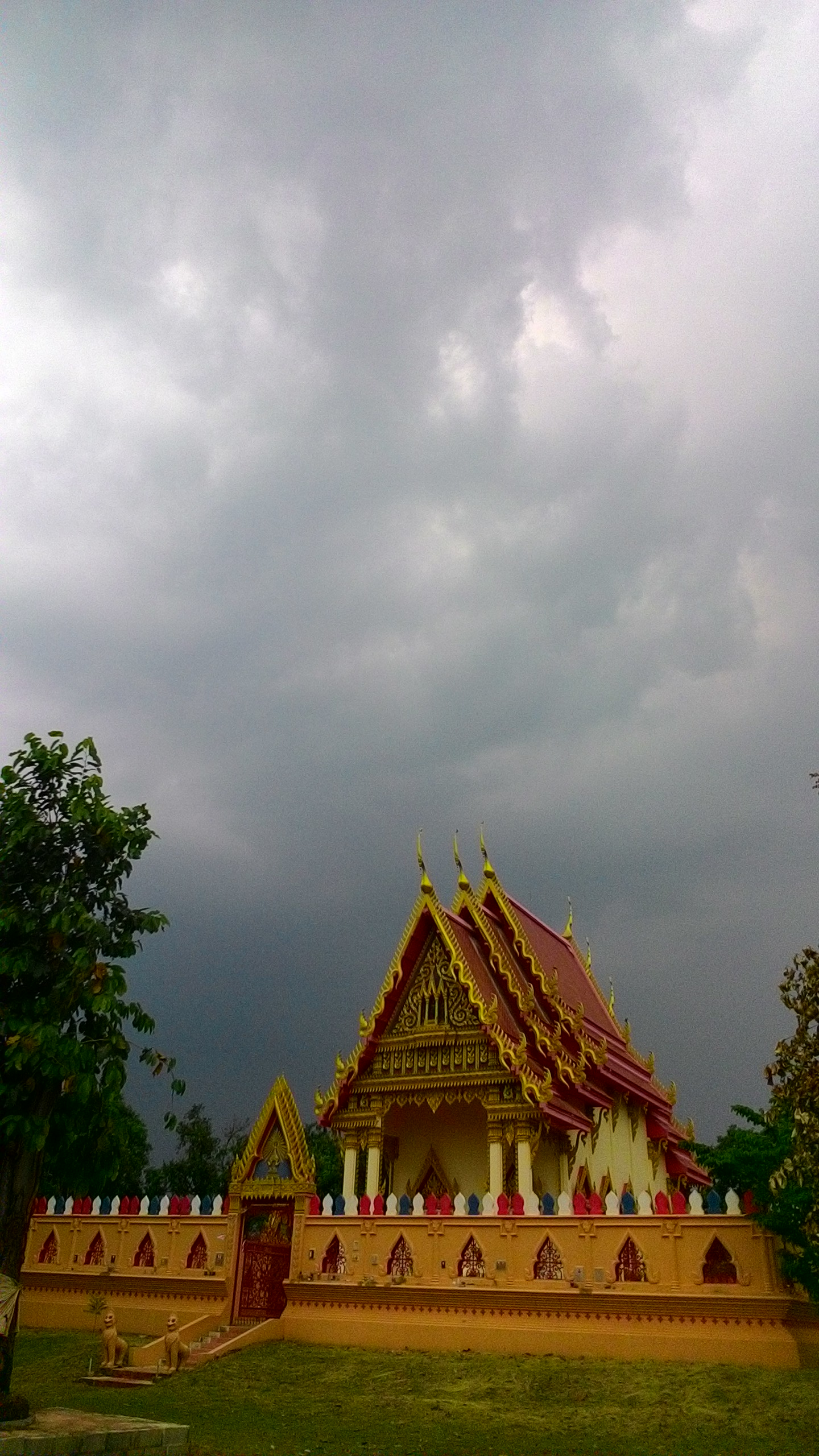
The ubosot of Wat Trai Sirimongkhon

Nong Bunnak was created as a minor district (king amphoe) on 1 July 1983 by separating the three tambons, Nong Bunnak, Saraphi, and Thai Charoen, from Chok Chai district. It was upgraded to a full district on 25 May 1989. In 2003 the district was renamed from Nong Bunnak to Nong Bun Mak.

== Geography ==
Neighbouring districts are (from the east clockwise): Nong Ki of Buriram province; Khon Buri, Chok Chai, and Chakkarat of Nakhon Ratchasima Province.

== Administration ==
The district is divided into nine subdistricts (tambons), which are further subdivided into 104 villages (mubans). There are no municipal (thesaban) areas, and nine tambon administrative organisations (TAO).

1.	Nong Bunnak	หนองบุนนาก
2.	Saraphi	สารภี
3.	Thai Charoen	ไทยเจริญ
4.	Nong Hua Raet	หนองหัวแรต
5.	Laem Thong	แหลมทอง
6.	Nong Takai	หนองตะไก้
7.	Lung Khwao	ลุงเขว้า
8.	Nong Mai Phai	หนองไม้ไผ่
9.	Ban Mai	บ้านใหม่
