= Ban Nong Tat railway station =

Railway station in Thailand

Ban Nong Tat บ้านหนองตาด

General information
- Location: Nong Tat Subdistrict, Mueang Buriram District; Buriram Province; Thailand
- Coordinates: 15°01′15″N 103°01′16″E
- Operator: State Railway of Thailand
- Manager: Ministry of Transport
- Line: Ubon Ratchathani Main Line
- Platforms: 1
- Tracks: 2

Construction
- Structure type: At-grade

Other information
- Station code: ตา.
- Classification: Class 3

Services
Preceding station	State Railway of Thailand	Following station
Ban Salaeng Phan towards Hua Lamphong or Krung Thep Aphiwat	Northeastern Line	Buriram towards Ubon Ratchathani
Location

Ban Nong Tat station (Thai: สถานีบ้านหนองตาด) is a railway station located in Nong Tat Subdistrict, Mueang Buriram District, Buriram Province. It is a class 3 railway station located 366.50 km (227.7 mi) from Bangkok railway station.
