= Chaloem Phra Kiat district, Nakhon Ratchasima =

Chaloem Phra Kiat เฉลิมพระเกียรติ
- District
- District location in Nakhon Ratchasima province
- Coordinates: 15°0′18″N 102°16′18″E
- Country: Thailand
- Province: Nakhon Ratchasima
- Seat: Tha Chang

Area
  - Total: 254.1 km^{2} (98.1 sq mi)

Population (2000)
  - Total: 33,151
  - Density: 130.5/km^{2} (338/sq mi)
- Time zone: UTC+7 (ICT)
- Postal code: 30230, 30000
- Geocode: 3032

Chaloem Phra Kiat (Thai: เฉลิมพระเกียรติ, pronounced [tɕʰā.lɤ̌ːm pʰráʔ kìat]; Northeastern Thai: เฉลิมพระเกียรติ, pronounced [sā.lɤ̌ːm pʰàʔ kìat]) is a district (amphoe) in the eastern part of Nakhon Ratchasima province, northeastern Thailand.

== History ==
Five tambons were separated from Chakkarat district to create the new district on 5 December 1996. It was one of five districts named Chaloem Phra Kiat created on the same date to commemorate the 50th anniversary of the ascension to the throne of King Bhumibol Adulyadej (Rama IX).

== Geography ==
Neighbouring districts are (from the north clockwise): Non Sung, Chakkarat, Chok Chai and Mueang Nakhon Ratchasima.

== Administration ==
The district is divided into five subdistricts (tambons). The township (thesaban tambon) of Tha Chang covers parts of tambons Tha Chang and Chang Thong.

1.	Chang Thong	ช้างทอง
2.	Tha Chang	ท่าช้าง
3.	Phra Phut	พระพุทธ
4.	Nong Ngu Lueam	หนองงูเหลือม
5.	Nong Yang	หนองยาง

== See also ==
- Nakhon Ratchasima Airport
