= Huai Thalaeng district =

Huai Thalaeng ห้วยแถลง
- District
- District location in Nakhon Ratchasima province
- Coordinates: 14°59′54″N 102°38′18″E
- Country: Thailand
- Province: Nakhon Ratchasima
- Seat: Huai Thalaeng

Area
  - Total: 495.2 km^{2} (191.2 sq mi)

Population (2000)
  - Total: 78,581
  - Density: 158.7/km^{2} (411/sq mi)
- Time zone: UTC+7 (ICT)
- Postal code: 30240
- Geocode: 3016

Huai Thalaeng (Thai: ห้วยแถลง, pronounced [hûaj tʰā.lɛ̌ːŋ]; Northeastern Thai: ห้วยแถลง, pronounced [hùaj tʰā.lɛ̌ːŋ]) is a district (amphoe) in the eastern part of Nakhon Ratchasima province, northeastern Thailand.

== History ==
Huai Thalaeng village was controlled by Tambon Ngio (ตำบลงิ้ว), Amphoe Phimai. It was upgraded to Tambon Huai Thalaeng in 1961 and became a minor district (king amphoe) later. It was upgraded to a full district in 1963.

== Geography ==
Neighbouring districts are (from the west clockwise): Chakkarat, Phimai, and Chum Phuang of Nakhon Ratchasima Province, and Lam Plai Mat and Nong Hong of Buriram province.

== Administration ==
The district is divided into 10 sub-districts (tambons). The township (thesaban tambon) Huai Thlaeng covers parts of tambons Huai Thalaeng and Thap Sawai.

1.	Huai Thalaeng	ห้วยแถลง
2.	Thap Sawai	ทับสวาย
3.	Mueang Phlapphla	เมืองพลับพลา
4.	Lung Takhian	หลุ่งตะเคียน
5.	Hin Dat	หินดาด
6.	Ngio	งิ้ว
7.	Kong Rot	กงรถ
8.	Lung Pradu	หลุ่งประดู่
9.	Tako	ตะโก
10.	Huai Khaen	ห้วยแคน
