= Buriram railway station =

Railway station in Buriram, Thailand

Coordinates: 15°00′12″N 103°06′29″E

Buriram บุรีรัมย์
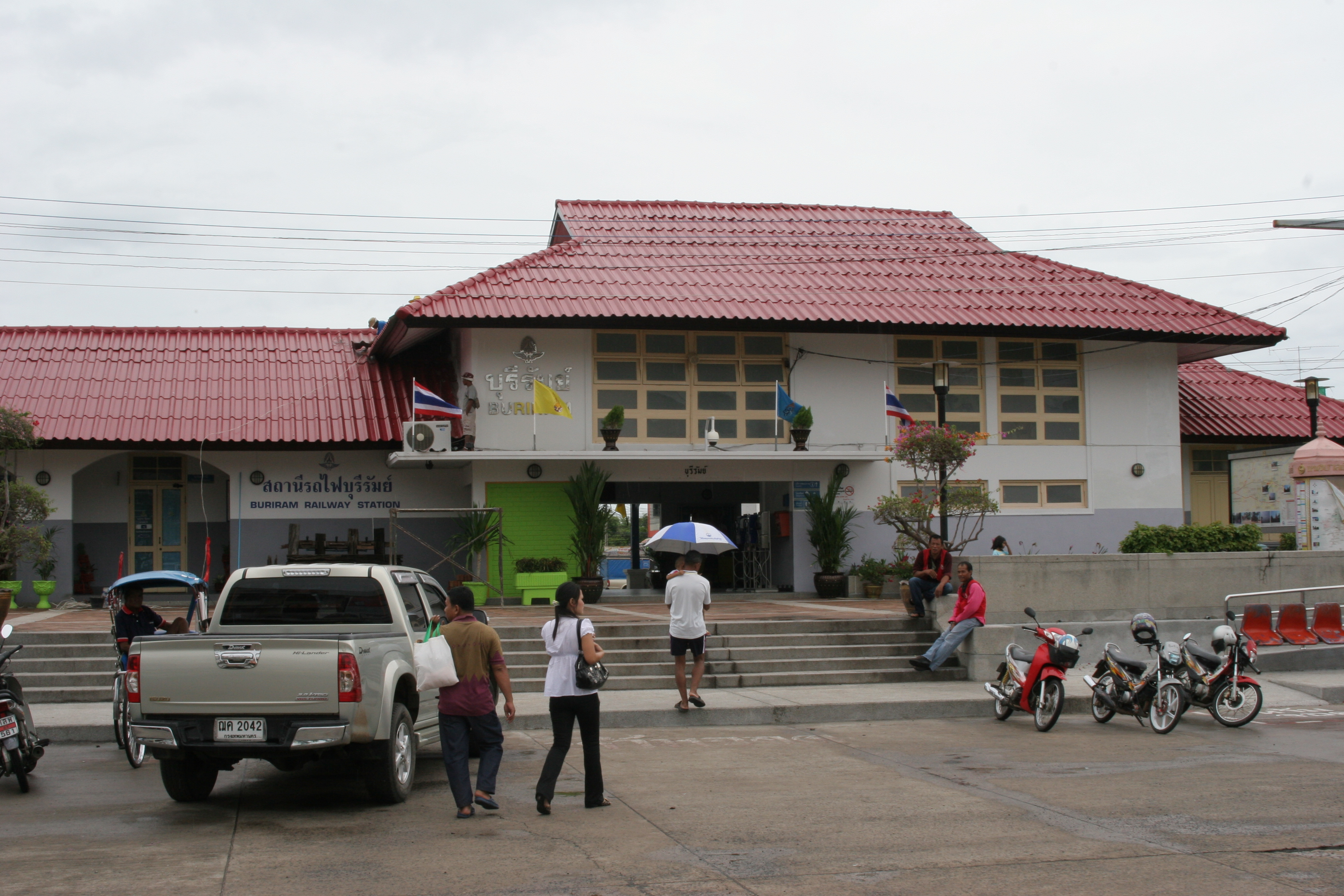
- Station in 2010

General information
- Location: Niwas Rd, Nai Muang, Muang, Buriram, 31000; Buriram Province; Thailand
- Operator: State Railway of Thailand
- Manager: Ministry of Transport
- Line: Ubon Ratchathani Main Line
- Platforms: 2
- Tracks: 3

Construction
- Structure type: At-grade
- Parking: Yes
- Accessible: Yes

Other information
- Station code: รย.
- Classification: Class 1

History
- Opened: 1 April 1925

Passengers
- 10,000+

Services
Preceding station	State Railway of Thailand	Following station
Ban Nong Tat towards Hua Lamphong or Krung Thep Aphiwat	Northeastern Line	Ban Tako Halt towards Ubon Ratchathani
Location

Buri Ram station (Thai: สถานีบุรีรัมย์), 1st class station is the main railway station in Buriram Province located on the northern side of the city of Buriram.

== Train services ==
- Special express No. 21 from Bangkok to Ubon Ratchathani
- Special express No. 22 from Ubon Ratchathani to Bangkok
- Special express No. 23 from Bangkok to Ubon Ratchathani
- Special express No. 24 from Ubon Ratchathani to Bangkok
- Express No. 67 from Bangkok to Ubon Ratchathani
- Express No. 68 from Ubon Ratchathani to Bangkok
- Express No. 71 from Bangkok to Ubon Ratchathani
- Express No. 72 from Ubon Ratchathani to Bangkok
- Rapid train No. 135 from Bangkok to Ubon Ratchathani
- Rapid train No. 136 from Ubon Ratchathani to Bangkok
- Rapid train No. 139 from Bangkok to Ubon Ratchathani
- Rapid train No. 140 from Ubon Ratchathani to Bangkok
- Rapid train No. 141 from Bangkok to Ubon Ratchathani
- Rapid train No. 142 from Ubon Ratchathani to Bangkok
- Rapid train No. 145 from Bangkok to Ubon Ratchathani
- Rapid train No. 146 from Ubon Ratchathani to Bangkok
- Ordinary train No. 233 from Bangkok to Surin
- Ordinary train No. 234 from Surin to Bangkok
- Local train No. 419 from Nakhon Ratchasima to Ubon Ratchathani
- Local train No. 420 from Ubon Ratchathani to Nakhon Ratchasima
- Local train No. 421 from Nakhon Ratchasima to Ubon Ratchathani
- Local train No. 426 from Ubon Ratchathani to Nakhon Ratchasima
- Local train No. 424 from Samrong Thab to Nakhon Ratchasima
- Local train No. 427 from Nakhon Ratchasima to Ubon Ratchathani
- Local train No. 428 from Ubon Ratchathani to Nakhon Ratchasima

== Local meatballs ==
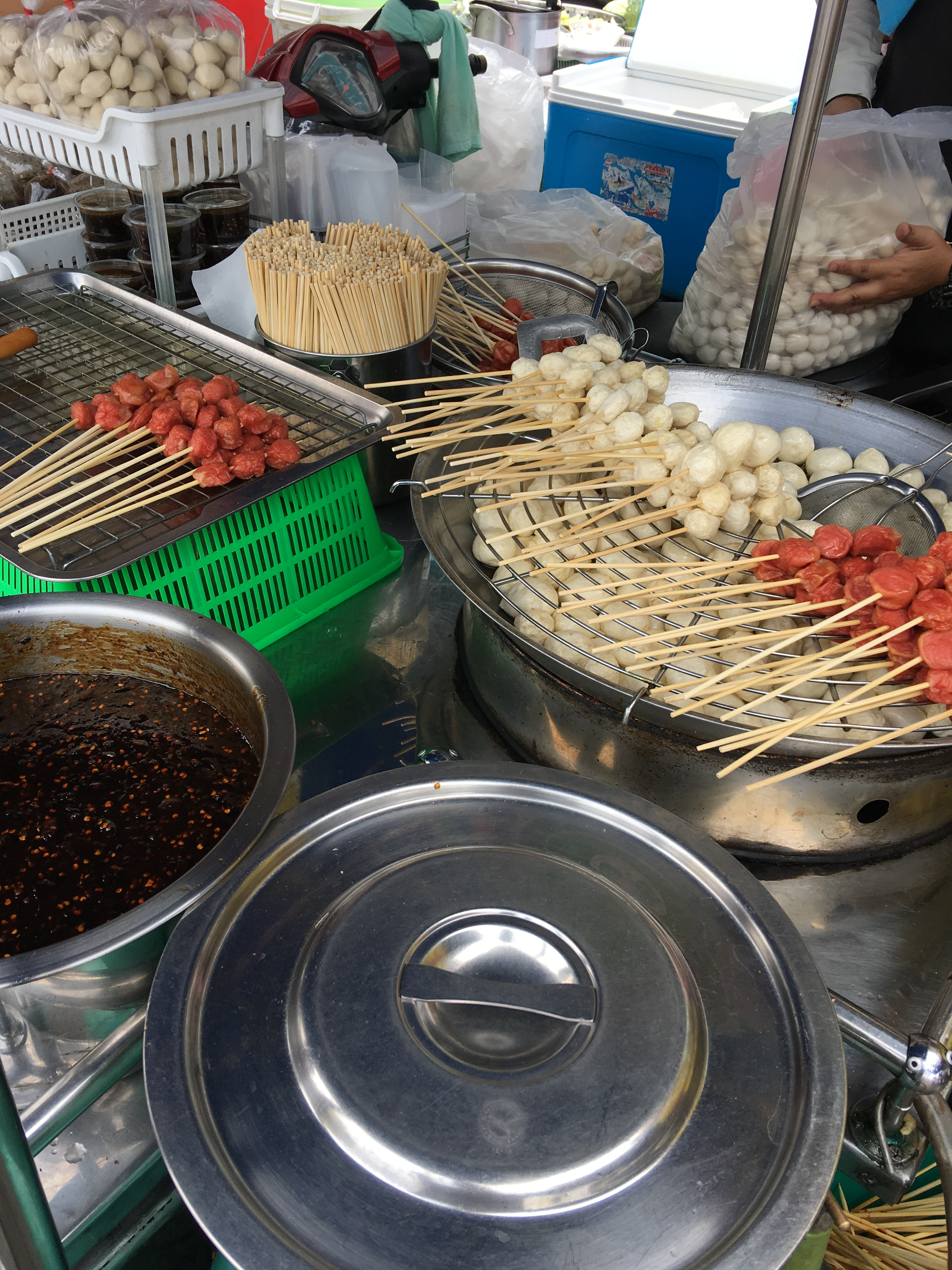
Notable local meatballs

In front of the station is a source of a Buri Ram local food known as Luk-chin yuen kin (ลูกชิ้นยืนกิน) "meatballs stand to eat". Customers can order meatballs, sausages, crispy wontons, crab sticks, fishcakes which are fried on the spot. Customers usually eat them on the spot and add sauces by dipping their skewer into a variety of dipping sauces. Buri Ram K-pop singer Lalisa Manobal stated that she greatly likes to eat these meatballs.

== Gallery ==
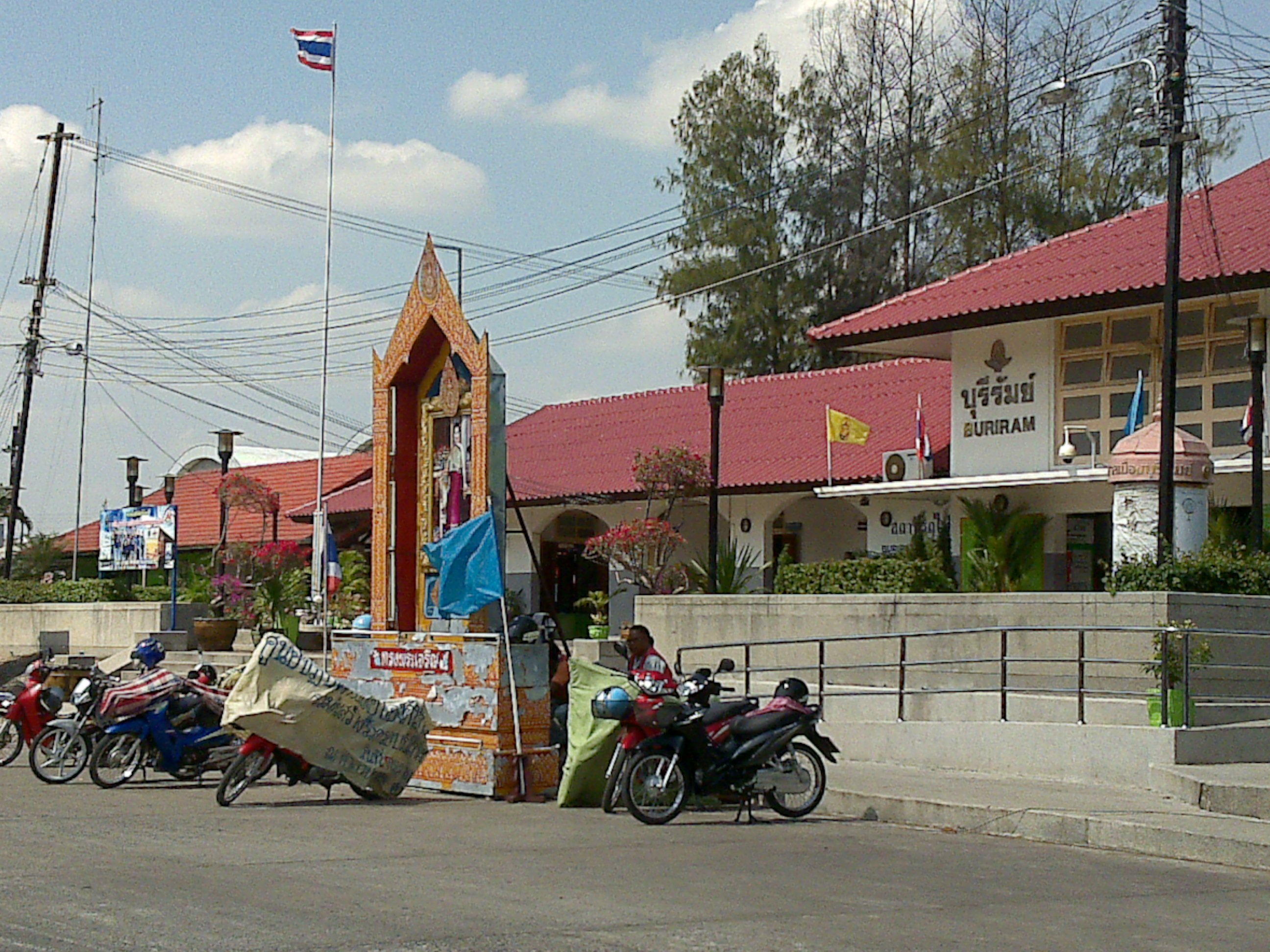
Station building

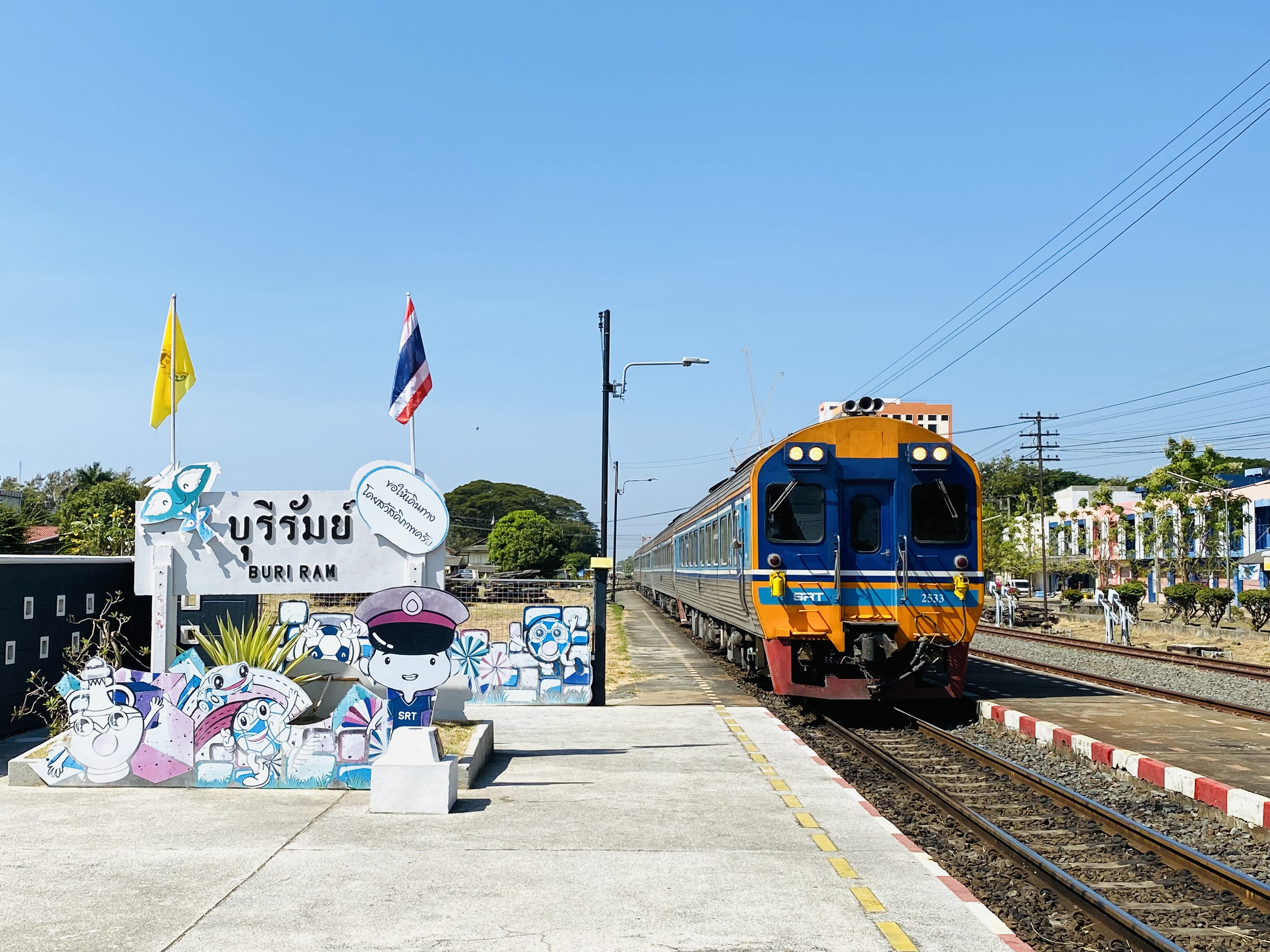
West side station sign with special express no. 21 approaching

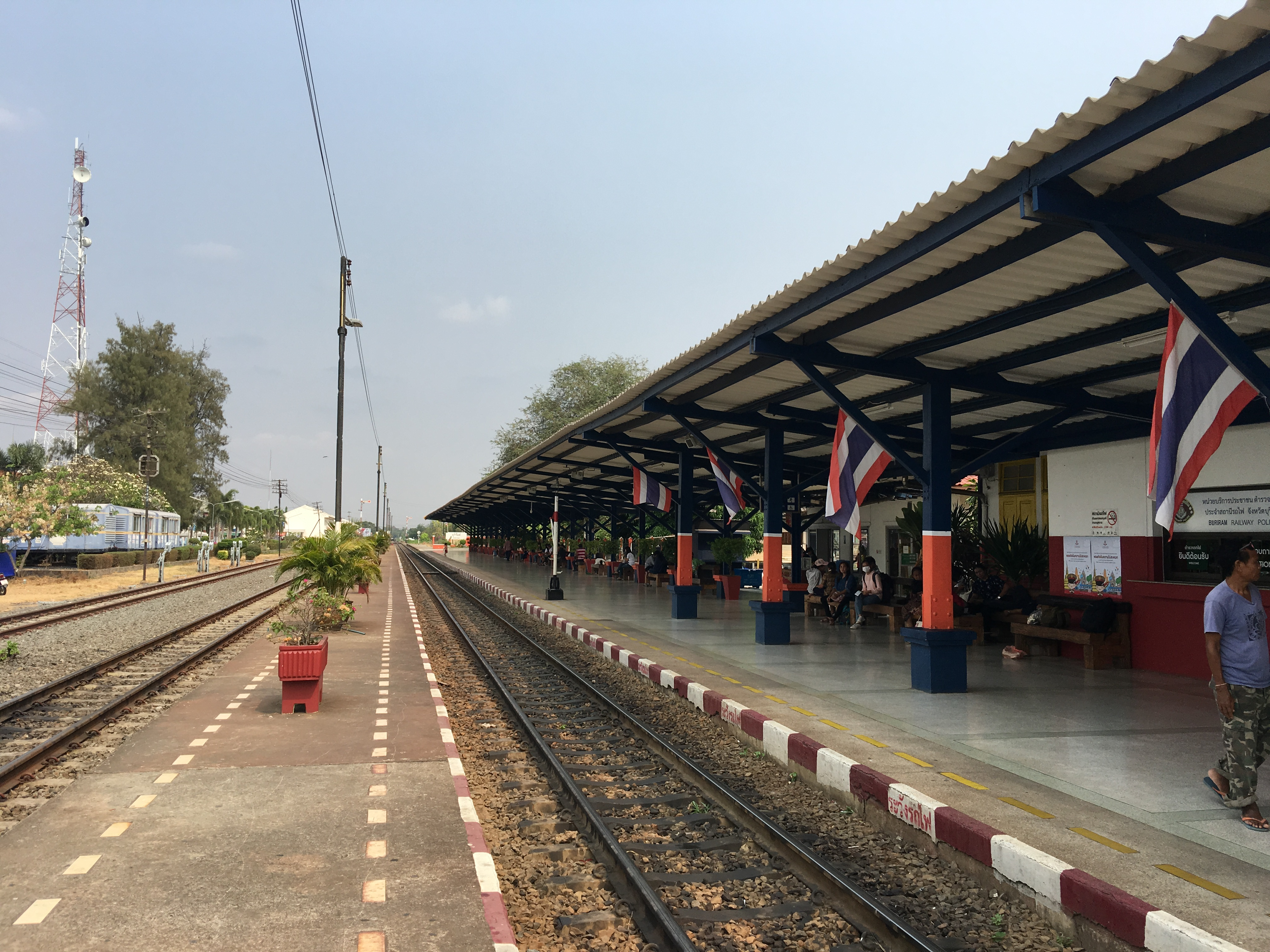
Station platforms without train

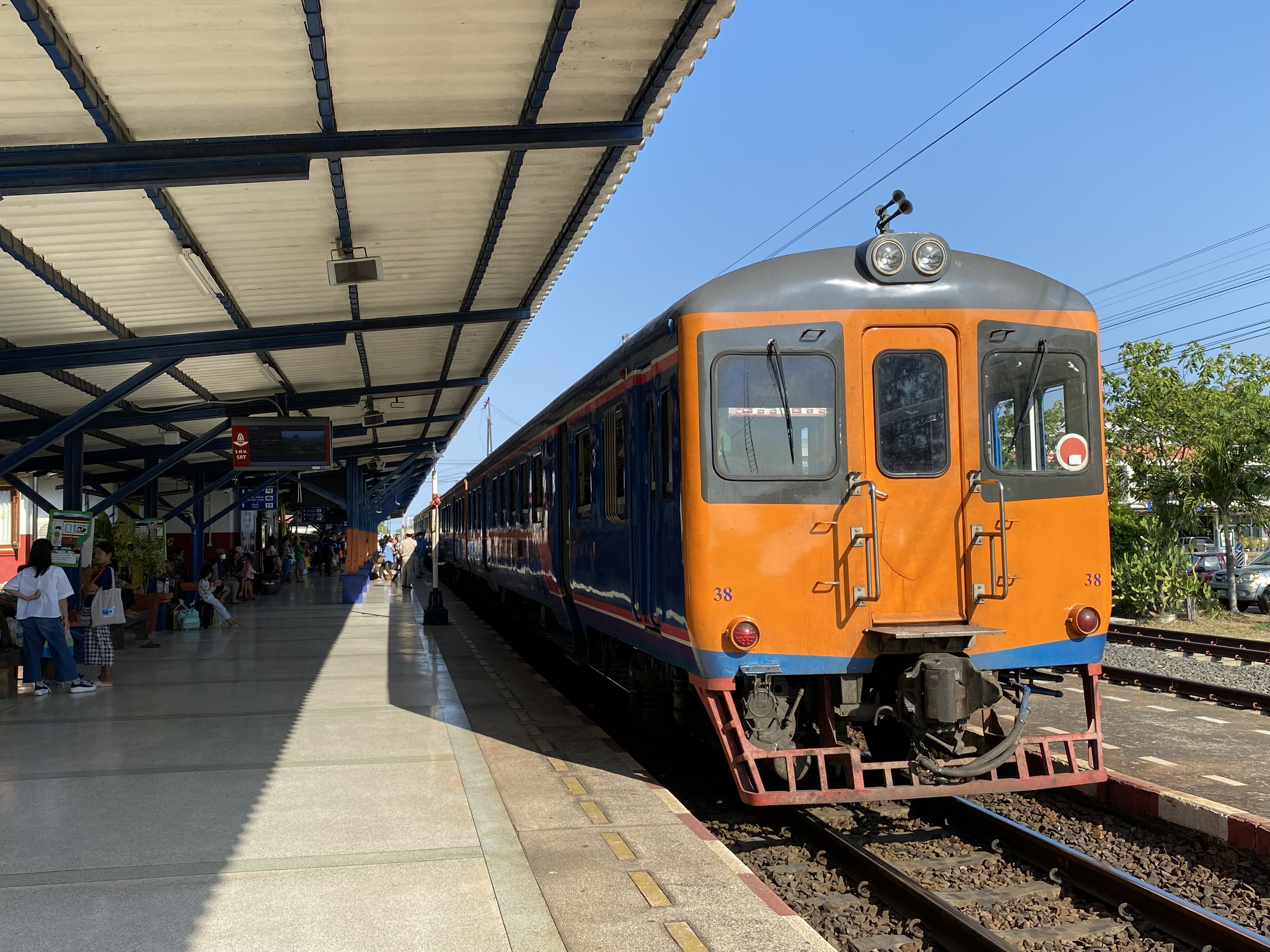
Station platform with local train

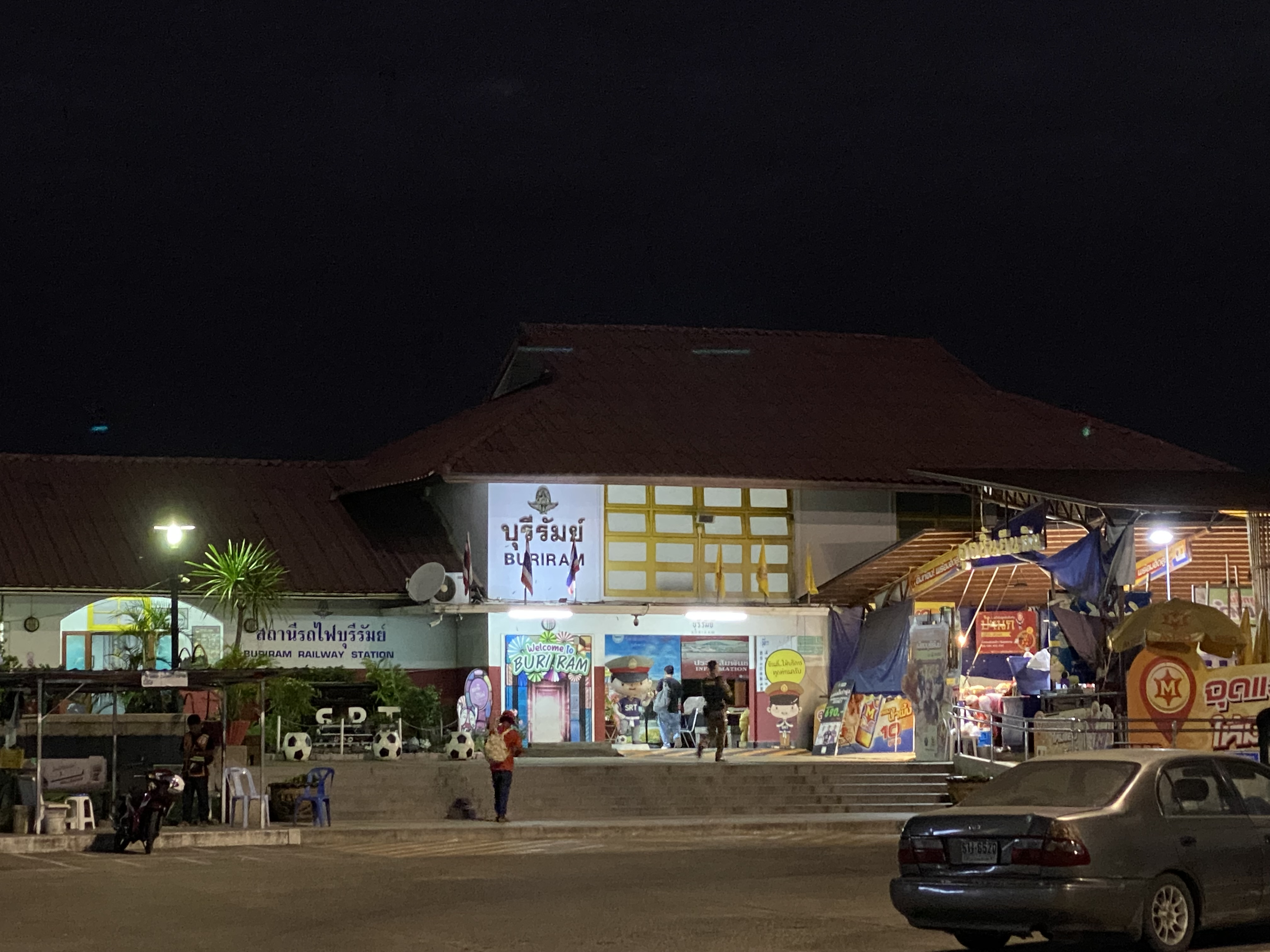
Station in the night

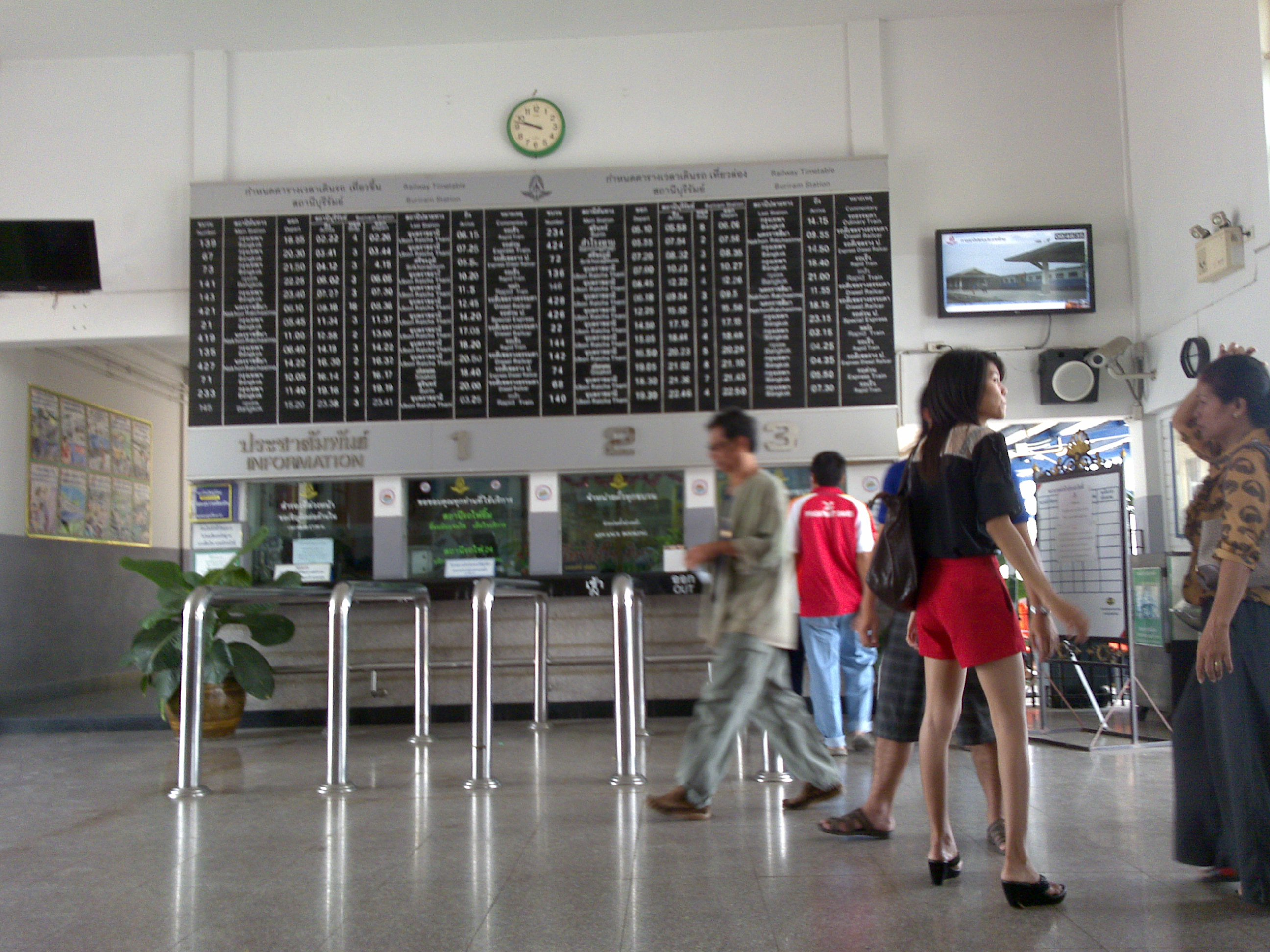
Station hall

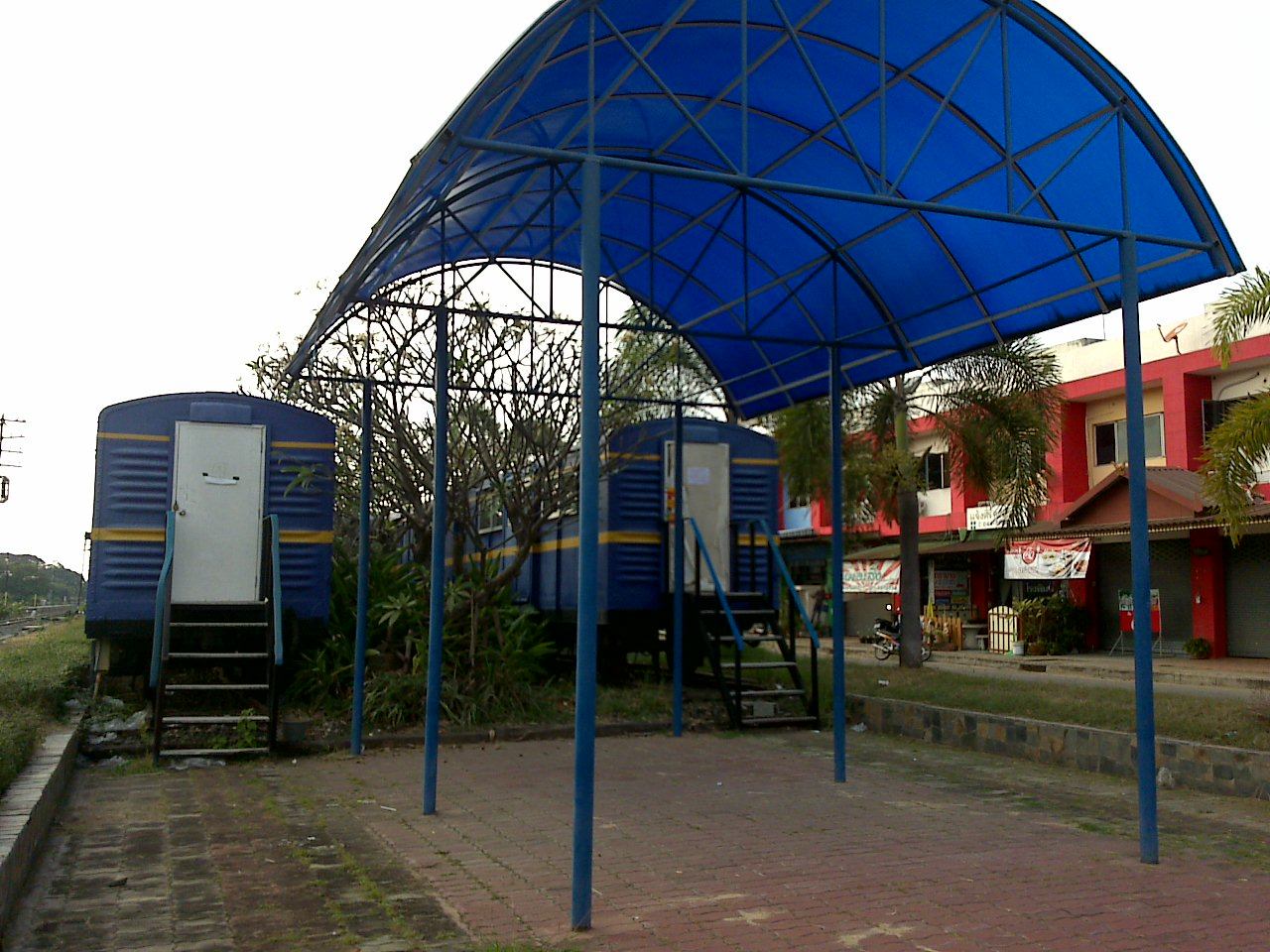
Railway library

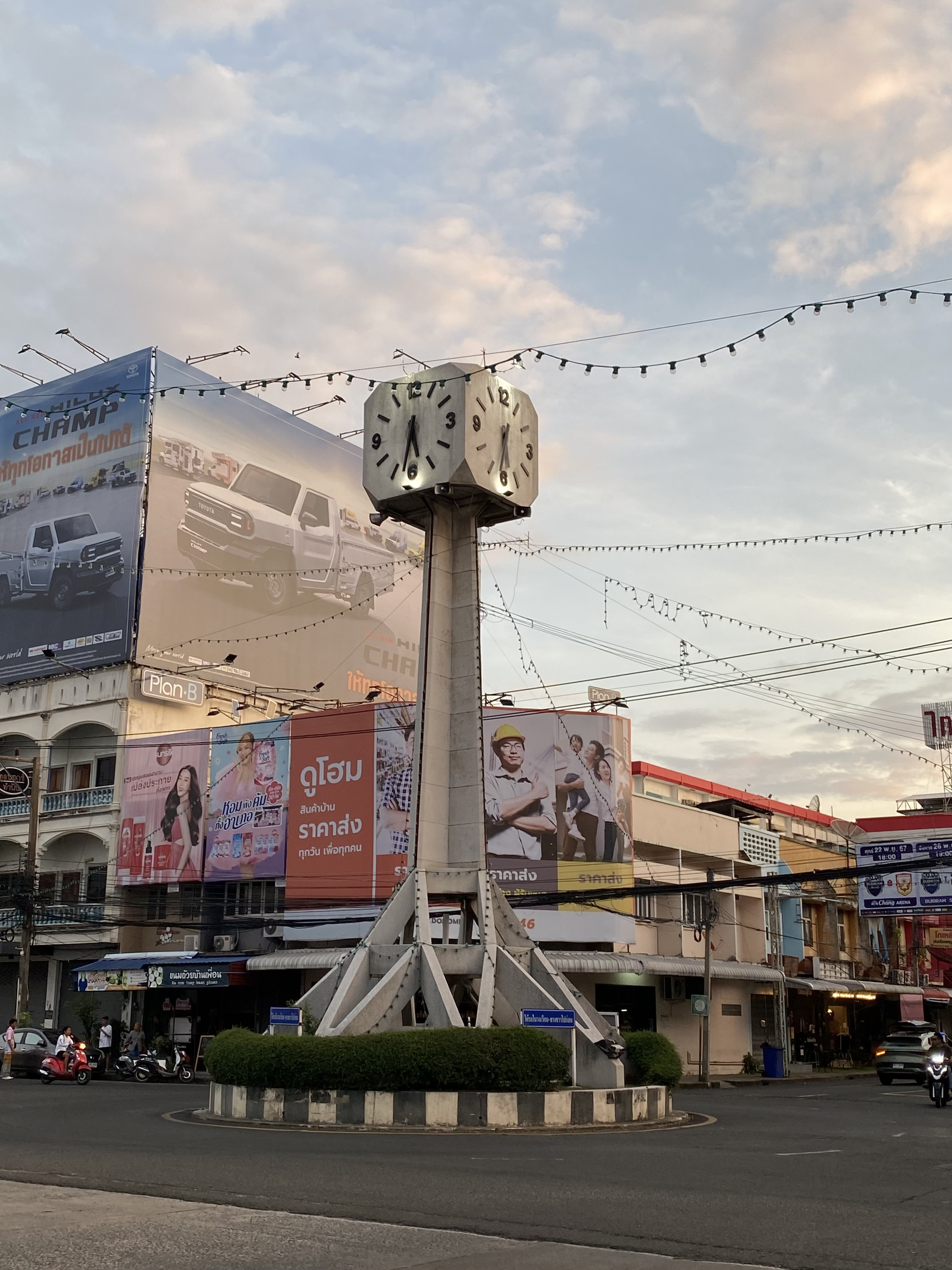
Clock tower near the station
