= Chakkarat district =

Chakkarat จักราช
- District
- District location in Nakhon Ratchasima province
- Coordinates: 15°0′48″N 102°24′48″E
- Country: Thailand
- Province: Nakhon Ratchasima
- Seat: Chakkarat

Area
  - Total: 501.7 km^{2} (193.7 sq mi)

Population (2000)
  - Total: 66,615
  - Density: 132.8/km^{2} (344/sq mi)
- Time zone: UTC+7 (ICT)
- Postal code: 30230
- Geocode: 3006

Chakkarat (Thai: จักราช, pronounced [tɕàk.kā.ràːt]; Northeastern Thai: จักราช, pronounced [tɕǎk.kā.làːt]) is a district (amphoe) in the eastern part of Nakhon Ratchasima province, northeastern Thailand.

== History ==
In 1927 Tha Chang village was upgraded to a minor district (king amphoe) of Mueang Nakhon Ratchasima district. It was upgraded to a full district in 1953, and at the same time renamed from Tha Chang to Chakkarat. The district office was moved to Ban Talat Chakkarat in 1964.

== Geography ==
Neighbouring districts are (from the north clockwise): Phimai and Huai Thalaeng of Nakhon Ratchasima Province; Nong Hong and Nong Ki of Buriram province; Nong Bun Mak, Chaloem Phra Kiat and Non Sung of Nakhon Ratchasima.

The main water resource is the Mun River.

== Administration ==
The district is divided into eight sub-districts (tambons). Chakkarat itself has township (thesaban tambon) status and covers part of tambon Chakkarat.

1.	Chakkarat	จักราช
3.	Thonglang	ทองหลาง
4.	Si Suk	สีสุก
5.	Nong Kham	หนองขาม
7.	Nong Phluang	หนองพลวง
10	Si Lako	ศรีละกอ
11.	Khlong Mueang	คลองเมือง
12.	Hin Khon	หินโคน

Missing numbers are tambons which now form Chaloem Phra Kiat District.
