= Phimai district =

Phimai พิมาย
- District
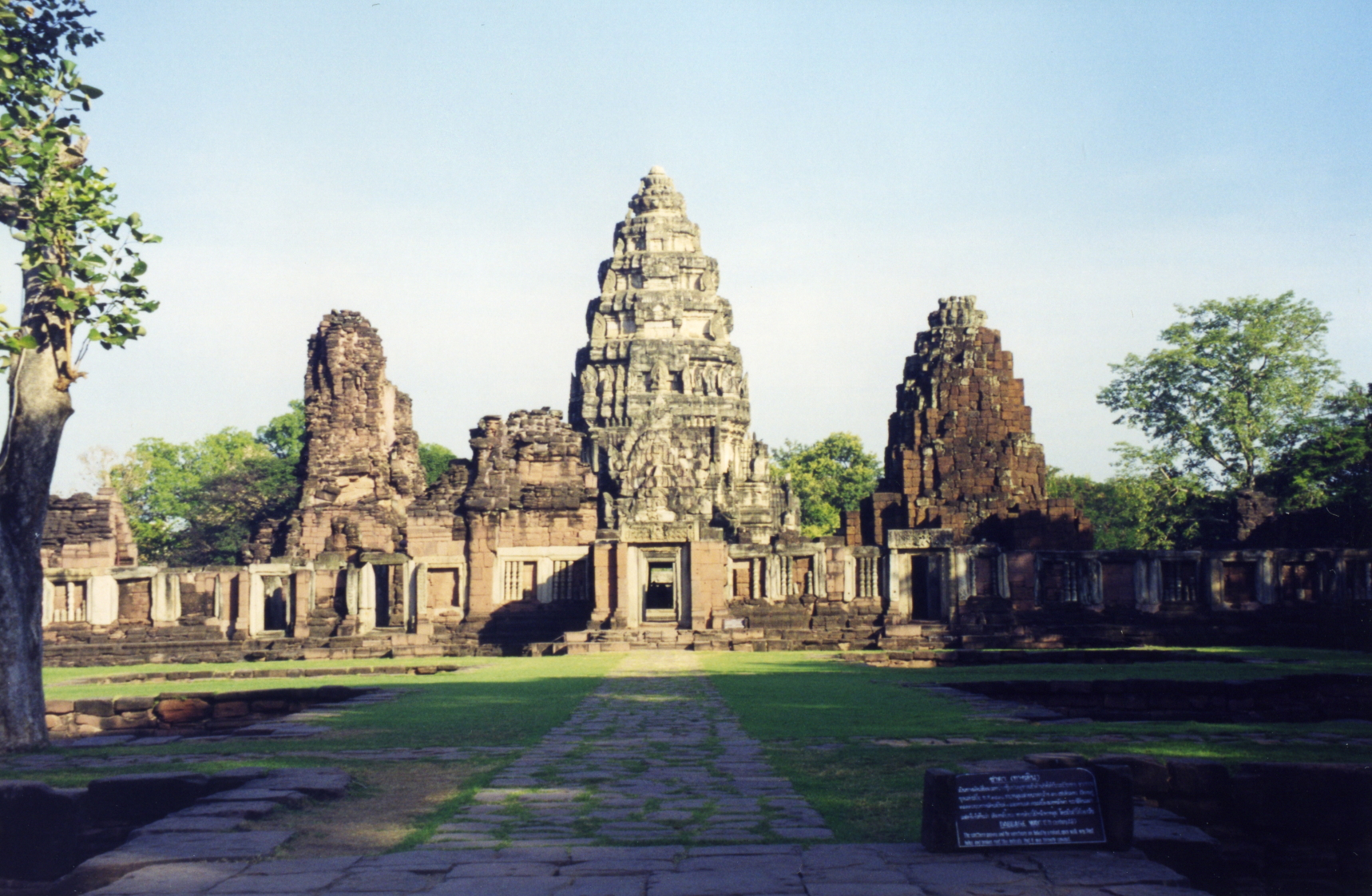
- Prasat Hin Phimai

- District location in Nakhon Ratchasima province
- Coordinates: 15°13′14″N 102°29′9″E
- Country: Thailand
- Province: Nakhon Ratchasima
- Seat: Nai Mueang

Area
  - Total: 896.9 km^{2} (346.3 sq mi)

Population (2000)
  - Total: 130,296
  - Density: 145.3/km^{2} (376/sq mi)
- Time zone: UTC+7 (ICT)
- Postal code: 30110
- Geocode: 3015

Phimai (Thai: พิมาย, pronounced [pʰí(ʔ).māːj]; Northeastern Thai: พิมาย, pronounced [pʰì(ʔ).mâːj]) is a district (amphoe) in the northeastern part of Nakhon Ratchasima province, northeastern Thailand.

== Geography ==
Phimai is a lowland, making it a suitable location for settlement and agriculture. The area is fed by the Chakkarat, Khem, and Mun rivers. There is also a source of salt, which is an important resource.

== History ==
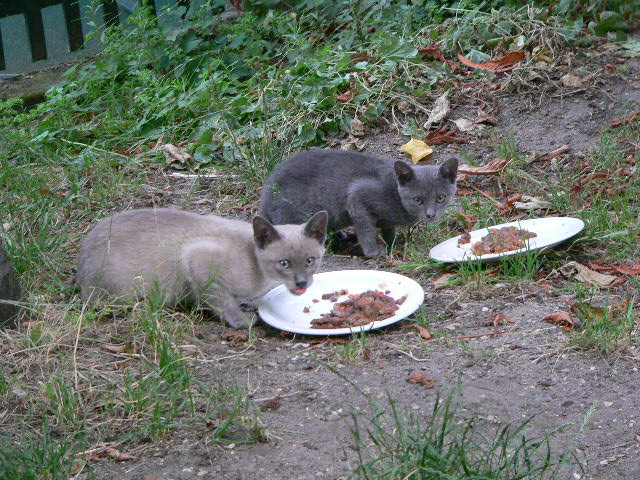
Korat Cat, Phimai is the origin of this breed of cat

Evidence of human settlement has been found in the Phimai area, indicating human residence since the prehistoric period, approximately 1,700–3,000 years ago. These traces were found to have continued until at least 1,500 years ago. The base of the building under Prasat Hin Phimai is made of bricks, therefore, it is assumed that it was probably originally the location of a Buddhist monastery.

Phimai was an ancient Khmer city named Vimai or Vimayapura. The Preah Khan inscription of 1191 records seventeen rest houses with hearths along the road from the Angkorian capital to Vimāya, and five of the seven Sanskrit inscriptions of 1186 recording Jayavarman VII's hospital foundations come from the Nakhon Ratchasima region. A stone pillar dating to the reign of King Suryavarman I was found, naming the city Bhirapura meaning 'strong city'. The rulers of Phimai during the Khmer era were all descendants of the Mahidharapura dynasty. Phimai has been an important city ever since, both during Ayutthaya and Rattanakosin times.

Mueang Phimai district was established in 1900. Khun Khachit Sarakam (ขุนขจิตสารกรรม) was the first governor.

Queen Mother Sriphatcharindra (Saovabha) visited Prasat Phimai and Sai Ngam (ficus forest) in 1911. The government officers and people renovated the city for the royal visit, and named six roads to commemorate the event.

In 1940 the government renamed the district by eliminating the word mueang.

== Administration ==
The district is divided into 12 sub-districts (tambons), which are further subdivided into 208 villages (mubans). There are two sub-district municipalities (thesaban tambons): Phimai covering parts of tambon Nai Mueang, and Rang Ka Yai the whole of tambon Rang Ka Yai. There are a further 12 tambon administrative organizations (TAO).

| No. | Name | Thai name |
|---|---|---|
| 1. | Nai Mueang | ในเมือง |
| 2. | Samrit | สัมฤทธิ์ |
| 3. | Bot | โบสถ์ |
| 4. | Krabueang Yai | กระเบื้องใหญ่ |
| 5. | Tha Luang | ท่าหลวง |
| 6. | Rang Ka Yai | รังกาใหญ่ |
| 7. | Chiwan | ชีวาน |
| 8. | Nikhom Sang Ton-eng | นิคมสร้างตนเอง |
| 9. | Krachon | กระชอน |
| 10. | Dong Yai | ดงใหญ่ |
| 11. | Than Lalot | ธารละหลอด |
| 12. | Nong Rawiang | หนองระเวียง |
