= Lam Plai Mat district =

Lam Plai Mat ลำปลายมาศ
- District
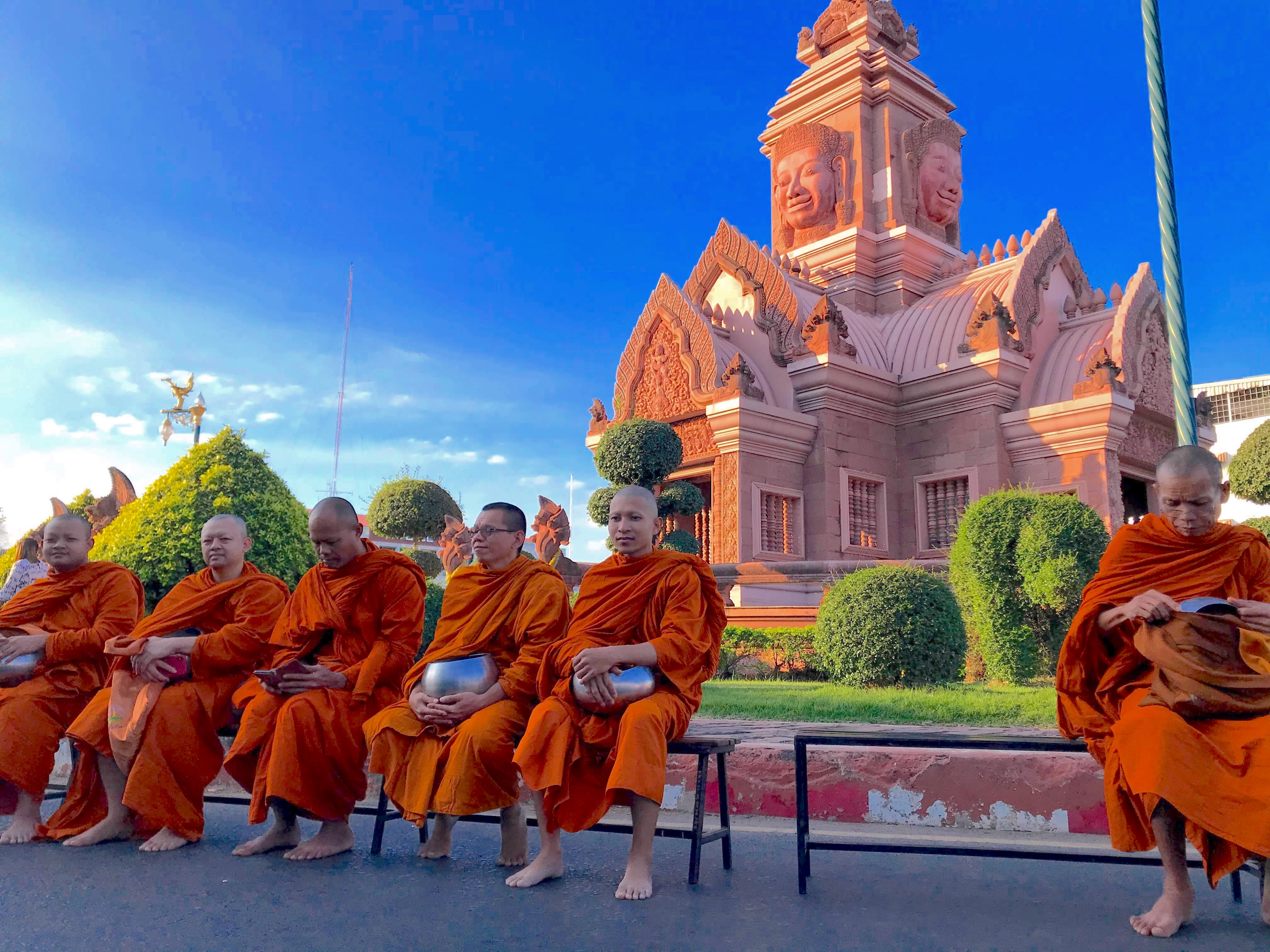
- Monks relaxing in Lam Plai Mat's city center

- District location in Buriram province
- Coordinates: 15°1′31″N 102°50′19″E
- Country: Thailand
- Province: Buriram

Area
  - Total: 802.9 km^{2} (310.0 sq mi)

Population (2019)
  - Total: 134,315
  - Density: 164.7/km^{2} (427/sq mi)
- Time zone: UTC+7 (ICT)
- Postal code: 31130
- Geocode: 3110

Lam Plai Mat (Thai: ลำปลายมาศ, pronounced [lām plāːj mâːt]; Northeastern Thai: ลำปลายมาศ, pronounced [lâm pāːj mâːt]) is a district (amphoe) of Buriram province, northeastern Thailand.

== Geography ==
Neighboring districts are (from the northeast clockwise) Khu Mueang, Mueang Buriram, Chamni, Nong Hong of Buriram Province, Huai Thalaeng, Chum Phuang, and Lam Thamenchai of Nakhon Ratchasima province.

== Administration ==
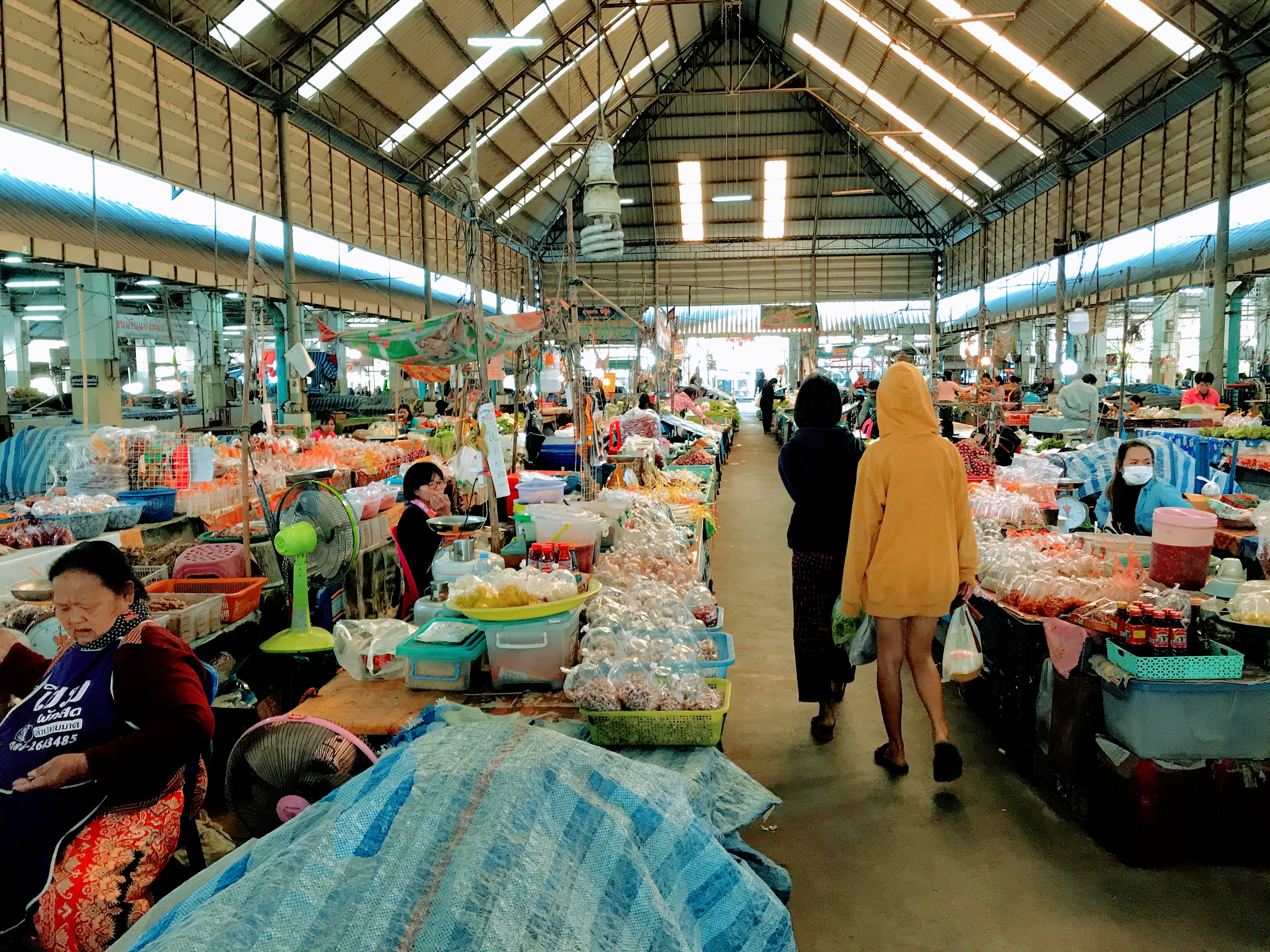
The fresh market in Lam Plai Mat

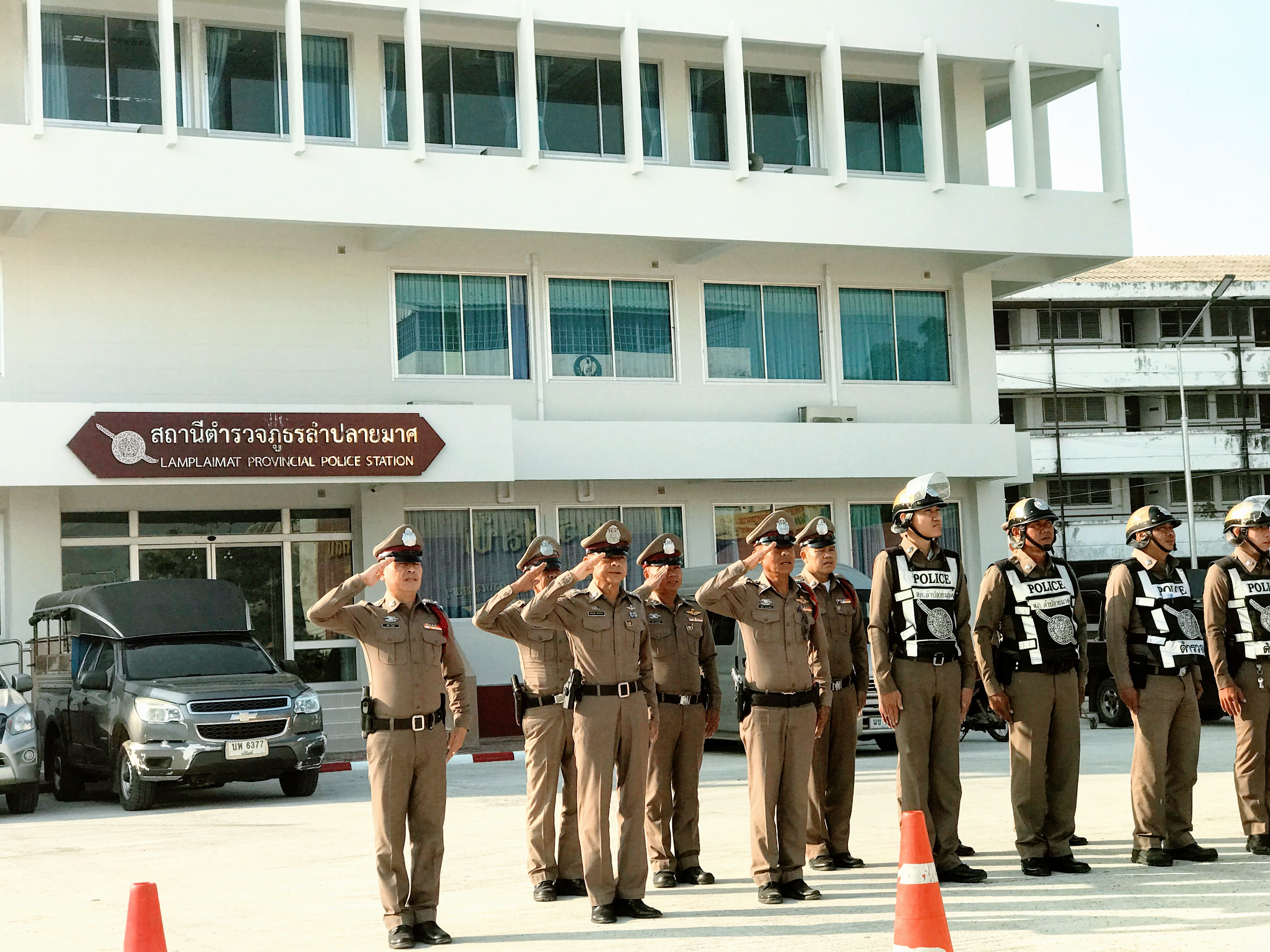
Police officers doing a morning greet

=== Central administration ===
The district Lam Plai Mat is subdivided into 16 subdistricts (Tambon), which are further subdivided into 216 administrative villages (Muban).

No.	Name	Thai	Villages	Pop.
1.	Lam Plai Mat	ลำปลายมาศ	10	10,094
2.	Nong Khu	หนองคู	14	8,955
3.	Salaeng Phan	แสลงพัน	17	9,407
4.	Thamen Chai	ทะเมนชัย	17	9,185
5.	Talat Pho	ตลาดโพธิ์	9	5,559
6.	Nong Kathing	หนองกะทิง	11	7,314
7.	Khok Klang	โคกกลาง	16	9,256
8.	Khok Sa-at	โคกสะอาด	16	10,006
9.	Mueang Faek	เมืองแฝก	17	10,566
10.	Ban Yang	บ้านยาง	13	8,243
11.	Phathairin	ผไทรินทร์	19	10,461
12.	Khok Lam	โคกล่าม	12	7,767
13.	Hin Khon	หินโคน	16	10,148
14.	Nong Bua Khok	หนองบัวโคก	13	8,017
15.	Bu Pho	บุโพธิ์	8	4,471
16.	Nong Don	หนองโดน	8	4,866

=== Local administration ===
There are 2 subdistrict municipalities (Thesaban Tambon) in the district:

- Thamen Chai (Thai: เทศบาลตำบลทะเมนชัย) consisting of parts of the subdistricts Thamen Chai, Nong Bua Khok.
- Lam Plai Mat (Thai: เทศบาลตำบลลำปลายมาศ) consisting of the complete subdistrict Lam Plai Mat and parts of the subdistricts Nong Khu, Hin Khon.

There are 15 subdistrict administrative organizations (SAO) in the district:

- Nong Khu (Thai: องค์การบริหารส่วนตำบลหนองคู) consisting of parts of the subdistrict Nong Khu.
- Salaeng Phan (Thai: องค์การบริหารส่วนตำบลแสลงพัน) consisting of the complete subdistrict Salaeng Phan.
- Thamen Chai (Thai: องค์การบริหารส่วนตำบลทะเมนชัย) consisting of parts of the subdistrict Thamen Chai.
- Talat Pho (Thai: องค์การบริหารส่วนตำบลตลาดโพธิ์) consisting of the complete subdistrict Talat Pho.
- Nong Kathing (Thai: องค์การบริหารส่วนตำบลหนองกะทิง) consisting of the complete subdistrict Nong Kathing.
- Khok Klang (Thai: องค์การบริหารส่วนตำบลโคกกลาง) consisting of the complete subdistrict Khok Klang.
- Khok Sa-at (Thai: องค์การบริหารส่วนตำบลโคกสะอาด) consisting of the complete subdistrict Khok Sa-at.
- Mueang Faek (Thai: องค์การบริหารส่วนตำบลเมืองแฝก) consisting of the complete subdistrict Mueang Faek.
- Ban Yang (Thai: องค์การบริหารส่วนตำบลบ้านยาง) consisting of the complete subdistrict Ban Yang.
- Phathairin (Thai: องค์การบริหารส่วนตำบลผไทรินทร์) consisting of the complete subdistrict Phathairin.
- Khok Lam (Thai: องค์การบริหารส่วนตำบลโคกล่าม) consisting of the complete subdistrict Khok Lam.
- Hin Khon (Thai: องค์การบริหารส่วนตำบลหินโคน) consisting of parts of the subdistrict Hin Khon.
- Nong Bua Khok (Thai: องค์การบริหารส่วนตำบลหนองบัวโคก) consisting of parts of the subdistrict Nong Bua Khok.
- Bu Pho (Thai: องค์การบริหารส่วนตำบลบุโพธิ์) consisting of the complete subdistrict Bu Pho.
- Nong Don (Thai: องค์การบริหารส่วนตำบลหนองโดน) consisting of the complete subdistrict Nong Don.

== Motto ==
The Lam Plai Mat District's Motto is "Mat river park, Thamen Chai stupa, great shire, tradition fabric, delicious food, Mee Chai center."
