= Thap Kwang =

Thap Kwang ทับกวาง
- Tambon
- Etymology: "Habitat of deers"
- Interactive map of Thap Kwang
- Coordinates: 14°36′37″N 101°4′31″E
- Country: Thailand
- Province: Saraburi
- District: Kaeng Khoi

Government
  - Type: Town Municipality
  - Mayor: Sommai Daengprasert
  - Deputy Mayor: Chaiyaphruek Chaiphut

Area
  - Total: 101 km^{2} (39 sq mi)

Population (2018)
  - Total: 19,425
  - Density: 192/km^{2} (498/sq mi)
- Time zone: UTC+7 (ICT)
- Postcode: 18260
- Area code: (+66) 02
- Website: https://www.tubkwang.go.th/

Thap Kwang (Thai: ทับกวาง, pronounced [tʰáp kwāːŋ]) is a tambon (subdistrict) of Kaeng Khoi District, Saraburi Province, central Thailand.

== History ==
Thap Kwang is an area with an old history dating back to the early Rattanakosin period. It is a residential community of Laotian who migrated from Kingdom of Vientiane since the King Taksin's reign. Hence the name "Ban Lao" (บ้านลาว, lit. 'hamlet of Laotian'). The population of Ban Lao increased during the King Nangklao (Rama III)'s reign. Later in the King Chulalongkorn (Rama V)'s reign, during which Prince Damrong Rajanubhab was Minister of the Interior, he was of the opinion that the name might create racial divisions. Therefore, the name was changed to "Thap Kwang", which means "habitat of deers" until the present.

Thap Kwang in the Boworadet Rebellion that occurred in October 1933 was a battleground fought between government forces with the militants led by General Prince Boworadet and Colonel Phraya Sri Sitthi Songkhram, especially on the northeastern railway line and 2–3 consecutive railway stations.

== Geography ==
Thap Kwang is the eastern part of Kaeng Khoi District. It is about 10 km (6.2 mi) from downtown Kaeng Khoi and lined in the northeast of downtown Saraburi. It is 22 km (13.7 mi) from Mueang Saraburi District. The topography is plateau and mountainous.

Its adjoining subdistricts, clockwise from the north, are Tha Khlo, Mittraphap, Cham Phak Phaeo, and Ban Pa. All of them in Kaeng Khoi District, except Mittraphap, which depends on neighbouring Muak Lek District.

== Administration ==
Thap Kwang has the status of a town municipality. It is considered the first town municipality of Saraburi which was raised from subdistrict municipality in 2012.

The entire subdistrict area is administered by the Thap Kwang Municipality (เทศบาลเมืองทับกวาง).

It consists of 10 administrative muban (village).

No.	Name	Thai
1.	Ban Phai Tai	บ้านไผ่ใต้
2.	Ban Thai	บ้านไทย
3.	Ban Thap Kwang	บ้านทับกวาง
4.	Ban Sup Bon	บ้านซับบอน
5.	Ban Khao Ket	บ้านเขาเกตุ
6.	Ban Nong Phak Bung	บ้านหนองผักบุ้ง
7.	Ban Pa Phai Nuea	บ้านป่าไผ่เหนือ
8.	Ban Rai	บ้านไร่
9.	Ban Tham Nam Pu	บ้านถ้ำน้ำพุ
10.	Ban Don Yo	บ้านดอนยอ

Thap Kwang also consists of 32 communities.

The seal of town municipality shows a stag with beautiful antlers.

== Population ==
In 2018, Thap Kwang had a total population of 19,425 (9,667 men, and 9,758 women). Most of them engaged in agriculture, livestock, labour, company employees and trading.

== Transportation ==
Mittraphap Road, otherwise known as Highway 2 is the main thoroughfare of the area.

Thap Kwang is also crossed by the northeastern line of the State Railway of Thailand (SRT) with two stations: Map Kabao, and Pha Sadet.

== Places ==
- Wat Tham Phra Phothisat, Thai Buddhist temple surrounded by peaceful atmospheres with the lush of plants, outstanding cave, and small waterfall.
- Pha Sadet Railway Station, a historic railway station.

== See also ==
- List of municipalities in Thailand
