= Vimolchatra =

Thai princess (1921 - 2009)

Vimalachatra
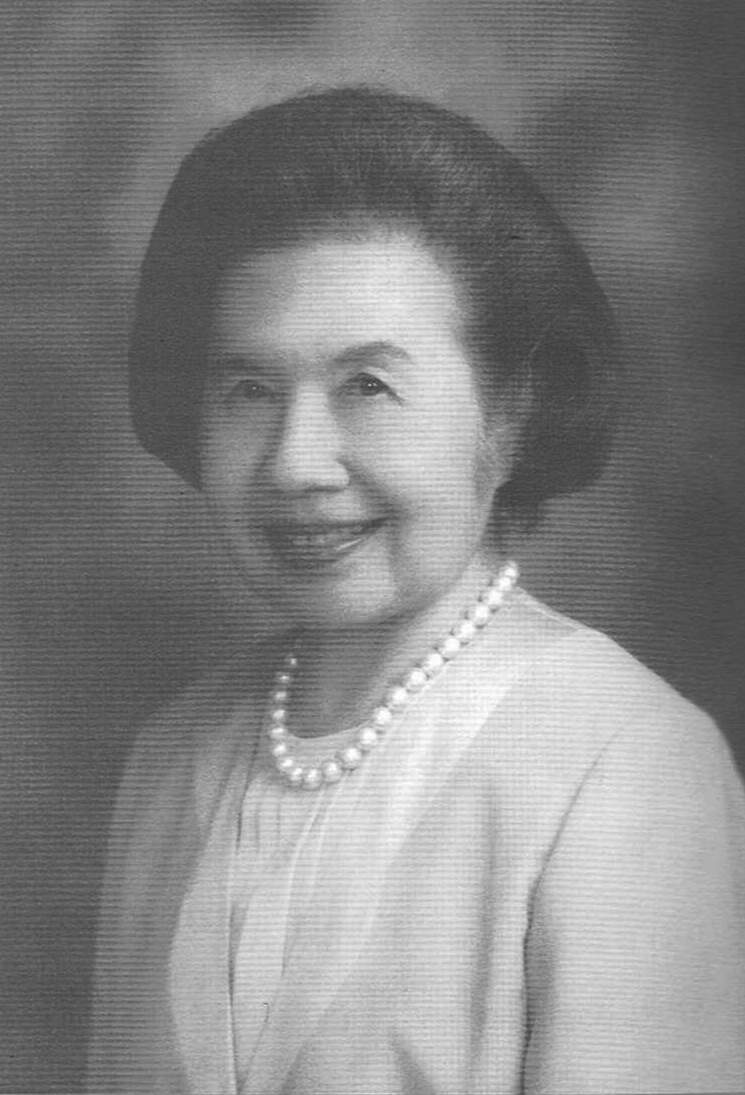
- Born: 27 June 1921; Bangkok, Siam
- Died: 5 December 2009 (aged 88); Bangkok, Thailand
- Spouse: Prince Udaya Chalermlabh Vudhijaya
- Issue: M.R. Chalermchatra Vudhijaya; M.R. Phromchatra Savastivatana
- House: Chatrajaya family (by birth); Vudhijaya family (by marriage) (Chakri dynasty)
- Father: Purachatra Jayakara, Prince of Kamphaengphet
- Mother: Princess Prabhavasit Narumon

Vimalachatra (Thai: วิมลฉัตร; RTGS: Wimonchat; 27 June 1921 – 5 December 2009), Her Full title : Her Highness Princess Vimalachatra was a Princess of Thailand and member of the Thai royal family, a granddaughter of King Chulalongkorn. She was one of the longest-living royal personages in Thailand.

== Biography ==
Princess Vimalachatra was born on 27 June 1921, in Bangkok, Thailand. She is the second daughter and youngest child of Prince Purachatra Jayakara, the Prince of Kamphaengphet (son of Chulalongkorn and Chao Chom Manda Wad). Her mother is Princess Prabhavasidhi Narumala of Siam (daughter of Prince Chaturanta Rasmi, the Prince Chakrabadibongse and Mom Rajawongse Savang Siriwongse. She is the direct granddaughter of King Chulalongkorn and also the great-granddaughter of Mongkut. She has 2 siblings; 1 elder sisters, and 1 elder brother:

- Princess Mayurachatra (7 March 1906 – 11 August 1970), married Prince Sohbhana Bharadaya Savastivatana, has issue
- Prince Prem Purachatra (12 August 1915 – 24 July 1981), married Ngamchit Sarasas, no issue

== Marriage ==
Princess Vimalachatra married Prince Udaya Chalermlabh Vudhijaya, son of Prince Vudhijaya Chalermlabha, the Prince Singhavikrom Kriangkrai on 1 May 1939. The couple have a son and a daughter;

- Mom Rajawongse Chalermchatra Vudhijaya (born 16 June 1942) married Aim-orn Busbonk, has a son and a daughter
  - Mom Luang Apichit Vudhijaya (born 15 July 1969)
  - Mom Luang Atitra Vudhijaya (born 17 September 1972)
- Mom Rajawongse Phromchatra Vudhijaya (born 2 April 1948) married Mom Rajawongse Jisnusan Savastivatana, has 2 daughters
  - Mom Luang Sasibha Savastivatana (born 17 April 1975)
  - Mom Luang Chandrabha Savastivatana (born 20 May 1978)

Princess Vimalachatra performs many royal functions and many social duties on behalf of the King and Queen. She is the president of King Rama IX Park Foundation. She has shown keen interest in public affairs and education of the poor around the country.

She died in the early of 5 December 2009, at Praram 9 Hospital, Bangkok from renal failure. She died on King Bhumibol Adulyadej's 82nd birthday, before the royal birthday ceremony at the Grand Palace; seven days of Royal funeral were held at Wat Debsirin.

== Royal decorations ==
- Dame Cross of the Most Illustrious Order of Chula Chom Klao
- Dame Grand Cordon of the Most Exalted Order of the White Elephant
- Dame Grand Cordon of the Most Noble Order of the Crown of Thailand
- King Rama IX the Great Royal Cypher Medal (2nd Class)

== Honorary degrees ==
- 1993: Honorary Doctor of Fine and Applied Arts, Rajamangala University of Technology
- 1997: Honorary Doctor of Arts, Siam University
- 1999: Honorary Doctor of Arts, Suan Sunandha Rajabhat University
