= Prabhavasit Narimol =

Thai princess (1885–1963)

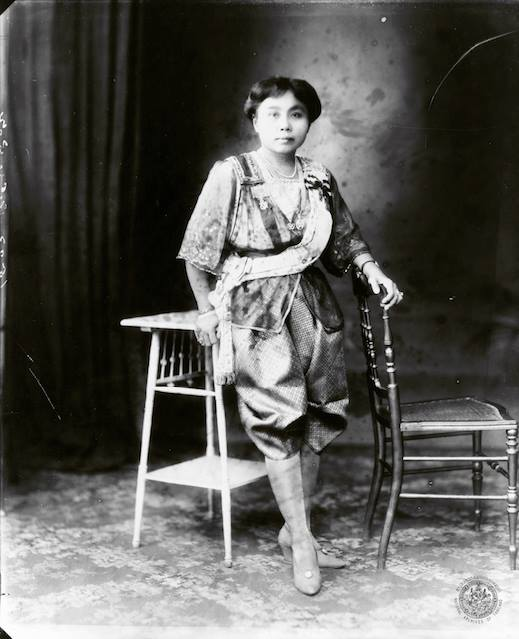
- Photographic portrait
- Born: Mom Chao Prabhavasit Narimol; 11 June 1885; Bangkok, Siam
- Died: 15 February 1963 (aged 77); Bangkok, Thailand
- Spouse: Purachatra Jayakara, Prince of Kamphaengphet (m. 1904; died 1936)
- Issue: Princess Mayurachatra; Prince Prem Purachatra; Princess Vimolchatra
Names
- Her Royal Highness Princess Prabhavasit Narimol
- House: Chakri dynasty
- Father: Chaturonrasmi, Prince Chakkrabatradipongse
- Mother: Sawang Chakrabandh

Prabhavasit Narimol (Thai: ประภาวสิตนฤมล; RTGS: Praphawasit Naruemon, also spelled Prabhavasiddi; 11 June 1885 – 15 February 1963), was a Princess of Siam (later Thailand) and member of the Siamese (then Thai) royal family as one of the daughters of Chaturonrasmi, Prince Chakkrabatradipongse, son of Mongkut, King Rama IV of Siam. After her marriage to Purachatra Jayakara, Prince of Kamphaengphet, son of Chulalongkorn, King Rama V of Siam (one of Mongkut's son), she became known as The Princess of Kamphaengphet.

== Biography ==
Mom Chao (Her Serene Highness Princess) Prabhavasit Narimol (Thai: หม่อมเจ้าประภาวสิตนฤมล) was born on 11 June 1885 as the youngest daughter of Chaturonrasmi, Prince Chakkrabatradipongse (son of Mongkut, King Rama IV of Siam) and one of his wife Mom Rajawongse Sawang Chakrabandh, his primary royal consort.

Her initial title was Mom Chao, but she was elevated to the Phra Wonwong Thoe Phra Ong Chao rank (Her Highness Princess) on 26 November 1893, upon order of Chulalongkorn, King Rama V of Siam. Lately, she was also elevated to the Phra Chao Baromwongse Thoe Phra Ong Chao rank (Her Royal Highness Princess; Thai: พระเจ้าวรวงศ์เธอ พระองค์เจ้าประภาวสิตนฤมล) on 12 April 1900.

On 16 November 1904, aged 19, she married her cousin, Purachatra Jayakara, Prince of Kamphaengphet, son of Chulalongkorn, King Rama V of Siam and one of his junior wife, Wat. They have four children: one son and three daughters. After her marriage, she became known as "The Princess of Kamphaengphet". Her only son originated the Purachatra branch of the Royal Family (Thai: ราชสกุลบุรฉัตร).

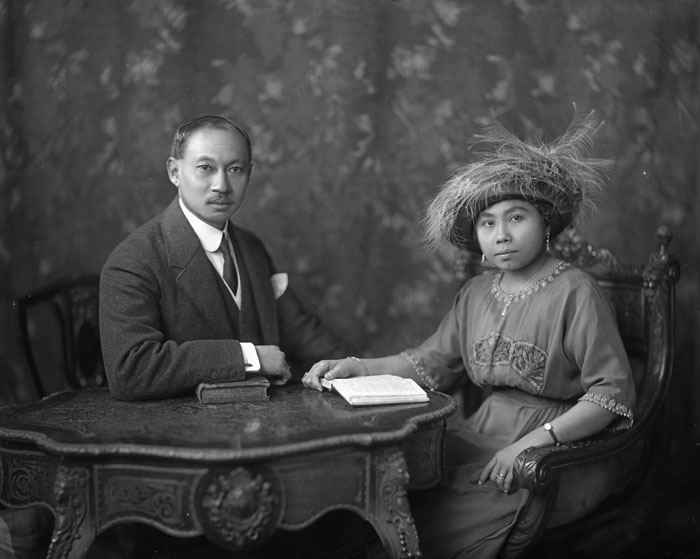
Princess Prabhavasit Narimol with her husband Prince Purachatra Jayakara, in London, on 2 June 1920.

In June 1920, she accompanied her husband on an official visit to the United Kingdom. In 1927, Princess Prabhavasit Narimol accompanied her husband and their first daughter Princess Mayurachatra on an official visit to Brisbane, Australia.

Widowed in 1936, Princess Prabhavasit Narimol died on 15 February 1963 in Bangkok, aged 77.

== Issue ==
Princess Prabhavasit Narimol and Prince Purachatra have had four children, 1 son and 3 daughters:

- HH Princess Mayurachatra (7 March 1906 – 11 August 1970); she married Mom Chao (His Serene Highness) Prince Sohbhana Bharadaya Savastivatana, and they have issue.
- HH Princess N.N. (11 October 1910 – 6 April 1911); she died in infancy.
- HH Prince Prem Purachatra (12 August 1915 – 24 July 1981); he married Ngamchitti Sarsas, and had no issue. He originated the Purachatra branch of the Thai Royal family (Thai: ราชสกุลบุรฉัตร), separated from his father.
- HH Princess Vimolchatra (27 June 1921 – 5 December 2009); she married Mom Chao (His Serene Highness) Prince Udaya Chalermlabh Vudhijaya, son of Prince Vuthichaya Chalermlabha, the Prince Singhavikrom Kriangkrai, and they have issue.

== Royal decorations ==
- Dame Cross of the Most Illustrious Order of Chula Chom Klao (Second class)
- King Rama V Royal Cypher Medal, Third Class
- King Rama VI Royal Cypher Medal, Second Class
- King Rama VII Royal Cypher Medal, Third Class
- King Rama VIII Royal Cypher Medal, Second Class
- King Rama IX Royal Cypher Medal, First Class
