= Ban Chong Tai railway station =

Railway station in Thailand

Ban Chong Tai บ้านช่องใต้
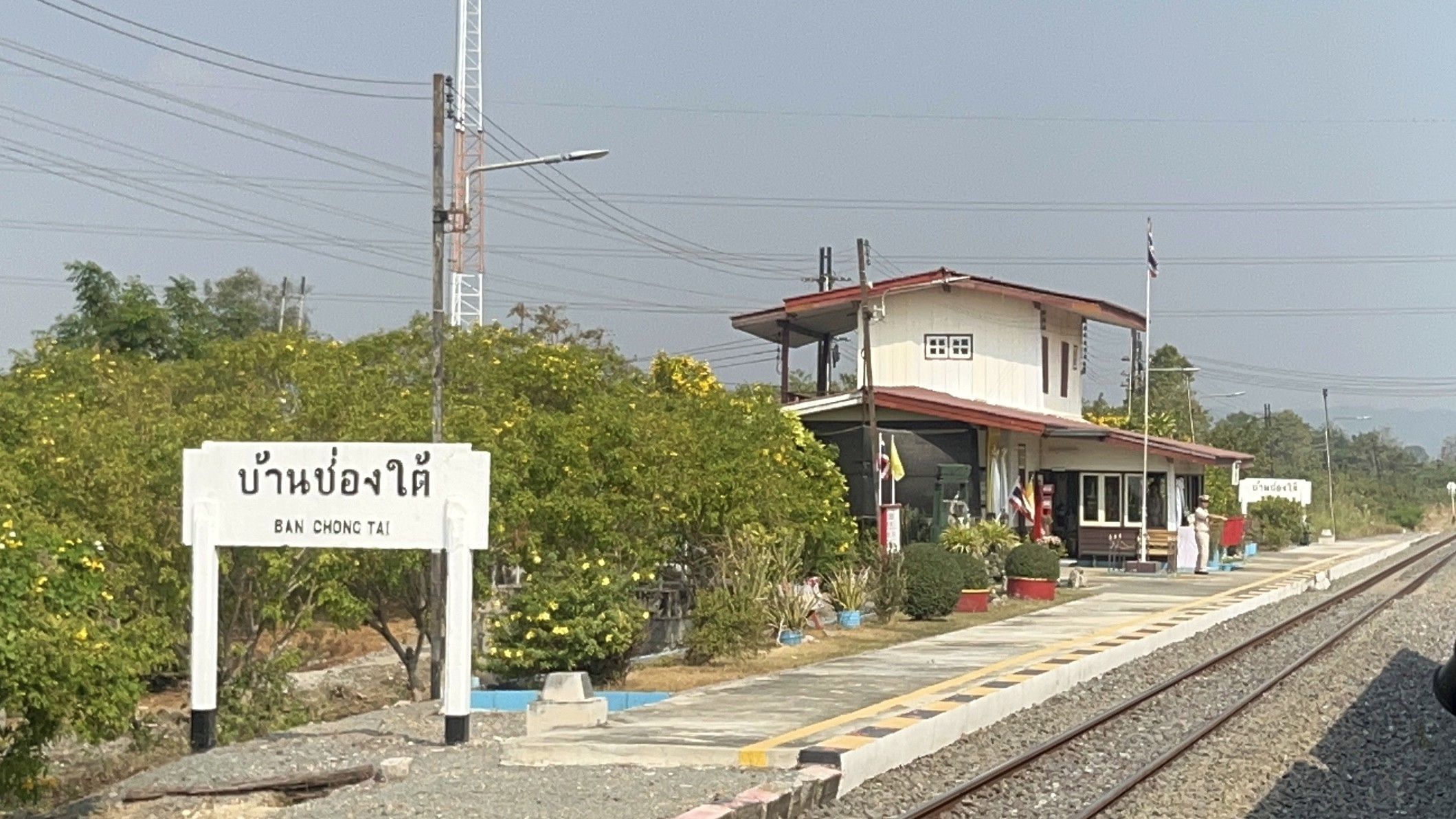
- Station in 2026

General information
- Location: Ban Pa Subdistrict, Kaeng Khoi District; Saraburi Province; Thailand
- Coordinates: 14.6152°N 101.0181°E
- Operator: State Railway of Thailand
- Line: Lam Narai Branch Line
- Distance: 128.80 km (80.0 mi) from Bangkok
- Platforms: 1
- Tracks: 21

Other information
- Station code: ชต.
- Classification: Class 3

Services
| Preceding station | State Railway of Thailand | Following station |
|---|---|---|
| Kaeng Khoi Junction Terminus | Northeastern Line Kaeng Khoi–Bua Yai Branch | Khao Khok Halt towards Bua Yai Junction |
Location

Ban Chong Tai station (Thai: สถานีบ้านช่องใต้) is a railway station located in Ban Pa Subdistrict, Kaeng Khoi District, Saraburi Province. It is a class 3 railway station located 128.80 km (80.0 mi) from Bangkok railway station. It is the location of the branch of the freight spur line to the SCG Kaeng Khoi Cement Factory.

== Gallery ==
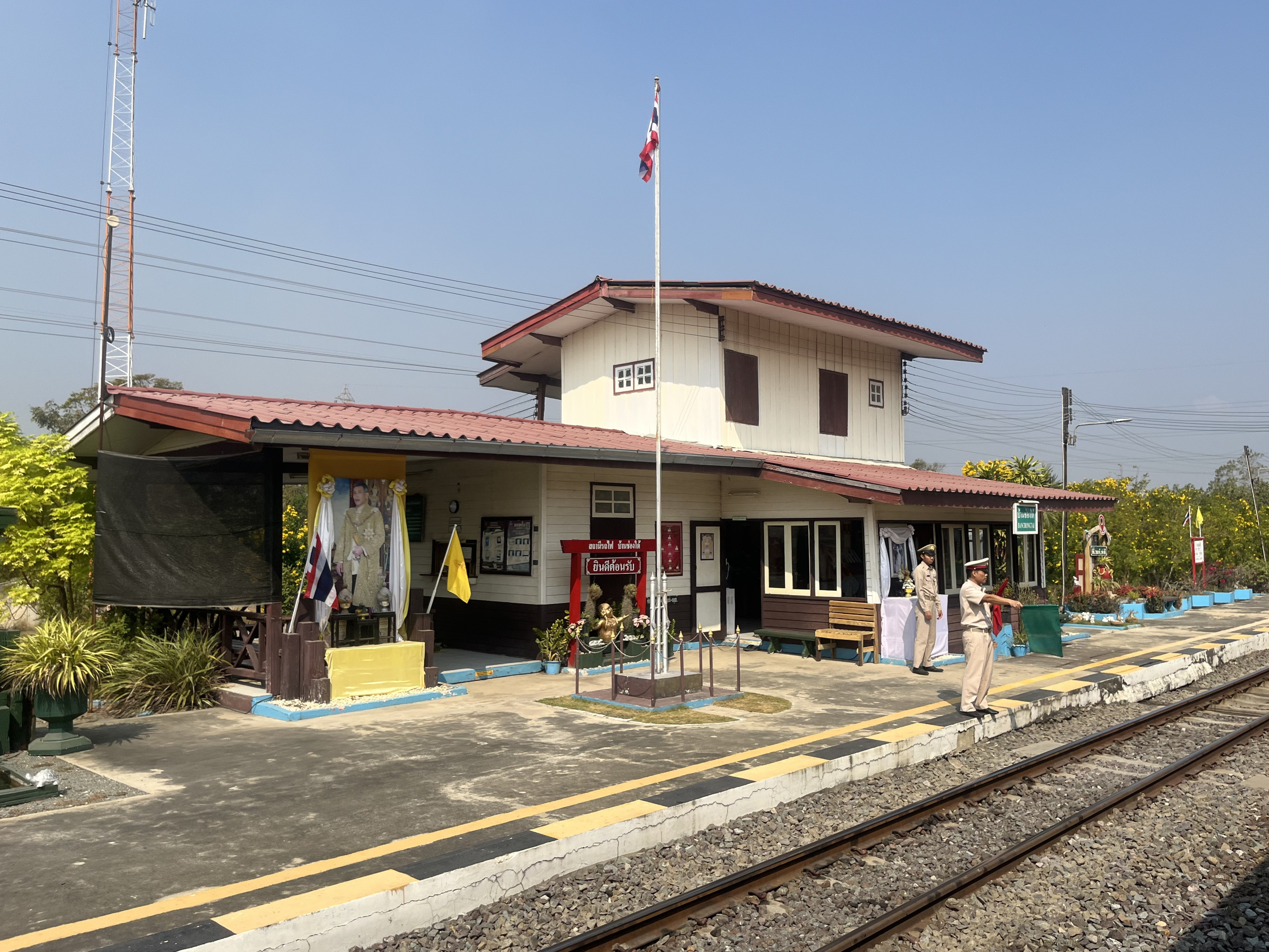
Station building
