= Wat Kaeng Khoi =

Buddhist temple in Saraburi province, Thailand

- วัดแก่งคอย
- Location within Thailand

Religion
- Affiliation: Buddhism
- District: Kaeng Khoi
- Province: Saraburi
- Region: Central Thailand
- Status: Active

Location
- Location: 318 Soi Sut Banthat 1, Sut Banthat Rd, Kaeng Khoi, Kaeng Khoi, Saraburi 18110
- Country: Thailand
- Interactive map of Wat Kaeng Khoi
- Coordinates: 14°34′23″N 101°03′42″E

Wat Kaeng Khoi (Thai: วัดแก่งคอย, pronounced [wát kɛ̀ŋ kʰɔ̄ːj]) is a Theravāda Buddhist monastery in central Thailand, located in the downtown Kaeng Khoi, Saraburi province.

== History & naming ==
Wat Kaeng Khoi was built in 1787. It had many different names, including Wat Kaeng Nang Khoi and Wat Raeng Khoi. Its official name was once Wat Jamu Samosorn, which means "temple on assembly point of the noblemen". It was eventually named Wat Kaeng Khoi, after the name of its location, Kaeng Khoi district.

The former abbot, Luang Pho La, was born in Ubon Ratchathani in Isan (northeast). He was ordained in a temple, Wat Khorthong.

== Temple components ==
There are many places of interest in the temple, such as the Phra Maha That Chedi Si Pasak (พระมหาธาตุเจดีย์ศรีป่าสัก, "the great pagoda in honour of Pa Sak"), a cetiya (pagoda) where a sacred relic of The Buddha is believed to be enshrined. People visit to worship the holy relic.

Viharn Phra Buddha Siyard Nimitr Mongkol Munee Si Kaeng Khoi (วิหารพระพุทธไสยาสน์นิมิตมงคลมุนีศรีแก่งคอย), the chapel enshrines a big reclining Buddha statue. The building was built at the same period as the Phra Maha That Chedi Si Pasak. Luang Pho La built this Buddha statue to remember his mother.

A replica of Kyaiktiyo, one of sacred pagodas in Myanmar. It is known to Thais as Phra That In Khaen (พระธาตุอินทร์แขวน). The pagoda was built on a small hill on the bank of the river Pa Sak, people like to pay their worship there. Its location also offers the Pa Sak river panoramically.

The cave of Phaya Nak, the artificial cave with many chambers and each chamber has many Phaya Nak (พญานาค, "the great divine serpant") sculptures. It is considered the highlight and unseen of the temple.

In addition to various sacred places, there are also constructions related to the local history in the temple's compound, such as the aircraft bomb monument. During World War II, the Allies bombed heavily in this area to attack Japanese troops. This was because the Japanese army had occupied the area of Kaeng Khoi as a strategic point for transporting military equipment via the railway route. The last bombing raid against Japanese forces at Kaeng Khoi occurred on April 2, 1945. After the bombings, a monument was made to remember the victims of the bombings. Beside that monument is a marble tablet with Japanese characters, built to commemorate the Japanese soldiers who died in this war. The names of all the deceased are inscribed on the monument.

In front of the two monuments, there is a model of a locomotive and art piece depicting where Kaeng Khoi was bombed.

== Location ==
Wat Kaeng Khoi is on Sut Banthat road, opposite the Kaeng Khoi market exit. It is not far from the Kaeng Khoi Junction railway station.
