= Purachatra Jayakara =

Purachatra Jayakara บุรฉัตรไชยากร
- Prince of Kamphaengphet
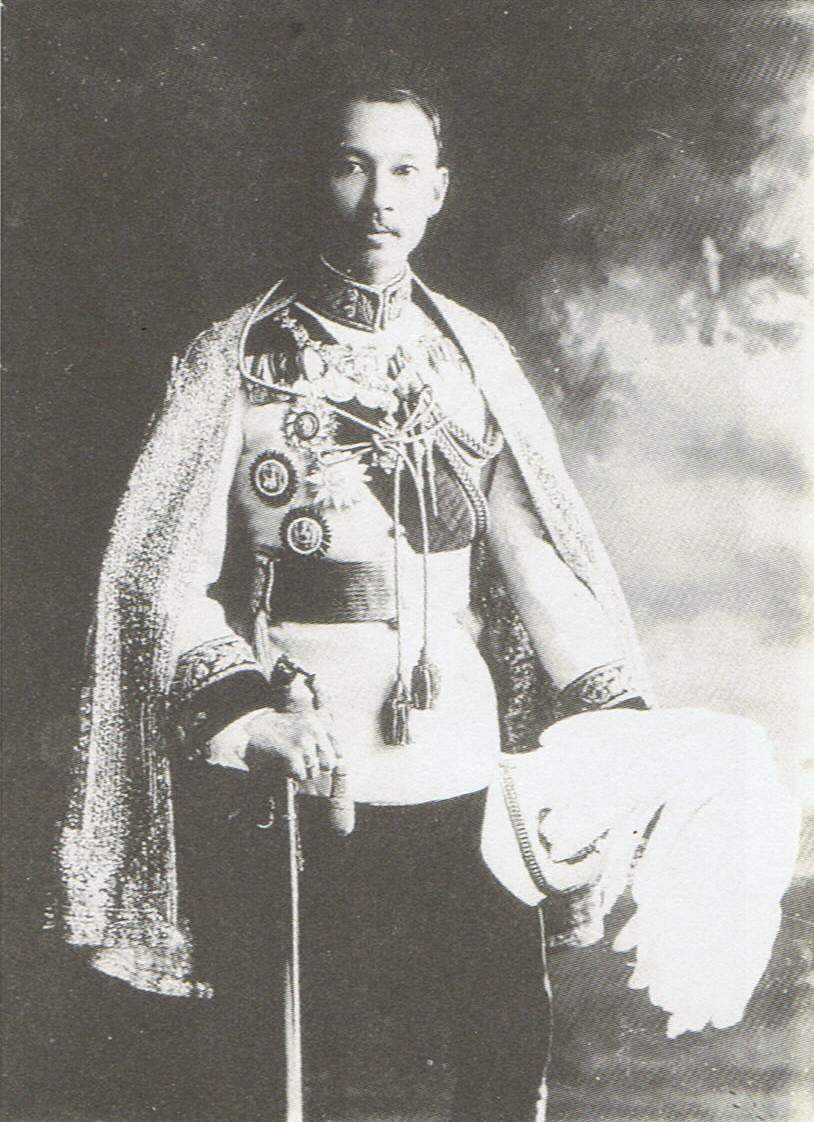
- HRH Prince of Kamphaengphet

Commander of the Royal Siamese Railway
- In office: 5 June 1917 –8 September 1928
- Predecessor: Henry Gittins as the director-general
- Successor: Sansoen Duriyang

Minister of Commerce and Transport
- In office: 15 May 1926 –29 June 1932
- Predecessor: Prince of Chanthaburi (commerce); Wongsanupraband (transport)
- Successor: Wongsanupraband (transport)

Minister of Commerce
- In office: 29 June –10 December 1932
- Predecessor: himself as transport and commerce minister
- Successor: Wongsanupraband
- Born: 23 January 1881; Grand Palace, Bangkok, Siam
- Died: 14 September 1936 (aged 55); Singapore, Straits Settlements
- Spouse: Princess Prabhavasit Narumon of Siam; Princess Ladakham of Chiang Mai and 5 other junior consorts
- Issue: see below
Names
- Purachatra Jayakara
- House: Chatrajaya family (Chakri Dynasty)
- Father: Chulalongkorn (Rama V)
- Mother: Wat

Purachatra Jayakara, Prince of Kamphaengphet (Thai: บุรฉัตรไชยากร; RTGS: Burachat Chaiyakon; 23 January 1881 – 14 September 1936) was a Prince of Siam and a member of the Siamese Royal Family (later Thailand). He founded the House of Chatrajaya (ราชสกุลฉัตรไชย); his descendants still use this royal surname. He was the son of King Chulalongkorn (Rama V the Great) of Siam. He was often called the Father of the Thai radio and the Father of the Thai railways, due to his contributions in both fields.

== Biography ==
Prince Purachatra Jayakara was born on 23 January 1881, in the compound of the Grand Palace. He was the 35th son of Chulalongkorn and Consort Wad. He began his education at Suankularb Wittayalai School, followed by attendance at Harrow School in 1894. The prince then attended the School of Engineering at Trinity College, Cambridge, and engineering at Chatham. He also studied in France and the Netherlands at the School of Engineering of digging dams and canals. After graduating, he went back to work in England. He became an officer of the Institution of Civil Engineers.

He returned to Thailand in 1904, working as a military engineer and officer of the Siamese Royal Army. He developed the Siamese Department of Engineering militaries using knowledge gained from his Western education. In 1933, he retired to Singapore with his family, residing there until his death on 14 September 1936, at the age of 55.

== Royal duties ==
=== Thai railways ===
In the reign of King Chulalongkorn. He gave the Siamese railway offices control of the foreigners, for administration in the railways system around Thailand. Until his death in 1910, starting the new reign of King Vajiravudh (Rama VI), he requested his stepbrother, Prince Purachatra Jayakara, to be the Head of the Northern railway department. Later in 1917, King Vajiravudh merged the railways of the Northern line and the Southern line into the Royal Railway department and had Prince Purachatra Jayakara as the first commander. He developed and well-administrated the railway system. He expanded the rail lines around the northern and southern territories. Moreover, he created Northeastern Line, started from Nakhon Ratchasima Province to Ubon Ratchathani Province. And Eastern Line, started from Chachoengsao Province to Sa Kaeo Province which ended at Aranyaprathet District. He purchased 2 180 horsepower diesel locomotives from Swiss Locomotive and Machine Works to use for local train around Bangkok in 1928, as the first country in Asia to do so.

Later, King Vajiravudh dissolved the road department and included into the Royal Railway Department. Prince Purachatra Jayakara was responsibility for creating all the roads and bridges around the country, such as the Kasatsuk Bridge, Ratchadaphisek Bridge in Lampang Province, Phra Buddha Yodfa Bridge and Rama VI Bridge, the first bridge to cross Chao Phraya River.

In 1921, he served as the commander of the railway department. He brought the engine of searching crude oil, firstly in Fang District, Chiang Mai Province where the people there found many amounts of crude oil. He hired the American Geologist to work as surveying in geological system, for finding crude oil and coal around Thailand.

=== Transportation and Communications ===
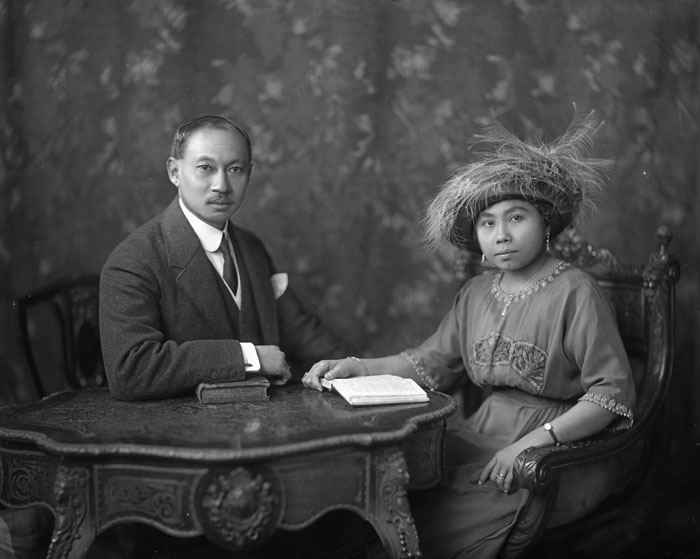
Purachatra Jayakara, Prince of Kamphaengphet and Princess Prabhavasiddh Narumala, photographed in London 2 June 1920

He was the first to bring the communication system into the country. He set up a small radio for trial broadcasting and first broadcast in 1930. He established the first radio broadcasting station called Phayathai radio station. He was the first person of Siam to establishing the communication broadcasting system in the country. Then he became the Ministry of Commerce and Transport. He considered about establishing the television broadcasting transmission, which would have made Siam the first country in Asia to experiment with television, and had contacted an American company to provide and install equipment; however, because of the Siamese Revolution of 1932, the project was cancelled. Furthermore, he created the telegraph offices around the country, for mailing services, parcel, and postal services. He created the communication services from Thailand to many foreign countries.

In the transportation systems, he interested about the flight operation systems. He demonstrated flying, later acknowledged as the first Thai people embarking. He then established the flight operation systems business aviation, including the international aviation, for commercial aviation international services.

On 1 April 1926, he became the Minister of Commerce and Transport, which were both included into the one ministry. After the Siamese Revolution, he usually did the royal duties and royal ceremonies represented his half-brother, King Prajadhipok (Rama VII), before his abdication.

== Marriage and issue ==
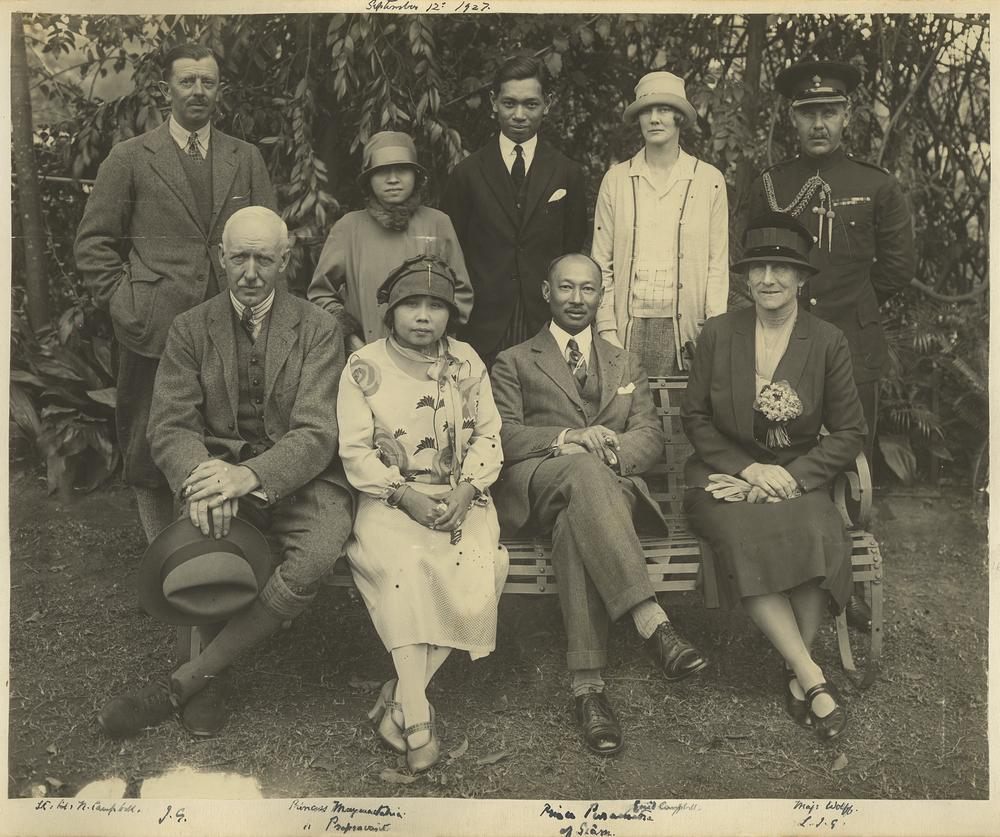
Official visit of members of the Royal Family of Thailand to Brisbane, 1927. Back row, standing, left to right: Lt. Col. Neil Campbell; Princess Mayurachatra, daughter of Prince Purachatra; private secretary to Prince Purachatra; Enid Campbell; Major Cecil Wolff. Seated left to right: Governor Sir John Goodwin; Princess Purachatra; Prince Purachatra of Siam Kambaeng Bejra, Thailand, and Lady Goodwin

Prince Purachatra Jayakara, the Prince of Kamphaengphet had 7 consorts, and 12 children; 4 sons and 8 daughters.

He firstly married on 16 November 1904 with his cousin, Princess Prabhavasit Narumon, daughter of the Chaturonrasmi, the Prince Chakrabadibongse, King Chulalongkorn's younger brother. The couple had 4 children; 1 son and 3 daughters;

- Phra Worawongse Ther Phra Ong Chao (HH Princess) Mayurachatra (7 March 1906 – 11 August 1970), married Mom Chao (HSH Prince) Sohbhana Bharadaya Svastivatana, has issue.
- Unnamed Princess (died after birth)
- Phra Worawongse Ther Phra Ong Chao (HH Prince) Prem Purachatra (12 August 1915 – 24 July 1981), married Ngamchitti Sarsas, no issue. He originated the House of Purachatra (Thai: ราชสกุลบุรฉัตร), separated from his father.
- Phra Worawongse Ther Phra Ong Chao (HH Princess) Vimolchatra (27 June 1921 – 5 December 2009), married Mom Chao (HSH Prince) Udaya Chalermlabh Vudhijaya, son of Prince Vuthichaya Chalermlabha, the Prince Singhavikrom Kriangkrai, has issue.

He secondly married with a Chiang Mai's princess, Chao Ladakham, had 2 daughters;

- Mom Chao (HSH Princess) Chatrasuda Chatrajaya (27 February 1920 – 21 May 1996), firstly married with Mom Chao (HSH Prince) Ravivanna Bairojana Rabībadhana, later relinquished the royal title after marrying secondly with Narong Wongthongsri, a businessman.
- Mom Chao (HSH Princess) Bhadaralada Chatrajaya (21 March 1924 – 29 March 2008), married Mom Chao (HSH Prince) Biriyadis Tisakula, had issue.

Mom Pian Chatrajaya na Ayudhya (née Surakup; 1 September 1899 – 14 July 1938), had 1 daughter;

- Mom Chao (HSH Princess) Kanchanachatra Chatrajaya (21 December 1921 – 20 July 1988), married Mom Chao (HSH Prince) Prasomsuksavasdi Sukhasvasti, had issue.

Mom Pued Chatrajaya na Ayudhaya (née Pheungrakwong; 12 June 1906 – 5 March 1984), had 1 son;

- Mom Chao (HSH Prince) Surachatra Chatrajaya (15 June 1929 – 27 August 1993), married firstly with Rajda Israsena na Ayudhya, and secondly with Mom Rajawongse Ruengrambai Jumbala, had issue.

Mom Buaphud Chatrajaya na Ayudhya (née Intrasut; born 5 April 1911), had 1 son and 1 daughter;

- Mom Chao (HSH Princess) Fuengchatra Chatrajaya (9 May 1932 – 8 July 2004), married Mom Rajawongse Bibadhanadis Tisakula, had issue
- Mom Chao (HSH Prince) Bipulchatra Chatrajaya (12 September 1935 – 31 May 1956)

Mom Chamlong Chatrajaya na Ayudhya (née Chalanukroh; 8 September 1913 – 4 November 1968), had 1 daughter;

- Mom Chao (HSH Princess) Hiranyachatra Chatrajaya (20 October 1933 – 19 October 1998, relinquished the royal title after marrying Alfred Fitting, and secondly with Bevan Edwards, had issue.

Mom Euam Chatrajaya na Ayudhya (née Aruntat; 14 October 1910 – 16 February 1948), had 1 son;

- Mom Chao (HSH Prince) Dibyachatra Chatrajaya (6 October 1934 – 13 January 2010), married Charusri Ratanawaraha, Mandhana Bunnag, and Orasri Leenawat, has issue.

== Ancestry ==
Ancestors of Prince Purachatra Jayakara, Krom Phra Kamphaengphet Akarayothin
Prince Purachatra Jayakara, the Prince of Kamphaengphet	Father: Chulalongkorn, King Rama V of Siam	Paternal Grandfather: Mongkut, King Rama IV of Siam	Paternal Great-grandfather: Buddha Loetla Nabhalai, King Rama II of Siam
Prince Purachatra Jayakara, the Prince of Kamphaengphet	Father: Chulalongkorn, King Rama V of Siam	Paternal Grandfather: Mongkut, King Rama IV of Siam	Paternal Great-grandmother: Queen Sri Suriyendra
Prince Purachatra Jayakara, the Prince of Kamphaengphet	Father: Chulalongkorn, King Rama V of Siam	Paternal Grandmother: Queen Debsirindra	Paternal Great-grandfather: Prince Sirivongse, the Prince Matayabidaksa
Prince Purachatra Jayakara, the Prince of Kamphaengphet	Father: Chulalongkorn, King Rama V of Siam	Paternal Grandmother: Queen Debsirindra	Paternal Great-grandmother: Mom Noi Sirivongs na Ayudhya
Prince Purachatra Jayakara, the Prince of Kamphaengphet	Mother: Wat	Maternal Grandfather: Lord Sathiarnraksa	Maternal Great-grandfather: unknown
Prince Purachatra Jayakara, the Prince of Kamphaengphet	Mother: Wat	Maternal Grandfather: Lord Sathiarnraksa	Maternal Great-grandmother: unknown
Prince Purachatra Jayakara, the Prince of Kamphaengphet	Mother: Wat	Maternal Grandmother: Prik	Maternal Great-grandfather: Phraya Isranubhab
Prince Purachatra Jayakara, the Prince of Kamphaengphet	Mother: Wat	Maternal Grandmother: Prik	Maternal Great-grandmother: Kham Kalyanamitra
