= Pha Sadet railway station =

Railway station in Thailand

Coordinates: 14.6445813°N 101.1007404°E

Pha Sadet ผาเสด็จ

General information
- Location: Moo 5, Thap Kwang Subdistrict, Kaeng Khoi District, Saraburi Province
- Owner: State Railway of Thailand (SRT)
- Manager: Ministry of Transport
- Line: Ubon Ratchathani Main Line
- Platforms: 1
- Tracks: 2

Construction
- Structure type: At-grade

Other information
- Station code: ผด.
- Classification: Class 3

History
- Closed: 16 December 2024

Services
Preceding station	State Railway of Thailand	Following station
Map Kabao towards Hua Lamphong or Krung Thep Aphiwat	Northeastern Line	Hin Lap towards Ubon Ratchathani or Khamsavath (Laos)
Location

Pha Sadet railway station (Thai: สถานีรถไฟผาเสด็จ) was a railway station in the area of Thap Kwang Subdistrict, Kaeng Khoi District, Saraburi Province, Thailand. It was a class 3 railway station located 138.95 km (86.3 mi) from Bangkok railway station (Hua Lamphong railway station).

== History ==
Pha Sadet railway station is a historic place, since it is the first railway line in Thailand, the northeastern railway line that has been built since 1892 and was completed in 1900 with a distance from Bangkok to Korat (Nakhon Ratchasima).

Pha Sadet is a distinctive cliff with an overhanging rock to the tracks lied 50 m (164.0 ft) southwestern of the station. It is the place where King Chulalongkorn (Rama V) and Queen Saovabha Phongsri came when the King opened the Bangkok-Nakhon Ratchasima railway line in 1895 and inscribed the King's Thai monogram on this cliff, "Chor Por Ror" (จ.ป.ร.). Hence the name "Pha Sadet", which means "the cliff visited by king".

The location of the cliff and the station can be considered as the entrance to the Khao Yai grand jungle, where it is referred to as "Dong Phaya Yen" (formerly known as "Dong Phaya Fai").

As part of the double tracking project, a new railway line between Map Kabao and Muak Lek was constructed to bypass the mountainous curved route through the Dong Phaya Yen forest, of which includes Pha Sadet and Hin Lap railway stations. The line initially opened for passenger services on 28 July 2024. However, after the passage of three trains through the Pha Sadet and Hin Lap tunnels, reports of significant dust and particulate remnants from the construction blowing into the open-air carriages, prompting SRT to temporarily suspend railway services for a cleanup of the railway line. The line reopened on 16 December 2024, resulting in the cessation of passenger services at Pha Sadet and Hin Lap railway stations on the same day. The line remains open for freight services to the TPI Polene cement factory at Hin Lap.
