= Boworadet Rebellion =

Attempted coup in Siam (1933)

Boworadet rebellion
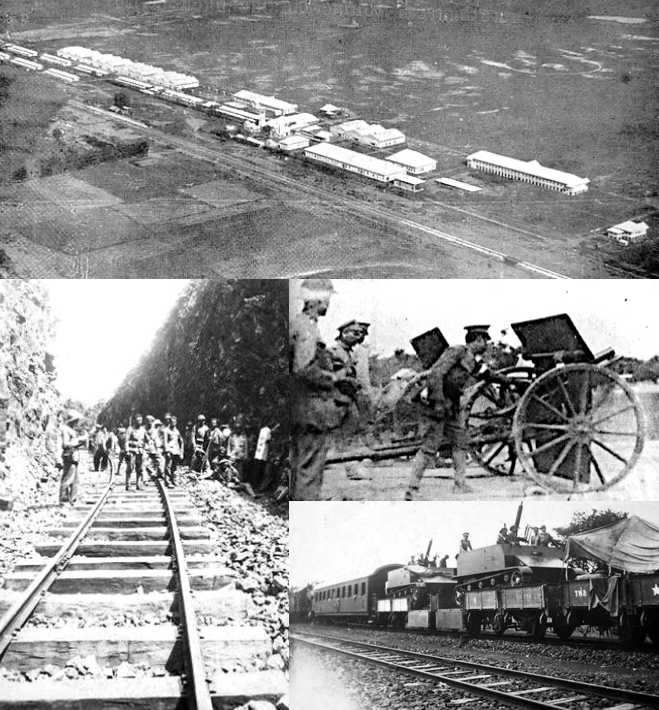
- (clockwise from top): Don Mueang railway station and airfield.; Government's troops firing cannons from Pradiphat Road in North Bangkok.; Government's military train.; KM143.6 where Sri Sitthisongkhram was killed.
| Date | 11–25 October 1933 |
| Location | Central Thailand, Nakhon Ratchasima, Lak Si and Ratchaburi |
| Result | Decisive win for the Khana Ratsadon |

Belligerents
| Khana Ratsadon Royal Thai Army (rest) | National Salvation Group ~ 7,000 |

Commanders and leaders
| Luang Phibunsongkhram; Phra Sitthirueangdetpol; Luang Amnuaisongkhram † | Boworadet; Phraya Si Sitthisongkhram †; Phraya Senasongkhram; Phraya Thepsongkhram |

Casualties and losses
| 17 killed | Death unknown but heavy; 6 capital punishment; 244 life imprisonment |

The Boworadet rebellion (Thai: กบฏบวรเดช; RTGS: kabot boworadet; [kà.bòt.bɔ̄ː.wɔ̄ː.rá.dèt]) was a 1933 Thai rebellion (or unsuccessful coup d'état) led by royalist Prince Boworadet, as a result of the conflicts between the previous royalist regime (those loyal to Chakri dynasty rule and King Prajadhipok) and the succeeding constitutional regime led by Khana Ratsadon ('People's Party'), following the Revolution of 1932. The Boworadet rebellion was eventually defeated by the Siamese Government.

== Background ==
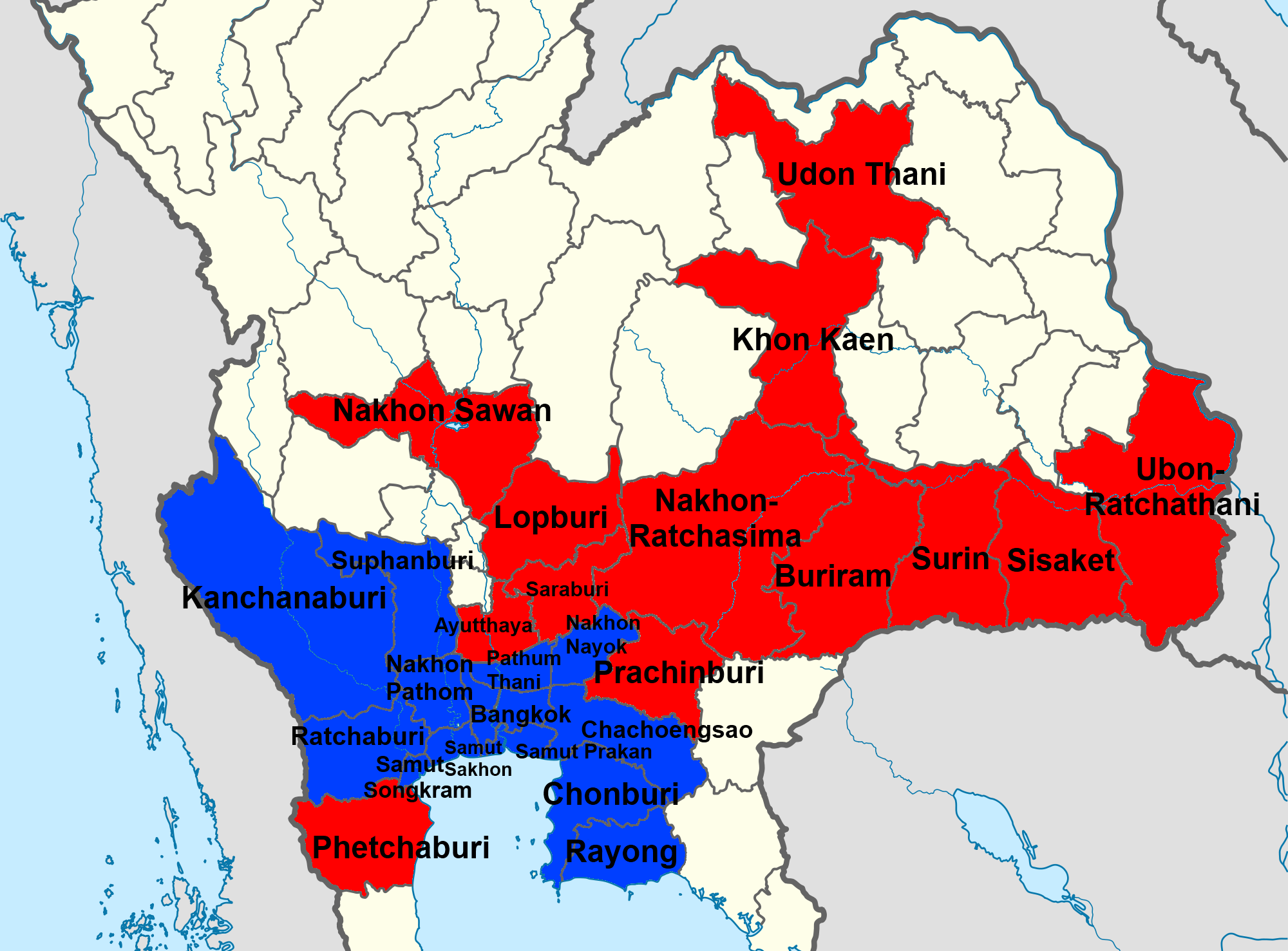
Thailand map of 1933, showing provincial loyalties. Provinces supporting Boworadet Provinces loyal to the government

On 24 June 1932, the People's Party overthrew absolute monarchy in Siam, a turning point in 20th century Thai history. After the establishment of the new regime, a series of counter-revolutionary crises threatened the new, constitutional government. The king accepted the new constitution as a temporary one, and took part in crafting a "permanent" constitution. Conservative Phraya Manopakorn Nitithada, or Mano was appointed prime minister. He later showed royalist tendencies.

In March 1933, Pridi Banomyong, a Minister of State and a member of the People's Party, was attacked verbally by the constitutional monarch King Prajadhipok (King Rama VII) as a communist following Pridi's submission of the Draft National Economic Development Plan, or the "Yellow Cover Dossier", to the National Assembly. The Yellow Dossier was a plan to arrange and provide state welfare, to distribute all land to the rural poor, to intervene in private sector economic affairs, and to provide farmers more economic subsidies. These concepts were deemed communistic (or at least socialistic) by Prajadhipok. This led Thawan Ritthidet (Thai: ถวัลย์ ฤทธิเดช), a private citizen, to file a lawsuit against the king, accusing him of intervention in political, state, and economic affairs. The fallout over Pridi's plan divided the cabinet. Mano took advantage of conflicts in the People's Party to win the support of those opposed to reform in the executive. After securing King Prajadhipok's signature on a decree, he carried out a silent coup to dissolve the National Assembly on 1 April 1933, and used emergency decrees (such as the Anti-Communist Act) to govern. Pridi was immediately exiled to France.

On 20 June 1933, a senior army officer and member of the People's Party, Colonel Lord Phahon, seized power in the 1933 Siamese coup d'état, overthrowing the government of Manopakorn. Phahon appointed himself the second Prime Minister of Thailand, declared that Pridi was not guilty, and invited him to return to Thailand.

The counter-revolutionary rebellion that ensued, led by National Salvation Group (คณะกู้บ้านเมือง) under Prince Boworadet and other royalty, is often regarded as another royalist attempt to undermine the People's Party and its revolutionary government, because major participants had relations with royal family. The rebels' chief motive declared in an ultimatum was their concern that Phahon and Pridi had "encouraged the people to despise the King Prajadhipok..." Others have argued that it was not only an organized royalist rebellion, but was headed by King Prajadhipok. The rebellion accused Pridi of communism and proclaimed that its armed struggle against the government was intended to establish real democracy in Siam. The government saw the rebellion as fueled by Boworadet's personal ambitions.

== Leaders of the rebellion ==
=== Prince Boworadet ===
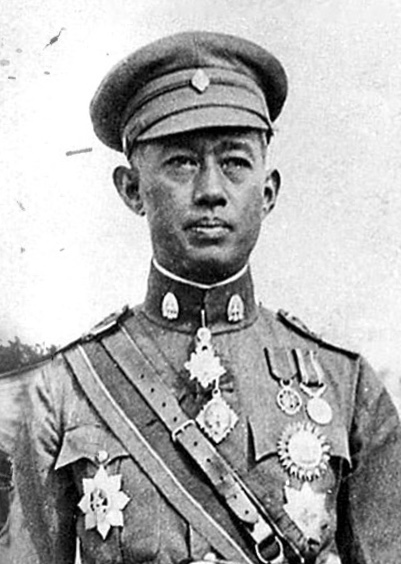
Prince Boworadet, leader of National Salvation Group

The Special Court's "Decision on the Insurrection" noted that Prince Boworadet had once consulted General Phahon and Phaya Srisith about the plan to change the government. Because of the prince's reluctance to use force to overthrow the government, the Promoters carried out the revolution without the prince's participation. He then expected Phahon to invite him to be prime minister. Pridi rejected Phahon's recommendation and named Mano as prime minister instead of the prince. Boworadet was then at odds with the Promoters. An ardent royalist, he was furious that anyone was allowed to sue the king. This added to his displeasure at Phahon's coup against Manopakorn and Phahon's support of Pridi against the monarch.

At the end of July, Phibun and Supha sent a circular to a number of prominent individuals warning them to "exercise peace of mind", otherwise the "party will be forced to bring stringent measures to bear on you." A number of members of the royal house received the letter, including Prince Boworadet, who was in Hua Hin with the king at that time. The combined catalysts of the warning and Pridi's return stirred Prince Boworadet to seek revenge on the Promoters.

Prince Boworadet plotted with Colonel Phraya Si Sitthisongkhram (Thai: พระยาศรีสิทธิ์สงคราม), the commander of the military in Bangkok, to stage a coup d'état to unseat the Phahon government and replace it with a more traditional one.

=== Colonel Sri Sitthisongkhram ===
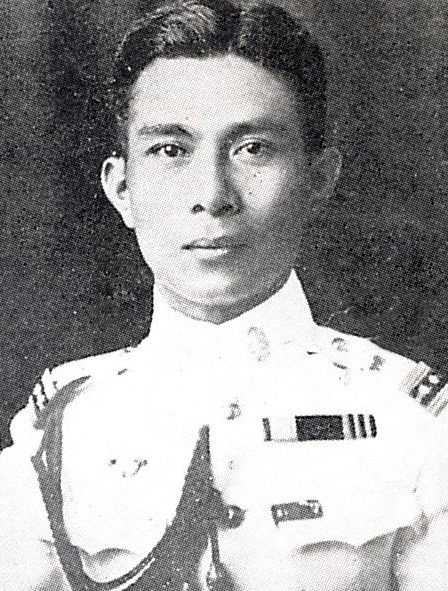
Phraya Sri Sithsongkram

Another prominent counter-revolutionary leader was Phraya Si Sitthisongkhram, a former close friend of Phaya Phohon and Phaya Song. He received his military education in Germany. Like Prince Boworadet, he also refused to join the 1932 revolution, but he anticipated his revolutionary friends would appoint him to an important position in the new regime as his educational background and stature among army officers would help the Promoters in strengthening the revolution. Much to his disappointment, he only got a minor position in the Ministry of Education. Later, he was appointed to the State Council and to replace Phya Song as the Directory of Military Operations after the four military leaders were expelled by the coup carried out by Mano. However, the second coup soon took over Mano government, and Phaya Srisith subsequently became the bitter enemy of the new government. In the rebellion, he was assigned as Borowadet's deputy and given the task of inciting the Ayutthaya garrison.

=== Major General Sena Songgram ===
A member of the royal family who had commanded the First Army Corps before the revolution, Sena Songgram was the only high-ranking officer who lost power on the first day of the revolution when a group of revolutionaries attempted to arrest him. As early as January 1933, he had tried to form an opposition, royalist party, the National Party. He harbored strong animosity against the promoters of the revolution, and he subsequently became a counter-revolutionary leader whose task was to incite the troops in the northern provinces.

== The rebellion ==
=== The rebellion breaks out ===
Early in October 1933, Prince Boworadet appeared in Korat to mobilize the army to rebel. He soon took complete control of Korat and got positive responses from other provinces. The central government had sensed the political storms in the provinces, but was trapped by the antagonistic elements in Bangkok. Bangkok started military preparations for the upcoming insurrection. Businesses and organizations offered money and volunteer services to help the defense. On 11 October 1933, under the leadership of Prince Boworadet, a full-scale rebellion broke out at the provincial garrison in Korat. The garrisons of Nakhon Ratchasima, Ubon Ratchathani, Prachinburi, Saraburi, Ayutthaya, Nakhon Sawan, and Phetburi, one after another, declared themselves in favor of the rebellion against the Bangkok government. They issued their first ultimatum calling on the government to resign immediately or be removed by force on the same day. The government in Bangkok refused to comply with their demands. The first clash occurred on 11 October 1933 in Pak Chong District, in Nakhon Ratchasima Province. Government forces were defeated and several members of the government were captured.

On 12 October, troops from the northeast of the country marched on Bangkok, seized Don Mueang Aerodrome, and entered the northern suburbs, occupied the area around Bang Khen. The rebels consisting of the Korat, Phetchaburi, and Udon Regiments, together with a cavalry unit and several artillery batteries set up a stronghold near the Lak Si train station, using machine guns and cavalry. They called themselves the "National Salvation Group" (Thai: คณะกู้บ้านเมือง; RTGS: Khana Ku Ban Mueang) and their attempt the "Siege Deer Plan" (Thai: แผนล้อมกวาง; RTGS: Phaen Lom Kwang).

=== Stalemate ===
Boworadet probably hoped that at least some Bangkok army units would join him and the king would show his preference by remaining strictly neutral and non-committal. The rebels aimed to bring nine upcountry garrisons to besiege the city, but only three moved to the city's northern outskirts while the others hesitated or were repelled by pro-government garrisons. Boworadet tried to persuade other forces to join him, including the Royal Thai Navy, which instead declared itself neutral. The commander-in-chief of the navy withdrew his battleships from the capital and sailed to ports in the south.

The rapid advance of the rebel army, the seizure of Don Mueang airport, and the withdrawal of the navy struck panic into the government. Even more discouraging was that in the face of the royalist counter-revolution, the Promoters themselves were not unified. Some members of Colonel Phraya Songsuradet's senior military clique showed their reluctance to fight the rebels, and Songsuradet and Colonel Phra Prasas themselves left the country a few days before the rebellion and refused to return. For thirty hours Phahon tried to negotiate a peaceful resolution.

Neither side wanted a shooting war, and most of the salvoes were propaganda. The People's Party put out radio broadcasts and leaflets damning the Boworadet forces as "rebels" and "bandits". In reply, the besiegers dropped leaflets on the city from aeroplanes, accusing the People's Party of restraining the king.

Major Luang Seri Somroeng Rit (Thai: พันตรีหลวงเสรีเริงฤทธิ์) was appointed (under truce) to ask the rebels to surrender, under a government offer of amnesty. He was seized and made a hostage.

Faced with the prospect of a full-scale battle to remove the existing leadership, Boworadet adopted a more conciliatory approach by entering into negotiations in which he called on the government to allow the king a greater political role. On 13 October, Boworadet sent another ultimatum to the government. The rebel leaders backed down from their original demand for the government to resign as troops in the provinces they counted on failed to march on Bangkok and all the units in Bangkok remained loyal to the government. The second ultimatum presented the following demands:

1. The country shall be headed by the king forever
2. All state affairs must be carried out in accordance with the Constitution, especially the appointment and removal of members of the Council of Ministers, which can only be effected by a majority of votes
3. Permanent public officials, both civil and military, shall not intervene in politics
4. The appointment of public officials shall be made with regard to qualifications, without political partiality
5. The second type (non-elected) of the people's representatives shall be appointed by the king, not the prime minister
6. Armaments for the Army shall be provided everywhere, not gathered in any specific area
7. Amnesty shall be granted to the National Rescue Council and all its supporters

With the situation turning in the government's favor, the government was unwilling to compromise with the insurgents. Phahon, in a radio speech, revealed the king's telegram expressing his regret for the rebels' action to appeal for popular support, which got a warm response.

=== Critical battle at Bangkok ===
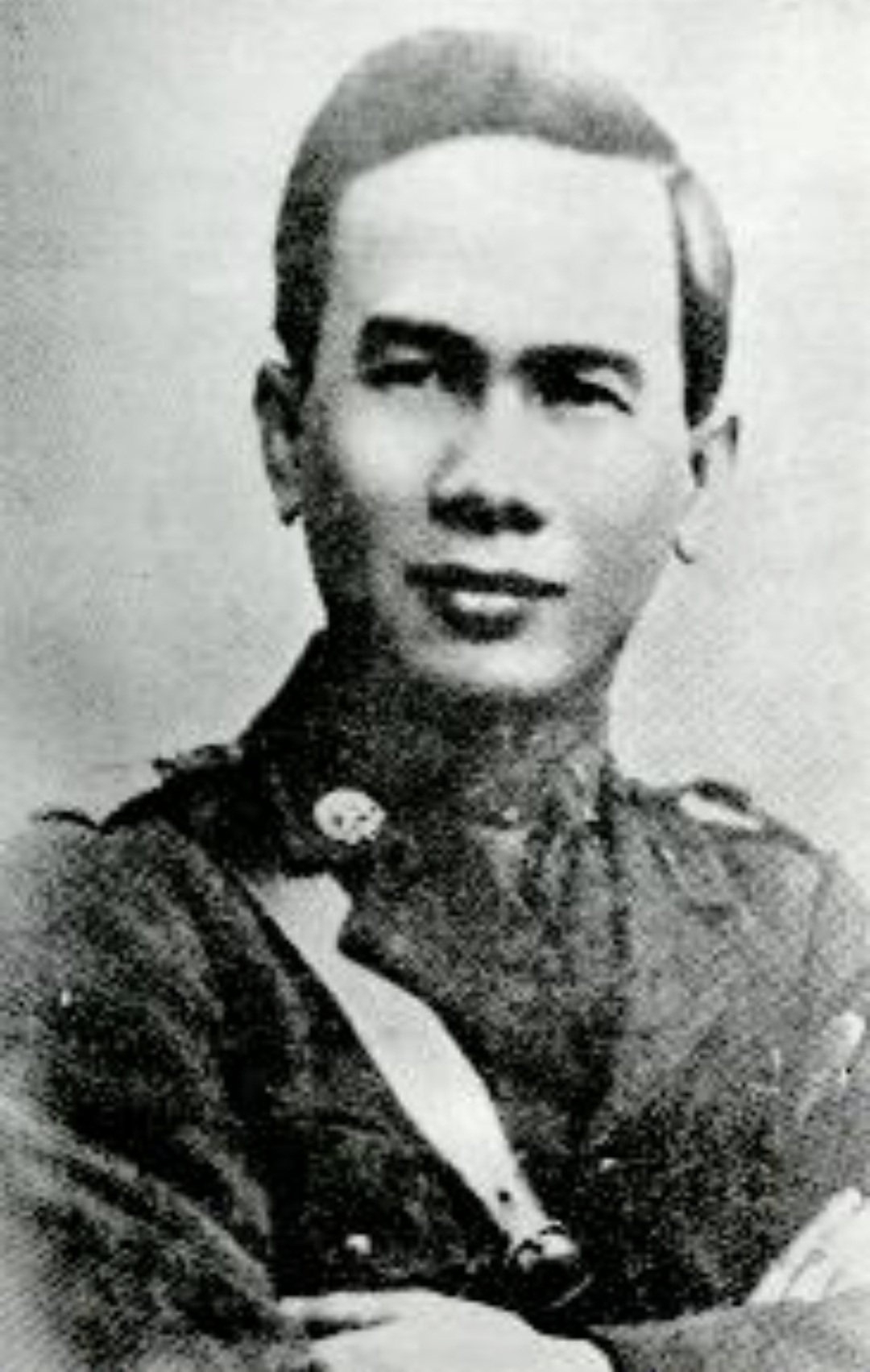
Lieutenant Colonel Phibunsongkhram, Commander of Government forces

The government appointed Lieutenant Colonel Plaek Pibulsonggram (Phibun), one of the 1932 coup makers, to command the Bangkok forces and put down the rebellion. On 13 October, Phibun launched a counterattack. He directed an artillery bombardment of rebel positions. Phibun's artillery was better supplied than the rebel forces. The government was supported in non-combat roles by Boy Scouts, students, and labourers. For the next three days the two opposing parties shelled each other, causing many casualties and great damage. Artillery was augmented by an armoured car and a tank force commanded by Phibun's friend, Lieutenant Colonel 'Luang Amnuai Songkhram (Thom Kesakomon) (Thai: หลวงอำนวยสงคราม (ถม เกษะโกมล)), who would later be killed in combat. The government was able to drive back the rebels with the help of the Nakhon Sawan Regiment and a declaration of the Prachinburi Regiment in support of the government. This broke the rebels' morale, and on 14 October they began to retreat. On 16 October, government forces recaptured Don Mueang Airport on the outskirts of the city and drove the rebel troops back along the northeastern railway line. Much destruction was done to the infrastructure of Bangkok (railways and bridges) and the surrounding area, including the Don Mueang Aerodrome, from artillery bombardment, bombing, and fire.

Desperate to escape, the rebels sent an empty locomotive down the track at high speed to collide with a government troop train. The resulting crash killed a number of government soldiers and gave the rebels time to reach their base in Korat. The government, with superior forces and artillery moved in by rail, attacked the rebel stronghold. Running out of ammunition and supplies, the rebels broke. Government forces pursued and advanced to the rebel base in Nakhon Ratchasima. By the end of the October, the rebellion finally wound down in the provinces with the possibility of further reinforcement by other provincial garrisons. On 23 October, government forces defeated rebel forces at Hin Lap. Boworadet's second-in-command, Sri Sitthi Songkram, died in the battle.

=== Defeat of the rebellion ===
By the end of October 1933, rebel remnants dispersed, and the royalist rebellion was over. The government broadcast a radio appeal to rebel troops to surrender and offered a ten thousand baht reward for the capture of Boworadet. On 25 October Boworadet and his wife boarded an aeroplane and left Siam for Vietnam, (then part of French Indochina). When the news of his escape was known, Phya Sena Songgram and other important leaders, now approaching Burirum Province, became disheartened and fled. Twenty-two officers managed to flee the country and find asylum in French Indo-China.

Most of the rebel forces surrendered and were granted amnesty except for important rebel leaders. Twenty-three had been killed in action. The People's Party arrested the stragglers and eventually jailed 230 people including Boworadet's younger brother, Prince Sinthiphorn Kadakorn (Thai: หม่อมเจ้าสิทธิพร กฤดากร). Two retired senior military officers were tried and executed. A royal prince was sentenced to life imprisonment. These later were sentenced to death, but later all the sentences were commuted, and no executions took place. Most sentences were later reduced and many were pardoned.

Boworadet sought asylum in Cambodia, where he lived until 1948. He then returned home to Thailand, dying in 1953 at the age of 76.

== The king's role in the rebellion ==
King Prajadhipok's role in the Boworadet Rebellion is controversial. Some historians do not note the king's role in the rebellion other than mention the neutral standpoint he took at the beginning of the rebellion and the regret he expressed when the rebellion was quelled. Others took a more sympathetic view of King Prajadhipok's predicament during the rebellion.

=== Monarchical view ===
Boworadet's motives remain obscure even though the rebellion was generally regarded as royalist and reactionary. Boworadet was regarded as having strained relations with several of the highest members of the royal family including Princes Boriphat and Purachatra. Nonetheless, before the 1932 revolution, he had been in contact with the Promoters and had been considered as a possible leader of the plot against the absolute monarchy. Benjamin Baston indicates that the king did not enjoy a good relationship with Prince Boworadet as he was suspected of participating in overthrowing King Prajadhipok's regime. Some scholars listed the king's letter to the British officials Sir R. Holland and Baxter as evidence that the king had foreseen the rebellion ahead. However, more details about the letter provided by historian Kobkua Suwannathat-Pian showed that the king had been well aware that the rebellion would not galvanize the people. If he really had been so sensible before the rebellion, it would less possible for him to lead the rebellion.

There were two movements, one within and one outside Bangkok. The former was a representative of the genuine discontent with the People's Party and would therefore have won, had it not been hampered by the latter led by Prince Boworadet, 'No movement' emphasized the king, 'which had for its apparent object the restoration of the old regime could possibly succeed.

Even though King Prajadhipok declined the government's request to return to Bangkok, he offered five times to end the armed struggle, but all were met with silence from the government. It was evident that the Phahon government was in no mood to accept any role offered by the monarch as long as the king refused to return to the capital and support the government. The king's explanation for his escape to the south was that he tried to evade capture by the approaching pro-rebel soldiers. His intention was to remain a free agent and to strengthen his hand as an impartial party to whom both sides could look for a solution.

=== Anti-monarchical view ===
Baston suggests that Boworadet fell out with the king after his resignation. Other evidence counters this speculation. The prince remained on the best of terms with Prajadhipok who gave him a new house a few months after his resignation. Following the overthrow of the absolute monarchy, Boworadet regularly spent time in the company of the king. They happened to be together when the second coup happened and when Phibun issued his circular. More evidence was the king's letter to Baxter, his former adviser in England, at the beginning of August. He made it clear that for any action against the government to be "effective", he would have to "retire to some safe place and await events". The king and queen's scheduled departure from their Hua Hin palace on 5 October was postponed indefinitely. Even though no concrete conclusion of the king's involvement can be made from these indications, suspicions were raised that the king was informed of the timetable of the rebellion.

Another revisionist view provided by political scientist Nattapoll Chaiching is that Prajadhipok was the head of the anti-government conspiracy. Based on a report of the special court of 1939 and eyewitness's memoirs, Nattapoll argues that King Prajadhipok established a large anti-revolutionary underground network consisting of the royal family, secret agents, assassins, military officers, civil servants and journalists—all of them loyal to the old regime. He defended the validity of the sources writing that royalist witnesses are more likely to tell the truth as the political atmosphere now in Thailand favors highlights of the former king's role in bringing down the revolutionaries. According to him, the Boworadet rebellion received the full support of King Prajadhipok and the royalists and was plotted by them. Prince Boworadet was asked to be the commander of the rebel armies. King Prajadhipok made a personal donation of 200,000 baht, and mandated the combined army infantry units from the northeast should be the rebels' principal troops. Two months before the rebellion, the royalist propaganda published articles in Bangkok media attacking the People's Party to rally the public's support for the rebellion.

Before the rebellion broke out, King Prajadhipok began to strengthen the guard of Klai Kangwon Palace in Hua Hin by ordering machine guns and reinforcement troops where he resided after the 1932 revolution. He also prepared an emergency escape route. Nattapoll interpreted the king's departure from Klai Kangwon Palace to the south as Prajadhipok awaiting news of success in the south according to the plan. The special court of 1939 accused royalists of trying to assassinate the People's Party leadership. Memoirs of His Majesty's secret agent uncovered an attempt to assassinate the leader of the People's Party by snipers hired by royalists prior to the start of the rebellion. Rebellion was not the only method they used to undermine the government, but it was the last resort.

Once in England, the king began negotiations with the government. He objected to the government's treatment of the Boworadet rebels. He made four demands on the government. One of them was amnesty for those imprisoned for political offenses. Were the demand not met, he threatened to abdicate. The government rejected his demand. As the penal code of the time required written royal consent before executions could take place, the king delayed signing death warrants, thus preventing executions from taking place.

=== Middle view ===
A more middle analysis of the evidence is provided by political scientist Federico Ferrara. Ferrara pointed out the king's ambiguous behavior and some disputed explanations. Even though Boworadet had a difficult relationship with the king and other princes, it is hard to deny the royalist credentials of some of Boworadet's lieutenants. Both sides justified their military actions by vowing their loyalty to the king, as the rebels alleged that the government "disrespected" the king and the government declared that their resistance was to protect the king. Although the king declared neutrality, he did not return to Bangkok as Phraya Phahon requested. Instead he escaped to the south. King Prajadhipok and the queen moved to Songkhla, near the Malaysian border. The move prompted many interpretations. Some thought it was to escape seizure by either side. A foreign observer provided various explanations:

Some said he had gone further south to raise support for Bavoradej [Boworadet]. Others said that he had fled south for fear of being taken into custody by the revolutionary [government] party and held as a hostage against Bavoradej. Some said he was out of sympathy with the rebellion and that he wished to disassociate himself from it entirely.

King Prajadhipok's position was very much weakened. He was suspected by the government to be conniving with rebels; he was criticized by many royalists for not coming to the assistance of the rebels who were fighting his political battle for him; and he was "openly" criticized for alleged weakness in "running away" to Songkhla.

In general, all parties believed that the support of the throne would ensure quick success for its side, thus there would be no bloodshed or misinterpretation of the king's will. According to Kobkua Suwannathat-Pian, the king could have played a more positive and effective role in helping to end the conflict. His indecisiveness and passivity throughout the crisis were blamed for the large number of casualties. Shortly thereafter, the king's private secretary issued a statement that expressed His Majesty's regret over the "suffering caused by the civil war" and announced a donation of 10,000 baht to the Red Cross. Prajadhipok reportedly also secretly funded the rebellion with a sum 20 times larger than the Red Cross donation, a charge some consider questionable.

== Legacy ==
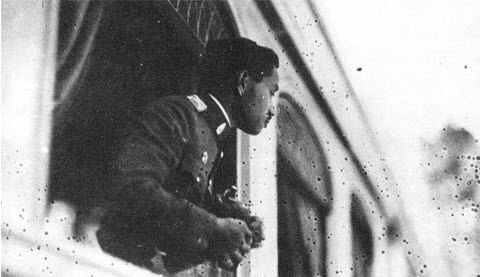
King Prajadhipok (Rama VII) leaving Siam by train

=== Setback for royalty ===
Phahon's government was able to further cement their grip on power as a result of the Rebellion. Although there are controversies about King Prajadhipok's role in the rebellion, the result was a blow to royalist and conservative power, as the rebels had claimed to be fighting in his name. His prestige was diminished, and his power weakened. The king's perceived lack of leadership and indecisiveness was demonstrated when he released a telegram saying that he regretted the strife and civil disturbances of the rebellion. The king and queen then left the capital for Songkhla, leaving the government to deal with the rebellion. His failure to support the constitutional government undermined his credibility and his perceived commitment to democracy and the constitutional system. This allowed Phahon and the king's opponents to claim that the monarch had failed to do his duty. A series of events following the rebellion eventually leading to the king's abdication in 1935. The rebellion also led to the estrangement of aristocratic factions and families, who had served the kingdom for centuries. They were viewed by the government with distrust and were slow to regain their former power and position in Thai politics.

=== The beginning of military rule ===
The Promoters had crushed the counter-revolution at the expense of the revolution's democratic potential. The Promoters relied on a host of non-democratic measures to stave off the royalist challenge to the constitutional regime and in the immediate aftermath placed Siam on a track to military dictatorship. The government could then arrest dissents using the excuse of their involvement in conspiracies against the government. The press was controlled and the "Act to Protect the Constitution" criminalised public expressions of disrespect for the constitution or the constitutional regime.

Pridi and his economic plan might have been one of the reasons for the turmoil. The accusations casting him as a communist, the divisions of the People's Party, and the first coup along with the rebellion diminished his power. The liberal and socialist civilian faction was weakened. Phahon's supporters won a clear mandate in the national elections and built a single-minded government party.

The rebellion was the beginning of the meteoric rise of a player in the rebellion: Phibun. After the rebellion, senior officers, such as Phraya Song and his friends, who had kept aloof from the military conflict, found their influence dashed. In 1932, Phibun had been simply one of the junior coup members. Now he moved up rapidly in the military hierarchy. He became Minister of Defense in early-1934. Phibun gradually weakened his enemies and eventually eliminated them. Several others were accused of being involved in plot to overthrow the government, which was the most effective way to attack rivals. He also built up his political constituency in the armed forces. He replaced Phahon as prime minister from 1938 to 1944, the de facto dictator of Thailand. He served again from 1948 to 1957. He remains the longest serving prime minister in Thai history.

=== 21st century reverberations ===
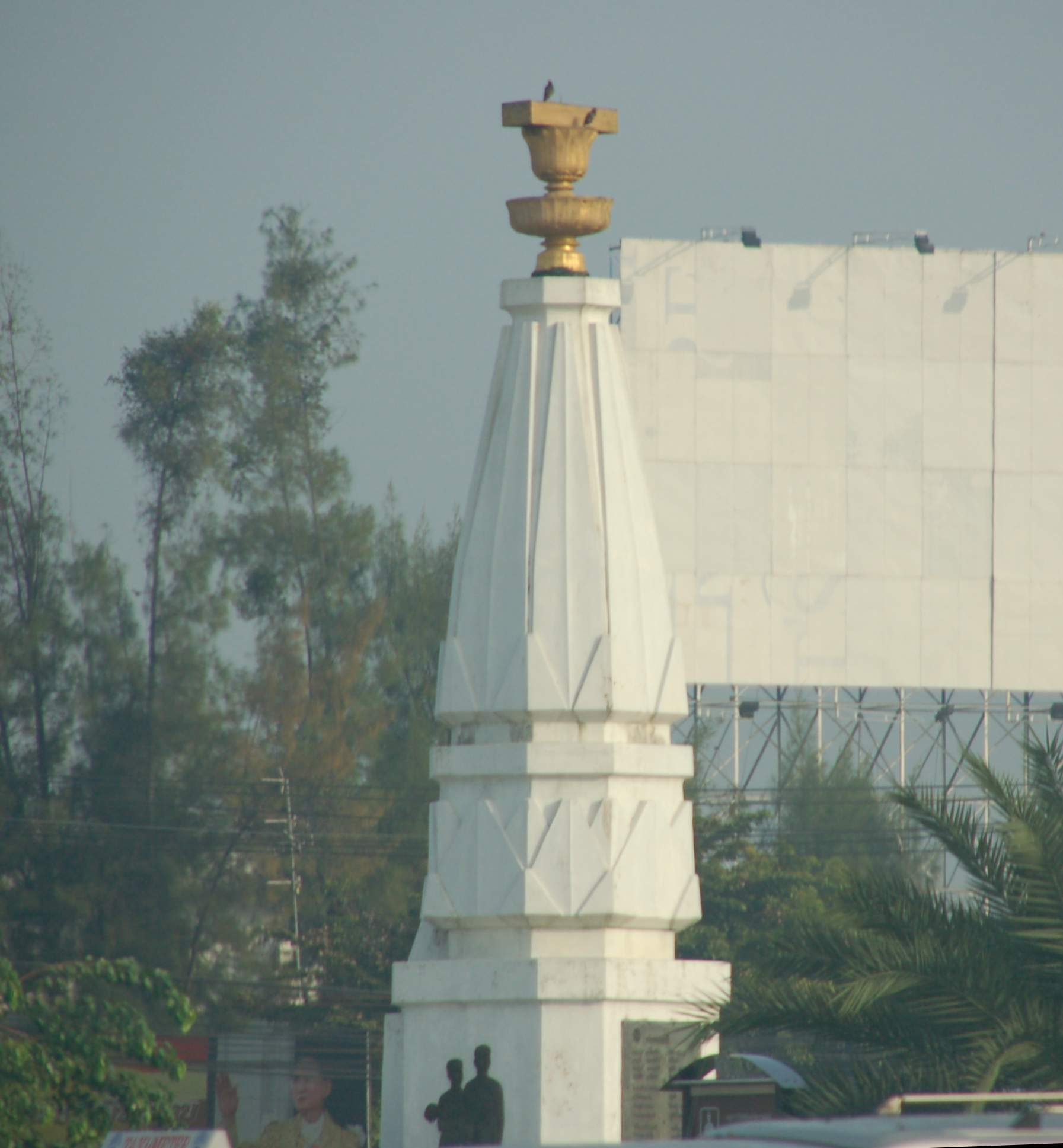
The Constitution Defense Monument, Bang Khen District, Bangkok, 2008

The People's Party government erected a monument commemorating the defeat of the rebellion in 1936, which became known as the Constitution Defense Monument. On 27 December 2018, the monument was removed without notice or explanation. Officials denied knowing anything about the removal. The removal marks the second time in two years that a monument in Thailand has been removed in secret and without explanation. In April 2017, a plaque commemorating the 1932 revolution that ended absolute monarchy disappeared from the Royal Plaza and was replaced with one extolling the monarchy.

On 24 June 2020, the 88th anniversary of the Revolution, saw commemorations of the event throughout Bangkok. The Royal Thai Army observed the date by hosting a Buddhist ceremony at the army's information centre and army headquarters praising the Boworadet rebellion. The army's statement included this: "The heroic deeds and sacrifice of Prince Boworadet and Phraya Si Sitthisongkhram deserved to be recognized as protectors of the monarchy institution and an attempt to ensure that Thailand has a truly democratic system." The army's view was that the People's Party was not only anti-democratic, but wanted to overthrow the monarch. The army's ceremony came two and half years after the mysterious removal of a monument commemorating the defeat of the Boworadet rebellion in the Lak Si area of Bangkok.

== See also ==
- History of Thailand (1932-1973)
- Siamese Revolution of 1932
- Siamese coup d'état of 1933
- Wat Phra Si Mahathat

== Notes ==
1. Phraya is a Thai noble rank. Although the revolution of 1932 ended absolute monarchy, noble ranks and titles were only abolished in 1942. Many people on both sides of the rebellion were thus identified by their nobility designations.
