= Hin Lap railway station =

Railway station in Thailand

Coordinates: 14°39′46.95″N 101°7′59.27″E

Hin Lap หินลับ

General information
- Location: Ban Hin Lap, Muak Lek Subdistrict, Muak Lek District; Saraburi Province; Thailand
- Operator: State Railway of Thailand (SRT)
- Manager: Ministry of Transport
- Line: Ubon Ratchathani Main Line
- Distance: 144.29 km (89.7 mi) from Bangkok
- Platforms: 1
- Tracks: 7

Construction
- Structure type: At-grade

Other information
- Station code: หล.
- Classification: Class 3

History
- Closed: 16 December 2025 (passenger)

Services
Preceding station	State Railway of Thailand	Following station
Pha Sadet towards Hua Lamphong or Krung Thep Aphiwat	Northeastern Line	Muak Lek towards Ubon Ratchathani or Khamsavath (Laos)
Location

Hin Lap railway station (Thai: สถานีรถไฟหินลับ) is a freight railway station in Muak Lek Subdistrict, Muak Lek District, Saraburi Province, Thailand. The station is classified as a class 3 railway station and is 144.29 km (89.7 mi) from Bangkok railway station (Hua Lamphong railway station). No passenger services operate at the station.

It is the location of the CSR SDA4 electro-diesel locomotive depot, operated by TPI Polene (Public) Co., Ltd. and is the departure and terminal station for many freight trains on the many main railway lines as well.

== History ==
During the "Boworadet Rebellion" in October 1933, Colonel Phraya Si Sitthisongkhram, one of the rebel leaders was shot dead while retreating near telegraph pole 143/1 of the railway line, about 1 km (0.6 mi) before Hin Lap station at dusk on October 23, 1933. A plaque commemorating his death is currently installed here.

As part of the double tracking project, a new railway line between Map Kabao and Muak Lek was constructed to bypass the mountainous curved route through the Dong Phaya Yen forest, of which includes Pha Sadet and Hin Lap railway stations. The line initially opened for passenger services on 28 July 2024. However, after the passage of three trains through the Pha Sadet and Hin Lap tunnels, reports of significant dust and particulate remnants from the construction blowing into the open-air carriages, prompting SRT to temporarily suspend railway services for a cleanup of the railway line. The line reopened on 16 December 2024, resulting in the cessation of passenger services at Pha Sadet and Hin Lap railway stations on the same day. The line remains open for freight services to the TPI Polene cement factory adjacent to the station.
