= Standard (Thailand) =

Defunct weekly newspaper in Bangkok, Thailand

- 19 February 1966 issue of Standard
- Type: Weekly newspaper
- Format: Tabloid
- Editor: Prem Purachatra and Ngarmchit Purachatra
- Founded: 8 June 1946
- Ceased publication: 1968
- Language: English
- Headquarters: Bangkok, Thailand

The Standard was an English-language weekly newspaper whose first issue was published in Thailand on 8 June 1946. On 26 February 1966, starting from issue no. 1000 it was renamed Standard International until it was merged on 14 April 1968 with Bangkok World, Sunday Magazine Section to form Standard Bangkok magazine. The Standard presented a summary of local and international news and featured articles on domestic and foreign affairs. It emphasized news of society and the royal family. It was widely read by foreigners and English-speaking Thai for its coverage of social events.

== See also ==
- Timeline of English-language newspapers published in Thailand
- List of online newspaper archives - Thailand
