= Chaturonrasmi =

- Prince Chakkrabatradipongse
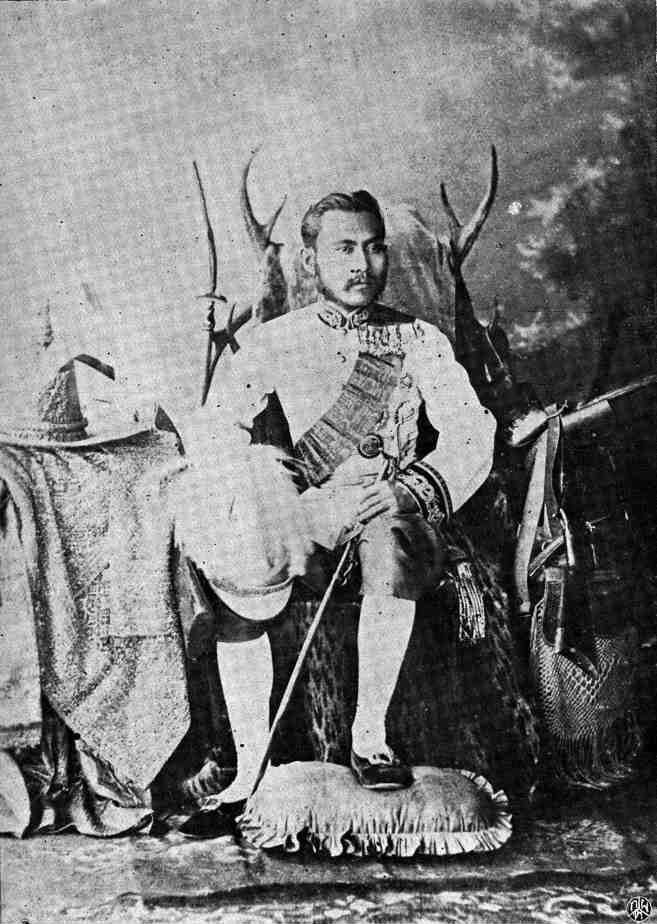
- Born: 13 January 1856; Bangkok, Siam
- Died: 11 April 1900 (aged 44); Phra Racha Wang Derm, Bangkok, Siam
- Spouse: Sawang and others: Sawang Chakrabandh; Mom Tabtim; Mom Jeeb; Mom Aim; Mom Phlat; Mom Leuam; Mom Puan; Phad Chakrabandh; Pui Chakrabandh
- Issue: 17 sons and daughters, lncluding: Prabhavasit Narimol
- House: Chakri Dynasty
- Father: Mongkut (Rama IV)
- Mother: Debsirindra

Minister of Royal Treasury
- In office 1886–1892
- Preceded by: Prince Mahamala
- Succeeded by: Prince Narisara Nuwattiwong

Prince Chaturonrasmi, the Prince Chakkrabatradipongse (Thai: สมเด็จพระเจ้าบรมวงศ์เธอ เจ้าฟ้าจาตุรนต์รัศมี กรมพระจักรพรรดิพงศ์; 13 January 1856 - 11 April 1900) was a Prince of Siam (later Thailand). He was a member of Siamese royal family, a son of King Mongkut and Queen Debsirindra and was a younger brother of King Chulalongkorn. He was Minister of Finance from 1886 to 1892.
