= Phraya Si Sitthisongkhram =

Thai military leader (1891–1933)

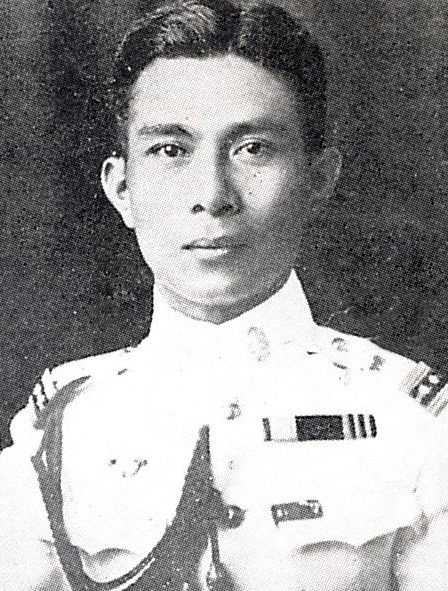
Phraya Si SithiSongkram

Phraya Si Sitthisongkhram (Thai: พระยาศรีสิทธิสงคราม) or birth name Din Tharap (Thai: ดิ่น ท่าราบ; 10 May 1891–23 October 1933) was a Siamese career army officer. He became chief of staff of the First Army under the absolute monarchy, and was chief of operations of the army briefly during the post-1932 constitutional monarchy. He served as deputy commander of the royalist troops during the failed Boworadet Rebellion of 1933.

== Biography ==
Din Tharab studied at a military academy in Imperial Germany where he was a classmate with Phot Phahonyothin and Thep Phanthumasen. He received several royal titles, eventually becoming Phraya Sitthisongkhram. He was invited by his two classmates to join the Khana Ratsadon (People's Party) to revolutionize Siam, but he refused. He knew the whole plan but did not oppose it. An outspoken royalist, on 11 October 1933, he joined Prince Boworadet in a rebellion to restore power to King Rama VII, who had surrendered it the previous year to the People's Party after its successful coup. Initially, the Rebellion positioned itself at Don Mueang and Bang Khen, on the northern outskirts of Bangkok. After a week-long fight, however, rebel forces were driven away from Bangkok. From then on, the government troops gained momentum and kept advancing on the rebellion's headquarters at Nakhon Ratchasima. On 23 October government troops charged Phraya Si Sitthisongkram's defensive position. The battle was fierce, ending in bayonet fighting. Phraya Si Sitthisongkhram was shot and killed near Hin Lap railway station by Lieutenant Praphas Charusathien, who 40 years later would become one of the "three tyrants" deposed in the October 1973 uprising. The following day, Prince Boworadet fled to Saigon and the revolt ended.

Phraya Si Sitthisongkhram's daughter, Amphot Tharap, was the mother of General Surayud Chulanont, Commander of the Army and Prime Minister of Thailand following the successful army coup of 2006.

== See also ==
- Boworadej
- Plaek Pibulsonggram
- History of Thailand (1932-1973)
- Prajadhipok
- Surayud Chulanont

== Notes ==
1. Phraya is a Thai honorific, a title of ancient Thai civil nobility between พระ (Phra) and เจ้าพระยา (Chao Phraya).
