= Boworadet =

Siamese prince and military officer (1877–1953)

Boworadej Kridakorn
- Prince of Siam
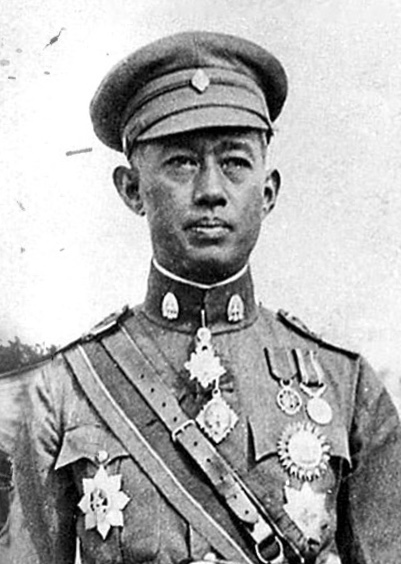
- General Prince Boworadej, leader of National Salvation Group

Minister of Defence
- In office: 1 April 1928 – 19 June 1931
- Predecessor: Paribatra Sukhumbandhu
- Successor: Vudhijaya Chalermlabha
- Monarch: Prajadhipok
- Born: Mom Chao Boworadej Kridakorn; 2 April 1877; Bangkok, Siam
- Died: 16 November 1953 (aged 76); Bangkok, Thailand
- House: Kritakara (Chakri dynasty)
- Father: Nares Varariddhi
- Military service
- Allegiance: Kingdom of Siam
- Branch: Royal Siamese Army
- Service years: 1900–1948
- Rank: General
- Commands: Royal Siamese Army (Chief of Staff, 1926)

Prince Boworadej (Thai: พระวรวงศ์เธอ พระองค์เจ้าบวรเดช; RTGS: Phra Worawong Thoe Phra Ong Chao Bawonradet; 2 April 1877 – 16 November 1953) was a Thai attempted-coup leader, government official, General, and royalty. After defeat in the 1933 rebellion, he sought asylum in Cambodia where he lived until 1948 when he returned to Thailand and died in 1953.

== Early life ==
Mom Chao Boworadej Kridakorn born on 2 April 1877 in Bangkok. Boworadej was one of the grandsons of King Mongkut, a son of Prince Naret. Boworadej received his military education at the Harrow School in 1898, and the Royal Military Academy Woolwich in 1900. Boworadej moved back to Siam in 1900 to serve in Royal Thai Army's Command and General Staff Department.

== Government official career ==
Boworadej was a career soldier who had served as an ambassador in Paris towards the end of King Chulalongkorn's reign from 1902 to 1905. He was "retired" in the latter part of King Vajiravudh's reign, but he was brought back into active service shortly after King Prajadhipok ascended the throne. Boworadej became the Royal Thai Army Chief of Staff in 1926. He took over the position as the Minister of Defence from Prince Boriphat who was promoted to Interior Minister in 1928. In 1929 the king honored Boworadej by raising him from His Serene Highness to His Highness status.

His Highness Prince Boworadej had a fierce conflict with Prince Boriphat over the budget for the coming year in 1931. Prince Boworadej submitted his resignation to express his dissatisfaction. After some disputes by both sides, the resignation of Prince Boworadej was accepted by the Supreme Council of State and King Prajadhipok. The prince's relationship with other powerful princes soured after this crisis.

The Special Court's "Decision on the Insurrection" noted that Prince Boworadej had once consulted General Phahon and Phaya Srisith about the plan to change the government. Because of the prince's reluctance to use force to overthrow the government, the Promoters carried out the revolution without the prince's participation. He then expected Phahon to invite him to be prime minister. Pridi rejected Phahon's recommendation and named Phraya Manopakorn Nititada as prime minister instead of the prince. Boworadej was then at odds with the Promoters. An ardent royalist, he was furious that anyone was allowed to sue the king. This added to his displeasure at Phahon's coup in 1933 against Manopakorn and Phahon's support of Pridi against the monarch.

At the end of July 1933, Phibun and Supha sent a circular to a number of prominent individuals warning them to "exercise peace of mind", otherwise the "party will be forced to bring stringent measures to bear on you." A number of members of the royal house received the letter, including Prince Boworadej, who was in Hua Hin with the king at that time. The combined catalysts of the warning and Pridi's return stirred Prince Boworadej to seek revenge on the Promoters.

== Rebellion leader ==
In 1933, Prince Boworadej plotted with Colonel Phraya Sri Sitthi Songkhram (Thai: พระยาศรีสิทธิ์สงคราม), the commander of the military in Bangkok, to stage a coup d'état to unseat the Phahon government and replace it with a more traditional one.

Early in October 1933, Prince Boworadej appeared in Korat to mobilize the army to rebel. He soon took complete control of Korat and got positive responses from other provinces. On 11 October 1933, under the leadership of Boworadej, calling on the government to resign immediately or be removed by force on the same day, the government in Bangkok refused to comply with their demands. Government forces were defeated and several members of the government were captured.

Boworadej tried to persuade other forces to join him, including the Royal Thai Navy, which instead declared itself neutral. The commander-in-chief of the navy withdrew his battleships from the capital and sailed to ports in the south. The People's Party put out radio broadcasts and leaflets damning the Boworadej forces as "rebels" and "bandits". In reply, the besiegers dropped leaflets on the city from airplanes, accusing the people's party of restraining King Prajadhipok.

Faced with the prospect of a full-scale battle to remove the existing leadership, Boworadej adopted a more conciliatory approach by entering into negotiations in which he called on the government to allow the king a greater political role. On 13 October, Boworadej sent another ultimatum to the government. The rebel leaders backed down from their original demand for the government to resign as troops in the provinces they counted on failed to march on Bangkok and all the units in Bangkok remained loyal to the government.

By the end of October 1933, rebel remnants dispersed after Phibun commanded a counterattack in Bangkok, and the royalist rebellion was over. The government broadcast a radio appeal to rebel troops to surrender and offered a ten thousand baht reward for the capture of Boworadej.

== On exile ==
On 25 October Boworadej and his wife boarded an aeroplane and left Siam for Vietnam, then part of French Indochina. The People's Party arrested the stragglers and eventually jailed 230 people including Boworadej's younger brother, Prince Sinthiphorn Kadakorn. Boworadej sought asylum in Cambodia, where he lived until 1948. He then returned home to Thailand, received the army general rank, and dying in 1953 at the age of 76.

== Honours ==
=== National honours ===
- Knight of the Ratana Varabhorn Order of Merit (1918)
- Knight Grand Cross of the Most Illustrious Order of Chula Chom Klao (1929)
- Knight Grand Cross of the Most Exalted Order of the White Elephant (1913)
- Knight Grand Cross of the Most Noble Order of the Crown of Thailand (1910)
- Knight Commander of the Honourable Order of Rama (1918)
- Member of the Vallabhabhorn Order (1919)
- Dushdi Mala Medal for Military (1901)
- Chakra Mala Medal (1916)
- King Rama V Royal Cypher Medal, 3rd Class (1911)
- King Rama VI Royal Cypher Medal, 2nd Class (1922)
- King Rama VII Royal Cypher Medal, 2nd Class (1926)

=== Foreign honours ===
- France:
  - Grand Officer of the National Order of the Legion of Honour (1911)
- Ottoman Empire:
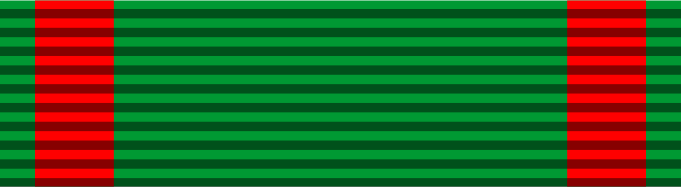
  - Order of Osmanieh, First Class (1909)
- Romania:
  - Grand Cross of the Order of the Crown of Romania (1909)
- Spain:
  - Knight Grand Cross of the Order of Isabella the Catholic (1911)

Boworadet House of Kritakara Cadet branch of the House of Chakri Born: 2 April 1877 Died: 16 November 1953
Political offices
Preceded by Paribatra Sukhumbandhu	Minister of Defence; 1928–1931	Succeeded by Vudhijaya Chalermlabha
First	President of the National Salvation Group; 1933	Defeated
Military offices
Preceded by Paribatra Sukhumbandhu	Minister of War; 1928–1931	Succeeded by Vudhijaya Chalermlabha
