= Prem Purachatra =

Thai prince, diplomat, English instructor, publisher, poet, playwright and author

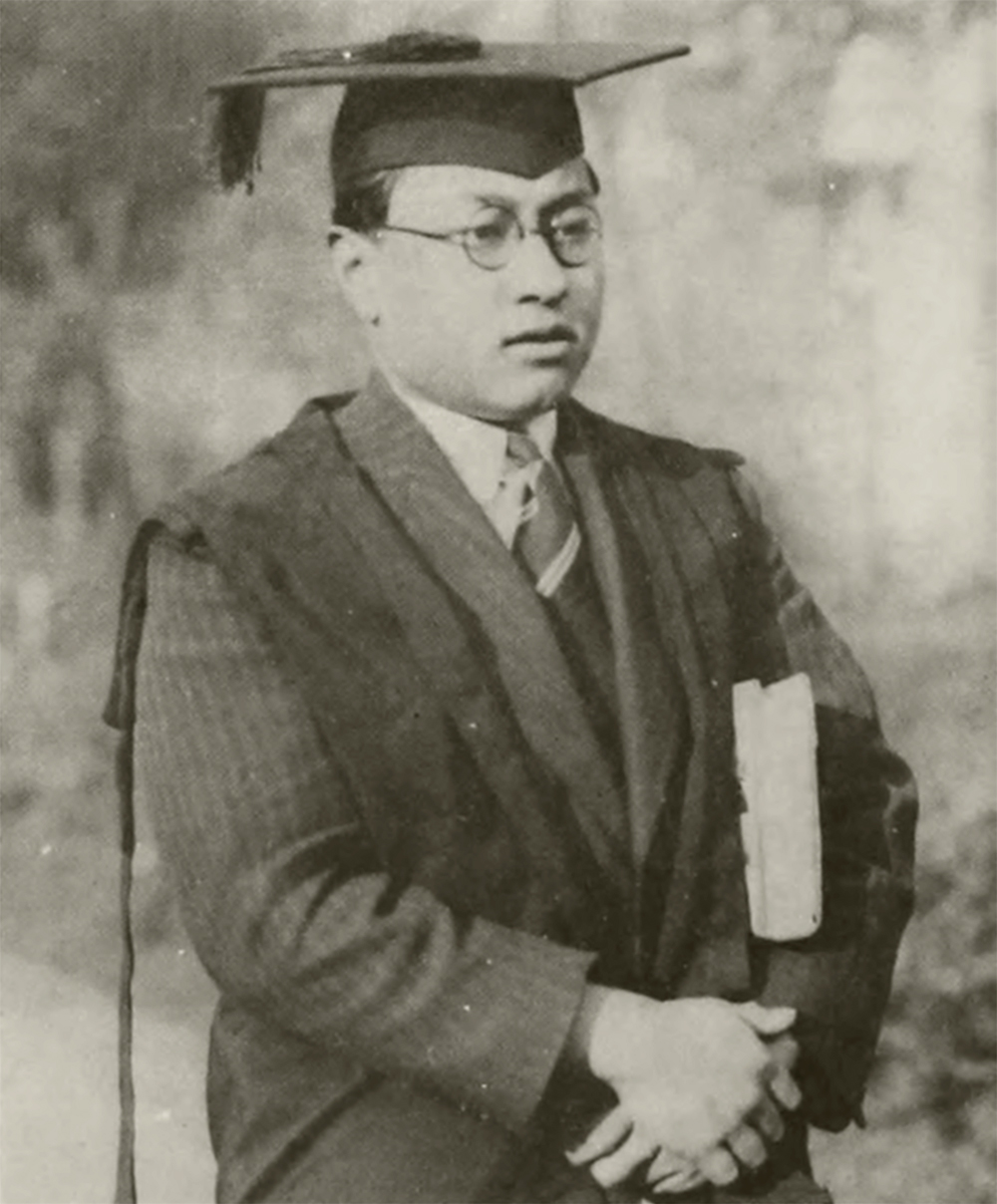
- Born: 12 August 1915; Bangkok, Siam
- Died: 24 July 1981 (aged 65); Bangkok, Thailand
- Spouse: Ngarmchit Purachatra
- Issue: Thirachatra Purachatra (adopted)
- House: Purachatra family (Chakri Dynasty)
- Father: Purachatra Jayakara, Prince of Kamphaengphet
- Mother: Princess Prabhavasit Narimol

Prince Prem Purachatra (Thai: พระวรวงศ์เธอ พระองค์เจ้าเปรมบุรฉัตร; RTGS: Prem Burachat; 12 August 1915 – 24 July 1981) was a Thai prince who worked as a diplomat, English instructor, publisher, poet, playwright, and author. He was a son of Prince Purachatra Jayakara and grandson of King Chulalongkorn (Rama V). He served as president of the Siam Society, was a fellow of the Royal Institute, headed the Department of Modern Languages at Chulalongkorn University (now the Language Institute, which is housed in a building bearing his name), and published the weekly English-language magazine Standard. He was married to Ngarmchit Purachatra.
