= Ngarmchit Purachatra =

Thai princess and philanthropist

Mom Ngarmchit Purachatra na Ayudhya
- งามจิตต์ บุรฉัตร ณ อยุธยา
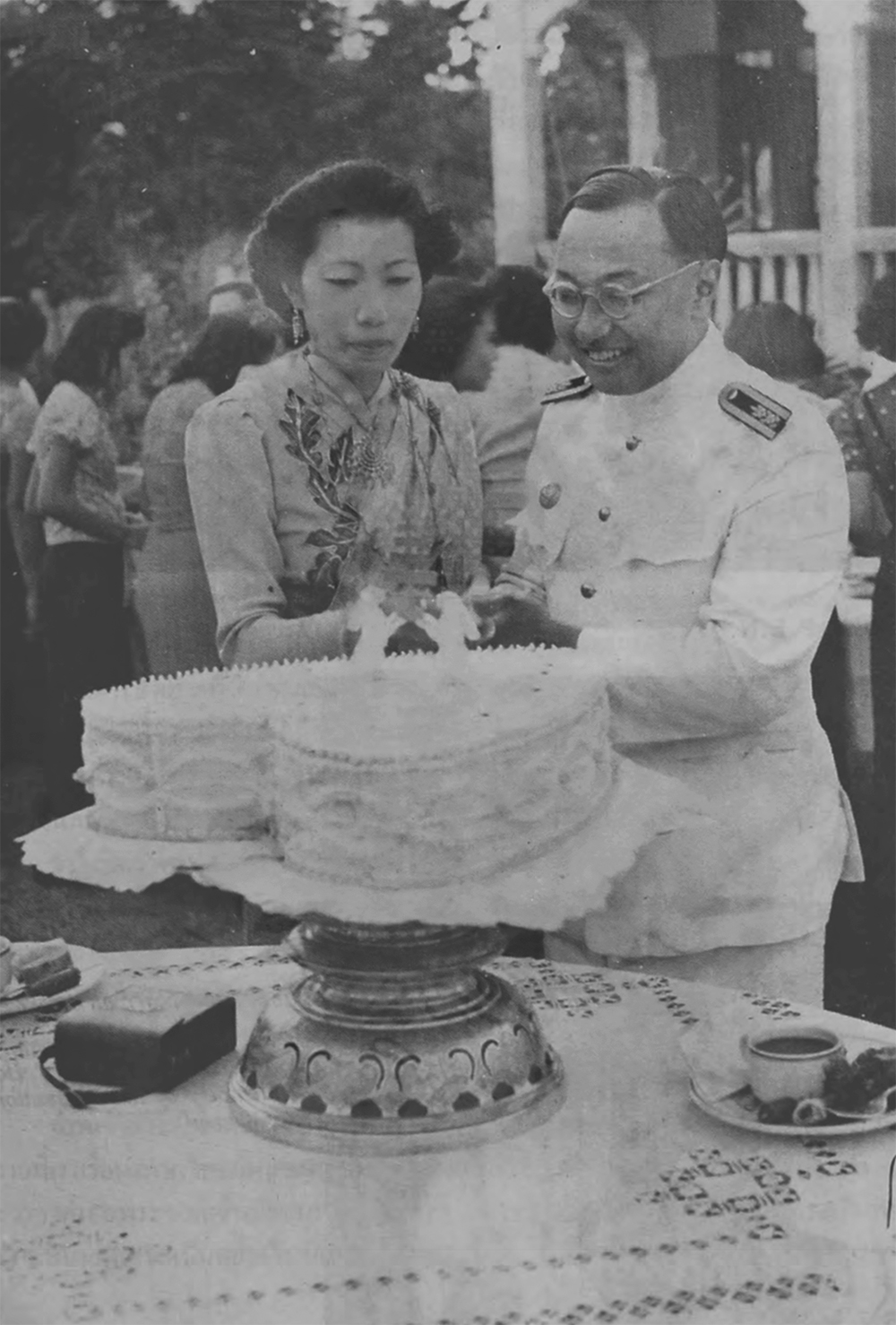
- Ngarmchit (left)
- Born: Ngarmchit Sarasas; 7 June 1915; Bangkok, Siam
- Died: 18 October 1983 (aged 68); Samitivej Hospital, Bangkok, Thailand
- Spouse: Prince Prem Purachatra (m. 1940; died 1981)
- Children: Thirachatra Purachatra (adopted)
- Parents: Long Sundananda (father); Sawat Asavananda (mother)

Ngarmchit Purachatra na Ayudhya (Note: Thai: งามจิตต์ บุรฉัตร ณ อยุธยา; IPA: [ŋāːm.tɕìt bù.rá.tɕʰàt náʔ à.jút.tʰá.jāː]; RTGS: Ngamchit Burachat Na Ayutthaya) (7 June 1915 – 18 October 1983), née Ngarmchit Sarasas, (Note: Thai: งามจิตต์ สารสาส; RTGS: Ngamchit Sarasat) also known after her husband as Princess Prem Purachatra, was a Thai princess by marriage and an advocate for charity and for women.

== Life ==
Her birth name has been transliterated as Ngamchitti, Ngarmchit or Ngarm Jittra. She was the daughter of Phra Sarasat Phonla Khan (Long Sundananda), who was lieutenant general. Her father was involved in the Siamese revolution of 1932 and was briefly Minister of Economic Affairs in 1937. A supporter of the Japanese cause, he lived from 1940 in his Japan exile, where he wrote a book about his country of origin.

Her mother was Sawat Asavananda. Ngarmchit Sarasas had one elder brother, and three younger sisters. She attended schools in Bangkok and later began studying pharmacy at Sorbonne in France, when her father served there at the Thai embassy. During this time, she learned French, English and Spanish.

In 1939, she returned to Thailand because of the outbreak of World War II. In the following year, on 22 January 1940, she married Prince Prem Purachatra (12 August 1915 – 24 July 1981), the grandson of king Chulalongkorn and only son of Purachatra Jayakara. Her husband was a literary scholar who was known for translating classical Thai poems and theater plays into English. The couple had no children, but adopted one son.

In 1946, they founded the Standard, a weekly newspaper for an international audience interested in Thailand, for which Ngarmchit was the editor. She was also editor of several other publications, among them the newspaper of the Thai Red Cross Youth Movement.

From 1943 onwards, she was engaged in various social organisations, among them the Red Cross Volunteers and the YWCA. Under royal patronage, she founded schools and organizations for children, health and social welfare. In 1970, she initiated the Thai SOS Children Foundation. Among others, she founded welfare organizations for crippled persons in 1944, mentally disabled persons in 1962 and for physically disabled persons in 1980. Her contributions to societal and cultural wellbeing had a notable impact on Thailand.

When her husband Prem Purachatra was appointed as ambassador to various countries between 1968 and 1975, Ngarmchit followed him to these posts, abandoning her work for the Standard for which she had been editor for 20 years.

She was elected president of the new founded National Council of Women of Thailand in 1959, which was representing Thai women in the international umbrella organization, the International Council of Women. In that organization, she served as president between 1976 and 1979.

Interested in traditional craft, she founded the Asian Handicraft Promotion and Development Association in 1981, which was as local partner organization with UNESCO. She was also engaged in other rural development projects. Furthermore, she donated to scholars of buddhist faith, but also participated in Muslim and Christian welfare activities. In the first few years of the Cambodian–Vietnamese War with Vietnamese border raids in Thailand, she promoted donation campaigns to supply soldiers and border patrols with presents.

She died hospitalized in 1983, surviving her husband by two years.

== Legacy ==
Among others, she received the Order of Chula Chom Klao, Order of the Crown of Thailand and the Order of the White Elephant.

She was honored in 2015 on a 3-Baht-stamp as The World's Eminent Person, as it was the year of her 100th birthday.

Several foundations she set up in her name are still continuing her work.
