= Kaeng Khoi district =

Kaeng Khoi แก่งคอย
- District
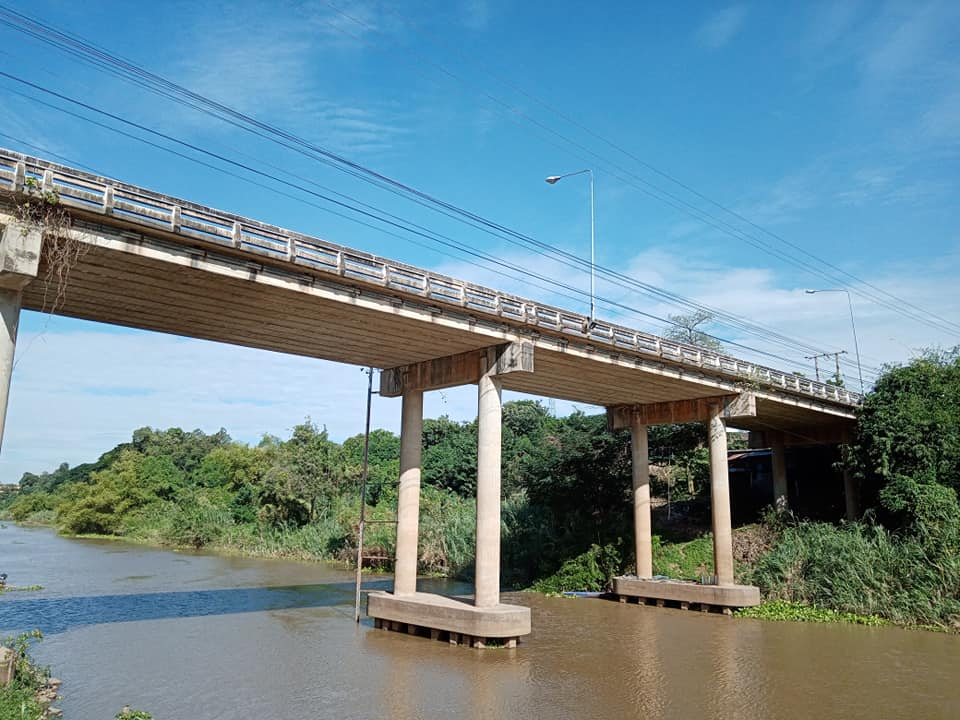
- The Bridge over Pa Sak River in Kaeng Khoi

- District location in Saraburi province
- Coordinates: 14°35′11″N 100°59′52″E
- Country: Thailand
- Province: Saraburi
- Seat: Kaeng Khoi

Area
  - Total: 801.1 km^{2} (309.3 sq mi)

Population (2005)
  - Total: 88,921
  - Density: 111.0/km^{2} (287.5/sq mi)
- Time zone: UTC+7 (ICT)
- Postal code: 18110
- Geocode: 1902

Kaeng Khoi (Thai: แก่งคอย, pronounced [kɛ̀ŋ kʰɔ̄ːj]) is a district (amphoe) of Saraburi province in central Thailand. Located on the bank of the Pa Sak River amid the surrounding hills of the Dong Phaya Yen Mountains, its main town of the same name developed throughout the 19th century, first as a trading post on the river and the passageway into the Northeast, then as a railway town when the Northeastern Railway was built through the town at the end of the century. Today, it has developed into a major industrial centre, especially of cement manufacturing.

== History ==
Evidence of early human settlement in the area now covered by Kaeng Khoi district is found in the archaeological site of Ban Dong Nam Bo by the Pa Sak River, which revealed a late-prehistoric (iron age) settlement dated to 2,000–1,500 years before present, and the cave of Tham Phra Phothisat in the hills to the district's east, which features Dvaravati-era Buddhist carvings tentatively dated to the 6th to 8th centuries CE.

The town of Kaeng Khoi developed as an outlying population centre of Saraburi during the early Rattanakosin period (late 18th to early 19th centuries). It was, along with several outlying communities of Saraburi, mostly populated by forced Lao settlers from Vientiane, who had been brought as war captives following Siam's capture of the city in 1778 and again following the Anouvong rebellion in 1828. Kaeng Khoi became an important trading outpost, as it was both a stop for smaller vessels traversing the Pa Sak (larger vessels could only reach as far as Pak Phriao, the current location of Saraburi town) and the beginning of the route through the jungles of Dong Phaya Fai (later renamed Dong Phaya Yen) which lead across a mountain pass into the Khorat Plateau. The name Kaeng Khoi, whose words mean 'river islet' and 'wait', probably referred to the slow navigation through this part of the river.

Kaeng Khoi was established as a separate administrative district—then known as a khwaeng—in 1827. It would become an amphoe (today's district) following administrative reforms in 1897. The office of the district was moved from the Pa Sak River bank to the near the Kaeng Khoi Railway Station in 1915, and then to its current location in 1962.

In 1859, Vice-king Pinklao had a palace built by the river near the town, and made annual seasonal visits until his death in 1866, after which it was demolished. It is now known as Si Tha Palace after the subdistrict of its location. The Pa Sak passed through steep hills north and upriver from Kaeng Khoi, and it became known as a site for nature excursions, according to writings by Prince Damrong Rajanubhab during the reign of King Vajiravudh (Rama VI, 1910–1925).

When the Northeastern Railway was built during the reign of King Chulalongkorn, Kaeng Khoi became the site of a major rail facility, servicing locomotives used for the uphill climb into the plateau. Kaeng Khoi station, opened in 1897, would later also become a major junction, and the town further developed as a railway town. From the 1970s, a cement industry developed in Kaeng Khoi district, and licences were granted for extensive limestone quarries in the nearby hills. Industry has since grown to become a major component of Kaeng Khoi's economy, though tensions over development and the pollution it causes have also arisen among the population.

== Geography ==
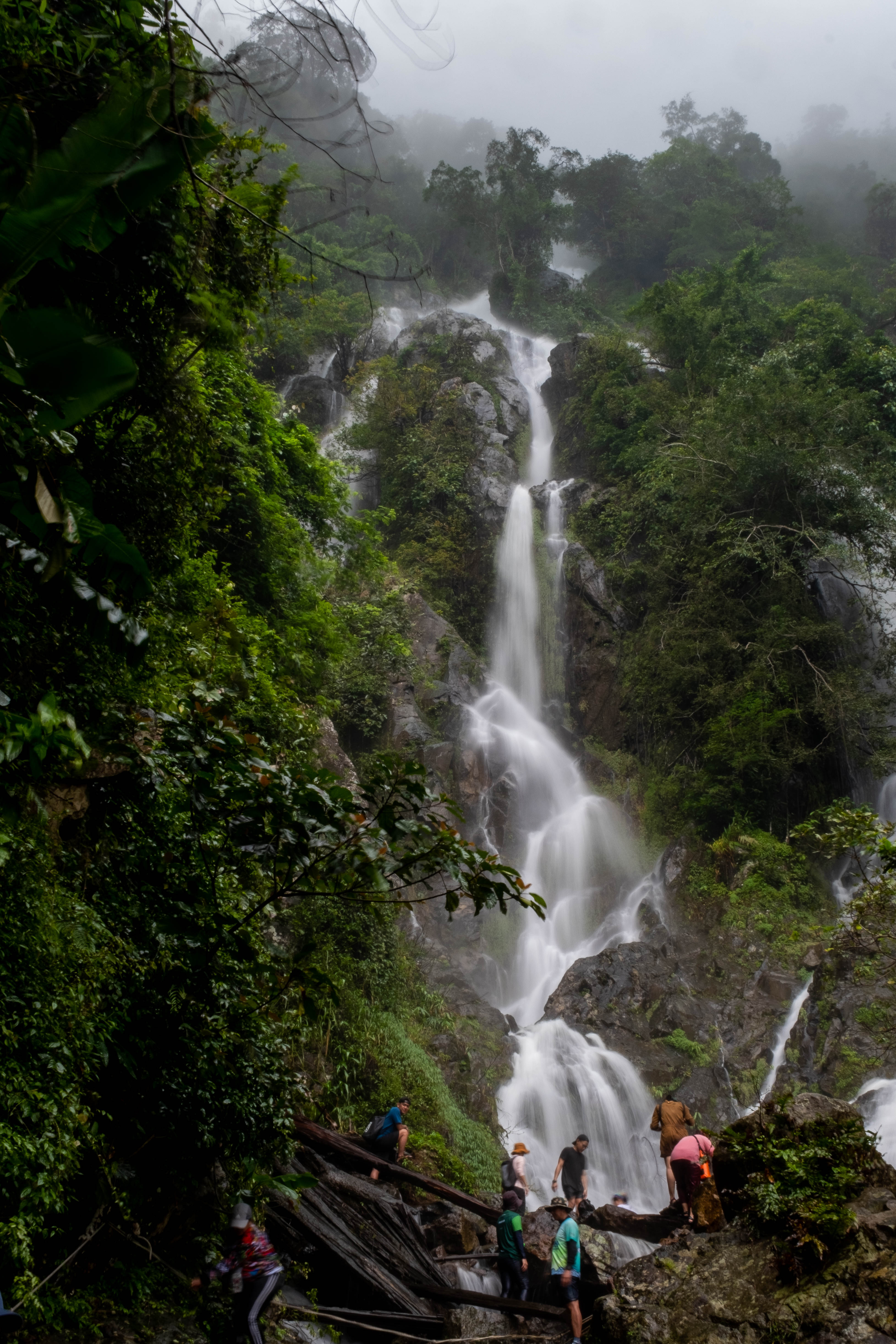
Krok Idok Waterfall, a large waterfall in the area of Chet Khot–Pong Kon Sao Nature Study Centre

Kaeng Khoi is the largest district in Saraburi by area, occupying a north–south swath in the province's centre-east portion. Neighbouring districts are (from the north clockwise) Phatthana Nikhom of Lopburi province, Wang Muang and Muak Lek of Saraburi Province, Mueang Nakhon Nayok and Ban Na of Nakhon Nayok province, Wihan Daeng, Mueang Saraburi, and Chaloem Phra Kiat of Saraburi.

Kaeng Khoi district partly covers the western fringes of the Dong Phaya Yen Mountains which separate central Thailand from the northeastern Isan region, and the western end of Khao Yai National Park occupies its southeastern tip, while part of Namtok Sam Lan National Park covers its southwestern corner. The Chet Khot–Pong Kon Sao Nature Study Centre, containing several waterfalls, also lies in the mountains, in the district's east. The Pa Sak River flows southward from the district's north, past Kaeng Khoi town, then westward to Saraburi. The smaller town of Thap Kwang lies to the east, near the factories.

== Economy ==
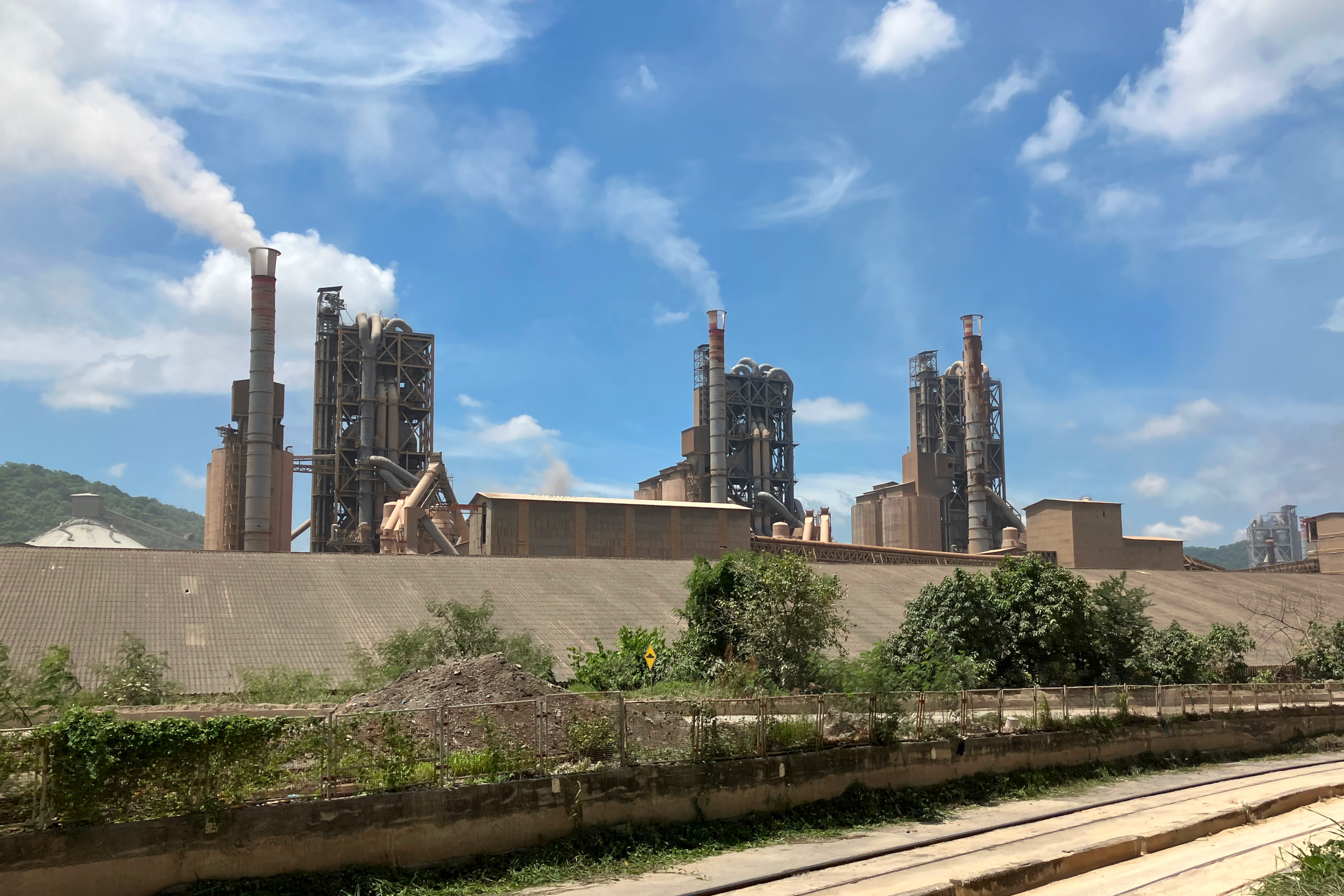
The TPI Polene cement plant

Kaeng Khoi is at the heart of the country's cement manufacturing industry, with major plants and quarries located in the district—including those of Siam Cement Group, Siam City Cement and TPI Polene—accounting for 70 percent of the country's production. It is also home to major ceramics and sanitary ware producers, as well as other manufacturing industries and power plants.

== Transport ==
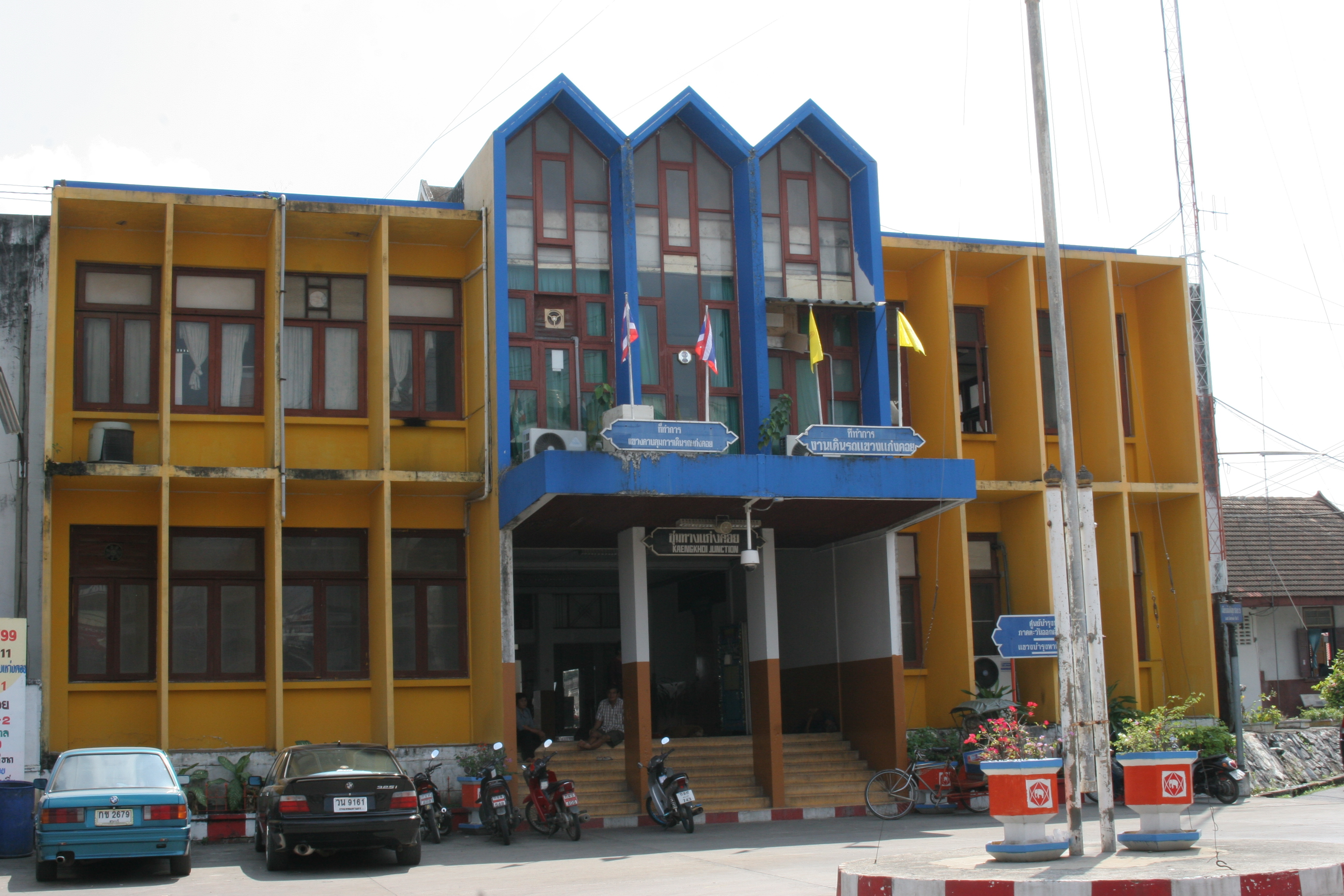
Front of Kaeng Khoi Junction Railway Station

Mittraphap Road—designated National Highway 2—and the State Railway of Thailand's Northeastern Line cross the district from west to east, running roughly parallel to each other. Highway 3222 leads south from Kaeng Khoi town to Ban Na in Nakhon Nayok province, and will provide access to the under-construction (as of 2022) Motorway 6 towards Bangkok and Nakhon Ratchasima.

Kaeng Khoi Junction railway station lies near the heart of Kaeng Khoi town. It is a major junction, with branch lines leading south to Chachoengsao on the Eastern Line and north to Bua Yai. It is located 125.106 km (77.7 mi) from Bangkok Railway Station (Hua Lamphong).

== Administration ==
The district is divided into 14 subdistricts (tambon), which are further subdivided into 116 villages (muban). Kaeng Khoi is a town (thesaban mueang) and Thap Kwang a subdistrict municipality (thesaban tambon), both covering the same-named tambon. There are 12 subdistrict administrative organizations (SAO) in the district.

No.	Name	Thai name	Villages	Pop.
1.	Kaeng Khoi	แก่งคอย	-	11,921
2.	Thap Kwang	ทับกวาง	10	14,991
3.	Tan Diao	ตาลเดี่ยว	11	9,487
4.	Huai Haeng	ห้วยแห้ง	12	6,947
5.	Tha Khlo	ท่าคล้อ	11	4,619
6.	Hin Son	หินซ้อน	9	3,535
7.	Ban That	บ้านธาตุ	5	1,807
8.	Ban Pa	บ้านป่า	10	9,028
9.	Tha Tum	ท่าตูม	4	2,130
10.	Cha-om	ชะอม	11	6,891
11.	Song Khon	สองคอน	11	6,180
12.	Tao Pun	เตาปูน	7	2,029
13.	Cham Phak Phaeo	ชำผักแพว	10	5,849
15.	Tha Maprang	ท่ามะปราง	5	3,507

Geocode 14 is not used.
