= Vudhijaya Chalermlabha =

Vudhijaya Chalermlabha วุฒิชัยเฉลิมลาภ
- Prince of Singha
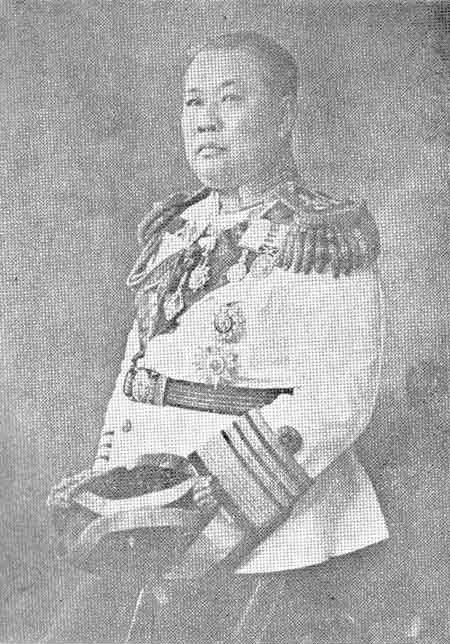
- HRH Prince of Singha

Minister of Defence
- In office: 8 November 1931 – 19 June 1932
- Predecessor: Boworadej
- Successor: Phraya Ratchawangsana

Minister of the Royal Siamese Navy
- In office: 13 February 1924 – 30 June 1932
- Predecessor: Asdang Dejavudh as the naval regent
- Successor: Phraya Preechacholayudha as the commander-in-chief
- Born: 5 December 1883; Bangkok, Siam
- Died: 18 October 1947 (aged 64); Bangkok, Siam
- Spouse: Princess Prombraobarn Diskul; Prapan Chatarung
- Issue: Prince Songvudhijaya Vudhijaya; Prince Udayachalermlabh Vudhijaya; Princess Suvabavabraobarn Vudhijaya; Princess To Vudhijaya; Prince Pho Vudhijaya; Prince Kraisingha Vudhijaya; Princess Vudhisavad Vudhijaya; Princess Vudhichalerm Vudhijaya; Princess Vudhividura Vudhijaya
Names
- HRH Prince Vudhijaya Chalermlabha
- House: Vudhijaya family (Chakri Dynasty)
- Father: Chulalongkorn (Rama V)
- Mother: Tabtim Rojanatisha

Admiral Prince Vudhijaya Chalermlabh, Prince of Singha (5 December 1883 – 18 October, 1947) was a member of Chakri Dynasty. He served as Minister of Defence and commander of Royal Thai Army between 1931 and 1932. Before then he served as the Minister of the Navy of Royal Thai Navy between 1924 and 1932.

He had trained in the British Royal Navy and was serving as a midshipman in the Mediterranean when in April 1904 he was rescued from drowning off the coast of Sardinia by the efforts of Captain Christopher Cradock of HMS Bacchante.

== Ancestry ==
Ancestor of Chirapravati Voradej
Prince Vudhijaya Chalermlabha	Father: Chulalongkorn, King Rama V of Siam	Paternal Grandfather: Mongkut, King Rama IV of Siam	Paternal Great-grandfather: Buddha Loetla Nabhalai, King Rama II of Siam
Prince Vudhijaya Chalermlabha	Father: Chulalongkorn, King Rama V of Siam	Paternal Grandfather: Mongkut, King Rama IV of Siam	Paternal Great-grandmother: Queen Sri Suriyendra
Prince Vudhijaya Chalermlabha	Father: Chulalongkorn, King Rama V of Siam	Paternal Grandmother: Queen Debsirindra	Paternal Great-grandfather: Prince Sirivongse, the Prince Matayabidaksa
Prince Vudhijaya Chalermlabha	Father: Chulalongkorn, King Rama V of Siam	Paternal Grandmother: Queen Debsirindra	Paternal Great-grandmother: Mom Noi Sirivongs na Ayudhya
Prince Vudhijaya Chalermlabha	Mother: Chao Chom Manda Tabtim Rojanadis	Maternal Grandfather: Phraya Abbhantrikamas	Maternal Great-grandfather: unknown
Prince Vudhijaya Chalermlabha	Mother: Chao Chom Manda Tabtim Rojanadis	Maternal Grandfather: Phraya Abbhantrikamas	Maternal Great-grandmother: unknown
Prince Vudhijaya Chalermlabha	Mother: Chao Chom Manda Tabtim Rojanadis	Maternal Grandmother: Bang Rojanadis	Maternal Great-grandfather: unknown
Prince Vudhijaya Chalermlabha	Mother: Chao Chom Manda Tabtim Rojanadis	Maternal Grandmother: Bang Rojanadis	Maternal Great-grandmother: unknown

Vudhijaya Chalermlabh, Prince of Singha House of Vudhijaya Cadet branch of the House of Chakri Born: 5 December 1883 Died: 18 October 1947
Political offices
Preceded by Boworadet	Minister of Defence; 1931–1932	Succeeded by Ratchawangsan
Military offices
Preceded by Asdang Dejavudh as Director-General of the Navy	Minister of Navy; 1924–1932	Succeeded by Preechacholayudha as Commander-in-chief of the Royal Siamese Navy
Preceded by Boworadet	Minister of War; 1931–1932	Succeeded by Phahonphonphayuhasena as Commander-in-chief of the Royal Siamese Army
