= Khorat Thai =

Total population
- 10,000 (est. 1999); 600,000 (est. 2005)

Regions with significant populations
- Nakhon Ratchasima Province, Thailand

Languages
- Central Thai (Khorat dialect), others

Religion
- Theravada Buddhism

Chart shows the peopling of Thailand.

Khorat Thai, Korat Thai, Thai Korat or Thai Khorat (Thai: ไทโคราช; Thai pronunciation: [tʰaj kʰoːrâːt]) refers to an ethnic group named for their main settlement area in Nakhon Ratchasima Province, unofficially called "Korat". Korat Thai people call themselves Thai Boeng (ไทเบิ้ง [tʰaj bɤ̂ŋ]; also spelled Tai Berng or Tai Beung), Thai Doeng (ไทเดิ้ง [tʰaj dɤ̂ŋ]; Tai Derng, Tai Deung), or Thai Khorat. Other tribes in northern Thailand also refer to them by those names.

Theories of the origin of the name Thai Boeng are:

1. Boeng means 'some' or 'few'. Thai Khorat people lived in three major kingdoms: central Thai kingdoms (Ayutthaya, Thonburi, and Bangkok), Lao Kingdom, and Cambodia Kingdom. People who live in the Khorat area are of different origin—e.g., Thai, Lao, Khmer, Kui—and blended their cultures and beliefs together into their own culture.
2. It may be from their commonly used word, boeng is a word unique to the Thai Khorat people, and it is frequently used in their conversation.

Thai Khorat people have their own traditions and cultures called Khorat culture, which is similar to the culture of Thai people on the central plain, but their own unique words, dialect, costumes, songs, and beliefs are different from the rest of the Tai-speaking peoples. In spite of their Isan domicile, populated by northeast Thai speakers, the Khorat Thai speak Central Thai. Their fluency in the official Thai language has meant that the group does not appear on official lists of ethnic groups in Thailand. The group was however acknowledged in Thailand's 2011 report to the UN Committee on the Elimination of Racial Discrimination.

== Population ==
In 1999, Joachim Schliesinger estimated the number of Khorat Thai living in Thailand at 10,000. According to the Christian missionary Joshua Project, the population mainly inhabits two villages, Ban Nung Thap Prang and Ban Nong Samrong, both in the Chok Chai District about 20 kilometres (12 miles) south of the provincial capital. About 4,000 Khorat Thai live in each village. A few thousand Khorat Thai live in smaller villages in and around Nakhon Ratchasima City.

Thailand's 2011 report to the UN Committee on the Elimination of Racial Discrimination estimated the number of Thai Korat at 600,000, based on the 2005 Ethnolinguistic Maps of Thailand.

In addition to Nakhon Ratchasima Province, Thai Khorat also inhabit adjacent provinces:

1. Nakhon Ratchasima Province: all districts, except for the northern part, e.g., Non Sung District, Bua Yai District.
2. Saraburi Province: Wang Muang District
3. Lopburi Province: Phatthana Nikhom District, Chai Badan District, Khok Samrong District and Sa Bot District
4. Phetchabun Province: Si Thep District and Wichian Buri District
5. Chaiyaphum Province: Chatturat District and Bamnet Narong District
6. Buriram Province: Mueang Buriram District, Nang Rong District, Lahan Sai District, Nong Ki District, Chamni District and Lam Plai Mat District

== History ==
The Khorat Thai can be traced back at least to the late-17th century, when King Narai of the Ayutthaya Kingdom ordered a new city built as the eastern fortress of his kingdom. This was the origin of Nakhon Ratchasima city. The city thus marked the boundary between Ayutthaya and the Lao regions.

The Khorat Thai are closely related to the Thai people. Some claim they are descended from Thai soldiers who married Khmer women, though evidence proving this is lacking.
