= Khok Charoen district =

Khok Charoen โคกเจริญ
- District
- District location in Lopburi province
- Coordinates: 15°22′58″N 100°49′21″E
- Country: Thailand
- Province: Lopburi
- Seat: Khok Charoen

Area
  - Total: 317.1 km^{2} (122.4 sq mi)

Population (31 March 2004)
  - Total: 24,321
  - Density: 76.7/km^{2} (199/sq mi)
- Time zone: UTC+7 (ICT)
- Postal code: 15250
- Geocode: 1609

Khok Charoen (Thai: โคกเจริญ, pronounced [kʰôːk t͡ɕā.rɤ̄ːn]) is a district (amphoe) of Lopburi province, central Thailand.

== History ==
The minor district (king amphoe) was created on 9 March 1987 by splitting off four tambons from Khok Samrong district. It was upgraded to full district status on 4 November 1993.

== Geography ==
Neighboring districts are (from the north clockwise) Phaisali of Nakhon Sawan province, Wichian Buri and Si Thep of Phetchabun province, Chai Badan, Sa Bot, and Nong Muang of Lopburi Province.

== Administration ==
The district is divided into five sub-districts (tambons), which are further subdivided into 53 villages (mubans). There are no municipal (thesaban) areas, and a further five tambon administrative organizations (TAO).

No.	Name	Thai name	Villages	Pop.
1.	Khok Charoen	โคกเจริญ	12	7,275
2.	Yang Rak	ยางราก	12	7,718
3.	Nong Makha	หนองมะค่า	12	3,276
4.	Wang Thong	วังทอง	9	2,591
5.	Khok Samae San	โคกแสมสาร	8	3,461

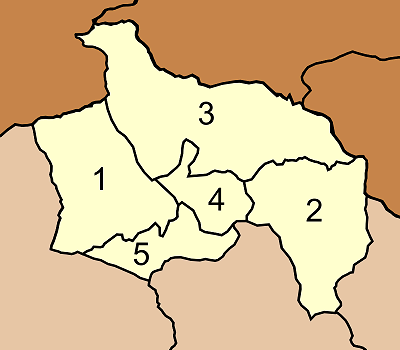
