= Khok Salung railway station =

Railway station in Thailand

Khok Salung โคกสลุง
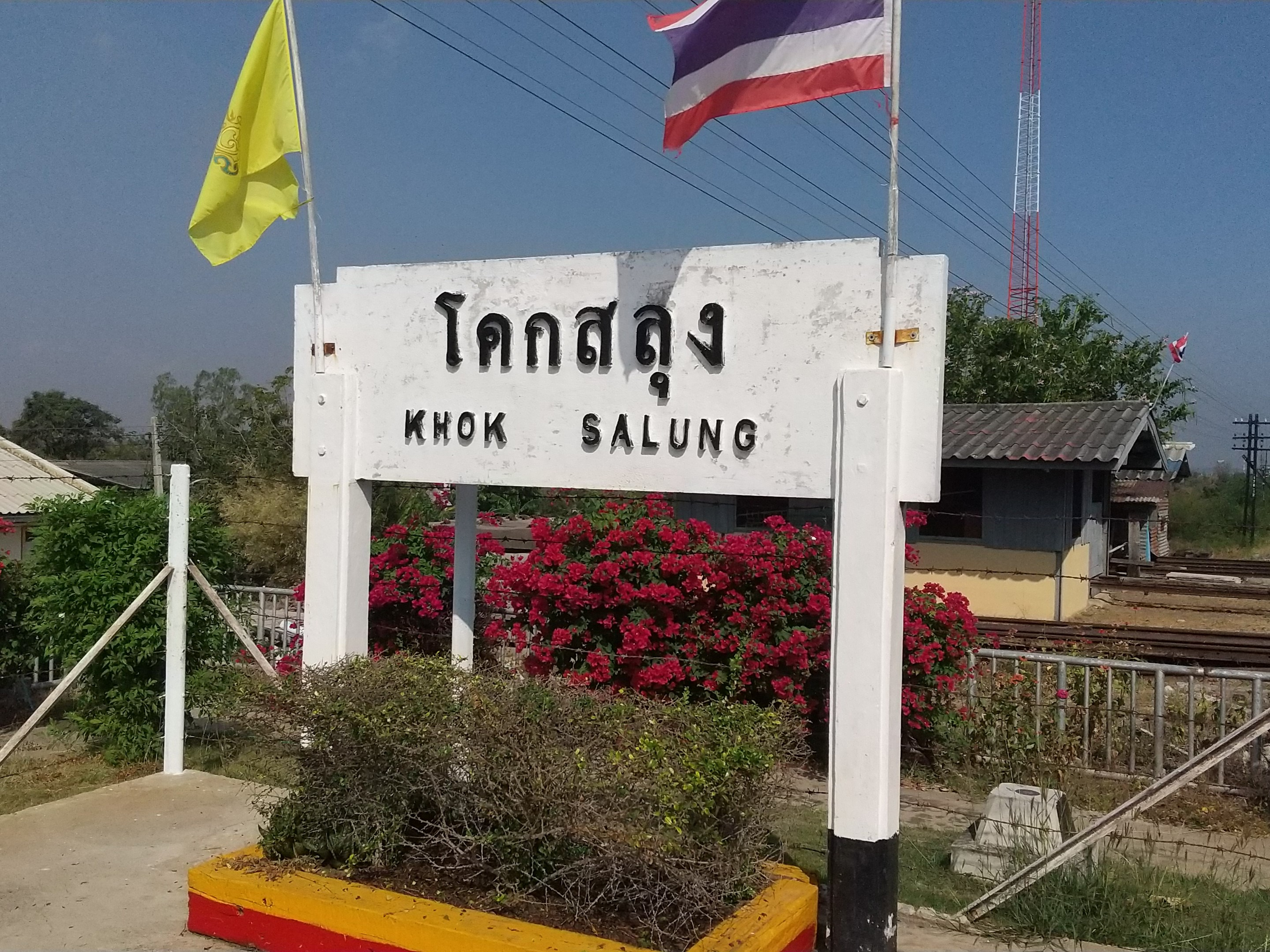
- Signage

General information
- Location: Khok Salung Subdistrict, Phatthana Nikhom District; Lopburi Province; Thailand
- Coordinates: 14.9871°N 101.0230°E
- Operator: State Railway of Thailand
- Line: Lam Narai Branch
- Platforms: 1
- Tracks: 2

Construction
- Structure type: At-grade

Other information
- Station code: คุ.
- Classification: Class 3

History
- Opened: 4 January 1956
- Rebuilt: June 1998

Services
Preceding station	State Railway of Thailand	Following station
Ban Nong Bua Halt towards Kaeng Khoi Junction	Northeastern Line Kaeng Khoi–Bua Yai Branch	Suranarai towards Bua Yai Junction
Location

Khok Salung railway station is a railway station located in Khok Salung Subdistrict, Phatthana Nikhom District, Lopburi Province. It is a class 3 railway station located 176.55 km (109.7 mi) from Bangkok railway station. From November until January of the following year, the Pa Sak Jolasid Dam excursion train from Bangkok runs across the Pa Sak Jolasid Reservoir viaduct and terminates at this station, using it as a switchback for the locomotive for the return trip to dam. During that time, the train will stop for about 30 minutes, so passengers will get off the carriages to use the restroom and buy local products from the folks as souvenirs or for lunch.
