= Suranarai railway station =

Railway station in Thailand

Suranarai สุรนารายณ์
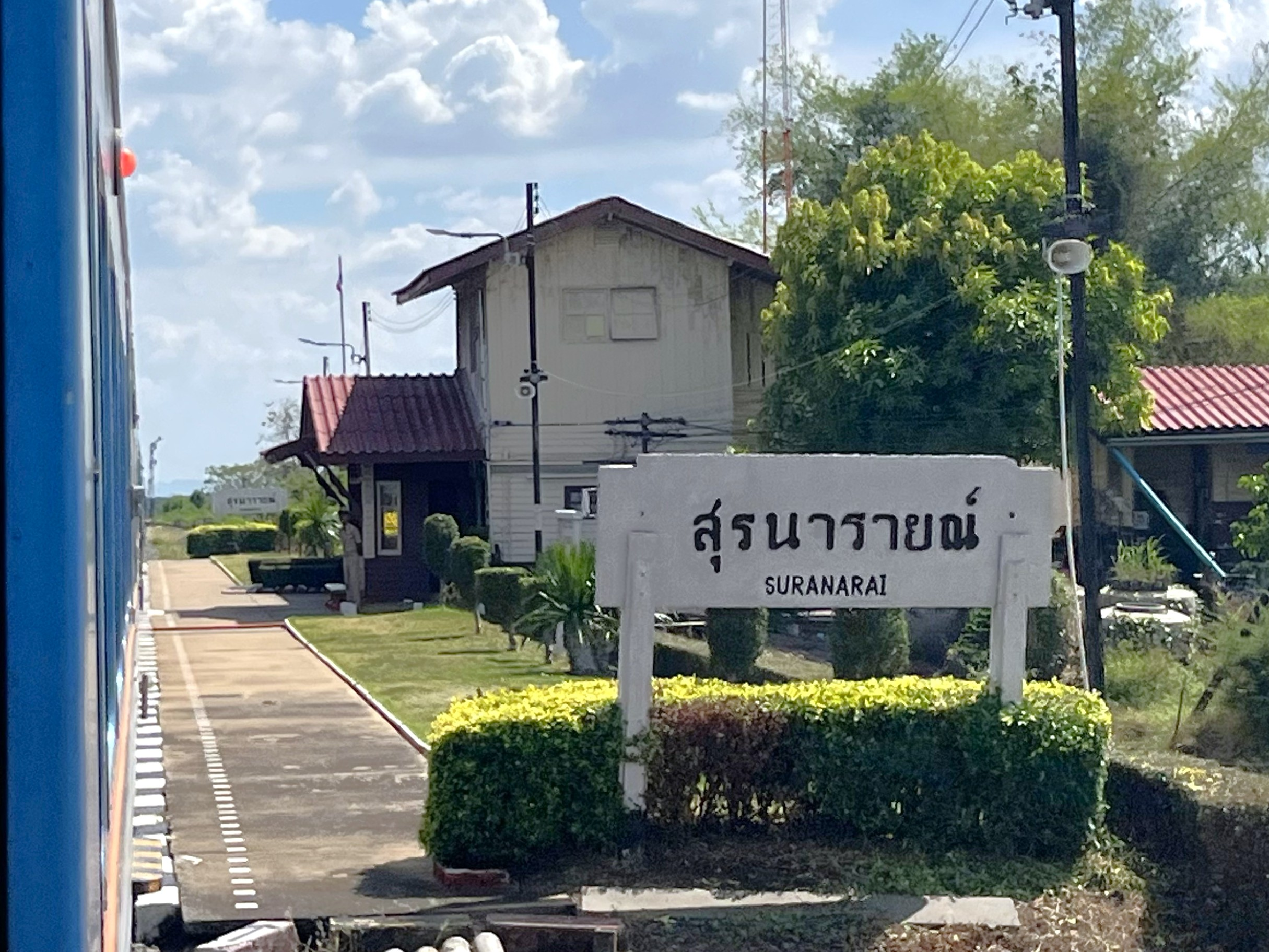
- Station in 2026

General information
- Location: Muang Khom Subdistrict, Chai Badan District; Lopburi Province; Thailand
- Coordinates: 15.0702°N 101.0172°E
- Operator: State Railway of Thailand
- Line: Lam Narai Branch
- Platforms: 1
- Tracks: 2

Construction
- Structure type: At-grade

Other information
- Station code: ะน.
- Classification: Class 3

History
- Opened: 4 January 1956

Services
Preceding station	State Railway of Thailand	Following station
Khok Salung towards Kaeng Khoi Junction	Northeastern Line Kaeng Khoi–Bua Yai Branch	Assumption Convent School Halt towards Bua Yai Junction
Location

Suranarai railway station is a railway station located in Muang Khom Subdistrict, Chai Badan District, Lopburi Province. It is a class 3 railway station located 185.80 km (115.5 mi) from Bangkok railway station. It opened in 1956 as part of the Northeastern Line Kaeng Khoi Junction–Suranarai section.

== Gallery ==
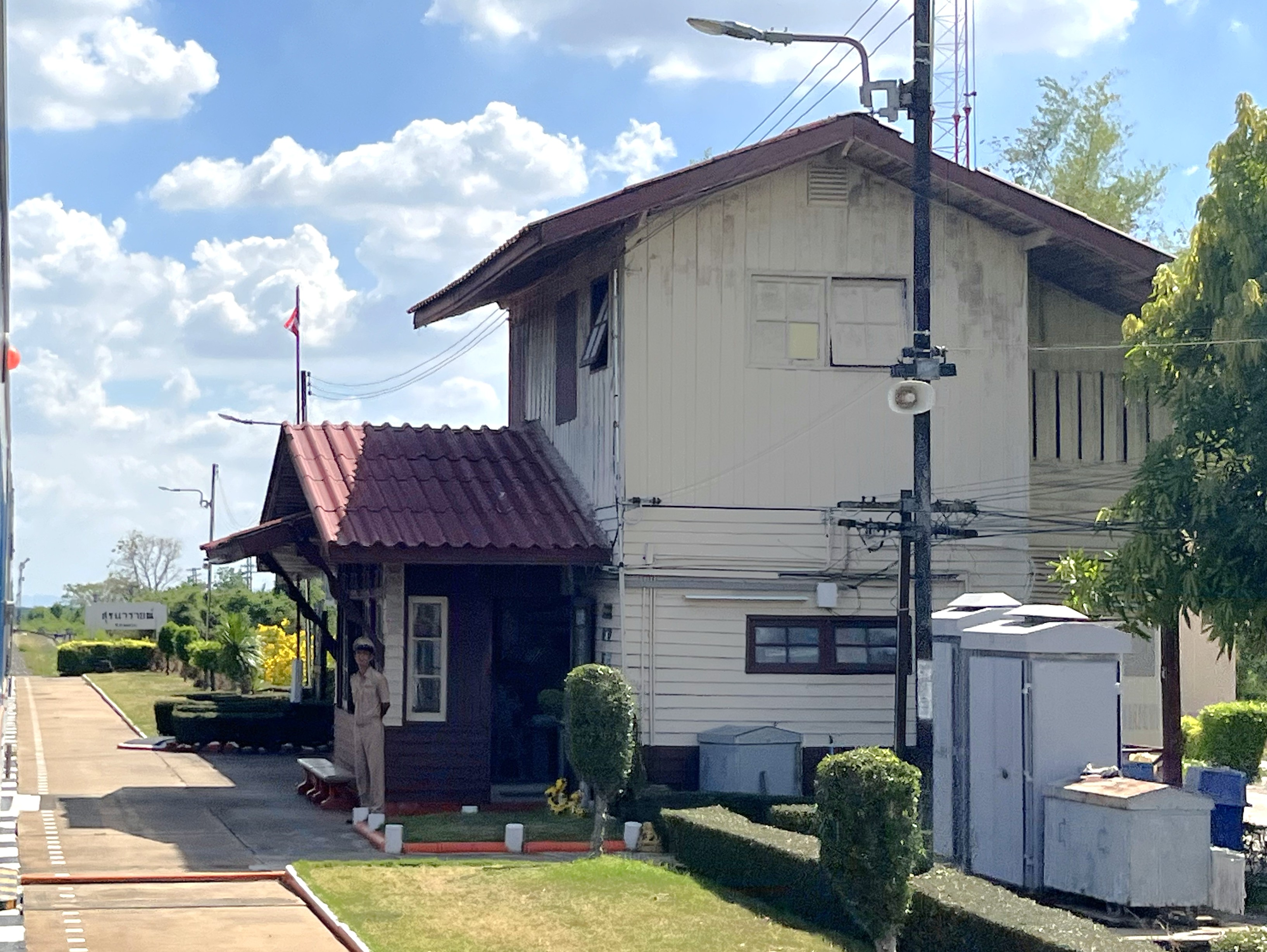
Station building
