= Ban Wa Tabaek (Thep Sathit) railway station =

Railway station in Thailand

Ban Wa Tabaek (Thep Sathit) บ้านวะตะแบก (เทพสถิต)
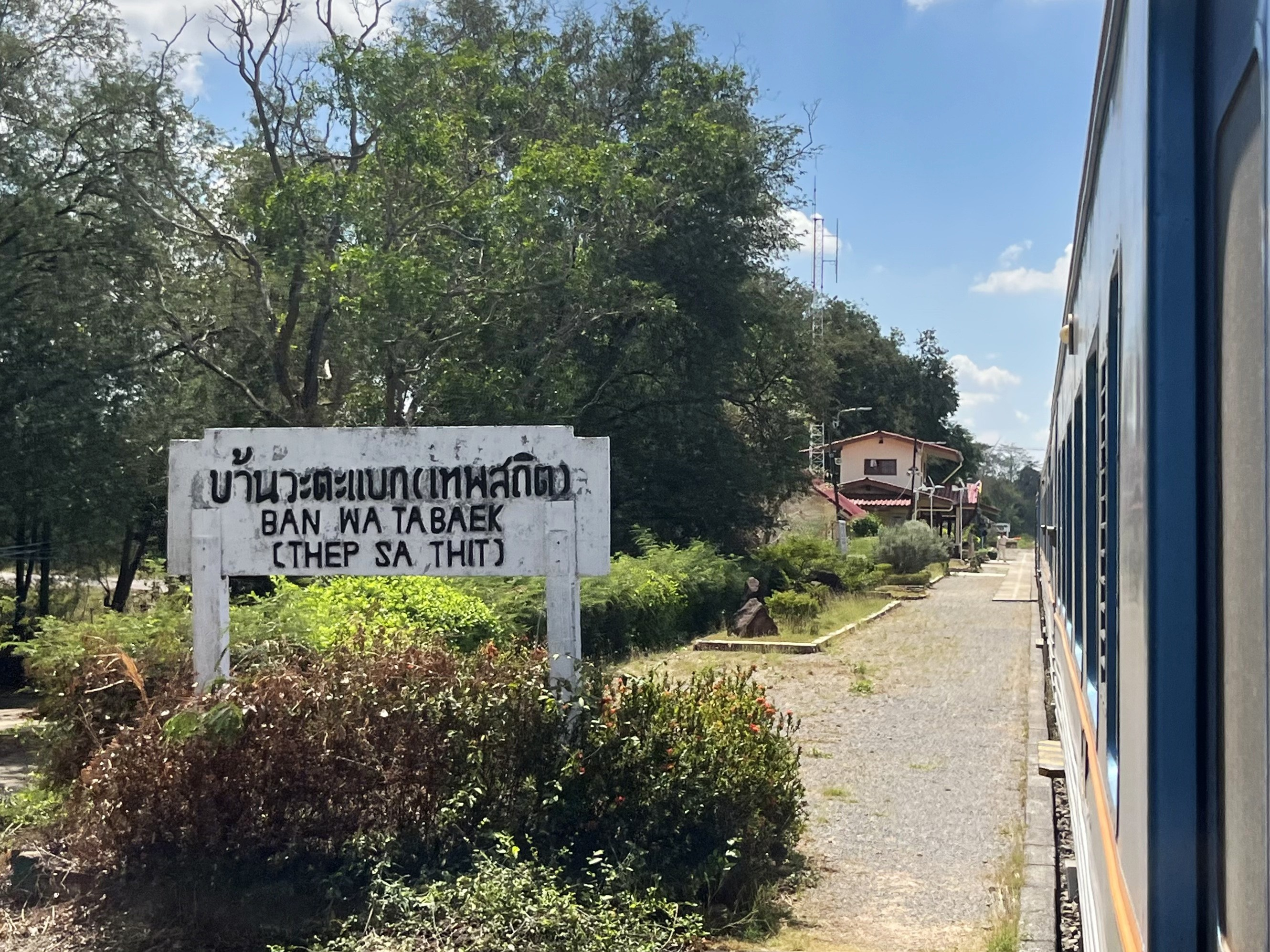
- Station in 2026

General information
- Other names: Thep Sathit เทพสถิต
- Location: Wa Tabaek Subdistrict, Thep Sathit District; Chaiyaphum Province; Thailand
- Coordinates: 15.3972°N 101.4536°E
- Operator: State Railway of Thailand
- Line: Lam Narai Branch
- Platforms: 1
- Tracks: 5

Construction
- Structure type: At-grade

Other information
- Station code: แบ.
- Classification: Class 2

History
- Opened: 19 August 1967

Services
Preceding station	State Railway of Thailand	Following station
Chong Samran towards Kaeng Khoi Junction	Northeastern Line Kaeng Khoi–Bua Yai Branch	Huai Yai Chiu towards Bua Yai Junction
Location

Ban Wa Tabaek station (Thai: สถานีบ้านวะตะแบก), or Thep Sathit station (Thai: สถานีเทพสถิต) is a railway station located in Wa Tabaek Subdistrict, Thep Sathit District, Chaiyaphum Province. It is a class 2 railway station located 263.14 km (163.5 mi) from Bangkok railway station. The station is famed for having the longest official name in Thailand.

== Gallery ==
Station building
