= Phakdi Chumphon district =

Phakdi Chumphon ภักดีชุมพล
- District
- District location in Chaiyaphum province
- Coordinates: 15°54′18″N 101°25′18″E
- Country: Thailand
- Province: Chaiyaphum
- Seat: Chao Thong

Area
  - Total: 900.4 km^{2} (347.6 sq mi)

Population (2000)
  - Total: 28,111
  - Density: 31.2/km^{2} (81/sq mi)
- Time zone: UTC+7 (ICT)
- Postal code: 36260
- Geocode: 3614

Phakdi Chumphon (Thai: ภักดีชุมพล, pronounced [pʰák.dīː tɕʰūm.pʰōn]; Northeastern Thai: ภักดีชุมพล, pronounced [pʰàk.dìː sûm.pʰôn]) is the westernmost district (amphoe) of Chaiyaphum province, northeastern Thailand.

== History ==
Tambons Ban Chiang, Wang Thong, and Chao Thaong of Nong Bua Daeng district were separated to create the minor district (king amphoe) Phakdi Chumphon on 1 August 1988. It was upgraded to a full district on 7 September 1995.

== Geography ==
Neighboring districts are (from the north clockwise): Nong Bua Daeng, Nong Bua Rawe, and Thep Sathit of Chaiyaphum Province, Wichian Buri, Bueng Sam Phan, and Nong Phai of Phetchabun Province and Lam Sonthi of Lopburi Province

== Administration ==
The district is divided into four subdistricts (tambons), which are further subdivided into 47 villages (mubans). There are no municipal (thesaban) areas. There are four tambon administrative organizations (TAO).

1.	Ban Chiang	บ้านเจียง
2.	Chao Thong	เจาทอง
3.	Wang Thong	วังทอง
4.	Laem Thong	แหลมทอง
