= Khok Khli railway station =

Railway station in Thailand

Khok Khli โคกคลี
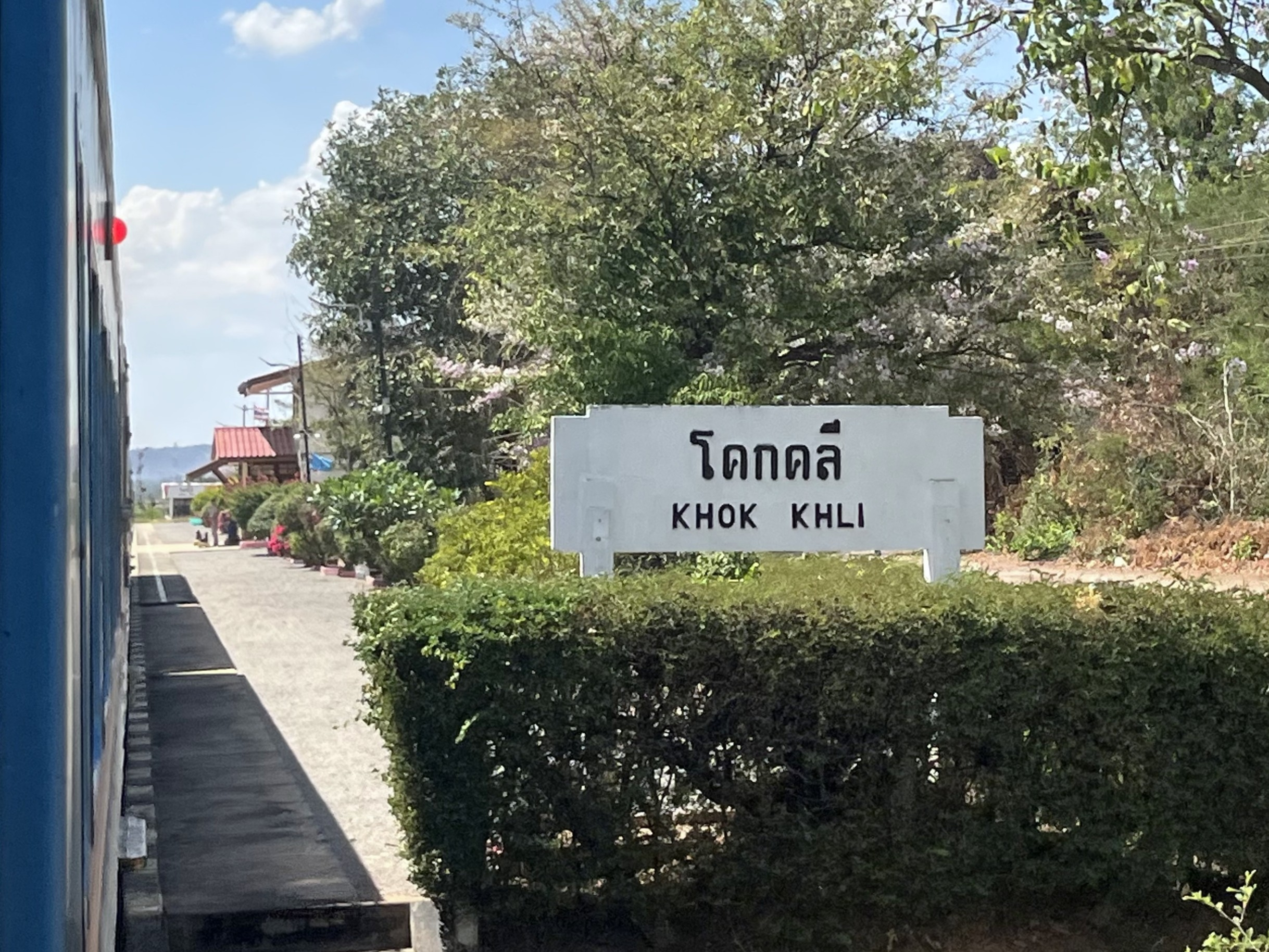
- Station in 2026

General information
- Location: Nong Ri Subdistrict, Lam Sonthi District; Lopburi Province; Thailand
- Coordinates: 15.2746°N 101.3692°E
- Operator: State Railway of Thailand
- Line: Lam Narai Branch Line
- Platforms: 1
- Tracks: 5

Construction
- Structure type: At-grade

Other information
- Station code: คี.
- Classification: Class 3

History
- Opened: 19 August 1967

Services
Preceding station	State Railway of Thailand	Following station
Ban Chongko Halt towards Kaeng Khoi Junction	Northeastern Line Kaeng Khoi–Bua Yai Branch	Chong Samran towards Bua Yai Junction
Location

Khok Khli railway station is a railway station located in Nong Ri Subdistrict, Lam Sonthi District, Lopburi Province. It is a class 3 railway station located 240.87 km (149.7 mi) from Bangkok railway station.

== Gallery ==
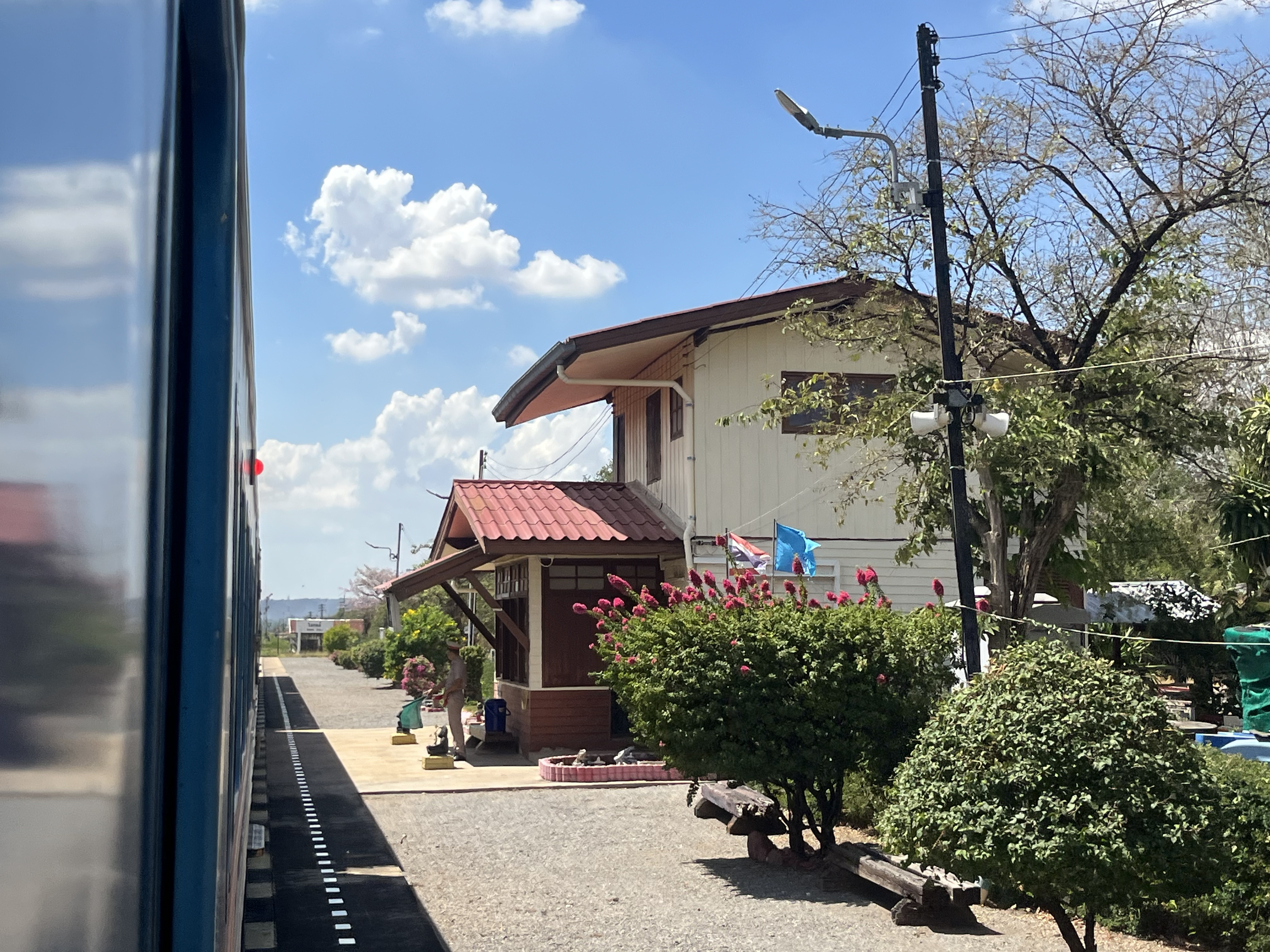
Station building
