= Tha Luang district =

Tha Luang ท่าหลวง
- District
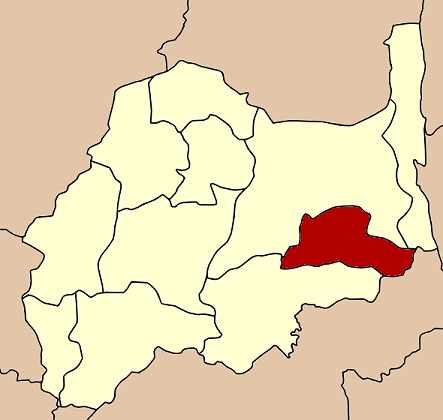
- District location in Lopburi province
- Coordinates: 15°4′6″N 101°6′25″E
- Country: Thailand
- Province: Lopburi
- Seat: Tha Luang
- Tambon: 6
- Muban: 43
- District established: 1978

Area
  - Total: 538.9 km^{2} (208.1 sq mi)

Population (2012)
  - Total: 29,059
  - Density: 52/km^{2} (130/sq mi)
- Time zone: UTC+7 (ICT)
- Postal code: 15130
- Geocode: 1607

Tha Luang (Thai: ท่าหลวง, pronounced [tʰâː lǔa̯ŋ]) is a district (amphoe) in eastern part of Lopburi province, central Thailand.

== History ==
The minor district (king amphoe) was created on 15 November 1978, when the four tambon Tha Luang, Sab Champha, Nong Phak Waen, and Kaeng Phak Kut were split off from Chai Badan district. On 26 May 1989, it was upgraded to full district status.

== Geography ==
The Pa Sak Cholasit reservoir is the main water resource of the district, used for fishery and as well as irrigation.

Neighbouring districts are (from the north clockwise) Chai Badan and Lam Sonthi of Lopburi, Muak Lek of Saraburi province, and Phatthana Nikhom of Lopburi.

== Administration ==
The district is divided into six sub-districts (tambons), which are further subdivided into 43 villages (mubans). Ban Tha Luang has sub-district municipality (thesaban tambon) status and covers parts of tambon Tha Luang. There are six tambon administrative organizations (TAO).

No.	Name	Thai	Pop.
1.	Tha Luang	ท่าหลวง	8,842
2.	Kaeng Phak Kut	แก่งผักกูด	4,092
3.	Sap Champa	ซับจำปา	4,418
4.	Nong Phak Waen	หนองผักแว่น	4,639
5.	Thale Wang Wat	ทะเลวังวัด	1,503
6.	Hua Lam	หัวลำ	5,565
