= Huai Yai Chiu railway station =

Railway station in Thailand

Huai Yai Chiu ห้วยยายจิ๋ว
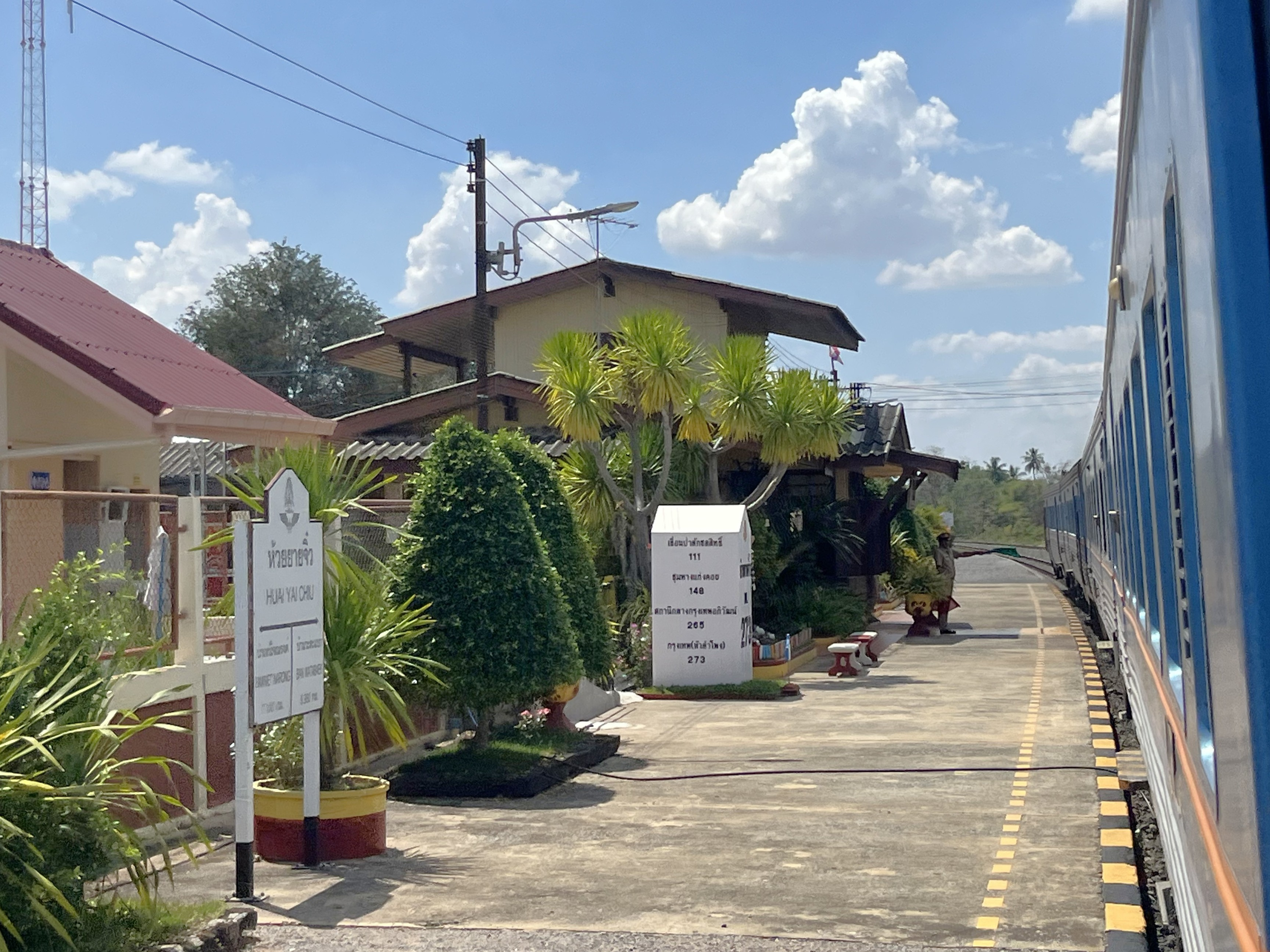
- Station in 2026

General information
- Location: Huai Yai Chiu Subdistrict, Thep Sathit District; Chaiyaphum Province; Thailand
- Coordinates: 15°25′28″N 101°31′52″E
- Operator: State Railway of Thailand
- Line: Lam Narai Branch
- Platforms: 1
- Tracks: 2

Construction
- Structure type: At-grade

Other information
- Station code: จย.
- Classification: Class 3

History
- Opened: 19 August 1967

Services
Preceding station	State Railway of Thailand	Following station
Chong Samran towards Kaeng Khoi Junction	Northeastern Line Kaeng Khoi–Bua Yai Branch	Ban Pak Chap Halt towards Bua Yai Junction
Location

Huai Yai Chiu railway station is a railway station located in Huai Yai Chiu Subdistrict, Thep Sathit District, Chaiyaphum Province. It is a class 3 railway station located 273.13 km (169.7 mi) from Bangkok railway station.
