= Nong Muang district =

Nong Muang หนองม่วง
- District
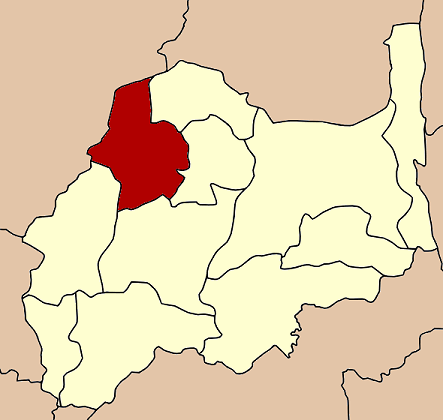
- District location in Lopburi province
- Coordinates: 15°14′50″N 100°39′15″E
- Country: Thailand
- Province: Lopburi
- Seat: Nong Muang

Area
  - Total: 445.5 km^{2} (172.0 sq mi)

Population (2005)
  - Total: 35,257
  - Density: 79.1/km^{2} (205/sq mi)
- Time zone: UTC+7 (ICT)
- Postal code: 15170
- Geocode: 1611

Nong Muang (Thai: หนองม่วง, pronounced [nɔ̌ːŋ mûa̯ŋ]) is a district (amphoe) in the northern part of Lopburi province, central Thailand.

== History ==
Following a suggestion issued in 1989, six tambons were separated from Khok Samrong district to form the new minor district (king amphoe) Nong Muang on 1 April 1990. The minor district was upgraded to full district status on 5 December 1996.

== Geography ==
Neighboring districts are (from the northeast clockwise) Khok Charoen, Sa Bot, Khok Samrong, Ban Mi, and the districts Takhli, Tak Fa and Phaisali of Nakhon Sawan province.

== Administration ==
The district is divided into six sub-districts (tambons), which are further subdivided into 67 villages (mubans). Nong Muang itself has township (thesaban tambon) status and covers part of the tambon Nong Muang. There are six tambon administrative organizations (TAO).

No.	Name	Thai name	Villages	Pop.
1.	Nong Muang	หนองม่วง	10	8,710
2.	Bo Thong	บ่อทอง	12	6,799
3.	Dong Din Daeng	ดงดินแดง	12	5,179
4.	Chon Sombun	ชอนสมบูรณ์	12	4,925
5.	Yang Thon	ยางโทน	10	4,585
6.	Chon Saradet	ชอนสารเดช	11	5,059

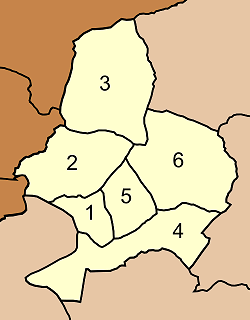
