= Nong Bua Rawe district =

Nong Bua Rawe หนองบัวระเหว
- District
- District location in Chaiyaphum province
- Coordinates: 15°44′55″N 101°45′34″E
- Country: Thailand
- Province: Chaiyaphum
- Seat: Nong Bua Rawe
- District established: 1978

Area
  - Total: 841.8 km^{2} (325.0 sq mi)

Population (2008)
  - Total: 36,371
  - Density: 43.2/km^{2} (112/sq mi)
- Time zone: UTC+7 (ICT)
- Postal code: 36250
- Geocode: 3608

Nong Bua Rawe (Thai: หนองบัวระเหว, pronounced [nɔ̌ːŋ būa rā.wěː], Northeastern Thai: หนองบัวระเหว, pronounced [nɔ̌ːŋ bùa lā.wěː]) is a district (amphoe) of Chaiyaphum province, northeastern Thailand.

== History ==
The area was originally a tambon of Chatturat district. It was separated and together with tambon Wang Takhe became a minor district (king amphoe) on 17 April 1978. It was upgraded to a full district on 1 January 1988.

== Geography ==
Neighboring districts are (from the north clockwise) Nong Bua Daeng, Ban Khwao, Chatturat, Sap Yai, Thep Sathit, and Phakdi Chumphon.

Sai Thong National Park is in the district.

== Administration ==
The district is divided into five subdistricts (tambons), which are further subdivided into 58 villages (mubans). There are three subdistrict municipalities (thesaban tambons), each covering the whole same-named subdistrict: Nong Bua Tawe, Huai Yae, and Khok Sa-at. The remaining two subdistricts have a tambon administrative organization (TAO).

No.	Name	Thai	Pop.
1.	Nong Bua Rawe	หนองบัวระเหว	5,892
2.	Wang Takhe	วังตะเฆ่	13,680
3.	Huai Yae	ห้วยแย้	7,104
4.	Khok Sa-at	โคกสะอาด	5,602
5.	Sok Pla Duk	โสกปลาดุก	4,093
