= Phaisali district =

Phaisali ไพศาลี
- District
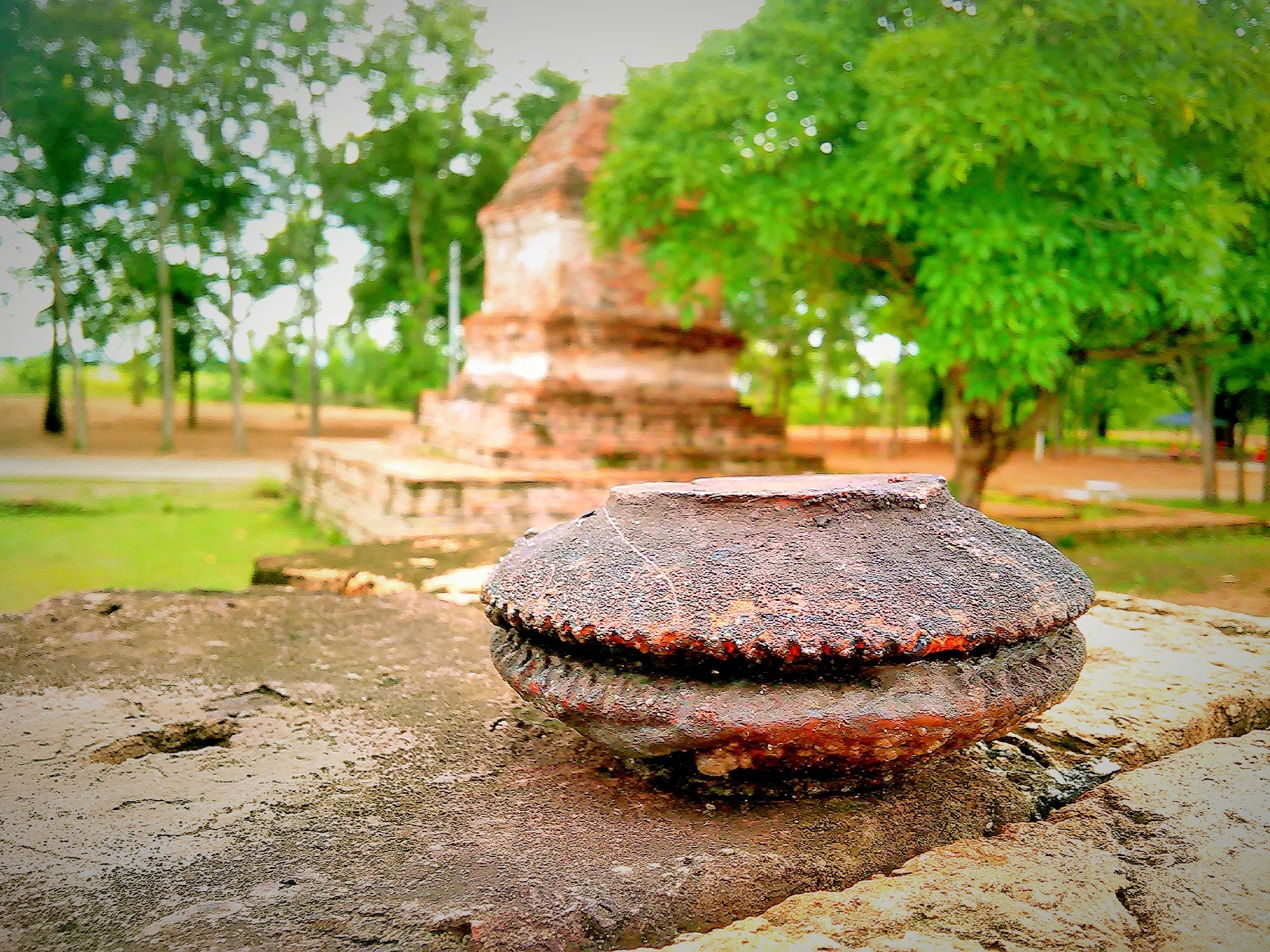
- Wesali, the ancient city of Phaisali

- District location in Nakhon Sawan province
- Coordinates: 15°35′51″N 100°39′29″E
- Country: Thailand
- Province: Nakhon Sawan
- Seat: Phaisali

Area
  - Total: 979.5 km^{2} (378.2 sq mi)

Population (2005)
  - Total: 70,799
  - Density: 72.28/km^{2} (187.2/sq mi)
- Time zone: UTC+7 (ICT)
- Postal code: 60220
- Geocode: 6009

Phaisali (Thai: ไพศาลี, pronounced [pʰāj.sǎː.līː]) is a district (amphoe) in the eastern part of Nakhon Sawan province, Thailand.

== History ==
Phaisali or locally well known as Khok Duea, is an ancient city, as proven by Khmer remains in Tambon Samrong Chai. There were also prehistoric burial sites found in Tambon Pho Prasat and Na Khom, contemporary with the famous Ban Chiang.

The district was created as a minor district (king amphoe) on 1 January 1962, with the three tambons Samrong Chai, Khok Duea, and Takhro from Tha Tako district. It was upgraded to a full district on 27 July 1965.

== Geography ==
Neighboring districts are (from the north clockwise): Nong Bua of Nakhon Sawan Province; Bueng Sam Phan and Wichian Buri of Phetchabun province; Khok Charoen, and Nong Muang of Lopburi province; and Tak Fa and Tha Tako of Nakhon Sawan.

== Administration ==
The district is divided into eight sub-districts (tambons), which are further subdivided into 101 villages (mubans). Phaisali is a township (thesaban tambon) covering parts of tambons Phaisali and Khok Duea. There are a further eight tambon administrative organizations (TAO).

No.	Name	Thai name	Villages	Pop.
1.	Khok Duea	โคกเดื่อ	9	7,091
2.	Samrong Chai	สำโรงชัย	20	11,222
3.	Wang Nam Lat	วังน้ำลัด	10	8,003
4.	Takhro	ตะคร้อ	18	11,817
5.	Pho Prasat	โพธิ์ประสาท	13	6,564
6.	Wang Khoi	วังข่อย	11	7,783
7.	Na Khom	นาขอม	11	5,697
8.	Phaisali	ไพศาลี	9	12,622
