= Sa Bot district =

Sa Bot สระโบสถ์
- District
- District location in Lopburee province
- Coordinates: 15°11′43″N 100°50′55″E
- Country: Thailand
- Province: Lopburee
- Seat: Niyom Chai

Area
  - Total: 304.65 km^{2} (117.63 sq mi)

Population (2005)
  - Total: 21,279
  - Density: 698/km^{2} (1,810/sq mi)
- Time zone: UTC+7 (ICT)
- Postal code: 15240
- Geocode: 1608

Sa Bot (Thai: สระโบสถ์, pronounced [sàʔ bòːt]) is a district (amphoe) in the northern part of Lopburee province, central Thailand.

== History ==
The minor district (king amphoe) was created on 5 June 1981, by separating tambons Sa Bot, Maha Phot, and Tha Thung Chang of Khok Samrong district. It was upgraded to full district status on 1 January 1988.

== Geography ==
Neighbouring districts are (from the north clockwise) Khok Charoen, Chai Badan, Khok Samrong and Nong Muang.

== Administration ==
The district is divided into five sub-districts (tambons), which are further subdivided into 46 villages (mubans). Sa Bot itself has township (thesaban tambon) status and covers all of the tambon Sa Bot. There are three tambon administrative organizations (TAO): Sa Bot, Maha Phot and Niyom Chai.

No.	Name	Thai name	Villages	Pop.
1.	Sa Bot	สระโบสถ์		7,616
2.	Maha Phot	มหาโพธิ		4,757
3.	Thung Tha Chang	ทุ่งท่าช้าง		2,029
4.	Huai Yai	ห้วยใหญ่		1,553
5.	Niyom Chai	นิยมชัย		5,324
