= Lam Sonthi district =

Lam Sonthi ลำสนธิ
- District
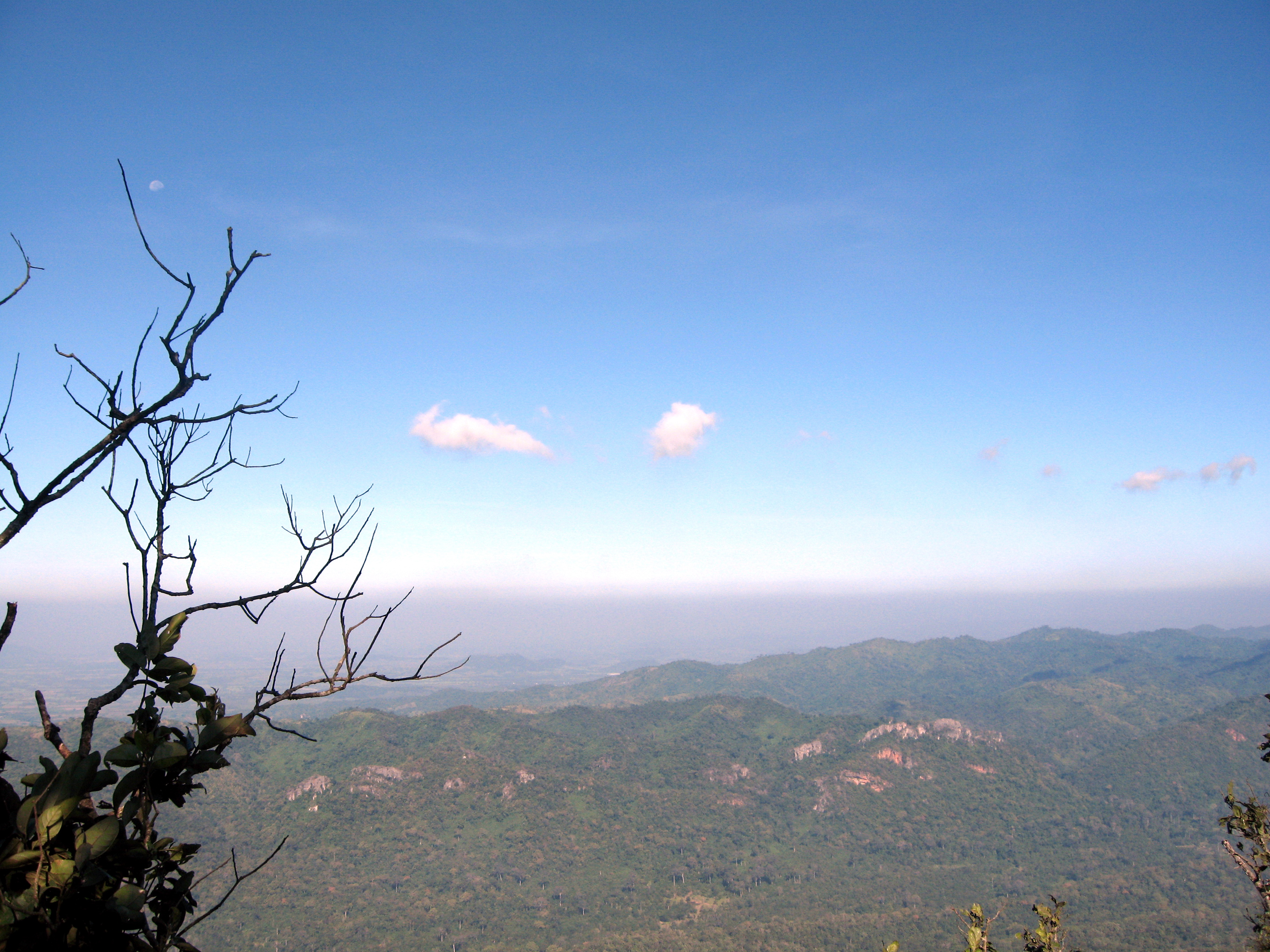

- District location in Lopburi province
- Coordinates: 15°18′6″N 101°21′48″E
- Country: Thailand
- Province: Lopburi
- Seat: Lam Sonthi
- Tambon: 6
- Muban: 49

Area
  - Total: 447.0 km^{2} (172.6 sq mi)

Population (2012)
  - Total: 34,480
  - Density: 77.1/km^{2} (200/sq mi)
- Time zone: UTC+7 (ICT)
- Postal code: 15190
- Geocode: 1610

Lam Sonthi (Thai: ลำสนธิ, pronounced [lām sǒn.tʰíʔ]) is the easternmost district (amphoe) of Lopburi province, central Thailand.

== History ==
Lam Sonthi was created as a minor district (king amphoe) on 1 April 1989, by splitting off five tambons from the district Chai Badan district. It was upgraded to a full district on 5 December 1996. The sixth tambon, Khao Noi, was created in 1994.

== Geography ==
The name Lam Sonthi comes from the small Sonthi River that originates in the Sap Langka Wildlife Sanctuary, the last forest of Lopburi, in Tambon Kut Ta Phet, in the very north of the district.

Neighboring districts are (from the north clockwise) Si Thep and Wichian Buri of Phetchabun province, Thep Sathit of Chaiyaphum province, Thepharak, Dan Khun Thot and Sikhio of Nakhon Ratchasima province, Muak Lek of Saraburi province, and Tha Luang and Chai Badan of Lopburi Province.

To the east the district boundary is formed by the Phang Hoei ridge, while the boundary in the northwest is formed by the Luak ridge, both ridges part of the Phetchabun Mountains.

== Administration ==
The district is divided into six sub-districts (tambons), which are further subdivided into 49 villages (mubans). There are no municipal (thesaban) areas, and a further four tambon administrative organizations (TAO).

| No. | Name | Thai | Villages | Pop. |
|---|---|---|---|---|
| 1. | Lam Sonthi | ลำสนธิ | 6 | 3,376 |
| 2. | Sap Sombun | ซับสมบูรณ์ | 7 | 3,569 |
| 3. | Nong Ri | หนองรี | 13 | 7,660 |
| 4. | Kut Ta Phet | กุดตาเพชร | 12 | 6,296 |
| 5. | Khao Ruak | เขารวก | 6 | 2,476 |
| 6. | Khao Noi | เขาน้อย | 5 | 3,273 |

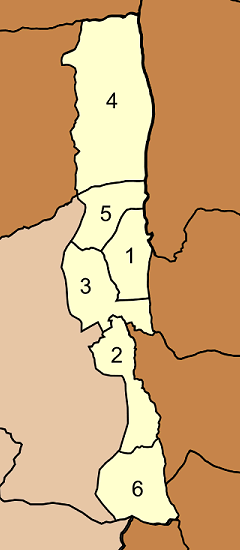
