= Chong Samran railway station =

Railway station in Thailand

Chong Samran ช่องสำราญ
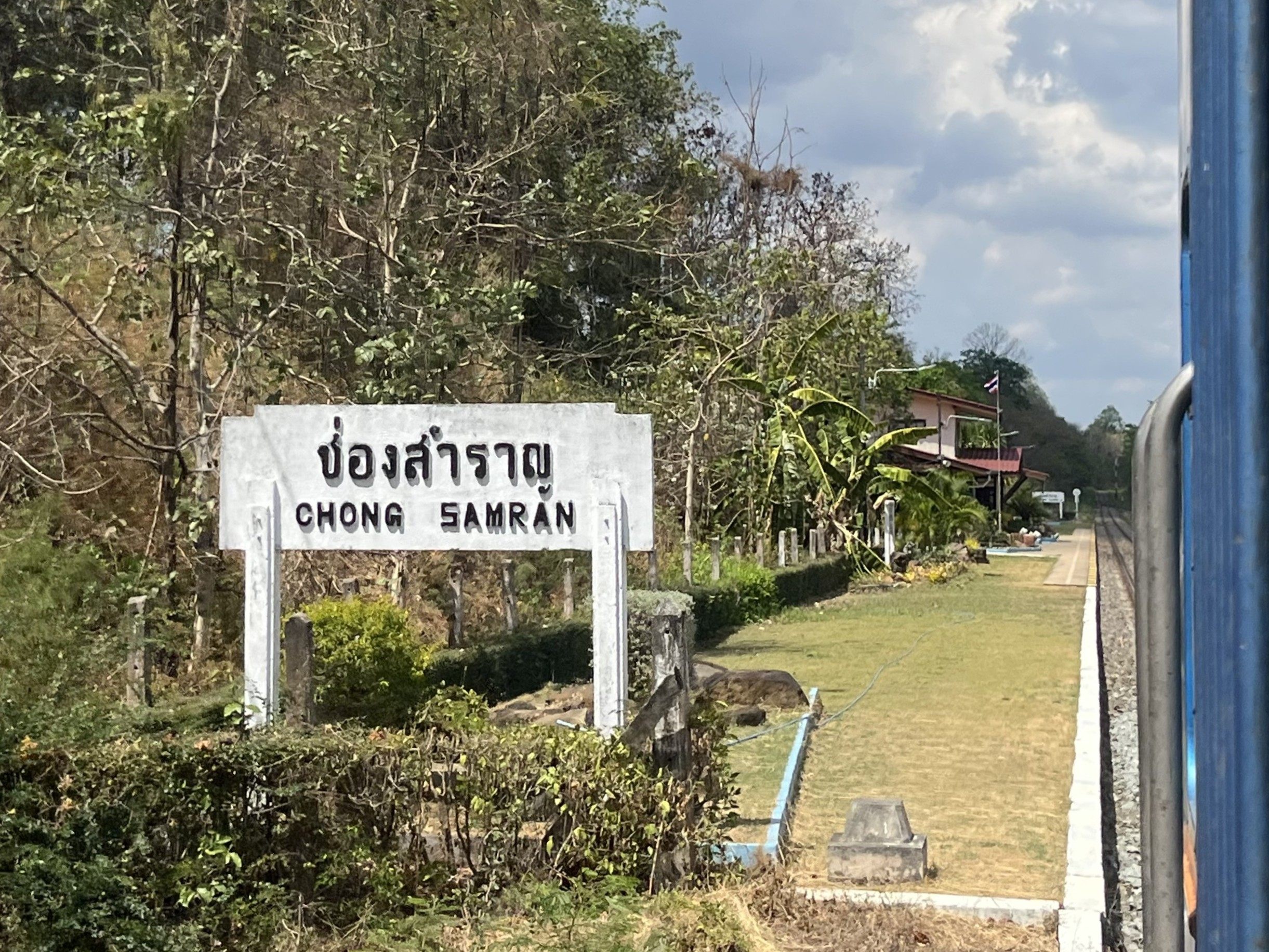
- Station in 2026

General information
- Location: Wa Tabaek Subdistrict, Thep Sathit District; Chaiyaphum Province; Thailand
- Coordinates: 15.3521°N 101.3869°E
- Operator: State Railway of Thailand
- Line: Lam Narai Branch
- Platforms: 1
- Tracks: 3

Construction
- Structure type: At-grade

Other information
- Station code: อช.
- Classification: Class 3

History
- Opened: 19 August 1967

Services
Preceding station	State Railway of Thailand	Following station
Khok Khli towards Kaeng Khoi Junction	Northeastern Line Kaeng Khoi–Bua Yai Branch	Ban Wa Tabaek (Thep Sathit) towards Bua Yai Junction
Location

Chong Samran station (Thai: สถานีช่องสำราญ) is a railway station located in Wa Tabaek Subdistrict, Thep Sathit District, Chaiyaphum Province. It is a class 3 railway station located 250.64 km (155.7 mi) from Bangkok railway station.

== Gallery ==
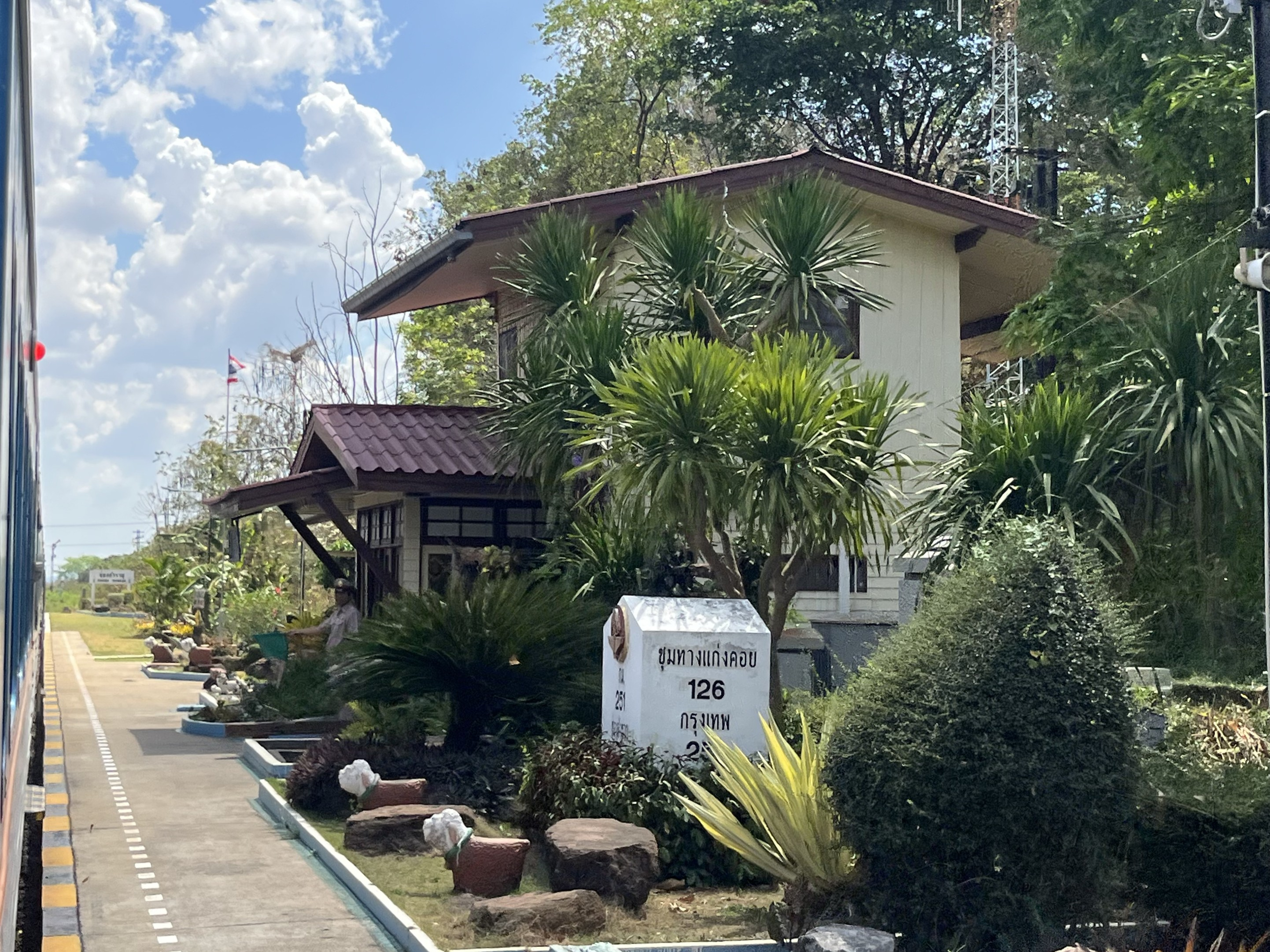
Station building
