= Si Thep district =

Si Thep ศรีเทพ
- District
- District location in Phetchabun province
- Coordinates: 15°27′12″N 101°4′2″E
- Country: Thailand
- Province: Phetchabun
- Seat: Khok Sa-at

Area
  - Total: 810.0 km^{2} (312.7 sq mi)

Population (2000)
  - Total: 63,300
  - Density: 78.1/km^{2} (202/sq mi)
- Time zone: UTC+7 (ICT)
- Postal code: 67170
- Geocode: 6706

Si Thep (Thai: ศรีเทพ, pronounced [sǐː tʰêːp]) is the southernmost district (amphoe) of Phetchabun province, Thailand, in the valley of the Pa Sak River. Si Thep, is Thailand’s latest World Heritage Sites, and Thailand's largest ancient city.

== History ==
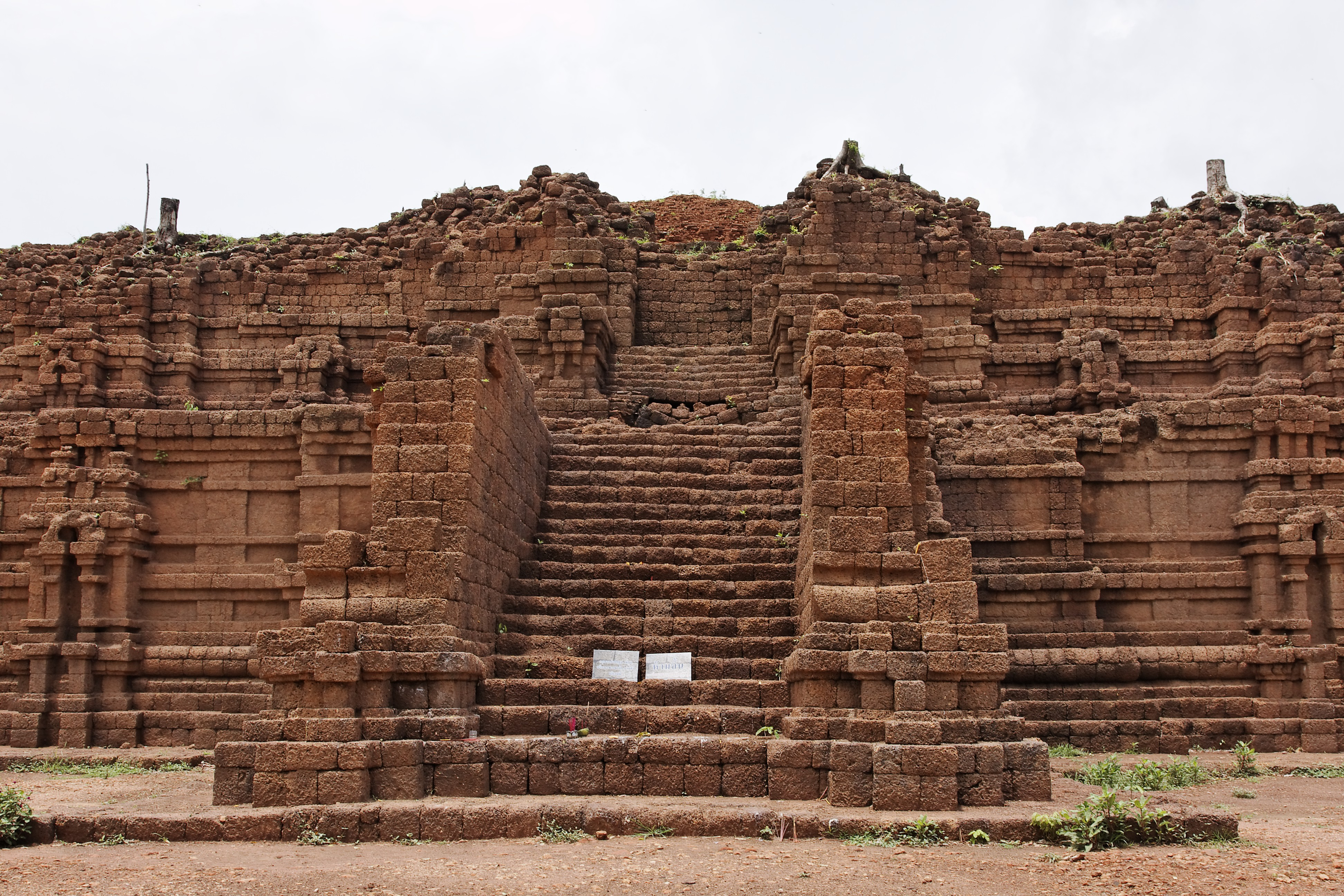
Khao Khlang Nok, was an ancient Dvaravati-style stupa, dated back around 8th-9th century CE, at present, it is large laterite base.

The district was created on 13 December 1970 as a minor district (king amphoe) with territory from Wichian Buri district. It was upgraded to Si Thep District on 8 August 1976.

The ancient city of Si Thep was built in the Dvaravati era. Prince Damrong found the area of the old city in 1905 when he visited Monthon Phetchabun. It is now Si Thep Historical Park. The city yielded K. 499, one of the oldest Sanskrit stone inscriptions from Thailand, which records puṇya or meritorious work in a Brahmanical setting. Two images of Kṛṣṇa Govardhanadhāra of about the late sixth and the late seventh century were also found there.

== Geography ==
Si Thep is on a dry highland surrounded by waterways and floodplains bordered by mountains on both sides. To ensure sufficient water for city use, ancient Si Thep had an elaborate system of ponds, tank moats, and a hydraulic system to bring water from higher grounds to sustain the city.

Neighboring districts are (from the north clockwise) Wichian Buri of Phetchabun Province, and Lam Sonthi, Chai Badan, and Khok Charoen of Lopburi province.

== Administration ==
The district is divided into seven sub-districts (tambons), which are further subdivided into 93 villages (mubans). The township (thesaban tambon) Sawang Watthana covers parts of tambon Sa Kruat. There are seven tambon administrative organizations (TAO).

No.	Name	Thai name	Villages	Pop.
1.	Si Thep	ศรีเทพ	15	10,465
2.	Sa Kruat	สระกรวด	17	15,731
3.	Khlong Krachang	คลองกระจัง	18	13,554
4.	Na Sanun	นาสนุ่น	20	11,011
5.	Khok Sa-at	โคกสะอาด	13	6,748
6.	Nong Yang Thoi	หนองย่างทอย	12	9,353
7.	Pradu Ngam	ประดู่งาม	8	3,024
