= Phatthana Nikhom district =

Phatthana Nikhom พัฒนานิคม
- District
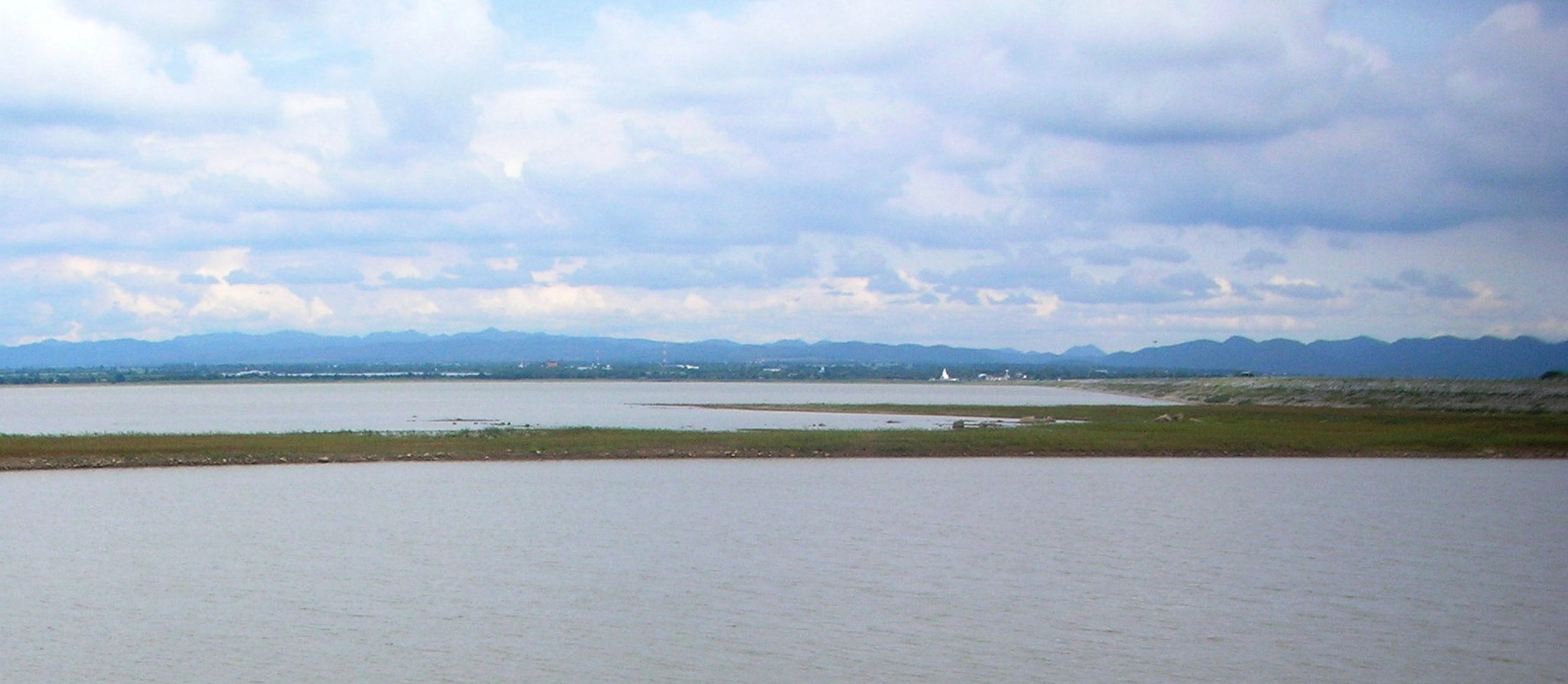
- Dong Phaya Yen Range as seen from Pa Sak Cholasit Dam

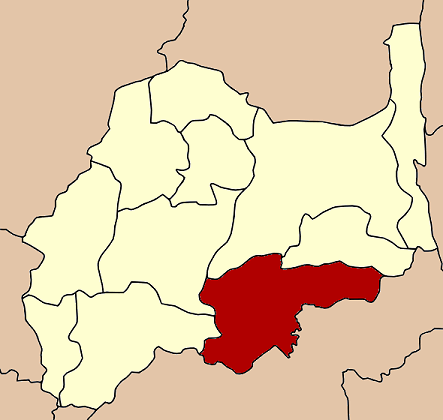
- District location in Lopburi province
- Coordinates: 14°51′21″N 100°59′24″E
- Country: Thailand
- Province: Lopburi
- Seat: Phatthana Nikhom

Area
  - Total: 517.0 km^{2} (199.6 sq mi)

Population (2005)
  - Total: 61,306
  - Density: 118.6/km^{2} (307/sq mi)
- Time zone: UTC+7 (ICT)
- Postal code: 15140
- Geocode: 1602

Phatthana Nikhom (Thai: พัฒนานิคม, pronounced [pʰát.tʰā.nāː ní(ʔ).kʰōm]) is a district (amphoe) in Lopburi province, located in central Thailand.

== Geography ==
Sunflower fields, Phatthana Nikhom

Neighboring districts are (from the north clockwise) Chai Badan and Tha Luang of Lopburi Province, Muak Lek, Wang Muang, Kaeng Khoi, Chaloem Phra Kiat and Phra Phutthabat of Saraburi province, and Mueang Lopburi and Khok Samrong of Lopburi.

The Pa Sak Cholasit Dam that stops the Pa Sak River is in this district. Phatthana Nikhom is a favorite tourist stop due to its winter sunflower fields.

== History ==
The district was created during the premiership of Field Marshal Plaek Phibunsongkhram.

The minor district (king amphoe) was created on 23 February 1962, when the five tambon Di Lang, Manao Wan, Khok Salung, Chong Sarika, and Nong Bua were split off from Mueang Lopburi district. It was upgraded to a full district on 16 July 1963.

== Administration ==
The district is divided into nine sub-districts (tambons), which are further subdivided into 88 villages (mubans). There are two townships (thesaban tambon): Phatthana Nikhom covering parts of tambons Phatthana Nikhom and Kaeng Suea Ten covering parts of tambon Nong Bua. There are a further nine tambon administrative organizations (TAO).

No.	Name	Thai name	Villages	Pop.
1.	Phatthana Nikhom	พัฒนานิคม	14	12,293
2.	Chong Sarika	ช่องสาริกา	13	6,770
3.	Manao Wan	มะนาวหวาน	7	4,235
4.	Di Lang	ดีลัง	7	7,220
5.	Khok Salung	โคกสลุง	11	11,150
6.	Chon Noi	ชอนน้อย	6	2,529
7.	Nong Bua	หนองบัว	11	6,014
8.	Huai Khun Ram	ห้วยขุนราม	11	6,818
9.	Nam Sut	น้ำสุด	8	4,277
