= Pa Sak Jolasid Dam =

Pa Sak Cholasit Dam
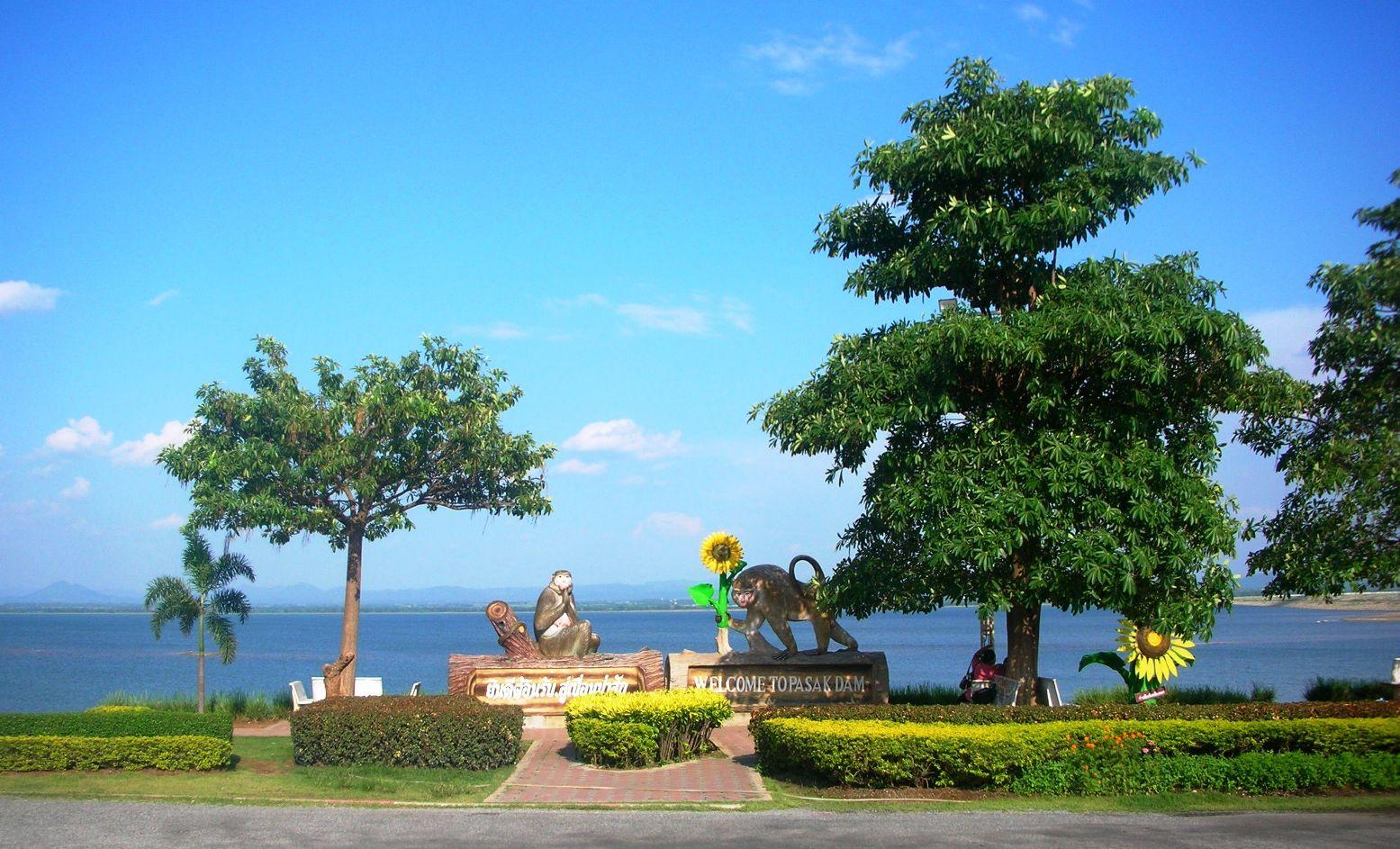
- Pa Sak Cholasit Dam with the Dong Phaya Yen Range in the background

- Location within Thailand
- Country: Thailand
- Location: Phatthana Nikhom, Lopburi with Wang Muang, Saraburi
- Coordinates: 14°51′41″N 101°03′58″E
- Status: Operational
- Construction began: 1991
- Opening date: 1999

Dam and spillways
- Type of dam: Embankment, earth-fill
- Impounds: Pa Sak River
- Height: 36.5 m (120 ft)
- Length: 4,860 m (15,940 ft)

Reservoir
- Total capacity: 960,000,000 m^{3} (778,285 acre⋅ft)

Power Station
- Installed capacity: 6.7 MW

The Pa Sak Jolasid Dam or Pa Sak Cholasit Dam (Thai: เขื่อนป่าสักชลสิทธิ์, RTGS: Khuean Pa Sak Chonlasit pronounced [kʰɯ̀a̯n pàː sàk t͡ɕʰōn.lā.sìt]) impounds the Pa Sak River at Ban Kaeng Suea Ten, Tambon Nong Bua, Phatthana Nikhom District, Lopburi Province, and Ban Kham Phran, Tambon Kham Phran, Wang Muang District, Saraburi Province, Thailand. It is the biggest reservoir in central Thailand.

The 4,860-meter (15,940 ft) wide and 36.5-meter (120 ft) high dam is earth-filled with an impervious core. The storage capacity is 785 million m^{3} of water at normal water level, with a maximum capacity of 960 million m^{3}. The dam also supplies about 6.7 MW of hydro-electric power.

== History ==
The Pa Sak Cholasit Dam Project is one of the major irrigation projects of Thailand, providing water to the plantations in the Pa Sak valley and lower Chao Phraya valley. The dam also decreases problems of water management in Bangkok by permitting more flood control, as the Pa Sak river was one of the main sources of flooding in the Bangkok metropolitan area.

King Bhumibol Adulyadej initiated a project to develop the Pa Sak River valley and lower Chao Phraya valley on 19 February 1989 as part of the Maenam Pa Sak Royal Development Project. On 4 July 1991 Prime Minister Anand Panyarachun set up a study group for the dam project. Princess Maha Chakri Sirindhorn presided over a royal ceremony on 15 June 1998, starting the storing of water in the reservoir.

On 20 October 1991 King Bhumibol Adulyadej gave the dam its official name, Pa Sak Cholasit. The king also presided over the inauguration of the dam on 25 November 1999. The park is now also a tourist attraction .

== Railway and tourism ==
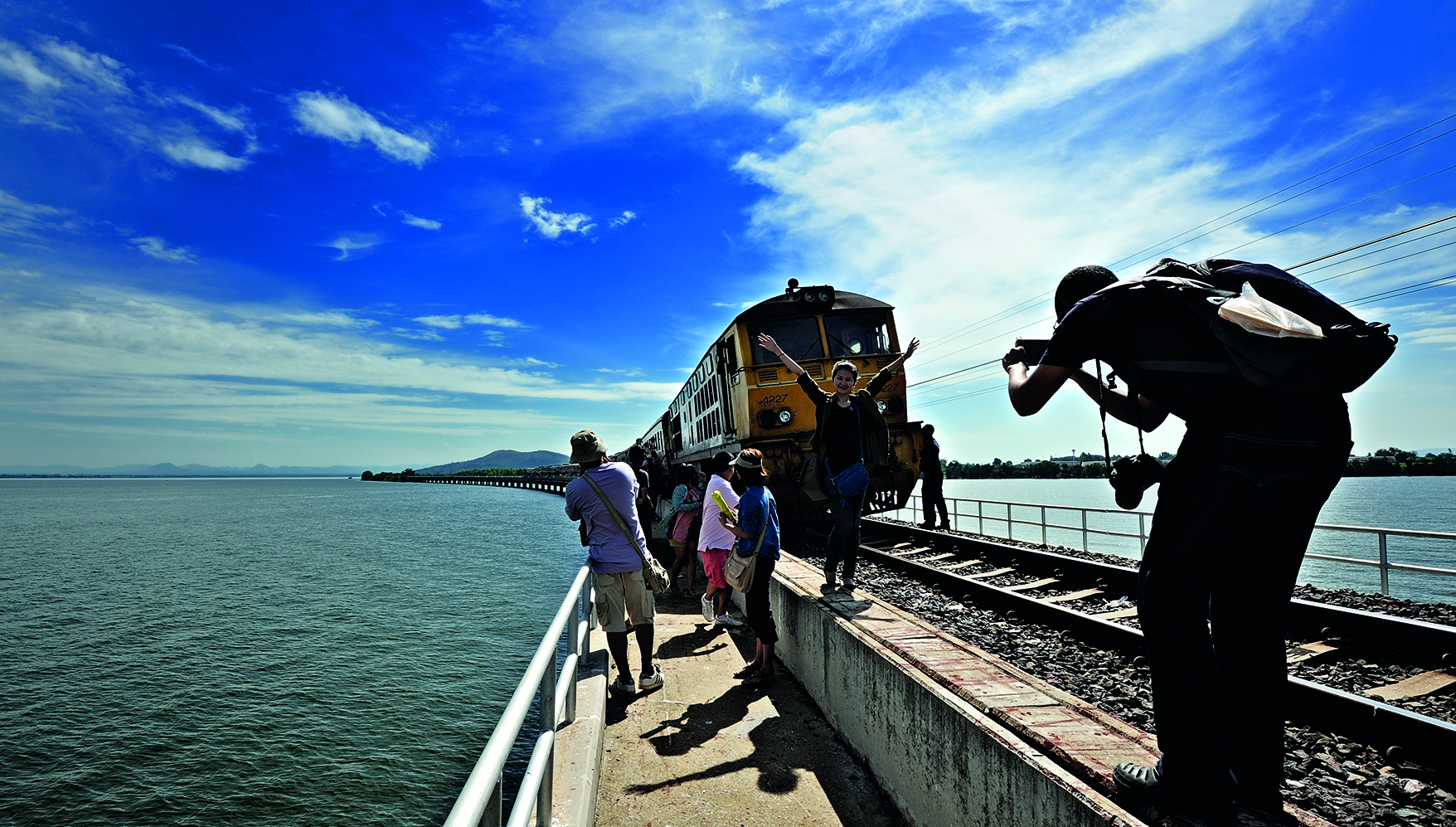
An excursion train stops on the dam ridge for tourists to take pictures and take a walk

The construction of the dam meant that the original line of the Northeastern Line Kaeng Khoi-Bua Yai Branch Line would be submerged under the reservoir. Therefore a railway viaduct was constructed in 1998 as a realignment of the line. It opened on 15 June 1998, along with the Pa Sak Jolasid Dam Railway Halt which was constructed to boost tourism in the area.

From November to January each year (except during the New Year holidays), the State Railway of Thailand (SRT) operates a special train service on weekends from Bangkok to Pa Sak Jolasid Dam. The train stops on the railway viaduct, allowing passengers to stroll and take pictures.

The muban (village) Ban Tha Rit at the end of the dam is a popular tourist site.
