= Khok Samrong district =

Khok Samrong โคกสำโรง
- District
- District location in Lopburi province
- Coordinates: 15°4′11″N 100°43′26″E
- Country: Thailand
- Province: Lopburi

Area
  - Total: 982.5 km^{2} (379.3 sq mi)

Population (2000)
  - Total: 86,381
  - Density: 87.9/km^{2} (228/sq mi)
- Time zone: UTC+7 (ICT)
- Postal code: 15120
- Geocode: 1603

Khok Samrong (Thai: โคกสำโรง, pronounced [kʰôːk sǎm.rōːŋ]) is a district (amphoe) of Lopburi province in central Thailand. The district is the transportation hub of the province. Kasetsart University's Lopburi campus is in Tambon Phaniat, Khok Samrong District.

== History ==
Originally named Phu Kha, the minor district (king amphoe) was renamed Sa Bot in 1909. In 1915 it became a full district and renamed Khok Samrong, as the district office was relocated there.

== Geography ==
Neighbouring districts are (from the north clockwise) Nong Muang, Sa Bot, Chai Badan, Phatthana Nikhom, Mueang Lopburi and Ban Mi.

== Administration ==
The district is divided into 13 sub-districts (tambons), which are further subdivided into 137 villages (mubans). The township (thesaban tambon) Khok Samrong covers parts of the tambon Khok Samrong. There are a further 13 tambon administrative organizations (TAO).

1.	Khok Samrong	โคกสำโรง
2.	Ko Kaeo	เกาะแก้ว
3.	Thalung Lek	ถลุงเหล็ก
4.	Lum Khao	หลุมข้าว
5.	Huai Pong	ห้วยโป่ง
6.	Khlong Ket	คลองเกตุ
7.	Sakae Rap	สะแกราบ
8.	Phaniat	เพนียด
9.	Wang Phloeng	วังเพลิง
10.	Dong Marum	ดงมะรุม
18.	Wang Khon Khwang	วังขอนขว้าง
20.	Wang Chan	วังจั่น
22.	Nong Khaem	หนองแขม

Missing numbers are tambon which now form Nong Muang and Khok Charoen Districts.
