= Wichian Buri district =

Wichian Buri วิเชียรบุรี
- District
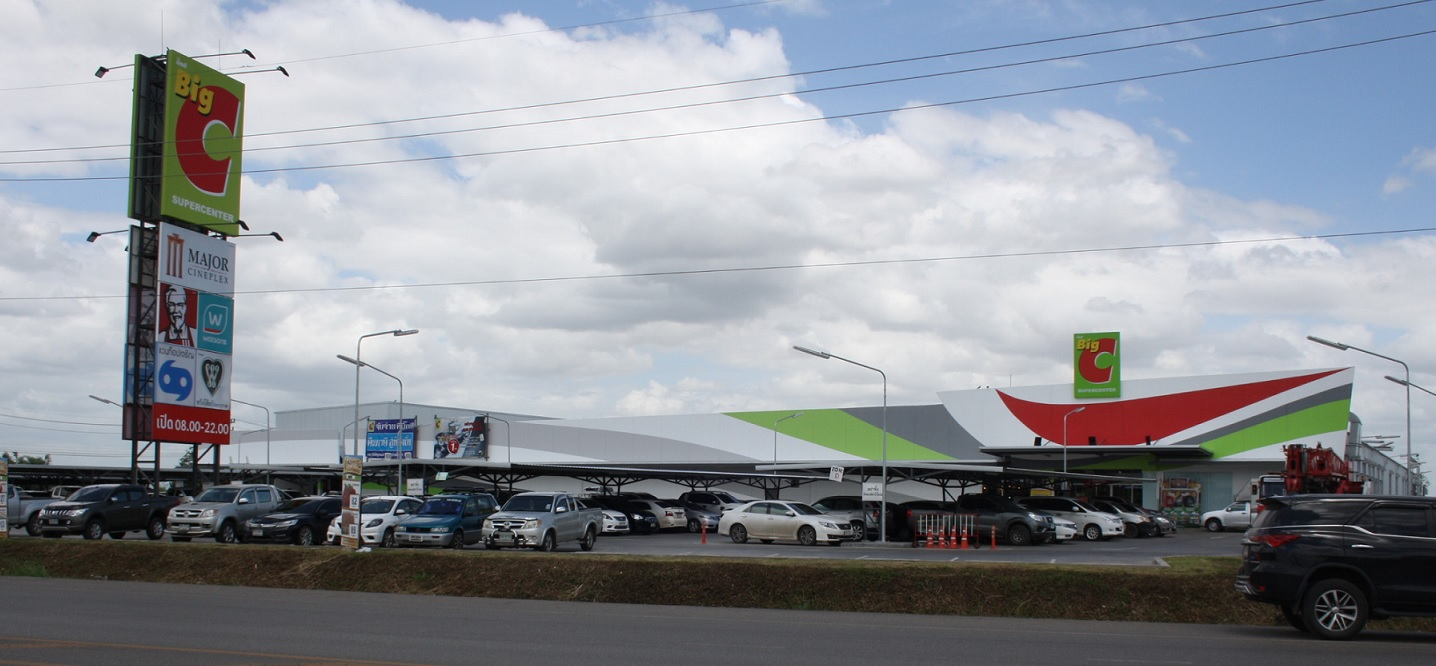
- Big C Wichian Buri

- District location in Phetchabun province
- Coordinates: 15°39′26″N 101°6′24″E
- Country: Thailand
- Province: Phetchabun
- Seat: Tha Rong

Area
  - Total: 1,632.0 km^{2} (630.1 sq mi)

Population (2015)
  - Total: 132,490
  - Density: 79.2/km^{2} (205/sq mi)
- Time zone: UTC+7 (ICT)
- Postal code: 67130
- Geocode: 6705

Wichian Buri (Thai: วิเชียรบุรี, pronounced [wí.t͡ɕʰīa̯n bū.rīː]) is a district (amphoe) in southern part of Phetchabun province, northern Thailand.

== History and toponymy ==
In the past the area of Wichian Buri was administered by Mueang Tha Rong. King Rama III upgraded the status of Tha Rong city by amalgamating Bua Chum and Chai Badan and changed the city name to be Wichian Buri. When King Rama V created Monthon Phetchabun, Wichian Buri became a subordinate of Phetchabun in 1898. The name of the district was changed to Tha Rong on 17 April 1939, but changed back to Wichian Buri in 1944.

The name Wichian Buri literally translates to "crystal city" or "crystal town", the first element Wichian in Thai means "crystal" or "diamond", the second element Buri from Sanskrit purī (पुरी); meaning "town" or "city". Its name is based on the name of a local mountain, Khao Thamorat. Thamo (ថ្ម) is Khmer; meaning "mountain" or "stone", and rat is an abbreviation of rattana (รัตนะ, pronounced [ráttāná]); meaning "crystal", hence named it accordingly.

Khao Thamorat is actually located in the neighboring, Si Thep. It is part of Si Thep Historical Park.

== Geography ==
Neighboring districts are (from the north clockwise) Bueng Sam Phan of Phetchabun Province, Phakdi Chumphon and Thep Sathit of Chaiyaphum province, Si Thep of Phetchabun, and Phaisali of Nakhon Sawan province.

== Climate ==
Climate data for Wichian Buri (1991–2020, extremes 1970-present)
| Month | Jan | Feb | Mar | Apr | May | Jun | Jul | Aug | Sep | Oct | Nov | Dec | Year |
|---|---|---|---|---|---|---|---|---|---|---|---|---|---|
| Record high °C (°F) | 37.5 (99.5) | 39.6 (103.3) | 41.0 (105.8) | 42.1 (107.8) | 41.5 (106.7) | 39.0 (102.2) | 38.2 (100.8) | 38.0 (100.4) | 39.1 (102.4) | 36.5 (97.7) | 37.4 (99.3) | 36.4 (97.5) | 42.1 (107.8) |
| Mean daily maximum °C (°F) | 32.6 (90.7) | 34.8 (94.6) | 36.7 (98.1) | 37.4 (99.3) | 35.8 (96.4) | 34.7 (94.5) | 33.7 (92.7) | 33.1 (91.6) | 32.7 (90.9) | 32.8 (91.0) | 32.7 (90.9) | 31.8 (89.2) | 34.1 (93.3) |
| Daily mean °C (°F) | 25.3 (77.5) | 27.5 (81.5) | 29.6 (85.3) | 30.5 (86.9) | 29.7 (85.5) | 29.3 (84.7) | 28.7 (83.7) | 28.2 (82.8) | 28.0 (82.4) | 27.8 (82.0) | 26.7 (80.1) | 25.1 (77.2) | 28.0 (82.5) |
| Mean daily minimum °C (°F) | 18.9 (66.0) | 20.9 (69.6) | 23.6 (74.5) | 25.2 (77.4) | 25.5 (77.9) | 25.3 (77.5) | 25.0 (77.0) | 24.7 (76.5) | 24.7 (76.5) | 24.0 (75.2) | 21.6 (70.9) | 19.1 (66.4) | 23.2 (73.8) |
| Record low °C (°F) | 7.5 (45.5) | 10.1 (50.2) | 11.2 (52.2) | 19.3 (66.7) | 20.0 (68.0) | 21.6 (70.9) | 20.5 (68.9) | 21.7 (71.1) | 21.5 (70.7) | 15.2 (59.4) | 9.3 (48.7) | 5.5 (41.9) | 5.5 (41.9) |
| Average precipitation mm (inches) | 13.4 (0.53) | 12.8 (0.50) | 47.0 (1.85) | 94.2 (3.71) | 143.5 (5.65) | 151.7 (5.97) | 171.3 (6.74) | 221.5 (8.72) | 255.8 (10.07) | 114.4 (4.50) | 23.9 (0.94) | 7.7 (0.30) | 1,257.2 (49.50) |
| Average precipitation days (≥ 1.0 mm) | 0.8 | 1.2 | 3.4 | 6.5 | 11.0 | 10.8 | 12.3 | 14.0 | 15.3 | 8.3 | 2.0 | 0.5 | 86.1 |
| Average relative humidity (%) | 65.1 | 61.3 | 62.1 | 65.9 | 73.8 | 76.0 | 78.2 | 80.5 | 82.2 | 77.6 | 71.0 | 65.8 | 71.6 |
| Mean monthly sunshine hours | 260.4 | 245.8 | 238.7 | 204.0 | 158.1 | 117.0 | 120.9 | 58.9 | 108.0 | 179.8 | 219.0 | 260.4 | 2,171 |
| Mean daily sunshine hours | 8.4 | 8.7 | 7.7 | 6.8 | 5.1 | 3.9 | 3.9 | 1.9 | 3.6 | 5.8 | 7.3 | 8.4 | 6.0 |
Source 1: World Meteorological Organization
Source 2: Office of Water Management and Hydrology, Royal Irrigation Department (sun 1981–2010)(extremes)

== Administration ==
=== Central administration ===
Wichian Buri is divided into 14 sub-districts (tambons), which are further subdivided into 192 administrative villages (mubans).

| No. | Name | Thai | Villages | Pop. |
|---|---|---|---|---|
| 1. | Tha Rong | ท่าโรง | 18 | 26,106 |
| 2. | Sa Pradu | สระประดู่ | 12 | 6,614 |
| 3. | Sam Yaek | สามแยก | 10 | 5,399 |
| 4. | Khok Prong | โคกปรง | 17 | 9,956 |
| 5. | Nam Ron | น้ำร้อน | 12 | 8,559 |
| 6. | Bo Rang | บ่อรัง | 22 | 15,282 |
| 7. | Phu Toei | พุเตย | 14 | 12,189 |
| 8. | Phu Kham | พุขาม | 10 | 8,386 |
| 9. | Phu Nam Yot | ภูน้ำหยด | 16 | 7,355 |
| 10. | Sap Sombun | ซับสมบูรณ์ | 10 | 5,021 |
| 11. | Bueng Krachap | บึงกระจับ | 10 | 6,411 |
| 12. | Wang Yai | วังใหญ่ | 10 | 5,586 |
| 13. | Yang Sao | ยางสาว | 17 | 9,338 |
| 14. | Sap Noi | ซับน้อย | 14 | 6,288 |

=== Local administration ===
There is one town (thesaban mueang) in the district:

- Wichian Buri (Thai: เทศบาลเมืองวิเชียรบุรี) consisting of parts of sub-districts Tha Rong and Sa Pradu.

There is one sub-district municipality (thesaban tambon) in the district:

- Phu Toei (Thai: เทศบาลตำบลพุเตย) consisting of parts of sub-district Phu Toei.

There are 14 sub-district administrative organizations (SAO) in the district:

- Tha Rong (Thai: องค์การบริหารส่วนตำบลท่าโรง) consisting of parts of sub-district Tha Rong.
- Sa Pradu (Thai: องค์การบริหารส่วนตำบลสระประดู่) consisting of parts of sub-district Sa Pradu.
- Sam Yaek (Thai: องค์การบริหารส่วนตำบลสามแยก) consisting of sub-district Sam Yaek.
- Khok Prong (Thai: องค์การบริหารส่วนตำบลโคกปรง) consisting of sub-district Khok Prong.
- Nam Ron (Thai: องค์การบริหารส่วนตำบลน้ำร้อน) consisting of sub-district Nam Ron.
- Bo Rang (Thai: องค์การบริหารส่วนตำบลบ่อรัง) consisting of sub-district Bo Rang.
- Phu Toei (Thai: องค์การบริหารส่วนตำบลพุเตย) consisting of parts of sub-district Phu Toei.
- Phu Kham (Thai: องค์การบริหารส่วนตำบลพุขาม) consisting of sub-district Phu Kham.
- Phu Nam Yot (Thai: องค์การบริหารส่วนตำบลภูน้ำหยด) consisting of sub-district Phu Nam Yot.
- Sap Sombun (Thai: องค์การบริหารส่วนตำบลซับสมบูรณ์) consisting of sub-district Sap Sombun.
- Bueng Krachap (Thai: องค์การบริหารส่วนตำบลบึงกระจับ) consisting of sub-district Bueng Krachap.
- Wang Yai (Thai: องค์การบริหารส่วนตำบลวังใหญ่) consisting of sub-district Wang Yai.
- Yang Sao (Thai: องค์การบริหารส่วนตำบลยางสาว) consisting of sub-district Yang Sao.
- Sap Noi (Thai: องค์การบริหารส่วนตำบลซับน้อย) consisting of sub-district Sap Noi.

== Wichian Buri grilled chicken ==
Wichian Buri grilled chicken is a chicken dish from the Wichian Buri District. It is unique because it is made with Phetchabun regional ingredients, like a tamarind sauce and pickled garlic. The salty roasted chicken is sold at restaurants and street food stalls and often served with papaya salad and rice.

There are two types of chicken used for grilling; backyard chickens (kai ban; ไก่บ้าน) and broilers (kai nuea; ไก่เนื้อ). The chicken is marinated overnight in the refrigerator or over ice in a plastic bag with garlic, fish sauce, salt, pepper, coriander sauces. Then, it is cooked. The grilled chicken sauce is sweet, sour, and salty. The main and secret ingredients for this sauce are sugar, tamarind, garlic, chili powder, and salt.

Thai Airways International named one of its airplanes Wichian Buri for the district's grilled chicken prowess.

== See also ==
- Kai yang
- Street food of Thailand
