= Chai Badan district =

Chai Badan ชัยบาดาล
- District
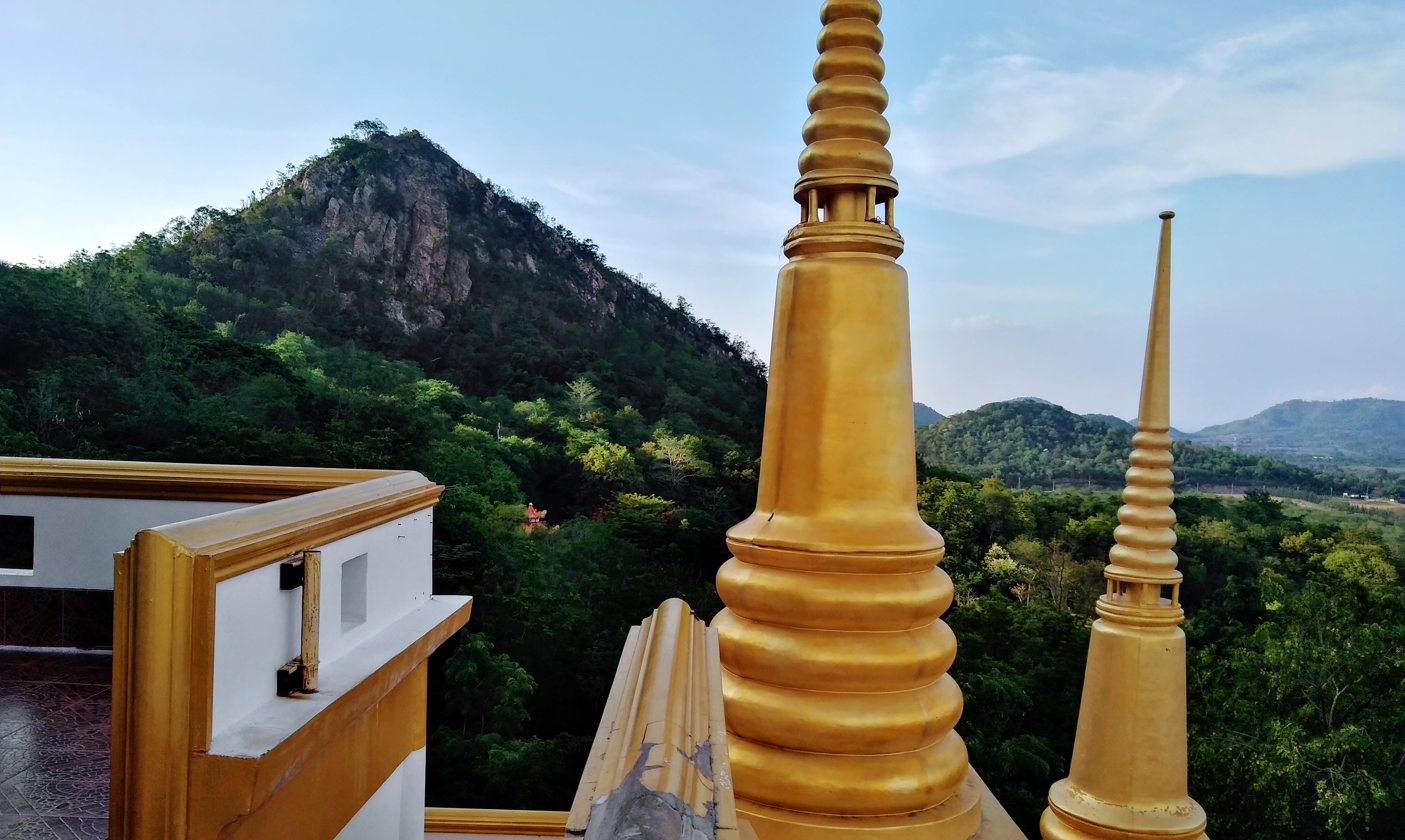
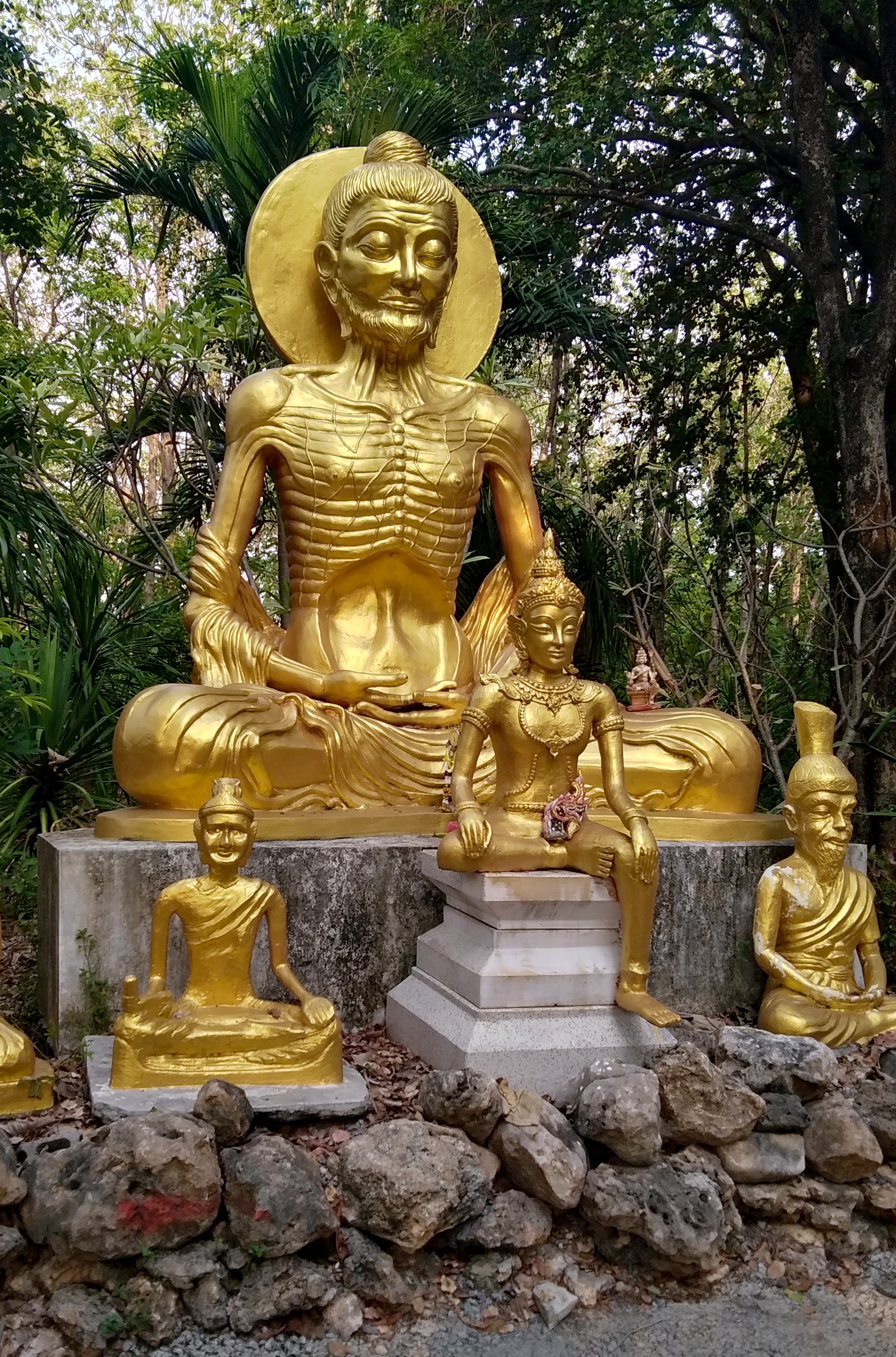
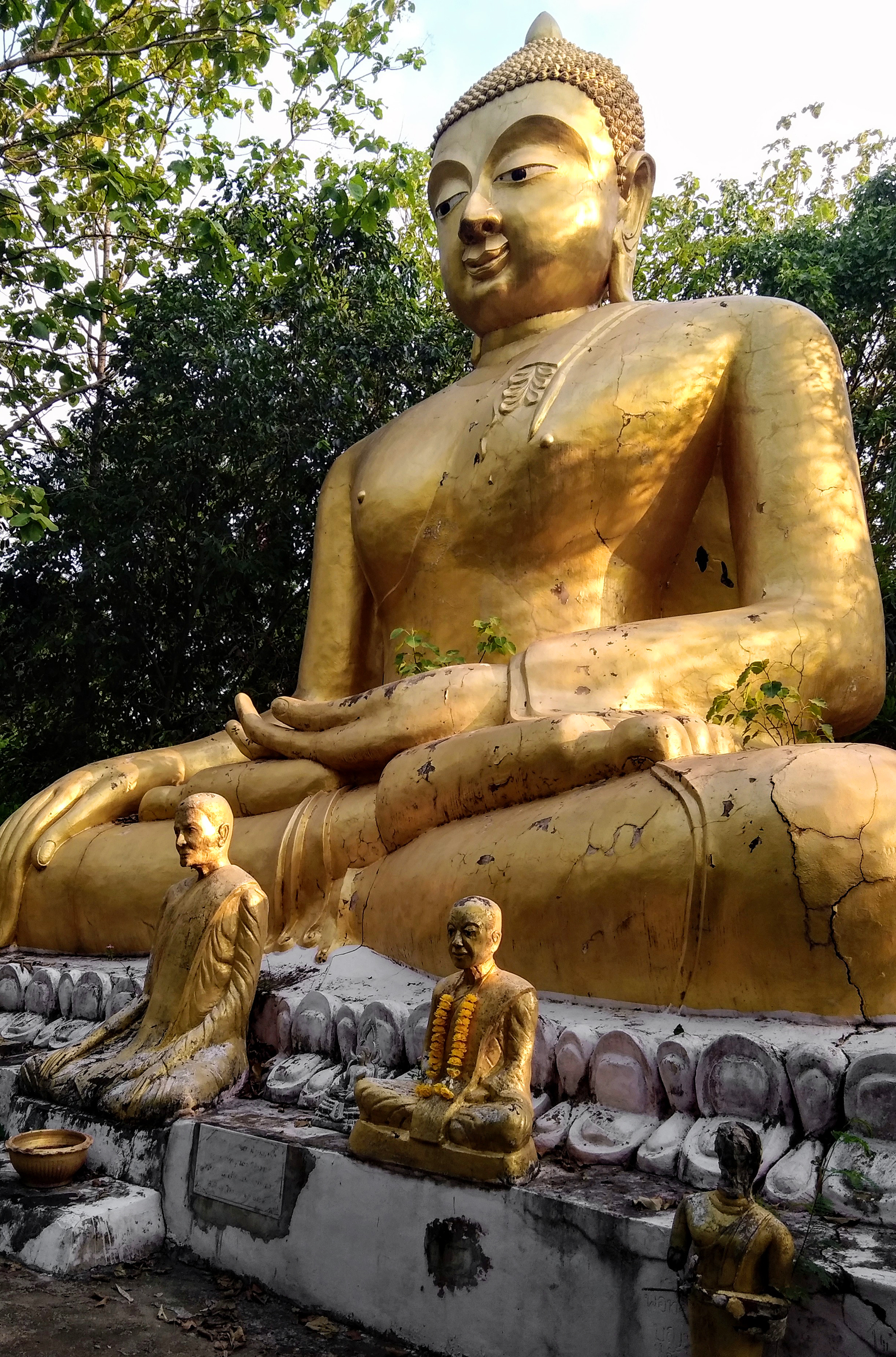
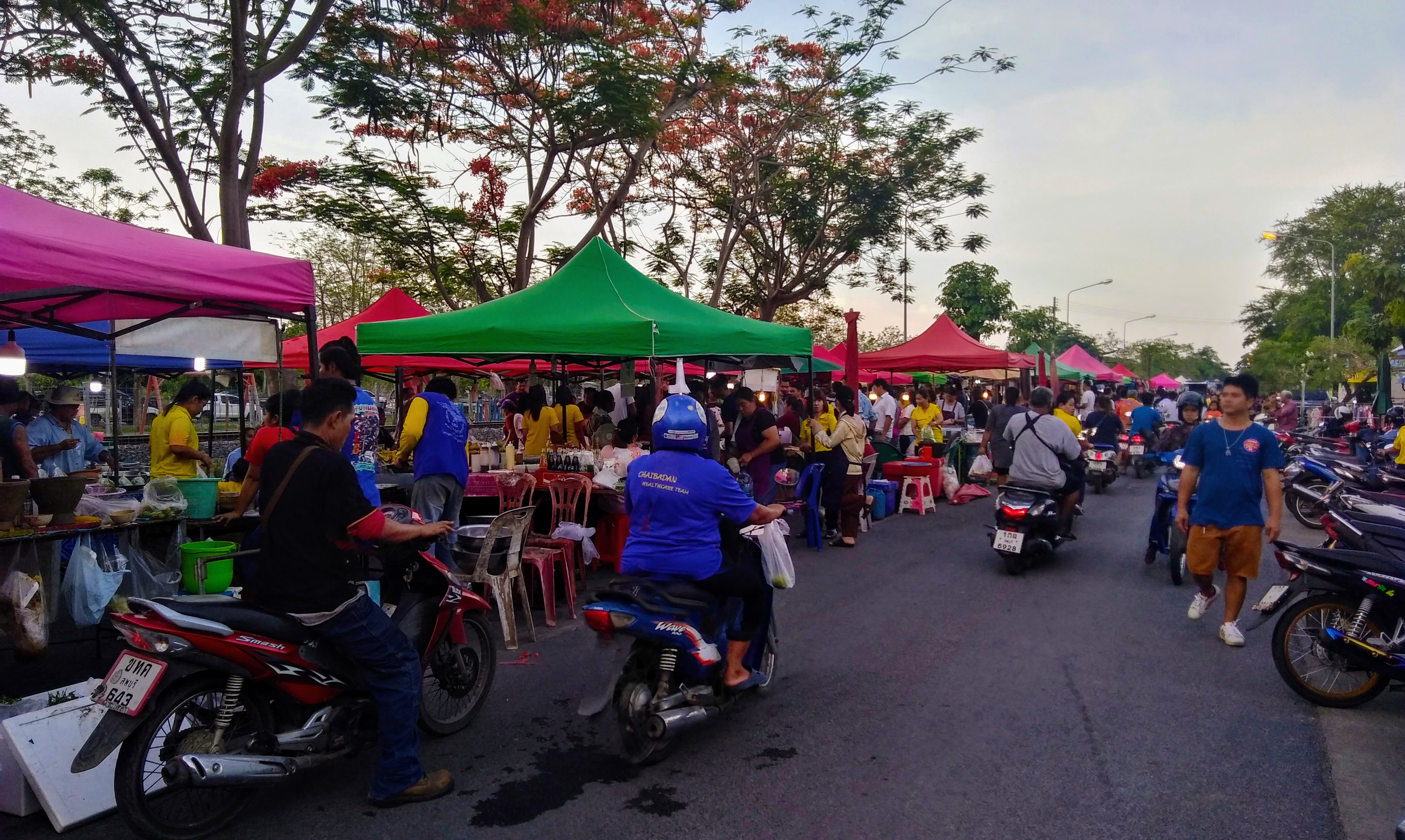
- From top to bottom: View from Wat Tham Phrathat Khao Prang; religious statues at Wat Wang Kan Lueang; market by the train tracks

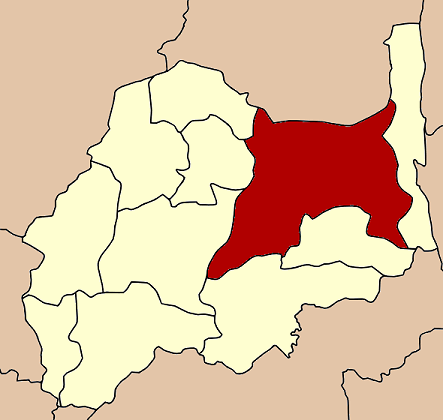
- District location in Lopburi province
- Coordinates: 15°12′22″N 101°8′12″E
- Country: Thailand
- Province: Lopburi
- Seat: Lam Narai

Area
  - Total: 1,253.0 km^{2} (483.8 sq mi)

Population (2009)
  - Total: 90,224
  - Density: 70.7/km^{2} (183/sq mi)
- Time zone: UTC+7 (ICT)
- Postal code: 15130
- Geocode: 1604

Chai Badan (Thai: ชัยบาดาล, pronounced [t͡ɕʰāj bāː.dāːn]) is a district (amphoe) in the eastern part of Lopburi province, central Thailand. The local people usually call it Lam Narai, as the district center is in Tambon Lam Narai.

== History ==
Chai Badan was an ancient town in the Pa Sak River valley, controlled from Nakhon Ratchasima. In 1914 it was upgraded to be a district of Phetchabun province. In 1918 it was moved to be part of Saraburi province. Finally it became part of Lopburi province on 1 November 1941.

In 1943 the district office was moved from Chai Badan Sub-district to Bua Chum Sub-district, which was undone one year later. In 1960 it was again moved to Bua Chum. The area around the district office was made the new Sub-district Lam Narai in 1970.

== Geography ==
Neighbouring districts are (from the east clockwise) Lam Sonthi, Tha Luang, Phatthana Nikhom, Khok Samrong and Khok Charoen of Lopburi Province, and Si Thep of Phetchabun province.

The Wang Kan Luang waterfall is the most visited place by Lopburi visitors.

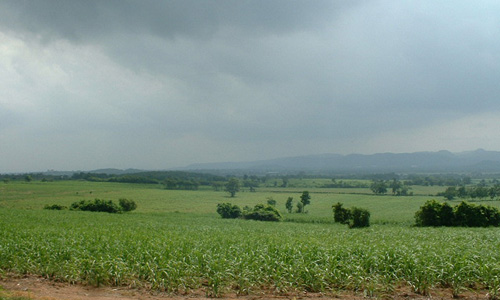
Rainy season, Chai Badan

The district is the site of a Royal Thai Air Force gunnery range.

== Administration ==
The district is divided into 17 sub-districts (tambons), which are further subdivided into 136 villages (mubans). Lam Narai has sub-district municipality status (thesaban tambon) and covers part of the tambon Lam Narai and Chai Narai. There are a further 16 tambon administrative organizations (TAO).

No.	Name	Thai	Villages	Pop.
1.	Lam Narai	ลำนารายณ์	12	17,488
2.	Chai Narai	ชัยนารายณ์	6	6,294
3.	Sila Thip	ศิลาทิพย์	12	5,635
4.	Huai Hin	ห้วยหิน	8	2,741
5.	Muang Khom	ม่วงค่อม	11	5,650
6.	Bua Chum	บัวชุม	9	8,071
7.	Tha Din Dam	ท่าดินดำ	6	4,509
8.	Makok Wan	มะกอกหวาน	3	1,504
9.	Sap Takhian	ซับตะเคียน	6	4,896
10.	Na Som	นาโสม	6	2,655
11.	Nong Yai To	หนองยายโต๊ะ	8	4,000
12.	Ko Rang	เกาะรัง	10	6,510
14.	Tha Manao	ท่ามะนาว	8	3,224
17.	Nikhom Lam Narai	นิคมลำนารายณ์	9	4,423
18.	Chai Badan	ชัยบาดาล	8	6,334
19.	Ban Mai Samakkhi	บ้านใหม่สามัคคี	6	2,957
22.	Khao Laem	เขาแหลม	8	3,333

The missing numbers belong to tambon which now form Lam Sonthi District

== Climate ==
Climate data for Chai Badan (Bua Chum) (1991–2020)
Month	Jan	Feb	Mar	Apr	May	Jun	Jul	Aug	Sep	Oct	Nov	Dec	Year
Record high °C (°F)	38.0 (100.4)	40.7 (105.3)	42.4 (108.3)	42.7 (108.9)	41.8 (107.2)	40.9 (105.6)	39.1 (102.4)	37.5 (99.5)	36.3 (97.3)	35.8 (96.4)	37.4 (99.3)	36.5 (97.7)	42.7 (108.9)
Mean daily maximum °C (°F)	32.5 (90.5)	35.0 (95.0)	36.9 (98.4)	37.6 (99.7)	36.1 (97.0)	35.0 (95.0)	34.1 (93.4)	33.5 (92.3)	32.9 (91.2)	32.6 (90.7)	32.3 (90.1)	31.5 (88.7)	34.2 (93.5)
Daily mean °C (°F)	25.0 (77.0)	27.4 (81.3)	29.6 (85.3)	30.4 (86.7)	29.6 (85.3)	29.2 (84.6)	28.6 (83.5)	28.1 (82.6)	27.7 (81.9)	27.4 (81.3)	26.1 (79.0)	24.6 (76.3)	27.8 (82.1)
Mean daily minimum °C (°F)	18.6 (65.5)	20.7 (69.3)	23.3 (73.9)	24.8 (76.6)	25.0 (77.0)	24.8 (76.6)	24.4 (75.9)	24.2 (75.6)	24.1 (75.4)	23.3 (73.9)	20.9 (69.6)	18.6 (65.5)	22.7 (72.9)
Record low °C (°F)	8.4 (47.1)	11.6 (52.9)	12.7 (54.9)	19.5 (67.1)	20.9 (69.6)	21.6 (70.9)	21.0 (69.8)	21.4 (70.5)	20.7 (69.3)	14.1 (57.4)	9.7 (49.5)	5.7 (42.3)	5.7 (42.3)
Average precipitation mm (inches)	11.3 (0.44)	8.6 (0.34)	41.7 (1.64)	78.4 (3.09)	136.1 (5.36)	124.0 (4.88)	121.2 (4.77)	184.4 (7.26)	246.0 (9.69)	131.7 (5.19)	15.6 (0.61)	6.0 (0.24)	1,105 (43.50)
Average precipitation days (≥ 1.0 mm)	0.8	1.2	3.4	6.1	10.7	9.0	10.6	13.1	14.3	8.6	1.6	0.6	80.0
Average relative humidity (%)	65.9	62.9	64.2	68.1	76.0	77.3	79.0	82.0	84.8	81.1	73.7	67.7	73.6
Source: World Meteorological Organization(extremes)
