= Lam Chi railway station =

Railway station in Thailand

Lam Chi ลำชี
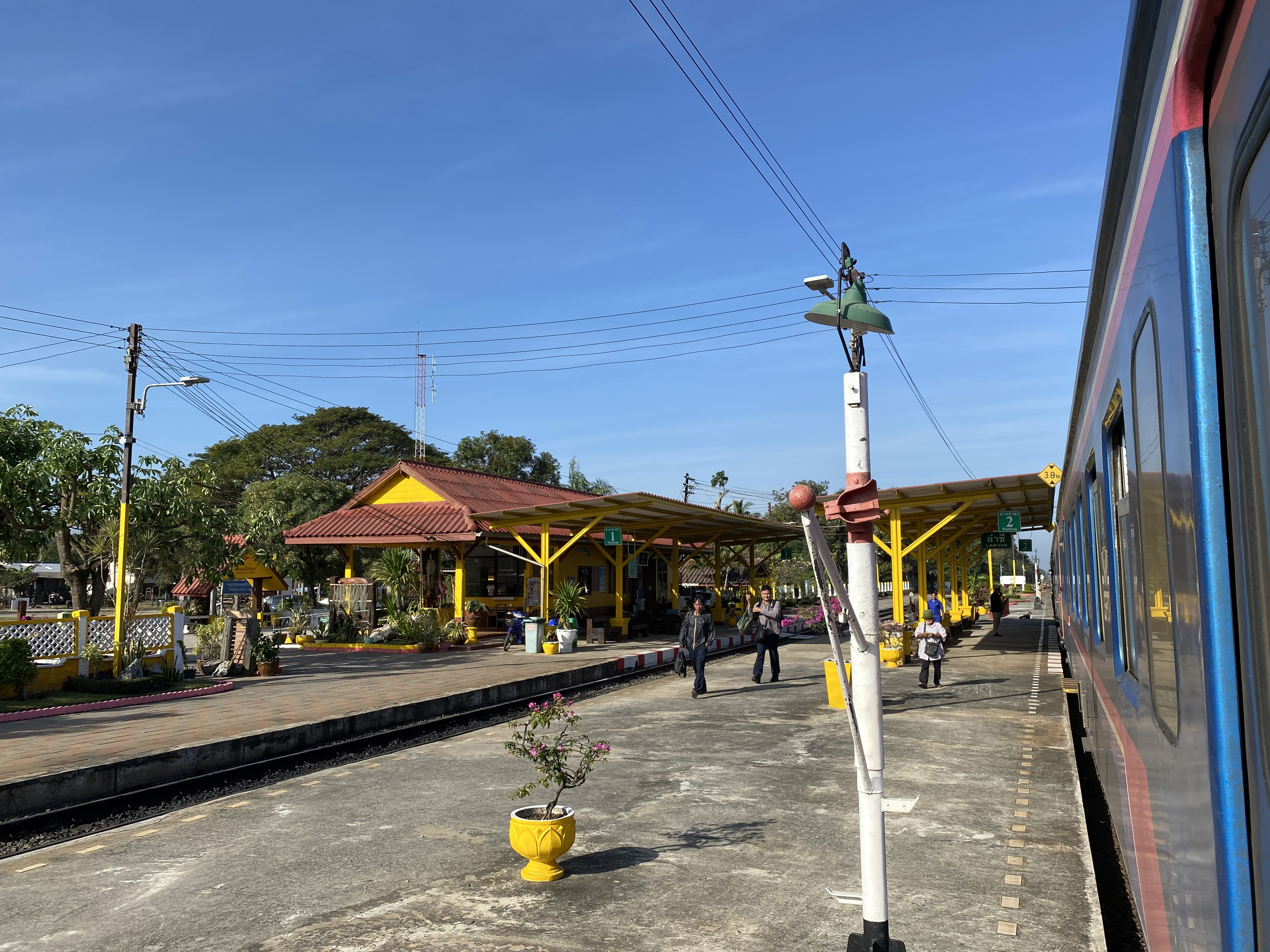

General information
- Location: Kho Kho Subdistrict, Mueang Surin District, Surin Province
- Coordinates: 14°53′59″N 103°25′22″E
- Owner: State Railway of Thailand
- Line: Northeastern Line
- Platforms: 2
- Tracks: 4

Other information
- Station code: ลช.

Services
Preceding station	State Railway of Thailand	Following station
Nong Teng towards Hua Lamphong or Krung Thep Aphiwat	Northeastern Line	Surin towards Ubon Ratchathani
Location

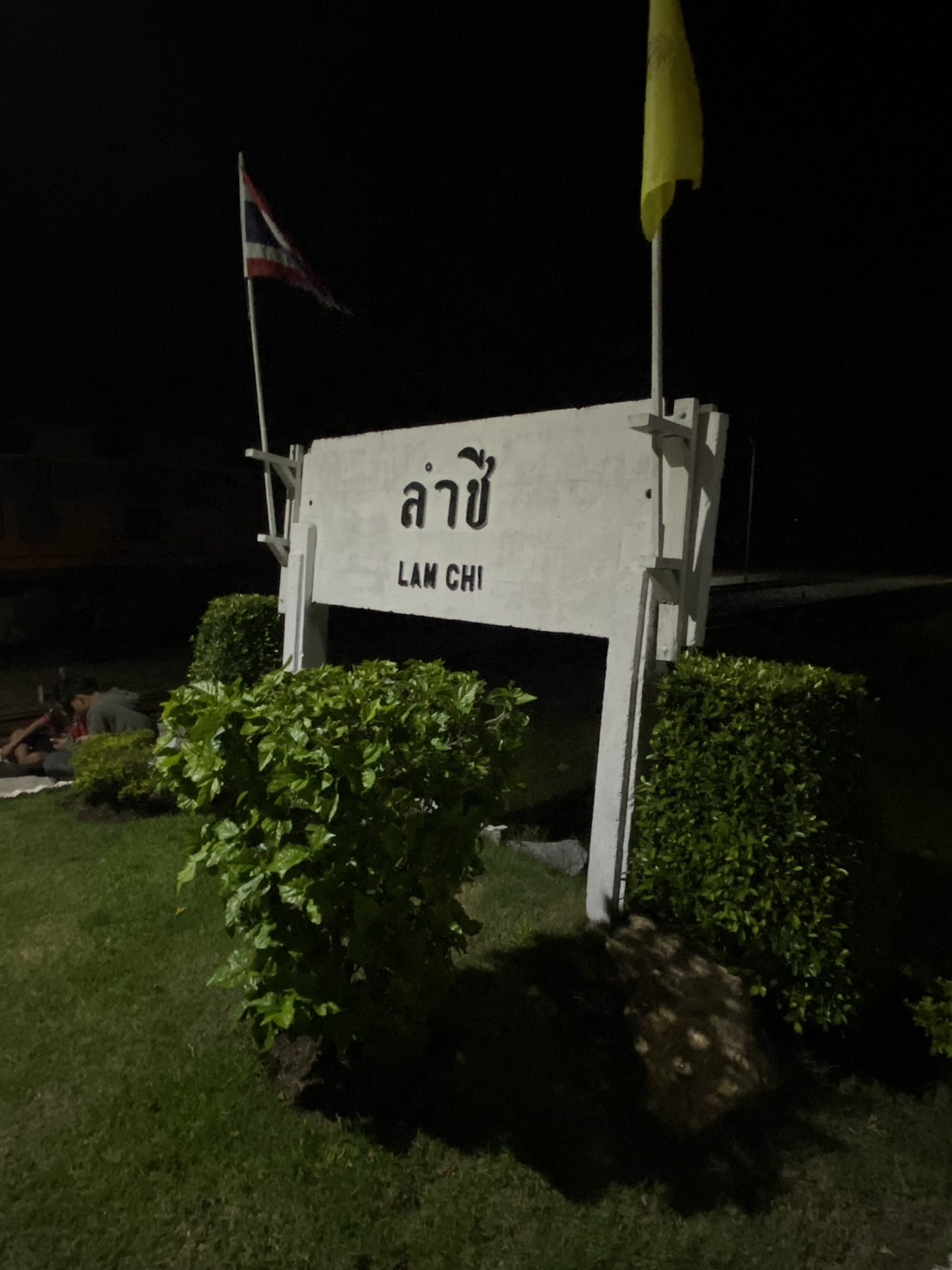
Station sign at night

Lam Chi railway station is a railway station located in Kho Kho Subdistrict, Mueang Surin District, Surin Province. It is a class 3 railway station located 412.00 km (256.0 mi) from Bangkok railway station. It is the location of a TPI Polene cement rail distribution center.
