= Bu Rusi railway station =

Railway station in Thailand

Bu Rusi บุฤาษี

General information
- Location: Bu Rusi Subdistrict, Mueang Surin District, Surin Province
- Coordinates: 14°53′24″N 103°34′35″E
- Owner: State Railway of Thailand
- Line: Northeastern Line
- Platforms: 1
- Tracks: 3

Other information
- Station code: บุ.

Services
Preceding station	State Railway of Thailand	Following station
Surin towards Hua Lamphong or Krung Thep Aphiwat	Northeastern Line	Mueang Thi towards Ubon Ratchathani
Location

Bu Rusi station (Thai: สถานีบุฤๅษี) is a railway station located in Bu Rusi Subdistrict, Mueang Surin District, Surin Province. It is a class 3 railway station located 428.60 km (266.3 mi) from Bangkok railway station.
