= Ban Kalan railway station =

Railway station in Na Rung, Thailand

Ban Kalan บ้านกะลัน

General information
- Location: Na Rung Subdistrict, Sikhoraphum District, Surin Province
- Coordinates: 14°58′25″N 103°51′12″E
- Owner: State Railway of Thailand
- Line: Northeastern Line
- Platforms: 1
- Tracks: 2

Other information
- Station code: ลน.

Services
Preceding station	State Railway of Thailand	Following station
Sikhoraphum towards Hua Lamphong or Krung Thep Aphiwat	Northeastern Line	Samrong Thap towards Ubon Ratchathani
Location

Ban Kalan station (Thai: สถานีบ้านกะลัน) is a railway station located in Na Rung Subdistrict, Sikhoraphum District, Surin Province. It is a class 3 railway station located 460.25 km (286.0 mi) from Bangkok railway station.
