= Sikhoraphum railway station =

Railway station in Thailand

Sikhoraphum ศีขรภูมิ

General information
- Location: Ra-ngaeng Subdistrict, Sikhoraphum District, Surin Province
- Coordinates: 14°56′43″N 103°47′11″E
- Owner: State Railway of Thailand
- Line: Northeastern Line
- Platforms: 2
- Tracks: 3

Other information
- Station code: รภ.

Services
Preceding station	State Railway of Thailand	Following station
Kadon Kho towards Hua Lamphong or Krung Thep Aphiwat	Northeastern Line	Ban Kalan towards Ubon Ratchathani
Location

Sikhoraphum railway station is a railway station located in Ra-ngaeng Subdistrict, Sikhoraphum District, Surin Province. It is a class 1 railway station located 452.39 km (281.1 mi) from Bangkok railway station.
