= Mueang Thi railway station =

Railway station in Thailand

Mueang Thi เมืองที

General information
- Location: Mueang Thi Subdistrict, Mueang Surin District, Surin Province
- Coordinates: 14°53′37″N 103°39′18″E
- Owner: State Railway of Thailand
- Line: Northeastern Line
- Platforms: 1
- Tracks: 2

Other information
- Station code: อท.

Services
Preceding station	State Railway of Thailand	Following station
Bu Rusi towards Hua Lamphong or Krung Thep Aphiwat	Northeastern Line	Kadon Kho towards Ubon Ratchathani
Location

Mueang Thi railway station is a railway station located in Mueang Thi Subdistrict, Mueang Surin District, Surin Province. It is a class 3 railway station located 437.16 km (271.6 mi) from Bangkok railway station.
