= Surin railway station =

Railway station in Nai Mueang, Thailand

Coordinates: 14.8915°N 103.4940°E

Surin สุรินทร์
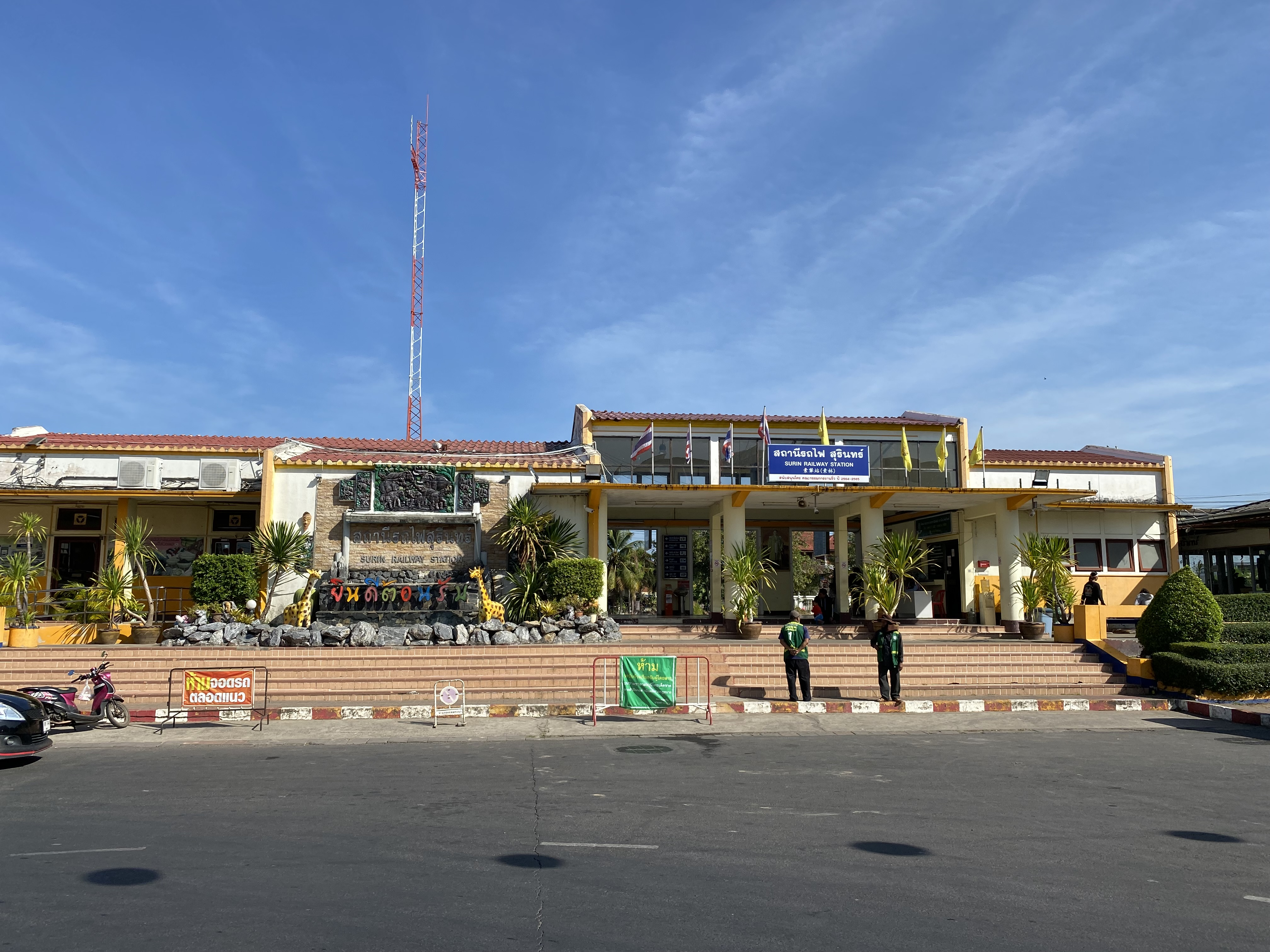
- Surin railway station in 2024

General information
- Location: Nai Mueang Subdistrict, Surin City
- Owner: State Railway of Thailand
- Line: Northeastern Line
- Platforms: 2
- Tracks: 3

Construction
- Structure type: At-grade

Other information
- Station code: สร.

History
- Opened: May 1926

Services
Preceding station	State Railway of Thailand	Following station
Lam Chi towards Hua Lamphong or Krung Thep Aphiwat	Northeastern Line	Bu Rusi towards Ubon Ratchathani
Location

Surin railway station is a railway station located in Nai Mueang Subdisrict, Surin City, Surin. It is a class 1 railway station located 419.75 km (260.8 mi) from Bangkok railway station. The station opened in May 1926 as part of the Northeastern Line Buriram-Surin section. The line extended to Huai Thap Than in May 1927.

== Train services ==
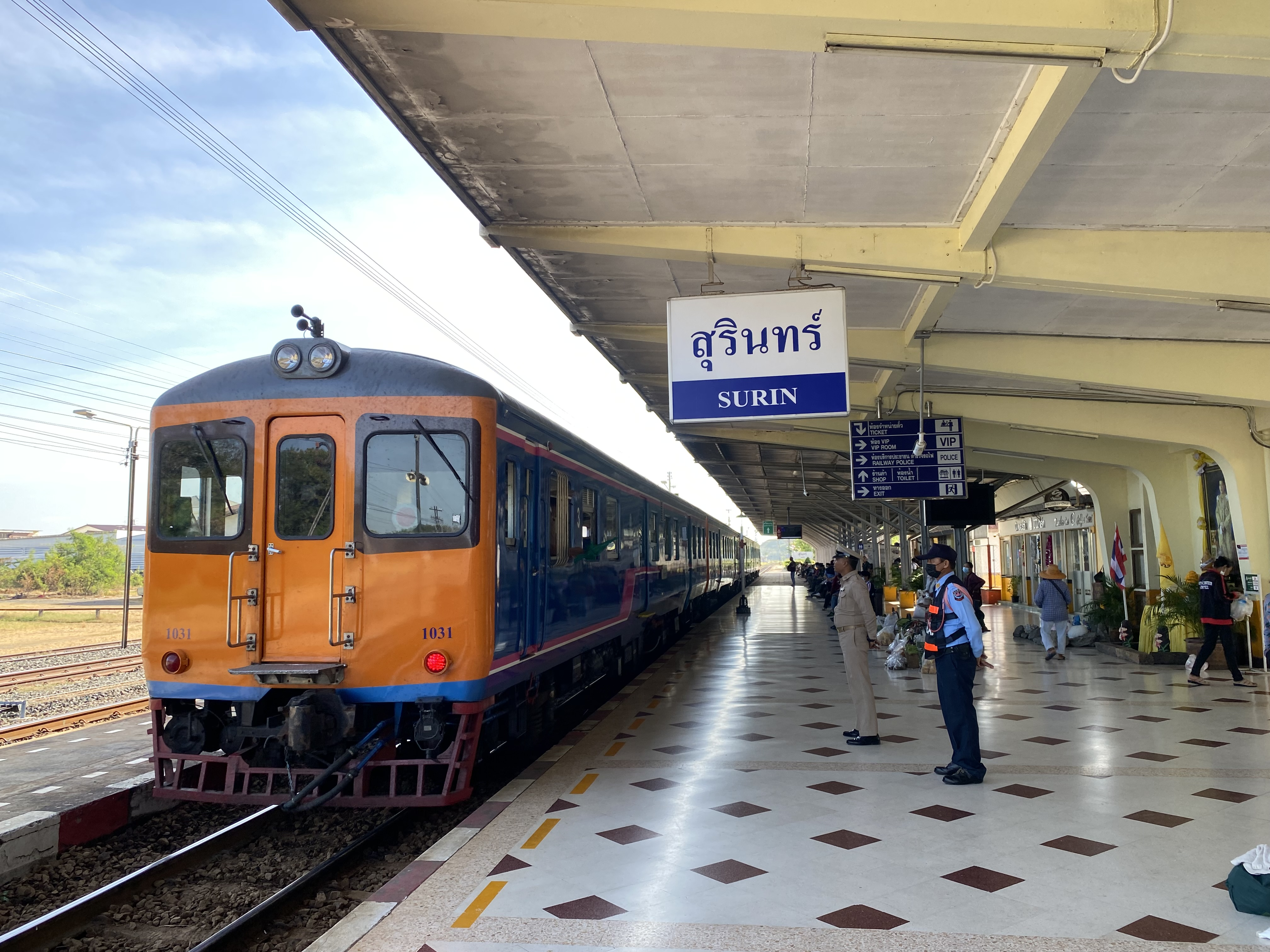
Station platform

- Special Express Diesel Car No. 21/22 Bangkok- Ubon Ratchathani - Bangkok
- Special Express "Isan Watthana" No. 23/24 Bangkok- Ubon Ratchathani - Bangkok
- Express No. 67/68 Bangkok- Ubon Ratchathani - Bangkok
- Express Diesel Car No. 71/72 Bangkok- Ubon Ratchathani - Bangkok
- Rapid No. 135/140 Bangkok - Ubon Ratchathani - Bangkok
- Rapid No. 139/146 Bangkok - Ubon Ratchathani - Bangkok
- Rapid No. 141/142 Bangkok - Ubon Ratchathani - Bangkok
- Rapid No. 145/136 Bangkok - Ubon Ratchathani - Bangkok
- Ordinary No. 233/234 Bangkok - Surin - Bangkok
- Local No. 419/420 Nakhon Ratchasima - Ubon Ratchathani - Lam Chi
- Local No. 421/422 Nakhon Ratchasima - Ubon Ratchathani - Lam Chi
- Local No. 423/424 Lam Chi - Samrong Thap - Nakhon Ratchasima
- Local No. 425/426 Lam Chi - Ubon Ratchathani - Nakhon Ratchasima
- Local No. 427/428 Nakhon Ratchasima - Ubon Ratchathani - Nakhon Ratchasima
