= Nong Teng railway station =

Railway station in Nong Teng, Thailand

Nong Teng หนองเต็ง

General information
- Location: Nong Teng Subdistrict, Krasang District, Buriram Province
- Coordinates: 14°54′32″N 103°21′47″E
- Owner: State Railway of Thailand
- Line: Northeastern Line
- Platforms: 1
- Tracks: 2

Other information
- Station code: เต.

History
- Former names: Ban Nong Teng

Services
| Preceding station | State Railway of Thailand | Following station |
|---|---|---|
| Krasang towards Hua Lamphong or Krung Thep Aphiwat | Northeastern Line | Lam Chi towards Ubon Ratchathani |
Location

Nong Teng railway station is a railway station located in Nong Teng Subdistrict, Krasang District, Buriram Province. It is a class 3 railway station located 405.50 km (252.0 mi) from Bangkok railway station.
