= Samrong Thap railway station =

Railway station in Thailand

Samrong Thap สำโรงทาบ

General information
- Location: Pradu Subdistrict, Samrong Thap District, Surin Province
- Coordinates: 15°01′16″N 103°56′26″E
- Owner: State Railway of Thailand
- Line: Northeastern Line
- Platforms: 2
- Tracks: 2

Other information
- Station code: สบ.

Services
Preceding station	State Railway of Thailand	Following station
Ban Kalan towards Hua Lamphong or Krung Thep Aphiwat	Northeastern Line	Huai Thap Than towards Ubon Ratchathani
Location

Samrong Thap railway station (Thai: สถานีรถไฟสำโรงทาบ) is a railway station located in Pradu Subdistrict, Samrong Thap District, Surin Province. It is a class 2 railway station located 471.00 km (292.7 mi) from Bangkok railway station and is the main railway station for Samrong Thap District.
