= Kadon Kho railway station =

Railway station in Thailand

Kadon Kho กะโดนค้อ

General information
- Location: Chang Pi Subdistrict, Sikhoraphum District, Surin Province
- Coordinates: 14°55′19″N 103°43′37″E
- Owner: State Railway of Thailand
- Line: Northeastern Line
- Platforms: 1
- Tracks: 2

Other information
- Station code: ดค.

Services
Preceding station	State Railway of Thailand	Following station
Mueang Thi towards Hua Lamphong or Krung Thep Aphiwat	Northeastern Line	Sikhoraphum towards Ubon Ratchathani
Location

Kadon Kho railway station is a railway station located in Chang Pi Subdistrict, Sikhoraphum District, Surin Province. It is a class 3 railway station located 445.50 km (276.8 mi) from Bangkok railway station.
