= Chatturat railway station =

Railway station in Ban Kok, Thailand

Coordinates: 15.5558°N 101.8400°E

Chatturat จัตุรัส
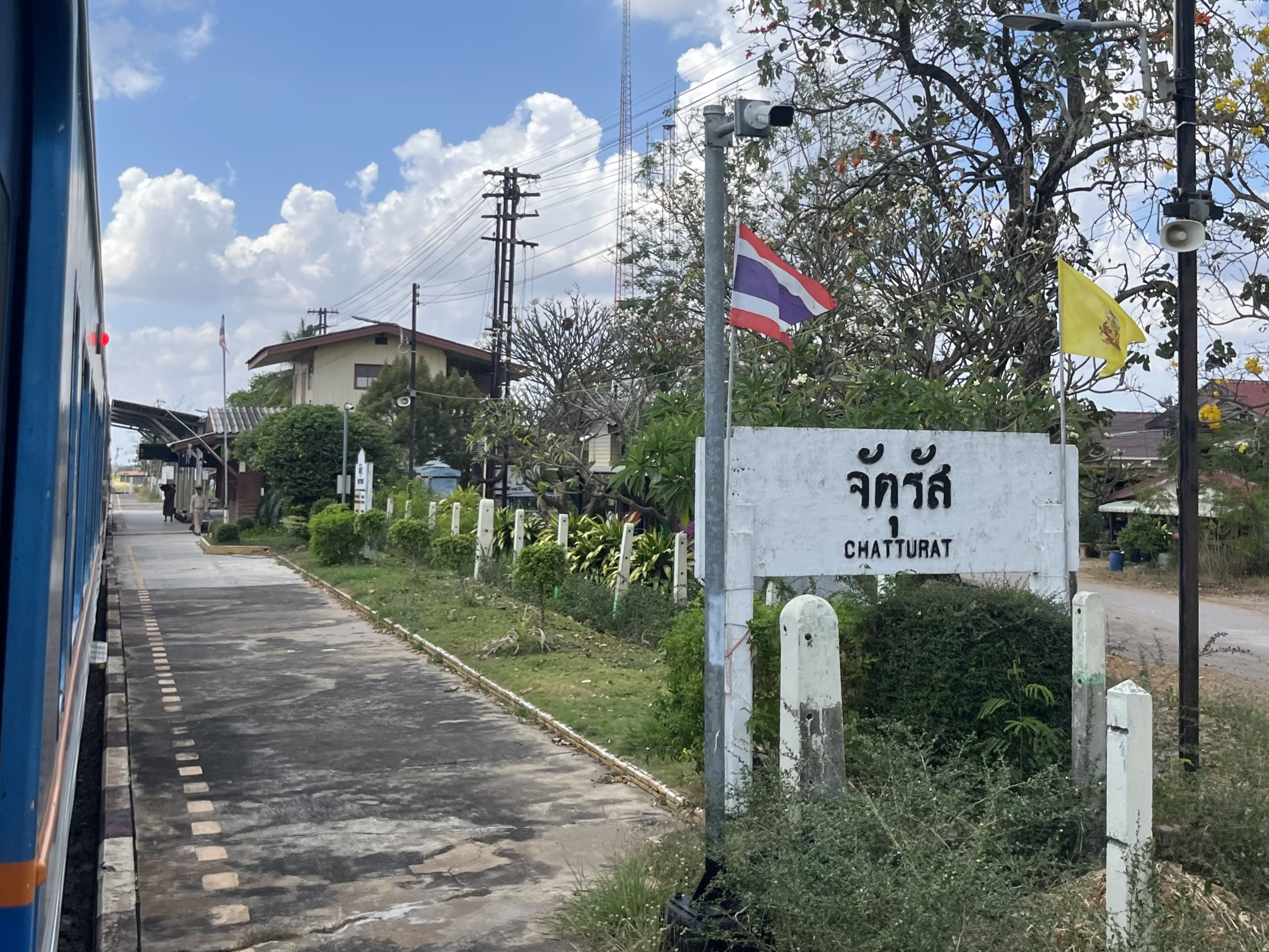
- Station in 2026

General information
- Location: Rotfai Road, Ban Kok Subdistrict, Chatturat District; Chaiyaphum Province; Thailand
- Operator: State Railway of Thailand
- Line: Lam Narai Branch
- Platforms: 1
- Tracks: 3

Construction
- Structure type: At-grade

Other information
- Station code: จต.
- Classification: Class 2

History
- Opened: 19 August 1967

Services
Preceding station	State Railway of Thailand	Following station
Non Khro Halt towards Kaeng Khoi Junction	Northeastern Line Kaeng Khoi–Bua Yai Branch	Nong Chim towards Bua Yai Junction
Location

Chatturat station (Thai: สถานีจัตุรัส) is a railway station located in Ban Kok Subdistrict, Chatturat District, Chaiyaphum. It is a class 2 railway station located 310.194 km (192.7 mi) from Bangkok railway station. The station is on the Northeastern Line, and is the main railway station for Chaiyaphum Province.

== Train services ==
- Express No. 75/76 Bangkok–Nong Khai–Bangkok
- Rapid No. 133/134 Bangkok–Nong Khai–Bangkok
- Local No. 433/434 Kaeng Khoi Junction–Bua Yai Junction–Kaeng Khoi Junction
- Local No. 439/440 Kaeng Khoi Junction–Bua Yai Junction–Kaeng Khoi Junction

== Gallery ==
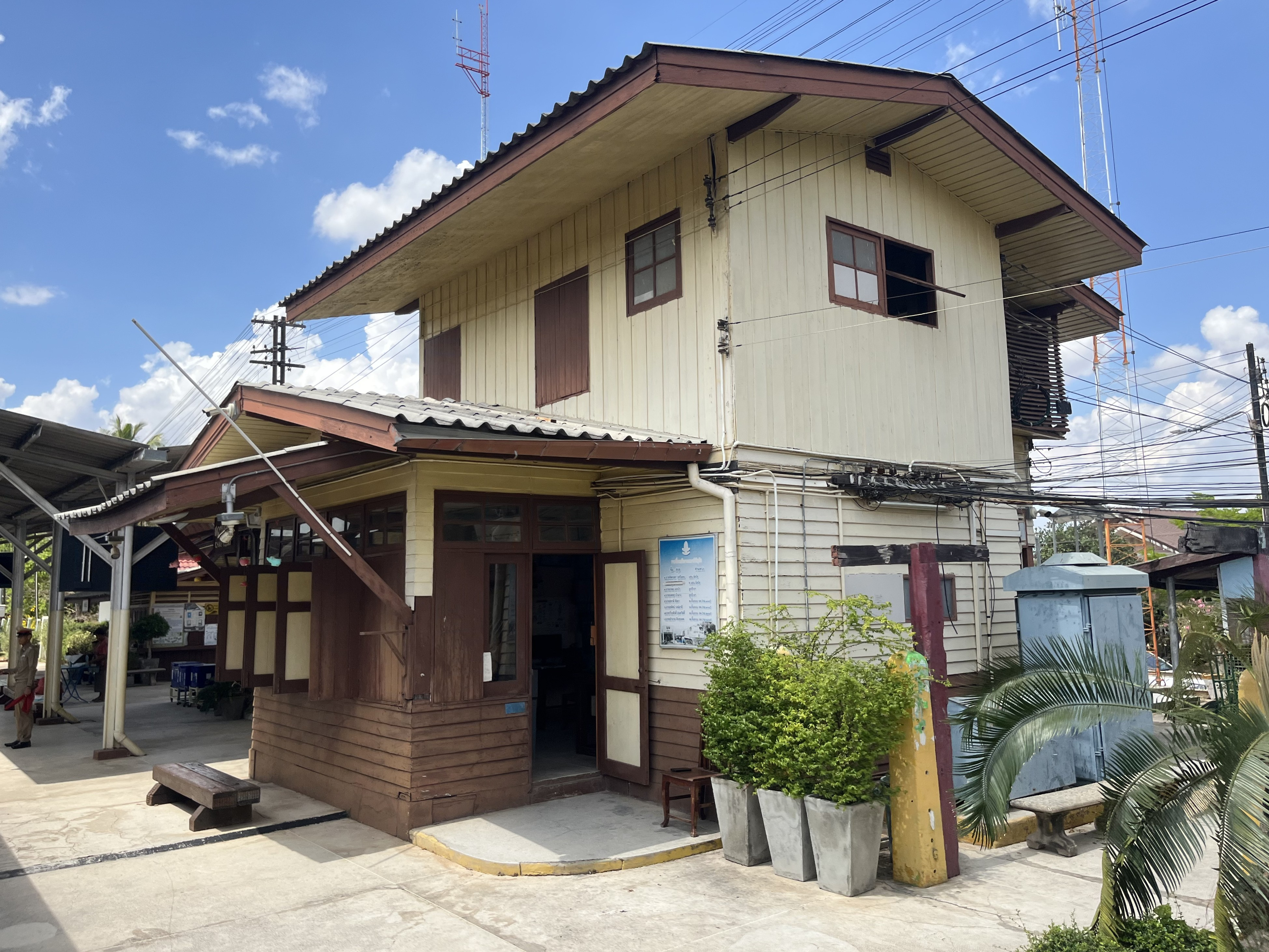
Station building
