= Nong Chim railway station =

Railway station in Thailand

Nong Chim หนองฉิม
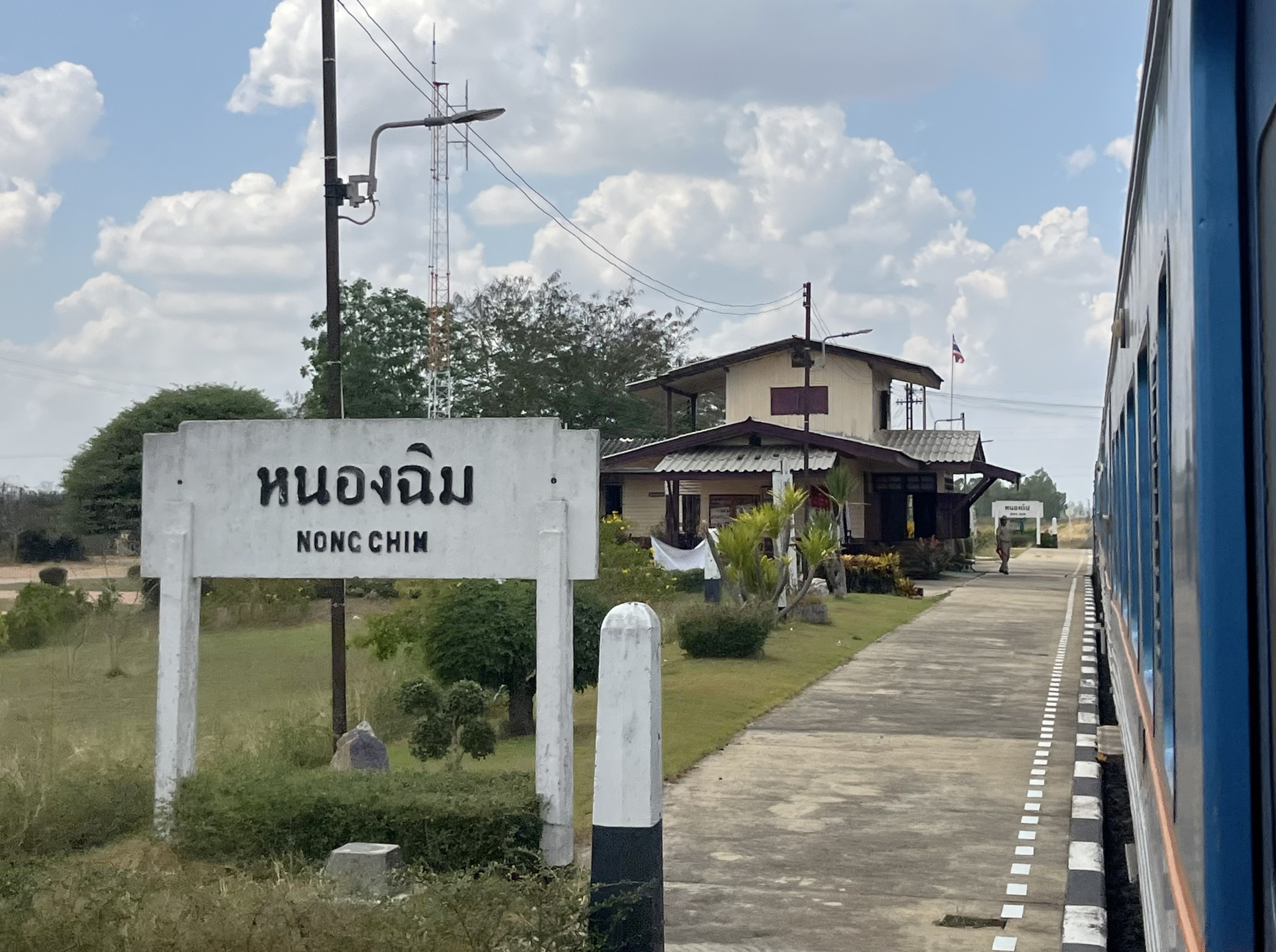
- Station in 2026

General information
- Location: Nong Chim Subdistrict, Noen Sa-nga District; Chaiyaphum Province; Thailand
- Coordinates: 15°34′18″N 101°57′10″E
- Operator: State Railway of Thailand
- Platforms: 1
- Tracks: 2

Construction
- Structure type: At-grade

Other information
- Station code: ฉม.
- Classification: Class 3

History
- Opened: 19 August 1967

Services
Preceding station	State Railway of Thailand	Following station
Chatturat towards Kaeng Khoi Junction	Northeastern Line Kaeng Khoi–Bua Yai Branch	Ban Ta Noen Halt towards Bua Yai Junction
Location

Nong Chim railway station is a railway station located in Nong Chim Subdistrict, Noen Sa-nga District, Chaiyaphum Province. It is a class 3 railway station located 322.85 km (200.6 mi) from Bangkok railway station.

== Gallery ==
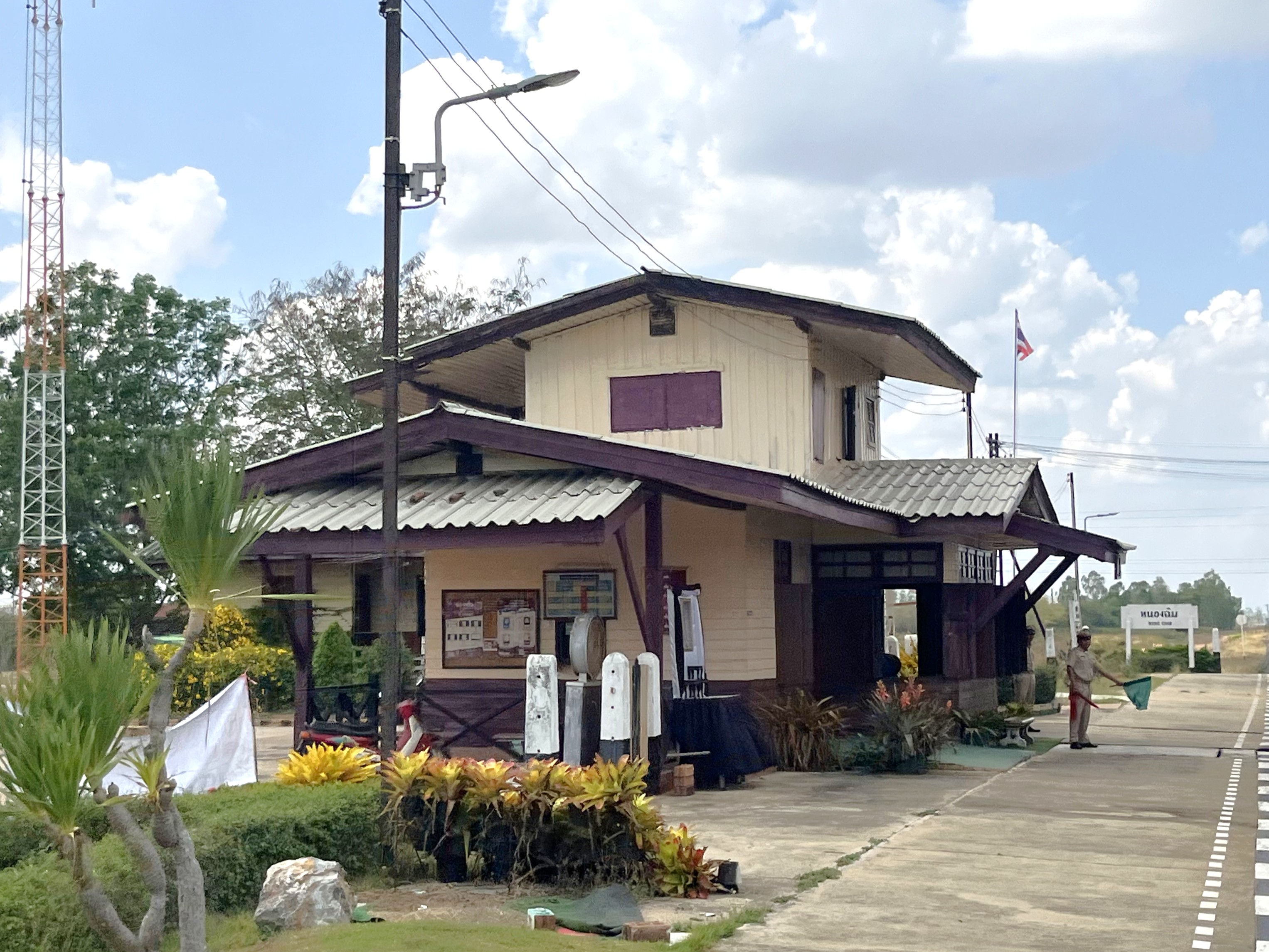
Station building
