= Tha Ruea district =

Tha Ruea ท่าเรือ
- District
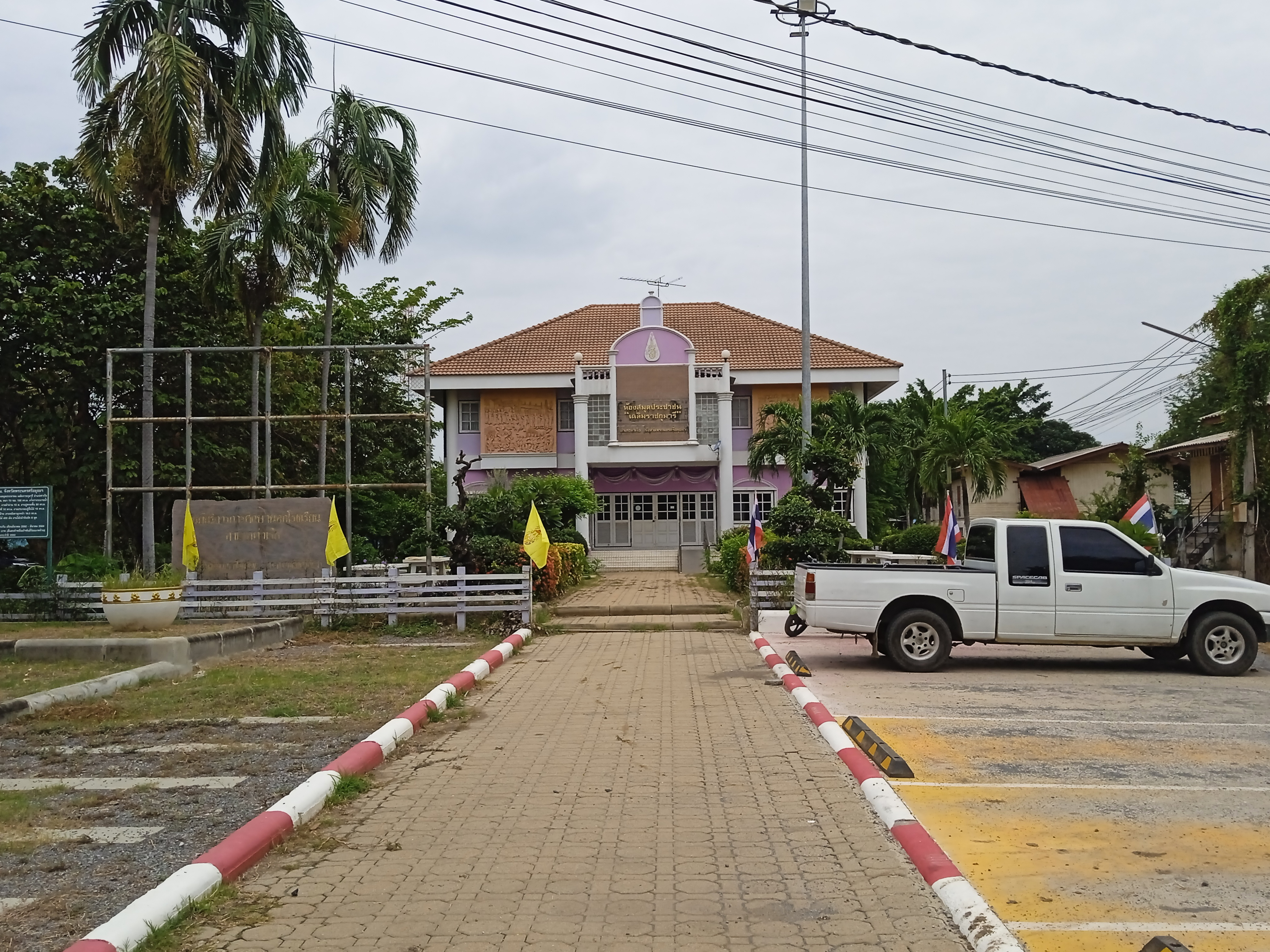
- Public Library "Her Royal Highness Princess Maha Chakri Sirindhorn" at Tha Ruea

- District location in Phra Nakhon Si Ayutthaya province
- Coordinates: 14°33′6″N 100°43′39″E
- Country: Thailand
- Province: Ayutthaya
- Seat: Tha Chao Sanook
- Tambon: 10
- Muban: 84

Area
  - Total: 106.2 km^{2} (41.0 sq mi)

Population (2018)
  - Total: 46,925
  - Density: 441.9/km^{2} (1,145/sq mi)
- Time zone: UTC+7 (ICT)
- Postal code: 13130
- Geocode: 1402

Tha Ruea (Thai: ท่าเรือ, pronounced [tʰâː rɯ̄a̯]) is a district (amphoe) in northeastern part of Phra Nakhon Si Ayutthaya province, central Thailand.

== History ==
The original name of the district was Nakhon Noi. In 1917, it was renamed Tha Ruea to commemorate an important event within the district. When the hunter Bun found the Buddha's footprint in Sara Buri province, King Songtham travelled by royal barge along the Pa Sak River to worship. He moored his royal barge in the district, and continued his travel overland. His route has since become a royal tradition, as later kings always travelled by this way to worship Buddha's footprint in Wat Phra Phutthabat. The Thai word "tha ruea" means "port" or "pier".

In 1965, Tha Ruea was the scene of a major robbery by three gangs, totaling 17 people. The robberies were a wet market and a police station. The robbers brazenly shot at the police station, as if they had no fear of the law. Eventually, the robbers were caught, some of them were extrajudicially executed, and six were sentenced to public firing squads the following year. The event inspired the 2004 film Siames Outlaws.

== Geography ==
Neighbouring districts are (from the north clockwise) Don Phut, Ban Mo, Sao Hai, Nong Saeng of Saraburi province, and Phachi and Nakhon Luang of Ayutthaya Province.

== Administration ==
=== Provincial government ===
The district is divided into 10 subdistricts (tambons), which are further subdivided into 84 villages (mubans).

Subdistricts (Tambons)
#	Name	Thai	Vil.	Pop.
1	Tha Ruea	ท่าเรือ	-	6,768
2	Champa	จำปา	9	8,760
3	Tha Luang	ท่าหลวง	10	5,856
4	Ban Rom	บ้านร่อม	9	3,073
5	Sala Loi	ศาลาลอย	15	4,794
6	Wang Daeng	วังแดง	8	3,185
7	Pho En	โพธิ์เอน	6	3,143
8	Pak Tha	ปากท่า	8	2,882
9	Nong Khanak	หนองขนาก	10	4,561
10	Tha Chao Sanook	ท่าเจ้าสนุก	9	3,903
		Total:	84	46,925

=== Local government ===
As of 31 December 2018 there are two subdistrict municipalities (thesaban tambon) in the district. The non-municipal areas are administered by nine Subdistrict Administrative Organizations - SAO (ongkan borihan suan tambon).

1	Tha Luang subdistrict municipality	Pop.
	Subdistrict Champa	5,873
	Subdistrict Tha Luang	2,900
	Total population	8,773
2	Tha Ruea subdistrict municipality	6,768

Subdistrict Administration Organizations
#	Name	Thai	Pop.
1	Champa SAO	จำปา	2,887
2	Tha Luang SAO	ท่าหลวง	2,956
3	Ban Rom SAO	บ้านร่อม	3,073
4	Sala Loi SAO	ศาลาลอย	4,794
5	Wang Daeng SAO	วังแดง	3,185
6	Pho En SAO	โพธิ์เอน	3,143
7	Pak Tha SAO	ปากท่า	2,882
8	Nong Khanak SAO	หนองขนาก	4,561
9	Tha Chao Sanook SAO	ท่าเจ้าสนุก	3,903
		Total:	31,384

== Transportation ==
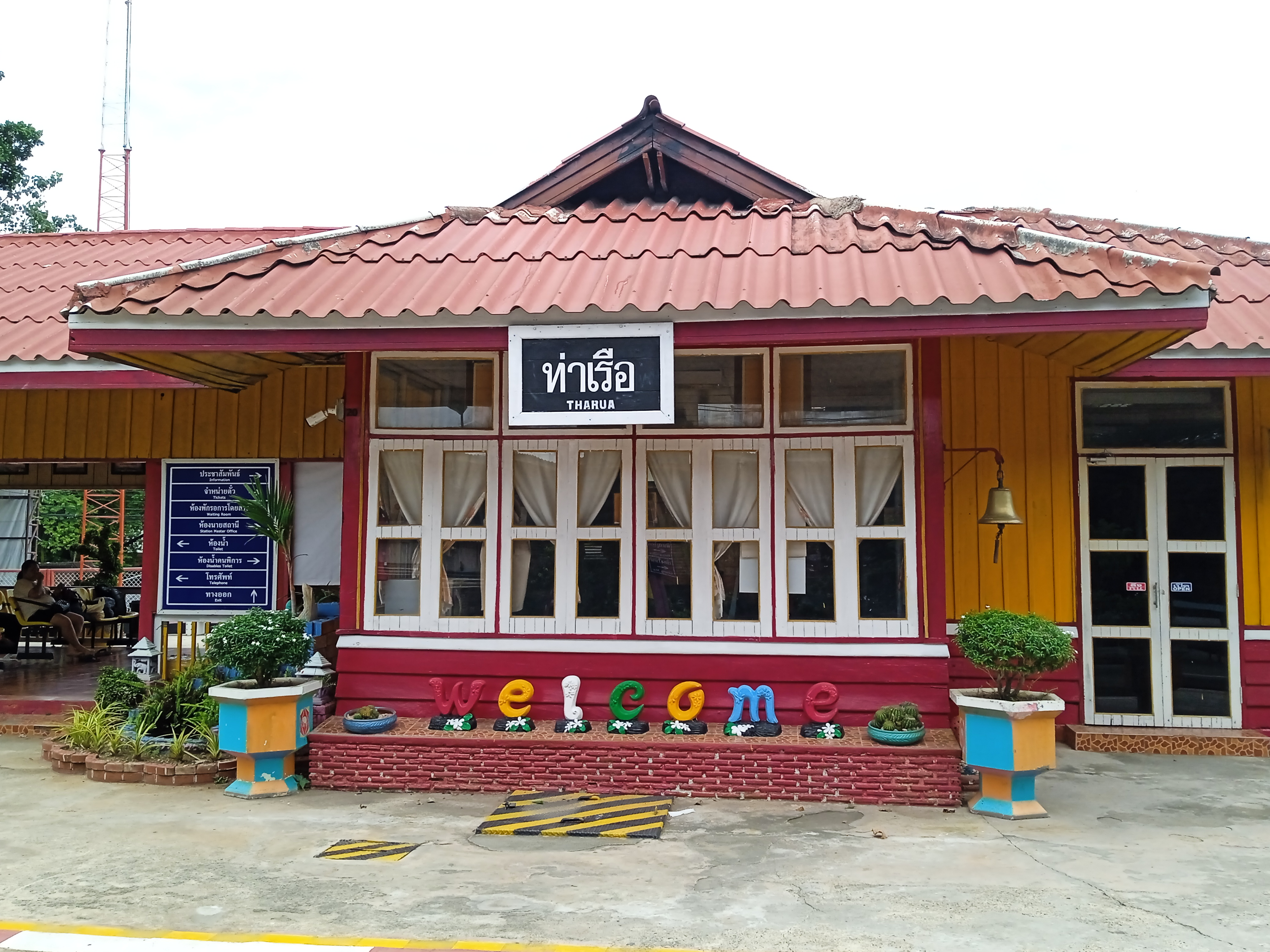
Tha Ruea railway station

- Northern Line of Thailand Railways passes through the district. Stations are Tha Ruea, Nong Wiwat, and Ban Plak Raet. It connects the district with Ayutthaya and Bangkok.
