= Ban Mo district =

Ban Mo บ้านหมอ
- District
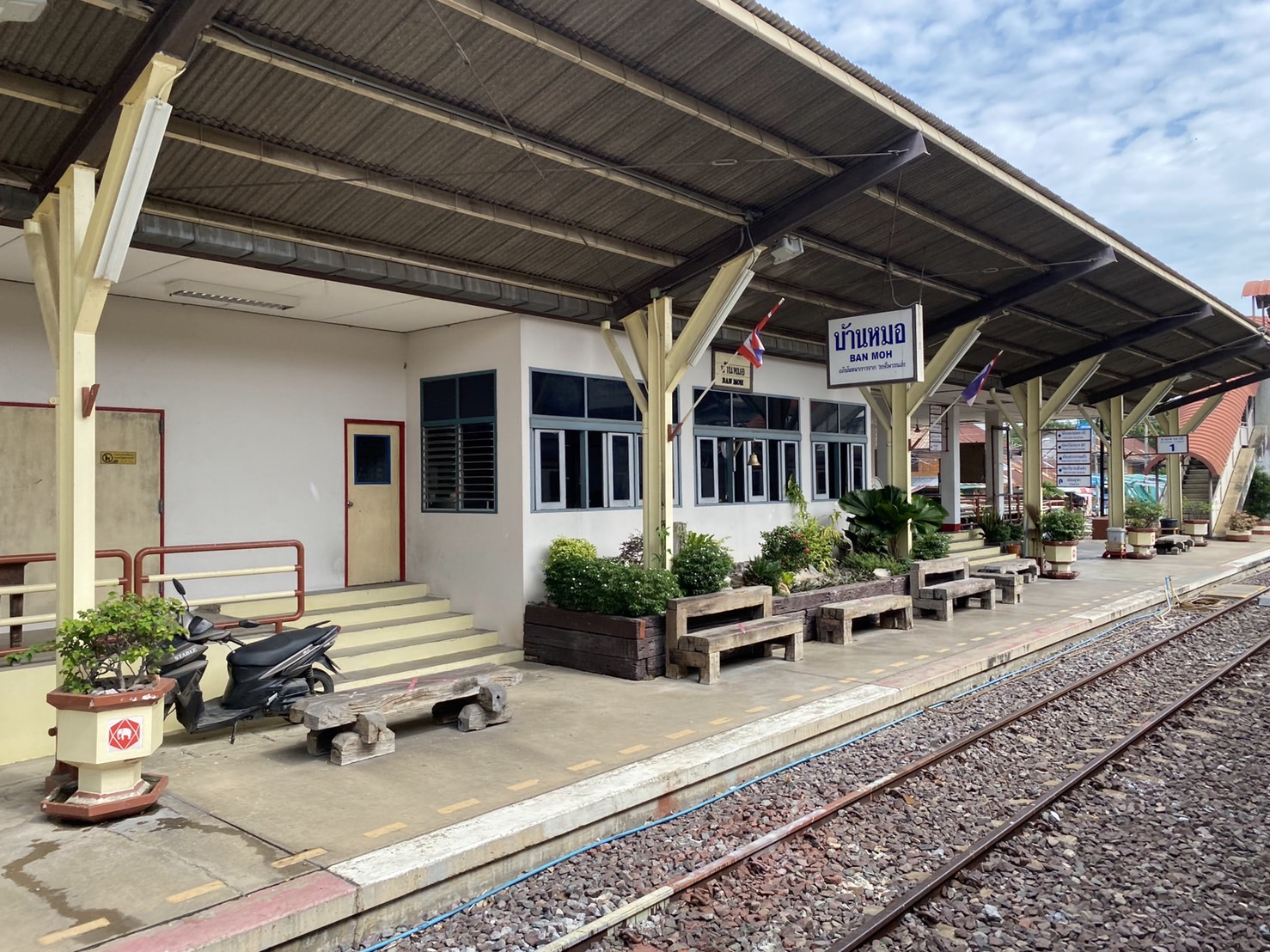
- Ban Mo Railway Station

- District location in Saraburi province
- Coordinates: 14°36′56″N 100°43′38″E
- Country: Thailand
- Province: Saraburi

Area
  - Total: 203.6 km^{2} (78.6 sq mi)

Population (2000)
  - Total: 39,489
  - Density: 194.0/km^{2} (502.3/sq mi)
- Time zone: UTC+7 (ICT)
- Postal code: 18130
- Geocode: 1906

Ban Mo (Thai: บ้านหมอ, pronounced [bâːn mɔ̌ː]) is a district (amphoe) in the northwestern part of Saraburi province, central Thailand.

== History ==
After the Buddha footprint near Saraburi was found and a temple was built, King Songtham hired Dutch engineers to build a road from Tha Ruea to Wat Phra Phutthabat to make the pilgrimage there easier. Elephants did the heavy lifting. When the elephants got sick, they were cured at Wat Khok (later called Wat Khok Ban Mo and Wat Ban Mo finally), which thus gave the district its name. Because Ban Mo literally means "home of doctor".

== Geography ==
Neighboring districts are (from the west clockwise) Don Phut, Nong Don, Phra Phutthabat, Sao Hai of Saraburi Province, and Tha Ruea of Ayutthaya province.

== Administration ==
The district is divided into nine sub-districts (tambons).

No.	Name	Thai
1.	Ban Mo	บ้านหมอ
2.	Bang Khamot	บางโขมด
3.	Sang Sok	สร่างโศก
4.	Talat Noi	ตลาดน้อย
5.	Horathep	หรเทพ
6.	Khok Yai	โคกใหญ่
7.	Phai Khwang	ไผ่ขวาง
8.	Ban Khrua	บ้านครัว
9.	Nong Bua	หนองบัว

== Transportation ==
Ban Mo accessible by Northern Railway, Ban Mo Railway Station is the only station of the district, it is middle between Tha Ruea (Ayutthaya) and Nong Don (Saraburi) Railway Stations.

== Economy ==
Ban Mo can be considered as the area that has grown the most Melientha suavis in the country, with a total area of more than 1,000 rai (160 ha; 400 acres). Taro is another important food crop.
