= Ban Mo railway station =

Railway station in Thailand

Ban Mo บ้านหมอ
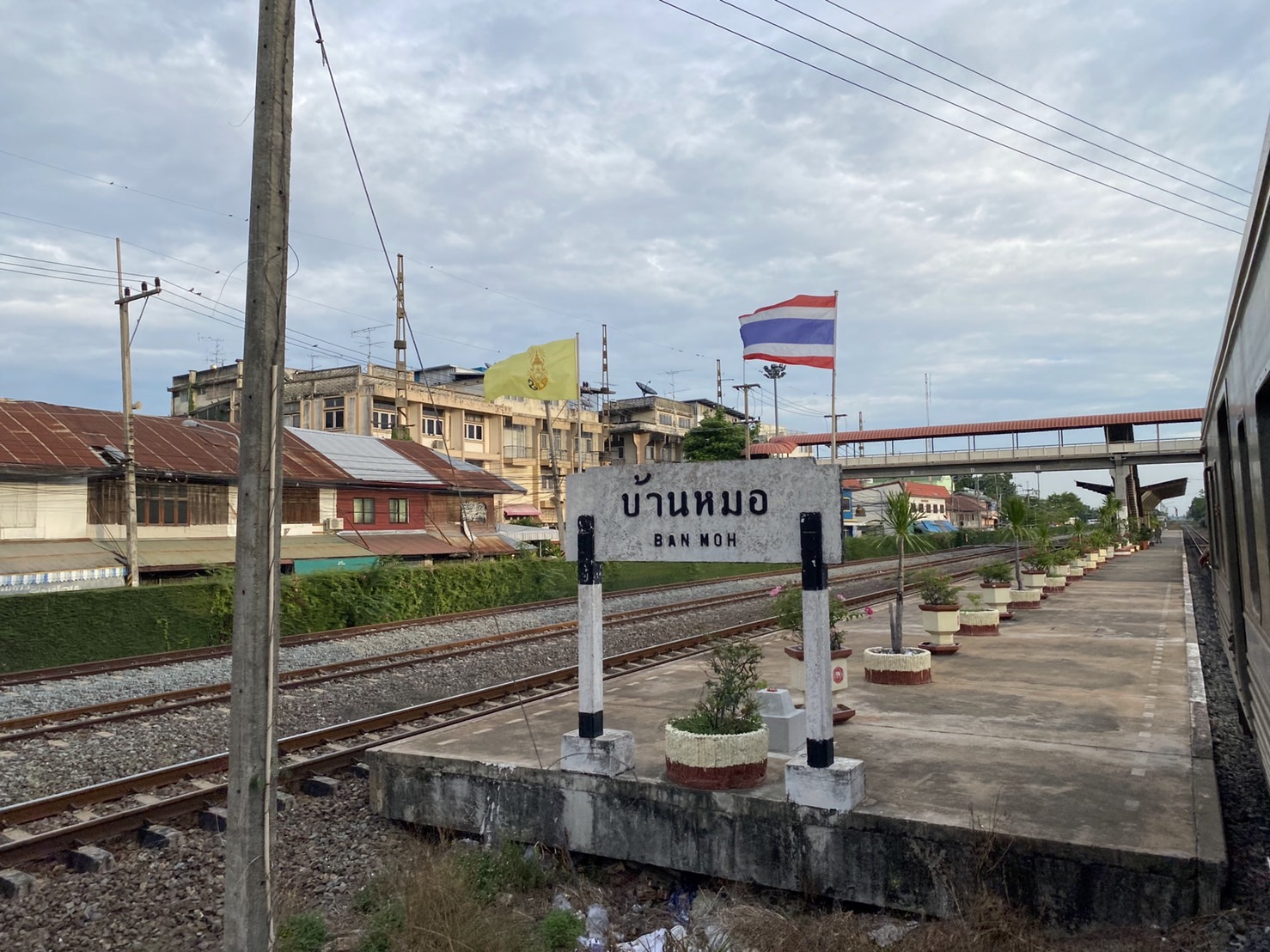
- Station sign

General information
- Location: Ban Mo Subdistrict, Ban Mo District, Saraburi; Thailand
- Coordinates: 14.6167°N 100.7263°E
- Owner: State Railway of Thailand
- Line: Northern Line
- Platforms: 3
- Tracks: 5

Other information
- Station code: มอ.

Services
Preceding station	State Railway of Thailand	Following station
Tha Ruea towards Hua Lamphong or Krung Thep Aphiwat	Northern Line	Nong Don towards Chiang Mai
Location

Ban Mo station (Thai: สถานีบ้านหมอ) is a railway station located in Ban Mo Subdistrict, Ban Mo District, Saraburi. It is a class 1 railway station located 108.787 km (67.6 mi) from Bangkok railway station.
