= Ban Khrua, Saraburi =

Ban Khrua Thai: บ้านครัว
- Tambon
- Etymology: "Hamlet of Households"
- Interactive map of Ban Khrua
- Coordinates: 14°35′19.08″N 100°45′48.52″E
- Country: Thailand
- Province: Saraburi
- District: Ban Mo
- Named for: Local history

Government
  - Type: Subdistrict Municipality
  - Mayor: Niramon Timpitak
  - Deputy Mayor: Sakhonchai Atipanyakom
  - Deputy Mayor: Somkiat Tiatrakul

Area
  - Total: 11.83 km^{2} (4.57 sq mi)

Population (December 2020)
  - Total: 7,888
  - Density: 668.05/km^{2} (1,730.2/sq mi)
- Time zone: UTC+7 (ICT)
- Postcode: 18270
- Area code: (+66) 02

Ban Khrua (Thai: บ้านครัว, pronounced [bâːn kʰrūa̯]) is a tambon (subdistrict) of Ban Mo district, Saraburi province.

== History and toponymy ==
The name Ban Khura literally translates as "hamlet of households," referring to a settlement for Lao Wiang people from present-day Vientiane, who immigrated with their entire families. It is not related to Ban Khrua in Bangkok, although the two names share a similar-sounding root.

Ban Khrua and its surrounding areas have, however, been inhabited since prehistoric times and served as a metal-smelting site during the Dvaravati period, part of the Lavo Kingdom, around 2,000 years ago.

Historically, Ban Khura was the birthplace and residence of Nai Chan (also known as I Chan), the half-brother of Khun Worawongsathirat (birth name Bun Si). When Khun Worawongsathirat became the usurper king of Ayutthaya in 1548, he appointed Nai Chan as Upparat (viceroy). The Ayutthaya chronicles refer to him as Nai Chan of Ban Maha Lok; he was a swordsmith by profession. At that time, Ban Khrua was known as Ban Maha Lok (บ้านมหาโลก, pronounced [bâːn mā.hǎː lôːk]), with Wat Maha Lok as its center, a temple that still exists today.

It is also believed that Ban Khura may have been the native land of Khun Worawongsathirat, who was once a royal Brahmin, and served as the place where his armed troops were gathered, later playing an important role in his rise to power.

Khun Worawongsathirat and Nai Chan, together with Lady Sisudachan, were believed to be descendants of the Uthong dynasty, which had previously ruled Ayutthaya before being succeeded by the Suphanaphum dynasty. They therefore conspired to reclaim the throne from the Suphanaphum king.

== Geography ==
The terrain is a lowland with the Pa Sak river crossing through it. Ban Khrua is approximately 6 km (3.7 mi) east of Ban Mo downtown and 25 km (15.5 mi) from Saraburi city. Ban Khrua has a total area of 11.83 km^{2}.

== Administration ==
The subdistrict is under the administration of Tha Lan Subdistrict Municipality.

It is also divided into 25 administrative mubans (villages).

No.	Name	Thai
1.	Ban Khrua	บ้านครัว
2.	Ban Bang Khwan	บ้านบางขวัญ
3.	Ban Thara Rat	บ้านธารารัตน์
4.	Ban Muang Noi	บ้านม่วงน้อย
5.	Ban Nong Luang-Nong Takong	บ้านหนองหลวง-หนองตะกอง
6.	Ban Santisuk	บ้านสันติสุข
7.	Ban Maha Lok	บ้านมหาโลก
8.	Ban Noi-Ban Yai	บ้านน้อย-บ้านใหญ่
9.	Ban Nong Sadao	บ้านหนองสะเดา
10.	Ban Talat Mai	บ้านตลาดใหม่
11.	Ban Tha Lan	บ้านท่าลาน
12.	Ban Hua Kong Lek	บ้านหัวกองเหล็ก
13.	Ban Saphan 1	บ้านสะพาน 1
14.	Ban Dan Ling	บ้านด่านลิง
15.	Ban Hua Prachae	บ้านหัวประแจ
16.	Ban Yanhee	บ้านยันฮี
17.	Ban Khrua	บ้านครัว
18.	Ban Khrua	บ้านครัว
19.	Ban Chi Hom	บ้านชีหอม
20.	Ban Nong Luang	บ้านหนองหลวง
21.	Ban Muang Noi	บ้านม่วงน้อย
22.	Ban Maha Lok	บ้านมหาโลก
23.	Ban Nong Sadao	บ้านหนองสะเดา
24.	Ban Talat Mai	บ้านตลาดใหม่
23.	Ban Kong Lek	บ้านกองเหล็ก
24.	Ban Dan Ling	บ้านด่านลิง
25.	Ban Saphan 12	บ้านสะพาน 12
