= Talat Noi Subdistrict =

Talat Noi Subdistrict may refer to:

- Talat Noi, a neighbourhood and subdistrict (khwaeng) in Bangkok
- Talat Noi, a subdistrict (tambon) in Ban Mo District, Saraburi Province
