= Nakhon Luang district =

Nakhon Luang นครหลวง
- District
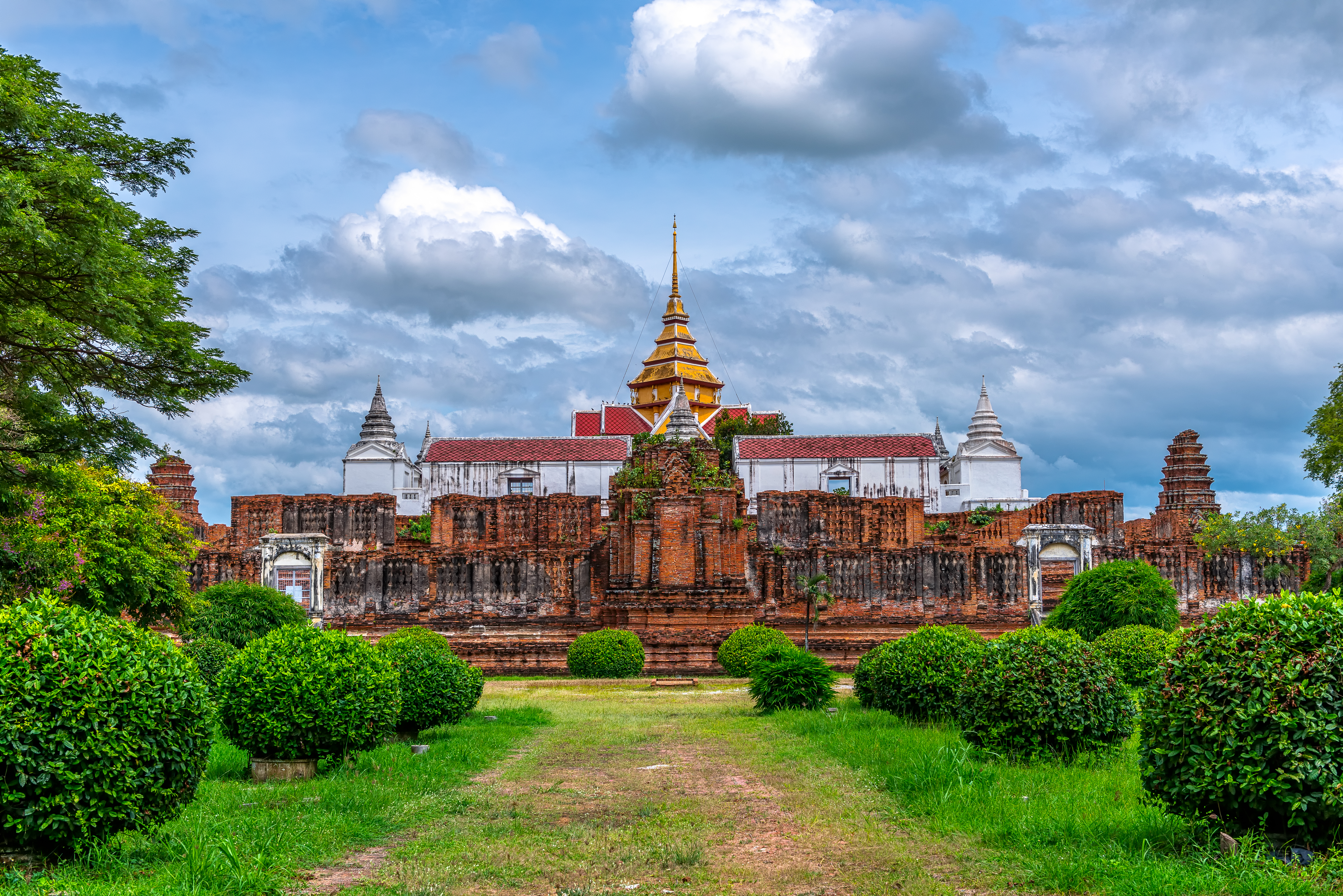
- Prasat Nakhon Luang, a local ancient building and origin name of the district

- Famous Arunyik Knife; Grandiosely Nakhonluang Castle; Booming in industry And Agriculture; Excellence Thai intellect
- Coordinates: 14°27′51″N 100°36′20″E
- Country: Thailand
- Province: Ayutthaya
- Seat: Nakhon Luang

Area
  - Total: 198.917 km^{2} (76.802 sq mi)

Population (2015)
  - Total: 36,705
  - Density: 166.9/km^{2} (432/sq mi)
- Time zone: UTC+7 (ICT)
- Postal code: 13260
- Geocode: 1403

Nakhon Luang (Thai: นครหลวง, pronounced [ná(ʔ).kʰɔ̄ːn lǔaŋ]) is a district (amphoe) in the northeastern part of Ayutthaya province, central Thailand.

== History ==
The district was originally part of Nakhon Luang Noi district (now named Bang Pahan), and was established as a separate district in 1895.

In 1903 the district office was moved into Nakhon Luang Sub-district, and therefore the district was renamed from Nakhon Klang to Nakhon Luang.

== Geography ==
Neighbouring districts are (from the north clockwise) Don Phut of Saraburi province and Tha Ruea, Phachi, Uthai, Phra Nakhon Si Ayutthaya and Bang Pahan of Ayutthaya Province.

== Administration ==
=== Central administration ===
Nakhon Luang is divided into 12 sub-districts (tambon), which are further subdivided into 74 administrative villages (muban).

| No. | Name | Thai | Villages | Pop. |
|---|---|---|---|---|
| 1. | Nakhon Luang | นครหลวง | 9 | 4,644 |
| 2. | Tha Chang | ท่าช้าง | 8 | 4,544 |
| 3. | Bo Phong | บ่อโพง | 7 | 5,296 |
| 4. | Ban Chung | บ้านชุ้ง | 7 | 3,663 |
| 5. | Pak Chan | ปากจั่น | 6 | 3,447 |
| 6. | Bang Rakam | บางระกำ | 6 | 3,112 |
| 7. | Bang Phra Khru | บางพระครู | 4 | 2,243 |
| 8. | Mae La | แม่ลา | 6 | 1,984 |
| 9. | Nong Pling | หนองปลิง | 5 | 2,147 |
| 10. | Khlong Sakae | คลองสะแก | 5 | 2,236 |
| 11. | Sam Thai | สามไถ | 4 | 1,297 |
| 12. | Phra Non | พระนอน | 7 | 2,092 |

=== Local administration ===
There are three sub-district municipalities (thesaban tambon) in the district:

- Nakhon Luang (Thai: เทศบาลตำบลนครหลวง) consisting of the sub-district Nakhon Luang and parts of the sub-districts Bang Rakam and Bang Phra Khru.
- Aranyik (Thai: เทศบาลตำบลอรัญญิก) consisting of the sub-districts Tha Chang, Sam Thai, and Phra Non.
- Bo Phong (Thai: เทศบาลตำบลบ่อโพง) consisting of the sub-district Bo Phong.

There are five sub-district administrative organizations (SAO) in the district:

- Ban Chung (Thai: องค์การบริหารส่วนตำบลบ้านชุ้ง) consisting of the sub-district Ban Chung.
- Pak Chan (Thai: องค์การบริหารส่วนตำบลปากจั่น) consisting of the sub-district Pak Chan.
- Mae La (Thai: องค์การบริหารส่วนตำบลแม่ลา) consisting of the sub-district Mae La and parts of sub-districts Bang Rakam and Bang Phra Khru.
- Nong Pling (Thai: องค์การบริหารส่วนตำบลหนองปลิง) consisting of the sub-district Nong Pling.
- Khlong Sakae (Thai: องค์การบริหารส่วนตำบลคลองสะแก) consisting of the sub-district Khlong Sakae.
