= Phra Phutthabat district =

Phra Phutthabat พระพุทธบาท
- District
- District location in Saraburi province
- Coordinates: 14°43′32″N 100°47′43″E
- Country: Thailand
- Province: Saraburi
- Seat: Phra Phutthabat

Area
  - Total: 287.1 km^{2} (110.8 sq mi)

Population (2000)
  - Total: 70.354
  - Density: 0.2451/km^{2} (0.6347/sq mi)
- Time zone: UTC+7 (ICT)
- Postal code: 18120
- Geocode: 1909

Phra Phutthabat (Thai: พระพุทธบาท) is a district (amphoe) in Saraburi province, Thailand.

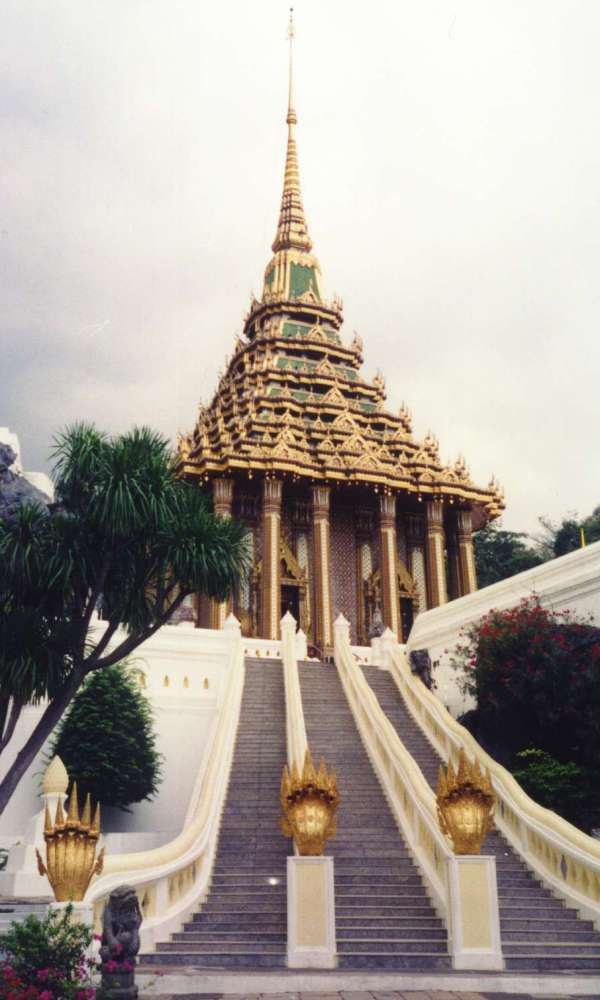
Wat Phra Buddha Baat

The district is named after the Phra Phutthabat Temple. Another well-known temple in the district is Wat Tham Krabok, both as a Hmong refugee camp and for its drug rehabilitation program.

== Geography ==
Neighbouring districts are (clockwise from the north): Mueang Lopburi and Phatthana Nikhom of Lopburi province; and Chaloem Phra Kiat, Sao Hai, Ban Mo, Nong Don.

== Administration ==
Phra Phuttabat is divided into nine sub-districts (tambons), which are further divided into 67 villages (mubans).

No.	Name	Thai name
1.	Phra Phutthabat	พระพุทธบาท
2.	Khun Khlon	ขุนโขลน
3.	Than Kasem	ธารเกษม
4.	Na Yao	นายาว
5.	Phu Kham Chan	พุคำจาน

No.	Name	Thai name
6.	Khao Wong	เขาวง
7.	Huai Pa Wai	ห้วยป่าหวาย
8.	Phu Krang	พุกร่าง
9.	Nong Kae	หนองแก
