= Ban Plak Raet railway halt =

Railway halt in Tha Chao Sanuk, Thailand

Coordinates: 14°31′48.4″N 100°43′33.8″E

Ban Plak Raet บ้านปลักแรด

General information
- Location: National Highway No.3008, Tha Chao Sanuk Subdistrict, Phachi District, Phra Nakhon Si Ayutthaya; Thailand
- Owner: State Railway of Thailand
- Line: Northern Line

Other information
- Station code: แด.

Services
Preceding station	State Railway of Thailand	Following station
Nong Wiwat towards Hua Lamphong or Krung Thep Aphiwat	Northern Line	Tha Ruea towards Chiang Mai
Location

Ban Plak Raet Halt (Thai: ที่หยุดรถบ้านปลักแรด) is a railway halt located in Tha Chao Sanuk Subdistrict, Tha Ruea District, Phra Nakhon Si Ayutthaya province, Thailand. It is located 99.165 km (61.6 mi) from Bangkok Railway Station.
