= Nong Wiwat railway station =

Railway station in Nong Khanak, Thailand

Coordinates: 14.5057°N 100.7271°E

Nong Wiwat หนองวิวัฒน์

General information
- Location: Nong Khanak Subdistrict, Tha Ruea District, Phra Nakhon Si Ayutthaya
- Owner: State Railway of Thailand
- Line: Northern Line
- Platforms: 3
- Tracks: 3

Other information
- Station code: วิ.

Services
Preceding station	State Railway of Thailand	Following station
Don Ya Nang Halt towards Hua Lamphong or Krung Thep Aphiwat	Northern Line	Ban Plak Raet Halt towards Chiang Mai
Location

Nong Wiwat railway station is a railway station located in Nong Khanak Subdistrict, Tha Ruea District, Phra Nakhon Si Ayutthaya. It is a class 3 railway station located 96.447 km (59.9 mi) from Bangkok railway station.
