= Sao Hai district =

Sao Hai เสาไห้
- District
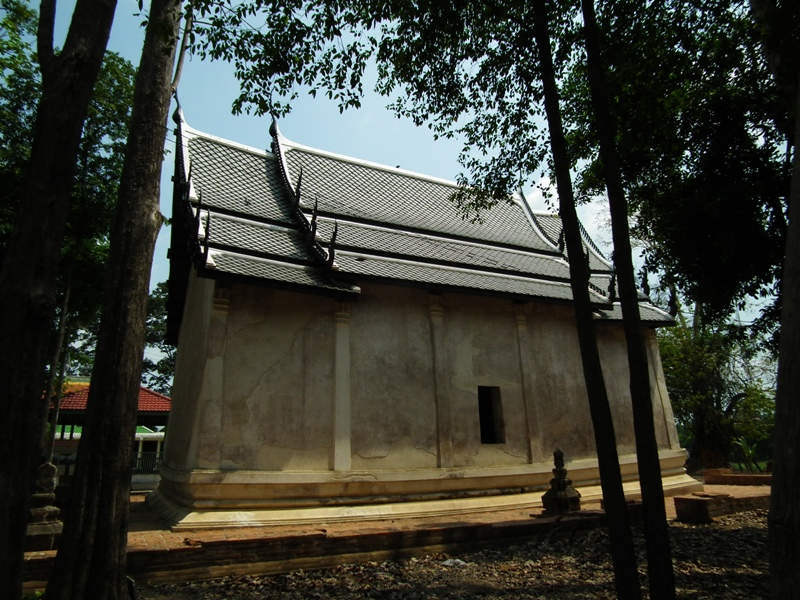
- Wat Chung Temple

- District location in Saraburi province
- Coordinates: 14°33′1″N 100°51′27″E
- Country: Thailand
- Province: Saraburi
- Seat: Sao Hai

Area
  - Total: 111.8 km^{2} (43.2 sq mi)

Population (2005)
  - Total: 30,292
  - Density: 270.9/km^{2} (701.8/sq mi)
- Time zone: UTC+7 (ICT)
- Postal code: 18160
- Geocode: 1910

Sao Hai (Thai: เสาไห้, pronounced [sǎw hâj]) is a district (amphoe) in Saraburi province, central Thailand.

== History ==
In 1549, King Maha Chakkraphat ordered the separation of Mueang Lopburi and Nakhon Nayok to create Mueang Saraburi. The first record of a central district office is in Sao Hai at Tambon Sala Li Lao. The Mueang Saraburi office was moved to Tambon Pak Phriaw, Mueang Saraburi district in 1896. At the same time, the Sao Hai district office was moved to Tambon Suan Dokmai. Three years later it was moved again to Tambon Sao Hai near Chao Poo Shrine. In 1924 the owner of Sao Hai fresh market donated 12,800 m^{2} of land about 500 m from the old location to build a new district office and police station for the district.

The name of the district means 'crying pillar', which originates from a local legend. At the time the city pillar of Bangkok was built, the king asked for the most beautiful pillars from all over the country to be sent to the capital. The one sent from Saraburi was nearly perfect, but it arrived after a pillar had been chosen and thus was only made a secondary pillar. The pillar became very sad, floated back to Saraburi on the Chao Phraya and Pa Sak Rivers, and sunk there. Later villagers heard the wails and erected the pillar there, which gave the tambon and thus the district its name. It is now in the Chao Mae Takhian Tong Shrine within the Wat Sung Temple, near the district office of Sao Hai District.

== Geography ==
Neighbouring districts are (from the northwest clockwise) Ban Mo, Phra Phutthabat, Chaloem Phra Kiat, Mueang Saraburi, and Nong Saeng of Saraburi Province; and Tha Ruea of Phra Nakhon Si Ayutthaya province.

The main river of the district is the Pa Sak River.

== Administration ==
The district is divided into 12 sub-districts (tambon), which are further subdivided into 103 villages (muban). There are three townships (thesaban tambon): Sao Hai and Ban Yang each cover parts of the same-named tambon, Suan Dok Mai covers tambon Suan Dok Mai. There are a further 12 tambon administrative organizations (TAO).

No.	Name	Thai name	Villages	Pop.
1.	Sao Hai	เสาไห้	7	3,129
2.	Ban Yang	บ้านยาง	15	3,457
3.	Hua Pluak	หัวปลวก	12	2,560
4.	Ngio Ngam	งิ้วงาม	6	1,051
5.	Sala Ri Thai	ศาลารีไทย	5	1,135
6.	Ton Tan	ต้นตาล	8	1,823
7.	Tha Chang	ท่าช้าง	8	1,454
8.	Phraya Thot	พระยาทด	7	1,881
9.	Muang Ngam	ม่วงงาม	8	2,174
10.	Roeng Rang	เริงราง	7	3,006
11.	Mueang Kao	เมืองเก่า	9	3,232
12.	Suan Dok Mai	สวนดอกไม้	11	5,390

== Economy ==
The district is renowned for its signature product, Sao Hai Rice, also known as Jek Chuey Sao Hai Rice. This traditional rice variety has long been cultivated in the area, which is recognized as its original place of production. In 2008, it was officially registered as a Geographical Indication (GI) product.
