= Don Ya Nang railway halt =

Railway stop in Don Ya Nang, Thailand

Don Ya Nang ดอนหญ้านาง

General information
- Location: Don Ya Nang Subdistrict, Phachi District, Phra Nakhon Si Ayutthaya
- Owner: State Railway of Thailand
- Line: Northern Line

Other information
- Station code: ญา.

Services
| Preceding station | State Railway of Thailand | Following station |
|---|---|---|
| Ban Phachi Junction towards Hua Lamphong or Krung Thep Aphiwat | Northern Line | Nong Wiwat towards Chiang Mai |
Location

Don Ya Nang Halt (Thai: ที่หยุดรถดอนหญ้านาง) is a railway halt located in Don Ya Nang Subdistrict, Phachi District, Phra Nakhon Si Ayutthaya. It is located 93.583 km (58.1 mi) from Bangkok Railway Station.
