= Chaloem Phra Kiat district, Saraburi =

Chaloem Phra Kiat เฉลิมพระเกียรติ
- District
- District location in Saraburi province
- Coordinates: 14°36′41″N 100°54′31″E
- Country: Thailand
- Province: Saraburi
- Seat: Khao Din Phatthana

Area
  - Total: 150.6 km^{2} (58.1 sq mi)

Population (2000)
  - Total: 25,616
  - Density: 170.1/km^{2} (440.5/sq mi)
- Time zone: UTC+7 (ICT)
- Postal code: 18000
- Geocode: 1913

Chaloem Phra Kiat District, Saraburi (Thai: เฉลิมพระเกียรติ, pronounced [t͡ɕʰā.lɤ̌ːm pʰráʔ kìa̯t]) is a district (amphoe) in the northern part of Saraburi province, central Thailand.

== History ==
Tambons Huai Bong, Ban Keng, Khao Din Phatthana, Phu Khae, and Na Phra Lan were separated from Mueang Saraburi district to create the new district on 5 December 1996, as one of five districts named Chaloem Phra Kiat commemorating the 50th anniversary of the ascension to the throne of King Bhumibol Adulyadej (Rama IX). This area was selected because there is a royal project in the district at Wat Mongkhon Chaiphatthana managed by the Chaiphatthana Foundation.

== Geography ==
Neighbouring districts are (from the north clockwise) Phattana Nikhom of Lopburi province, Kaeng Khoi, Mueang Saraburi, Sao Hai and Phra Phutthabat of Saraburi Province.

== Administration ==
The district is divided into six sub-districts (tambons), which are further subdivided into 51 villages (mubans). Na Phra Lan has township (thesaban tambon) status and covers parts of the same-named tambon. Each of the six tambons is administered by a tambon administrative organization (TAO).

No.	Name	Thai name	Villages	Pop.
1.	Khao Din Phatthana	เขาดินพัฒนา	7	2,456
2.	Ban Kaeng	บ้านแก้ง	8	2,879
3.	Phueng Ruang	ผึ้งรวง	5	2,112
4.	Phu Khae	พุแค	10	5,935
5.	Huai Bong	ห้วยบง	9	3,965
6.	Na Phra Lan	หน้าพระลาน	12	13,275

== Environment ==
Tambon Na Phra Lan may be the sub-district with the worst air quality in Thailand. The Saraburi Provincial Industry Office counts 133 cement or aggregate plants, 17 mining sites, 32 stone milling plants, and 22 stone dressing plants in the vicinity. PM_{10} particles in the air are roughly three times higher than the mandated 120 micrograms per cubic meter permitted by air quality standards. Levels of PM_{2.5} ranged from 45-79 μg/m^{3}. Thailand's PM_{2.5} maximum recommendation is 50 μg/m^{3} and that of the World Health Organization (WHO) is 25 μg/m^{3}.

In 2018, 165 days of the year exceeded particulate matter limits in Na Phra Lan, a 27% increase over 2017. Particulates measured between 27-303 μg/m^{3}. Sources were industrial plants, rock mines, dense traffic, and "ruined roads".
