= Nong Don district =

Nong Don หนองโดน
- District
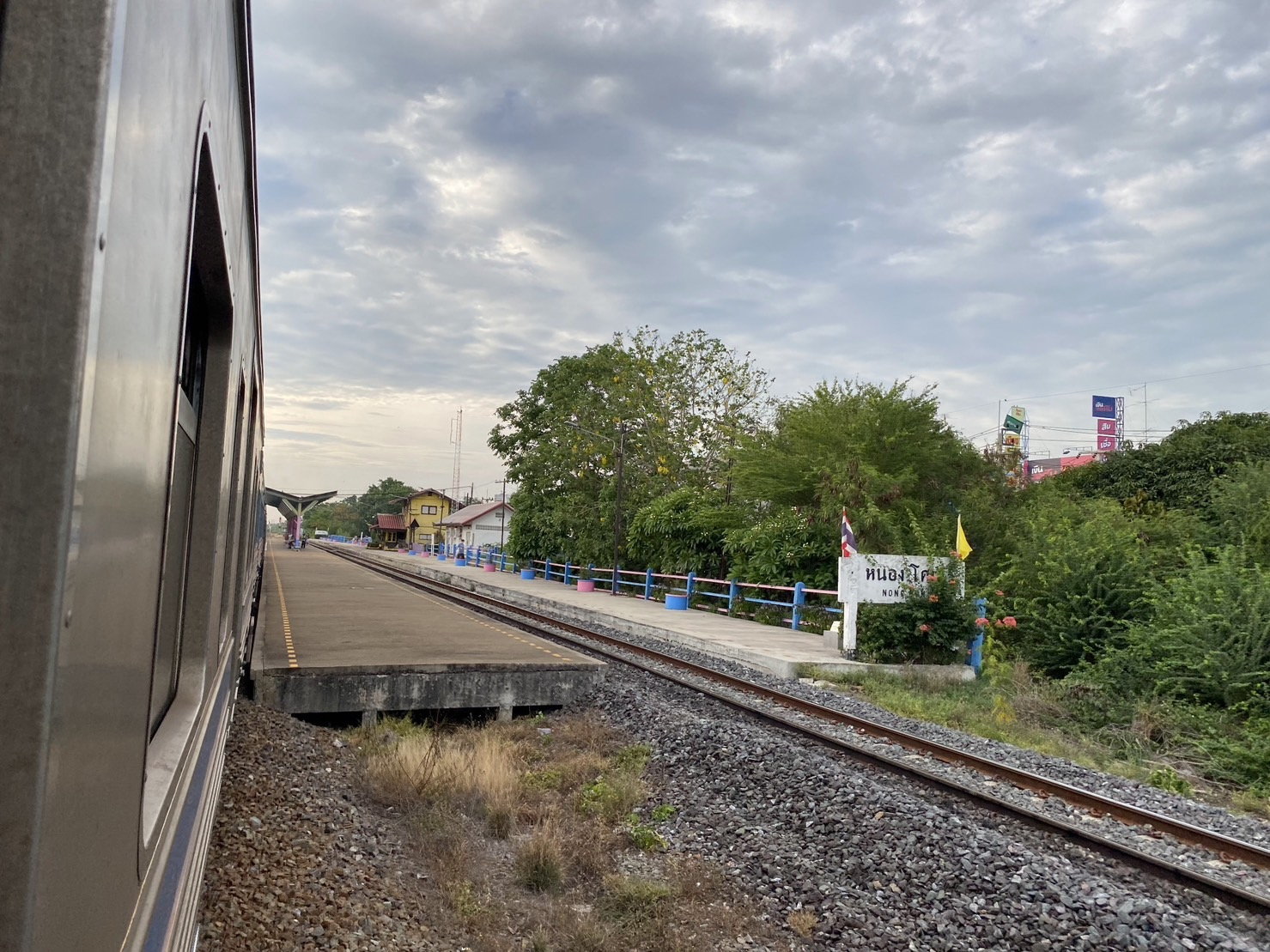
- Nong Don railway station in September 2022

- District location in Saraburi province
- Coordinates: 14°40′52″N 100°42′30″E
- Country: Thailand
- Province: Saraburi
- Seat: Nong Don

Area
  - Total: 88.07 km^{2} (34.00 sq mi)

Population (2000)
  - Total: 13,876
  - Density: 157.6/km^{2} (408.1/sq mi)
- Time zone: UTC+7 (ICT)
- Postal code: 18190
- Geocode: 1908

Nong Don (Thai: หนองโดน, pronounced [nɔ̌ːŋ dōːn]) is a district (amphoe) in the northwestern part of Saraburi province in central Thailand.

== History ==
Ten kilometres from Bang Khamoad (today's Ban Mo district) there is a big pond. The west side of the pond has a big tummy-wood tree (Careya sphaerica Roxb.) or in Thai Kradon (ต้นกระโดน). The people from Dong Noi and Kokko and Mueang Lop Buri moved to here and established the village Ban Nong Kradon. When the village grew bigger, the government created a separate minor district (king amphoe) Nong Don on 15 July 1968, when the three tambons Nong Don, Ban Klap, and Don Thong were split off from Ban Mo district.

The minor district was upgraded to a full district on 21 August 1975.

== Geography ==
Neighbouring districts are (from the north clockwise) Mueang Lopburi of Lopburi province, Phra Phutthabat, Ban Mo and Don Phut of Saraburi Province.

== Administration ==
The district is divided into four sub-districts (tambons), which are further subdivided into 34 villages (mubans). Nong Don has township (thesaban tambon) status and covers 1.94 km^{2} of tambon Nong Don. There are three Tambon administrative organizations (TAO); Ban Klab is also responsible for tambon Ban Prong.

No.	Name	Thai name	Villages	Pop.
1.	Nong Don	หนองโดน	11	5,562
2.	Ban Klap	บ้านกลับ	10	4,214
3.	Don Thong	ดอนทอง	8	2,792
4.	Ban Prong	บ้านโปร่ง	5	1,617

== Transportation ==
The district is crossed by the Northern Line of the State Railway of Thailand (SRT) with two stations: Nong Don (main station), Ban Klap (minor station).
