= Nong Don railway station =

Railway station in Thailand

Coordinates: 14.6835°N 100.7063°E

Nong Don หนองโดน
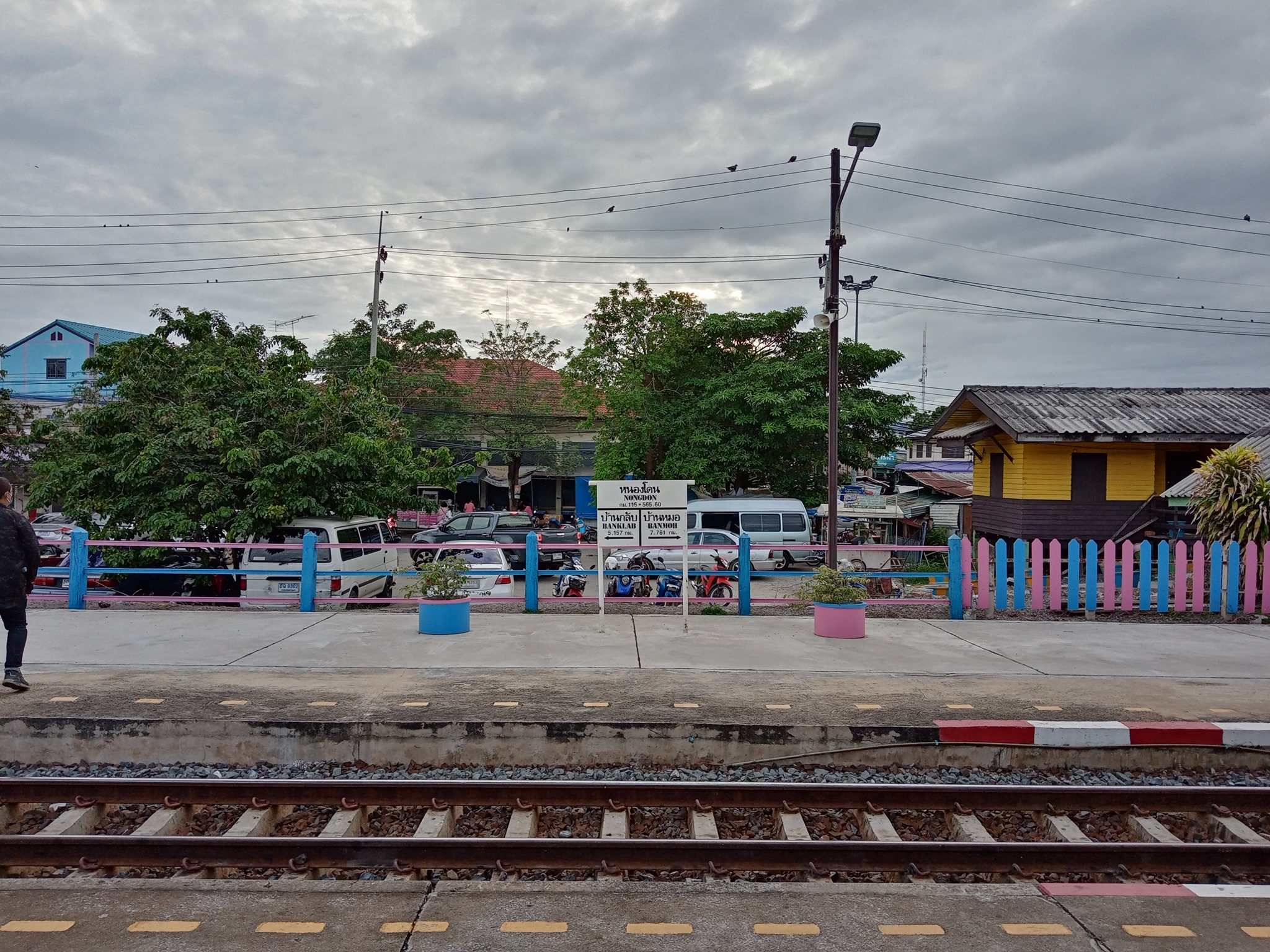

General information
- Location: Nong Don Subdistrict, Nong Don District, Saraburi
- Owner: State Railway of Thailand
- Line: Northern Line
- Platforms: 3
- Tracks: 3

Other information
- Station code: โด.

Services
Preceding station	State Railway of Thailand	Following station
Ban Mo towards Hua Lamphong or Krung Thep Aphiwat	Northern Line	Ban Klap Junction towards Chiang Mai
Location

Nong Don railway station is a railway station located in Nong Don Subdistrict, Nong Don District, Saraburi. It is a class 2 railway station located 116.565 km (72.4 mi) from Bangkok railway station.
