= Arthit Tanusorn =

Thai footballer

Personal information
- Full name: Arthit Tanusorn
- Date of birth: February 16, 1975 (age 51)
- Place of birth: Saraburi, Thailand
- Height: 1.70 m (5 ft 7 in)
- Position: Goalkeeper

Senior career*
Years	Team	Apps	(Gls)
1994–1995	Raj-Vithi		
1996–97	Stock Exchange of Thailand		
1998	Bangkok Metropolitan		
2005–2007	TOT		
2008	Thai Airways-Look Isan		
2009	Samut Prakan Customs United		
2010–2012	Chiangrai United		
2013	Ayutthaya		
2014	Chamchuri United		

Managerial career
- 2021: Prey Veng (goalkeeper Coach)
- 2021–2022: PT Prachuap (goalkeeper Coach)
- 2022–2023: DP Kanchanaburi (goalkeeper Coach)
- 2023: Saraburi United
- 2023–: DP Kanchanaburi (manager-assistant head coach)
- * Club domestic league appearances and goals as of 16 October 2012

Arthit Tanusorn (Thai อาทิตย์ ธนูศร) is a Thai retired footballer.
