= Don Phut district =

Don Phut ดอนพุด
- District
- District location in Saraburi province
- Coordinates: 14°35′32″N 100°37′42″E
- Country: Thailand
- Province: Saraburi
- Seat: Don Phut

Area
  - Total: 58.714 km^{2} (22.670 sq mi)

Population (2000)
  - Total: 6,957
  - Density: 118.5/km^{2} (306.9/sq mi)
- Time zone: UTC+7 (ICT)
- Postal code: 18210
- Geocode: 1907

Don Phut (Thai: ดอนพุด, pronounced [dɔ̄ːn pʰút]) is a district (amphoe) in the western part of Saraburi province, Thailand.

== History ==
Tambon Don Phut, Dong Ta Ngao, Ban Luang and Phai Lio were separated from Ban Mo district to create the minor district (king amphoe) Don Phut on 31 May 1971. It was upgraded to a full district on 4 November 1993.

Most of the inhabitants of this district are Phuan who migrated from Chiang Khong, Luang Phrabang and Vientiane in the reign of King Rama II.

== Geography ==
Neighboring districts are (from the north clockwise) Mueang Lopburi of Lopburi province, Nong Don and Ban Mo of Saraburi Province, Tha Ruea, Nakhon Luang, Maha Rat and Ban Phraek of Ayutthaya province.

== Administration ==
The district is divided into four sub-districts (tambons), which are further subdivided into 28 villages (mubans). Don Phut has township (thesaban tambon) status and covers all the tambons except Dong Ta Ngau. Dong Ta Ngau is administered by a Tambon Administrative Organization (TAO), the only one in the district.

| No. | Name | Thai name | Villages | Pop. |
|---|---|---|---|---|
| 1. | Don Phut | ดอนพุด | 5 | 1,615 |
| 2. | Phai Lio | ไผ่หลิ่ว | 7 | 1,352 |
| 3. | Ban Luang | บ้านหลวง | 7 | 1,701 |
| 4. | Dong Ta Ngao | ดงตะงาว | 9 | 2,034 |
