= Nong Saeng district, Saraburi =

Nong Saeng หนองแซง
- District
- District location in Saraburi province
- Coordinates: 14°29′32″N 100°47′4″E
- Country: Thailand
- Province: Saraburi

Area
  - Total: 87.081 km^{2} (33.622 sq mi)

Population (2019)
  - Total: 15,853
  - Density: 182.05/km^{2} (471.50/sq mi)
- Time zone: UTC+7 (ICT)
- Postal code: 18170
- Geocode: 1905

Nong Saeng (Thai: หนองแซง, pronounced [nɔ̌ːŋ sɛ̄ːŋ]) is a district (amphoe) of Saraburi province, central Thailand.

== History ==
Originally, the district was created as a minor district (king amphoe) under Sao Hai district in 1938. It was upgraded to a full district in 1953.

The most people of Nong Saeng migrated from Vientiane. They established their new town near a pond surrounded by saeng trees, so they named their new town Ban Nong Saeng.

== Geography ==
Neighboring districts are (from the north clockwise) Sao Hai, Mueang Saraburi, Nong Khae of Saraburi Province, and Phachi and Tha Ruea of Phra Nakhon Si Ayutthaya province.

== Administration ==
=== Central administration ===
The district Nong Saeng is subdivided into 9 subdistricts (Tambon), which are further subdivided into 69 administrative villages (Muban).

No.	Name	Thai	Villages	Pop.
1.	Nong Saeng	หนองแซง	8	2,072
2.	Nong Khwai So	หนองควายโซ	9	2,246
3.	Nong Hua Pho	หนองหัวโพ	7	1,774
4.	Nong Sida	หนองสีดา	6	963
5.	Nong Kop	หนองกบ	7	1,675
6.	Kai Sao	ไก่เส่า	10	2,409
7.	Khok Sa-at	โคกสะอาด	7	2,083
8.	Muang Wan	ม่วงหวาน	8	1,697
9.	Khao Din	เขาดิน	7	934

=== Local administration ===
There is one subdistrict municipality (Thesaban Tambon) in the district:

- Nong Saeng (Thai: เทศบาลตำบลหนองแซง) consisting of the complete subdistrict Nong Saeng and parts of the subdistricts Nong Khwai So, Kai Sao.

There are 5 subdistrict administrative organizations (SAO) in the district:

- Nong Hua Pho (Thai: องค์การบริหารส่วนตำบลหนองหัวโพ) consisting of the complete subdistrict Nong Hua Pho, Nong Sida.
- Nong Kop (Thai: องค์การบริหารส่วนตำบลหนองกบ) consisting of the complete subdistrict Nong Kop and parts of the subdistrict Nong Khwai So.
- Kai Sao (Thai: องค์การบริหารส่วนตำบลไก่เส่า) consisting of parts of the subdistrict Kai Sao.
- Khok Sa-at (Thai: องค์การบริหารส่วนตำบลโคกสะอาด) consisting of the complete subdistrict Khok Sa-at.
- Muang Wan (Thai: องค์การบริหารส่วนตำบลม่วงหวาน) consisting of the complete subdistrict Muang Wan, Khao Din.
