= Buddha footprint =

Monument marking or symbolizing an imprint of Gautama Buddha's foot or both feet

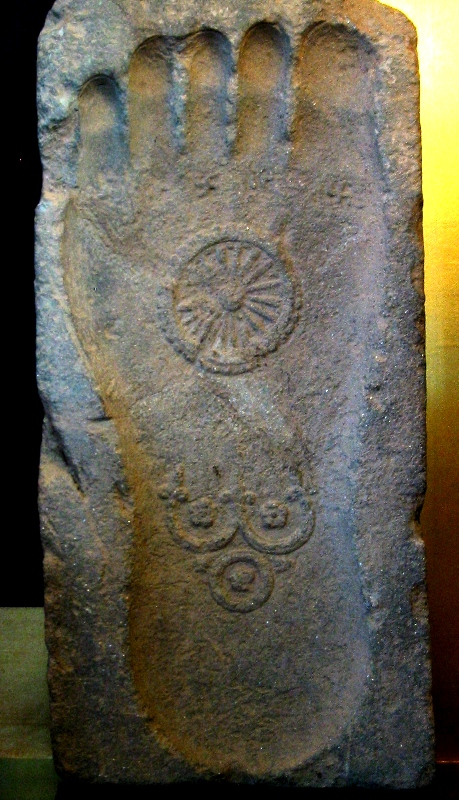
Footprint of Buddha with Dharmacakra and Triratna, 1st century, Gandhāra

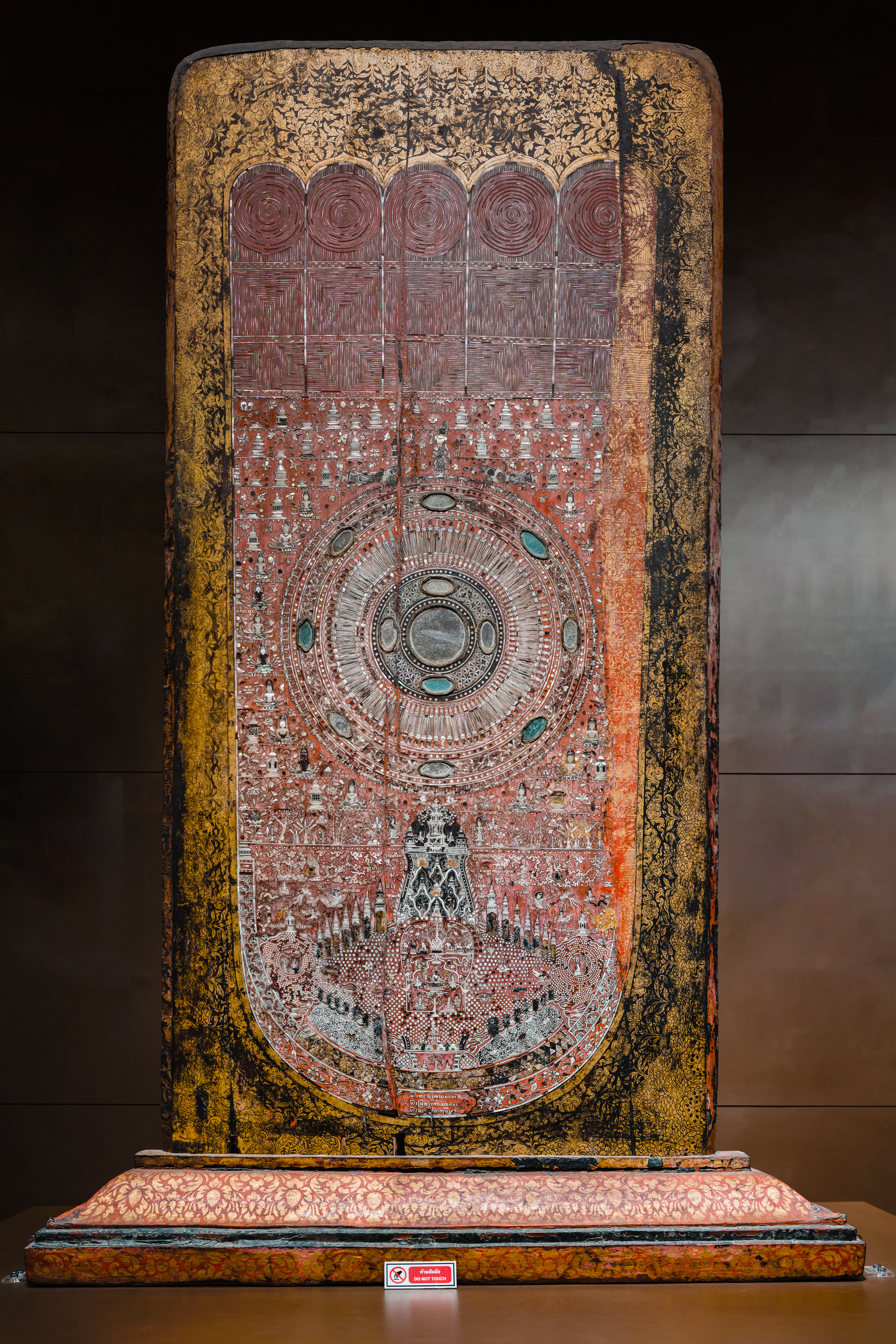
Buddhapada, Teak wood decorated with mother of pearl and glass. Lanna art, late 15th – early 16th centuries. Wat Phra Singh Woramahaviharn

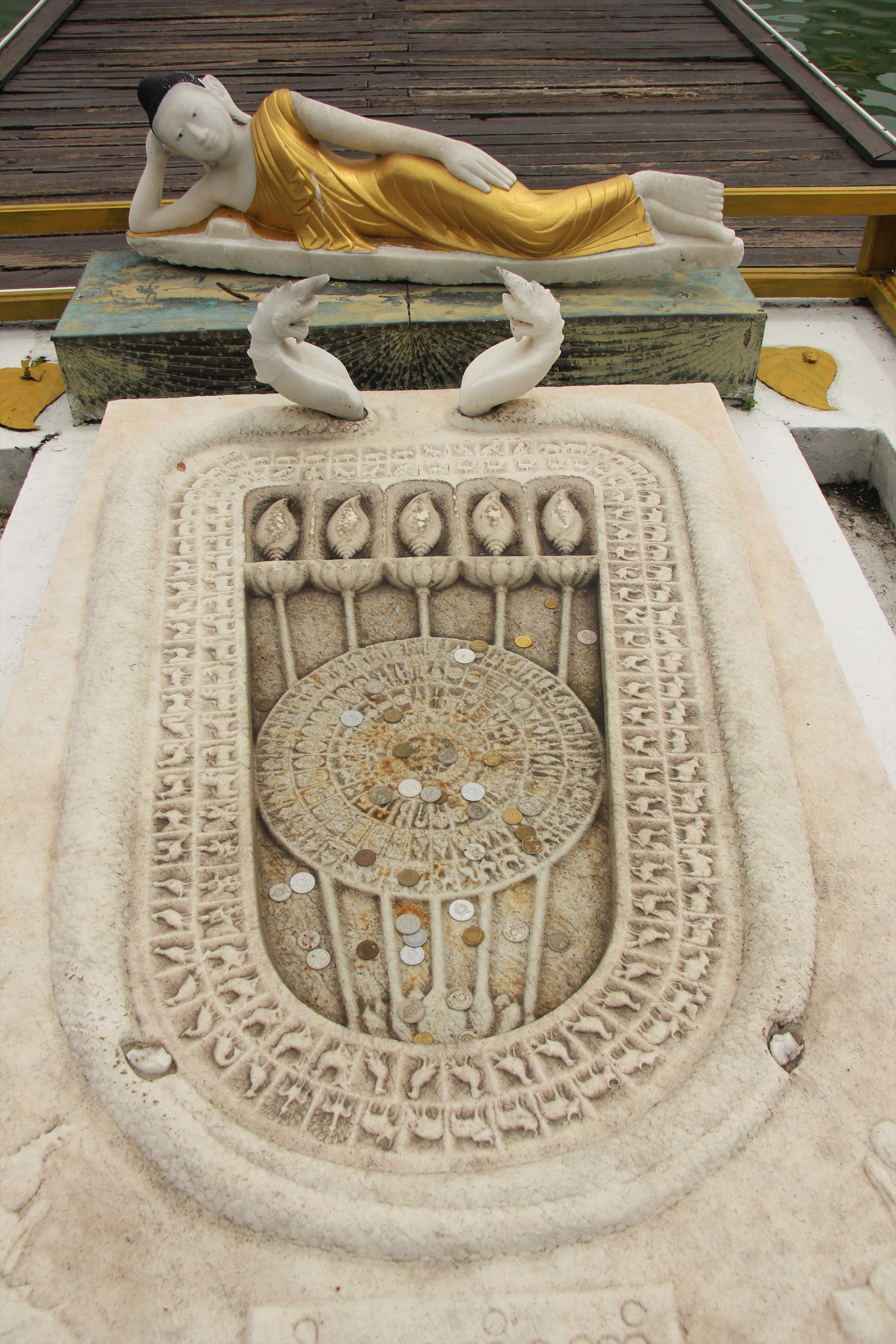
Buddha footprint at entrance of the Seema Malaka temple

Buddha's footprints (Sanskrit: Buddhapada)( Tibetan: སངས་རྒྱས་ཀྱི་ཞབས་རྗེས། ) is an important Buddhist symbol which is commonly depicted as icons shaped like an imprint of Gautama Buddha's foot or both feet. There are two forms: natural, as found in stone or rock, and those made artificially. Many of the "natural" ones are acknowledged not to be genuine footprints of the Buddha, but rather replicas or representations of them, which can be considered cetiya (Buddhist relics) and also an early aniconic and symbolic representation of the Buddha.

== Symbolism ==
Footprints of the Buddha abound throughout Asia, dating from various periods. Japanese author Motoji Niwa (丹羽基二, Niwa Motoji), who spent years tracking down the footprints in many Asian countries, estimates that he found more than 3,000 such footprints, among them about 300 in Japan and more than 1,000 in Sri Lanka. They often bear distinguishing marks, such as a Dharmachakra at the centre of the sole, or the 32, 108 or 132 auspicious signs of the Buddha, engraved or painted on the sole.

A depression atop Sri padaya in Sri Lanka is among the largest and most famous footprints. Buddhist legend holds that during his lifetime the Buddha flew to Sri Lanka and left his footprint on Sri padaya to indicate the importance of Sri Lanka as the perpetuator of his teachings, and also left footprints in all lands where his teachings would be acknowledged. In Thailand, the most important of these "natural" footprints embedded in rock is at Phra Phutthabat in central Thailand. In China, during the Tang dynasty, the discovery of a large footprint of the Buddha in Chengzhou caused Empress Wu Zetian to inaugurate a new reign name in that year, 701 CE, starting the Dazu (Big Foot) era.

The footprint as a sculptural object has a long history stemming from the first examples made in India. These were made during the pre-Greco-Buddhist phase of Buddhist art at Sanchi, Bharhut, and other places in India, along with the Bo-Tree and the Dharmachakra. Later, the footprint-making tradition became prominent in Sri Lanka, Cambodia, Burma, and Thailand.

== History ==
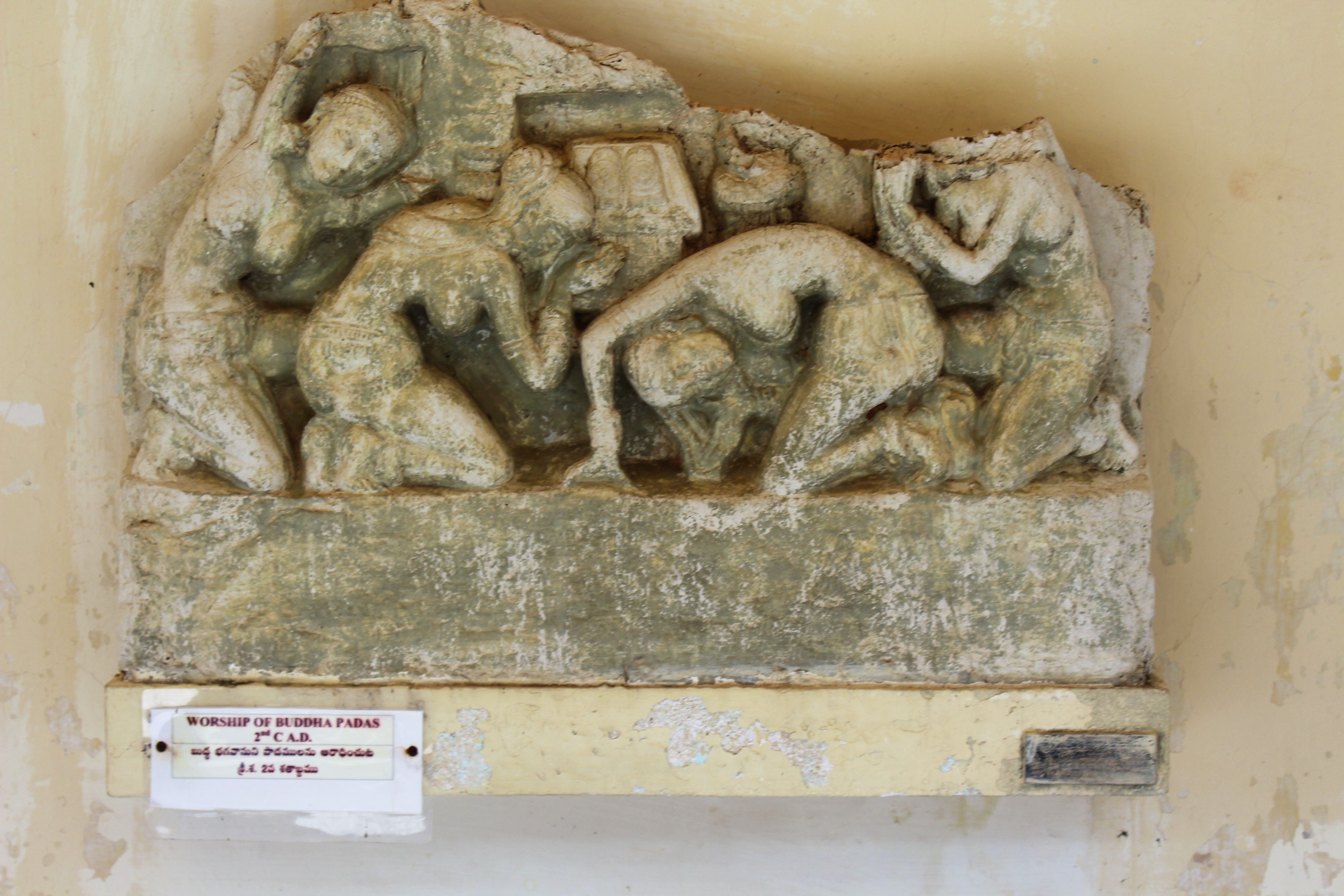
A stone depiction of ancient worship of Buddhapada

The veneration of the feet of gurus or deities was commonplace in ancient India, placing one's head at or under their feet being a ritual gesture signifying a hierarchy. As cetiya, the Buddha's footprint was classified in a variety of ways. Some were uddesika, representational relics, and others were paribhogika, relics of use or of contact, and occasionally saririka, as though they were not just footprints but the Buddha's actual feet. Some of the depictions of the footprints may signify events in the life of the Buddha, but others may have been depictions of people worshipping at footprint shrines.

To clarify: a footprint of the Buddha is a concave image of his foot (or feet), supposed to have been left by him on earth to purposefully mark his passage over a particular spot. The images of the Buddha's feet are convex images which represent the actual soles of his feet, with all their characteristics. Following the traditional triple division of the cetiya, we can assume that the first form of the image of the Buddha's feet – the concave one – is a sort of pāribhogika element, since it is indissolubly connected with the Tathāgata himself. The second one can be thought as an uddissaka element, since it was created by a devoted artist (or artists) to commemorate the Buddha, taking as its model a genuine footprint. But we can think of this second group, too, as a "pāribhogika by supposition", as noted by Chutiwongs. According to French scholar Paul Mus, the footprints were the type of magical objects which "enables one to act at a distance on people related to it."

== See also ==
- Petrosomatoglyph
