= Tha Ruea railway station =

Railway station in Thailand

Coordinates: 14.5624°N 100.7243°E

Tha Ruea ท่าเรือ
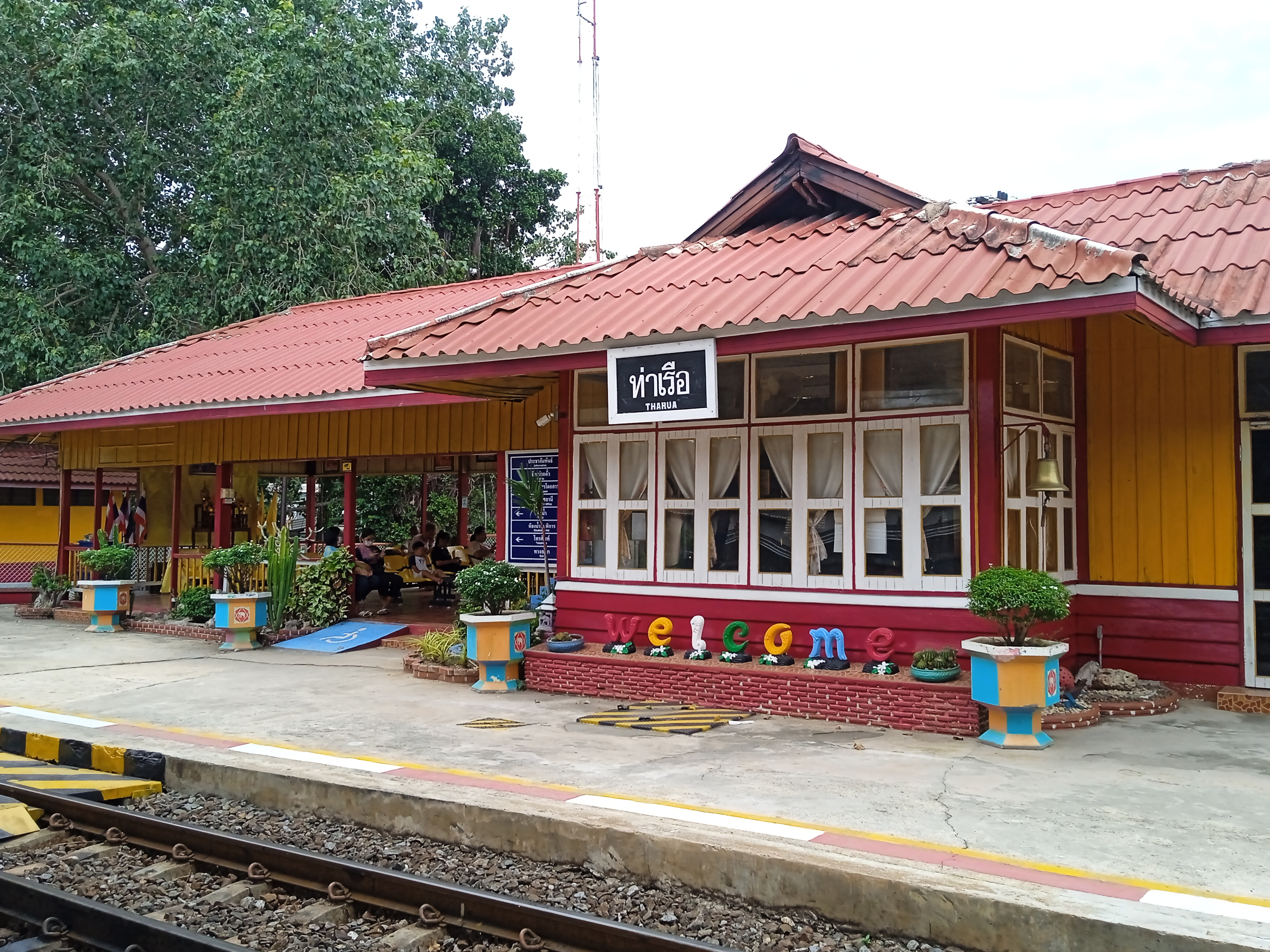

General information
- Location: Thesaban 2 Road, Tha Ruea Subdistrict, Tha Ruea District, Phra Nakhon Si Ayutthaya
- Owner: State Railway of Thailand
- Line: Northern Line
- Platforms: 3
- Tracks: 3

Other information
- Station code: ทร.

Services
Preceding station	State Railway of Thailand	Following station
Ban Plak Raet Halt towards Hua Lamphong or Krung Thep Aphiwat	Northern Line	Ban Mo towards Chiang Mai
Location

Tha Ruea railway station is a railway station located in the Tha Ruea Subdistrict, Tha Ruea District, Phra Nakhon Si Ayutthaya. It is a class 1 railway station located 102.735 km (63.8 mi) from Bangkok railway station.

In the past, Tha Ruea railway station was famous for the Thai dessert Khanom babin, but nowadays it is no longer sold on the premises.

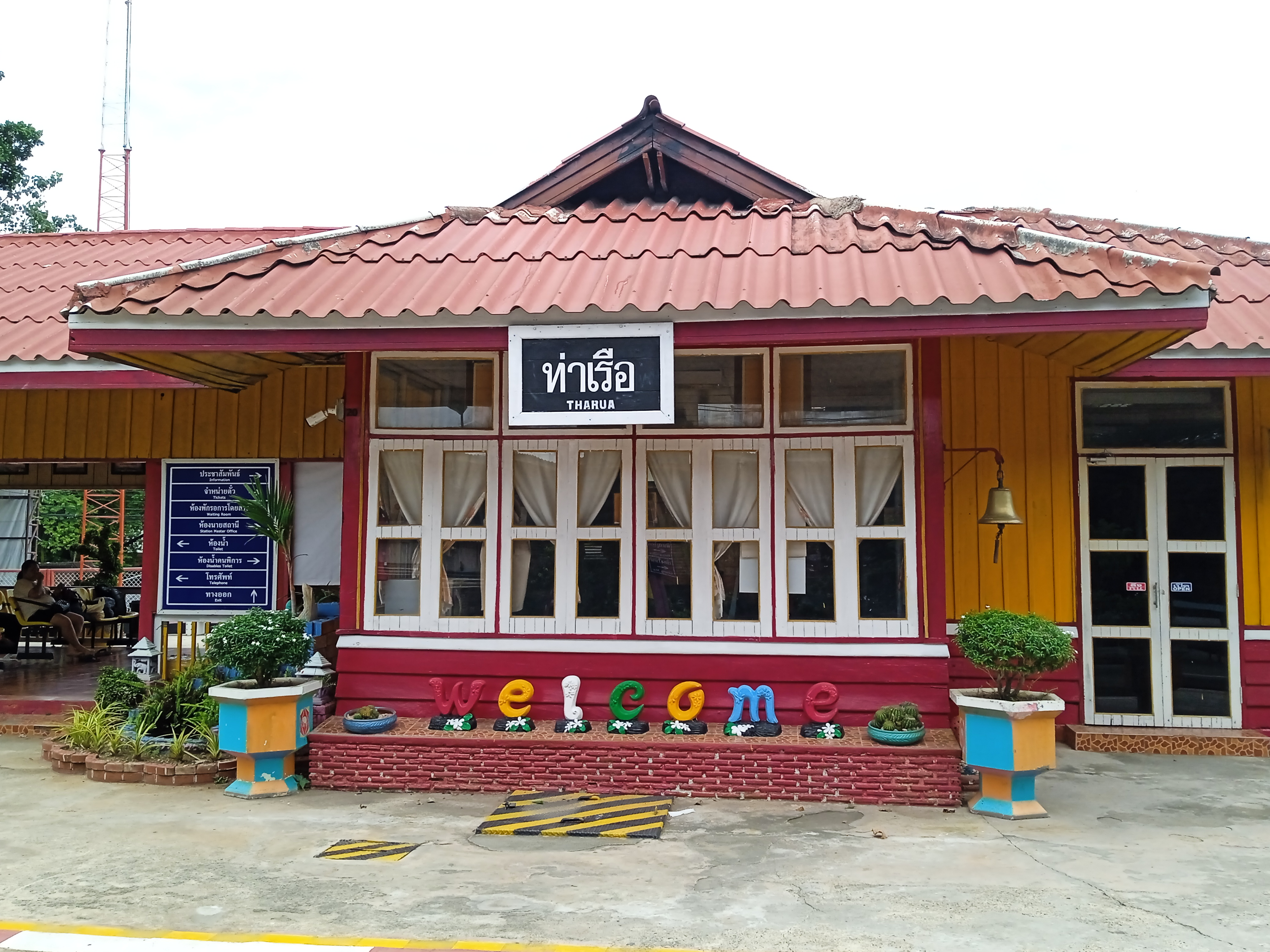

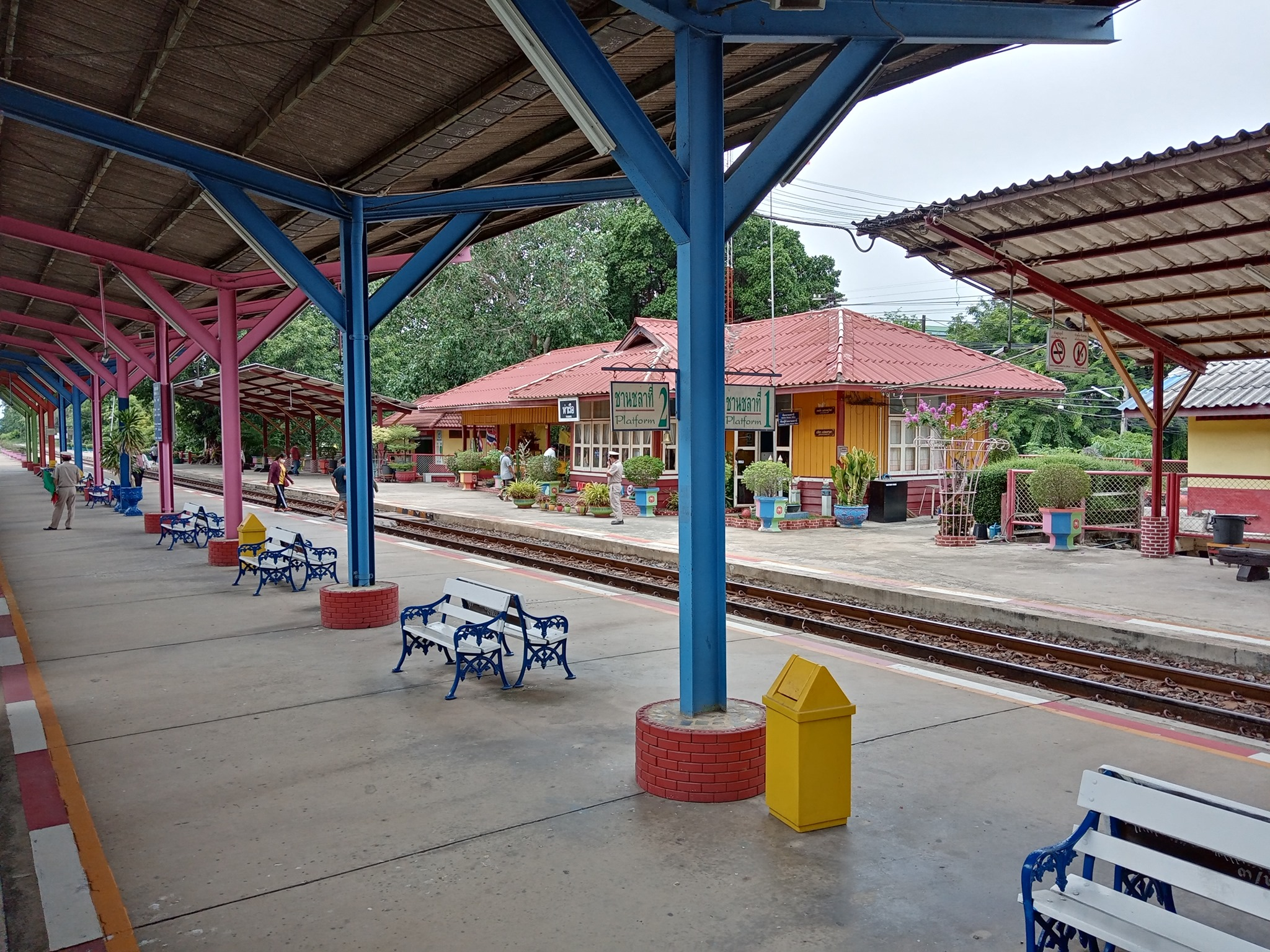

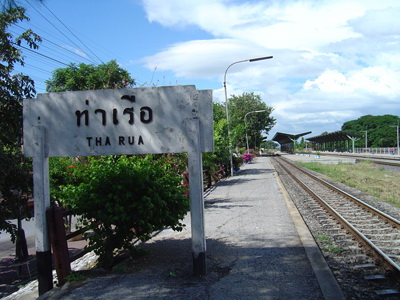
