= Wat Phra Phutthabat =

Thai Buddhist Temple built during Ayutthaya period

- วัดพระพุทธบาท
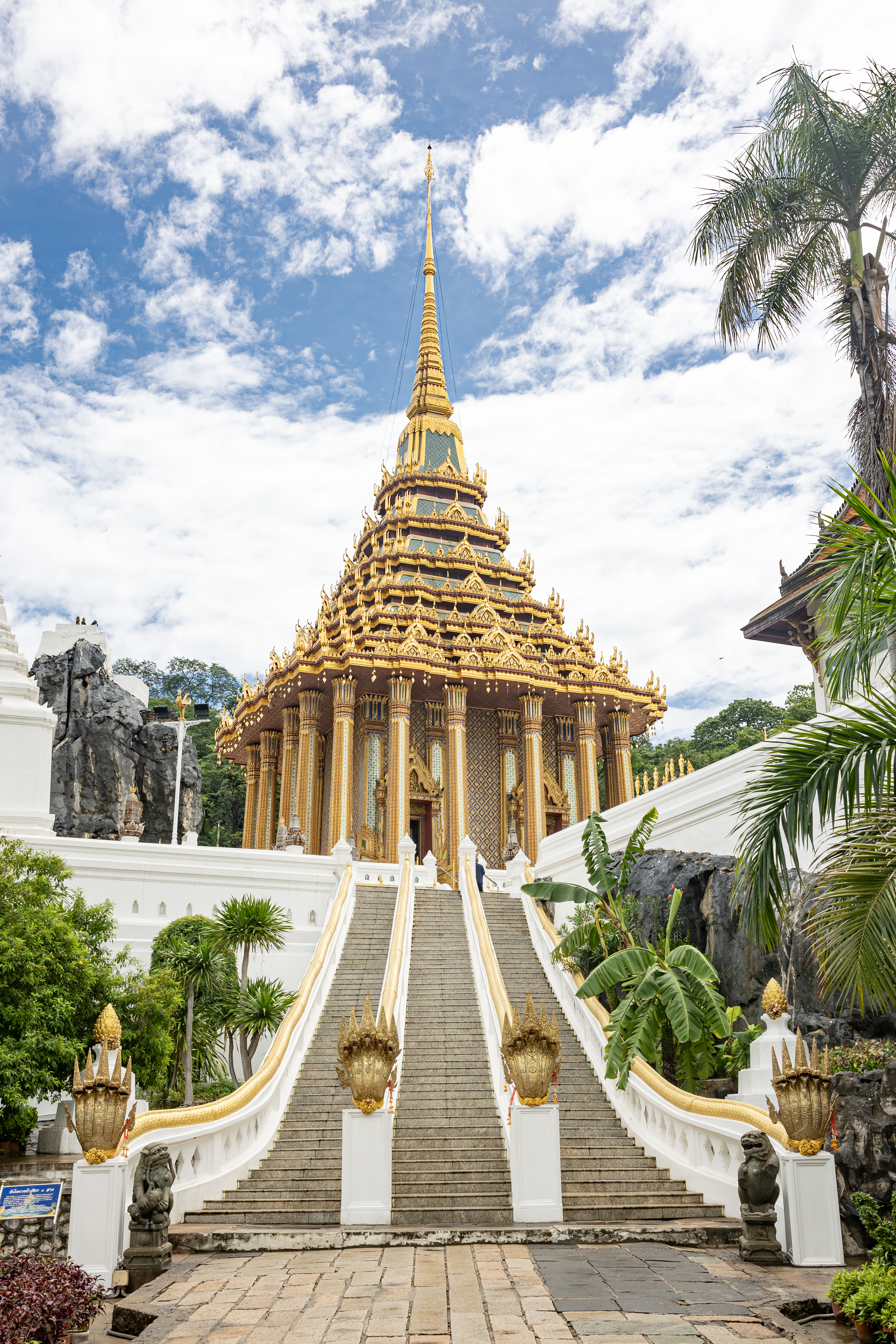
- Wat Phra Phutthabat: the mondop with the footprint

- Location within Thailand

Religion
- Affiliation: Buddhist
- Status: functional

Location
- Location: Saraburi
- Country: Thailand
- Interactive map of Wat Phra Phutthabat
- Coordinates: 14.7183°N 100.7886°E

Architecture
- Completed: 1624

Wat Phra Phutthabat (Thai: วัดพระพุทธบาท) is a Buddhist temple in Saraburi, Thailand. Its name means "temple of Buddha's footprint", because it contains a natural depression believed to be a footprint of the Buddha.

== History ==
Phra Phutthabat temple was built in 1624 (B.E. 2168) by King Songtham of Ayutthaya, after a hunter named Phran Bun found a large depression in the stone, resembling a huge footprint, near Suwan Banpot Hill or Satchaphanthakhiri Hill. The hunter reported his find to the king, who ordered workers to build a temporary mondop to cover the footprint; this later became the temple.

== Belief ==
The Bunnoowaat sutra tells of the flight of the Buddha to the peak of Mount Suwanbanphot, and of how he left his footprints. It is believed there are five footprints of the Buddha in different places including Phra Phutthabat temple. Some believe that worshiping the footprints, sprinkling water, or placing gold leaf on them will lead to the forgiveness of sin, success in life, or eternal happiness.

== Geography ==
Phra Phutthabat temple is built in the mountains, mostly surrounded by forest. It is in Phra Phutthabat District, 28 kilometres from Saraburi City.

== Festival ==
There are two main festivals held annually at Phra Phutthabat Temple:

Holy Footprint Festival – This festival is held twice a year, usually in February and March. During the event, large numbers of Buddhist devotees and tourists visit the temple to pay homage to the Buddha's footprint and take part in various religious activities at the temple entrance.

Tak Bat Dok Mai Ceremony – The Tak Bat Dok Mai Ceremony is regarded as the principal traditional event in Phra Phutthabat District. It is held at the beginning of the annual three-month Buddhist Lent. During the ceremony, people offer alms to monks and present candles for the Buddhist Lent at Phra Phutthabat Temple. In the evening, participants also offer white or yellow flowers to the monks.

== Sacred Footprint ==
The size of the footprint is about 53 cm (21 inches) wide, 152 cm (five feet) long, and 28 cm (11 inches) deep. The footprint is covered by a decorated golden case. Inside the case the footprint is covered with layers of gold leaf, coins and banknotes thrown by worshipers and visitors.

== Gallery ==
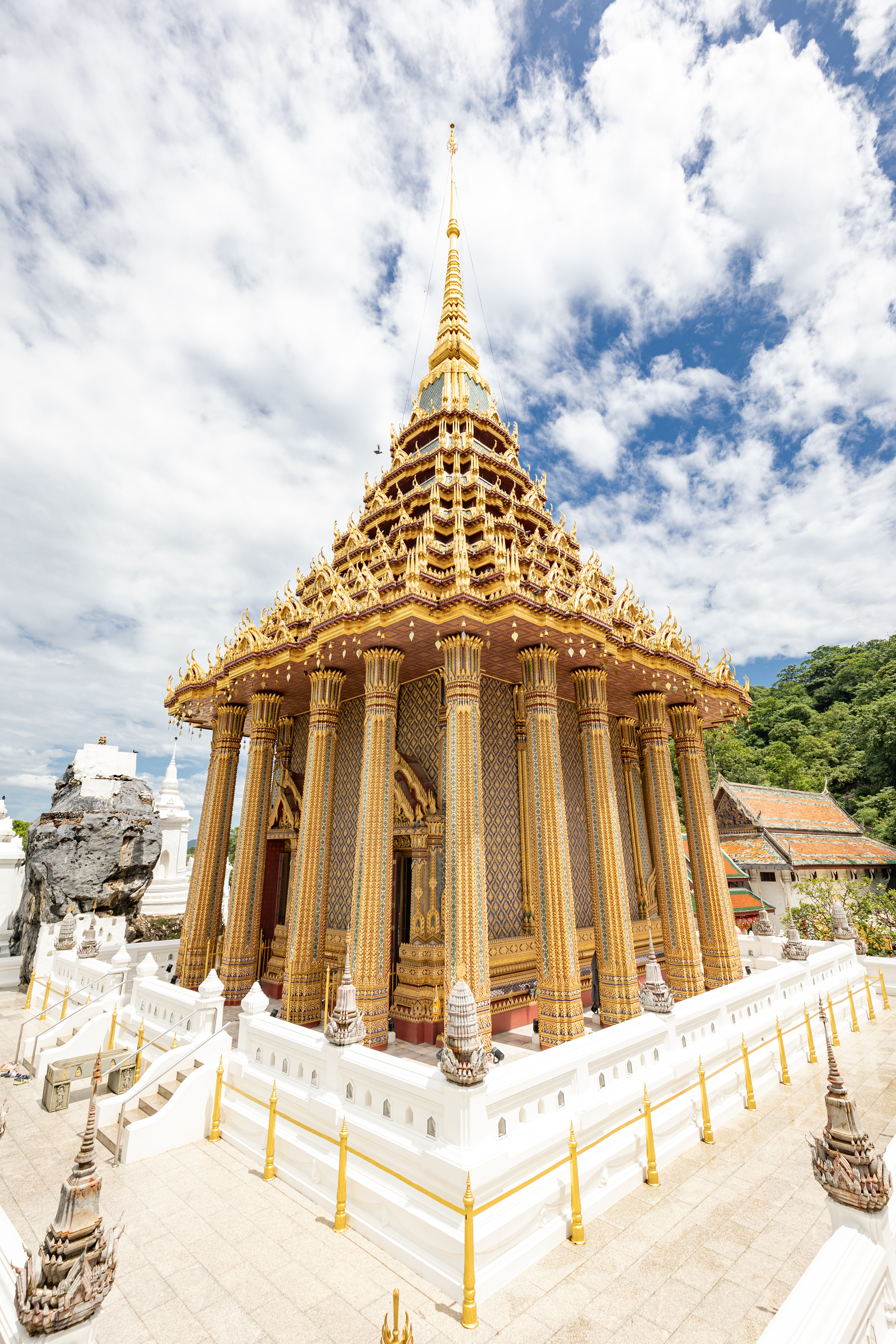
Mondop (footprint shrine)

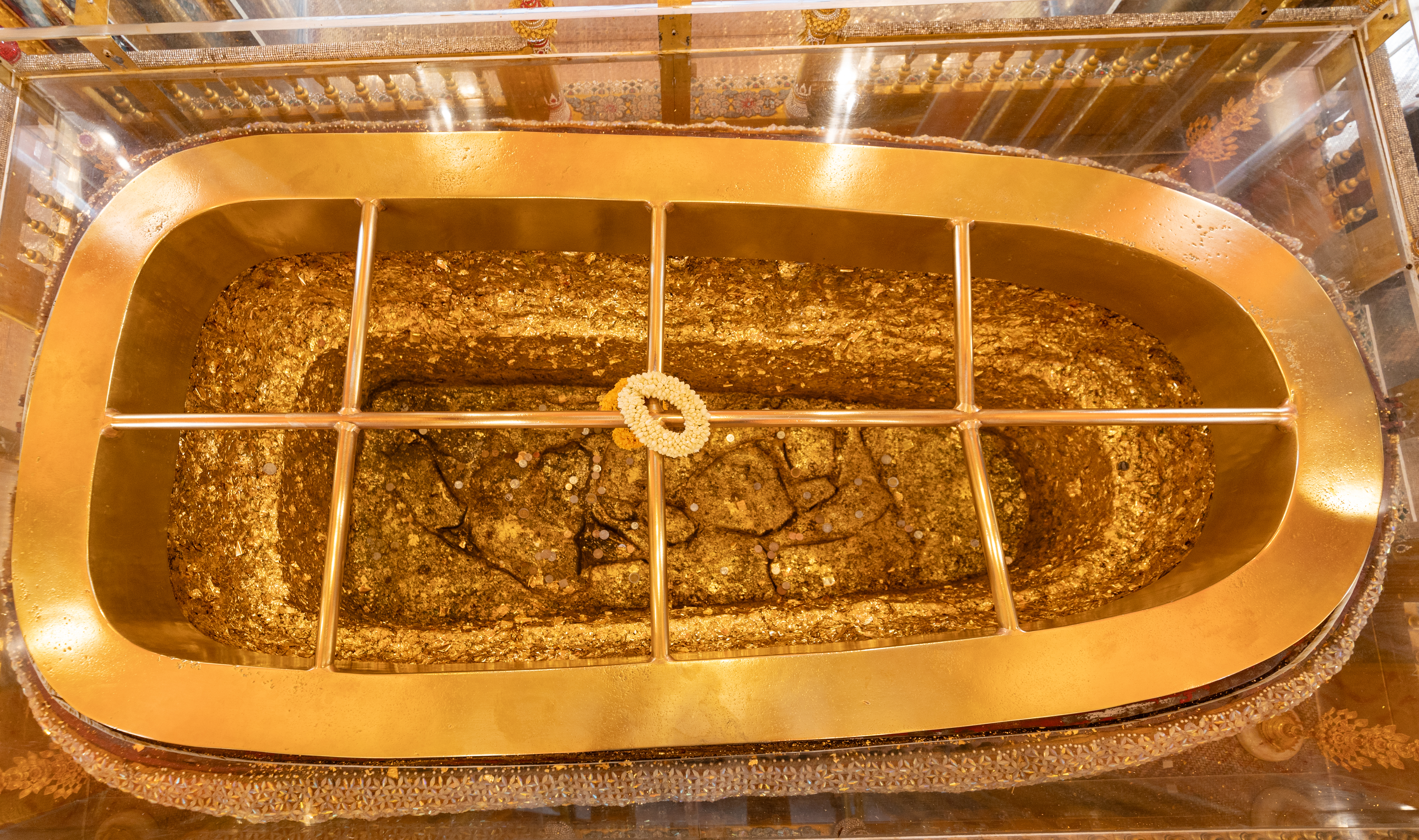
Buddha's footprint

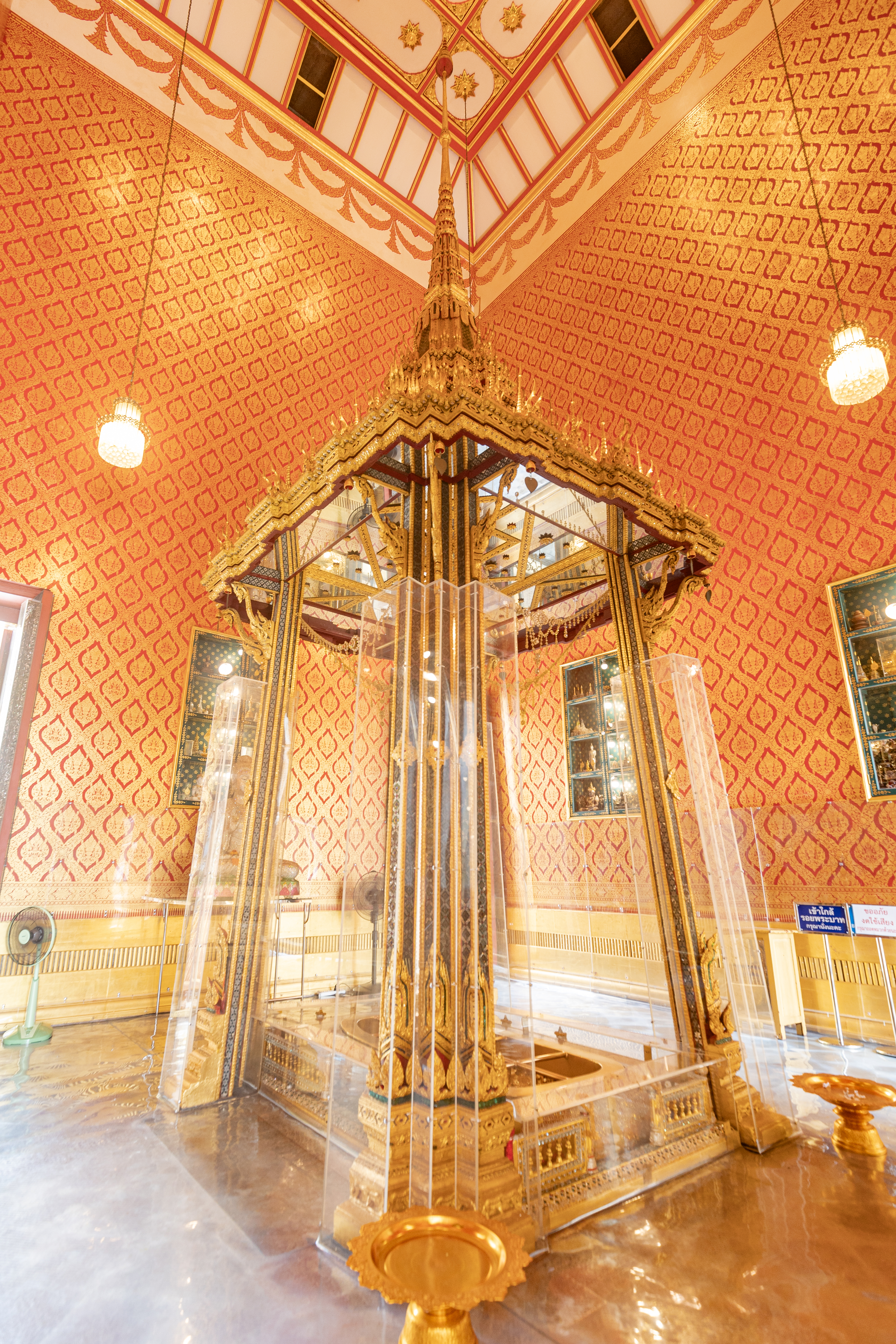
Footprint shrine (busabok) covering the Buddha's footprint inside the mondop

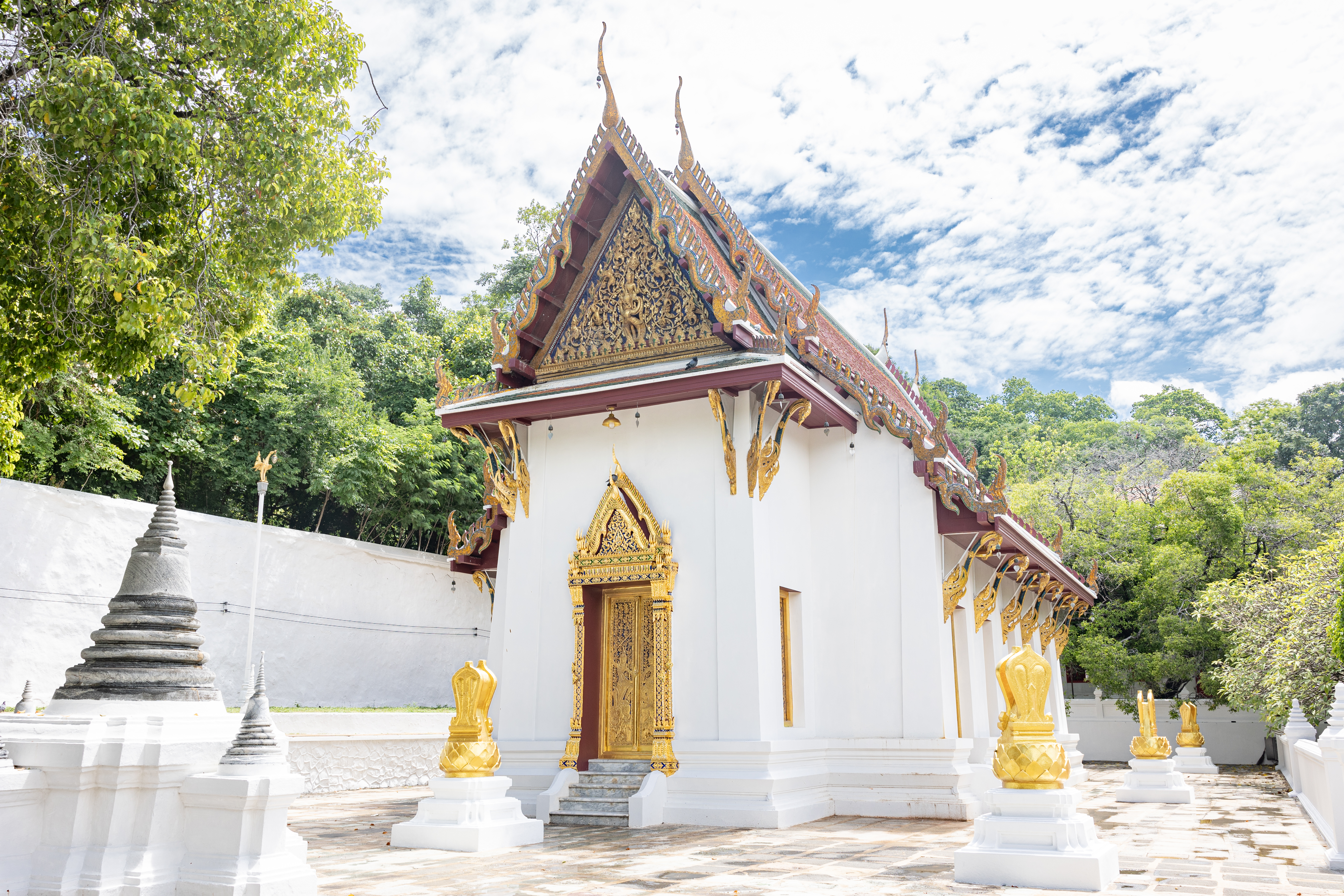
Ordination hall (ubosot)

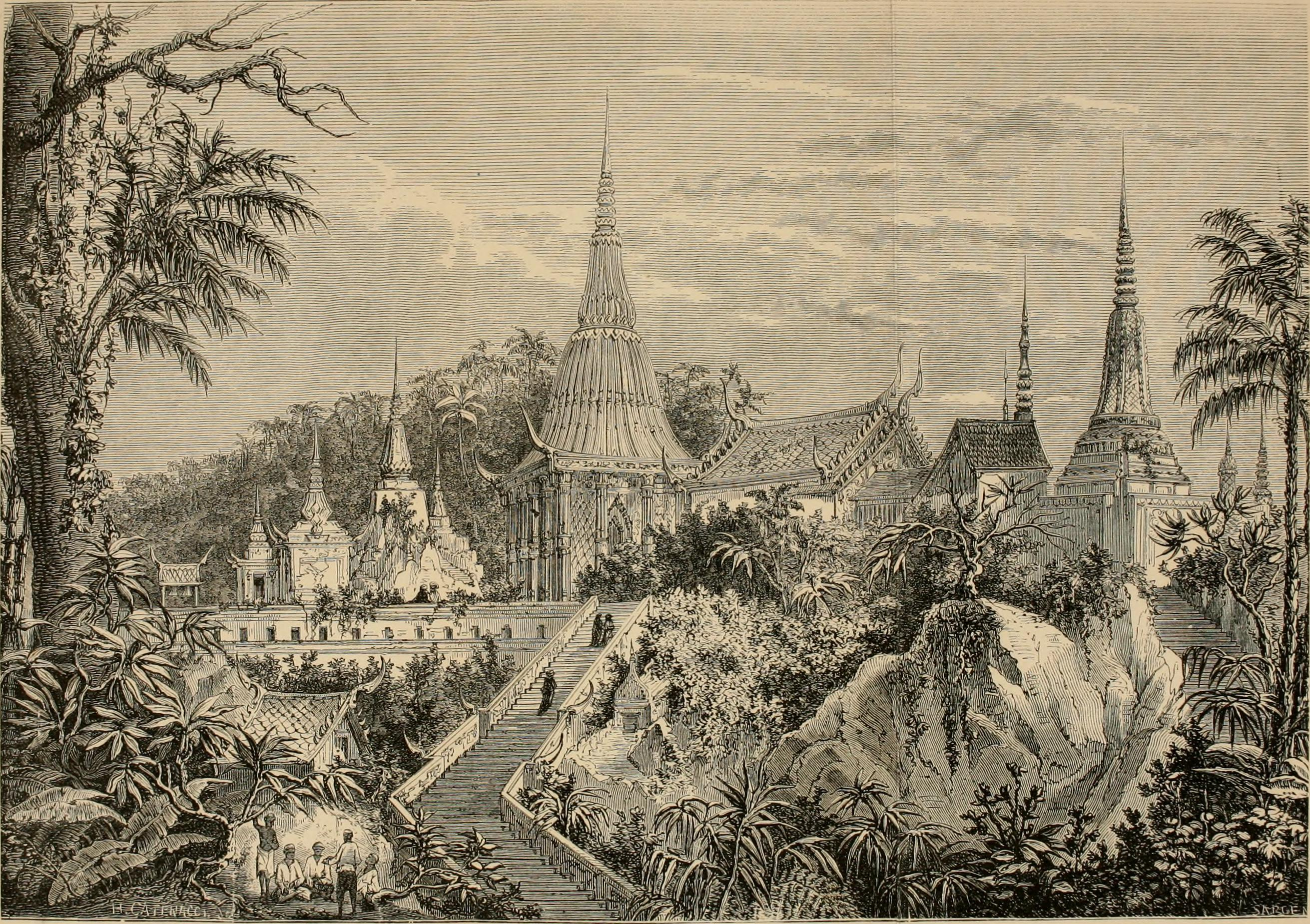
Wat Phra Phutthabat in the reign of King Mongkut (Rama IV), drawing by Henri Mouhot
