= Saraburi province =

Province of Thailand

Coordinates: 14°31′42″N 100°54′35″E

Saraburi สระบุรี
- Province
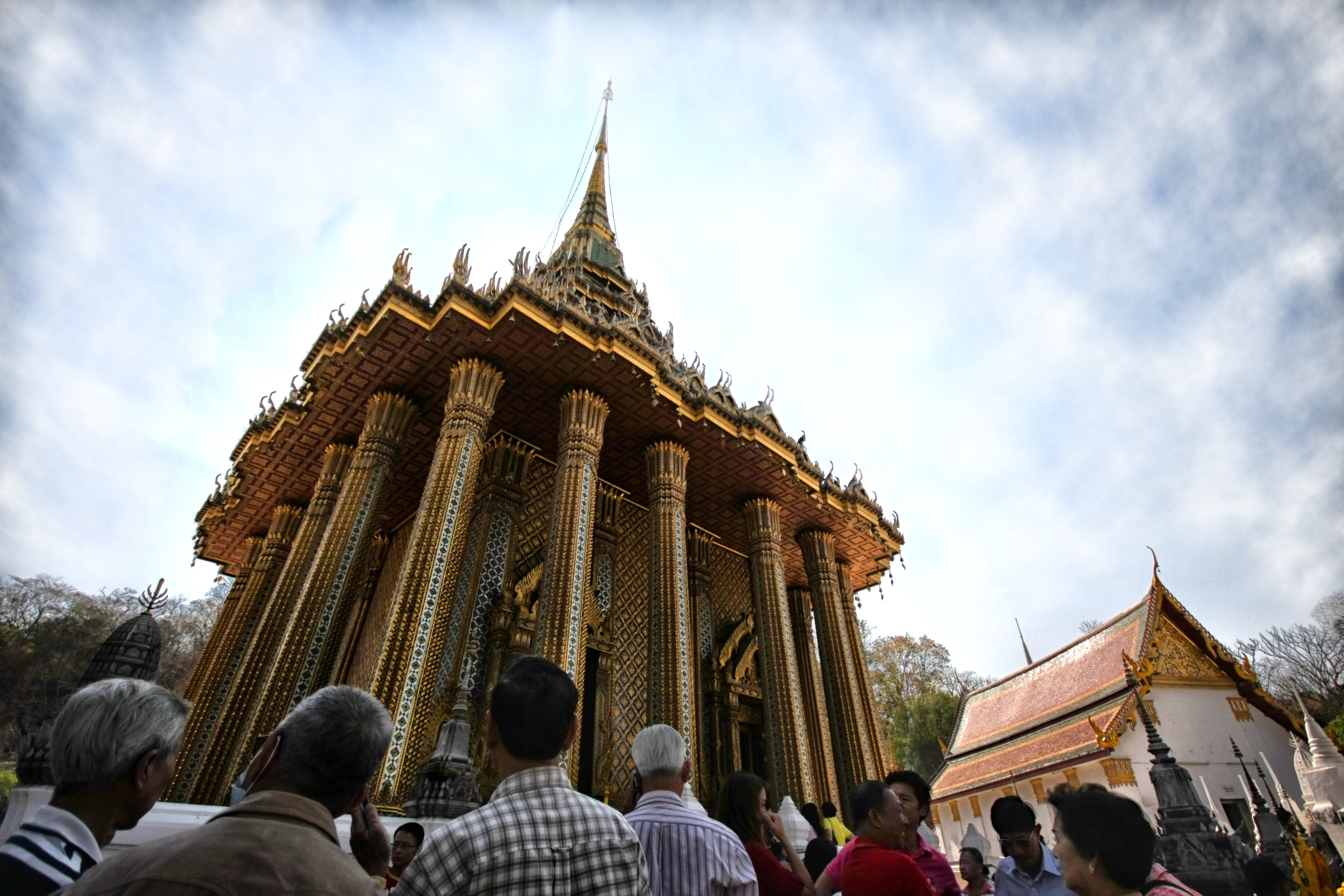
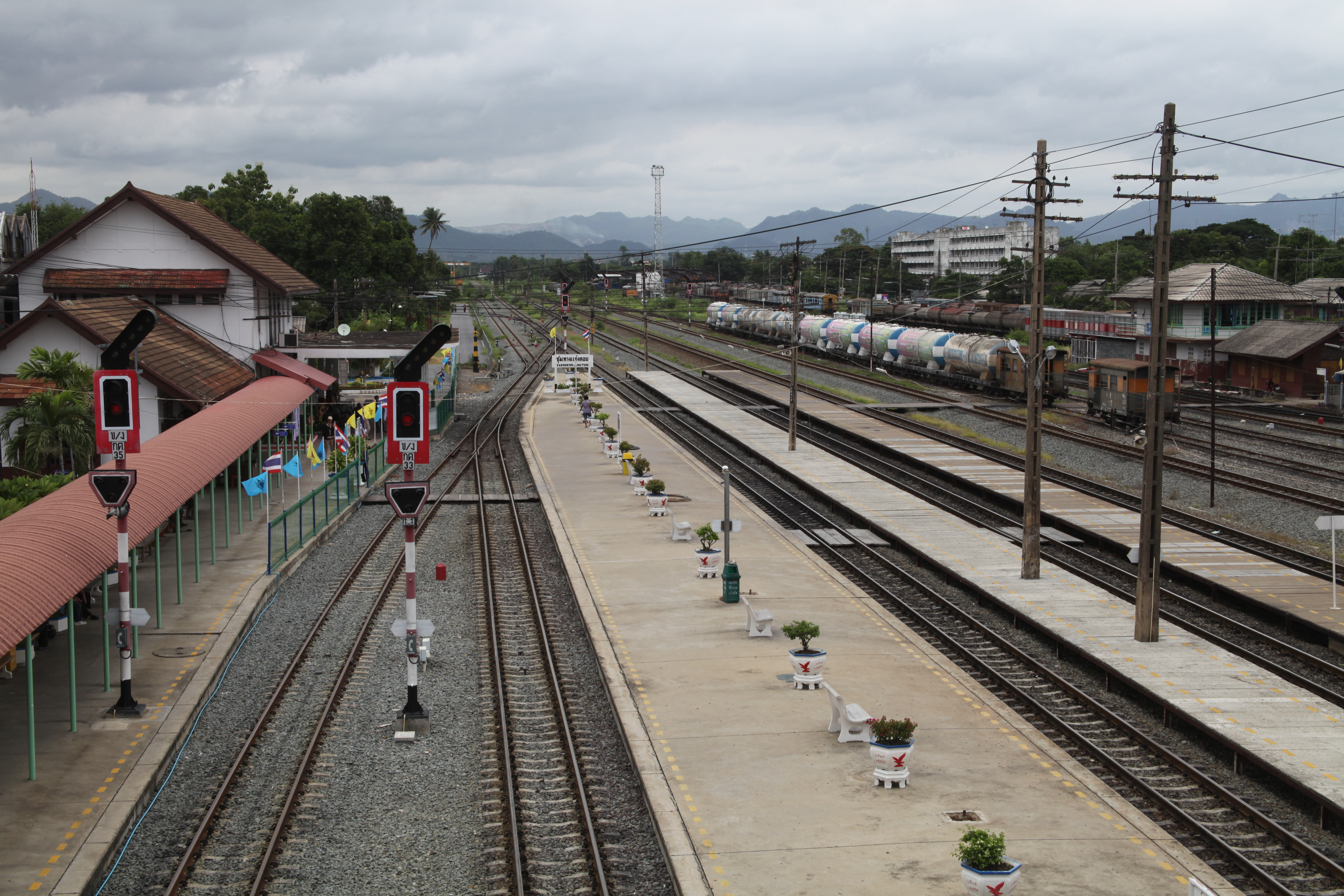
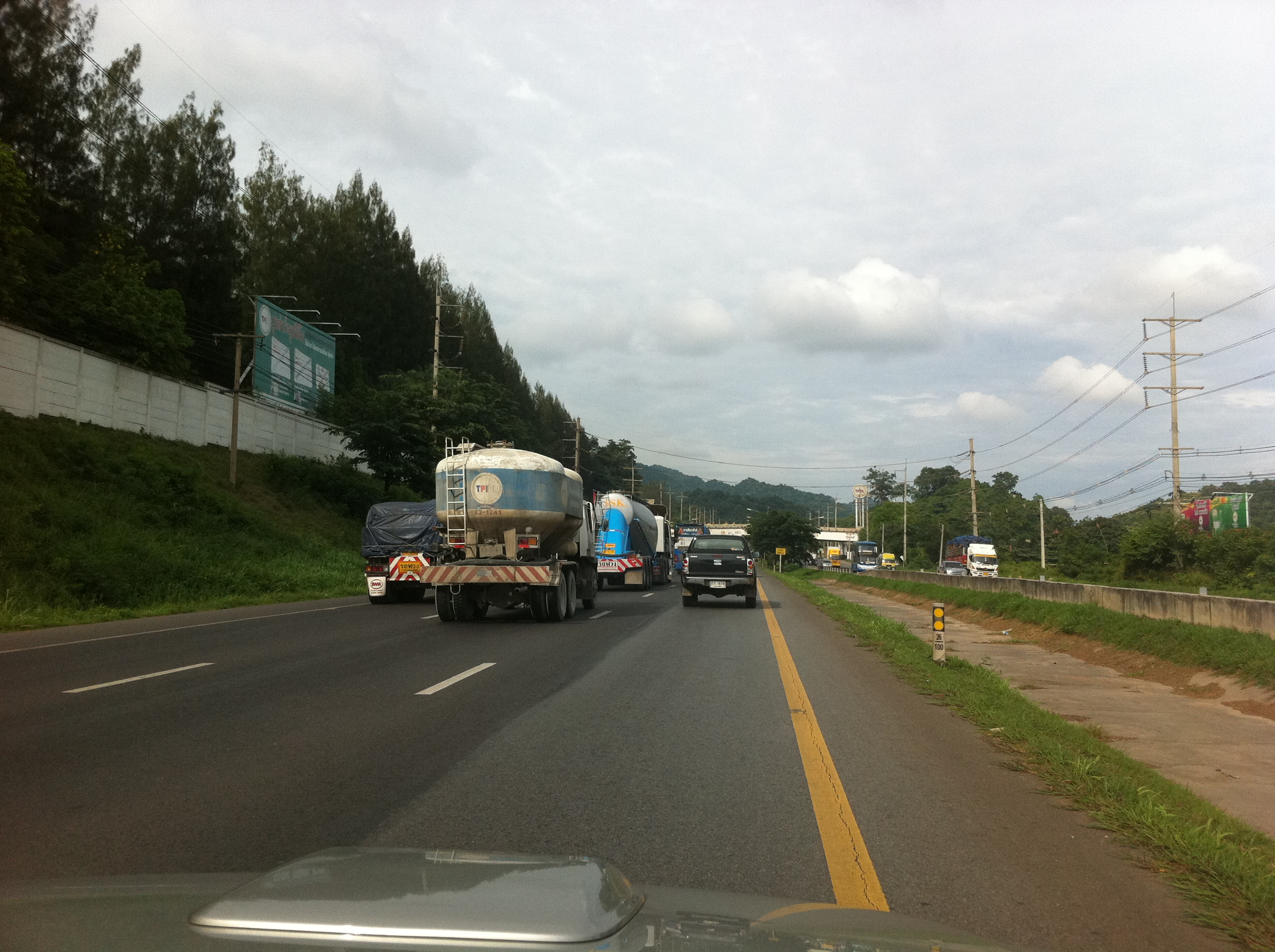
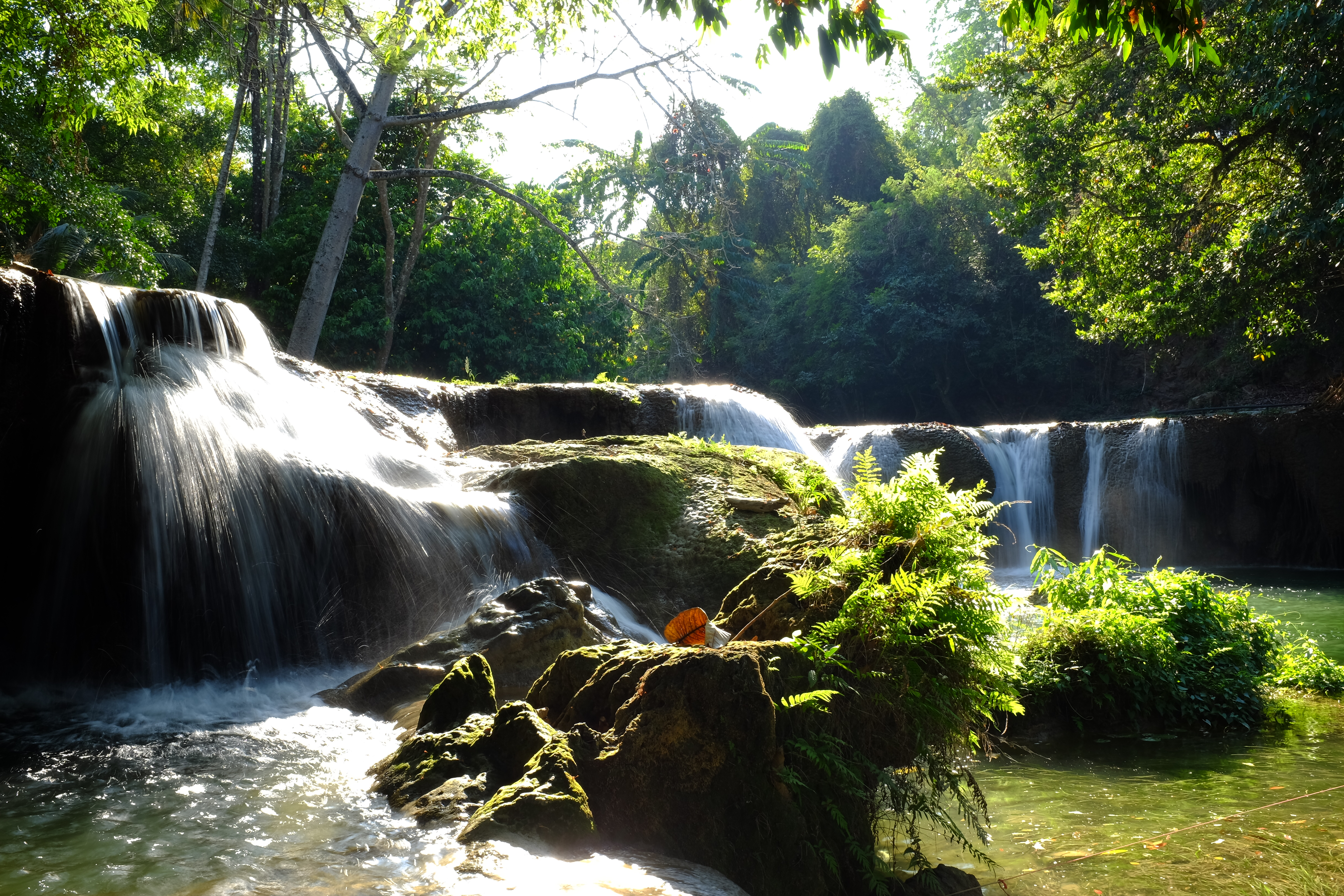
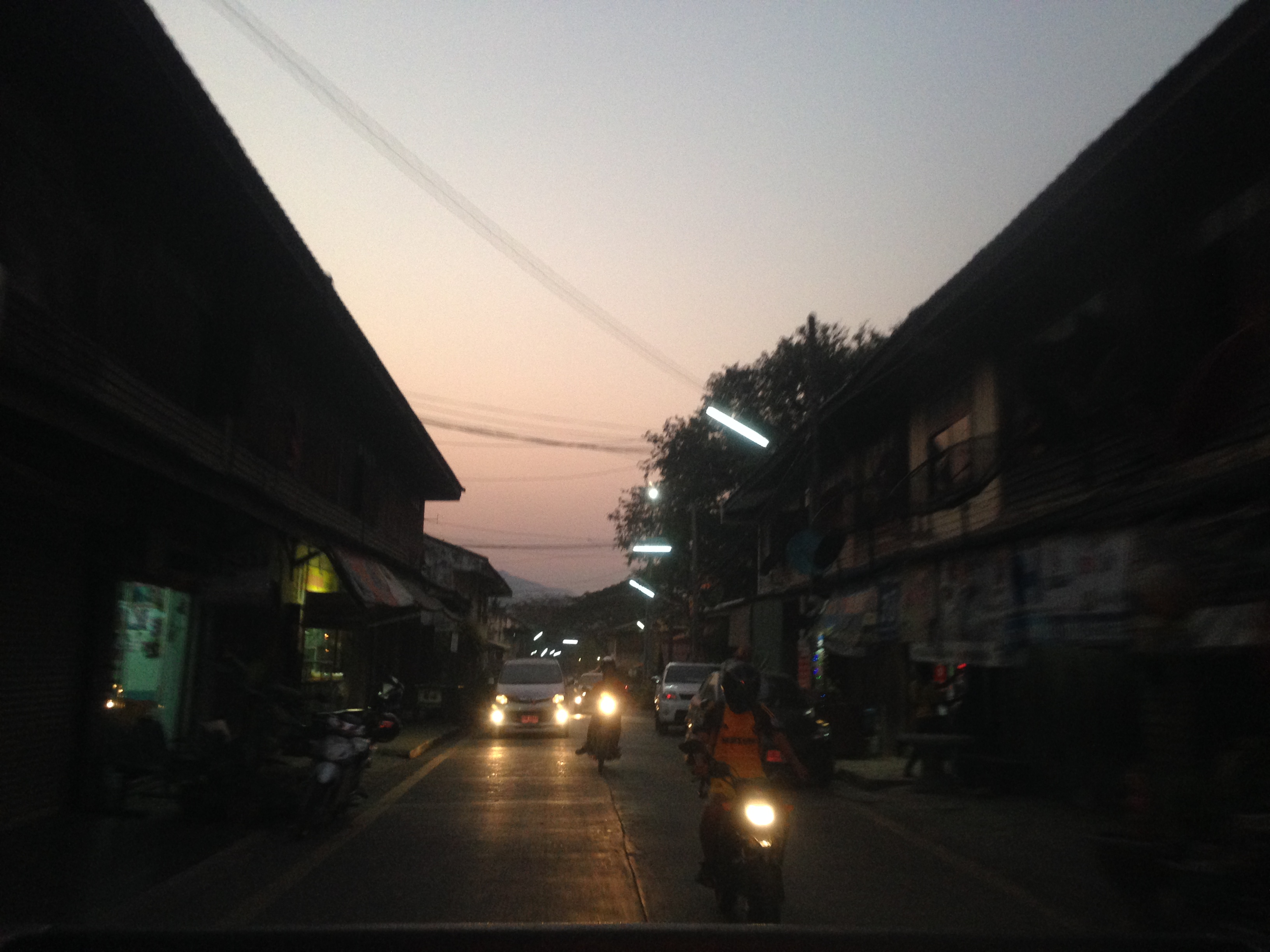
- Wat Phra Phutthabat, the provincial symbol Kaeng Khoi Junction railway station, the main railway station of the province Mittraphap Road (Highway 2) in the area of Muak Lek Chet Sao Noi Waterfalls Muak Lek old town

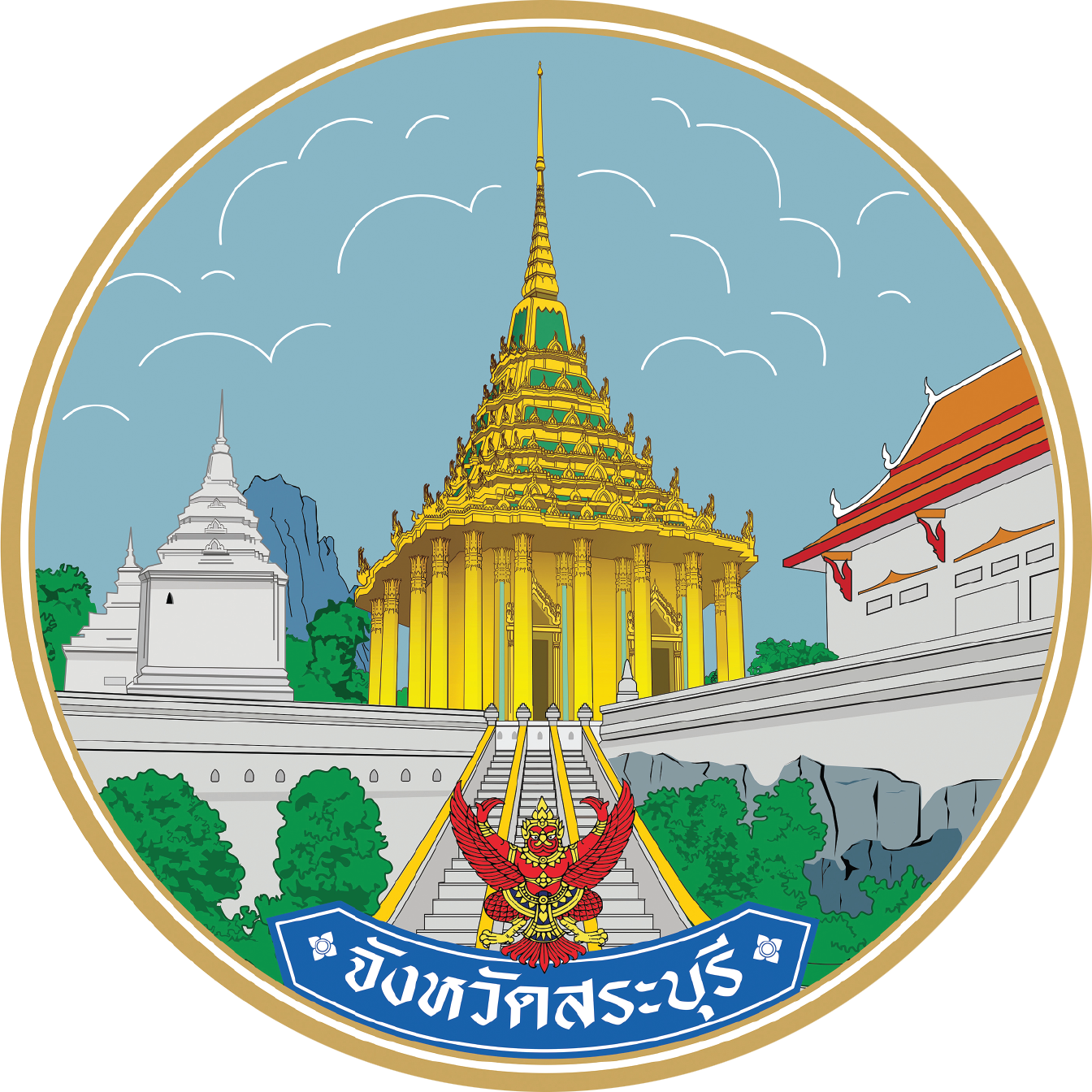
- Flag Seal
- Mottoes: พระพุทธบาทสูงค่า เขื่อนป่าสักชลสิทธิ์ ฐานผลิตอุตสาหกรรม เกษตรนำล้ำแหล่งเที่ยว หนึ่งเดียวกะหรี่ปั๊บนมดี ประเพณีตักบาตรดอกไม้งาม เหลืองอร่ามทุ่งทานตะวัน ลือลั่นเมืองชุมทาง ("Precious Buddha's footprint. Pa Sak Jolasid Dam. Base of industrial production. Agricultural tourism. The only curry puffs and good milk. Flower alms giving festival. Bright yellow sunflower fields. The famed junction city.")
- Map of Thailand highlighting Saraburi province
- Country: Thailand
- Capital: Saraburi

Government
  - Governor: Bancha Chaowarin

Area
  - Total: 3,499 km^{2} (1,351 sq mi)
  - Rank: 58th

Population (2024)
  - Total: ▼639,165
  - Rank: 40th
  - Density: 182/km^{2} (470/sq mi)
  - Rank: 17th

Human Achievement Index
  - HAI (2022): 0.6360 "average" Ranked 45th

GDP
  - Total: baht 237 billion (US$8.0 billion) (2019)
- Time zone: UTC+7 (ICT)
- Postal code: 18xxx
- Calling code: 036
- ISO 3166 code: TH-19
- Website: saraburi.go.th

Saraburi Provincial Administrative Organization องค์การบริหารส่วนจังหวัดสระบุรี
- Provincial Administrative Organization
- Interactive map of Saraburi Provincial Administrative Organization

Government
  - Type: Local administrative divisions
  - Body: Saraburi Provincial Administrative Organization
  - President: Sanya Boon-Long
- Website: saraburipao.go.th

Saraburi (Thai: สระบุรี) is one of the central provinces (changwat) of Thailand. Neighboring provinces are (from north clockwise) Lopburi, Nakhon Ratchasima, Nakhon Nayok, Pathum Thani, and Ayutthaya. It is believed to have been constructed in the year 1548 during the reign of King Maha Chakkraphat of Ayutthaya as a centre for recruiting troops.

== Geography ==
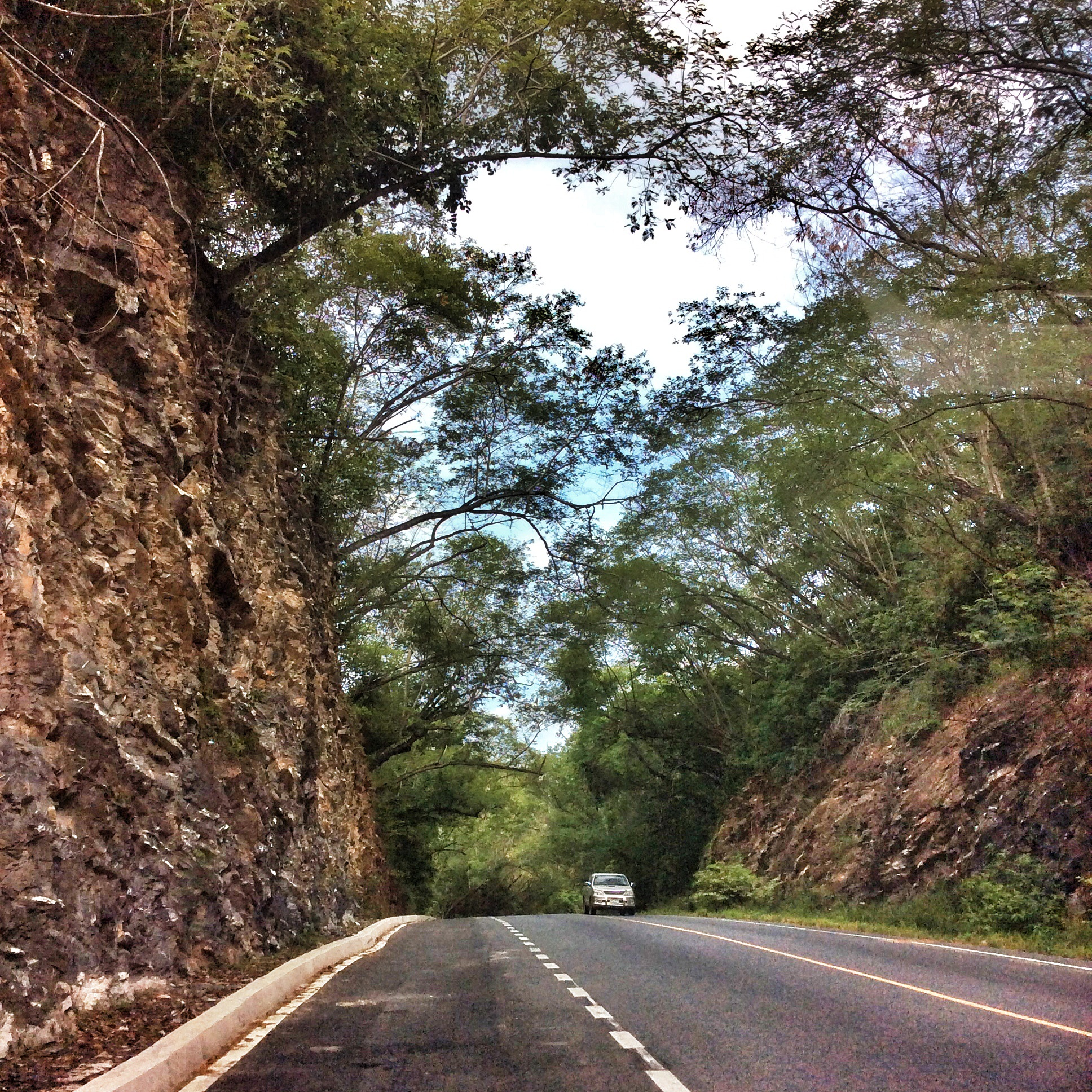
Tree tunnel on Highway 2089 near Chet Sao Noi Waterfall

Saraburi is on the east side of the Chao Phraya River valley. The eastern part of the province is covered by high plains and plateaus, while the western part is mostly low flat plains. Saraburi province has 848 km^{2} (327 sq mi) of forest or 24.2 percent of provincial area. The town, as a gateway to the northeastern region, is 108 km from Bangkok. It occupies an area of 3,499 square kilometres.

=== National parks ===
There are a total of three national parks, two of which are in region 1 (Saraburi branch) and Khao Yai in region 1 (Prachinburi) of Thailand's protected areas.

- Namtok Chet Sao Noi protects 42 km^{2} (16 sq mi) around a scenic waterfall.
- Namtok Sam Lan protects the Khao Sam Lan Forest, which consists of hilly landscape and is the source to several rivers and waterfalls. The highest elevation is the Khao Khrok at 329 m. The 45 km^{2} (17 sq mi) area was declared a national park in 1981.

== History ==
Saraburi has been an important city since ancient times.

The moated site of Kheedkhin, about 620 by 620 m, lies in the province and was excavated by Silpakorn University in 2007 and 2008. Occupation there begins in the Iron Age from about 500 BCE. The finds include carinated, spouted and stamped ware, a terracotta lion and a fragment of a dwarf (gana) figure. Radiocarbon ranges of up to 690 years either way left the sequence loosely dated, so Saritpong Khunsong worked by comparison instead, giving a prehistoric period of 550 BCE to 350 CE and a Dvaravati period of 550 to 750 CE. Stephen A. Murphy notes that the published article converts the second of these wrongly, as the 7th to 9th centuries. He also holds that the apparent gap between the two periods reflects the limits of the datable finds rather than a break in occupation. The site report shows continuity between the layers, and use of the site before the moat was built. The excavator publishes the site in English as Kishkindha.

Kheedkhin is also one of ten Dvaravati sites of the central plain whose glass beads Saritpong Khunsong reports on a compositional analysis. Beads of a Middle Eastern plant-ash soda-lime composition were identified there. Khunsong groups the site with Phromthin Tai in Lopburi and Si Thep as inland, against the towns nearer the coast, and reads imported beads at both groups as exchange within the plain alongside the overseas trade.

It is assumed to have been established about 1549 during the reign of King Maha Chakkraphat of the Kingdom of Ayutthaya. It is assumed that the king ordered parts of Lopburi and Nakhon Nayok to be combined to set up Saraburi Province with the aim of mobilizing citizens during times of war. From the Ayutthaya period, the story of Saraburi is usually related to battles and wars. As for the origin of the word "Saraburi", it is thought that due to its location near a swamp called "Bueng Nong Ngong", when the town was established a combination of sa ('swamp') and buri ('town') was suggested and the town was named "Saraburi".

== Climate ==
Saraburi has a tropical savanna climate, Aw (Climate Classification system of Koppen) The climate is arid with little rain in winter, relatively high temperatures in summer, cool in winter, and rain from May to October, about 70–90 days.

The average annual temperature is 28-29 degrees Celsius. Maximum temperatures average 33-34 degrees Celsius and minimum temperature averages 23–24 degrees Celsius. April is the hottest month of the year, while winters are cool in January.

=== Air quality ===
Saraburi has poor air quality resulting from cement production, chiefly stone crushing. In the area of Na Pra Lan Sub-district there are 133 plants, 17 mining sites, 32 stone mill plants, and 22 stone dressing plants. Air quality in the province frequently exceeds recommended limits for particulates.

== Education ==
There are 366 schools. There are a total of 125,255 students at all levels. Only higher academic institution, Asia Pacific International University is also here.

== Economy ==
In 2007 Saraburi's population had an average income per capita 214,537 baht per year, making it tenth highest in the country, second in the central provinces. Annual GDP was 129,275 million baht.

== Religion and culture ==
In 2007, Saraburi's population was 89.34 percent Buddhist, 597,138 people. There are 499 temples. There are total of 3,443 monks and 274 neophytes. Muslims number 953 (0.32 percent). There are five Christian churches.

== Symbols ==
The provincial seal shows the temple Wat Phra Buddha Baat. In the 17th century a hunter found a puddle of water which looked like a large footprint. It was declared a footprint of Buddha, and a temple was built around it. Phra Phutthabat means footprint of Buddha.

The provincial tree is Lagerstroemia floribunda and the provincial flower is the yellow cotton tree (Cochlospermum regium). The endemic crab, Larnaudia larnaudii is the provincial aquatic animal.

== Administrative divisions ==
=== Provincial government ===
Map of Saraburi with 13 districts

The province is divided into 13 districts (amphoe). The districts are further divided into 111 subdistricts (tambon) and 965 villages (muban).

1. Mueang Saraburi
2. Kaeng Khoi
3. Nong Khae
4. Wihan Daeng
5. Nong Saeng
6. Ban Mo
7. Don Phut
8. Nong Don
9. Phra Phutthabat
10. Sao Hai
11. Muak Lek
12. Wang Muang
13. Chaloem Phra Kiat

=== Local government ===
As of 26 November 2019 there are: one Saraburi Provincial Administrative Organization - PAO (ongkan borihan suan changwat) and 38 municipal (thesaban) areas in the province. Saraburi, Kaeng Khoi, Phra Phutthabat and Thap Kwang have town (thesaban mueang) status. Further 34 subdistrict municipalities (thesaban tambon). The non-municipal areas are administered by 70 Subdistrict Administrative Organizations - SAO (ongkan borihan suan tambon).

== Transport ==
=== Rail ===
Saraburi's main station is Saraburi Railway Station. There is a major rail junction at Kaeng Khoi Junction.

=== Road ===
Saraburi can be reached via Phahonyothin Road (Highway 1). Mittraphap Road (Highway 2), a main road in the northeastern region. It has a beginning here which is a route that separates from the right side of Phahonyothin Road.

== Health ==
The main hospital of Saraburi is Saraburi Hospital, operated by the Ministry of Public Health.

== Human achievement index 2022 ==
Health	Education	Employment	Income
51	37	27	17
Housing	Family	Transport	Participation
64	64	53	13
Province Saraburi, with an HAI 2022 value of 0.6360 is "average", occupies place 45 in the ranking.

Since 2003, United Nations Development Programme (UNDP) in Thailand has tracked progress on human development at sub-national level using the Human achievement index (HAI), a composite index covering all the eight key areas of human development. National Economic and Social Development Board (NESDB) has taken over this task since 2017.

Rank	Classification
1 - 13	"high"
14 - 29	"somewhat high"
30 - 45	"average"
46 - 61	"somewhat low"
62 - 77	"low"

Map with provinces and HAI 2022 rankings

== Notable people ==
- Pramarn Adireksarn (1913–2010), late politician
- Pongpol Adireksarn (born 1942), politician and author
- Veeraphol Sahaprom (born 1968), retired boxer and Muaythai fighter
- Arthit Tanusorn (born 1975), retired footballer
- Mick Tongraya (born 1992), actor
- Mink Nutcharut (born 1999), snooker player
