= Khu Khot =

Sub-district of Greater Bangkok

Coordinates: 13°57′N 100°38′E

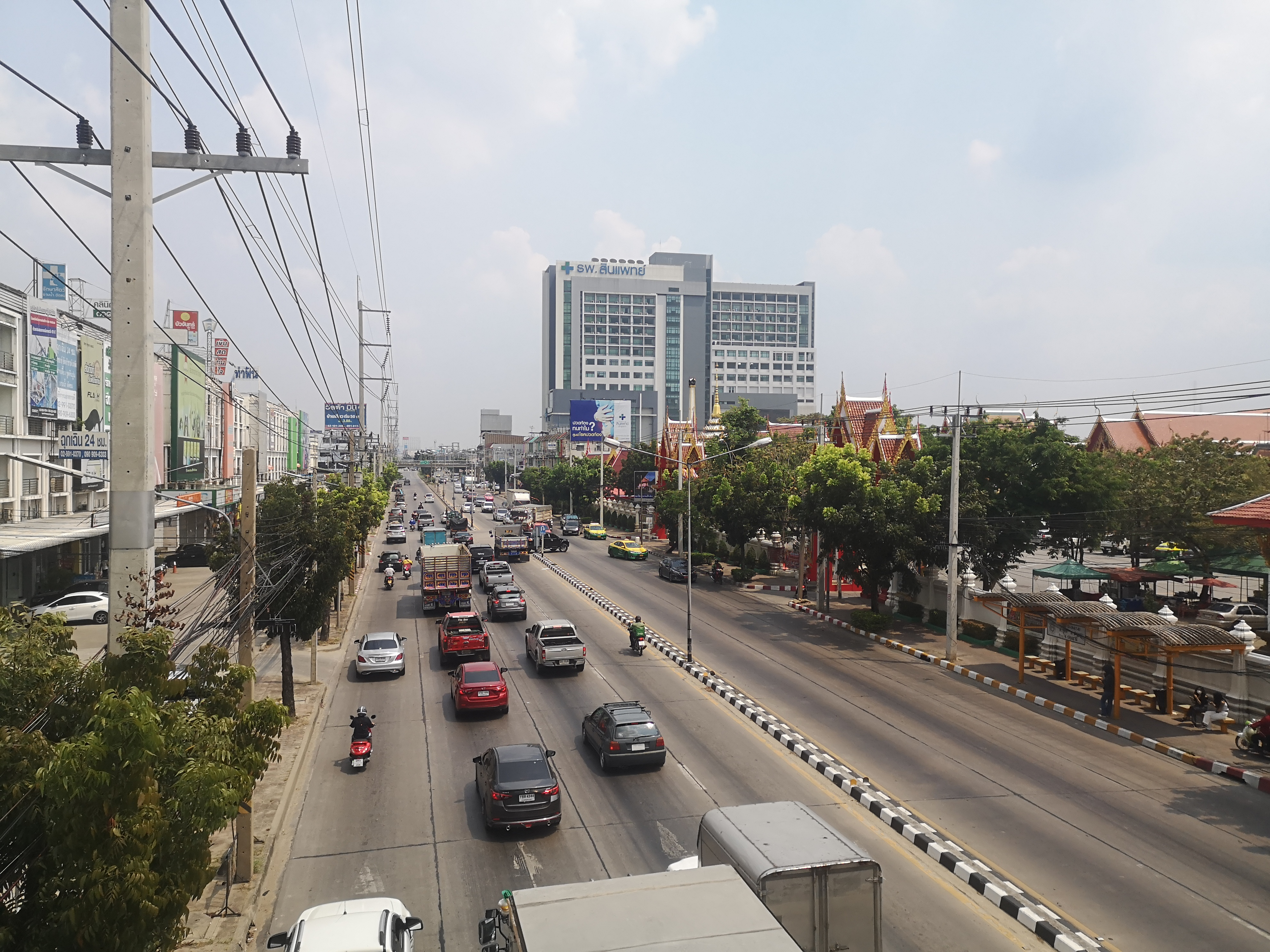
Lam Luk Ka Road in the area of Wat Sai Mai temple near Khu Khot BTS station

Khu Khot (Thai: คูคต, pronounced [kʰūː kʰót]) is a tambon (sub-district) in Lam Luk Ka district of Pathum Thani province, Greater Bangkok.

== History ==
Originally, "Sai Mai" was a muban (village) located within the area of Khu Khot. It was later separated to become part of Bang Khen district, Bangkok. Eventually, Sai Mai grew into a full-fledged district of its own.

The name "Khu Khot" can be directly translated as "meandering ditch", though the exact origin or intended meaning of the name remains uncertain.

On September 9, 1988, Vietnam Airlines Flight 831 crashed into a paddy field in Khu Khot.

More recently, on October 1, 2024, a tragic school field trip accident occurred in the same area, when a bus carrying students from Uthai Thani caught fire on Vibhavadi Rangsit Road, near the National Memorial. The incident claimed 23 lives, including 20 students and 3 teachers.

== Geography ==
Khu Khot is regarded as the westernmost part of Lam Luk Ka district, about 16 km (9.9 mi) north of the centre of Lam Luk Ka, and about 16 km (9.9 mi) south of the city of Pathum Thani.

The area bounded by other places (from the north clockwise): Prachathipat in Thanyaburi district, Lat Sawai in its district, Sanam Bin in Don Mueang district and Sai Mai in Sai Mai district (Bangkok), with Lak Hok in Mueang Pathum Thani district, respectively.

Khu Khot has total area of 24.975 km^{2} (9.642 mi^{2}).

== Administration ==
Khu Khot is further divided into 18 administrative villages.

The sub-district also governed by two local governments: Khu Khot Town Municipality and Lam Sam Kaeo Town Municipality.

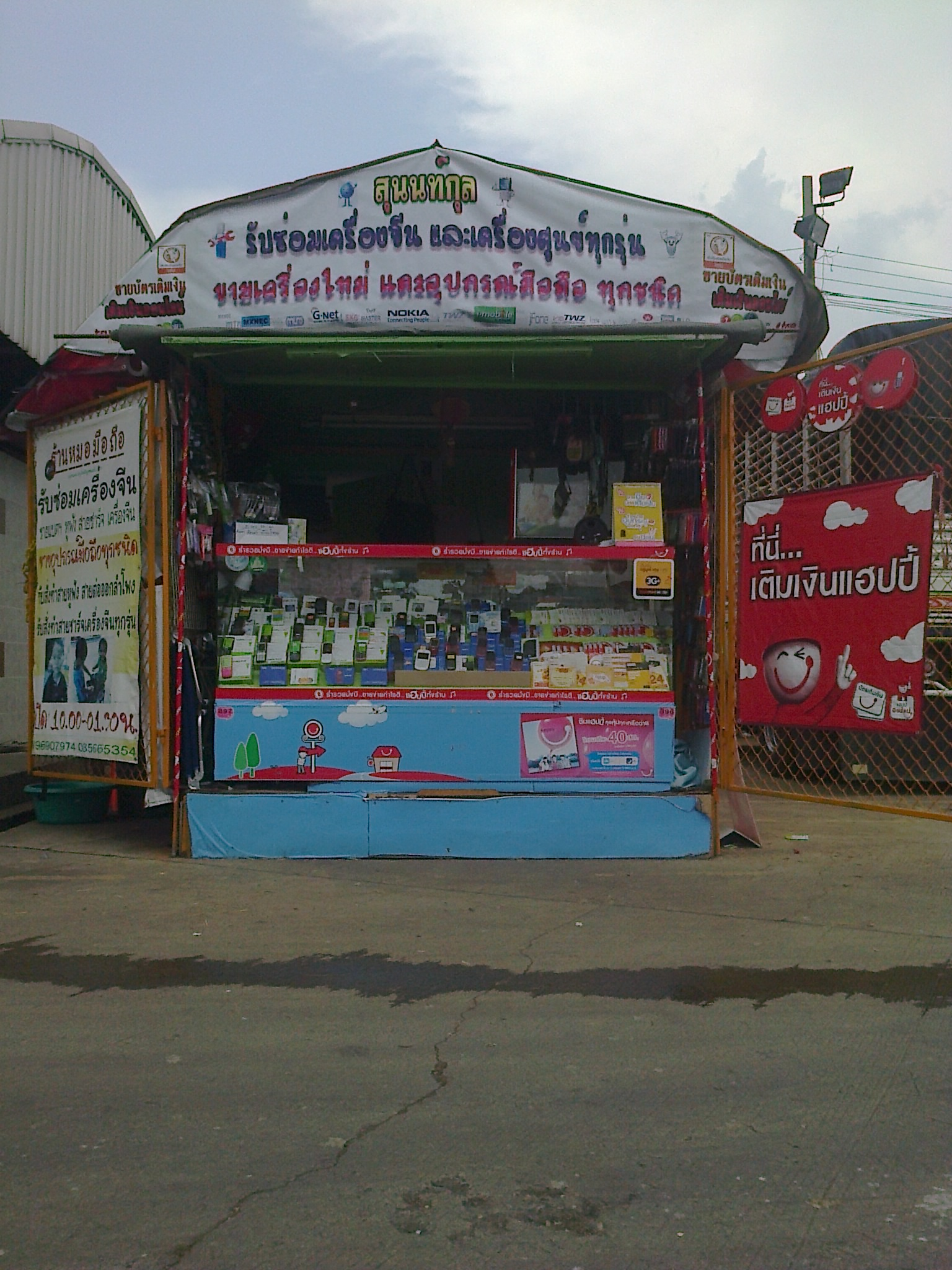
Mobile phone shop in Si Mum Mueang Market

== Population ==
In 2018, it had total population of 110,750 people (45,009 in Khu Khot Town Municipality, 65,741 in Lam Sam Kaeo Town Municipality).

== Transportation ==
Khu Khot is served by Khu Khot Station, the current northern terminus of Sukhumvit line (Light Green line) of the BTS skytrain. The next station to the south is Yaek Kor Por Aor BTS station.

Phaholyothin (Highway 1) and Vibhavadi Rangsit Roads (Highway 31), with Lam Luk Ka Road (Highway 3312) are the main thoroughfare.

== Places ==
- Si Mum Mueang Market, the largest agricultural distribution centre in the country
- Thai National Memorial
- Thupatemi Stadium, the official stadium of the Royal Thai Air Force (RTAF)
- Zeer Rangsit, IT equipment store
- PatRangsit Hospital, the first private hospital in Pathum Thani
