= Lat Sawai =

Lat Sawai ลาดสวาย
- Tambon
- Etymology: "Slope of Iridescent Shark"
- Location in Bangkok Metropolitan Region
- Coordinates: 13°58′00.4″N 100°41′25.3″E
- Country: Thailand
- Province: Pathum Thani
- District: Lam Luk Ka
- Named for: Iridescent Shark

Government
  - Type: Town Municipality
  - Mayor: Winai Sangwanngoen

Area
  - Total: 33 km^{2} (13 sq mi)

Population (December 2022)
  - Total: 70,223
- Time zone: UTC+7 (ICT)
- Postcode: 12150
- Area code: (+66) 02
- Website: https://ladsawai.go.th/public/

Lat Sawai (Thai: ลาดสวาย) is a tambon (sub-district) of Lam Luk Ka district, Pathum Thani province, northern outskirts of Bangkok.

== History ==
The past landscape of Lam Luk Ka was fertile. As it is a wetland area, there are many kinds of wildlife living. And also has a large pond rich in iridescent shark, a medium-large sized freshwater catfish in shark catfish family. Hence the name (Note: Sawai in Thai means iridescent shark.)

The sub-district was upgraded to town municipality in 2011 along with two nearby sub-districts, Khu Khot and Lam Sam Kaeo.

== Geography ==
Adjacent sub-districts are (from the north clockwise): Bueng Yitho in Thanyaburi district, Bueng Kham Phroi in its district, Sai Mai in Sai Mai district of Bangkok.

Lat Sawai is about 7 km (4.3 mi) from the Thupatemi Stadium.

== Administration ==
=== Central administration ===
The entire area of Lat Sawai is under the administration of Lat Sawai Town Municipality.

The emblem of Lat Sawai Town Municipality features iridescent shark above the water with lotuses and ears of rice adorning the edging both sides in a blue frame.

=== Local administration ===
It was also divided into 11 administrative muban (villages).

No.	Name	Thai
1.	Ban Khlong Ha	บ้านคลองห้า
2.	Ban Khlong Ha	บ้านคลองห้า
3.	Ban Khlong Hok Wa	บ้านคลองหกวา
4.	Ban Khlong Si	บ้านคลองสี่
5.	Ban Khlong Si	บ้านคลองสี่
6.	Ban Khlong Si	บ้านคลองสี่
7.	Ban Khlong Hok Wa	บ้านคลองหกวา
8.	Ban Khlong Sam	บ้านคลองสาม
9.	Ban Khlong Sam	บ้านคลองสาม
10.	Ban Khlong Sam	บ้านคลองสาม
11.	Ban Nong Yai	บ้านหนองใหญ่

== Population ==
By the end of 2022, it had a total population of 70,223 people.
