= List of municipalities in Thailand =

City municipalities (Nakhon) in Thailand. *Green dots represent multiple cities within an area
City municipalities in Bangkok Metropolitan Region (BMR): Bang Bua Thong, Nonthaburi, Pak Kret, Samut Prakan, and Rangsit
City municipalities in Chonburi province (CBP): Ban Suan, Chaophraya Surasak and Laem Chabang
City municipalities in Samut Sakhon province (SSP): Samut Sakhon and Om Noi

Thailand divides its settlements (thesaban) into three categories by size: city municipalities (thesaban nakhon), towns (thesaban mueang) and townships (or subdistrict municipality) (thesaban tambon). As of April 2025, there are 35 city municipalities, excluding Bangkok and Pattaya.

The national capital Bangkok and the special governed city Pattaya fall outside these divisions, as they are "self-governing districts".

Due to the outdated nature of the thesaban system, any city municipality's growth subsequent to its settlement designation is not included in both area and population numbers. For this reason, the Department of Public Works and Town & Country Planning, and each province's Provincial Administrative Organization regularly revise and publish up-to-date city boundaries (Thai: เขตเมือง) to reflect population growth. These revisions are royally decreed and published in the Royal Thai Government Gazette. The term เขตเมือง/khet mueang can also be translated to the term urban area, a widely used term to describe and designate large cities.

Most Thai cities' revised boundaries are contained in the province's capital district, known as Amphoe Mueang. Chiang Mai is the only city outside Bangkok to cover multiple districts in its urban area. Bangkok and Chiang Mai are the only cities in Thailand with a population of over one million.

Thailand has an urbanization rate of 52% (2021), translating to 36,217,020 people of the total population. This rate is based on the thesaban system, meaning that 8,442,107 people live in city municipalities, 4,437,112 people live in town municipalities and 23,337,801 people in townships (subdistrict municipalities). According to the khet mueang system, 21,838,418 people (31.35% of total population) live in urban areas with a population greater than 150,000.

Several agencies issue population figures. Locally registered Thai populations are compiled by the Department of Local Administration (DLA). These figures are labeled as "Locally Registered Thai Population" and reflect the migrant, upcountry, and seasonal nature of Thai labor flows to the capital and tourist hot spots, yet maintain upcountry registration. Figures are very different from those by the National Statistics Office (NSO), which conducts the decennial census by attempting to count the total resident Thai population plus under 1,000 permanent resident foreigners. The result by the NSO is labeled as "Total Thai Population". Neither of the two offices release municipal level figures that include non-permanent residents, long-stay expatriates and figures for contracted foreign ASEAN migrants (a significant labor segment in cities like Bangkok, Pattaya, Chiang Mai, and Phuket, totaling two to three million workers), though this inclusion is being increasingly regularized since 2014. The NSO did release projected figures including regularized ASEAN migrants, i.e., "total resident population" down to the provincial level for 2017.

== City municipalities ==
The table below lists Department of Local Administration (DLA) (local registered Thai) 2020 figures. For the NSO compiled total Thai resident decennial census municipal counts view here..

In most cases, municipal population numbers do not represent the current size of each individual city, but only the administrative core. Geographically limited city municipalities such as Koh Samui and the suburban city municipalities of Bangkok, namely Nonthaburi, Pak Kret, Samut Prakan, Nakhon Pathom, and Samut Sakhon, are the exception. Bangkok's suburban areas are inside the Bangkok Metropolitan Region and therefore do not have their own urban or metropolitan area.

No.	Name	Thai	District, Province	Area (km2)	Population (Dec 2020)	Date, city designation
1	Krung Thep Maha Nakhon (Bangkok)	กรุงเทพมหานคร		1,568.74	5,588,222	1972-12-14
2	Nonthaburi	นนทบุรี	Mueang Nonthaburi, Nonthaburi	38.90	251,026	1995-09-23
3	Pak Kret	ปากเกร็ด	Pak Kret, Nonthaburi	36.04	189,458	2000-02-16
4	Hat Yai	หาดใหญ่	Hat Yai, Songkhla	21.00	149,459	1995-09-23
5	Chaophraya Surasak	เจ้าพระยาสุรศักดิ์	Si Racha, Chonburi	276.98	146,474	2013-05-01
6	Surat Thani	สุราษฎร์ธานี	Mueang Surat Thani, Surat Thani	68.97	131,599	2007-05-04
7	Nakhon Ratchasima	นครราชสีมา	Mueang Nakhon Ratchasima, Nakhon Ratchasima	37.50	122,730	1995-09-23
8	Chiang Mai	เชียงใหม่	Mueang Chiang Mai, Chiang Mai	40.22	122,627	1936-03-28
9	Udon Thani	อุดรธานี	Mueang Udon Thani, Udon Thani	47.70	120,202	1995-09-23
10	Pattaya	พัทยา	Bang Lamung, Chonburi	53.44	117,606	1978-11-29
11	Khon Kaen	ขอนแก่น	Mueang Khon Kaen, Khon Kaen	46.00	110,615	1995-09-23
12	Nakhon Si Thammarat	นครศรีธรรมราช	Mueang Nakhon Si Thammarat, Nakhon Si Thammarat	22.56	100,416	1994-08-15
13	Laem Chabang	แหลมฉบัง	Si Racha, Chonburi	88.59	89,457	2010-05-24
14	Rangsit	รังสิต	Thanyaburi, Pathum Thani	20.80	84,268	2011-04-29
15	Nakhon Sawan	นครสวรรค์	Mueang Nakhon Sawan, Nakhon Sawan	27.87	81,239	1995-09-23
16	Phuket	ภูเก็ต	Mueang Phuket, Phuket	12.00	77,778	2004-02-13
17	Chiang Rai	เชียงราย	Mueang Chiang Rai, Chiang Rai	60.85	77,545	2004-02-13
18	Ubon Ratchathani	อุบลราชธานี	Mueang Ubon Ratchathani, Ubon Ratchathani	29.04	72,855	1999-03-06
19	Nakhon Pathom	นครปฐม	Mueang Nakhon Pathom, Nakhon Pathom	19.85	72,753	1999-11-07
20	Ko Samui	เกาะสมุย	Ko Samui district, Surat Thani	252.00	68,994	2012-09-14
21	Samut Sakhon	สมุทรสาคร	Mueang Samut Sakhon, Samut Sakhon	10.33	65,409	1999-11-07
22	Phitsanulok	พิษณุโลก	Mueang Phitsanulok, Phitsanulok	18.26	64,068	1999-03-06
23	Rayong	ระยอง	Mueang Rayong, Rayong	16.95	62,384	1999-11-07
24	Songkhla	สงขลา	Mueang Songkhla, Songkhla	9.27	60,021	1999-11-07
25	Yala	ยะลา	Mueang Yala, Yala	19.00	59,983	1995-09-23
26	Trang	ตรัง	Mueang Trang, Trang	14.77	56,893	1999-11-07
27	Om Noi	อ้อมน้อย	Krathum Baen, Samut Sakhon	30.40	53,822	2010-11-11
28	Sakon Nakhon	สกลนคร	Mueang Sakon Nakhon, Sakon Nakhon	54.54	51,331	2012-03-08
29	Lampang	ลำปาง	Mueang Lampang, Lampang	22.17	50,697	1999-11-07
30	Samut Prakan	สมุทรปราการ	Mueang Samut Prakan, Samut Prakan	7.33	49,604	1999-03-23
31	Phra Nakhon Si Ayutthaya	พระนครศรีอยุธยา	Phra Nakhon Si Ayutthaya, Phra Nakhon Si Ayutthaya	14.84	49,208	1999-12-14
32	Mae Sot	แม่สอด	Mae Sot, Tak	27.20	41,581	2010-01-28
33	Buriram	บุรีรัมย์	Mueang Buriram, Buriram	75.44	25,087	2024-10-31
34	Bang Bua Thong	บางบัวทอง	Bang Bua Thong, Nonthaburi	TBD	TBD	2025-01-20
35	Ban Suan	บ้านสวน	Mueng Chonburi, Chonburi	TBD	TBD	2025-03-28
36	Hua Hin	หัวหิน	Hua Hin, Prachuap Khiri Khan	86.36	65,033	2025-03-28
37	Map Ta Phut	มาบตาพุด	Mueng Rayong, Rayong	TBD	TBD	2025-03-28

== Largest cities by urban population ==
The following table lists the 10 largest cities in Thailand by urban population, based on Department of Local Administration (DLA) figures. These figures represent the current size of each city, accounting for area and population growth subsequent to each city's original city municipality designation.

Bangkok and Chiang Mai are the only cities covering multiple districts (known as Khet for Bangkok and Amphoe for the provinces), and the only two cities with a population of over one million. Although Pattaya is a "self-governing district" (located inside, but not part of Bang Lamung district), it has grown into all neighboring sub-districts and accounts for the largest population percentage, making it de facto a part of the "Pattaya-Bang Lamung-Jomtien" area. Chiang Mai is the only provincial city whose city boundaries (Thai: เขตเมือง) cover districts adjacent to the Amphoe Mueang district (Capital district).

No.	Name	Thai	Province	Area (km2)	Population (October 2026)
1	Krung Thep Maha Nakhon (Bangkok)	กรุงเทพมหานคร		1,568.74	10,539,000
2	Chiang Mai	เชียงใหม่	Chiang Mai	405	1,198,000
3	Nakhon Ratchasima	นครราชสีมา	Nakhon Ratchasima	755.6	470,174
4	Khon Kaen	ขอนแก่น	Khon Kaen	953.4	418,109
5	Hat Yai	หาดใหญ่	Songkhla	852.796	406,720
6	Udon Thani	อุดรธานี	Udon Thani	1,094.7	397,061
7	Pattaya	พัทยา	Chon Buri	727	355,073
8	Chon Buri	ชลบุรี	Chon Buri	228.8	354,366
9	Si Racha	ศรีราชา	Chon Buri	616.4	340,871
10	Rayong	ระยอง	Rayong	514.5	293,025

== Gallery of cityscapes ==
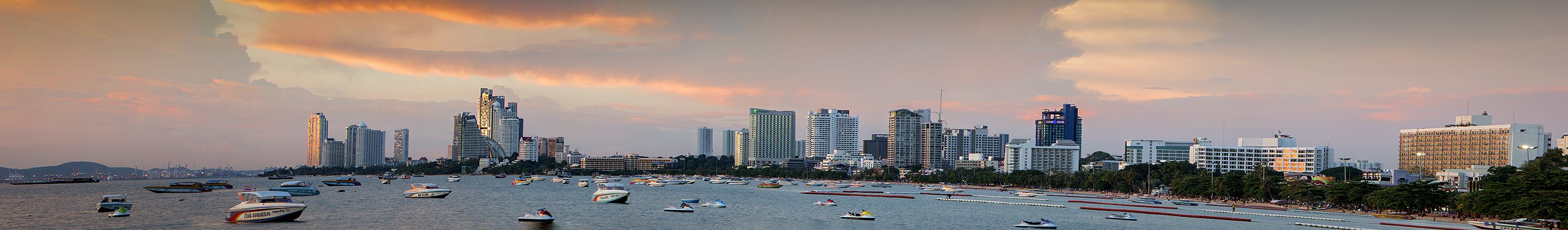
Pattaya

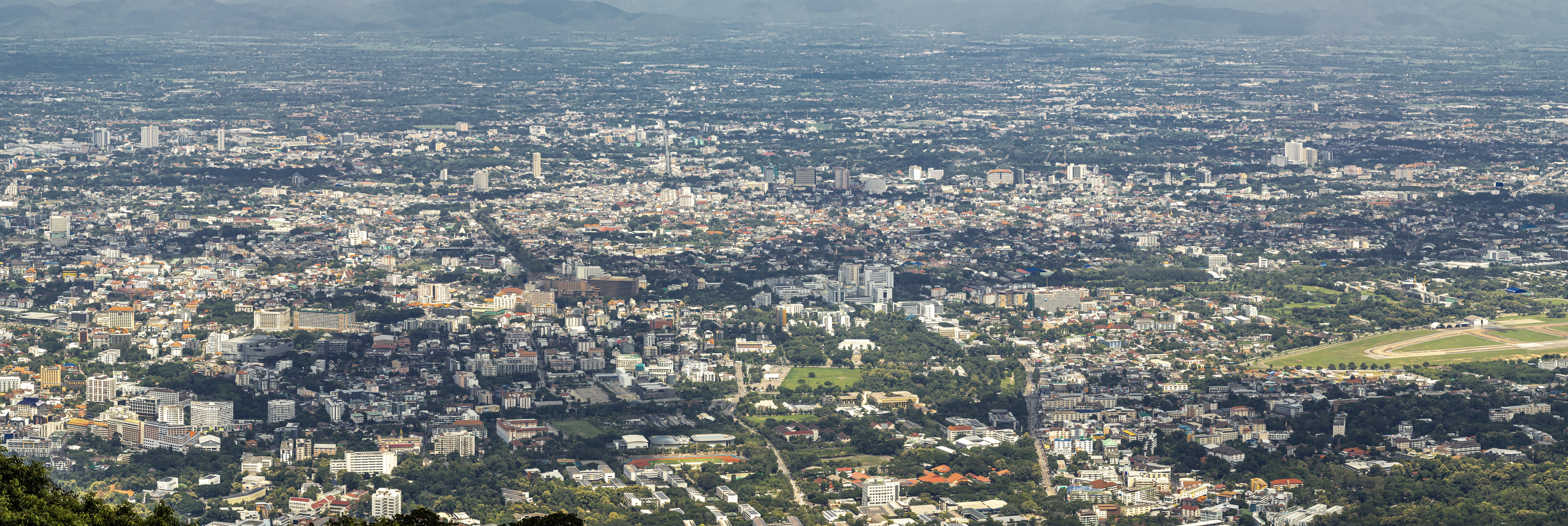
Chiang Mai, the largest urban area in the north and second-largest urban area in the country

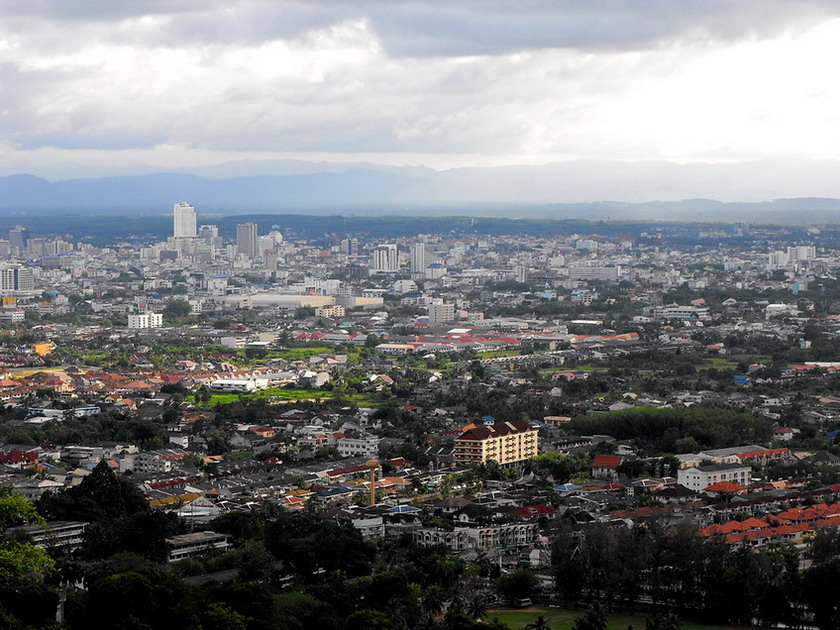
Hat Yai, part of the largest urban area (conurbation) in the south (Greater Hat Yai-Songkhla)

== Town municipalities ==
Map of Bangkok and the 76 provinces of Thailand

An ethnolinguistic map of Thailand

Department of Local Administration (DLA) figures. The towns in bold characters are capitals.

Name	Thai	Province	Population (2015)
**Amnat Charoen**	อำนาจเจริญ	Amnat Charoen	26,634
Ang Sila	อ่างศิลา	Chon Buri	30,538
**Ang Thong**	อ่างทอง	Ang Thong	13,134
Aranyaprathet	อรัญญประเทศ	Sa Kaeo	15,141
Aranyik	อรัญญิก	Phitsanulok	29,525
Ayothaya	อโยธยา	Phra Nakhon Si Ayutthaya	18,571
Ban Bueng	บ้านบึง	Chonburi	15,006
Ban Chang	บ้านฉาง	Rayong	17,025
Ban Dung	บ้านดุง	Udon Thani	16,146
Ban Mi	บ้านหมี่	Lopburi	4,448
Ban Phai	บ้านไผ่	Khon Kaen	32,604
Ban Phru	บ้านพรุ	Songkhla	25,128
Ban Pong	บ้านโป่ง	Ratchaburi	21,892
Ban Suan	บ้านสวน	Chon Buri	60,797
Ban Thum	บ้านทุ่ม	Khon Kaen	17,188
Bang Bua Thong	บางบัวทอง	Nonthaburi	35,761
Bang Khu Wat	บางคูวัด	Pathum Thani	18,536
Bang Kruai	บางกรวย	Nonthaburi	42,649
Bang Mun Nak	บางมูลนาก	Phichit	9,422
Bang Rachan	บางระจัน	Sing Buri	16,131
Bang Rin	บางริ้น	Ranong	18,788
Bang Si Mueang	บางศรีเมือง	Nonthaburi	26,754
Betong	เบตง	Yala	24,385
Bua Khao	บัวขาว	Kalasin	12,252
Bua Yai	บัวใหญ่	Nakhon Ratchasima	16,505
Bueng Kan	บึงกาฬ	Bueng Kan	20,103
Bueng Yitho	บึงยี่โถ	Pathum Thani	24,230
Cha-am	ชะอำ	Phetchaburi	28,925
**Chachoengsao**	ฉะเชิงเทรา	Chachoengsao	43,812
Chaeramae	แจระแม	Ubon Ratchathani	12,450
**Chai Nat**	ชัยนาท	Chai Nat	16,499
**Chaisatarn**	น่าน	Nan	8,657
**Chaiyaphum**	ชัยภูมิ	Chaiyaphum	42,436
**Chanthaburi**	จันทบุรี	Chanthaburi	28,011
Chanthanimit	จันทนิมิต	Chanthaburi	14,008
**Chonburi**	ชลบุรี	Chonburi	41,014
Chum Het	ชุมเห็ด	Buriram	19,945
Chum Phae	ชุมแพ	Khon Kaen	33,689
Chum Saeng	ชุมแสง	Nakhon Sawan	10,701
**Chumphon**	ชุมพร	Chumphon	34,895
Det Udom	เดชอุดม	Ubon Ratchathani	14,859
Dok Khamtai	ดอกคำใต้	Phayao	14,255
Don Sak	ดอนสัก	Surat Thani	10,145
Kaeng Khoi	แก่งคอย	Saraburi	12,172
**Kalasin**	กาฬสินธุ์	Kalasin	36,955
**Kamphaeng Phet**	กำแพงเพชร	Kamphaeng Phet	31,192
Kamphaeng Phet	กำแพงเพชร	Songkhla	14,748
**Kanchanaburi**	กาญจนบุรี	Kanchanaburi	39,123
Kantang	กันตัง	Trang	13,656
Kantharalak	กันทรลักษ์	Sisaket	20,175
Kathu	กะทู้	Phuket	20,420
Khao Rup Chang	เขารูปช้าง	Songkhla	42,111
Khao Sam Yot	เขาสามยอด	Lopburi	14,776
Khelang Nakhon	เขลางค์นคร	Lampang	60,646
Khlong Hae	คลองแห	Songkhla	38,156
Khlong Luang	คลองหลวง	Pathum Thani	43,273
Khlung	ขลุง	Chanthaburi	11,996
Kho Hong	คอหงส์	Songkhla	46,184
Khuan Lang	ควนลัง	Songkhla	47,024
Khu Khot	คูคต	Pathum Thani	40,634
**Krabi**	กระบี่	Krabi	24,611
Kranuan	กระนวน	Khon Kaen	12,215
Krathum Baen	กระทุ่มแบน	Samut Sakhon	16,211
Krathum Lom	กระทุ่มล้ม	Nakhon Pathom	13,558
Lam Sam Kaeo	ลำสามแก้ว	Pathum Thani	42,153
Lam Ta Sao	ลำตาเสา	Phra Nakhon Si Ayutthaya	14,483
**Lamphun**	ลำพูน	Lamphun	15,322
Lang Suan	หลังสวน	Chumphon	9,954
Lat Luang	ลัดหลวง	Samut Prakan	73,196
Lat Sawai	ลาดสวาย	Pathum Thani	48,211
**Loei**	เลย	Loei	23,725
Lom Raet	ล้อมแรด	Lampang	15,014
Lom Sak	หล่มสัก	Phetchabun	14,415
**Lopburi**	ลพบุรี	Lopburi	30,791
Mae Jo	แม่โจ้	Chiang Mai	16,001
Mae Hia	แม่เหียะ	Chiang Mai	14,356
**Mae Hong Son**	แม่ฮ่องสอน	Mae Hong Son	6,208
**Maha Sarakham**	มหาสารคาม	Maha Sarakham	46,523
Map Ta Phut	มาบตาพุด	Rayong	33,794
Muang Ngam	ม่วงงาม	Songkhla	11,165
Mueang Kaen Phatthana	เมืองแกนพัฒนา	Chiang Mai	14,342
Mueang Pak	เมืองปัก	Nakhon Ratchasima	13,848
Mueang Phon	เมืองพล	Khon Kaen	14,220
**Mukdahan**	มุกดาหาร	Mukdahan	35,313
Nà Sản	นาสาร	Surat Thani	19,445
**Nakhon Nayok**,	นครนายก	Nakhon Nayok	17,596
**Nakhon Phanom**	นครพนม	Nakhon Phanom	31,449
**Nan**	น่าน	Nan	22,273
Nang Rong	นางรอง	Buriram	20,798
**Narathiwat**	นราธิวาส	Narathiwat	42,890
Nong Sung-Nam Kham	โนนสูง-น้ำคำ	Udon Thani	10,440
**Nong Bua Lamphu**	หนองบัวลำภู	Nong Bua Lamphu	22,061
**Nong Khai**	หนองคาย	Nong Khai	46,180
Nong Pling	หนองปลิง	Kamphaeng Phet	11,940
Nong Prue	หนองปรือ	Chon Buri	46,098
Nong Samrong	หนองสำโรง	Udon Thani	39,489
Pa Tong	ป่าตอง	Phuket	13,051
Padang Besar	ปาดังเบซาร์	Songkhla	16,189
Pak Chong	ปากช่อง	Nakhon Ratchasima	40,487
Pak Nam Samut Prakan	ปากน้ำสมุทรปราการ	Samut Prakan	20,822
Pak Phanang	ปากพนัง	Nakhon Si Thammarat	24,716
Pak Phun	ปากพูน	Nakhon Si Thammarat	32,622
Pang Makha	ปางมะค่า	Kamphaeng Phet	19,945
**Pathum Thani**	ปทุมธานี	Pathum Thani	19,031
**Pattani**	ปัตตานี	Pattani	45,914
Phak Hai	ผักไห่	Phra Nakhon Si Ayutthaya	9,429
Phanat Nikhom	พนัสนิคม	Chon Buri	12,555
**Phang Nga**	พังงา	Phang Nga	9,385
**Phatthalung**	พัทลุง	Phatthalung	43,065
**Phayao**	พะเยา	Phayao	20,680
**Phetchabun**	เพชรบูรณ์	Phetchabun	25,695
**Phetchaburi**	เพชรบุรี	Phetchaburi	32,396
Phibun Mangsahan	พิบูลมังสาหาร	Ubon Ratchathani	11,987
Phichai	พิชัย	Lampang	11,695
**Phichit**	พิจิตร	Phichit	24,775
Phimonrat	พิมลราช	Nonthaburi	39,815
Photharam	โพธาราม	Ratchaburi	11,987
Phra Phutthabat	พระพุทธบาท	Saraburi	49,572
Phra Pradaeng	พระประแดง	Samut Prakan	10,540
**Phrae**	แพร่	Phrae	18,173
**Prachinburi**	ปราจีนบุรี	Prachinburi	21,125
**Prachuap Khiri Khan**	ประจวบคีรีขันธ์	Prachuap Khiri Khan	18,380
Prok Fa	ปรกฟ้า	Chon Buri	14,254
Pu Chao Saming Phrai	ปู่เจ้าสมิงพราย	Samut Prakan	77,976
Rai Khing	ไร่ขิง	Nakhon Pathom	20,752
**Ranong**	ระนอง	Ranong	15,364
**Ratchaburi**	ราชบุรี	Ratchaburi	44,983
**Roi Et**	ร้อยเอ็ด	Roi Et	37,131
**Sa Kaeo**	สระแก้ว	Sa Kaeo	16,393
Sadao	สะเดา	Songkhla	21,753
Saen Suk	แสนสุข	Chon Buri	39,563
Sam Phran	สามพราน	Nakhon Pathom	16,253
**Samut Songkhram**	สมุทรสงคราม	Samut Songkhram	35,475
Sanan Rak	สนันรักษ์	Pathum Thani	16,002
**Saraburi**	สระบุรี	Saraburi	67,858
Sateng Nok	สะเตงนอก	Yala	24,714
Sattahip	สัตหีบ	Chon Buri	23,107
**Satun**	สตูล	Satun	22,994
Sawankhalok	สวรรคโลก	Sukhothai	19,966
Sena	เสนา	Phra Nakhon Si Ayutthaya	5,048
Si Racha	ศรีราชา	Chonburi	25,999
Si Satchanalai	ศรีสัชนาลัย	Sukhothai	15,688
Sikhio	สีคิ้ว	Nakhon Ratchasima	18,644
Sila	ศิลา	Khon Kaen	47,070
**Sing Buri**	สิงห์บุรี	Sing Buri	21,148
Singhanakhon	สิงหนคร	Songkhla	39,274
**Sisaket**	ศรีสะเกษ	Sisaket	41,680
Song Phi Nong	สองพี่น้อง	Suphanburi	27,677
**Sukhothai Thani**	สุโขทัยธานี	Sukhothai	19,576
Su-ngai Kolok	สุไหงโก-ลก	Narathiwat	40,409
**Suphanburi**	สุพรรณบุรี	Suphanburi	27,677
**Surin**	สุรินทร์	Surin	41,818
**Tak**	ตาก	Tak	24,360
Tak Bai	ตากใบ	Narathiwat	17,419
Takhli	ตาคลี	Nakhon Sawan	34,492
Takua Pa	ตะกั่วป่า	Phang Nga	8,145
Taluban	ตะลุบัน	Pattani	14,144
Taphan Hin	ตะพานหิน	Phichit	21,199
Tha Bo	ท่าบ่อ	Nong Khai	21,126
Tha Chang	ท่าช้าง	Chanthaburi	10,864
Tha Kham	ท่าข้าม	Surat Thani	22,250
Tha Khlong	ท่าโขลง	Pathum Thani	34,221
Tha Mai	ท่าใหม่	Chanthaburi	10,258
Tha Ruea Phra Thaen	ท่าเรือพระแท่น	Kanchanaburi	13,136
Thap Kwang	ทับกวาง	Saraburi	16,977
Thung Song	ทุ่งสง	Nakhon Si Thammarat	27,244
Thung Tam Sao	ทุ่งตำเสา	Songkhla	16,706
Ton Pao	ต้นเปา	Chiang Mai	12,452
**Trat**	ตราด	Trat	15,501
**Uthai Thani**	อุทัยธานี	Uthai Thani	18,968
**Uttaradit**	อุตรดิตถ์	Uttaradit	43,945
Wang Nam Yen	วังน้ำเย็น	Sa Kaeo	22,888
Wang Saphung	วังสะพุง	Loei	12,558
Warin Chamrap	วารินชำราบ	Ubon Ratchathani	31,673
Wichian Buri	วิเชียรบุรี	Phetchabun	24,804
**Yasothon**	ยโสธร	Yasothon	22,350

== Township municipalities ==
There were 2,266 township municipalities as of 20 December 2017.

Name	Thai	Province	Population (2015)
Chai Prakan	ไชยปราการ	Chiang Mai	16,044
Mae Ai	แม่อาย	Chiang Mai	8,480
Mae Sai	แม่สาย	Chiang Rai	22,778
Nong Bua	หนองบัว	Chiang Mai	13,302
Mae Kha	แม่ข่า	Chiang Mai	7,707
Ban Mae Kha	บ้านแม่ข่า	Chiang Mai	2,001
Phimai	พิมาย	Nakhon Ratchasima	9,878
Wiang Fang	เวียงฝาง	Chiang Mai	7,652
