= 2024 Pathum Thani school bus fire =

2024 bus crash in Thailand

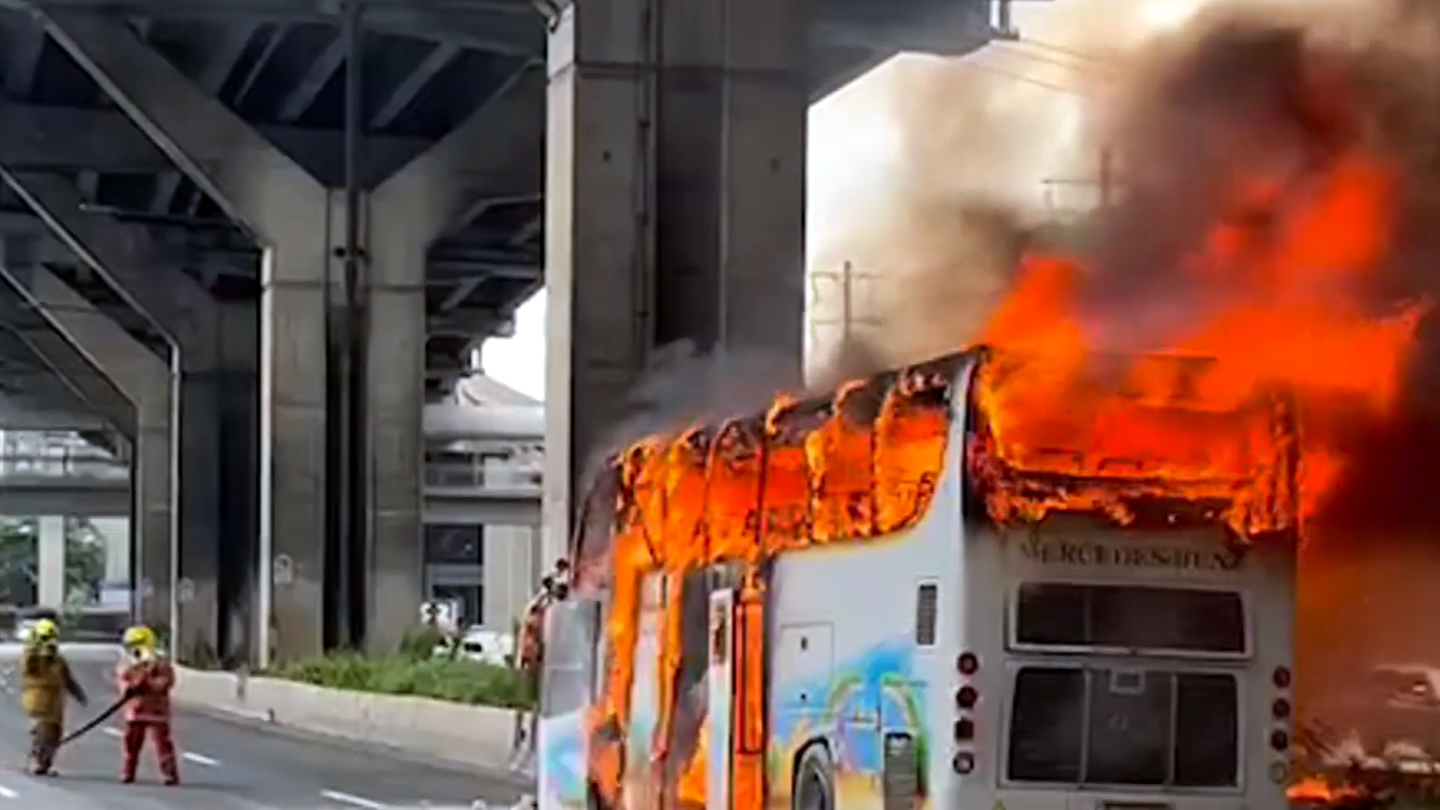
- Firefighters extinguishing the bus in flames
- Date: 1 October 2024
- Time: 12:29 ICT (UTC+07:00)
- Location: Vibhavadi Rangsit Road, Khu Khot, Lam Luk Ka District, Pathum Thani Province, Thailand
- Deaths: 23
- Injuries: 19

On 1 October 2024, a bus carrying students and teachers crashed and caught fire while traveling on an outbound lane of Vibhavadi Rangsit Road in Khu Khot, Lam Luk Ka District, Pathum Thani Province, Thailand, across from soi Phahonyothin 72, resulting in 23 deaths, 20 of which were school students.

The bus was carrying 44 passengers, 38 school students from pre-school to middle school years and 6 teachers. An explosion of the right front wheel's tire resulted in the vehicle losing control and crashing into a roadside barrier. A fire began in the lower section of the bus, which was powered by natural gas. Of those on board, 16 students and 3 teachers escaped. The remaining 23 passengers were later confirmed dead.

== Background ==
Thailand has one of the highest traffic fatality rates in the world, attributed to unsafe vehicles and reckless driving. Annual deaths attributed to traffic are approximately 20,000 and about a million injured.

The crash was the latest in a series of recent incidents involving school buses in the region. On 1 March 2024, a school bus crashed into a lorry in Dan Khun Thot District, Nakhon Ratchasima Province, causing one fatality. On 11 August 2018, a school bus-for-hire crashed into a tree in Tak Bai District, Narathiwat Province, leaving 10 people dead.

In 2016, then prime minister Prayut Chan-o-cha announced a ban on all two-story buses, such as the one involved in the incident. However, according to a ThaiPBS investigation, the law that followed – imposed in 2017 – by the Department of Land Transport only comes down to a restriction of buses' height to 4 metres. The law however does not apply retroactively to buses registered before 2017 – which instead needed to pass a 30-degree recline test by 2020.

The 41-seat bus belonged to a bus-for-hire company Chinnabut Tour (ชินบุตรทัวร์) and was one of the three buses travelling from Wat Khao Phraya Sangkharam School (โรงเรียนวัดเขาพระยาสังฆาราม), a public school in Lan Sak District, Uthai Thani Province, for a field trip that was to have included stops at Wat Phra Si Sanphet, Ayutthaya Province, and an EGAT centre in Nonthaburi Province. Registered in Saraburi Province, the bus that crashed was the second in the caravan. On board were 45 passengers consisting of six teachers and 39 school students.

== Crash ==
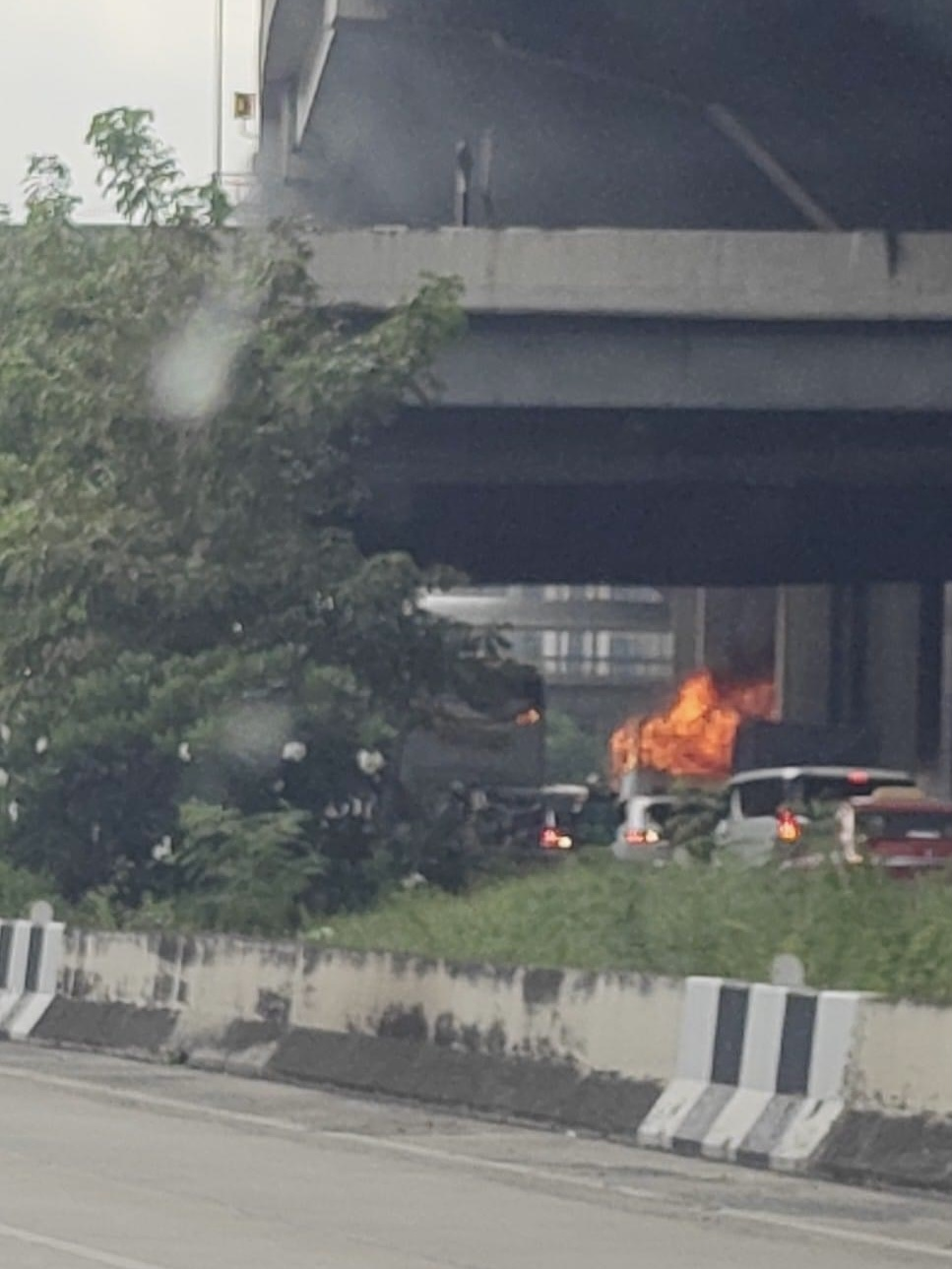
The fire as seen from a drive-by on Vibhavadi Rangsit Road

The bus was engulfed in flames at 12:29 pm UTC+07:00 while travelling outbound on Vibhavadi Rangsit Road in Khu Khot, Lam Luk Ka District, Pathum Thani Province, at a section between Zeer Rangsit shopping centre and the Thai National Memorial. The fire was reported at around noon and fully extinguished less than an hour later. However, responding firefighters reported being unable to enter the bus for hours after due to the heat which potentially could have caused more explosions from the natural gas.

According to an initial report, the bus's tire exploded causing the vehicle to crash into a roadside barrier before bursting into flames, which began in the bottom portion of the bus. The driver later added that after the tire malfunctioned, he lost control over the bus and hit a car before scraping against the barrier, causing sparks that ignited the fire.

A survivor said that the doors were not working as passengers tried to flee. A teacher reported that the fire had spread so quickly she did not have time to gather personal belongings, and that some managed to escape through the open door while others jumped out of windows. According to a rescuer, the majority of the bodies were found in the middle and back seats, leading investigators to believe that the fire had started at the front of the bus and the victims had moved away from it.

The bus driver initially fled the scene with authorities being unable to contact him. He turned himself in later that day at a police station in Wiset Chai Chan District, Ang Thong Province. According to CCTV footage, the driver opened the door at the driver's side and ran to open doors on the middle, then the rear of the bus. However, none of the doors could be opened despite his attempts. He eventually ran to the back of the flaming bus and was shown in a TikTok video using a fire extinguisher handed to him by a bystander.

== Victims ==
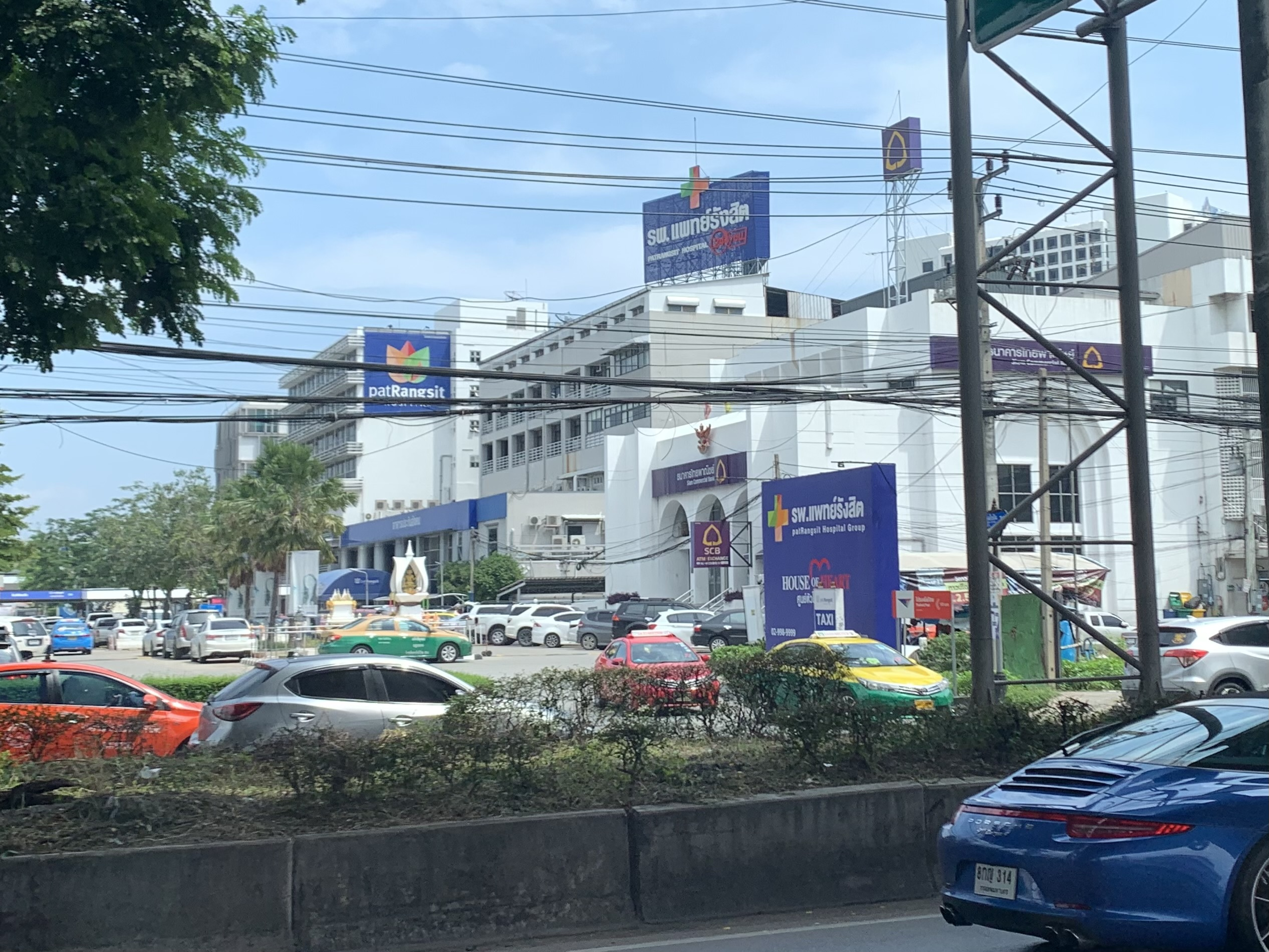
Two injured were treated at Patrangsit Hospital (pictured), a private hospital in Khu Khot

There were twenty-three people confirmed dead at the site of the crash, twenty of them students, three from Prathom [or primary] 1, two from Prathom two, six from Prathom 3, six from Prathom 4, and three from Matthayom [or secondary] 3 grade levels. The remaining three victims were teachers, one of whom was a trainee teacher. Two more fatalities, both of whom were children, in hospital later that day brought the total to twenty-five deaths. The initial 23 fatalities were cremated on 8 October 2024, after a week of traditional funeral ceremonies.

Eight were injured on site; with two taken to Patrangsit Hospital, and the remaining six referred to a local branch of Rajavithi Hospital.

== Investigation ==
The 41-seat bus, with a Sing Buri province 30-0423 licence plate, was registered as a bus-for-hire in February 1970, making it 54 years old at the time of the crash and subsequent fire. Police investigation revealed that the bus was found to be heavily and illegally modified, including a tampered chassis number. Initially built as an Isuzu, it was later refitted into a Mercedes-Benz vehicle. Despite being registered with only six gas tanks, it instead contained 11 gas tanks in total – two at each front wheel; one at each rear wheel; and four in the middle part of the vehicle. The bus operator Chinnabut Tour claimed the vehicle had passed the biannual safety check, as had the rest of its fleet.

The other 5 buses with Sing Buri Province license plate: 30-0357 1st bus in school trip, 30-0411, 30-0412, 30-0427, and 30-0438 3rd bus in school trip. They were assigned to go to Lop Buri (As Lop Buri's Ministry of Transportation contains better tools and equipment for safety checks) for an inspection to check for illegally modified CNG Gas System and other bus requirements but they all fled to Nakhon Ratchasima to uninstall the CNG gas. Police tracked down the 5 remaining buses through GPS and were all apprehended and taken to Sing Buri for a real inspection.

Bus Number 1 (30-0411 Sing Buri) was examined and 6 CNG gas tanks were found meeting the expectations. However, there were 2 window smashers without instructions on how to use and no label on emergency exit door making the bus confiscated. Bus Number 2 (30-0423 Sing Buri) is kept as an evidence as it was the bus that was engulfed in flames. Bus Number 3 (30-0412 Sing Buri) had 11 CNG Tanks (failing to meet expectations) and at the driver's window contained a sticker which said '8 CNG Gas Tanks Installed' while 6 were only allowed according to the regulations. Bus Number 4 (30-0357 Sing Buri) had 11 CNG Tanks and a famous video of officers kicking the emergency doors suggested that the emergency exits is broken making this bus also confiscated. Bus Number 5 (30-0427 Sing Buri) was driven in and 6 CNG Gas Tanks were found. Every single expectations were met. However due to it was one of the company's bus, the bus was still confiscated. Finally, Bus Number 6 (30-0438 Sing Buri) arrived and 9 CNG Tanks were found by authorities. Reporters said Bus Number 3 used tool boxes, tires, and large objects to hide the illegal CNG gases. Additionally researchers found that the reason the bus caught in flames was because of 5 additional CNG Gases with around 875 kg of extra weight pushed the structure down and once it crashed, the structure fell skidding across the road and sparks that ignited the leaking CNG Gas.

Phrommin Kanthiya, head of Office of Network of Accident Prevention under the Department of Disease Control, cited the illegal modification of the half-century-old bus to be the cause. He speculated that the fire was likely caused by a short circuit that sparked a fire at one of the gas tanks illegally installed out of place. This would as well explain the failure of doors to open as reported by the victims.

Charges of negligence were subsequently filed by police against the driver and bus operator.

== Aftermath ==
The bodies of the deceased were returned to their home town, and were received by family members, friends and Buddhist monks at the Wat Khao Phraya Sangkharam, a temple in Uthai Thani province. A mass funeral for the victims was held in Lan Sak on 3 October and was attended by government ministers and a representative of the Thai royal family. A cremation sponsored by King Vajiralongkorn was held on 8 October.

Authorities ordered Chinnabut Tour to have its remaining buses inspected in Lopburi province. However, the firm failed to comply, and the buses were found and seized by police instead at a repair shop in Nakhon Ratchasima province, with their gas canisters already removed.

== Responses ==
Prime Minister Paetongtarn Shinawatra expressed her condolences and plans to visit the victims, clearing her other upcoming schedules.

Many internet users commented on the crash calling for long-distance field trips with young school children to be halted.

Multiple organisations called for safety measures in schoolchild transportation to be reviewed.

The Ministry of Transport ordered all 13,000 buses that run on natural gas in Thailand to renew a safety check within two months of the disaster. Deputy minister Surapong Piyachote also suggested a ban on buses that run on natural gas. Transport Minister Suriya Juangroongruangkit announced the creation of a special committee to look into road safety following the disaster.

The bus operator Chinnabut Tour was ordered to suspend its entire operations.

Google ranked the event as the first most searched term by Thais in 2024 in the category of domestic news.

== See also ==
- List of transportation fires
