= Vietnam Airlines Flight 831 =

1988 aviation accident

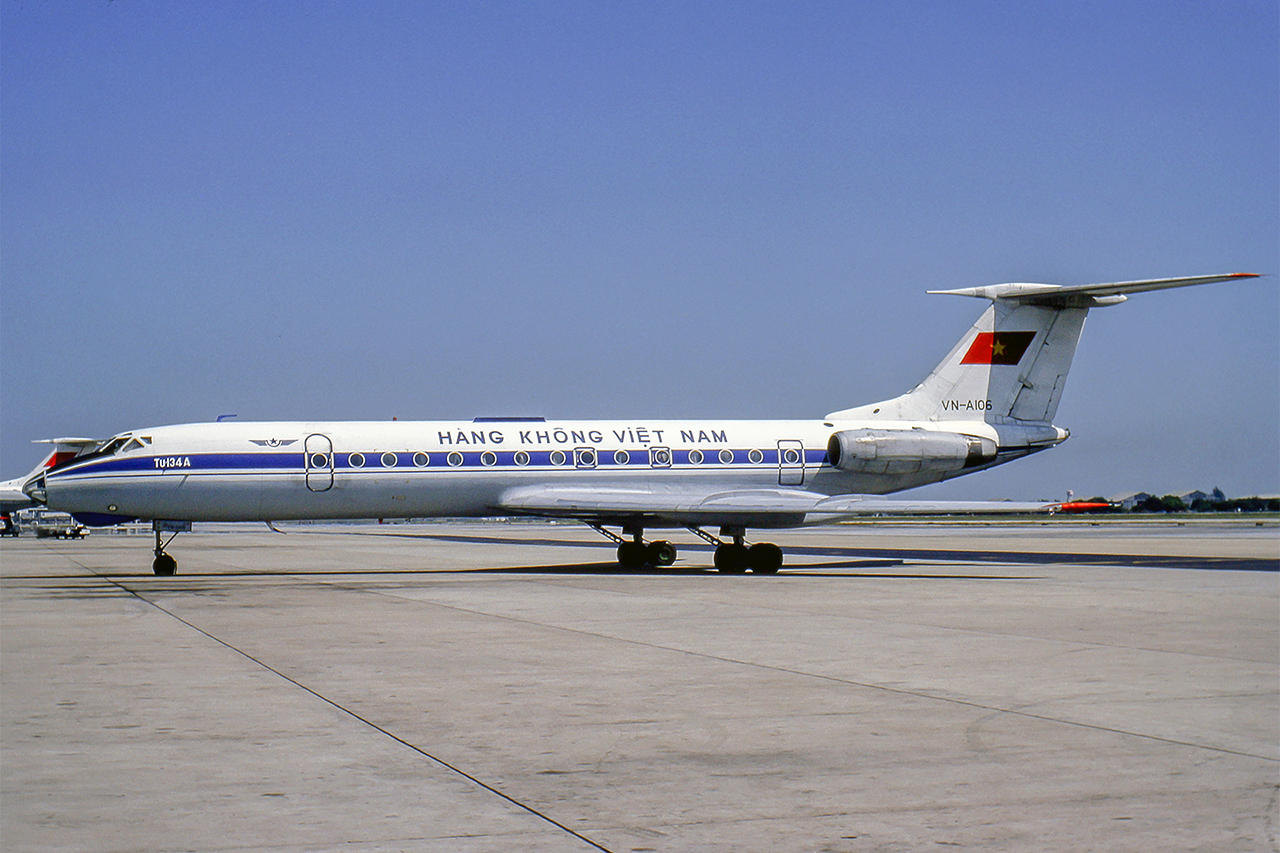
- A Vietnam Airlines Tupolev Tu-134 similar to the aircraft involved

Accident
- Date: 9 September 1988
- Summary: CFIT for reasons unknown, possibly due to a lightning strike
- Site: Near Semafahkarm Village, Tambon Khu Khot, Amphoe Lam Luk Ka, Pathum Thani, Thailand; 13°57′49″N 100°38′36″E

Aircraft
- Aircraft type: Tupolev Tu-134
- Operator: Vietnam Airlines
- Call sign: VIET NAM AIRLINES 831
- Registration: VN-A102
- Flight origin: Hanoi International Airport
- Destination: Don Mueang International Airport
- Occupants: 90
- Passengers: 84
- Crew: 6
- Fatalities: 76
- Injuries: 14
- Survivors: 14

Vietnam Airlines Flight 831, a Tupolev Tu-134, crashed in a rice field 6 kilometres (3.7 miles) N of Bangkok International Airport, while operating a flight from Hanoi, Vietnam to Bangkok, Thailand, on 9 September 1988. The cause of the accident is undetermined; however, the pilots reported the aircraft may have been struck by lightning as it approached to land. Three crew and 73 passengers died in the accident, whilst 14 others survived, including the captain, flight engineer, and one stewardess. This accident was the second deadliest accident (behind Thai Airways Flight 365 a year earlier) at the time in Thailand, and is currently the fifth deadliest.

== Victims ==
=== Crew members ===
Captain: Khong Dinh Phuong

Navigator: Tran Dinh Hong

Flight engineer: Le Viet Dong

Stewardess: Hoa Xuan Ly

Stewardess: Ha Minh Hong

Stewardess: Nguyen Thai Thuy

=== Passengers ===
It was initially reported that 75 passengers were on board instead of 84.

Among the dead was Vietnamese Minister of Public Health Đặng Hồi Xuân, Indian ambassador Arun Padwardhan and Japanese secretary Kiyokata Ida.

== Accident ==
After entering the Thai area, the weather began deteriorating, with heavy rain. Near Don Mueang Airport, the navigator shouted: "Lightning, it's lightning". However, no warnings were made, so they continued their descent. When the aircraft descended to 380 meters (1,250 feet), light flashed, incapitating the cabin crews. Passing above the outer marker, the aircraft descended below the minimum safe altitude and crashed into the ground. The aircraft exploded on impact with debris spread over 500 metres (1,600 ft).The plane broke into three parts: The nose section, the first-half fuselage and the rest.

In 2013, in an interview, captain Phuong said his fortune toward his miracle survival, but also express regrets and sadness for not having a safe flight. "I wished my luck had been given to someone else on this fateful flight!" - said captain Phuong

== Investigation ==
Subsequently, the black box was recovered. International aviation investigators and Russian experts analyzed the cause of the crash, attributing it to a lightning strike. While aircraft can often withstand minor lightning strikes, there are severe incidents from which recovery is impossible. Captain Phuong recounted that in this particular accident, the flight crew lost consciousness the moment the lightning struck; there was no further input from the pilots on the controls during those critical moments. Following the strike, the black box recorded no words from the crew.
