= Smitthiphat Leenawarat =

Thai politician

- สมิทธิพัฒน์ หลีนวรัตน์

Member of the Thanyaburi District Municipal Council
- Elect
- Assumed office TBD

Personal details
- Parent(s): Krissada Leenawarat (father); Yuppawao Leenawarat (mother)

Smitthiphat Leenawarat (Thai: สมิทธิพัฒน์ หลีนวรัตน์, RTGS: Samitthiphat Linawarat) is a Thai politician, serving as the member-elect of the Thanyaburi district Municipal Council in Pathum Thani province since May 2025.

== Early life and education ==
Smitthiphat is the son of Krissada Leenawarat, a prominent Pathum Thani politician and former mayor of the Thanyaburi subdistrict municipality, along with his brother, who is a current Pheu Thai MP. His mother Yuppawao is also a member of the Thanyaburi Municipal Council.

== 2025 Pathum Thani crash ==
On 16 April 2025, Smitthiphat was driving on Bangkok's eastern outer ring road in Pathum Thani province and crashed into a pickup truck, severely injuring two passengers. He was charged with reckless driving and driving without a valid license. The case remains under investigation.

The response to Smitthiphat's case drew criticism as a result of his family ties to politicians, including current Prime Minister Paetongtarn Shinawatra, and her father, former Prime Minister Thaksin Shinawatra. Deputy Prime Minister Anutin Charnvirakul stated that if Smitthiphat were found to have broken the law, he would face consequences.

== 2025 election ==
In May 2025, Smitthiphat was elected to the Thanyaburi Subdistrict Municipal Council, along with his mother and father.
