= Superhighway =

Superhighway can refer to:

- Highways designed for high-speed traffic
  - Controlled-access highway, a highway with all cross-traffic grade separated
- Information superhighway, a term for the internet
- Vibhavadi Rangsit Road, a road that was known as Superhighway Road
