= Rittiyawannalai School =

- โรงเรียนฤทธิยะวรรณาลัย
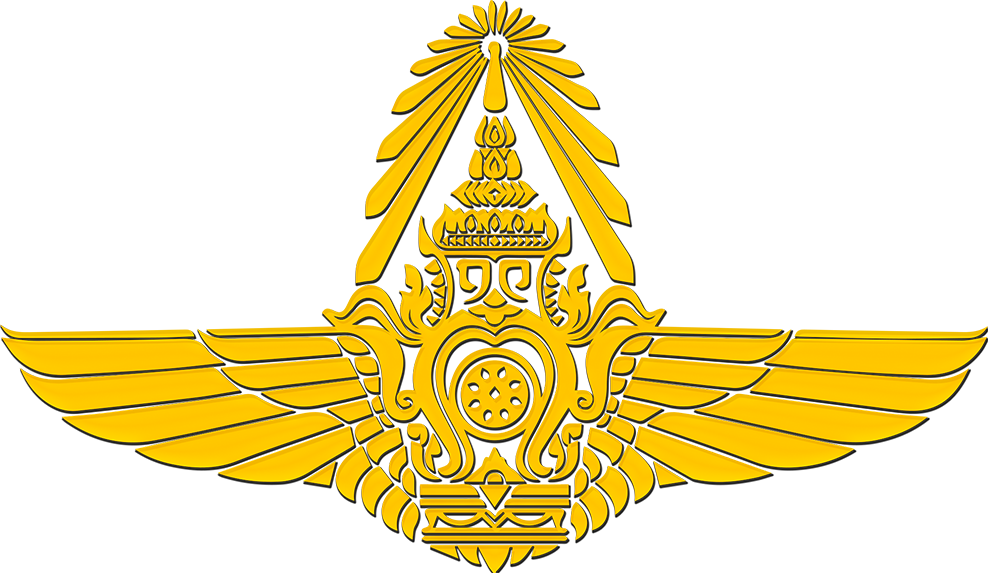

Location
- 171/3151 Phahonyothin Road, Sai Mai, Bangkok 10220; Thailand
- Coordinates: 13.913108°N 100.625312°E

Information
- Type: Public
- Established: 18 September 1947; 77 Years ago
- Founder: Air Marshal Luong-Thevalit Punluk
- Director: Thanyawit Trairattan
- Grades: 1–12
- Enrollment: 4,200
- Colors: Blue and yellow
- Song: Rittiyawannalai March
- Website: www.rittiya.ac.th

Rittiyawannalai School (Rit-ti-ya-wan-na-lai) (Thai: โรงเรียนฤทธิยะวรรณาลัย) is a public secondary school, elementary school (Grades 1–12) and nursery school in Bangkok, Thailand . It was established by Air Marshal Luong-Thevalit Punluk on 18 September 1947.

== Overview ==
- Address : 171/3151 Phahonyothin Road, Sai Mai, Bangkok 10220
- Abbreviation : R.W. (ฤ.ว)
- Motto : ปญฺญา นรานํ รตนํ ปัญญาเป็นแก้วอันประเสริฐของคนดี or The wisdom is a thing of the good man.
- Colors : Blue and yellow (colors of the Royal Thai Air Force)
- Song : March Rittiyawannalai

== History ==
Rittiyawannalai school was established by Air Marshal Luong-Thevalit Punluk in 1947 for educating military dependent children and people who live around the military base. Ritiya-wannarai was supported by the military. In 1978, the high school section was transferred the responsibility from air force to the Ministry of Education.

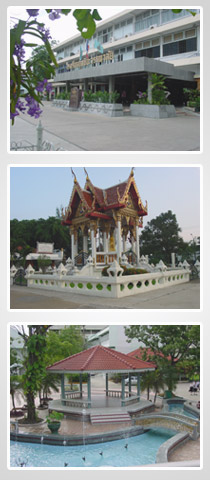
Rittiyawannalai location

== Rittiya schools ==
- Rittiyawannalai School (secondary school)
- Rittiyawannalai2 School (secondary school)
- Rittiyawannalai School (elementary school)
- Rittiyawannalai nursery school

== Curriculum, grades 7-12 ==
GRADE 7-9

- Science-Mathematics (Academic Olympiad) (1-2)
- Science-Mathematics-Physical (CADET)(3)
- English Program (EP)(4)
- Intensive Chinese Program (ICP)(5)
- Science-Mathematics And Artificial Intelligence (S-MAI)
- Normal Room (6-17)

GRADE 10-12

- Science-Mathematics (GIFTED)(1)
- Pre Engineering (PE)(2)
- English Program (EP)(3)
- Science-Mathematics (SM)(4-9)
- Mathematics-English (ME)(10-11)
- English-English (EE)(12)
- English-Japan and English-French (EJ/EF)(13)
- English-China (ECH)(14)
- Thai-Social (TS)(15)
- Business-Technology and English-French (BT/EF)(16)

== Traditions ==
- Colours Sport
- Student's Drama at Rittiya Hall
- Rittiya Music Awards
- Student Road Show
- Science Week
- Foreign Language Week
- Respect Teachers
- Big Cleaning Day

== Colours party ==
- Chiang San (Yellow)
- Sukhothai (Pink)
- U Thong (Green)
- Ayutthaya (Orange)
- Rattanakosin (Violet)

== See also ==
- List of schools in Thailand
