= National Memorial (Thailand) =

Thai museum

Coordinates: 13.9521°N 100.6211°E

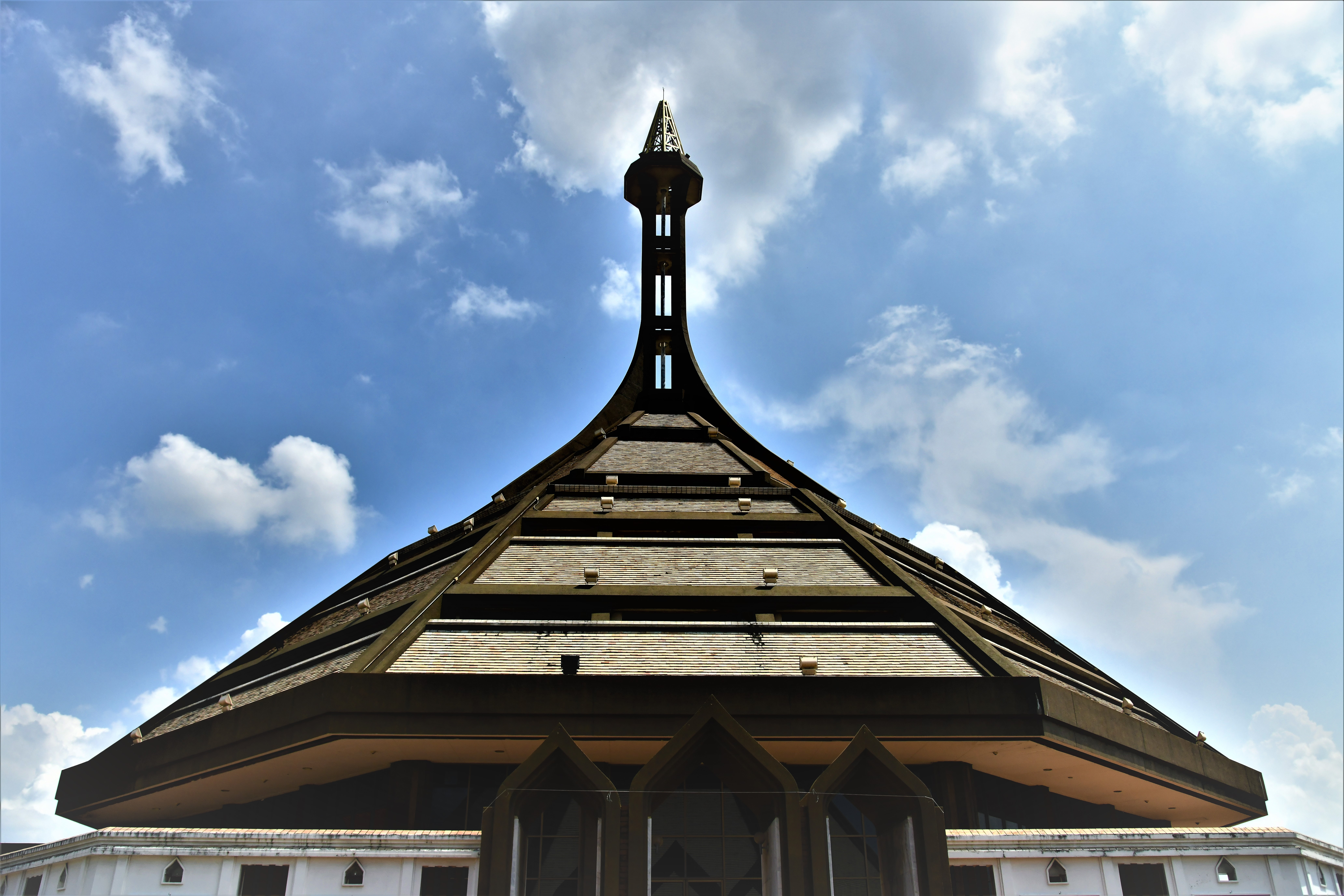
The National Memorial of Thailand, Lam Luk Ka District, Pathum Thani Province.

The Thai National Memorial was built for the 200th Anniversary of the Rattanakosin celebration as a memorial to the Great King in the past, and the Thai people who sacrificed their lives for the nation. The memorial is located in Khu Khot sub-district, Lam Luk Ka District, Pathum Thani Province where Vibhavadi Rangsit Road and Phahonyothin Road connected.

== Objectives ==
- Commemorate the sacrifices for the nation and honor the brave men forever.
- Show the history of the battle.
- Remind the public of the past and the effect on the security of the National Institute of Religion and the King.
- Provide a place to study, learn and relax.

== Showcase ==
Thai national memorial is separated into 5 sections

=== Ceremonial Ground ===
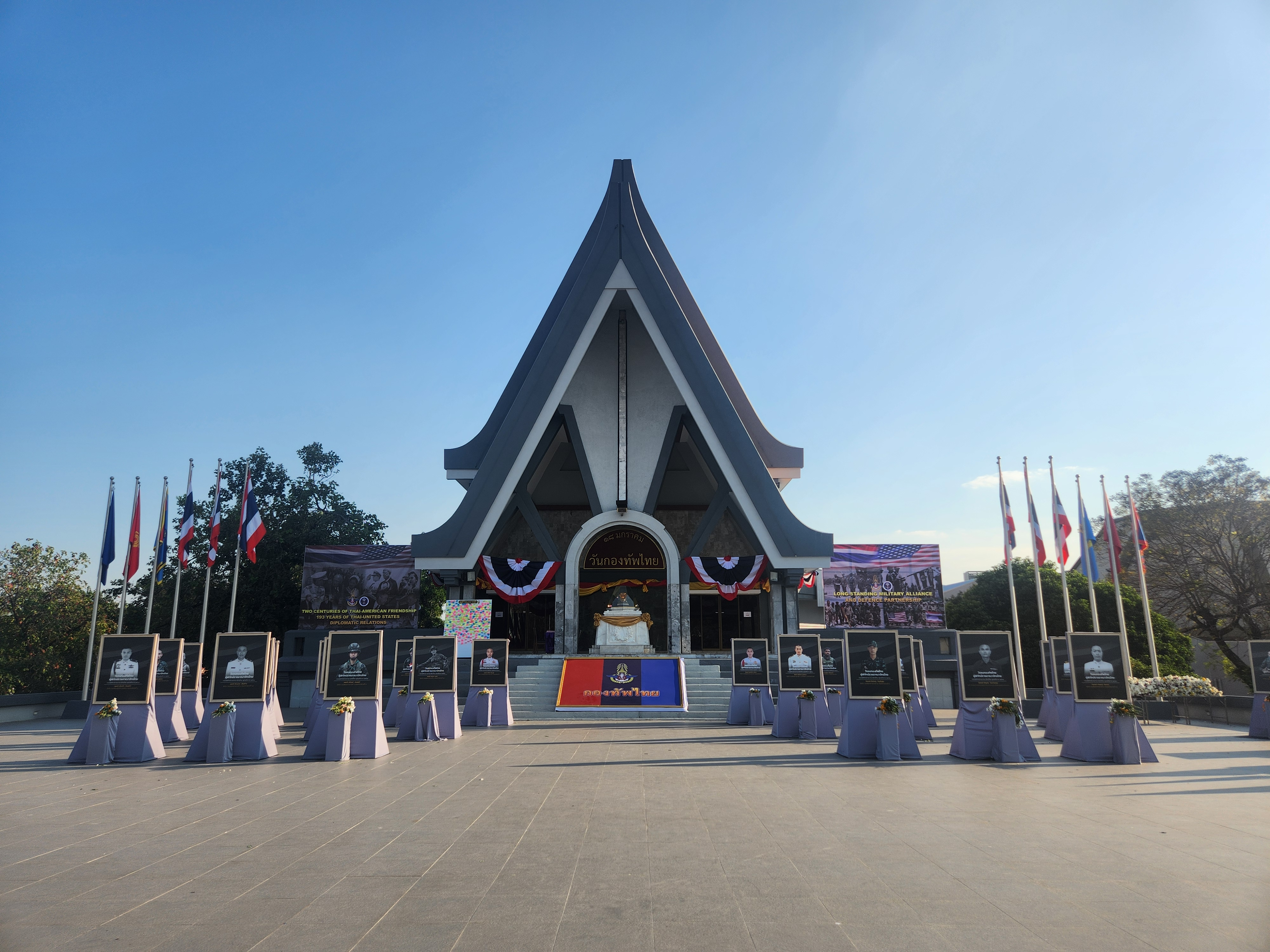
The Ceremonial Ground.

The Ceremonial Ground is a space for the Honor Guard or national and international visitors. It is also used to place wreaths in various ceremonies on the ground decorated with the flags of the Royal Thai Armed Forces, the flag of the Royal Thai Police and flag of the Volunteer Defense Corps. The side is adorned with the Thai flag and with the national flag of a visitor.

=== Ceremonial building ===
The building was completed in November 1990 and separated into 4 floors.

==== Floor 1 ====
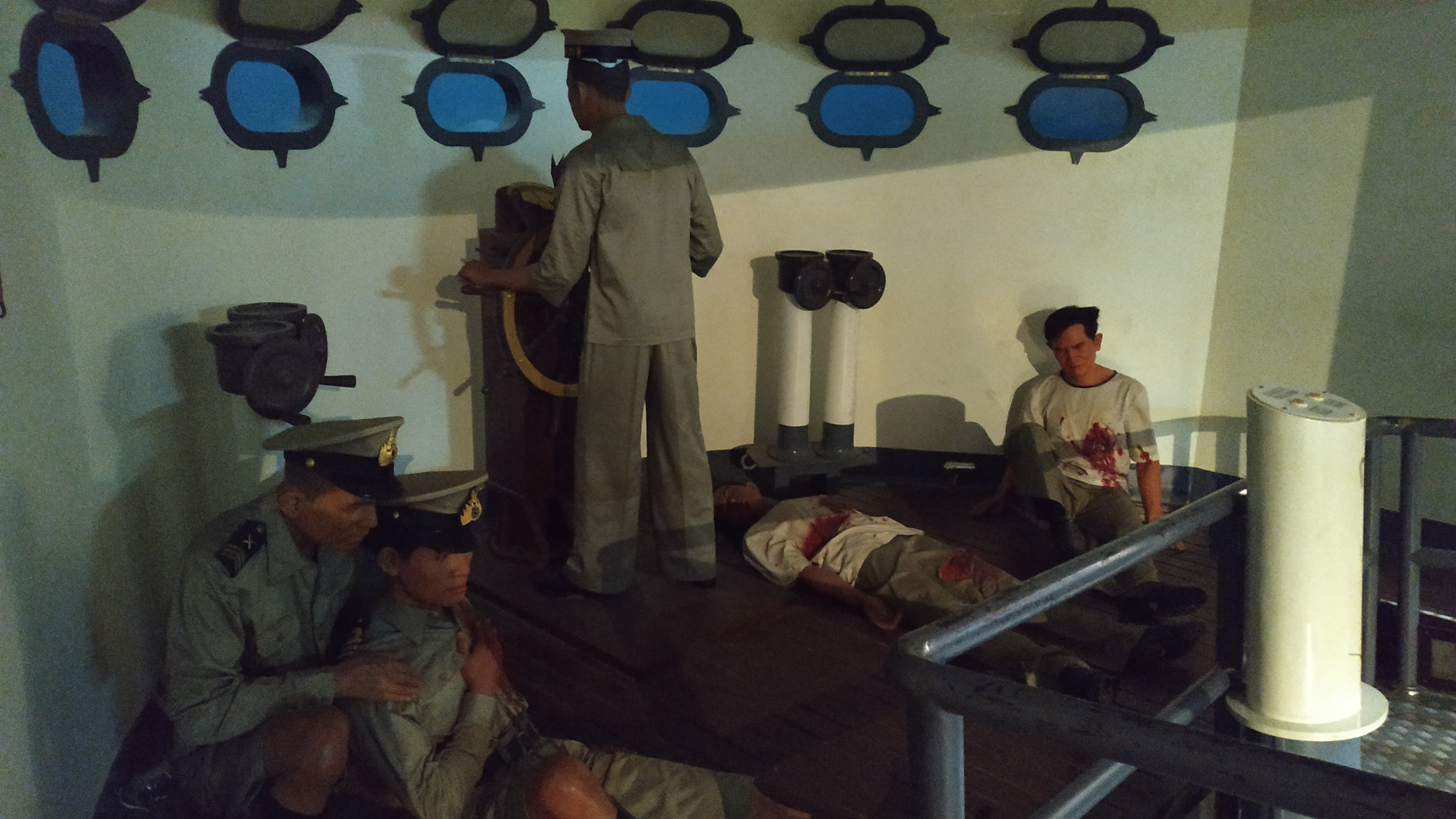
Diorama shown inside HTMS Thonburi during the Battle of Koh Chang

The first floor hosts the Hall of Honor of Her Majesty Queen Sirikit. It commends the honor and heroism of the military, police and civilian combatants that have been awarded the Ramathibodi and other medals.

- World War I simulation event: Thai troops parade through the archway in Paris.
- Indochina dispute simulation: Battle of Koh Chang
- Pacific War simulation event: Flying Squadron 5
- Korean War simulation event: Battle of Pork Chop Hill
- Vietnam War simulation event: War in a Vietnam forest

==== Floor 2 ====
The glass wall around the balcony was inscribed with the men who died from the battle.

==== Floor 3 ====
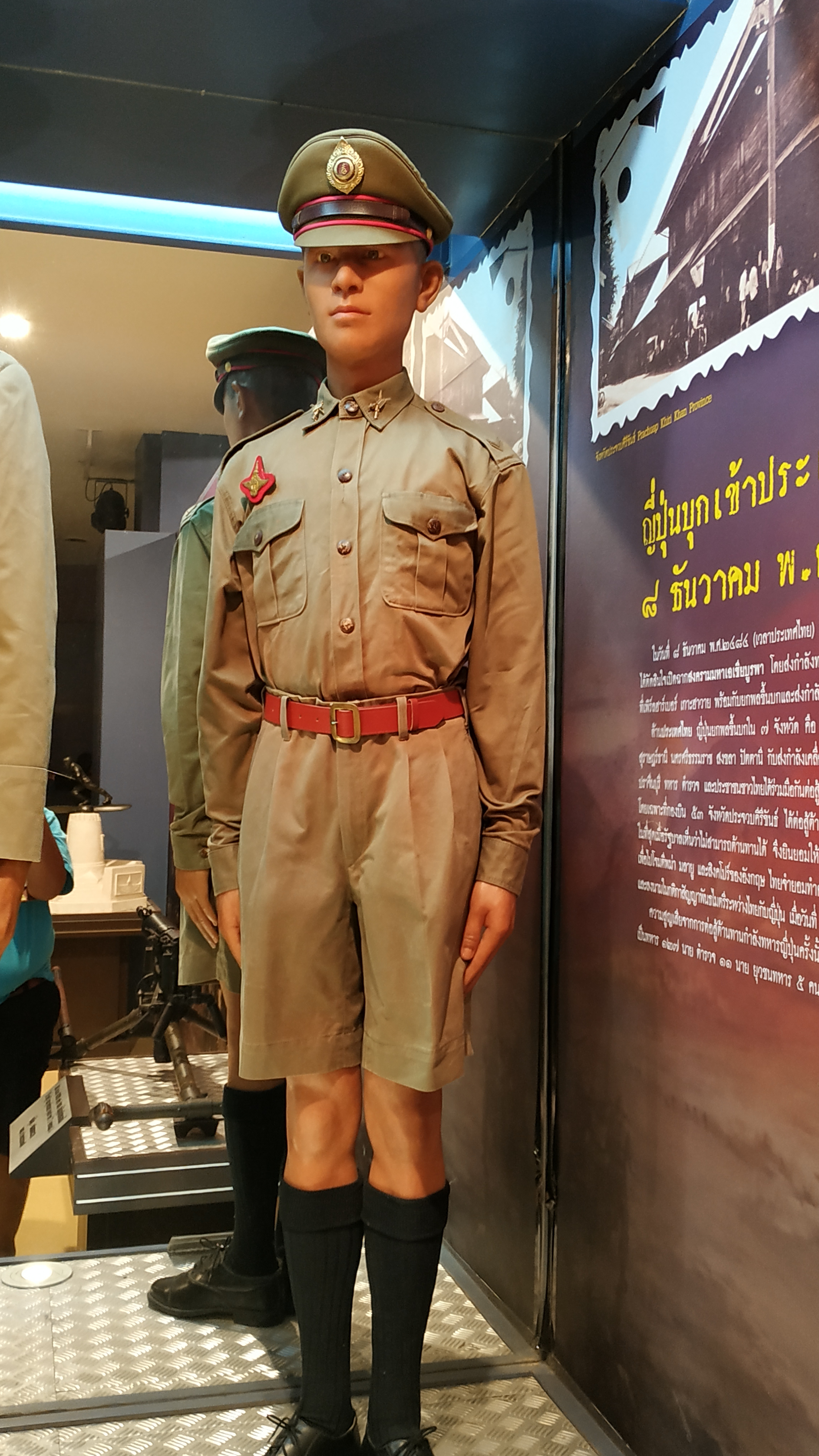
Uniform of the Thai Junior Soldier in World War II

This floor contains models of historical events.

==== Floor 4 ====
A uniform display marks ranks and the components of the military uniform.

- The uniform display is divided into 6 exhibitions: Early Sukhothai period, Sukhothai period, Ayutthaya period, Thonburi period, early Rattanakosin period and modern era, including 15 models.
- It displays uniform components, such as the front of the shoulder strap.
- It displays four fully dressed mannequins, one each for the Army, Naval, Air force and Police.
- A data presentation with computational and videotape support. It shows the ranks and uniforms of military police.

Military History and Museum Building

=== Military history and museum building ===
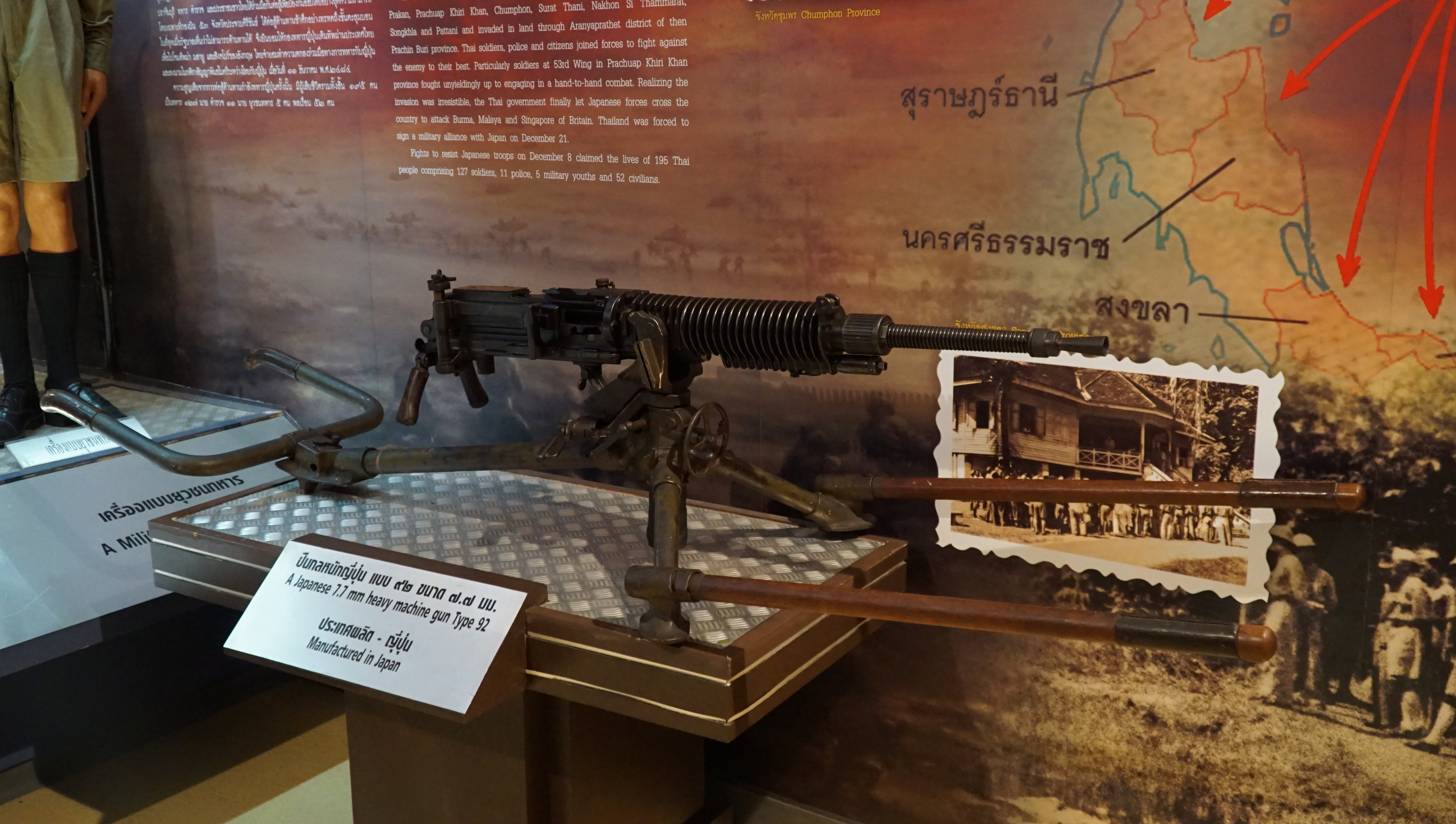
Type 92 heavy machine gun in National Memorial

The building looks like a fortress with an ancient tower. The front of this building is the shrine of King Chulalongkorn with Thai army members standing in military uniform. Army field marshals’ names are engraved on the marble within historic buildings and a military museum.

=== Panoramic Display ===
This building is octagonal. The inner wall is curved in a circle. A 4.30 meter by 90 meter painting is installed. It was done by Preecha Thao-thong, a national artist, with students from Silpakorn University and Rangsit University. It shows the historical events of Thailand from past to present to represent the wisdom of the king. It includes the sacrifices of the ancestors. It is dedicated to protecting and preserving national independence.

The painting is separated into 10 parts, arranged by era:

- Establishment
- Evolution
- 1st Independence and Salvage independence
- Civilization
- 2nd Independence
- 2nd salvage independence and Established the capital of Thonburi
- Established the capital of Rattanakosin
- Song kram kao thap (Nine Armies' Wars)
- Rescued from colonization
- Entering a new era

=== Outdoor museum and landscape architecture ===
The outside area is separated into two parts:

==== Outdoor museum ====
- Multi-functional area
- A fence sits between Vibhavadi Rangsit Road and Phaholyothin Road
- Guardrooms are on 4 sides of entrance and exit)

==== Landscape architecture ====
- Light tank type 95 HA – GO
- T - 28 D plane
- 13 Helicopters
- LVT car
- Boat inspectors river
- Light Tank, Carden Loyd Mark VI, Modified
- Type 63 Mountain gun
- M41 light tank
