= Khlong Thanon subdistrict =

Khlong Thanon คลองถนน
- Khwaeng
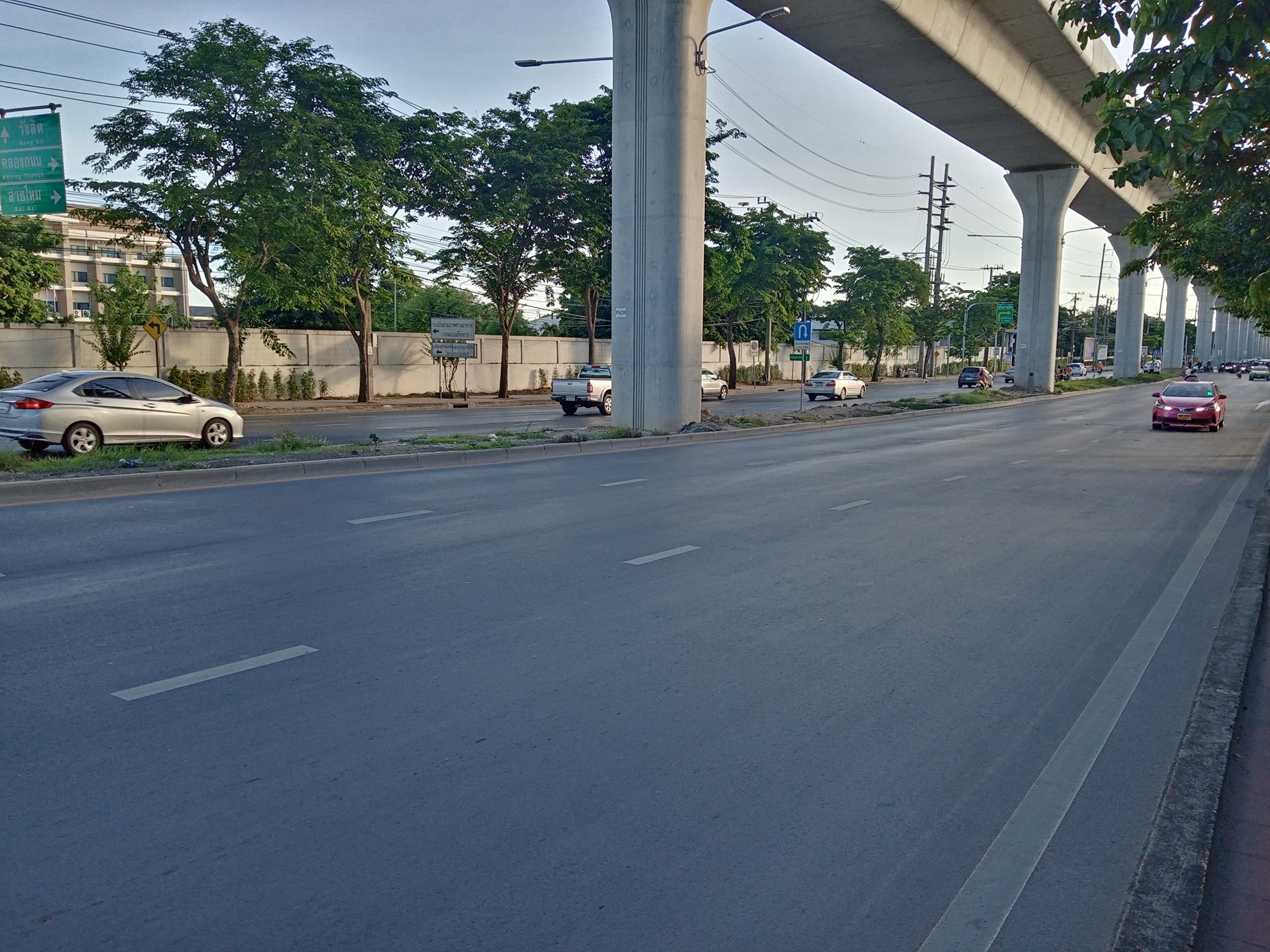
- Phahonyothin rd (Highway 1) in the area of Khlong Thanon (mid-2020)

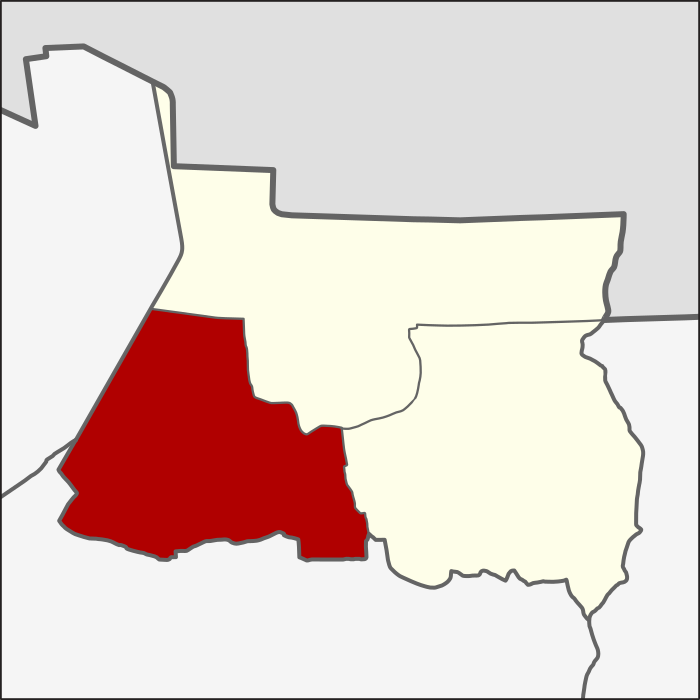
- Location in Sai Mai District
- Country: Thailand
- Province: Bangkok
- Khet: Sai Mai

Area
  - Total: 12.440 km^{2} (4.803 sq mi)

Population (2020)
  - Total: 85,149
- Time zone: UTC+7 (ICT)
- Postal code: 10220
- TIS 1099: 104203

Khlong Thanon (Thai: คลองถนน, pronounced [kʰlɔ̄ːŋ tʰā.nǒn]) is a khwaeng (subdistrict) of Sai Mai District, in Bangkok, Thailand. In 2020, it had a total population of 85,149 people.
