= Prachathipat =

Prachathipat ประชาธิปัตย์
- Tambon
- Prachathipat
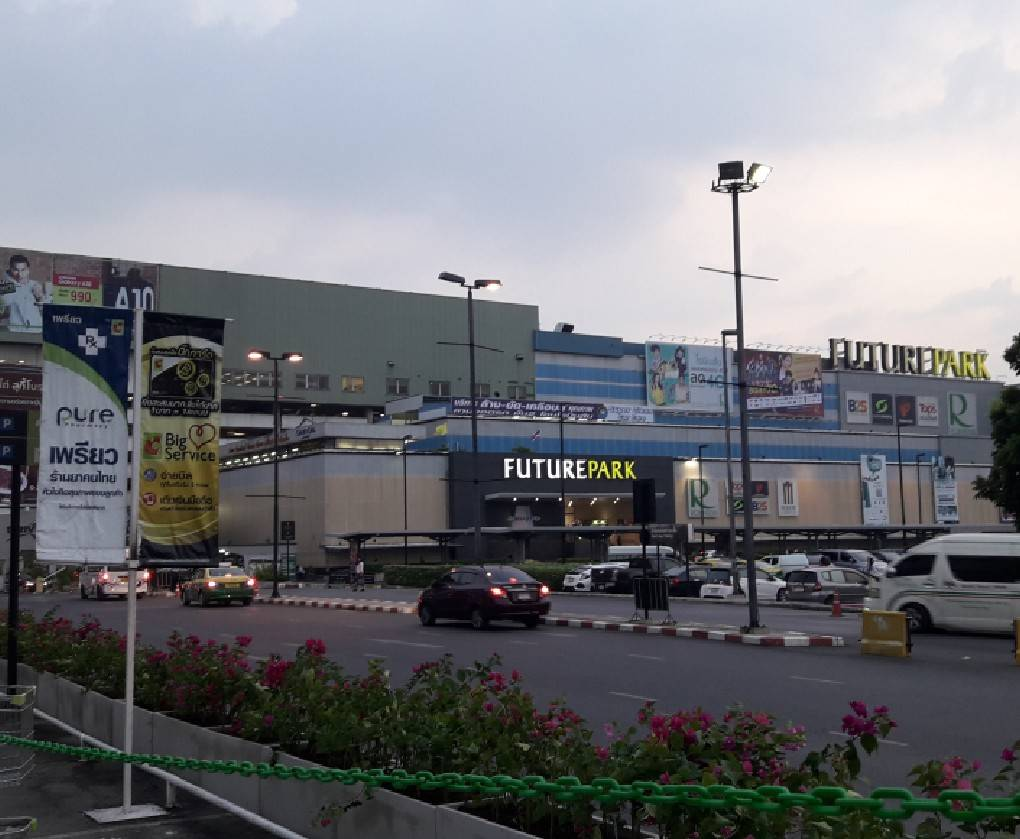
- Future Park Rangsit, one of local landmarks

- Location in Bangkok Metropolitan Region
- Coordinates: 13°59′19.0″N 100°38′14.0″E
- Country: Thailand
- Province: Pathum Thani
- District: Thanyaburi

Government
  - Type: City Municipality

Population (2021)
  - Total: 84,384
- Time zone: UTC+7 (ICT)
- Postcode: 12130
- Area code: (+66) 02

Prachathipat (Thai: ประชาธิปัตย์; RTGS: Prachathipat) is a tambon (subdistrict) of Thanyaburi District in Pathum Thani Province on northern outskirts Bangkok. It is administered by Rangsit City Municipality.

== History ==
Originally, Prachathipat had the status of the municipality of Prachathipat subdistrict depends on Thanyaburi District. There were a total of six mubans (villages).

It was formerly known as "Bueng Thalesap" (บึงทะเลสาบ, "lake swamp") It was renamed to Prachathipat as at the present time there is no definite evidence.

However, Phahonyothin Road (Highway 1), one of Thailand's four main highways leading to the north, also passes here. It was originally referred to informally as "Pao Road" (ถนนเป้า) and has since become Prachathipat Road.

Before in 1949, it was renamed Phaholyothin Road. In honour of Gen Phraya Phahonphonphayuhasena 2nd Prime Minister of Thailand and the Head of the Khana Ratsadon (People's Party), the political group that played a main role in the 1932 Siamese Revolution.

As time passed, the progress in various processes of the local area has increased both economically and politically. As a result, the Rangsit City Municipality was established in order to conform to the name that is generally known without causing confusion in contacting the government, as well as in accordance with the will of the locals. Prachathipat became part of the administrative areas of Rangsit ever since.
