= Sai Mai district =

Sai Mai สายไหม
- Khet
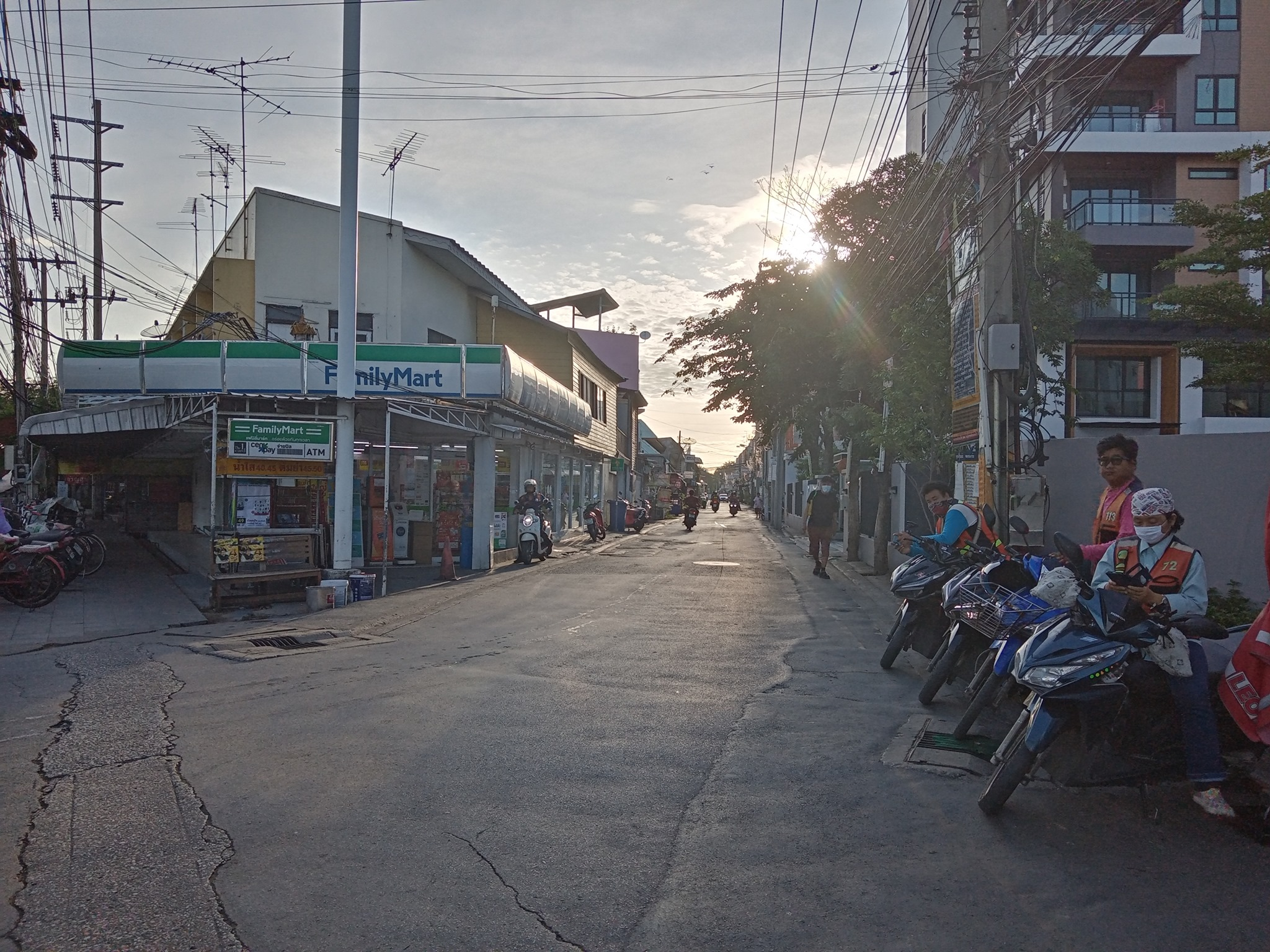
- Soi Phahon Yothin 54, Khlong Thanon, Sai Mai

- Khet location in Bangkok
- Coordinates: 13°55′9″N 100°38′45″E
- Country: Thailand
- Province: Bangkok
- Seat: O Ngoen
- Khwaeng: 3
- District established: 21 November 1997

Area
  - Total: 44.615 km^{2} (17.226 sq mi)

Population (2022)
  - Total: 208,928
  - Density: 4,682.91/km^{2} (12,128.7/sq mi)
- Time zone: UTC+7 (ICT)
- Postal code: 10220
- Geocode: 1042

Sai Mai (Thai: สายไหม, pronounced [sǎːj mǎj]) is one of the 50 districts (khet) of Bangkok, Thailand. It is bounded by (from north clockwise): Lam Luk Ka district of Pathum Thani province; Khlong Sam Wa, Bang Khen and Don Mueang of Bangkok.

== History ==
Sai Mai was the name of a muban (village) in tambon (sub-district) Khu Khot, Lam Luk Ka District, Pathum Thani Province. It was transferred to Bang Khen district and promoted to subdistrict (tambon) in 1940. Due to the growth of population in the area, Sai Mai was elevated to district status effective 21 November 1997 to improve service and administration.

The name of the village, "Sai Mai" (which can be interpreted as "late or not?"), is believed to have come from a common question in the past. Because the area was once so far from downtown, people often asked, "Will we be late getting here ?" The name has no connection to the sweet snack roti sai mai.

The dominant feature of the district is Khlong (canal) Lat Phrao. The canal is thought to have been dug in the early period of the Rattanakosin Kingdom (1782–1932). Khlong Lat Phrao is one of nine canals in Bangkok that drains rainwater flowing into the city from northern Thailand, but it has been neglected for decades and clogged with refuse. In January 2016, 1.6 billion baht was allocated to rehabilitate the canal, widen it to 38 metres and deepen it to four metres. Construction is to be completed by June 2019.

== Administration ==
The district is divided into three sub-districts (khwaeng).

No.	Name	Thai	Area (km^{2})	Map
1.	Sai Mai	สายไหม	18.659	Map
2.	O Ngoen	ออเงิน	13.516	Map
3.	Khlong Thanon	คลองถนน	12.440	Map
Total			44.615	Map

== Places ==
- Bhumibol Adulyadej Hospital
- Navaminda Kasatriyadhiraj Royal Thai Air Force Academy
- Rittiyawannalai School
- Saphan Mai

== Transportation ==
There are three BTS Skytrain Sukhumvit line stations in Sai Mai: Bhumibol Adulyadej Hospital, Royal Thai Air Force Museum, and Yaek Kor Por Aor. All stations are on the Phahonyothin Road, the westside border to Don Mueang district.
