= Bueng Yitho =

Bueng Yitho บึงยี่โถ
- Town Municipality
- Location in Bangkok Metropolitan Region
- Coordinates: 13°59′42.0″N 100°40′7.3″E
- Country: Thailand
- Province: Pathum Thani
- District: Thanyaburi

Population (2018)
  - Total: 32,321
- Time zone: UTC+7 (ICT)
- Area code: (+66) 2

Bueng Yitho (Thai: บึงยี่โถ) is a town (Thesaban Mueang) located in the Thanyaburi District (Amphoe) of Pathum Thani Province in the Bangkok Metropolitan Region of Central Thailand. In 2018, it had a total population of 32,321 people.
