= Mae Kha Subdistrict (50091100) =

Mae Kha แม่ข่า
- Tambon
- Interactive map of Mae Kha
- Coordinates: 19.786583°N 99.163095°E
- Country: Thailand
- Province: Chiang Mai
- District: Fang
- Time zone: UTC+7 (ICT)
- Postal code: 50320

Mae Kha (Thai: แม่ข่า) is a tambon (subdistrict) in Fang District, Chiang Mai Province, northern Thailand. The area consists of lowland plains and foothills. Agriculture, trading and general employment are among the main occupations of local residents. Local administration is divided between two subdistrict municipalities: Mae Kha Subdistrict Municipality and Ban Mae Kha Subdistrict Municipality.

== History ==
The area now known as Mae Kha was formerly part of Mae Ngon Subdistrict in Fang District, Chiang Mai Province. Mae Kha was originally the name of a village within Mae Ngon before the area was separated and established as a distinct subdistrict.

The name Mae Kha is derived from the name of a local watercourse that flows through the community. In the past, the waterway was an important source of water for local residents, serving domestic and agricultural purposes as well as the transportation of goods, including forest products, vegetables and bamboo.

According to a study of the area's history, Mae Kha initially consisted of eight villages, with five additional villages established later, bringing the total to 13 villages.

== Administrative divisions ==
Mae Kha has 11 villages according to the administrative information provided. The area is served by two local government organisations:

- Mae Kha Subdistrict Municipality
- Ban Mae Kha Subdistrict Municipality

Mae Kha Subdistrict Municipality is responsible for most of the subdistrict, while Ban Mae Kha Subdistrict Municipality administers parts of Village No. 1, Ban Sop Kha, and Village No. 5, Ban Mae Kha.

=== Villages ===
The villages in Mae Kha are listed as follows:

1. Ban Sop Kha (Village No. 1)
2. Ban Dong Pa Sak (Village No. 2)
3. Ban San Muang (Village No. 3)
4. Ban Huai Jo (Village No. 4)
5. Ban Mae Kha (Village No. 5)
6. Ban Lai Fang (Village No. 6)
7. Ban San Ton Pao (Village No. 7)
8. Ban Den Wiang Chai (Village No. 8)
9. Ban San Pa Nai (Village No. 9)
10. Ban Mai Lai Fang (Village No. 10)
11. Ban Nong Om (Village No. 11)
12. Ban Mittraphap (Village No. 12)
13. Ban Huai Jo Tai (Village No. 13)

== Local government ==
The area of Mae Kha is administered by two local government organisations: Mae Kha Subdistrict Municipality and Ban Mae Kha Subdistrict Municipality. Their administrative boundaries include parts of villages shared between the two municipalities.

=== Mae Kha Subdistrict Municipality ===
Mae Kha Municipality building

Mae Kha Subdistrict Municipality is a local government organisation in Fang District, Chiang Mai Province. It is responsible for most of the area within Mae Kha Subdistrict.

==== History ====
The local administration of Mae Kha was originally organised as the Mae Kha Subdistrict Administrative Organisation (SAO). It was subsequently upgraded to municipal status as Mae Kha Subdistrict Municipality.

==== Administrative area ====
Mae Kha Subdistrict Municipality covers approximately 91.46 square kilometres. It has full administrative responsibility for the following 11 villages:

1. Ban Dong Pa Sak (Village No. 2)
2. Ban San Muang (Village No. 3)
3. Ban Huai Jo (Village No. 4)
4. Ban Lai Fang (Village No. 6)
5. Ban San Ton Pao (Village No. 7)
6. Ban Den Wiang Chai (Village No. 8)
7. Ban San Pa Nai (Village No. 9)
8. Ban Mai Lai Fang (Village No. 10)
9. Ban Nong Om (Village No. 11)
10. Ban Mittraphap (Village No. 12)
11. Ban Huai Jo Tai (Village No. 13)

In addition, parts of Ban Sop Kha and Ban Mae Kha are also within the municipality's administrative boundary.

==== Population ====
Population and household figures by village within Mae Kha Subdistrict Municipality are presented below. The figures include the 11 villages located entirely within the municipality and portions of two additional villages.

Population and households in Mae Kha Subdistrict Municipality
Village No.	Village	Population			households
Village No.	Village	Male	Female	Total	households
2	Ban Dong Pa Sak	372	408	780	164
3	Ban San Muang	443	448	891	246
4	Ban Huai Jo	250	267	517	154
6	Ban Lai Fang	612	615	1,227	320
7	Ban San Ton Pao	356	363	791	205
8	Ban Den Wiang Chai	389	441	830	180
9	Ban San Pa Nai	210	224	434	134
10	Ban Mai Lai Fang	350	387	737	246
11	Ban Nong Om	217	198	415	141
12	Ban Mittraphap	272	270	542	168
13	Ban Huai Jo Tai	105	246	451	150
1	Ban Sop Kha	10	17	27	9
5	Ban Mae Kha	32	33	65	28
Total (as reported in the original source)		3,618	3,917	7,707	2,145

Source: Population and household information by village in Mae Kha Subdistrict.

=== Ban Mae Kha Subdistrict Municipality ===
Ban Mae Kha Municipality building

Ban Mae Kha Subdistrict Municipality is another local government organisation located within Mae Kha Subdistrict, Fang District, Chiang Mai Province.

==== History ====
The municipality was originally established as Ban Mae Kha Sanitary District under a Ministry of Interior announcement dated 22 April 1992. It was subsequently upgraded to a subdistrict municipality under the legislation governing the conversion of sanitary districts into municipalities.

==== Administrative area ====
Ban Mae Kha Subdistrict Municipality is responsible for parts of Village No. 1, Ban Sop Kha, and Village No. 5, Ban Mae Kha. These areas form part of the administrative territory shared with Mae Kha Subdistrict Municipality.

The municipal office is located at 199, Village No. 5, Mae Kha Subdistrict, Fang District, Chiang Mai Province.

==== Population ====
According to the local civil registration office of Ban Mae Kha Subdistrict Municipality, as of 30 June 2016, the municipality had a total population of 2,001, comprising 980 males and 1,021 females. The average population density was 788 people per square kilometre, and there were 853 households.

Population and households of Ban Mae Kha Subdistrict Municipality, 2016
Administrative area	Male	Female	Total population	households	Population density (people/km²)
Ban Mae Kha Subdistrict Municipality	980	1,021	2,001	853	788

Source: Local civil registration office, Ban Mae Kha Subdistrict Municipality, 30 June 2016.
