= Vibhavadi Rangsit Road =

Highway in Bangkok, Thailand

National Highway 31
- ทางหลวงแผ่นดินหมายเลข 31

Route information
- Length: 28.5 km (17.7 mi)
- Existed: 1966–present

Major junctions
- From: Tai Duan Din Daeng Intersection in Din Daeng, Bangkok
- To: National Memorial Intersection, Khu Khot, Lam Luk Ka, Pathum Thani

Location
- Country: Thailand

Highway system
- Highways in Thailand; Motorways; Asian Highways

Vibhavadi Rangsit Road (Thai: ถนนวิภาวดีรังสิต, RTGS: Thanon Wiphawadi Rangsit, also called Vibhavadi Road (ถนนวิภาวดี) or Vibha (วิภาฯ)) or Highway 31, is a highway in Thailand. It is a divided highway in Bangkok Metropolitan Region, Thailand. Each side of the road is further divided into a main road and a frontage road for most of its length (with a notable exception of the section in front of Don Mueang International Airport) The road begins at the border between Phaya Thai and Din Daeng districts in Bangkok and crosses Chatuchak, Lak Si, and Don Mueang districts before merging with Phahonyothin Road (Highway 1) at Khu Khot subdistrict, Lam Luk Ka district, Pathum Thani Province. The Uttaraphimuk Elevated Tollway, better known as Don Mueang Tollway runs above the road.

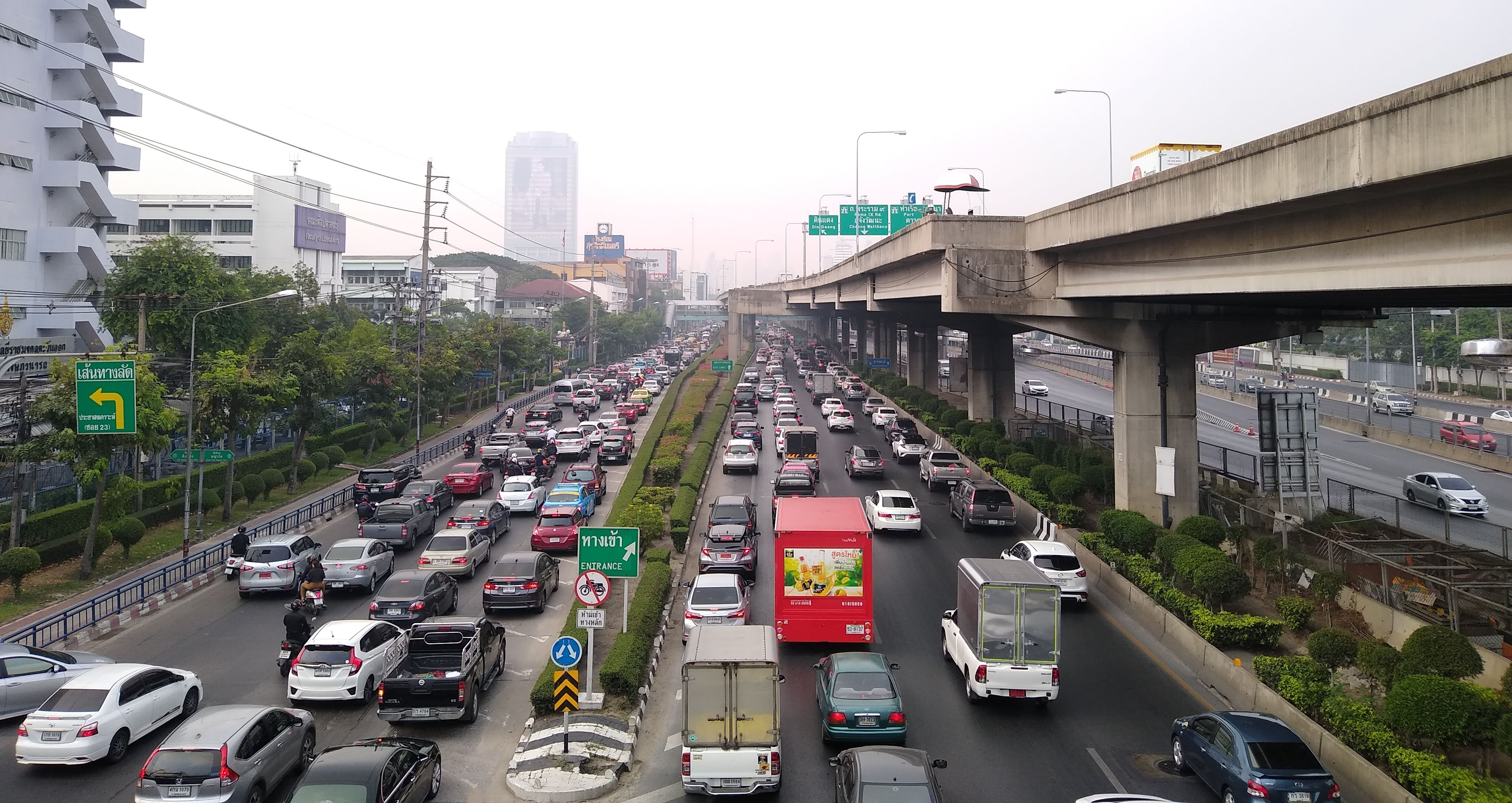
Part of Vibhavadi Rangsit Road, with Don Mueang Tollway visible to the right

== History ==
Vibhavadi Rangsit Road was opened on 27 June 1966 as a fruition of the road development project by the Thai and United States government. Mittraphap Road is another road built in this project.

It is named in honor of HRH Princess Vibhavadi Rangsit (1920–1977), a well-known Thai novelist who dedicated the final decade of her life to developing rural Southern Thailand, and was killed in an attack by insurgents while trying to rescue injured Border Patrol police. Prior to the renaming, it was commonly known as "Superhighway Road" (Thai: ถนนซูเปอร์ไฮเวย์, Thanon Superhighway).

The section between Chaeng Watthana Road and Don Mueang Airport is also part of the former local road Si Rap Suk Road(th:ถนนศรีรับสุข)

== Route ==
The road starts at Tai Duan Din Daeng (th:แยกใต้ด่วนดินแดง) (The end of Din Daeng road as well as connecting point to Chaloem Maha Nakhon Expressway) where the road becomes part of the border between Din Daeng district and Phaya Thai district in Bangkok. The road intersects Sutthisan Winitchai Road at Sutthisan Intersection, then crossing Khlong Bang Sue (The Din Daeng-Phaya Thai border ends at this point), then crossing into Chatuchak district where it intersects Phahonyothin Road and Lat Phrao Road at Lat Phrao Intersection. Then it intersects Ngamwongwan Road (Highway 302) at Bang Khen Intersection. Then it intersects Chaeng Watthana Road (Highway 304). Then it cross into Don Mueang district where it pass by Don Mueang International Airport. Then it left Bangkok's boundary to terminate at National Memorial Intersection(th:ทางแยกต่างระดับอนุสรณ์สถาน) where it meets Phahonyothin Road (again) in Khu Khot, Lam Luk Ka district, Pathum Thani province. The road's total length is 23.510 km.

Unlike most roads in Thailand, Vibhavadi Rangsit road has a different way to keep track of the kilometer marks as the mark at Anusorn Sathan Intersection is fixed to be 28+500 km. However as Vibhavadi Rangsit road is only 23.510 km in length. The other starting point of the road (at Tai Duan Din Daeng Intersection) has the mark of 4+990 km instead of the expected 0 km.

== Rapid transit ==
- Pink Line has a station near the road: Lak Si
- SRT Dark Red Line has 6 stations near the Road: Wat Samian Nari, Bang Khen, Thung Song Hong, Lak Si (interchange with Pink Line but without paid area integration), Kan Kheha and Don Mueang.
- Sukhumvit Line has a station near the road: Ha Yaek Lat Phrao BTS station
- Blue Line has a station near the road: Phahon Yothin MRT station
- In the future, Orange Line will have a station underneath the road: Din Daeng MRT station. Construction of the station is currently taking place at Vibhavadi Rangsit forest park.

== Incidents ==
On 1 October 2024, a bus from Uthai Thani Province carrying school children for a field trip crashed and went into flames while traveling outbound on the Vibhavadi Rangsit Road in Khu Khot, Lam Luk Ka District, causing 23 deaths.
