= Sai Mai subdistrict =

Sai Mai สายไหม
- Khwaeng
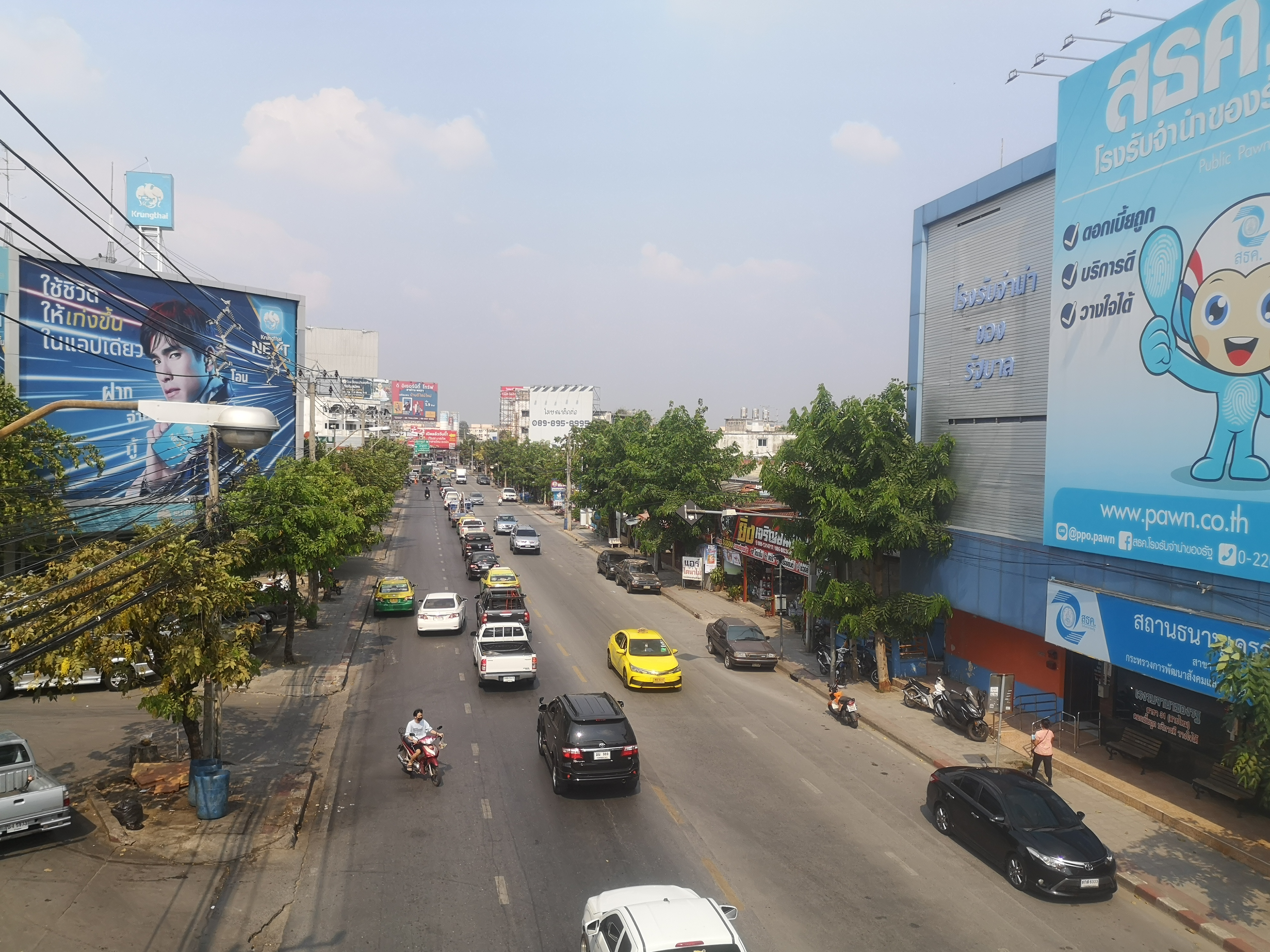
- Sukhaphiban 5 Road near Wat Nong Yai

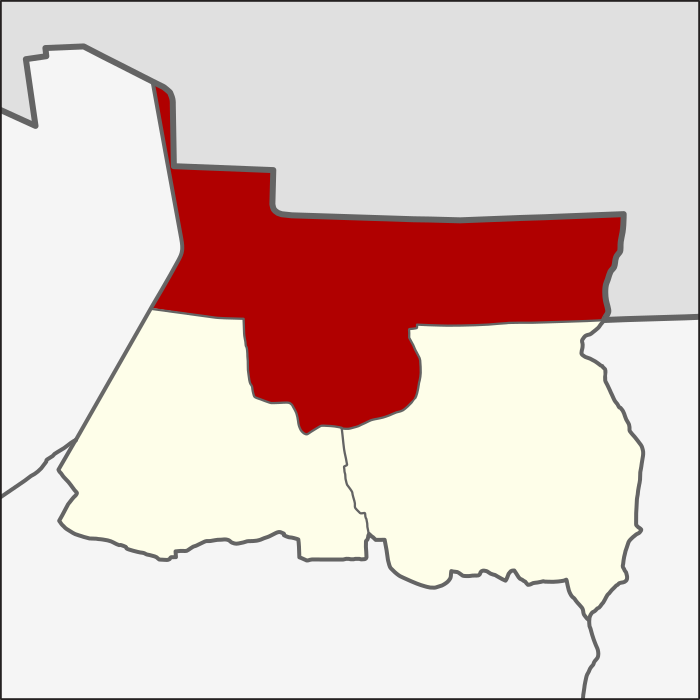
- Location in Sai Mai District
- Country: Thailand
- Province: Bangkok
- Khet: Sai Mai

Area
  - Total: 18.659 km^{2} (7.204 sq mi)

Population (2020)
  - Total: 80,784
- Time zone: UTC+7 (ICT)
- Postal code: 10220
- TIS 1099: 104201

Sai Mai (Thai: สายไหม, pronounced [sǎːj mǎj]) is a khwaeng (subdistrict) of Sai Mai District, in Bangkok, Thailand. In 2020, it had a total population of 80,784 people.
