= Lam Sam Kaeo =

Lam Sam Kaeo ลำสามแก้ว
- Town Municipality
- Location in Bangkok Metropolitan Region
- Coordinates: 13°58′22″N 100°39′04″E
- Country: Thailand
- Province: Pathum Thani
- District: Lam Luk Ka

Population (2014)
  - Total: 63,271
- Time zone: UTC+7 (ICT)
- Area code: (+66) 02

Lam Sam Kaeo (Thai: ลำสามแก้ว, pronounced [lām sǎːm kɛ̂ːw]) is a town (thesaban mueang) in Lam Luk Ka District (amphoe), Pathum Thani Province, in the Bangkok Metropolitan Region of central Thailand. In 2014, it had a population of 63,271.
