= Lam Luk Ka district =

Lam Luk Ka ลำลูกกา
- District
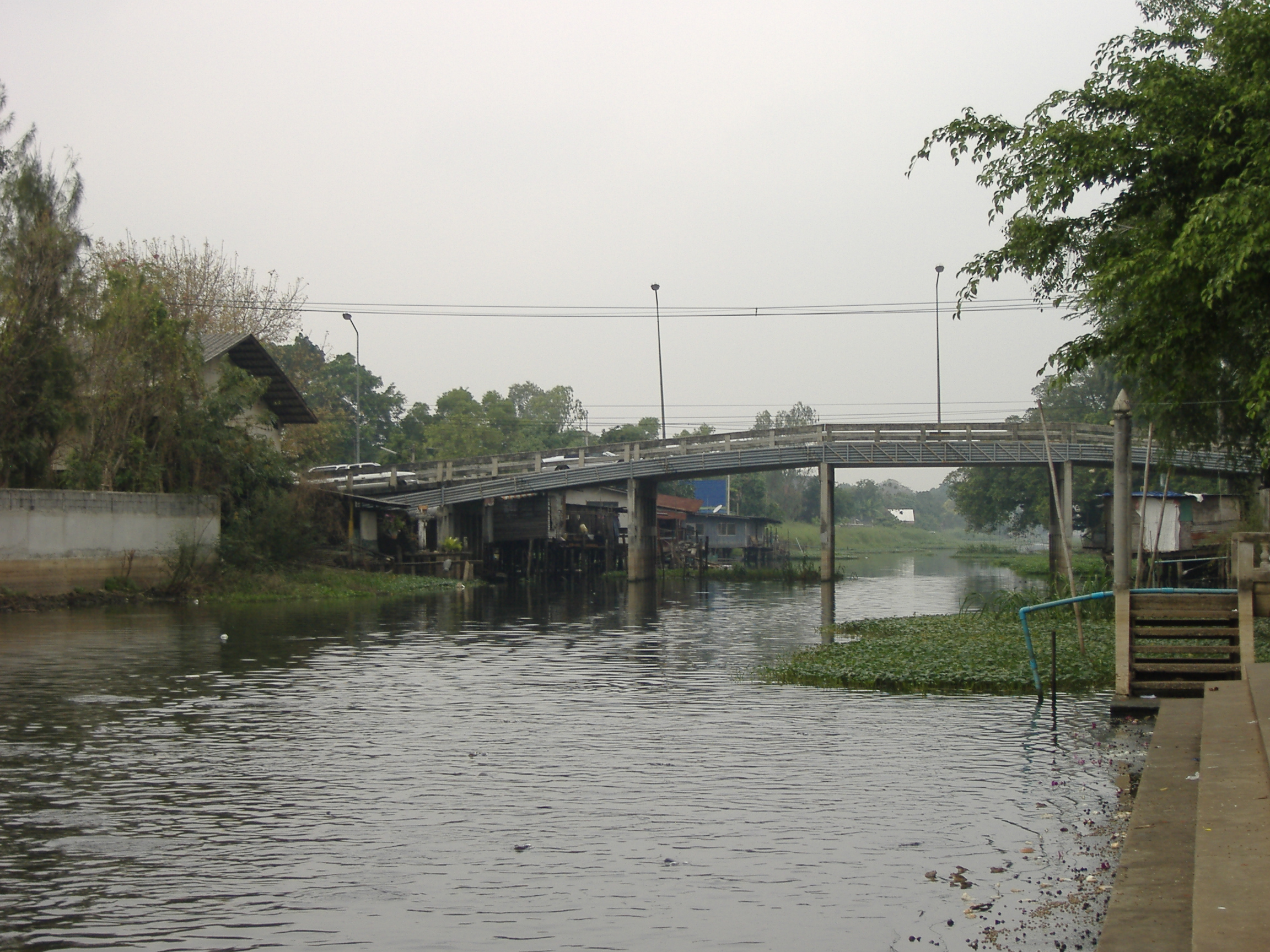
- Nameless bridge crossing canal in front of Wat Phosop Phon Charoen, Khu Khot, Lam Luk Ka

- District location in Pathum Thani province
- Coordinates: 13°55′57″N 100°44′58″E
- Country: Thailand
- Province: Pathum Thani
- Seat: Lam Luk Ka
- Subdistricts: 8

Area
  - Total: 297.71 km^{2} (114.95 sq mi)

Population (2017)
  - Total: 273,438
  - Density: 918.47/km^{2} (2,378.8/sq mi)
- Time zone: UTC+7 (ICT)
- Postal code: 12150
- Geocode: 1306

Lam Luk Ka (Thai: ลำลูกกา, pronounced [lām lûːk kāː]) is a district (amphoe) of Pathum Thani province, part of Bangkok Metropolitan Region.

== History ==
Originally, Lam Luk Ka was a vast grassland interspersed with scrublands and wetlands, serving as a natural habitat for various kinds of wildlife. It was known as "Thung Luang" (ทุ่งหลวง, lit. 'great field'). As part of national development efforts, King Chulalongkorn (Rama V) ordered the construction of Khlong Rangsit, a major irrigation canal, to pass through this area; with the availability of water, the land became more fertile, attracting settlers and leading to population growth.

The district's waterways converged into a pond that resembled a crow's foot, creating a fertile wetland that attracted many species of birds to nest. Locals came to refer to the area as "Bueng Lam Luk Ka" (Thai: บึงลำลูกกา, pronounced [bɯŋ lām lûːk kāː]), which can be interpreted as either "marsh of baby crows" or "course of baby crows." Even today, crow sculptures can be found adorning buildings and lampposts along the district's secondary roads, preserving a connection to its name.

When the government officially established amphoe Lam Luk Ka in 1904, the prefix "Bueng" (marsh or swamp), was dropped.

== Geography ==
Lam Luk Ka is a southernmost part of the province.

Neighbouring districts are (from the north clockwise): Thanyaburi of Pathum Thani; Ongkharak of Nakhon Nayok province; Bang Nam Priao of Chachoengsao province; Nong Chok, Khlong Sam Wa, Sai Mai, and Don Mueang of Bangkok; and Mueang Pathum Thani.

Khlong Rangsit is the main water resource of the district.

== Administration ==
The district is divided into eight subdistricts (tambons). There are three town municipalities (thesaban mueangs): Khu Khot, Lam Sam Kaeo, and Lat Sawai, and two subdistrict municipalities (thesaban tambons): Lam Luk Ka and Lam Sai. There are six subdistrict administrative organizations (SAO).

1.	Khu Khot	คูคต
2.	Lat Sawai	ลาดสวาย
3.	Bueng Kham Phroi	บึงคำพร้อย
4.	Lam Luk Ka	ลำลูกกา
5.	Bueng Thong Lang	บึงทองหลาง
6.	Lam Sai	ลำไทร
7.	Bueng Kho Hai	บึงคอไห
8.	Phuet Udom	พืชอุดม
