= Thanyaburi district =

Thanyaburi ธัญบุรี
- District
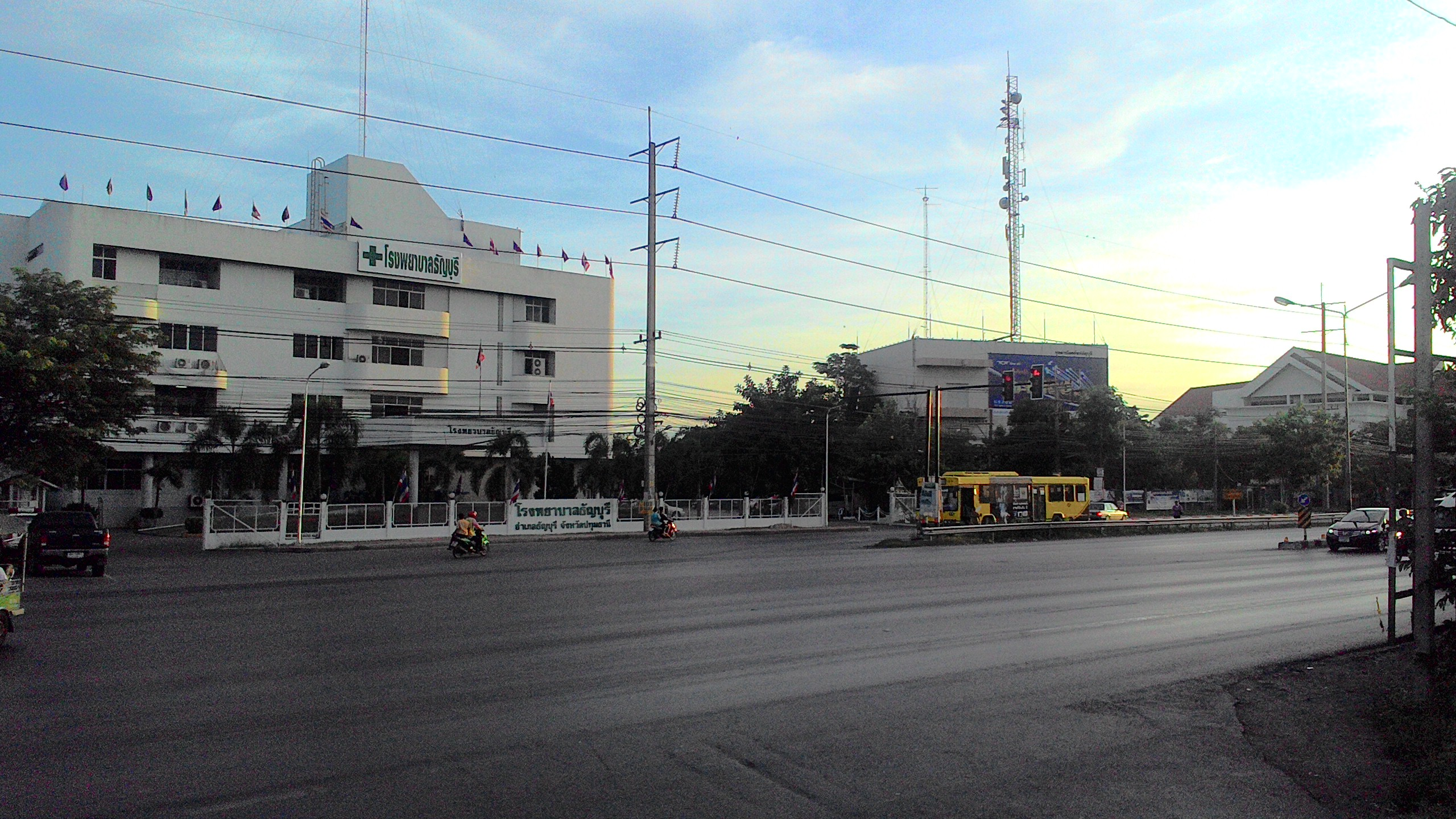
- Tambon Rangsit, Thanyaburi District (in front of Thanyaburi Hospital)

- District location in Pathum Thani province
- Coordinates: 14°1′16″N 100°44′4″E
- Country: Thailand
- Province: Pathum Thani
- Seat: Rangsit

Area
  - Total: 112.124 km^{2} (43.291 sq mi)

Population (2017)
  - Total: 206,582
  - Density: 1,842.44/km^{2} (4,771.9/sq mi)
- Time zone: UTC+7 (ICT)
- Postal code: 12110
- Geocode: 1303

Thanyaburi (Thai: ธัญบุรี, pronounced [tʰān.já(ʔ).bū.rīː]) is a district (amphoe) in Pathum Thani province.

== History ==
Mueang Thanyaburi was built by order of King Rama V in 1901. The city name translates to 'rice city'. At the same time, King Rama V ordered Min Buri (มีนบุรี, 'fish city') to be built as its twin. The province was abolished and incorporated into Pathum Thani in 1932.

The district's name was changed from Mueang to Rangsit in 1917. In 1938 it was renamed "Thanyaburi".

== Geography ==
Mueang Thanyaburi is in the eastern part of the Chao Phraya valley that is called Thung Luang. It is easily accessible from Bangkok via the Eastern Outer Ring Road (9) or from Rangsit centre on Highway 305 (Rangsit-Nakhon Nayok)

The main water resource of Thanyaburi is Khlong Rangsit. It was the first canal (Khlong) for irrigation purposes of Siam.

Neighboring districts are (from the north clockwise): Khlong Luang and Nong Suea of Pathum Thani; Ongkharak of Nakhon Nayok province; Lam Luk Ka and Mueang Pathum Thani of Pathum Thani Province.

== Economy ==
Thanyaburi district is the site of the Government Pharmaceutical Organization's "second factory". This facility, among other pursuits, houses the firm's medical marijuana farm and production line for cannabinoid medicines.

Dream World amusement park is in Thanyaburi district which is visited by many tourists. It includes a refrigerated indoor snow covered hill where tropical people can experience a touch of winter conditions and tobogganing fun.

== Administration ==
The district is divided into six sub-districts (tambons), which are further subdivided into 12 villages (mubans). There is one city (thesaban nakhon), two towns (thesaban mueangs), and one sub-district municipality (thesaban tambon) in the district. Rangsit city covers tambon Prachathipat. Sanan Rak town covers tambons Bueng Sanan and Bueng Nam Rak and the town Bueng Yitho covers tambon Bueng Yitho. The subdistrict municipality Thanyaburi covers tambons Rangsit and Lam Phak Kut.

No.	Name	Thai	Villages	Pop.
1.	Prachathipat	ประชาธิปัตย์	-	82,483
2.	Bueng Yitho	บึงยี่โถ	4	31,891
3.	Rangsit	รังสิต	4	24,735
4.	Lam Phak Kut	ลำผักกูด	4	37,185
5.	Bueng Sanan	บึงสนั่น	-	12,260
6.	Bueng Nam Rak	บึงน้ำรักษ์	-	18,028

== Notable people ==
- Saen Sor Ploenchit – former WBA Flyweight World Champion
- Sirimongkol Singmanasak – former WBC Bantamweight and Super-featherweight World Champion
