= Miss Grand Prachinburi =

Provincial pageant in Prachinburi, Thailand

Miss Grand ฺPrachinburi มิสแกรนด์ปราจีนบุรี
- Formation: January 29, 2017; 9 years ago
- Founder: Nattapol Duj-ariyathanon
- Type: Beauty pageant
- Headquarters: Prachinburi
- Location: Thailand
- Official language: Thai
- Provincial Director: Tanakorn Siangploen (2025)
- Affiliations: Miss Grand Thailand

Summary result of Prachinburi representatives at Miss Grand Thailand
Placement	Number(s)
Winner	0
1st runner-up	0
2nd runner-up	0
3rd runner-up	0
4th runner-up	0
Top 10/11/12	0
Top 20/21	0
Unplaced	9

Miss Grand Prachinburi (Thai: มิสแกรนด์ปราจีนบุรี) is a Thai provincial beauty pageant which selects a representative from Prachinburi province to the Miss Grand Thailand national competition. It was founded in 2017 by an entrepreneur Nattapol Duj-ariyathanon (ณัฐพล ดุจอริยธนนท์).

Since 2016, Prachinburi representatives have not secured any placement in the Miss Grand Thailand national contest.

== History ==
In 2016, after Miss Grand Thailand began franchising the provincial competitions to individual organizers, who would name seventy-seven provincial titleholders to compete in the national pageant. The license for Prachinburi province was granted to a media company led by Praphan Rayayoi (ประพันธ์ ระยาย้อย), who appointed Nittaya Aiem-akson as Prachinburi candidate for the Miss Grand Thailand 2016 national contest. In 2017, Rayayoi lost the license to Nattapol Duj-ariyathanon, who organized the first Miss Grand Prachinburi contest on January 29, 2017, in Na Di district and named Kanoklak Promsanthia the winner.

The pageant was usually co-organized with other provincial pageants, including Miss Grand Nakhon Nayok in 2018, Miss Grand Sa Kaeo from 2019 to 2022, and Miss Grand Chai Nat in 2023. It was a stand-alone pageant only in 2017 and 2024.

The pageant was skipped once; in 2021, due to the COVID-19 pandemic in Thailand, the national organizer was unable to organize the national event, and the country representative for the international tournament was appointed instead.

Winner gallery

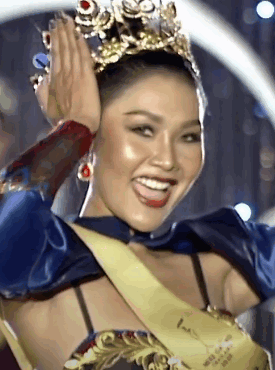
Mueanphan Kunket,
Miss Grand Prachinburi 2022

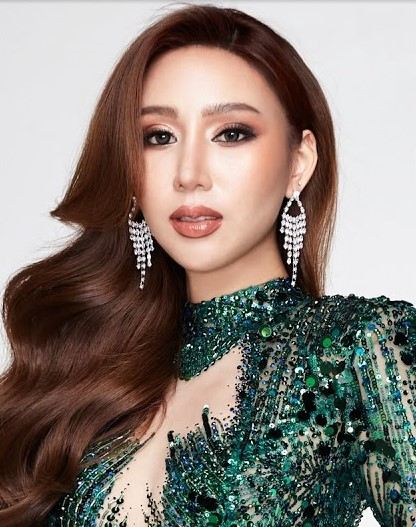
Supissara Sangthong,
Miss Grand Prachinburi 2023

== Editions ==
The following table details Miss Grand Prachinburi's annual editions since 2017.

Edition	Date	Final venue	Entrants	Winner	Ref.
1st	January 29, 2017	Robinson Lifestyle Prachin Buri, Mueang Prachinburi, Prachinburi	16	Kanoklak Promsanthia	
2nd (Note: Organized as an inter-provincial pageant with the Miss Grand Nakhon Nayok contest.)	March 31, 2018	The Verona at Tub Lan, Na Di, Prachin Buri	20	Waritsara Triwan	
3rd (Note: Organized as an inter-provincial pageant with the Miss Grand Sa Kaeo contest.)	May 31, 2019	Tawa Ravadee Resort, Si Maha Phot, Prachin Buri	13	Patcharida Ngongking	
4th	July 18, 2020	Tawa Ravadee Resort, Si Maha Phot, Prachin Buri	10	Nadaphan Rattanopkorn	
5th	February 26, 2022	Robinson Lifestyle Prachin Buri, Mueang Prachinburi, Prachinburi	16	Muenphan Koonket	
6th (Note: Organized as an inter-provincial pageant with the Miss Grand Chai Nat contest.)	November 18, 2022	Tawa Ravadee Resort, Si Maha Phot, Prachin Buri	10	Supitsara Saengthong	
7th	January 19, 2024	Amari Don Muang Airport Hotel, Don Muang, Bangkok	7	Chakriya Wetanithisakun	
9th	December 1, 2024	Sunantanusorn Auditorium, Suan Sunandha Rajabhat University, Bangkok	13	Pornpimol Kulap	

== National competition ==
The following is a list of Prachinburi representatives who competed at the Miss Grand Thailand pageant.

Year	Representative		Original provincial title	Placement at Miss Grand Thailand	Provincial director	Ref.
Year	Romanized name	Thai name	Original provincial title	Placement at Miss Grand Thailand	Provincial director	Ref.
2016	Nittaya Aiem-akson	นิตยา เอี่ยมอักษร	Appointed	Unplaced	Praphan Rayayoi	
2017	Kanoklak Promsanthia	กนกลักษณ์ พร้อมสันเทียะ	Miss Grand Prachinburi 2017	Unplaced	Nattapol Duj-ariyathanon	
2018	Waritsara Triwan	วริศรา ไตรวรรณ	Miss Grand Prachinburi 2018	Unplaced	Chantawat Kasemnet	
2019	Patcharida Ngongking	พัชริดา งอนกิ่ง	Miss Grand Prachinburi 2019	Unplaced	Pitsada Songklod	
2020	Nadaphan Rattanopkorn	ณดาพัน รัตโนปกรณ์	Miss Grand Prachinburi 2020	Unplaced	Pitsada Songklod	
2021	No national pageant due to the COVID-19 pandemic.					
2022	Muenphan Koonket	เหมือนฝัน กุลเกตุ	Miss Grand Prachinburi 2022	Unplaced	Pitsada Songklod	
2023	Supitsara Saengthong	ศุภิสรา แสงทอง	Miss Grand Prachinburi 2023	Unplaced	Piriya Seannok	
2024	Chakriya Wetanithisakun	ชาคริยา เวทนิธิสกุล	Miss Grand Prachinburi 2024	Unplaced	Thanwalai Paochinda	
2025	Pornpimol Kulap	พรพิมล กุหลาบ	Miss Grand Prachinburi 2025	Unplaced	Tanakorn Siangploen	
