= Prachantakham railway station =

Railway station in Thailand

Prachantakham ประจันตคาม

General information
- Location: Prachantakham Subdistrict, Prachantakham District; Prachinburi Province; Thailand
- Coordinates: 14.0632°N 101.5186°E
- Operator: State Railway of Thailand
- Manager: Ministry of Transport
- Platforms: 1
- Tracks: 2

Construction
- Structure type: At-grade

Other information
- Station code: จค.
- Classification: Class 2

Services
Preceding station	State Railway of Thailand	Following station
Khok Makok towards Hua Lamphong	Eastern Line	Nong Saeng towards Poipet (Cambodia)
Location

Prachantakham railway station is a railway station located in Prachantakham Subdistrict, Prachantakham District, Prachinburi Province. It is a class 2 railway station located 137.65 km (85.5 mi) from Bangkok railway station.
