= Prachinburi (disambiguation) =

Prachinburi (officially, Prachin Buri) may refer to these places in Thailand:

- Prachinburi, a town
- Prachinburi Province
- Mueang Prachinburi district
- Prachin Buri River
