= Miss Grand Sa Kaeo =

Provincial pageant in Sa Kaeo, Thailand

Miss Grand ฺSa Kaeo มิสแกรนด์สระแก้ว
- Formation: May 11, 2016; 9 years ago
- Founder: Sarawut Wangdunlayakitti
- Type: Beauty pageant
- Headquarters: Sa Kaeo
- Location: Thailand
- Official language: Thai
- Provincial Director: Tanakorn Siangploen (2024–present)
- Affiliations: Miss Grand Thailand

Summary result of Sa Kaeo representatives at Miss Grand Thailand
Placement	Number(s)
Winner	0
1st runner-up	0
2nd runner-up	0
3rd runner-up	0
4th runner-up	1
Top 10/11/12	2
Top 20/21	0
Unplaced	6

Miss Grand Sa Kaeo (Thai: มิสแกรนด์สระแก้ว) is a Thai provincial beauty pageant which selects a representative from Sa Kaeo province to the Miss Grand Thailand national competition. It was founded in 2017 by an entrepreneur Sarawut Wangdunlayakitti (สราวุธ หวังดุลยกิตติ).

Sa Kaeo representatives have yet to win the Miss Grand Thailand title. The highest they obtained in the contest was the fourth runner-up, achieved in 2018 by Matawee Teeraleekul.

== History ==
In 2016, after Miss Grand Thailand began franchising the provincial competitions to individual organizers, who would name seventy-seven provincial titleholders to compete in the national pageant. The license for Sa Kaeo province was granted to a media company led by Sarawut Wangdunlayakitti, who organized the first Miss Grand Sa Kaeo in Aranyaprathet on May 11, 2016, and named Maythika Luepaktra the winner. Wangdunlayakitti lost the license to a producer Pitsada Songklod in 2019. Under Songklod's directorship, the pageant was co-organized with the Miss Grand Prachinburi pageant until 2022.

The pageant was skipped once; in 2021, due to the COVID-19 pandemic in Thailand, the national organizer was unable to organize the national event, and the country representative for the international tournament was appointed instead.

Winner gallery

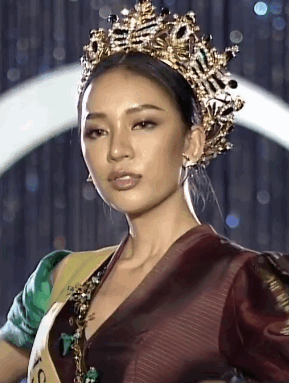
Suttida Chaiyakam,
Miss Grand Sa Kaeo 2022

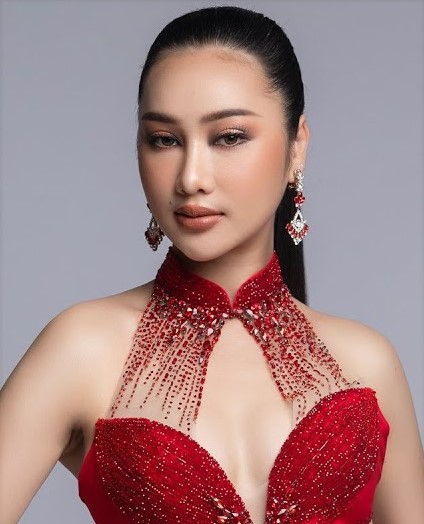
Baralee Ruamrak,
Miss Grand Sa Kaeo 2023

== Editions ==
The following table details Miss Grand Sa Kaeo's annual editions since 2016.

Edition	Date	Final venue	Entrants	Winner	Ref.
1st	May 11, 2016	The Velo's Hotel & BMX Pump Track Hotel, Aranyaprathet, Sa Kaeo	13	Maythika Luepaktra	
2nd	March 31, 2017	La villa Boutique Hotel, Aranyaprathet, Sa Kaeo	12	Nararin Pimpisarn	
3rd	January 28, 2018	Phra Siam Devathirat Monument's Courtyard, Aranyaprathet, Sa Kaeo	10	Matawee Teeraleekul	
4th (Note: Organized as an inter-provincial pageant with the Miss Grand Prachinburi contest.)	May 31, 2019	Tawa Ravadee Resort, Si Maha Phot, Prachin Buri	13	Chadaporn Chaisorn	
5th	July 18, 2020	Tawa Ravadee Resort, Si Maha Phot, Prachin Buri	10	Natchapat Boonthong (Note: Later resigned.)	
6th	February 26, 2022	Robinson Lifestyle Prachin Buri, Mueang Prachinburi, Prachinburi	16	Suthida Chaikam	
7th	January 29, 2023	Mercury Cabaret Hall, Suan Luang, Bangkok	10	Baralee Ruamrak	
8th	December 17, 2023	Landmark Club, Sai Mai, Bangkok	7	Kamonpetch Petchwarangkun	
9th	December 1, 2024	Sunantanusorn Auditorium, Suan Sunandha Rajabhat University, Bangkok	13	Bawonrat Maneerat	

== National competition ==
The following is a list of Sa Kaeo representatives who competed at the Miss Grand Thailand pageant.

Year	Representative		Original provincial title	Placement at Miss Grand Thailand	Provincial director	Ref.
Year	Romanized name	Thai name	Original provincial title	Placement at Miss Grand Thailand	Provincial director	Ref.
2016	Maythika Luepaktra	เมทิกา ลือพักตรา	Miss Grand Sa Kaeo 2016	Unplaced	Sarawut Wangdunlayakitti	
2017	Nararin Pimpisarn	นาราริน พิมพิสาร	Miss Grand Sa Kaeo 2017	Top 12	Sarawut Wangdunlayakitti	
2018	Matawee Teeraleekul	เมธาวี ธีรลีกุล	Miss Grand Sa Kaeo 2018	4th runner-up	Sarawut Wangdunlayakitti	
2019	Chadaporn Chaisorn	ชฎาภรณ์ ไชยสอน	Miss Grand Sa Kaeo 2019	Unplaced	Pitsada Songklod	
2020	Natchaphat Bunthong	ณัชชาภัทร บุญทอง	Miss Grand Sa Kaeo 2020	Resigned	Pitsada Songklod	
2020	Chonthicha Phosri	ชลธิชา โพธิ์ศรี	Top 6 – Miss Grand Prachinburi & Sa Kaeo 2020	Unplaced	Pitsada Songklod	
2021	No national pageant due to the COVID-19 pandemic.					
2022	Suthida Chaikam	สุทธิดา ไชยคำ	Miss Grand Sa Kaeo 2022	Unplaced	Pitsada Songklod	
2023	Baralee Ruamrak	บราลี ร่วมรักษ์	Miss Grand Sa Kaeo 2023	Unplaced	Thanaporn Meethong	
2024	Kamonpetch Petchwarangkun	กมลเพชร เพชรวรางกูล	Miss Grand Sa Kaeo 2024	Unplaced	Tanakorn Siangploen	
2025	Bawonrat Maneerat	บวรรัตน์ มณีรัตน์	Miss Grand Sa Kaeo 2025	5th runner-up	Tanakorn Siangploen	
