= Yothaka =

Subdistrict in Chachoengsao, Thailand

Coordinates: 13°55′17.9″N 101°07′20.4″E

Yothaka โยธะกา
- Tambon
- Interactive map of Yothaka
- Country: Thailand
- Province: Chachoengsao
- District: Bang Nam Priao
- Time zone: UTC+7 (ICT)

Yothaka (Thai: โยธะกา) is a tambon (subdistrict) of Bang Nam Priao district, Chachoengsao province, eastern Thailand.

== History ==
Yothaka separated from Don Ko Ka and Mon Thong Subdistricts in 1937. It is named after the Yothaka River, better known as Nakhon Nayok River that flows through the area. Yothaka means 'orchid tree' (Bauhinia monandra) as, in the past, along the Nakhon Nayok River, this species was abundant.

== Geography ==
Most of the subdistrict is lowland, suitable for cultivation. Yothaka residents live along the irrigation canal and Nakhon Nayok River, which is the boundary between Chachoengsao and Nakhon Nayok provinces

Neighboring tambons are (from the north clockwise): Bang Sombun of Ongkharak district, Nakhon Nayok Province, Singto Thong, Bang Khanak of Bang Khanak district, and Bang Taen of Ban Sang district, and Prachinburi province.

The eastern line railway station, Yothaka, is in Bang Toei Subdistrict, Ban Sang district. Pak Nam Yothaka, the confluence of the Prachinburi and Nakhon Nayok Rivers, is in Bang Taen subdistrict, Ban Sang district.

== Administration ==
Yothaka is administered by the Subdistrict Administrative Organization (SAO) Yothaka (องค์การบริหารส่วนตำบลโยธะกา). Yothaka also contains 12 mubans (villages).
