= Khok Makok railway station =

Railway station in Thailand

Khok Makok โคกมะกอก
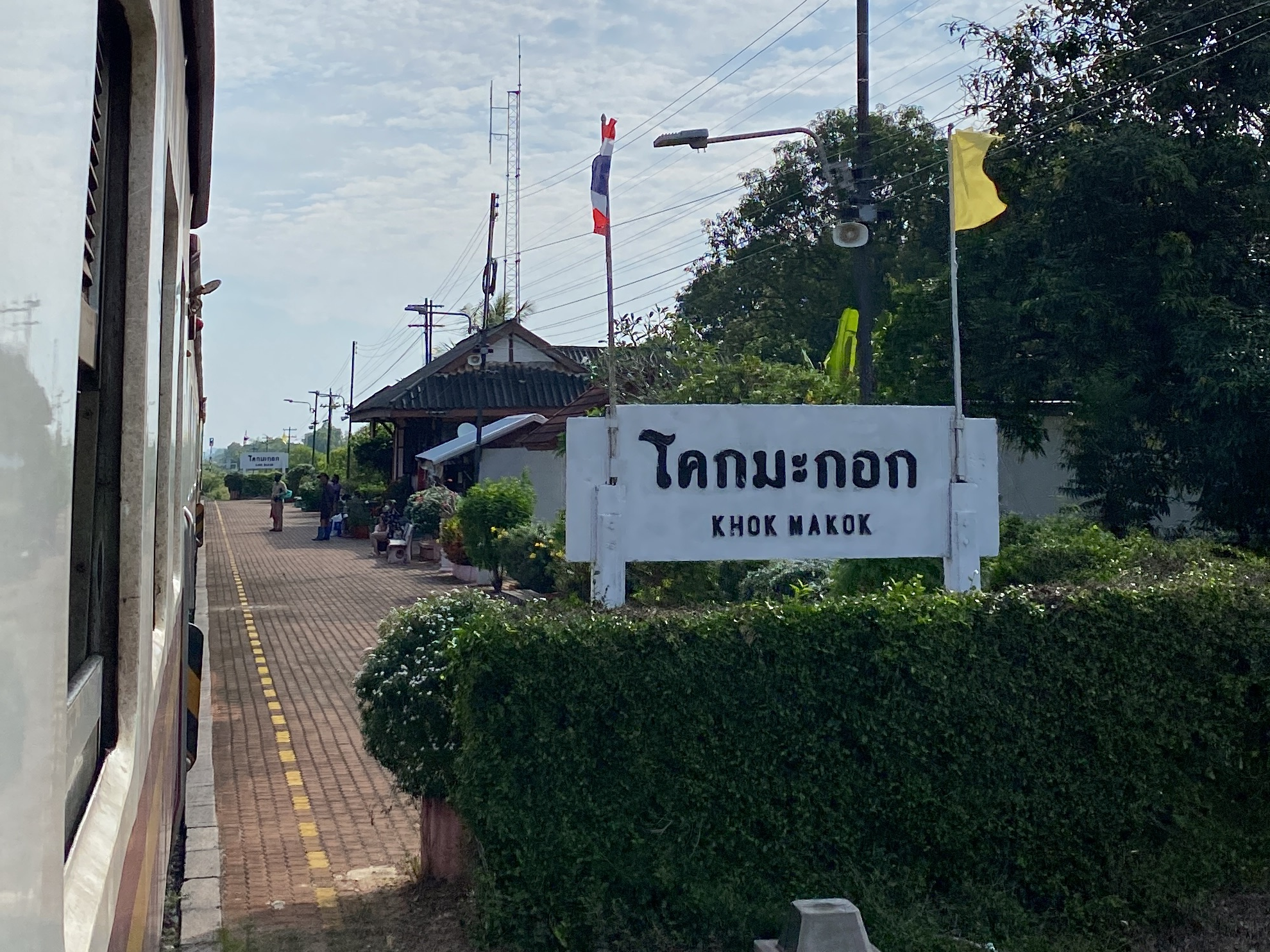
- The station in 2022

General information
- Location: Non Hom Subdistrict, Mueang Prachinburi District; Prachinburi Province; Thailand
- Coordinates: 14.0649°N 101.4579°E
- Operator: State Railway of Thailand
- Manager: Ministry of Transport
- Line: Aranyaprathet Main Line
- Platforms: 1
- Tracks: 2

Construction
- Structure type: At-grade

Other information
- Station code: กอ.
- Classification: Class 3

Services
Preceding station	State Railway of Thailand	Following station
Nong Krachap Halt towards Hua Lamphong	Eastern Line	Prachantakham towards Poipet (Cambodia)
Location

Khok Makok railway station is a railway station located in Non Hom Subdistrict, Mueang Prachinburi District, Prachinburi Province. It is a class 3 railway station located 131.00 km (81.4 mi) from Bangkok railway station.
