= Ban Sang railway station =

Railway station in Thailand

Ban Sang บ้านสร้าง

General information
- Location: Ban Sang Subdistrict, Ban Sang District; Prachinburi Province; Thailand
- Coordinates: 14.0151°N 101.2029°E
- Operator: State Railway of Thailand
- Manager: Ministry of Transport
- Line: Aranyaprathet Main Line
- Platforms: 1
- Tracks: 2

Construction
- Structure type: At-grade

Other information
- Station code: สา.
- Classification: Class 3

Services
Preceding station	State Railway of Thailand	Following station
Yothaka towards Hua Lamphong	Eastern Line	Nong Nam Khao Halt towards Poipet (Cambodia)
Location

Ban Sang station (Thai: สถานีบ้านสร้าง) is a railway station located in Ban Sang Subdistrict, Ban Sang District, Prachinburi Province. It is a class 3 railway station located 101.53 km (63.1 mi) from Bangkok railway station.
