= Miss Grand Nakhon Nayok =

Provincial pageant in Nakhon Nayok, Thailand

Miss Grand Nakhon Nayok มิสแกรนด์นครนายก
- Formation: May 20, 2017; 8 years ago
- Founder: Kriangsak Sakulchai
- Type: Beauty pageant
- Headquarters: Nakhon Nayok
- Location: Thailand
- Official language: Thai
- Provincial Director: Chanattee Penpoungsint (2023–present)
- Affiliations: Miss Grand Thailand

Summary result of Nakhon Nayok representatives at Miss Grand Thailand
Placement	Number(s)
Winner	0
1st runner-up	0
2nd runner-up	0
3rd runner-up	0
4th runner-up	0
Top 10/11/12	1
Top 20/21	0
Unplaced	7

Miss Grand Nakhon Nayok (Thai: มิสแกรนด์นครนายก) is a Thai provincial beauty pageant which selects a representative from Nakhon Nayok province to the Miss Grand Thailand national competition. It was founded in 2017 by television personality Kriangsak Sakulchai (เกรียงศักดิ์ สกุลชัย, also known as Toy Aigner [ต้อย แอคเนอร์]).

Nakhon Nayok representatives have yet to win the Miss Grand Thailand title. The highest and only placement they obtained in the contest was in the top 10 finalists, achieved in 2016 by Ransaya Thananithiya.

== History ==
In 2016, after Miss Grand Thailand began franchising the provincial competitions to individual organizers, who would name seventy-seven provincial titleholders to compete in the national pageant. The license for Nakhon Nayok province was granted to a local businessperson Khomkrit Noiwilai, who appointed Ransaya Thananithiya as the province representative to the 2016 national contest. Later in 2017, Noiwilai lost the license to television personality Kriangsak Sakulchai, who organized the first Miss Grand Nakhon Nayok contest in Ban Na and named Nilanara Nilnatnarong the winner.

The pageant was co-organized with other provincial pageants twice; with the Miss Grand Prachinburi and Miss Grand Ang Thong in 2018 and 2025, respectively.

The pageant was skipped once; in 2021, due to the COVID-19 pandemic in Thailand, the national organizer was unable to organize the national event, and the country representative for the international tournament was appointed instead.

Winner gallery

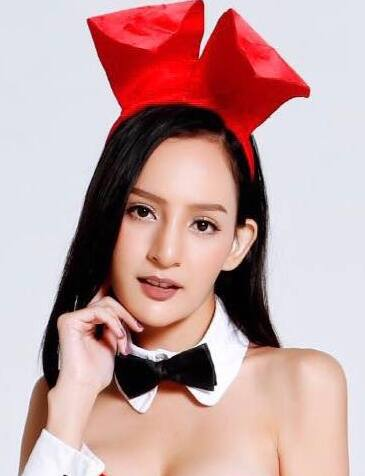
Nilanara Nilnatnarong,
Miss Grand Nakhon Nayok 2017

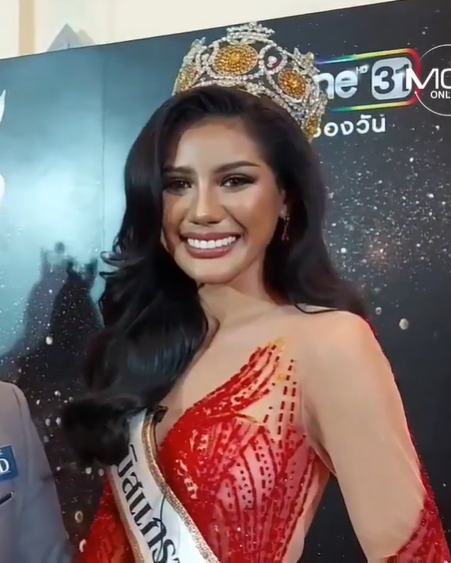
Lalita Singsakul,
Miss Grand Nakhon Nayok 2020

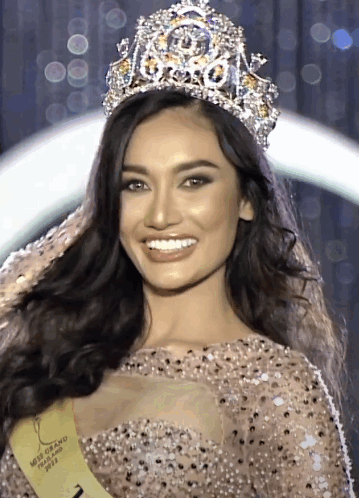
Nachita Jantana,
Miss Grand Nakhon Nayok 2022

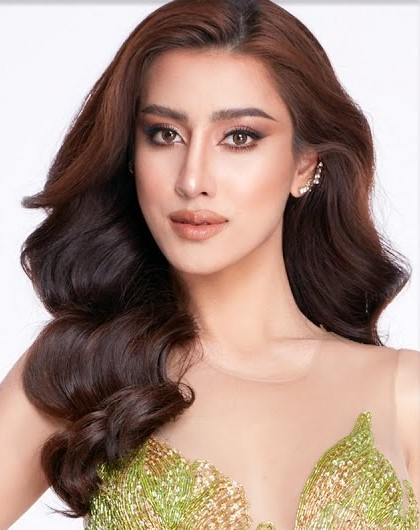
Patcharida Poolsakworasarn,
Miss Grand Nakhon Nayok 2023

== Editions ==
The following table details Miss Grand Nakhon Nayok's annual editions since 2017.

Edition	Date	Final venue	Entrants	Winner	Ref.
1st	May 20, 2017	Cholapruek Resort, Ban Na, Nakhon Nayok	10	Nilnara Nilnatnarong	
2nd (Note: Organized as an inter-provincial pageant with the Miss Grand Prachinburi contest.)	March 31, 2018	The Verona at Tub Lan, Na Di, Prachin Buri	18	Kirasa Homsiang	
3rd	May 16, 2019	Wangyao Riverside Resort, Mueang Nakhon Nayok, Nakhon Nayok	14	Banthita Kaewmuean	
4th	July 16, 2020	Wangyao Riverside Resort, Mueang Nakhon Nayok, Nakhon Nayok	16	Lalita Singsakul	
5th	January 26, 2022	Mirinn Club, Royal City Avenue, Bangkok	12	Nachita Jantana	
6th	January 28, 2023	Golden Dome Cabaret Show Teater, Huai Khwang, Bangkok	11	Patcharida Poolsakworasarn	
7th	December 3, 2023	Mirinn Club, Royal City Avenue, Bangkok	15	Thipphayaphon Akkaraphon	
8th (Note: Organized as an inter-provincial pageant with the Miss Grand Ang Thong contest.)	December 24, 2024	Siam Fantasy, Asiatique, Bangkok	10	Napasorn Panpanich	

== National competition ==
The following is a list of Nakhon Nayok representatives who competed at the Miss Grand Thailand pageant.

Year	Representative		Original provincial title	Placement at Miss Grand Thailand	Provincial director	Ref.
Year	Romanized name	Thai name	Original provincial title	Placement at Miss Grand Thailand	Provincial director	Ref.
2016	Ransaya Thananithiya	รัญสญา ธนานิธิยา	Appointed	Top 10	Khomkrit Noiwilai	
2017	Nilnara Nilnatnarong	นิลนารา นิลนาถณรงค์	Miss Grand Nakhon Nayok 2017	Unplaced	Kriangsak Sakulchai	
2018	Kirasa Homsiang	กิรษา หอมเสียง	Miss Grand Nakhon Nayok 2018	Unplaced	Sarawut Wangdunlayakitti	
2019	Banthita Kaewmuean	บัญฑิตา แก้วเหมือน	Miss Grand Nakhon Nayok 2019	Unplaced	Krittanon Rattanachayangkun	
2020	Lalita Singsakul	ลลิตา สิงห์สกุล	Miss Grand Nakhon Nayok 2020	Unplaced	Singharat Puangchim	
2021	No national pageant due to the COVID-19 pandemic.					
2022	Nachita Jantana	นชิตา จันทนา	Miss Grand Nakhon Nayok 2022	Unplaced	Singharat Puangchim	
2023	Patcharida Poolsakworasarn	พัชริดา พูลศักดิ์วรสาร	Miss Grand Nakhon Nayok 2023	Unplaced	Chanattee Penpoungsint and Thayan Tunthasen	
2024	Thipphayaphon Akkaraphon	ทิพยาภรณ์ อัครพล	Miss Grand Nakhon Nayok 2024	Unplaced	Chanattee Penpoungsint and Thayan Tunthasen	
2025	Napasorn Panpanich	ณภษร ปั้นพานิช	Miss Grand Nakhon Nayok 2025	Unplaced	Chanattee Penpoungsint and Thayan Tunthasen	
