= Wang Nam Khiao district =

District of Thailand

Wang Nam Khiao วังน้ำเขียว
- District
- District location in Nakhon Ratchasima province
- Coordinates: 14°25′6″N 101°51′0″E
- Country: Thailand
- Province: Nakhon Ratchasima
- Seat: Wang Nam Khiao

Area
  - Total: 1,129.996 km^{2} (436.294 sq mi)

Population (2000)
  - Total: 41,485
  - Density: 36.7/km^{2} (95/sq mi)
- Time zone: UTC+7 (ICT)
- Postal code: 30370, 30150
- Geocode: 3025

Wang Nam Khiao (Thai: วังน้ำเขียว, pronounced [wāŋ ná(ː)m kʰǐaw]; Northeastern Thai: วังน้ำเขียว, pronounced [wâŋ nȁ(ː)m kʰǐaw]) is a district (amphoe) in the southern part of Nakhon Ratchasima province, northeastern Thailand.

== History ==
The minor district (king amphoe) Wang Nam Khiao was created by separating the four tambons Wang Nam Khiao, Wang Mi, Udom Sap, and Raroeng of Pak Thong Chai district on 1 April 1992. It was upgraded to a full district on 5 December 1996.

== Geography ==
Neighbouring districts are (from the north clockwise): Pak Thong Chai, Khon Buri of Nakhon Ratchasima Province; Na Di and Prachantakham of Prachinburi province; Pak Chong and Sung Noen of Nakhon Ratchasima.

The Sankamphaeng Range mountainous area is in the southern part of this district.

== Administration ==
The district is divided into five subdistricts (tambons). San Chao Pho is a township (thesaban tambon), which covers parts of the tambon Wang Nam Khiao and Thai Samakkhi.

1.	Wang Nam Khiao	วังน้ำเขียว
2.	Wang Mi	วังหมี
3.	Raroeng	ระเริง
4.	Udom Sap	อุดมทรัพย์
5.	Thai Samakkhi	ไทยสามัคคี
