= Yothaka railway station =

Railway station in Bang Toei, Thailand

Yothaka โยทะกา
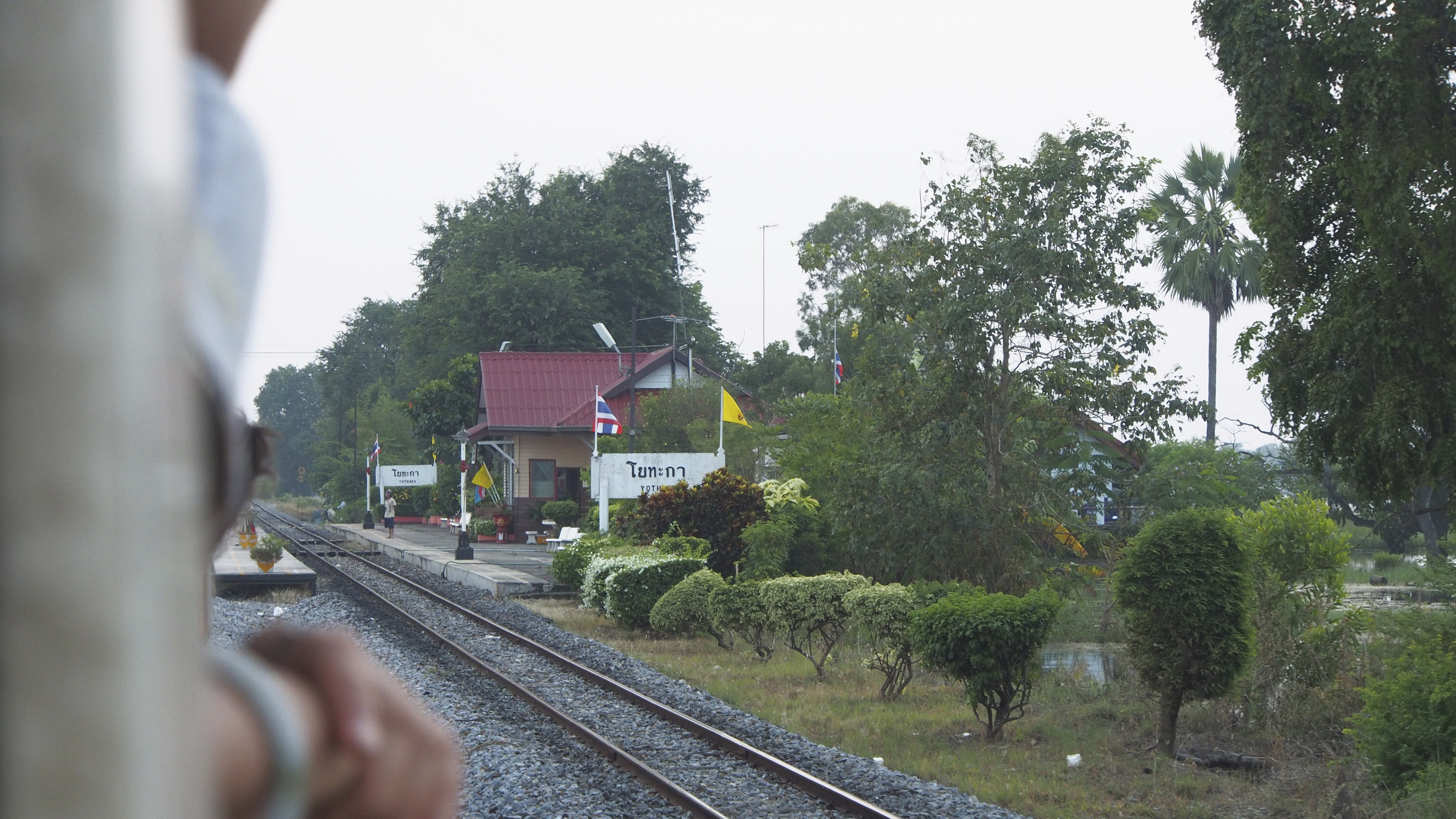
- Yothaka railway station, 28 October 2013

General information
- Location: 4002 Rural Rd, Bang Toei, Ban Sang District; Prachinburi Province; Thailand
- Operator: State Railway of Thailand
- Manager: Ministry of Transport
- Line: Aranyaprathet Main Line
- Platforms: 1
- Tracks: 2

Construction
- Structure type: At-grade

Other information
- Station code: ยท.
- Classification: Class 4

Services
Preceding station	State Railway of Thailand	Following station
Khlong Yi Sip Et Halt towards Hua Lamphong	Eastern Line	Ban Sang towards Poipet (Cambodia)
Location

Yothaka railway station (Thai: สถานีรถไฟโยทะกา) is a railway station located in Bang Toei Subdistrict, Ban Sang District, Prachinburi Province. The station is a part of eastern railway line and is a class 4 railway station located 93.73 km (58 mi) from Hua Lamphong (Bangkok railway station).

Its name is assumed to be from its location near Paknam Yothaka (Yothaka estuary), where is a confluence of rivers Prachinburi and Nakhon Nayok. Or may be from the name of yothaka flower (Bauhinia monandra) because in the past this place has species of plants blooming all the way.

== Train services ==
- Ordinary train No. 275/276 Bangkok – Ban Klong Luk Border – Bangkok
- Ordinary train No. 279/280 Bangkok – Ban Klong Luk Border – Bangkok
