= Tambon Khao Yai =

Tambon Khao Yai may refer to:

- Tambon Khao Yai, a former subdistrict of Pak Phli District, Thailand
- Tambon Khao Yai in Ao Luek District, Krabi Province
- Tambon Khao Yai in Cha-am District, Phetchaburi Province
