= Bang Nam Priao district =

Bang Nam Priao บางน้ำเปรี้ยว
- District
- District location in Chachoengsao province
- Coordinates: 13°50′50″N 101°3′12″E
- Country: Thailand
- Province: Chachoengsao
- Seat: Bang Nam Priao

Area
  - Total: 498.659 km^{2} (192.533 sq mi)

Population (2017)
  - Total: 88,020
  - Density: 176.51/km^{2} (457.2/sq mi)
- Time zone: UTC+7 (ICT)
- Postal code: 24150
- Geocode: 2403

Bang Nam Priao (Thai: บางน้ำเปรี้ยว, pronounced [bāːŋ ná(ː)m prîa̯w]) is the northwesternmost district (amphoe) of Chachoengsao province, central Thailand.

== History ==
The old location of the district center of Bang Nam Priao was in Ban Ton Samrong, Bang Khanak Subdistrict. In 1905 the government built the first district office in Bang Nam Priao. In 1952 the government built a new office on the north bank of Khlong Bang Khanak (the lower reaches of the Khlong Saen Saeb). The present district office was built in 1997.

== Etymology & population ==
Its name, "Bang Nam Priao", literally means "the place where the water tastes sour". It is said that in the past the soil in this area was naturally acidic, which caused the water to have a sour taste as well.

The population of Bang Nam Priao is a mix of people of various races and religions, including Thai Buddhists, Thai Chinese, Muslims, Mons and Christians.

== Geography ==
Neighbouring districts are (from the southeast clockwise): Khlong Khuean, Mueang Chachoengsao of Chachoengsao Province; Nong Chok of Bangkok; Lam Luk Ka of Pathum Thani province; Ongkharak of Nakhon Nayok province; and Ban Sang of Prachinburi province.

The important water resources are the Bang Pakong River and Khlong Saen Saeb.

== Administration ==
=== Central administration ===
Bang Nam Priao is divided into 10 subdistricts (tambons), which are further subdivided into 148 administrative villages (mubans).

No.	Name	Thai	Villages	Pop.
1.	Bang Nam Priao	บางน้ำเปรี้ยว	16	9,175
2.	Bang Khanak	บางขนาก	12	5,516
3.	Singto Thong	สิงโตทอง	8	5,925
4.	Mon Thong	หมอนทอง	11	10,380
5.	Bueng Nam Rak	บึงน้ำรักษ์	15	8,525
6.	Don Ko Ka	ดอนเกาะกา	14	8,582
7.	Yothaka	โยธะกา	13	6,493
8.	Don Chimphli	ดอนฉิมพลี	19	14,197
9.	Sala Daeng	ศาลาแดง	22	10,031
10.	Phrong Akat	โพรงอากาศ	18	9,196

=== Local administration ===
There are six subdistrict municipalities (thesaban tambon) in the district:

- Khlong Saen Saep (Thai: เทศบาลตำบลคลองแสนแสบ) consisting of parts of subdistrict Bang Khanak.
- Don Chimphli (Thai: เทศบาลตำบลดอนฉิมพลี) consisting of parts of subdistrict Don Chimphli.
- Bang Khanak (Thai: เทศบาลตำบลบางขนาก) consisting of parts of subdistrict Bang Khanak.
- Bang Nam Priao (Thai: เทศบาลตำบลบางน้ำเปรี้ยว) consisting of parts of subdistricts Bang Nam Priao and Phrong Akat.
- Sala Daeng (Thai: เทศบาลตำบลศาลาแดง) consisting of parts of subdistrict Sala Daeng.
- Don Ko Ka (Thai: เทศบาลตำบลดอนเกาะกา) consisting of subdistrict Don Ko Ka.

There are eight subdistrict administrative organizations (SAO) in the district:

- Bang Nam Priao (Thai: องค์การบริหารส่วนตำบลบางน้ำเปรี้ยว) consisting of parts of subdistrict Bang Nam Priao.
- Singto Thong (Thai: องค์การบริหารส่วนตำบลสิงโตทอง) consisting of subdistrict Singto Thong.
- Mon Thong (Thai: องค์การบริหารส่วนตำบลหมอนทอง) consisting of subdistrict Mon Thong.
- Bueng Nam Rak (Thai: องค์การบริหารส่วนตำบลบึงน้ำรักษ์) consisting of subdistrict Bueng Nam Rak.
- Yothaka (Thai: องค์การบริหารส่วนตำบลโยธะกา) consisting of subdistrict Yothaka.
- Don Chimphli (Thai: องค์การบริหารส่วนตำบลดอนฉิมพลี) consisting of parts of subdistrict Don Chimphli.
- Sala Daeng (Thai: องค์การบริหารส่วนตำบลศาลาแดง) consisting of parts of subdistrict Sala Daeng.
- Phrong Akat (Thai: องค์การบริหารส่วนตำบลโพรงอากาศ) consisting of parts of subdistrict Phrong Akat.
