= Saraburi railway station =

Railway station in Pak Phriao, Thailand

Coordinates: 14.5272°N 100.9169°E

Saraburi สระบุรี
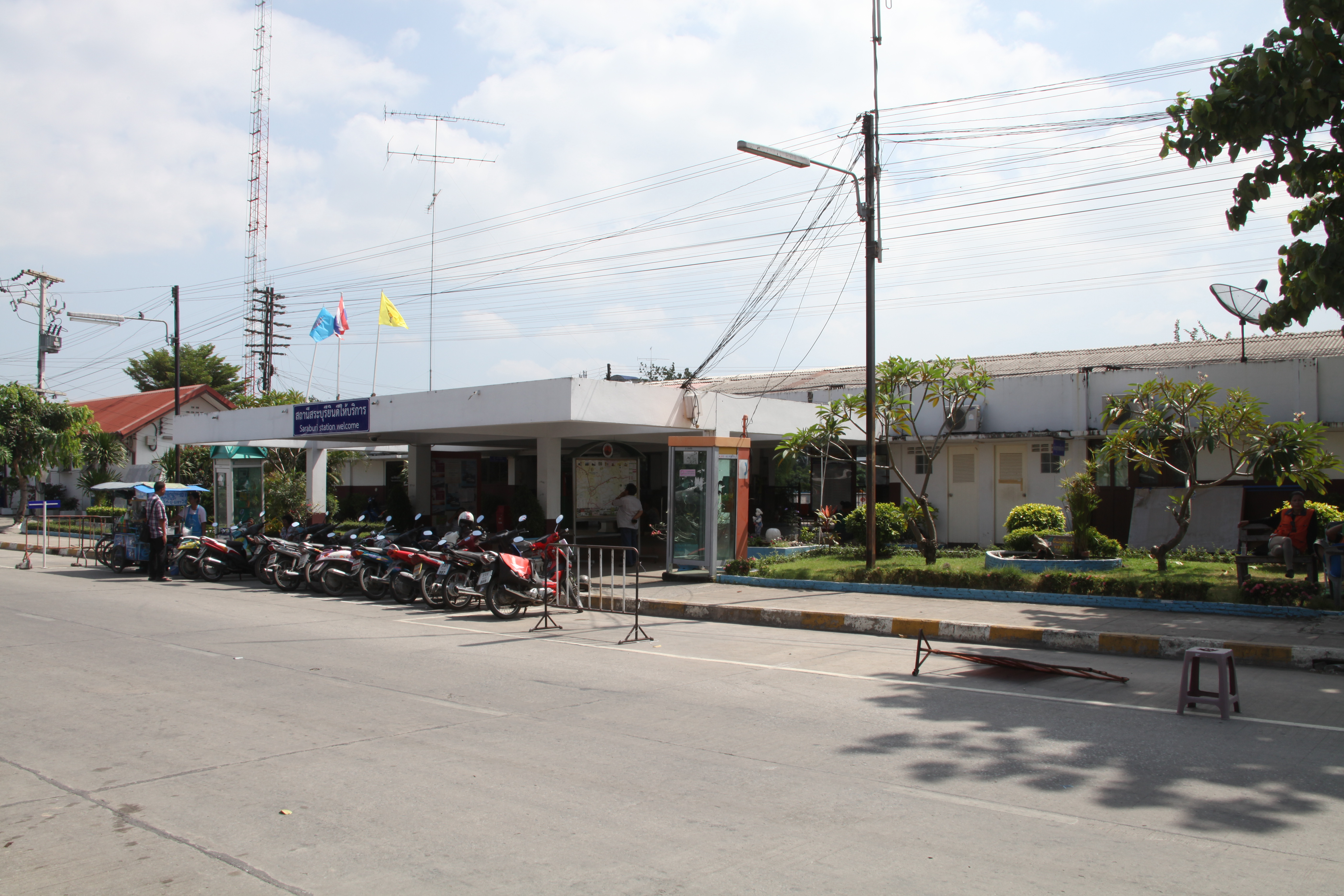

General information
- Location: Phahon Yothin 6 Road, Pak Priaw Subdistrict, Mueang Saraburi District; Saraburi Province; Thailand
- Operator: State Railway of Thailand
- Manager: Ministry of Transport
- Line: Ubon Ratchathani Main Line
- Platforms: 3
- Tracks: 3

Construction
- Structure type: At-grade
- Parking: Yes

Other information
- Station code: ะร.
- Classification: Class 1

History
- Opened: 1 May 1897
- Former names: Pak Priao

Services
Preceding station	State Railway of Thailand	Following station
Ban Pokpaek towards Hua Lamphong or Krung Thep Aphiwat	Northeastern Line	Nong Bua Junction towards Ubon Ratchathani or Khamsavath (Laos)
Location

Saraburi railway station is a railway station in the Pak Priao Sub-district, Saraburi City, Saraburi. It is a class 1 railway station 113.2 km (70.3 mi) from Bangkok railway station. It was opened on May 1, 1897 as part of the Northeastern Line Ayutthaya–Kaeng Khoi Junction section.
