= Si Mahosot district =

Si Mahosot ศรีมโหสถ
- District
- District location in Prachinburi province
- Coordinates: 13°52′54″N 101°24′24″E
- Country: Thailand
- Province: Prachinburi
- Seat: Khok Pip

Area
  - Total: 130.830 km^{2} (50.514 sq mi)

Population (2005)
  - Total: 18,137
  - Density: 138.6/km^{2} (359/sq mi)
- Time zone: UTC+7 (ICT)
- Postal code: 25190
- Geocode: 2509

Si Mahosot (Thai: ศรีมโหสถ, pronounced [sǐː mā.hǒː.sòt]) is a district (amphoe) of Prachinburi province, eastern Thailand. It may also be spelled Sri Mahosot. The district was created in 1970 as the minor district of Khok Pip, made a full district in 1977 and given its present name in 1993.

It holds the ancient town of Si Mahosot, also called Dong Si Maha Phot, whose religious character in the seventh and eighth centuries has been disputed. Imported Tang ceramics, Persian Gulf turquoise-glazed earthenware and a fragment of a Tang coin have been recovered there.

== Geography ==
Neighboring districts are (from the west clockwise): Ban Sang, Mueang Prachinburi and Si Maha Phot of Prachinburi Province; and Phanom Sarakham of Chachoengsao province.

== History ==
The minor district (king amphoe) Khok Pip was established on 15 February 1970, when the three tambons, Khok Pip, Khu Lam Phan, and Phai Cha Lueat were split off from Si Maha Phot district. It was upgraded to a full district on 13 April 1977, and renamed Si Mahosot on 3 June 1993.

The ancient town of Si Mahosot, also known as Dong Si Maha Phot, has been read as the centre of the Hindu half of a religious division of the Chao Phraya valley, proposed by Srisakra Vallibhotama. Nicolas Revire rejects that division and cites textual, epigraphic and material evidence for Buddhists in the region in the seventh and eighth centuries. Imported goods are recorded from the town. Sherds of Tang ceramics and of Persian Gulf turquoise-glazed earthenware have been reported, and a fragment of a Tang coin was recovered at monument 86, of a coinage introduced between 621 and 665 and current until 907. Patcharaporn Ngernkerd and colleagues make the town one of four central towns in a survey of fifteen moated sites of eastern Thailand, measuring 1.06 km² within its moat, and the point of highest density of ancient remains in the region. Three temples, monuments 22, 25 and 86, stand inside the moat, while the Buddhist monuments at Phu Khao Thong, Wat Si Mahapho and Ban Sra Makeau lie outside it. They place the town on a former shoreline of the Gulf of Thailand, occupied since at least the sixth century. Oval clay bars with incised decoration of a type recorded here have also been found in two burials at Wat Chom Chuen in Chaliang, on the upper Yom, dated to the sixth or seventh century.

== Administration ==
The district is divided into four sub-districts (tambons), which are further subdivided into 24 villages (mubans). Khok Pip is a township (thesaban tambon) which covers parts of tambon Khok Pip. There are a further three tambon administrative organizations (TAO).

| No. | Name | Thai name | Villages | Pop. |
|---|---|---|---|---|
| 1. | Khok Pip | โคกปีบ | 9 | 9,090 |
| 2. | Khok Thai | โคกไทย | 7 | 6,000 |
| 3. | Khu Lam Phan | คู้ลำพัน | 4 | 1,193 |
| 4. | Phai Cha Lueat | ไผ่ชะเลือด | 4 | 1,854 |
