= Chaophraya Abhaibhubejhr Hospital =

Hospital in Prachinburi, Thailand

Chaophraya Abhaibhubejhr Hospital โรงพยาบาลเจ้าพระยาอภัยภูเบศร
- The Ministry of Public Health Health District 6

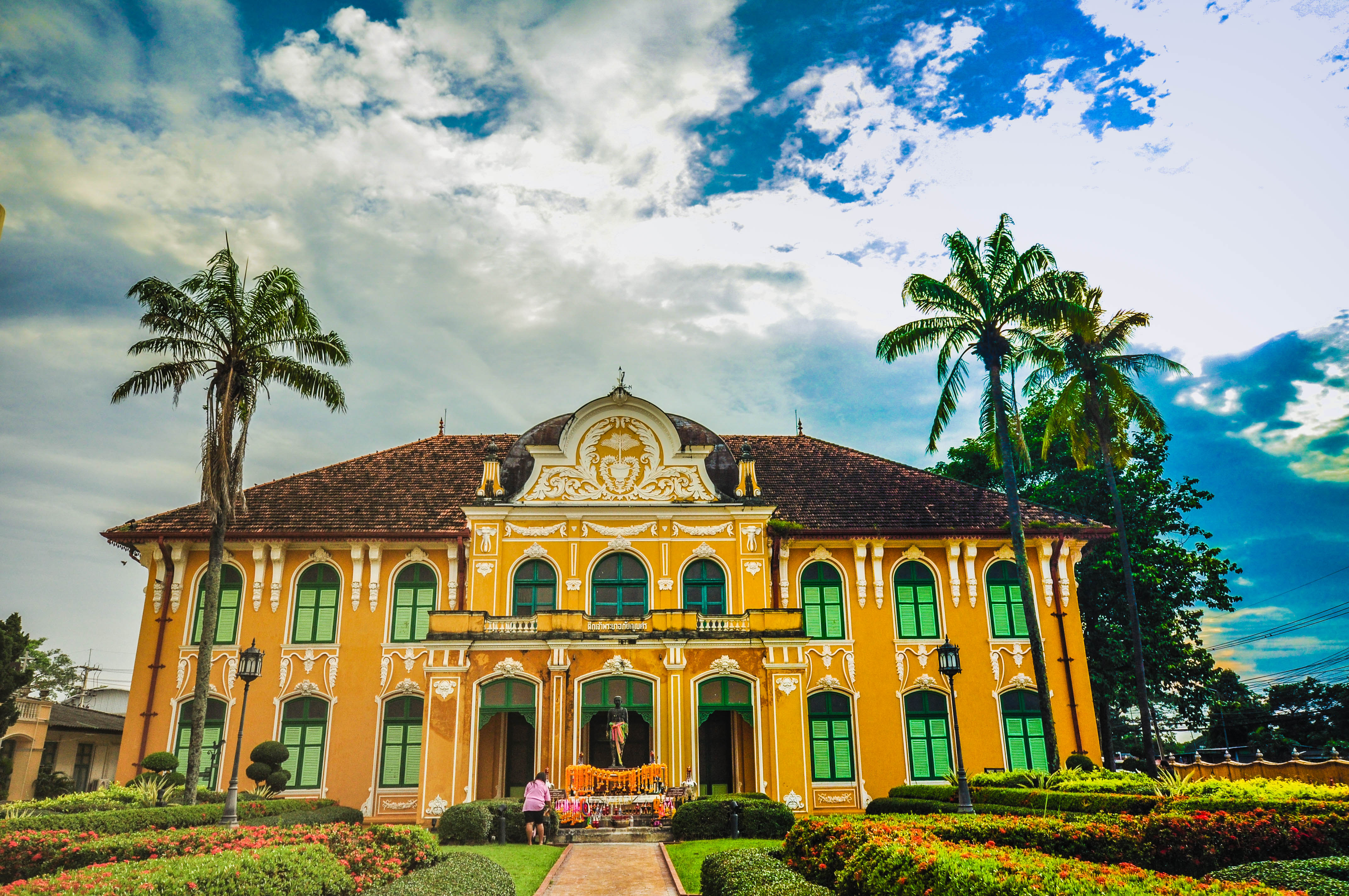
- Thai Traditional Medicine Museum Building

Geography
- Location: Tha Ngam Sub-district, Mueang Prachinburi District, Prachinburi 25000, Thailand
- Coordinates: 14.054543°N 101.395755°E

Organisation
- Type: Regional
- Affiliated university: Faculty of Medicine, Burapha University

Services
- Beds: 486

History
- Former name: Prachinburi Hospital
- Opened: 1941

Links
- Website: www.cpa.go.th
- Lists: Hospitals in Thailand

Chaophraya Abhaibhubejhr Hospital (Thai: โรงพยาบาลเจ้าพระยาอภัยภูเบศร) is the main hospital of Prachinburi Province, Thailand, and is classified by the Ministry of Public Health as a regional hospital. It has a CPIRD (Collaborative Project to Increase Production of Rural Doctors) Medical Education Center which trains doctors of the Faculty of Medicine, Burapha University. The hospital is also known for its first building which was constructed in 1909 in Baroque architecture with stucco, and currently houses the "Thai Traditional Medicine Museum".

It is also a leading traditional Thai medicine hospital and plans to develop into a major hub in ASEAN. The hospital operates the Abhaibhubejhr Day Spa, Abhaibhubejhr Osot (lit. 'Abhaibhubejhr Pharmacy') and provides Thai massage services during the day.

== History ==
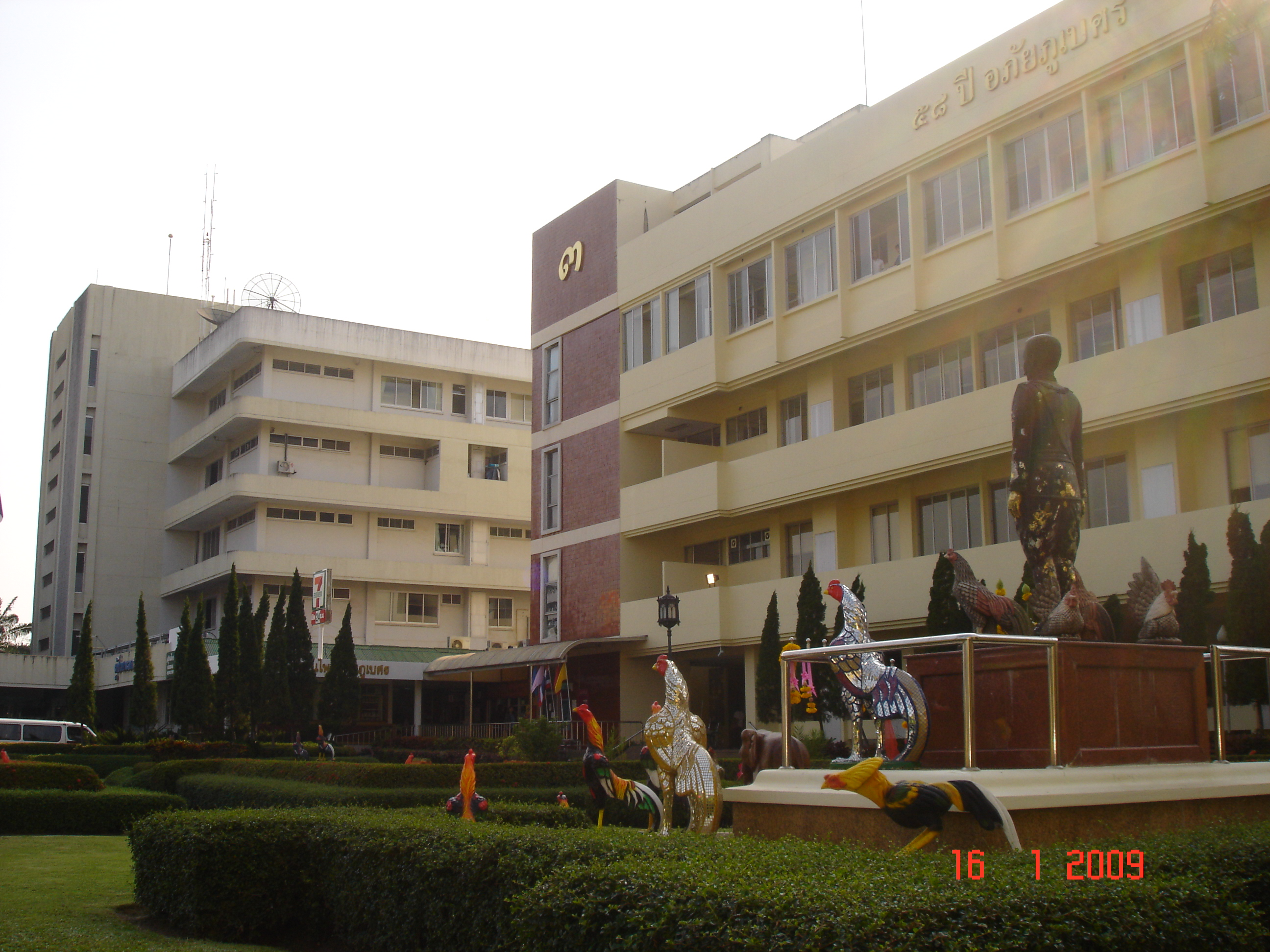
Chaophraya Abhaibhubejhr Hospital

In 1909, Chao Phraya Abhaibhubejhr (Choom Abhaiwongse), royal commissioner of Monthon Burapha and the Governor of Phra Tabong Province, ordered the construction of the building by the French architectural company, Howard Erskine, to resemble the governor's residence in Battambang. The purpose was to serve as a royal residence for King Chulalongkorn in the event he visited Prachinburi Province. King Chulalongkorn died in 1910 before it was completed. It was used during the reign of King Vajiravudh instead and was bestowed as a wedding gift to the king and Princess Suvadhana. Following his exile in England, the land was donated to the 2nd Military District, Prachinburi Province to build Prachinburi Hospital. Until 1943 when road access was provided, the hospital was accessible only by water. The hospital was renamed "Chao Phraya Abhaibhubejhr Hospital" on 20 June 1966 and came under the patronage of both Princess Suvadhana and her daughter, Princess Bejaratana.

In 1990, the Chao Phraya Abhaibhubejhr Building was registered as an ancient monument by the Fine Arts Department of the Ministry of Culture. In 1994, the building was significantly refurbished and The Thai Traditional Medicine Museum was set up inside the building.

== See also ==
- Healthcare in Thailand
- Hospitals in Thailand
- List of hospitals in Thailand
