= Ban Pokpaek railway station =

Railway station in Thailand

Ban Pokpaek บ้านป๊อกแป๊ก
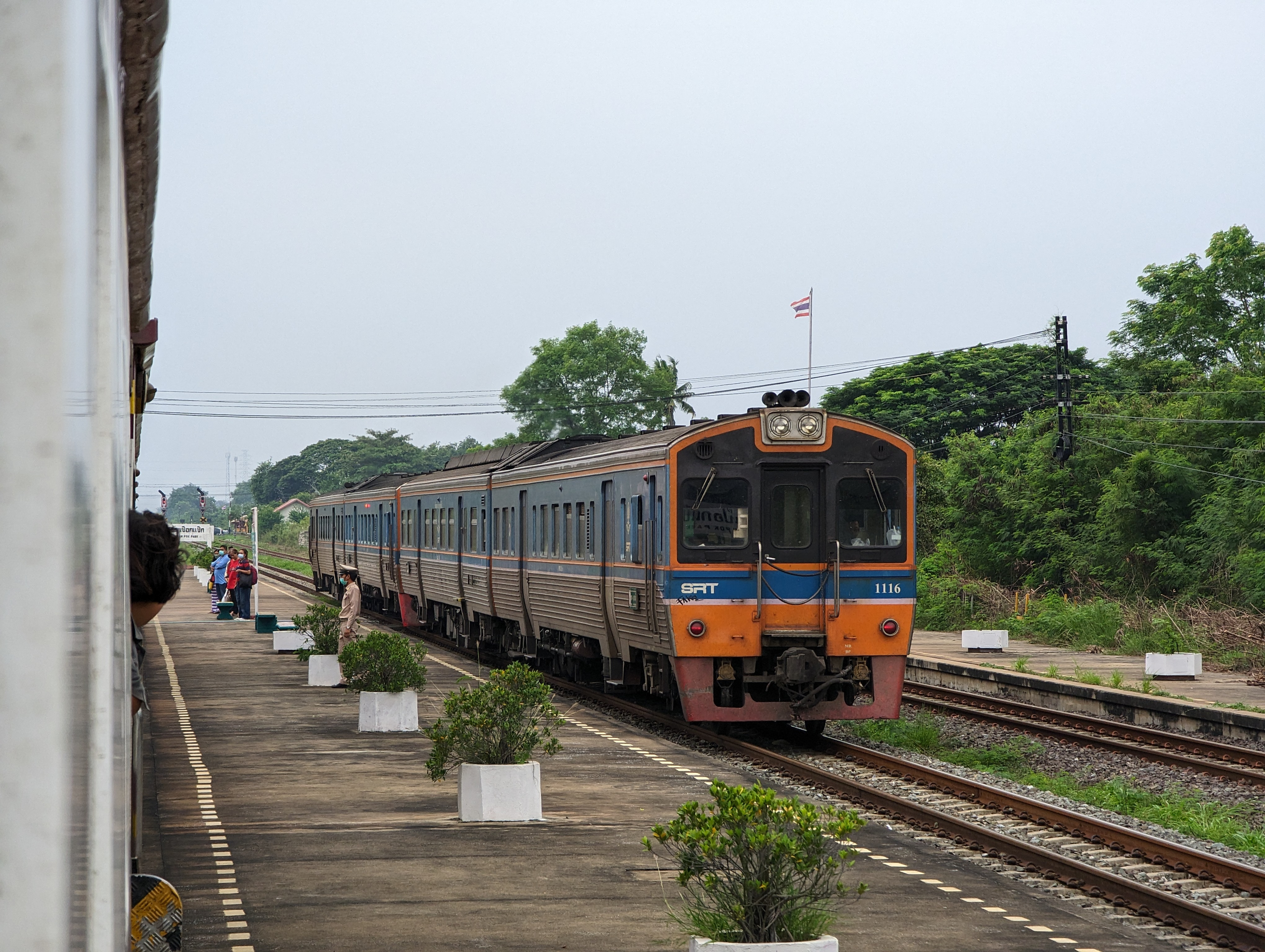

General information
- Location: Khok Sawang Subdistrict, Nong Saeng District; Saraburi Province; Thailand
- Coordinates: 14.5222°N 100.8643°E
- Operator: State Railway of Thailand
- Line: Ubon Ratchathani Main Line
- Platforms: 4
- Tracks: 4

Construction
- Structure type: At-grade
- Parking: Yes
- Cycle facilities: Yes

Other information
- Station code: ปป.
- Classification: Class 1

Services
Preceding station	State Railway of Thailand	Following station
Nong Sida towards Hua Lamphong or Krung Thep Aphiwat	Northeastern Line	Saraburi towards Ubon Ratchathani or Khamsavath (Laos)
Location

Ban Pokpaek station (Thai: สถานีบ้านป๊อกแป๊ก) is a railway station located in Khok Sawang Subdistrict, Saraburi City, Saraburi. It is a class 1 railway station located 107.151 km (66.6 mi) from Bangkok railway station. It is the location of a petroleum oil terminal, operated by the Thai Petroleum Pipeline Co Ltd., a subsidiary of PTT.
