= Nong Sida railway station =

Railway station in Thailand

Coordinates: 14.5162°N 100.8250°E

Nong Sida หนองสีดา
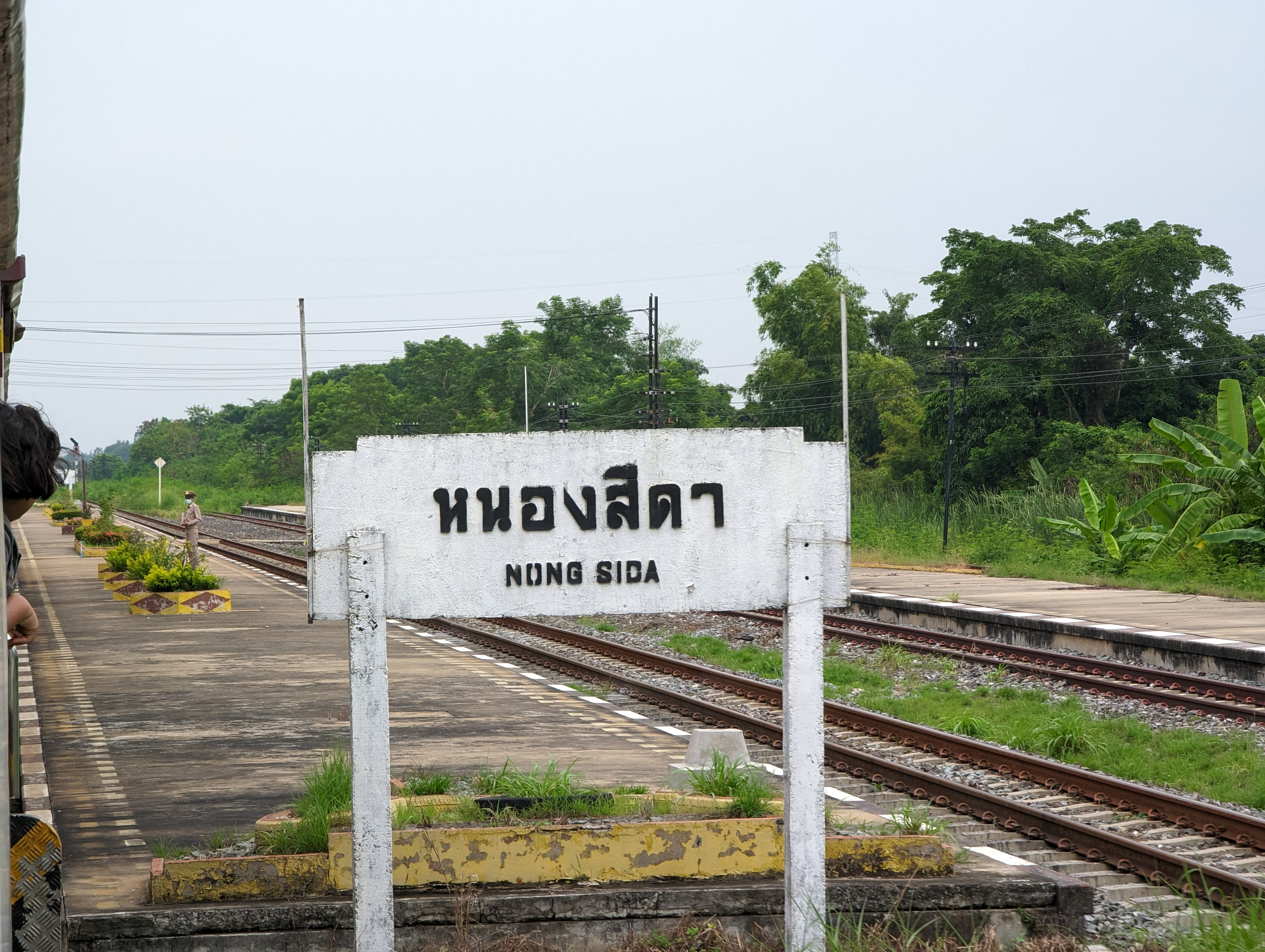

General information
- Location: Nong Sida Subdistrict, Nong Saeng District; Saraburi Province; Thailand
- Operator: State Railway of Thailand
- Manager: Ministry of Transport
- Line: Ubon Ratchathani Main Line
- Distance: 103.346 km (64.2 mi) from Bangkok
- Platforms: 3
- Tracks: 3

Construction
- Structure type: At-grade

Other information
- Station code: นด.
- Classification: Class 3

Services
Preceding station	State Railway of Thailand	Following station
Nong Saeng towards Hua Lamphong or Krung Thep Aphiwat	Northeastern Line	Ban Pokpaek towards Ubon Ratchathani or Khamsavath (Laos)
Location

Nong Sida railway station is a railway station located in Nong Sida Subdistrict, Nong Saeng District, Saraburi. It is a class 3 railway station located 103.346 km (64.2 mi) from Bangkok railway station.
