= Weerapun Dee-on =

Thai civil servant

- วีระพันธ์ ดีอ่อน

Governor of Prachinburi Province
- Incumbent
- Assumed office 2024
- Preceded by: Ronnarong Nakornjinda

Weerapun Dee-on (Thai: วีระพันธ์ ดีอ่อน) is a Thai civil servant, serving as the Governor of Prachinburi Province.

== Chinese advisor scandal ==
On 21 April 2025, Weerapun signed an order appointing five Thai nationals, and Jungcheng Zhu, a Chinese national, as his advisors. Zhu's appointment was revealed on a popular investigave facebook page, CSI LA.

Weerapun faced strong criticism for his appointment of Zhu, with critics citing potential foreign influence. Interior Minister Anutin Charnvirakul described the appointment as inappropriate.

On 29 April, Weerapun rescinded the order appointing Zhu. On 30 April, Thailand's Minister of Interior ordered all provincial governors to provide the details of appointed advisors.
