= Nong Kuai railway station =

Railway station in Don Ya Nang, Thailand

Coordinates: 14.4736°N 100.7570°E

Nong Kuai หนองกวย
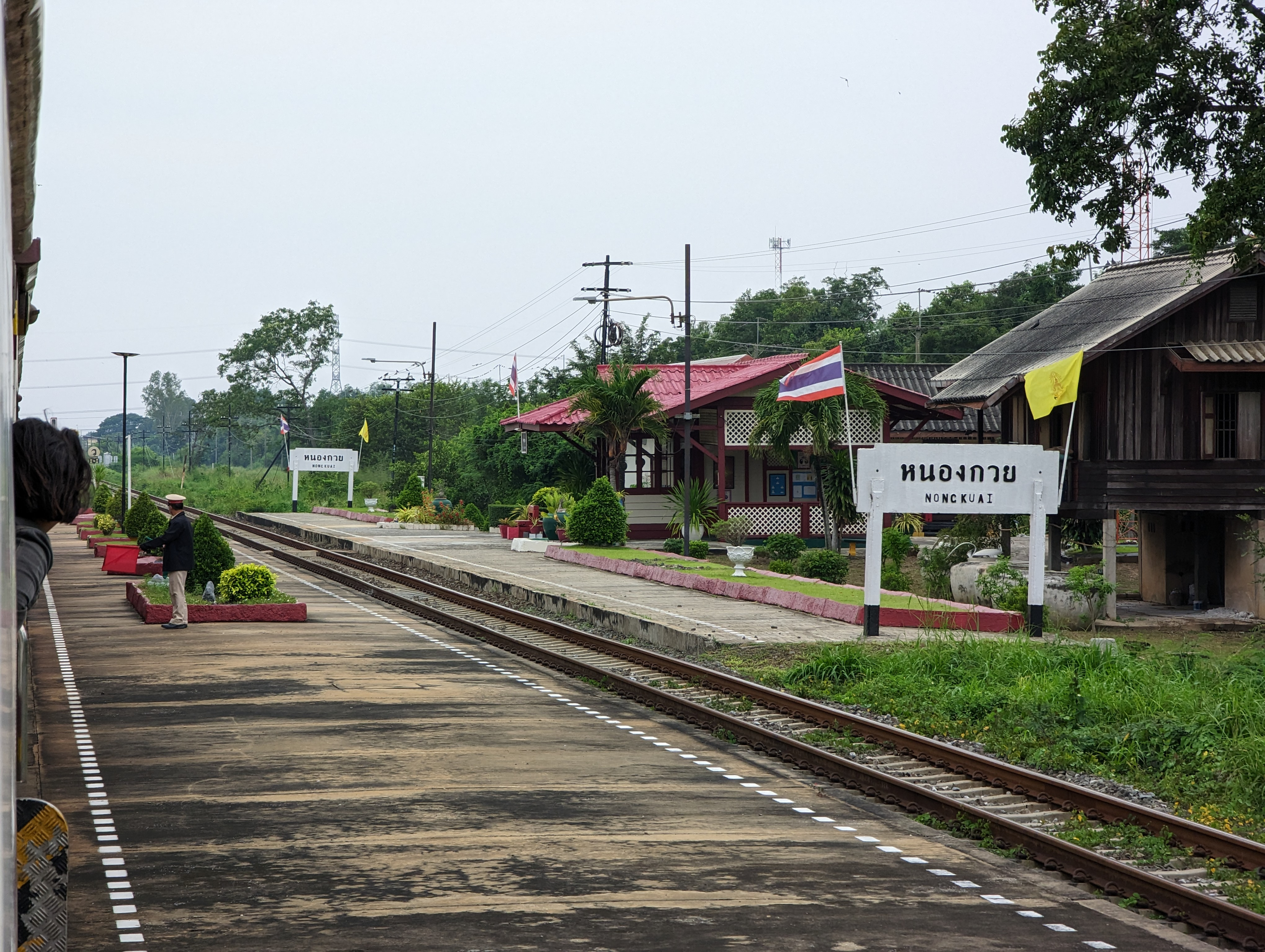

General information
- Location: Ban Nong Kuai, Don Ya Nang Subdistrict, Phachi District; Phra Nakhon Si Ayutthaya Province; Thailand
- Operator: State Railway of Thailand
- Manager: Ministry of Transport
- Line: Ubon Ratchathani Main Line
- Distance: 94.629 km (58.8 mi) from Bangkok
- Platforms: 3
- Tracks: 3

Construction
- Structure type: At-grade

Other information
- Station code: นก.
- Classification: Class 3

Services
Preceding station	State Railway of Thailand	Following station
Ban Phachi Junction towards Hua Lamphong or Krung Thep Aphiwat	Northeastern Line	Nong Saeng towards Ubon Ratchathani or Khamsavath (Laos)
Location

Nong Kuai railway station is a railway station located in Don Ya Nang Subdistrict, Phachi District, Phra Nakhon Si Ayutthaya Province. It is a class 3 railway station located 94.629 km (58.8 mi) from Bangkok railway station.
