= Prachantakham district =

Prachantakham ประจันตคาม
- District
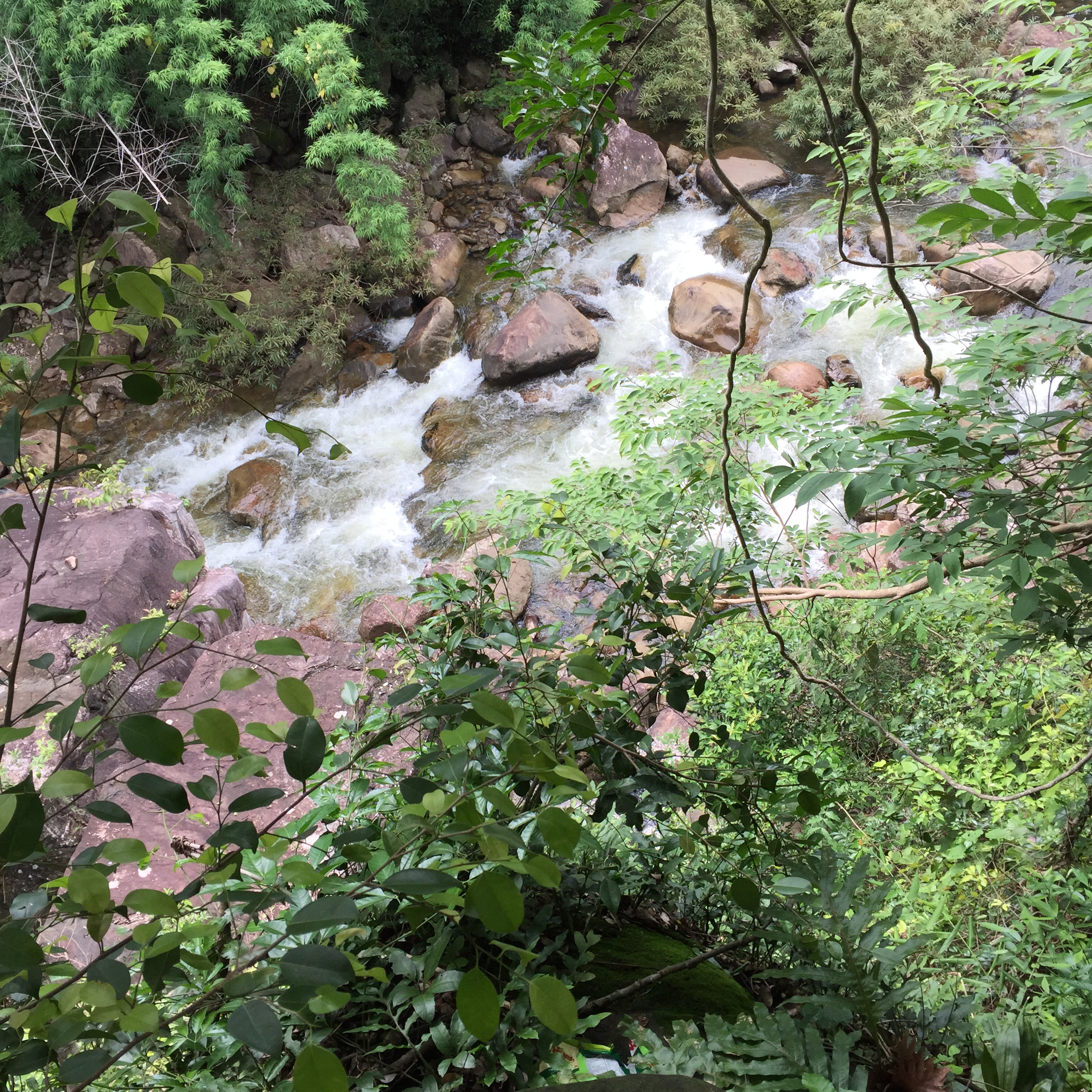
- Than Thip Waterfall, Tambon Bu Fai

- District location in Prachinburi province
- Coordinates: 14°3′53″N 101°30′55″E
- Country: Thailand
- Province: Prachinburi

Area
  - Total: 904.005 km^{2} (349.038 sq mi)

Population (2023)
  - Total: 54,181
  - Density: 58.2/km^{2} (151/sq mi)
- Time zone: UTC+7 (ICT)
- Postal code: 25130
- Geocode: 2507

Prachantakham (Thai: ประจันตคาม, pronounced [prā.t͡ɕān.tā.kʰāːm]) is a district (amphoe) of Prachinburi province, eastern Thailand.

== Geography ==
Neighboring districts are (from the east clockwise): Na Di, Kabin Buri, Si Maha Phot, Mueang Prachinburi of Prachinburi Province; Pak Phli of Nakhon Nayok province; Pak Chong and Wang Nam Khiao of Nakhon Ratchasima province.

The Sankamphaeng Range mountains is in the northern section of this district.

== Administration ==
The district is divided into nine sub-districts (tambons), which are further subdivided into 106 villages (mubans). Prachantakham is a township (thesaban tambon) which covers parts of tambon Prachantakham. There are a further nine tambon administrative organizations (TAO).

No.	Name	Thai name	Villages	Pop.
1.	Prachantakham	ประจันตคาม	11	8,977
2.	Ko Loi	เกาะลอย	7	4,704
3.	Ban Hoi	บ้านหอย	10	4,479
4.	Nong Saeng	หนองแสง	6	3,394
5.	Dong Bang	ดงบัง	10	4,054
6.	Kham Tanot	คำโตนด	18	7,054
7.	Bu Fai	บุฝ้าย	13	4,859
8.	Nong Kaeo	หนองแก้ว	12	4,651
9.	Pho Ngam	โพธิ์งาม	19	10,398
