= Nong Saeng railway station =

Railway station in Nong Saeng, Thailand

Coordinates: 14.4912°N 100.7840°E

Nong Saeng หนองแซง
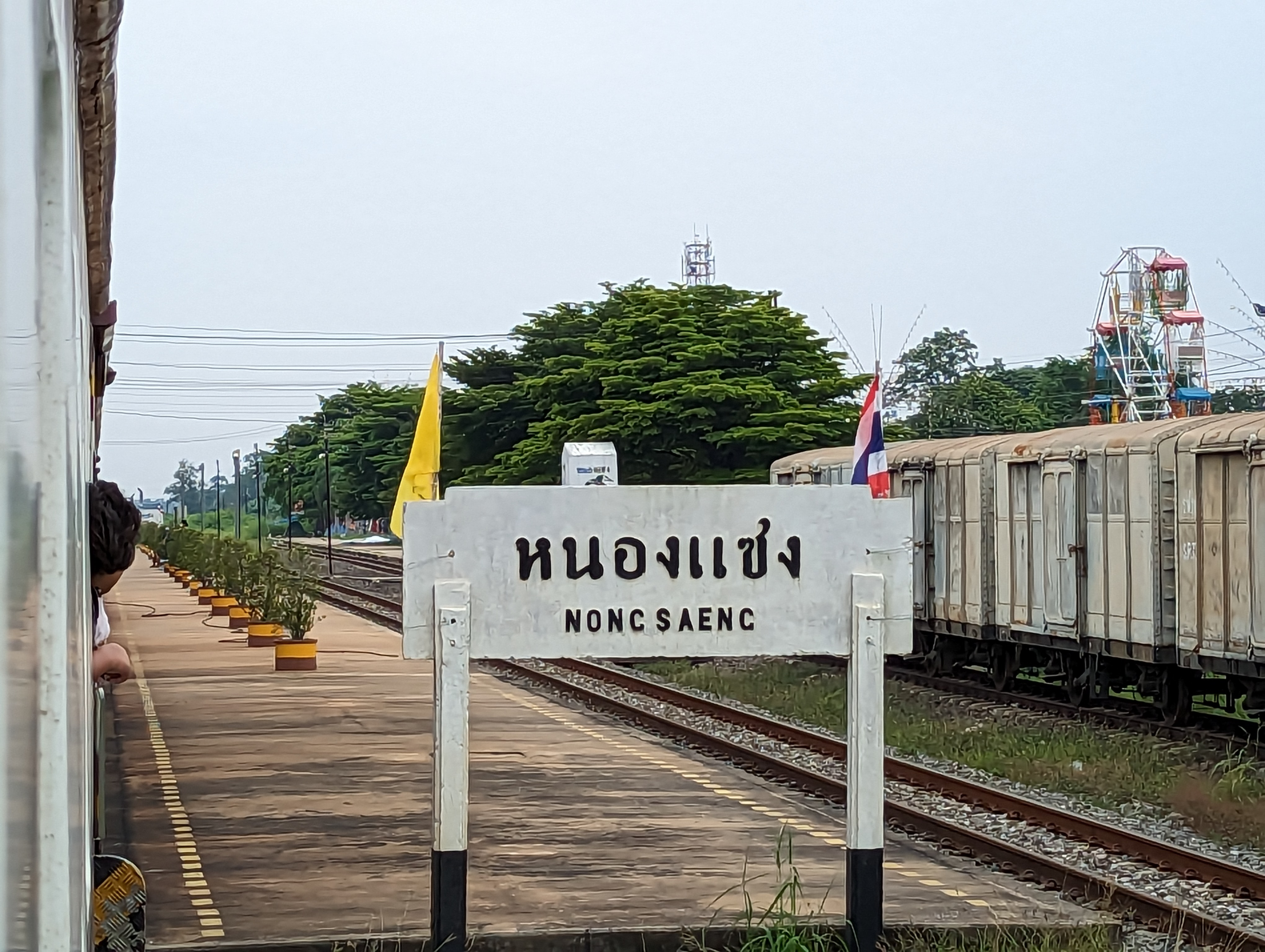

General information
- Location: Thetsaban 1 Road, Nong Saeng Subdistrict, Nong Saeng District; Saraburi Province; Thailand
- Operator: State Railway of Thailand
- Manager: Ministry of Transport
- Line: Ubon Ratchathani Main Line
- Platforms: 3
- Tracks: 3

Construction
- Structure type: At-grade

Other information
- Station code: นซ.
- Classification: Class 2

Services
Preceding station	State Railway of Thailand	Following station
Nong Kuai towards Hua Lamphong or Krung Thep Aphiwat	Northeastern Line	Nong Sida towards Ubon Ratchathani or Khamsavath (Laos)
Location

Nong Saeng railway station is a railway station located in Nong Saeng Subdistrict, Nong Saeng District, Saraburi. It is a class 2 railway station located 98.045 km (60.9 mi) from Bangkok railway station.
