= Prachinburi =

- Town
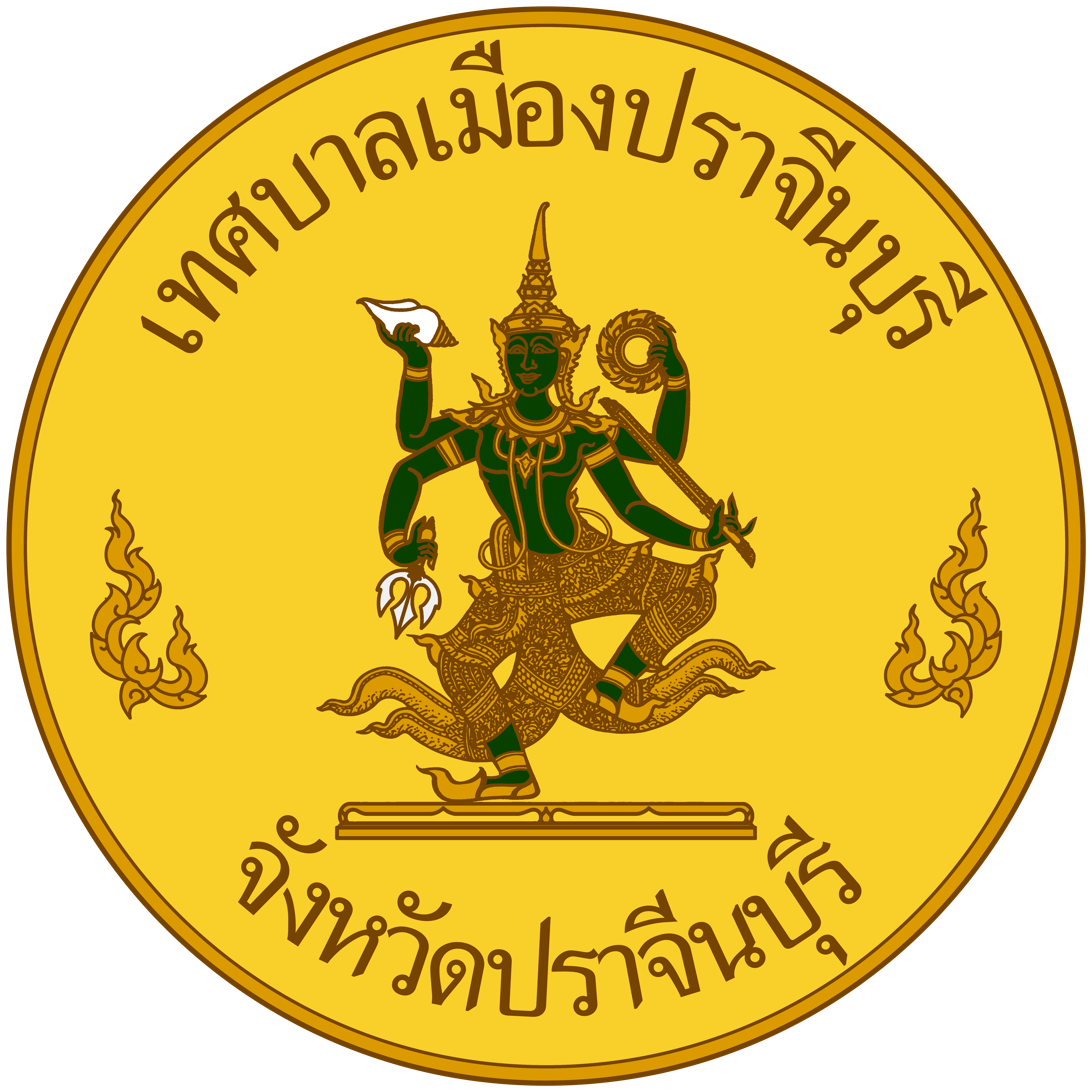
- Seal

- Location within Thailand
- Coordinates: 14°03′24″N 101°22′26″E
- Country: Thailand
- Provinces: Prachinburi Province
- District: Mueang Prachinburi District
- Elevation: 5 m (16 ft)

Population (2000)
  - Total: 25,157
- Time zone: UTC+7 (ICT)

Prachinburi (Thai: ปราจีนบุรี, RTGS: Prachin Buri, pronounced [prāː.t͡ɕīːn bū.rīː]) is a town (thesaban mueang) in central Thailand, capital of Prachinburi Province. It covers the entire tambon Na Mueang of the Mueang Prachinburi District (city district). As of 2000, the population of the town was 25,157.

== Geography ==
Prachinburi is on the banks of the Prachinburi River, about 100 kilometres (62 mi) northeast of Bangkok. Most of the city's environs are flats alluvial plains, but the foothills of the Sankamphaeng Range begin to rise about 10 kilometres (6 mi) to the north.

== Climate ==
Prachinburi has a tropical savanna climate (Köppen climate classification Aw). Winters are dry and very warm. Temperatures rise until April, which is very hot with the average daily maximum at 36.8 °C (98.2 °F). The monsoon season runs from late April through October, with heavy rain and somewhat cooler temperatures during the day, although nights remain warm.

Climate data for Prachinburi (1991–2020, extremes 1951–present)
Month	Jan	Feb	Mar	Apr	May	Jun	Jul	Aug	Sep	Oct	Nov	Dec	Year
Record high °C (°F)	37.9 (100.2)	39.1 (102.4)	40.6 (105.1)	42.2 (108.0)	41.3 (106.3)	38.4 (101.1)	36.5 (97.7)	36.2 (97.2)	36.0 (96.8)	36.0 (96.8)	38.0 (100.4)	36.8 (98.2)	42.2 (108.0)
Mean daily maximum °C (°F)	33.3 (91.9)	35.0 (95.0)	36.4 (97.5)	36.9 (98.4)	35.8 (96.4)	34.4 (93.9)	33.5 (92.3)	33.2 (91.8)	33.1 (91.6)	33.2 (91.8)	33.2 (91.8)	32.6 (90.7)	34.2 (93.6)
Daily mean °C (°F)	27.0 (80.6)	28.4 (83.1)	29.7 (85.5)	30.4 (86.7)	29.8 (85.6)	29.1 (84.4)	28.6 (83.5)	28.4 (83.1)	28.3 (82.9)	28.3 (82.9)	28.0 (82.4)	26.8 (80.2)	28.6 (83.4)
Mean daily minimum °C (°F)	21.4 (70.5)	23.0 (73.4)	24.7 (76.5)	25.6 (78.1)	25.8 (78.4)	25.5 (77.9)	25.1 (77.2)	25.0 (77.0)	24.9 (76.8)	24.8 (76.6)	23.5 (74.3)	21.5 (70.7)	24.2 (75.6)
Record low °C (°F)	10.2 (50.4)	14.5 (58.1)	15.3 (59.5)	18.0 (64.4)	21.5 (70.7)	22.2 (72.0)	22.0 (71.6)	22.2 (72.0)	21.5 (70.7)	19.0 (66.2)	13.8 (56.8)	10.8 (51.4)	10.2 (50.4)
Average precipitation mm (inches)	7.7 (0.30)	13.7 (0.54)	50.5 (1.99)	105.0 (4.13)	200.8 (7.91)	219.5 (8.64)	268.8 (10.58)	356.8 (14.05)	367.2 (14.46)	146.3 (5.76)	25.0 (0.98)	3.4 (0.13)	1,764.7 (69.48)
Average precipitation days (≥ 1.0 mm)	0.8	1.3	3.6	6.6	12.1	14.6	16.2	18.0	18.2	10.7	2.2	0.6	104.9
Average relative humidity (%)	64.7	66.6	69.8	72.3	77.5	80.4	81.7	82.3	82.5	77.3	67.6	62.5	73.8
Mean monthly sunshine hours	263.5	211.9	201.5	204.0	155.0	114.0	117.8	117.8	108.0	182.9	219.0	260.4	2,155.8
Mean daily sunshine hours	8.5	7.5	6.5	6.8	5.0	3.8	3.8	3.8	3.6	5.9	7.3	8.4	5.9
Source 1: World Meteorological Organization
Source 2: Office of Water Management and Hydrology, Royal Irrigation Department (sun 1981–2010)(extremes)

== Transportation ==
The main road through Prachinburi is Highway 319. While Highway 319 does not lead directly to other major centers, along with Highway 33 it leads to Nakhon Nayok, and along with Routes 314 and 304 it leads to Bangkok.

Prachinburi is a station on the State Railway of Thailand's Eastern Line, 122 kilometres (76 mi) from Bangkok.

== Hospital ==
Chaophraya Abhaibhubejhr Hospital is a Thai traditional medicine center. It was built in 1909 for King Rama V on his next royal visit to Prachinburi, but the king never again visited. The building was named after the man who funded the construction, Chao Phraya Abhaibhubejhr, the governor of Prachinburi at the time. In 1994, Thailand's government renovated the Chao Phraya Abhaibhubejhr Building as a Thai traditional medical hub and museum. Chao Phraya Abhaibhubejhr Hospital is known for herbal products, traditional Thai medicine, and Thai massage. The brand of herbal medicines, cosmetics, toiletries, and elixirs is "Abhaibhubejhr".
