= Pak Phli district =

Pak Phli ปากพลี
- District
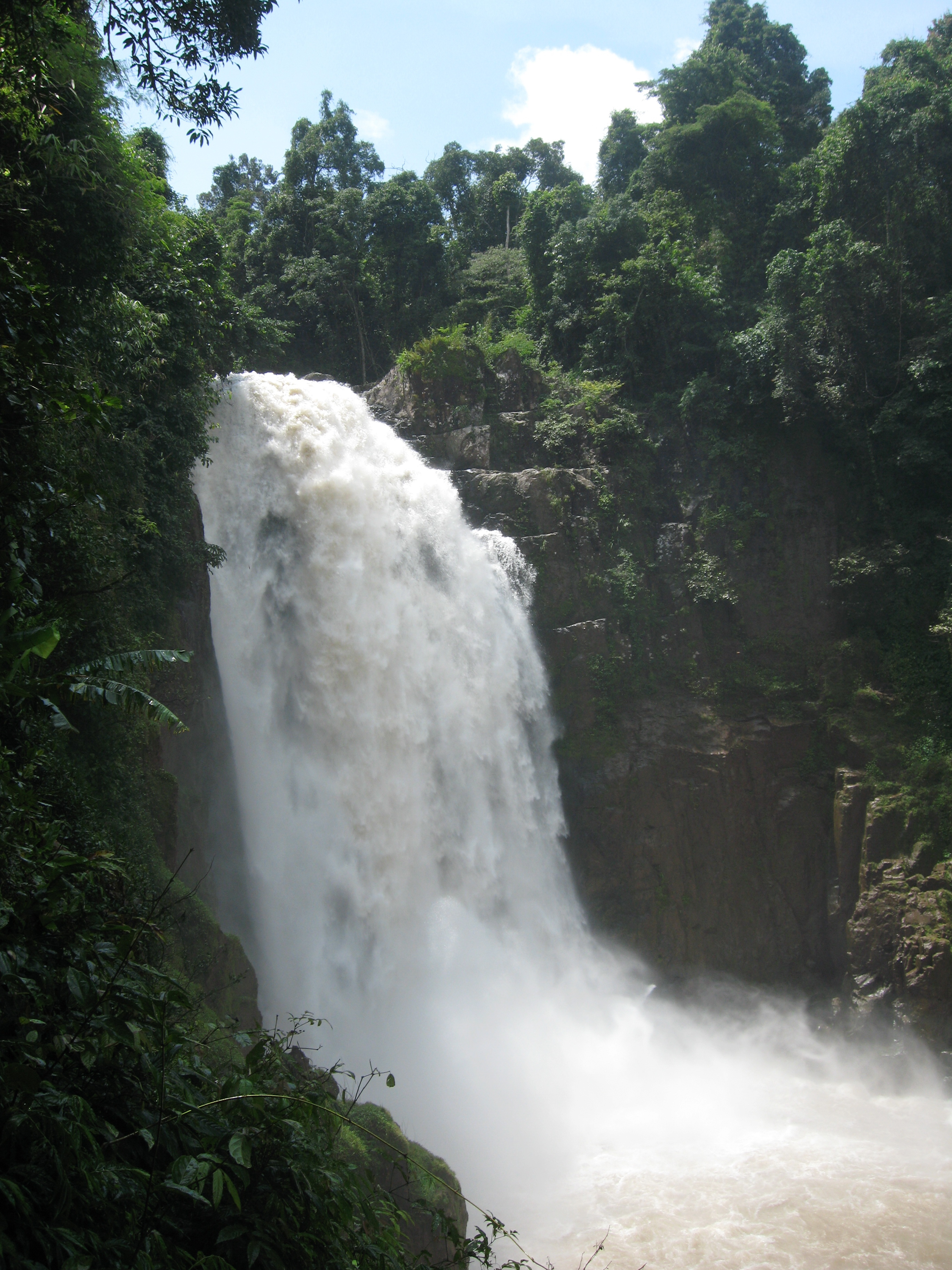
- Haew Narok Waterfall, a part of greater Khao Yai National Park

- District location in Nakhon Nayok province
- Country: Thailand
- Province: Nakhon Nayok
- Seat: Koh Wai

Area
  - Total: 519.1 km^{2} (200.4 sq mi)

Population (2023)
  - Total: 24,038
  - Density: 46/km^{2} (120/sq mi)
- Time zone: UTC+7 (ICT)
- Postal code: 26130
- Calling code: 037
- ISO 3166 code: TH-2602

Pak Phli (Thai: ปากพลี, pronounced [pàːk pʰlīː]) is a district (amphoe) in the eastern part of Nakhon Nayok province, central Thailand.

== History ==
Pak Phli district was established in 1893, then named Bung Rai (บุ่งไร่). In 1905 the district was renamed to Nong Pho (หนองโพธิ์). In the same year, the district office was moved to Ban Tha Daeng, Tambon Pak Phli, and the government renamed the district to Khao Yai, but in 1909 the district's name reverted to the current name, Pak Phli.

Around 1922 some people from Ban Tha Dan and Ban Tha Chai villages in Nakhon Nayok province built a settlement within the forest in the mountains of the Sankamphaeng Range. Up to 30 households cultivated the land. The area was formally recognized by the government and classified as Tambon Khao Yai within Pak Phli District. However, due to its location and distance from the authorities it became a refuge for criminals and fugitives. After an attempt to capture the fugitives in the area, in 1932 the villagers were relocated into the plains some 30 km away and the tambon status was cancelled. In 1959 the then-Prime Minister of Thailand, Marshall Sarit Thanarat, ordered the Ministry of Agriculture and the Ministry of the Interior to create a process whereby national parks could be established and Khao Yai National Park, established in 1962 in this area, would adopt the name of the former tambon.

Pak Phli, the name of the district, originated in the times when the locals still traveled by water. In the rainy season the water at the mouth of Khlong Yang was flowing fast, which caused many accidents. Thus the people built a shrine to commemorate the dead people and salute Deva, what in Thai is called Phli or Phli Kam (พลี or พลีกรรม). After that they called the canal Khlong Pak Phli. The name Pak Phli was then also used for the village and tambon.

== Geography ==
Neighboring districts are (from the west clockwise) Mueang Nakhon Nayok of Nakhon Nayok Province, Pak Chong of Nakhon Ratchasima province, Prachantakham, Mueang Prachin Buri and Ban Sang of Prachinburi province.

The Sankamphaeng Range mountainous area is in the northern section of this district.

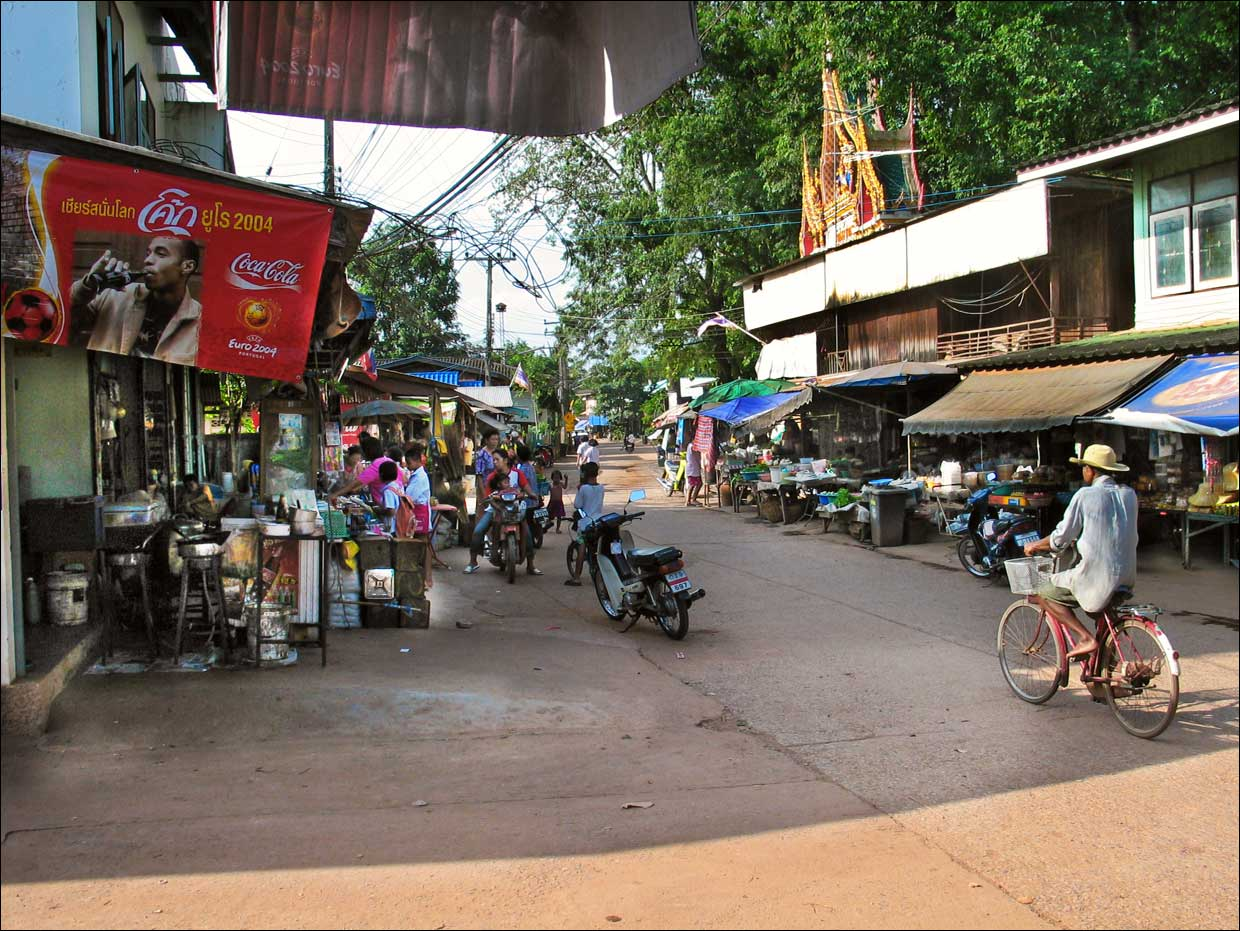
Pak Phli main road

== Administration ==
=== Central government ===
The district is divided into seven subdistricts (tambons), which are further subdivided into 51 villages (mubans)

Map with seven subdistricts

No.	Subdistricts	Thai	Villages	Pop.
1.	Koh Wai	เกาะหวาย	6	3,734
2.	Koh Pho	เกาะโพธิ์	7	2,828
3.	Pak Phli	ปากพลี	7	3,482
4.	Khok Kruat	โคกกรวด	7	3,084
5.	Tha Ruea	ท่าเรือ	8	3,845
6.	Nong Saeng	หนองแสง	9	3,219
7.	Na Hin Lat	นาหินลาด	7	3,846
		Total	51	24,038

=== Local government ===
As of December 2023 there is Koh Wai subdistrict municipality (thesaban tambon), which covers part of subdistrict Koh Wai. There are further seven subdistrict administrative organizations - SAO (ongkan borihan suan tambon - o bo tjo). Koh Wai SAO covers a part of subdistrict Koh Wai and the other six cover the whole subdistrict.

Subdistrict municipality	Pop.	website
Koh Wai	1,720	kohwaicity.go.th

Subdistrict adm.org.-SAO	Pop.	website
Na Hin Lat	3,846	nahinlat.go.th
Tha Ruea	3,845	tharue.go.th
Pak Phli	3,482	pakplee.go.th
Nong Saeng	3,219	nong-saeng.go.th
Khok Kruat	3,084	kokkruat.go.th
Koh Pho	2,828	kopho.go.th
Koh Wai	2,014	kowai.go.th

== Healthcare ==
=== Government hospitals ===
There is Pak Phli community hospital with 10 beds.

=== Health-promoting hospitals ===
There are total 9 health-promoting hospitals in the district, of which; one in Pak Phli, Khok Kruat, Tha Ruea, Na Hin Lat and Koh Wai and two in Koh Pho and Nong Saeng.

== Religion ==
There are thirty-nine Theravada Buddhist temples in the district.
Three in Pak Phli, four in Koh Pho and Na Hin Lat, five in Khok Kruat, six in Koh Wai and Tha Ruea and eleven in Nong Saeng.
