= Si Maha Phot district =

Si Maha Phot ศรีมหาโพธิ
- District
- District location in Prachinburi province
- Coordinates: 13°58′59″N 101°30′47″E
- Country: Thailand
- Province: Prachinburi

Area
  - Total: 407.1 km^{2} (157.2 sq mi)

Population (2005)
  - Total: 58,835
  - Density: 144.5/km^{2} (374/sq mi)
- Time zone: UTC+7 (ICT)
- Postal code: 25140
- Geocode: 2508

Si Maha Phot (Thai: ศรีมหาโพธิ, pronounced [sǐː mā.hǎː pʰôːt]) is a district (amphoe) in the southern part of Prachinburi province, eastern Thailand. The name may also be spelled Sri Maha Bodhi and honours the Bodhi tree (ต้นพระศรีมหาโพธิ์.)

== Geography ==
Neighbouring districts are (from the west clockwise): Si Mahosot, Mueang Prachinburi, Prachantakham, Kabin Buri of Prachinburi Province; Phanom Sarakham and Sanam Chai Khet of Chachoengsao province.

== Economy ==
Tambon Hua Wa in the district is the site of Rojana Industrial Park. Among other tenants of the park, Honda Automobile (Thailand) has established a 17.2-billion-baht plant there to manufacture sub-compact vehicles. The plant, opened in March 2016, has an initial production capacity of 60,000 vehicles per year. The plant is designed to build up to 120,000 vehicles per year.

== Environment ==
The air quality in the district in 2018 was the eighth worst in Thailand.

== Administration ==
The district is divided into 10 sub-districts (tambons), which are further subdivided into 91 villages (mubans). There are two townships (thesaban tambons): Si Maha Phot covers parts of tambons Si Maha Phot and Nong Phrong, and Krok Sombun covers parts of Krok Sombun. There are a further seven tambon administrative organizations (TAO).

No.	Name	Thai name	Villages	Pop.
1.	Si Maha Phot	ศรีมหาโพธิ	14	8,017
2.	Samphan	สัมพันธ์	7	1,831
3.	Ban Tham	บ้านทาม	8	3,300
4.	Tha Tum	ท่าตูม	10	9,945
5.	Bang Kung	บางกุ้ง	5	1,518
6.	Dong Krathong Yam	ดงกระทงยาม	7	4,078
7.	Nong Phrong	หนองโพรง	13	11,209
8.	Hua Wa	หัวหว้า	16	9,857
9.	Hat Yang	หาดยาง	4	1,244
10.	Krok Sombun	กรอกสมบูรณ์	7	7,836
