= Na Di district =

Na Di นาดี
- District
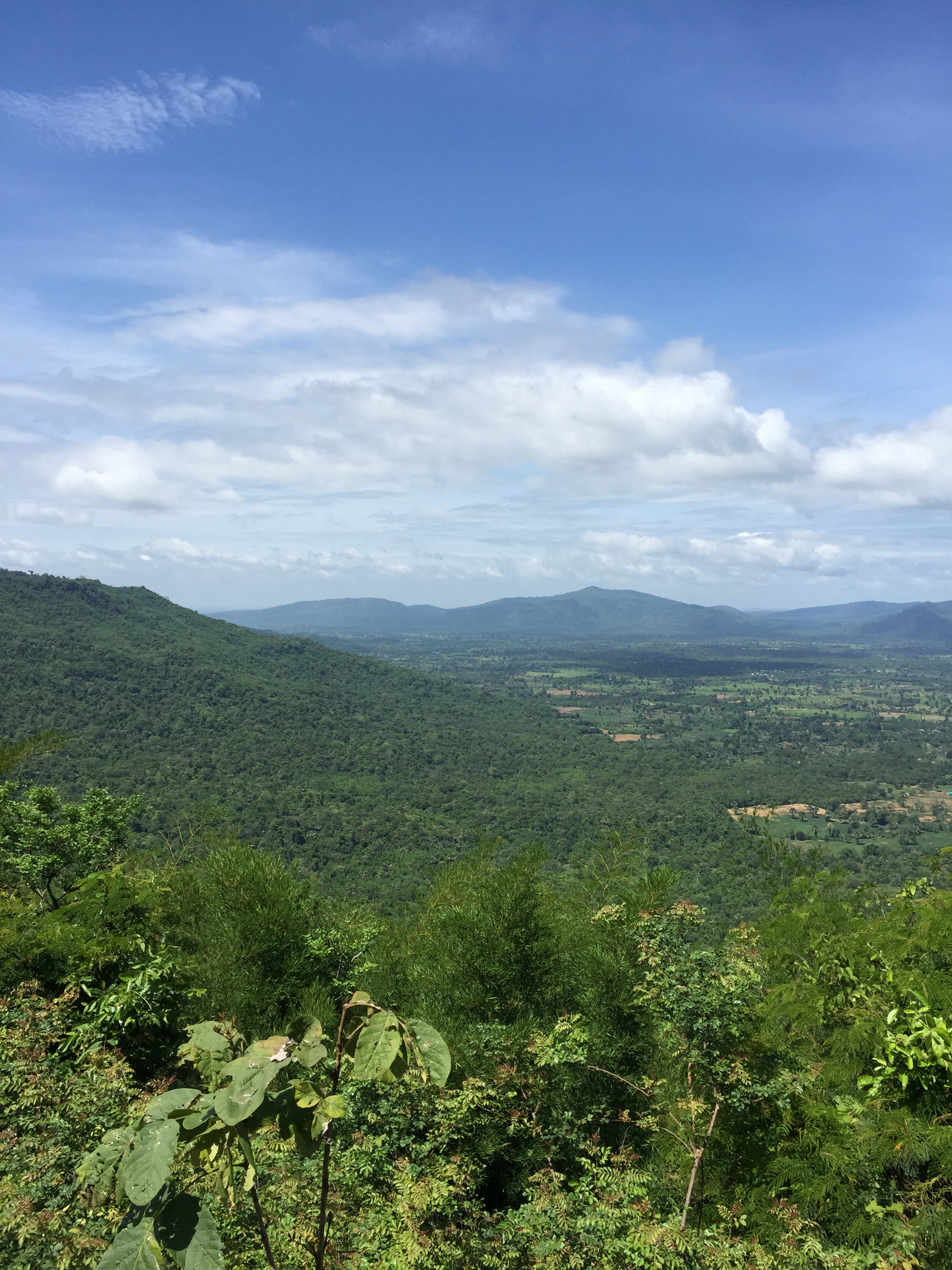

- District location in Prachinburi province
- Coordinates: 14°6′36″N 101°47′6″E
- Country: Thailand
- Province: Prachinburi
- Seat: Na Di

Area
  - Total: 1,168.1 km^{2} (451.0 sq mi)

Population (2005)
  - Total: 48,239
  - Density: 41.3/km^{2} (107/sq mi)
- Time zone: UTC+7 (ICT)
- Postal code: 25220
- Geocode: 2503

Na Di (Thai: นาดี, pronounced [nāː dīː]) is a district (amphoe) in the northeastern part of Prachinburi province, eastern Thailand.

== Geography ==
Neighboring districts are (from the south clockwise): Kabin Buri, Prachantakham of Prachinburi Province; Wang Nam Khiao and Khon Buri of Nakhon Ratchasima province; and Mueang Sa Kaeo of Sa Kaeo province.

The Sankamphaeng Range of mountains is in the northern section of this district.

== History ==
Originally the area of the district belonged to Kabin Buri district. When that district was considered to be too large, and to better counter the underground Thai communist party attacks, a minor district (king amphoe) Na Di was established on 15 July 1974 by splitting off tambons Na Di, Sam Phanta, Saphan Hin, and Thung Pho. It was upgraded to full district on 13 July 1981.

== Administration ==
The district is divided into six sub-districts (tambons), which are further subdivided into 63 villages (mubans). Na Di itself is a township (thesaban tambon) which covers parts of tambons Na Di and Samphan Ta. There are a further six tambon administrative organizations (TAO).

No.	Name	Thai name	Villages	Pop.
1.	Na Di	นาดี	15	11,186
2.	Samphan Ta	สำพันตา	9	8,384
3.	Saphan Hin	สะพานหิน	10	3,289
4.	Thung Pho	ทุ่งโพธิ์	7	6,703
5.	Kaeng Din So	แก่งดินสอ	12	10,150
6.	Bu Phram	บุพราหมณ์	10	8,527
