= Ban Sang district =

Ban Sang บ้านสร้าง
- District
- District location in Prachinburi province
- Coordinates: 13°59′42″N 101°13′17″E
- Country: Thailand
- Province: Prachinburi

Area
  - Total: 361.2 km^{2} (139.5 sq mi)

Population (2005)
  - Total: 30,807
  - Density: 85.3/km^{2} (221/sq mi)
- Time zone: UTC+7 (ICT)
- Postal code: 25150
- Geocode: 2506

Ban Sang (Thai: บ้านสร้าง, pronounced [bâːn sâːŋ]) is the westernmost district (amphoe) of Prachinburi province, central Thailand.

== History ==
In the past, the area of the district was dense forest with many wild elephants. Laotians from Vientiane moved to settle their village in the area, which they named Ban Chang (lit., 'elephant village'). Later the name changed to Ban Sang. Ban Sang district was established in 1905.

== Geography ==
Neighboring districts are (from the northwest clockwise): Ongkharak, Mueang Nakhon Nayok, and Pak Phli of Nakhon Nayok province; Mueang Prachinburi and Si Mahosot of Prachinburi Province; Ratchasan, Bang Khla, Khlong Khuean and Bang Nam Priao of Chachoengsao province.

The important water resource is the Prachinburi River.

== Administration ==
The district is divided into nine sub-districts (tambons), which are further subdivided into 93 villages (mubans). Ban Sang itself is a township (thesaban tambon) which covers parts of tambons Ban Sang and Bang Krabao. There are a further seven tambon administrative organizations (TAO).

No.	Name	Thai name	Villages	Pop.
1.	Ban Sang	บ้านสร้าง	15	5,440
2.	Bang Krabao	บางกระเบา	10	3,326
3.	Bang Toei	บางเตย	10	2,772
4.	Bang Yang	บางยาง	13	3,839
5.	Bang Taen	บางแตน	13	4,296
6.	Bang Phluang	บางพลวง	11	5,800
7.	Bang Pla Ra	บางปลาร้า	8	2,268
8.	Bang Kham	บางขาม	6	1,640
9.	Krathum Phaeo	กระทุ่มแพ้ว	7	1,426
