= Mueang Prachinburi district =

Mueang Prachinburi เมืองปราจีนบุรี
- District
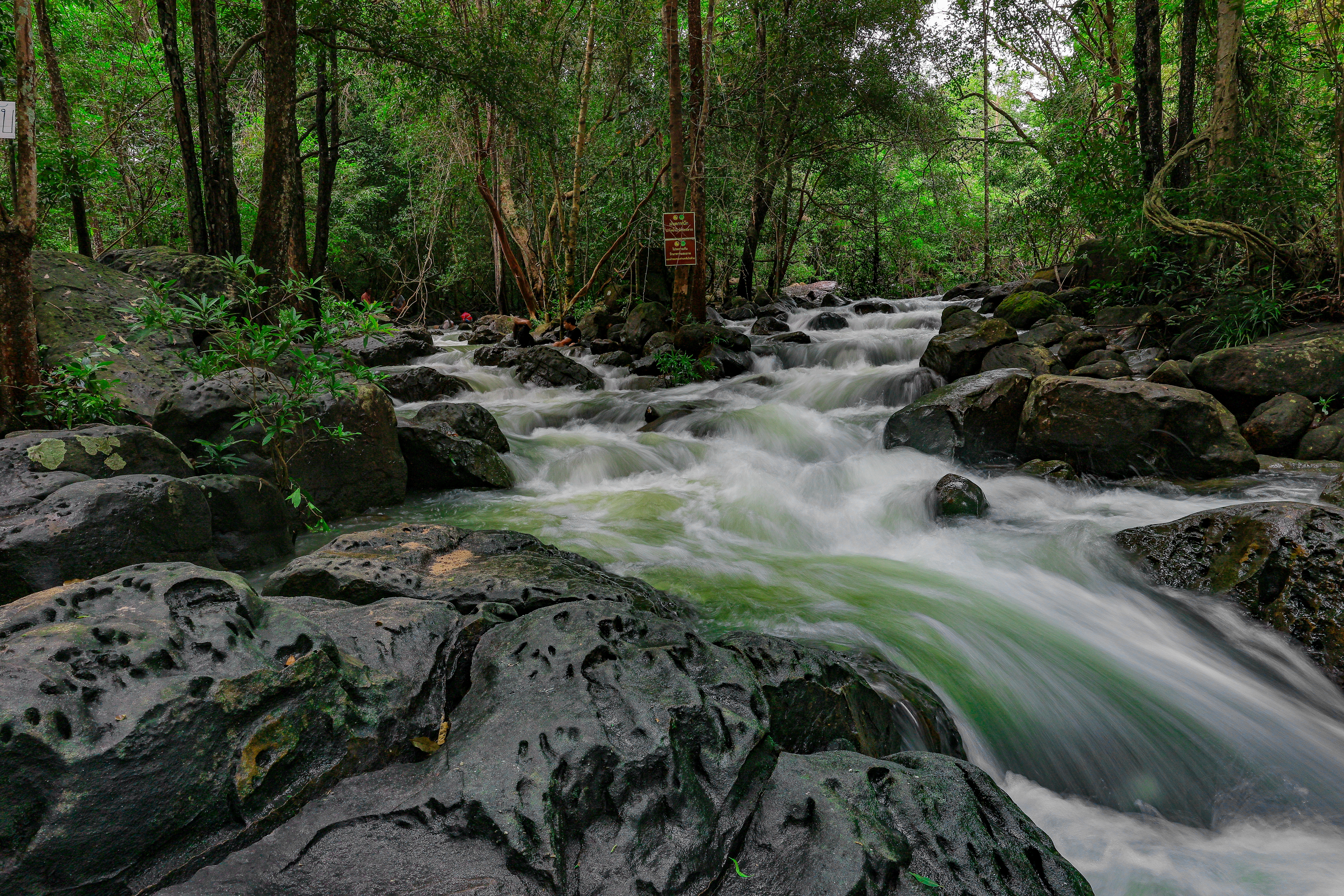
- Wang Bo Waterfall, hidden gem in Mueang Prachinburi

- District location in Prachinburi province
- Coordinates: 14°3′2″N 101°22′0″E
- Country: Thailand
- Province: Prachinburi

Area
  - Total: 451.896 km^{2} (174.478 sq mi)

Population (2005)
  - Total: 106,239
  - Density: 235.1/km^{2} (609/sq mi)
- Time zone: UTC+7 (ICT)
- Postal code: 25000
- Geocode: 2501

Mueang Prachinburi (Thai: เมืองปราจีนบุรี, RTGS: Mueang Prachin Buri, pronounced [mɯ̄a̯ŋ prāː.t͡ɕīːn bū.rīː]) is the capital district (amphoe mueang) of Prachinburi province, eastern Thailand.

As of 2021, the population of Mueang district, Pranchiburi province was 211,900.

== Geography ==
Neighboring districts are (from the east clockwise): Prachantakham, Si Maha Phot, Si Mahosot, and Ban Sang of Prachinburi Province; and Pak Phli of Nakhon Nayok province.

== Administration ==
The district is divided into 13 sub-districts (tambons), which are further subdivided into 144 villages (mubans). Prachinburi is a town (thesaban mueang) which covers tambon Na Mueang. There are two townships (thesaban tambons). Ban Na Prue covers parts of tambon Noen Hom, and Khok Makok covers parts of tambon Non Hom. There are a further 12 tambon administrative organizations (TAO).

No.	Name	Thai name	Villages	Pop.
1.	Na Mueang	หน้าเมือง	-	19,910
2.	Rop Mueang	รอบเมือง	9	6,092
3.	Wat Bot	วัดโบสถ์	11	2,922
4.	Bang Decha	บางเดชะ	9	3,143
5.	Tha Ngam	ท่างาม	12	4,720
6.	Bang Boribun	บางบริบูรณ์	6	1,296
7.	Dong Phraram	ดงพระราม	12	12,703
8.	Ban Phra	บ้านพระ	19	15,396
9.	Khok Mai Lai	โคกไม้ลาย	7	3,977
10.	Mai Khet	ไม้เค็ด	12	11,342
11.	Dong Khilek	ดงขี้เหล็ก	14	9,640
12.	Noen Hom	เนินหอม	20	9,304
13.	Non Hom	โนนห้อม	13	5,794
