= Prachinburi province =

Coordinates: 14°2′52″N 101°22′21″E

Prachinburi ปราจีนบุรี
- Province
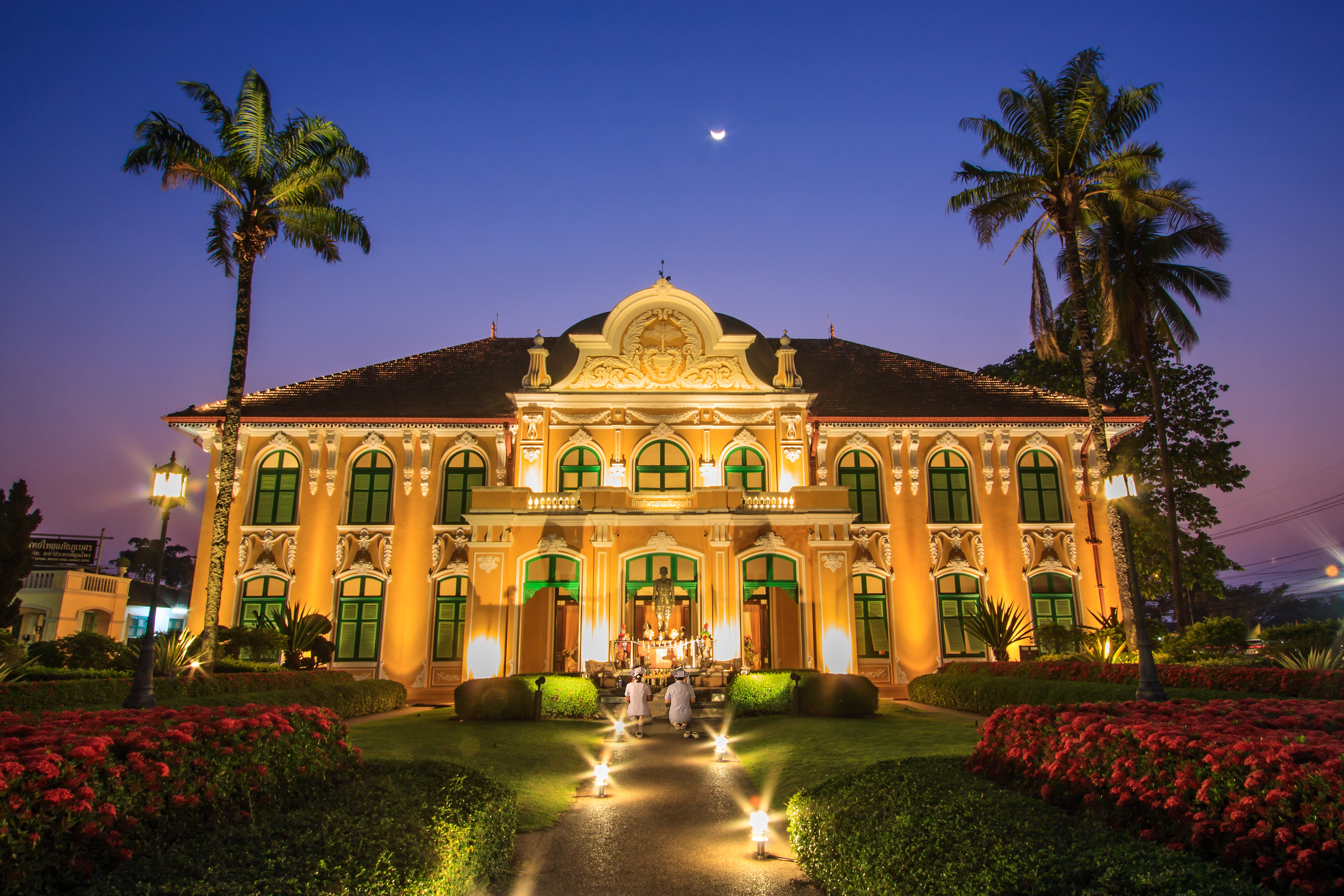
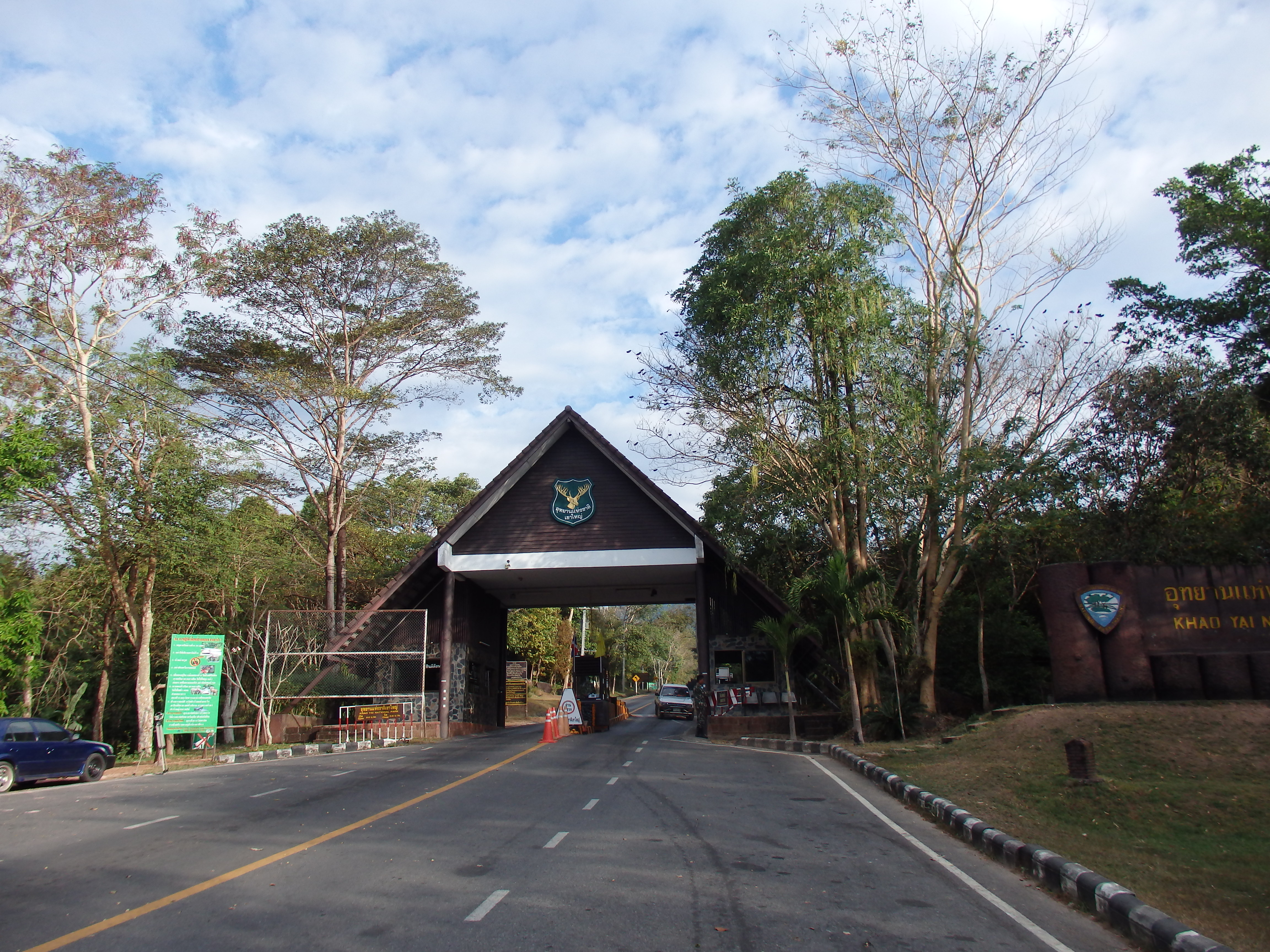
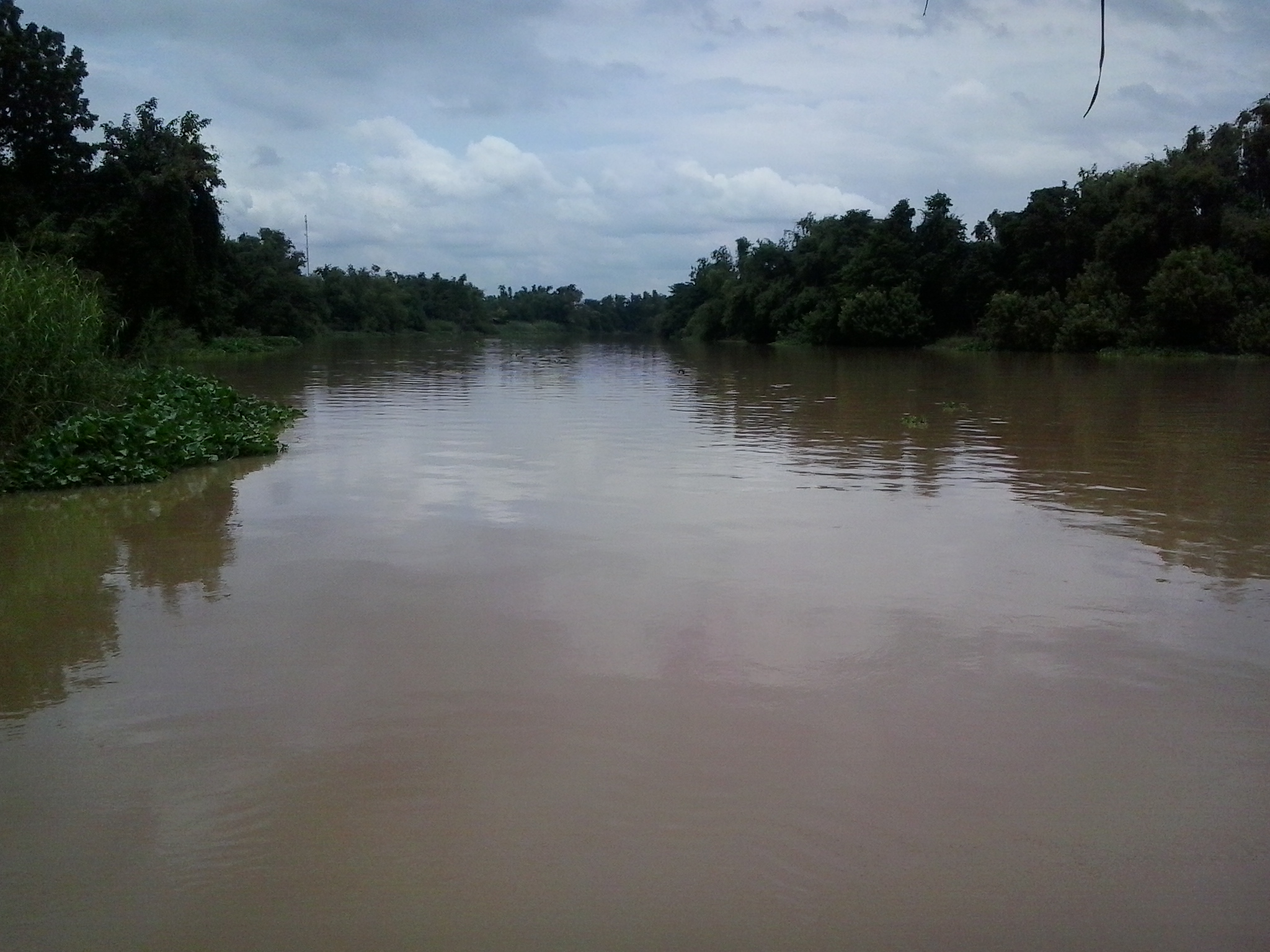
- From top: Thai Traditional Medicine Museum Building, Chaophraya Abhaibhubejhr Hospital, Khao Yai tollbooth in the area of Prachinburi, Bang Pakong River in Prachinburi where it is referred to as Prachinburi River

- Flag Seal
- Nickname: Prachin
- Mottoes: ศรีมหาโพธิ์คู่บ้าน ไผ่ตงหวานคู่เมือง ผลไม้ลือเลื่อง เขตเมืองทวารวดี ("Home of the Great Bodhi Tree. Sweet Tong Bamboo Shoots. Renowned fruit. The Dvaravati city.")
- Map highlighting Prachinburi province
- Country: Thailand
- Capital: Prachinburi

Government
  - Governor: Weerapun Dee-on (since 2024)

Area
  - Total: 5,026 km^{2} (1,941 sq mi)
  - Rank: 45th

Population (2024)
  - Total: ▼500,607
  - Rank: 55th
  - Density: 100/km^{2} (260/sq mi)
  - Rank: 49th

Human Achievement Index
  - HAI (2022): 0.6428 "average" Ranked 37th

GDP
  - Total: baht 297 billion (US$10.3 billion) (2019)
- Time zone: UTC+7 (ICT)
- Postal code: 25xxx
- Calling code: 037
- ISO 3166 code: TH-25
- Website: prachinburi.go.th

Prachinburi Provincial Administrative Organization องค์การบริหารส่วนจังหวัดปราจีนบุรี
- Provincial Administrative Organization
- Interactive map of Prachinburi Provincial Administrative Organization

Government
  - Type: Local administrative divisions
  - Body: Prachinburi Provincial Administrative Organization
  - President: Napaphat Anchasanichamon
- Website: prachinpao.go.th

Prachinburi province (Thai: ปราจีนบุรี, RTGS: Prachin Buri, pronounced [prāː.tɕīːn bū.rīː], lit. 'City of the East') is one of Thailand's seventy-seven provinces (changwat), it lies in eastern Thailand. Neighboring provinces are (from north clockwise) Nakhon Ratchasima, Sa Kaeo, Chachoengsao, and Nakhon Nayok.

The province is divided between the low valley of the Bang Pakong River and the higher ground of the Sankamphaeng Range, and more than a quarter of it is forest. It holds the ancient town of Si Mahosot in Si Mahosot district, where a Dvaravati settlement was later overlaid by Khmer building, including an arogyasala of the reign of Jayavarman VII.

Prachinburi is now a manufacturing province, with most of its workforce outside agriculture. Its provincial seal shows the Bodhi tree, for a tree said to have been planted at Wat Si Maha Phot some two thousand years ago.

== History ==
Located in Si Mahosot district, their existed an ancient Buddhist site at the Sra Morakot Archeological Site. Chinese wares of the Northern Song have been recorded at the site, which Natthapong Matsong conjectures reached Dvaravati towns as goods of an elite. The site contains an Arogyasala dating to the reign of Jayavarman VII of the Khmer Empire in the late 1100s, although the Arogyasala was possibly constructed on an older Dvaravati shrine. Not much of the Arogyasala survives, but it most likely was designed in the standard layout. In the temple of Wat Morakot at the site contains the largest and oldest carvings of The Buddha's footprints in Thailand. Created between the 600s and 800s, the footprints were made from natural laterite and hold significance to Buddhists. The site also contains two ancient reserviors, with Sra Boa being one of them.

The ancient town of Si Mahosot, also called Dong Si Maha Phot, lies in the same district and stands at the centre of a long-running argument about religion in the Chao Phraya valley. Srisakra Vallibhotama divided the valley into a Buddhist western half and a Hindu eastern half centred on this town. Nicolas Revire rejects the division, and points to the textual, epigraphic and material evidence for Buddhists in the Si Mahosot region in the seventh and eighth centuries. Robert Brown treats the same ground as an eastern interface area between Preangkorian and Dvaravati art. A head from a Harihara sculpture, reported to have been found in Chanthaburi province, is held in the Prachin Buri National Museum. Imported wares have been reported from the ancient town, sherds of Tang ceramics and of Persian Gulf turquoise-glazed earthenware. A fragment of a Tang coin was recovered from monument 86 at the site. Patcharaporn Ngernkerd and colleagues make Si Mahosot one of four central towns in their survey of fifteen moated sites in eastern Thailand, measuring 1.06 km² within its moat. It carries the highest density of ancient remains in the region. They place it on a former shoreline of the Gulf of Thailand, occupied since at least the sixth century, and report Chinese and Persian ceramics of the eighth and ninth centuries from it. Gold and glass beads, gold-glass and semi-precious stone beads, kendi vessels and Roman eye beads are also reported from the town. A Buddha's footprint and a seated Buddha in a style associated with Funan are recorded there as well, and Ngernkerd and colleagues treat them as evidence that the town was already established during the sixth century. A further inscription from the province, K. 997 of 1061, is Buddhist and written in Old Khmer and Pali, and comes from Prasat Sra Morakot.

== Geography ==
The province is divided into two major parts, the low river valley of the Bang Pakong River, and the higher lands with plateaus and mountains of the Sankamphaeng Range, the southern prolongation of the Dong Phaya Yen Mountains. The total forest area is 1,436 km^{2} (554 sq mi) or 28.6 percent of provincial area.

=== National parks ===
There are two national parks, along with two other national parks, make up region 1 (Prachinburi) of Thailand's protected areas. (Visitors in fiscal year 2024)

Thap Lan National Park	2,236 km^{2} (863 sq mi)	(96,852)
Khao Yai National Park	2,166 km^{2} (836 sq mi)	(1,887,335)

== Symbols ==
The provincial seal shows the Bodhi tree. It symbolizes the first Bodhi tree planted about 2,000 years ago at Wat Si Maha Phot. The provincial colors are red and yellow. Red symbolises the land and yellow, Buddhism.

The provincial tree is the Bodhi tree (Ficus religiosa). The provincial flower is the cork tree (Millingtonia hortensis). The cyprinid fish Cyclocheilichthys enoplos is the provincial fish.

== Administrative divisions ==
=== Provincial government ===
The province is divided into seven districts (amphoes), which are further divided into 65 subdistricts (tambons) and 658 villages (mubans).

1. Mueang Prachinburi
2. Kabin Buri
3. Na Di
4. Part of Sa Kaeo province
5. Part of Sa Kaeo province
6. Ban Sang
7. Prachantakham
8. Si Maha {Phot
9. Si Mahosot
10. Part of Sa Kaeo province
11. Part of Sa Kaeo province
12. Part of Sa Kaeo province

Map of seven districts

=== Local government ===
As of 26 November 2019 there are: one Prachinburi Provincial Administration Organisation (ongkan borihan suan changwat) and 13 municipal (thesaban) areas in the province. Prachinburi has town (thesaban mueang) status. Further 12 subdistrict municipalities (thesaban tambon). The non-municipal areas are administered by 56 Subdistrict Administrative Organisations - SAO (ongkan borihan suan tambon).

== Transport ==
=== Roads ===
The main road through Prachinburi is Route 319. While Route 319 does not lead directly to other major centers, along with Route 33 it leads to Nakhon Nayok, and along with Routes 314 and 304 it leads to Bangkok.

=== Rail ===
Prachinburi is served by the State Railway of Thailand's Eastern Line. Prachin Buri Railway Station, is the main railway station located 122 kilometres (76 mi) from Bangkok. Five trains trains per day in either direction stop at this station.

== Economy ==
=== Economic output ===
In 2022, Prachinburi province had an economic output of 291.747 billion baht (US$7.678 billion). This amounts to per capita gross provincial product (GPP) of 445,100 baht (US$11,700). In 2024 the total labourforce was 392,051 of which 387,920 persons were employed in economic activity. In agriculture and forestry 60,166 persons (15.5%) were employed and in the non-agricultural sector 327,754 persons (84.5%).

Gross Provincial Product (GPP)
	Activities	Baht	Percent
1	Manufacturing	207,356,000,000	71.1
2	Trade	34,359,000,000	11.8
3	Agriculture + forestry	10,713,000,000	3.7
4	Energy	7,894,000,000	2.7
5	Defence + publ.admin.	7,855,000,000	2.7
6	Education	4,754,000,000	1.6
7	Finance	4,229,000,000	1.4
8	Real estate	4,223,000,000	1.4
9	Transportation	2,542,000,000	0.9
10	Construction	2,391,000,000	0.8
11	Human health	1,697,000,000	0.6
12	Water supply	705,000,000	0.2
13	Information	686,000,000	0.2
14	Hotel and restaurant	556,000,000	0.2
15	Administration	528,000,000	0.2
16	Other service activity	443,000,000	0.2
17	Scientific activity	312,000,000	0.1
18	Mining	276,000,000	0.1
19	Pastime	228,000,000	0.1
	Total	291,747,000,000	100

Employed persons
	Activities	Workforce	Percent
1	Manufacturing	160,859	41.5
2	Agriculture and forestry	60,166	15.5
3	Trade	51,375	13.2
4	Hotel and restaurant	25,075	6.5
5	Construction	20,266	5.2
6	Defence and publ.admin.	13,842	3.6
7	Transportation	10,225	2.6
8	Education	9,115	2.3
9	Other service activity	8,631	2.2
10	Administration	8,541	2.2
11	Human Health	7,529	1.9
12	Finance	3,210	0.8
13	Energy	2,640	0.7
14	Scientific activity	1,867	0.5
15	Pastime	1,643	0.4
16	Real estate	1,591	0.4
17	Information	609	0.2
18	Household enterprise	519	0.2
19	Water supply	217	0.1
	Total	387,920	100

Tambon Hua Wa in Si Maha Phot District is the site of Rojana Industrial Park. Among other tenants of the park, Honda Automobile (Thailand) has established a 17.2 billion baht plant there to manufacture sub-compact vehicles. The plant, opened in March 2016, had an initial production capacity of 60,000 vehicles per year. Honda produces hybrid electric vehicles and batteries for electric vehicles, at its factories in Prachinburi and Ayutthaya. Honda's Prachinburi factory has an annual capacity of 120,000 units.

== Health ==
The main hospital of Prachinburi province is Chaophraya Abhaibhubejhr Hospital.

== Human achievement index 2022 ==
Health	Education	Employment	Income
16	19	20	37
Housing	Family	Transport	Participation
54	69	62	39
Province Prachinburi, with an HAI 2022 value of 0.6428 is "average", occupies place 37 in the ranking.

Since 2003, United Nations Development Programme (UNDP) in Thailand has tracked progress on human development at sub-national level using the Human achievement index (HAI), a composite index covering all the eight key areas of human development. National Economic and Social Development Board (NESDB) has taken over this task since 2017.

Rank	Classification
1 - 13	"high"
14 - 29	"somewhat high"
30 - 45	"average"
46 - 61	"somewhat low"
62 - 77	"low"

Map with provinces and HAI 2022 rankings
