= Nakhon Nayok (disambiguation) =

Nakhon Nayok is a town in Thailand.

Nakhon Nayok may also refer to:

- Nakhon Nayok Province, a central province of Thailand
  - Amphoe Mueang Nakhon Nayok, the capital district of Nakhon Nayok Province
- Nakhon Nayok River, a river of Thailand
