= Bang Mot =

Bang Mot or Bang Mod may refer to:

- Bang Mot, Chom Thong, a subdistrict of Bangkok
- Bang Mot, Thung Khru, a subdistrict of Bangkok, adjacent to the above
- Khlong Bang Mot, a canal in Bangkok
- Bang Mot tangerine, a tangerine cultivar grown in the area
- King Mongkut's University of Technology Thonburi, commonly nicknamed Bangmod after the location of its main campus
- 72nd Anniversary Stadium (Bang Mod), also in the area
