= Nang Rong Waterfall =

Waterfall in Thailand

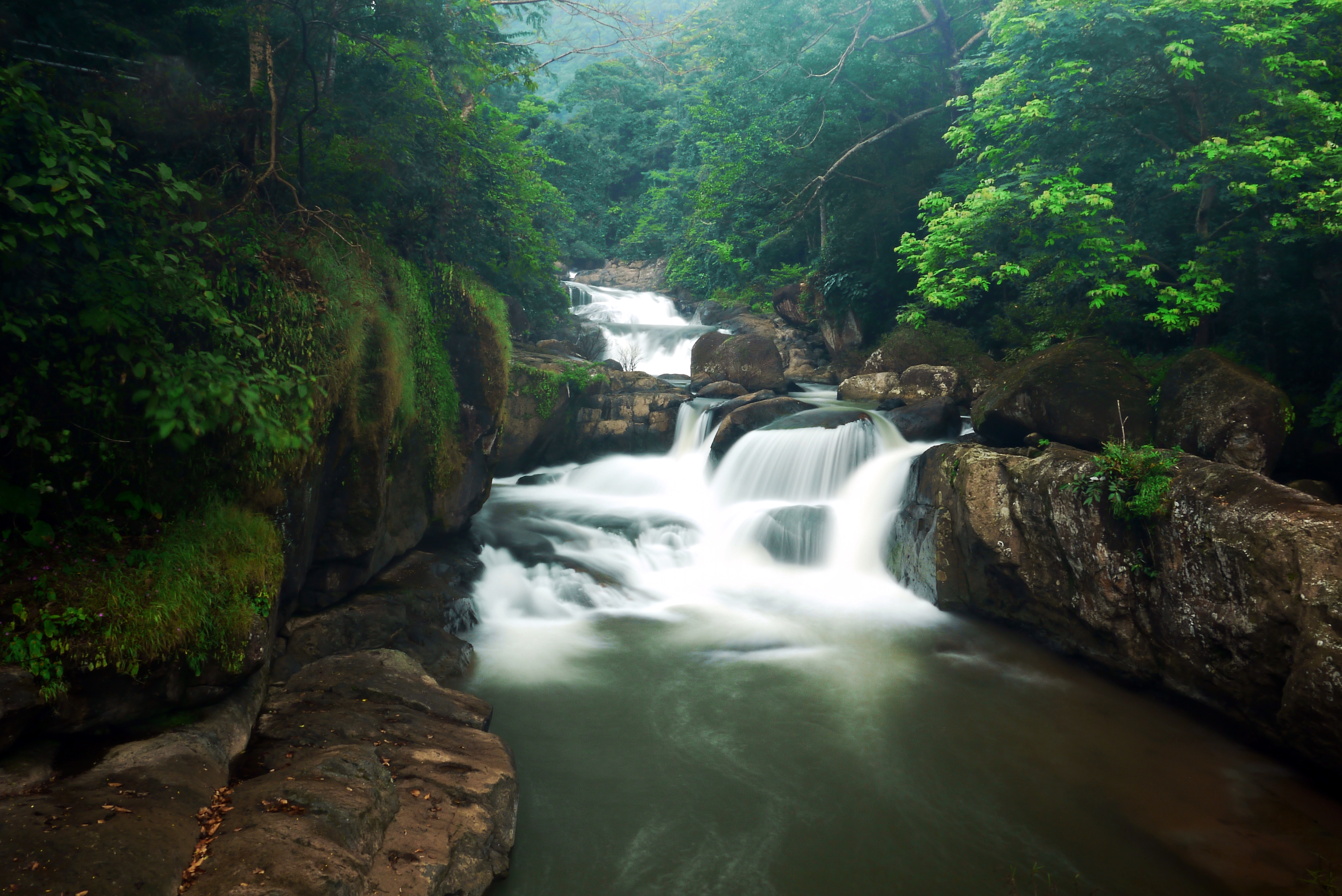
- The waterfall in October 2014
- Interactive map of Nang Rong Waterfall
- Location: Hin Tang, Mueang Nakhon Nayok, Nakhon Nayok, Thailand
- Coordinates: 14°20′00″N 101°19′15″E
- Watercourse: Nakhon Nayok River

The Nang Rong Waterfall (Thai: น้ำตกนางรอง, RTGS: Nam Tok Nang Rong, pronounced [náːm.tɔ̀ːk nâːŋ.rɔːŋ]) is a waterfall, located in the Tambon of Hin Tang, Mueang Nakhon Nayok district, Nakhon Nayok province, Central Thailand. It is part of the greater Khao Yai National Park.

== Overview ==
The waterfall is surrounded by the forests of the national park. It is located above a set of rock formations, making multi-tier pools of water visitors are allowed to immerse in.

There is an admission fee to go to the waterfall, but is otherwise relatively easy to access. A road leading to the location connects to the nearby Route No. 3049 of National Highway 33 some 20 km (12 mi) away. Guesthouses and other amenities are also located nearby.
