= Dong Lakhon ancient city =

Archaeological site in Thailand

Dong Lakhon
- เมืองโบราณดงละคร (Thai)
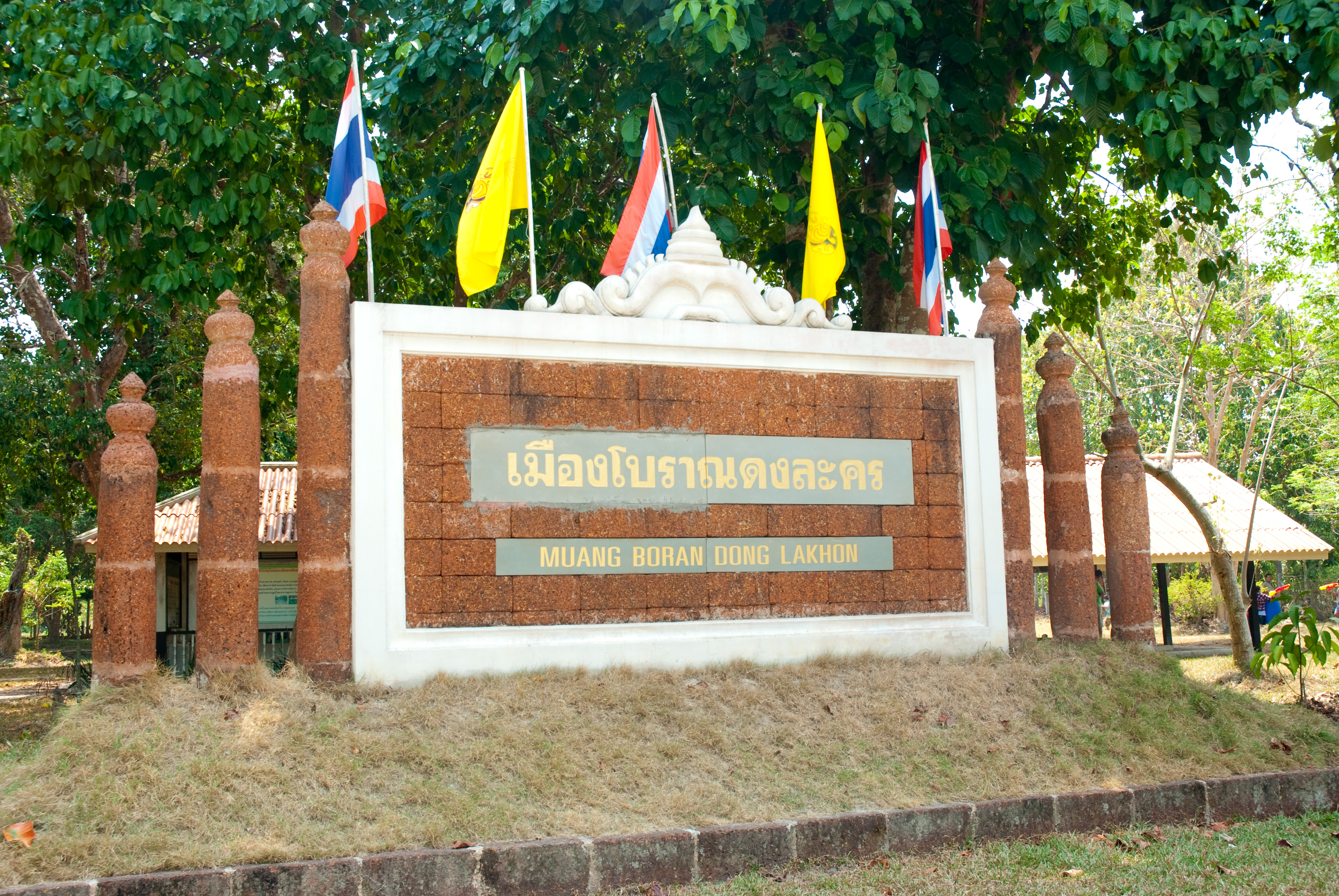
- Entrance to Dong Lakhon
- Interactive map of Dong Lakhon
- 14°09′35.7″N 101°10′01.2″E
- Type: Human settlement
- Periods: Ancient history
- Cultures: Dvaravati
- Associated with: Mon people
- Location: Mueang Nakhon Nayok, Nakhon Nayok, Thailand

History
- Built: c. 800s AD
- Abandoned: c. 1300s AD

Site notes
- Area: 6 square kilometres (600 ha)
- Architectural styles: Dvaravati; Khmer
- Condition: Partial restoration
- Owner: Public
- Management: Fine Arts Department, no entry fee
- Public access: Yes

Muang Boran Dong Lakhon (Thai: เมืองโบราณดงละคร), also called Dong Yai, Laplae City or just Dong Lakhon, is an archaeological site in Thailand's Nakhon Nayok province. The site dates back to the 6th or 7th century and was inhabited during the periods of Dvaravati, the Khmer Empire and pre-Ayutthaya Thai culture. By the 1300s, the site was abandoned, with its inhabitants settling elsewhere in modern-day Nakhon Nayok province. The site was registered by the Fine Arts Department as a National Ancient Site on 8 March 1985.

== Layout and location ==
Dong Lakhon sits on a low plateau within Mueang Nakhon Nayok district in Nakhon Nayok province, Thailand. It is 9 kilometres (5.6 mi) from downtown Nakhon Nayok, and not far south of the Nakhon Nayok river. The site is 6 square kilometres (600 ha) in area.

The site's core is an oval shaped area called Dong Lek, which most likely served as the residential area for the city's rulers whilst the town folk lived around it. Dong Lek has a 1.8 kilometres (1.1 mi) perimeter, and is surrounded by an inner and outer set of ramparts and a moat. The much smaller outer rampart is at most only 1–2 metres (3.3–6.6 ft) tall, while having been completely eroded away in other parts. In contrast, the inner rampart is much taller and more intact, being 5–6 metres (16–20 ft) tall. Both the moat and ramparts gave Dong Lek around 60 metres (200 ft) wide defences. These defences are typical of Dvaravati cities. There exists four gates (north, east, south, and west) providing access to Dong Lek, with the eastern side being the main entrance and was called Nong Krapor. These gates are accompanied by ponds, which are assumed to have been either dug or expanded when the site came under Khmer influence. The pond by the north gate also served as a small laterite quarry. Both these ponds and moat still hold water during the wet season.

Around 250 metres (820 ft) north of Dong Lek are the remains of Dvaravati era structures. Historical site #1, locally called the 'House of Three Stones' (Thai: บ้านหินสามก้อน, romanized: Ban Hin Sam Korn), is a 75 square metres (810 sq ft) brick foundation of what would've been a Buddhist temple or shrine. Historical site #2 is the remains of a stupa. Only the laterite base and a two-layered hollow round stone carving remain. Nearby are the remains of smaller stupas.

== History ==
=== Etymology ===
The name origin of the name Dong Lakhon comes from two main theories. One states that it originates from Dong Nakhon, with Dong (ดง) meaning 'forest' and Nakhon (นคร) meaning city. Thus Dong Nakhon means 'city among the forest' in Thai. The other theory is comes from local culture which states that the name is originated from when villagers who heard Mahori music from the city as if a lakorn (ละคร; "play") was being performed.

=== Khmer-era ===
As evidenced from discovered pottery and artifacts found at the site, Khmer culture became very influential around the mid-10th century when it was absorbed into the Khmer Empire. Although no remains of any buildings built by the Khmer have been discovered at the site, numerous Khmer artifacts such as bronze bells, gold leaves, and images of the Buddha designed in Baphuon and Bayon styles have been uncovered.

=== Excavation ===
Major excavations on the site was conducted between 1972 and 2013.

On 8 March 1985, the Fine Arts Department of the Ministry of Culture registered Dong Lakhon as a National Ancient Site.

== Gallery ==
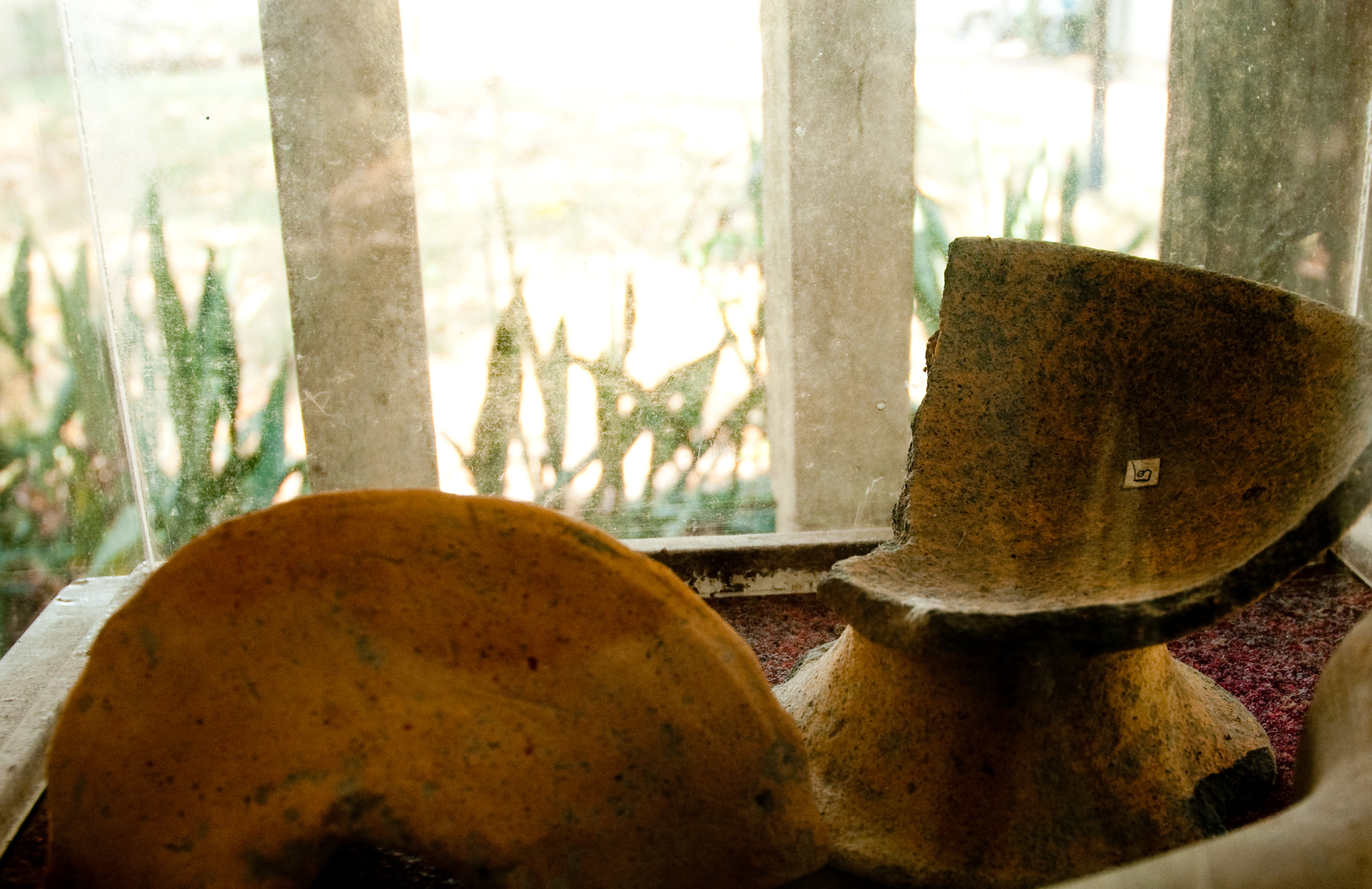
Pottery excavated from Dong Lakhon

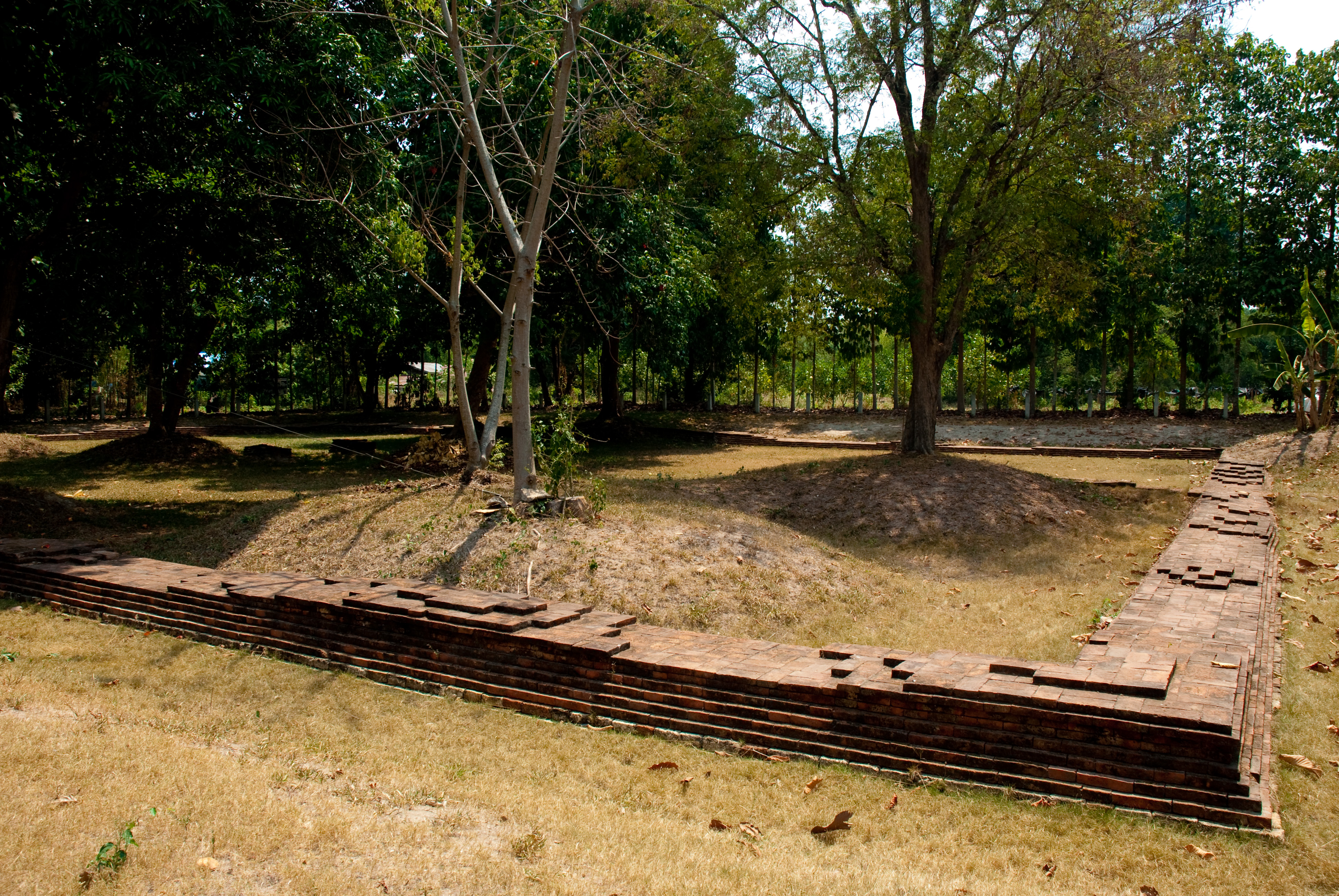
Historical site #1: the remains of a temple

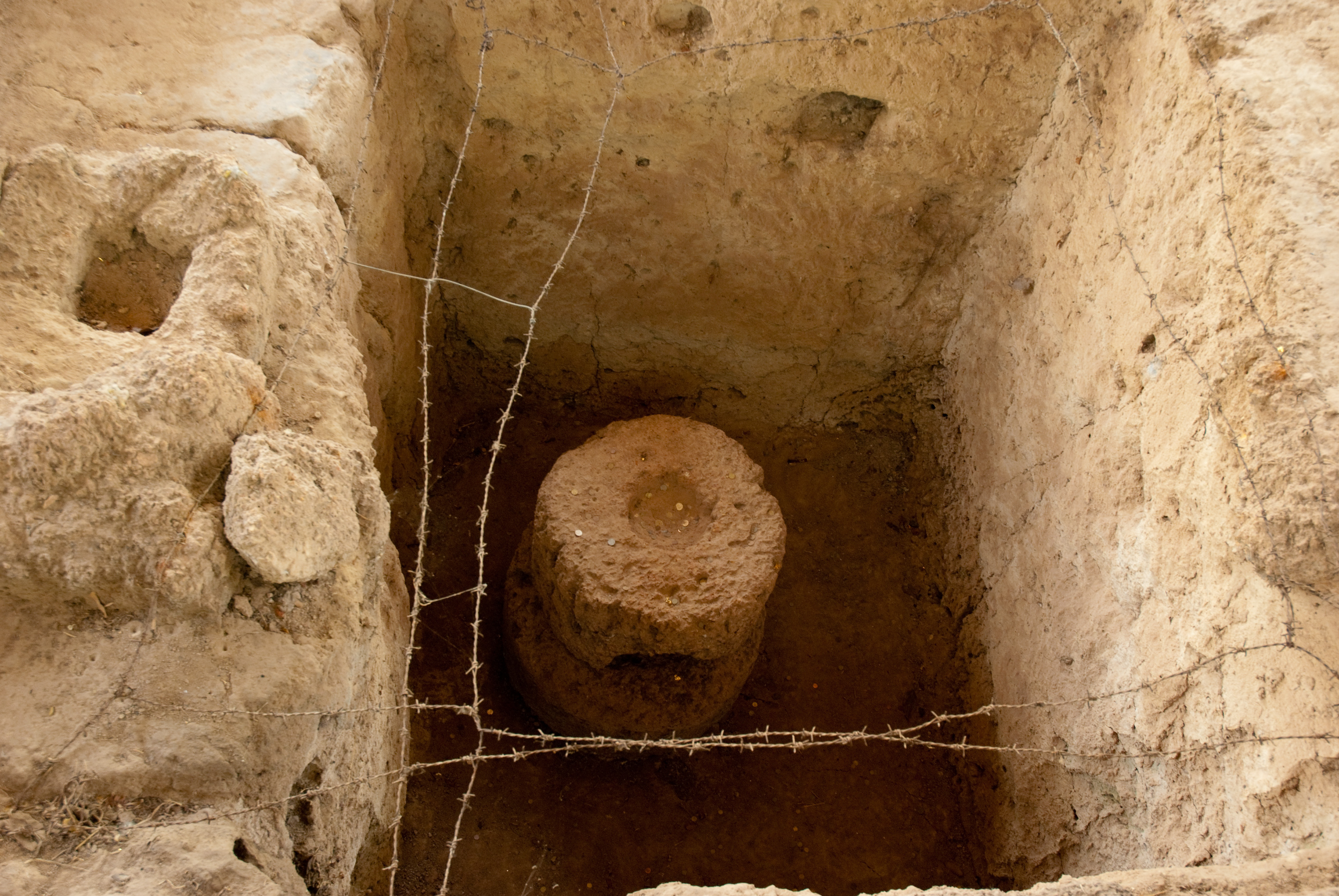
Historical site #2: remains of a stupa

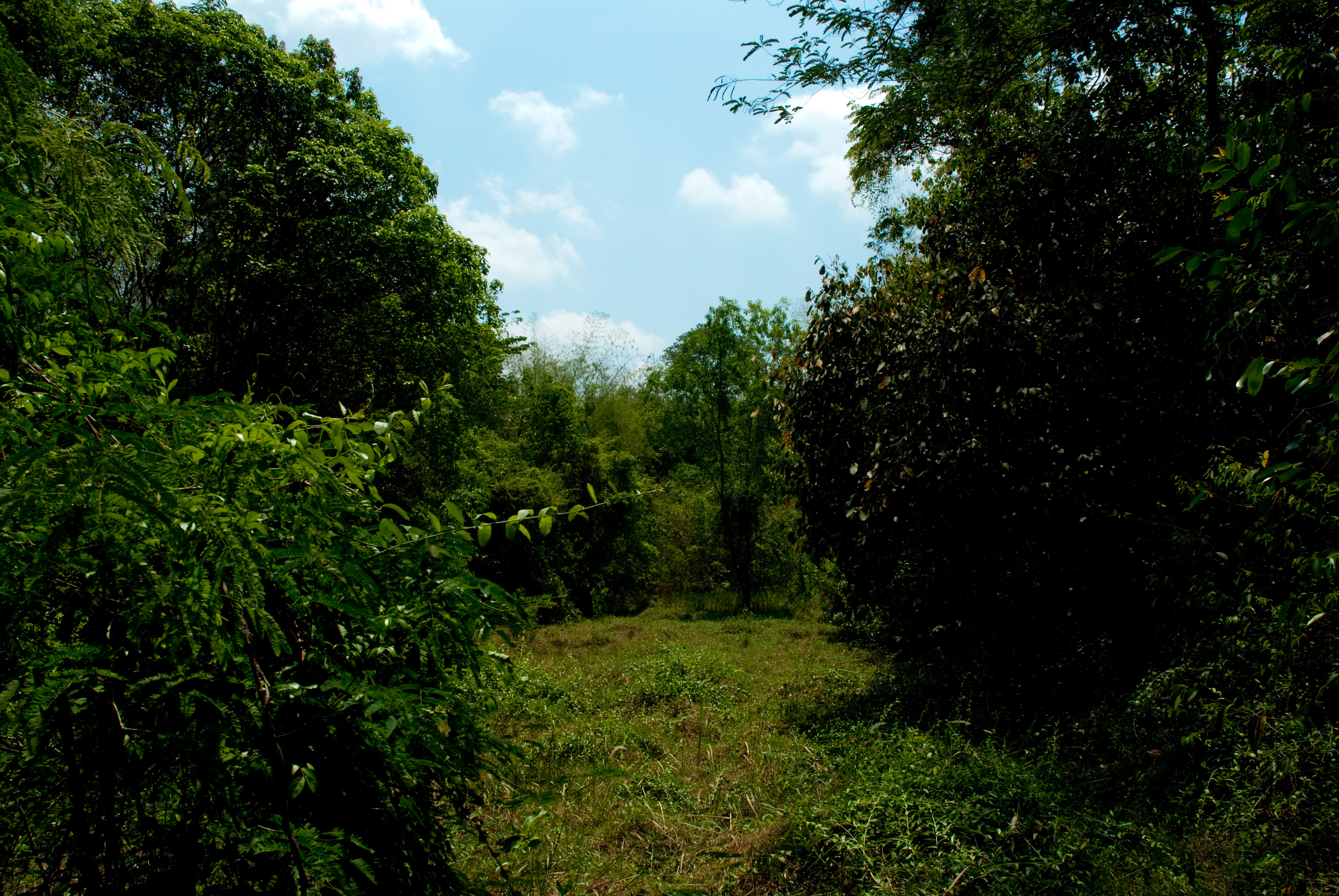
Remains of the moat surrounding Dong Lek
