= Rangsit Canal =

Canal in Chao Phraya Valley, Thailand

Coordinates: 14°01′08.93″N 100°43′59.57″E

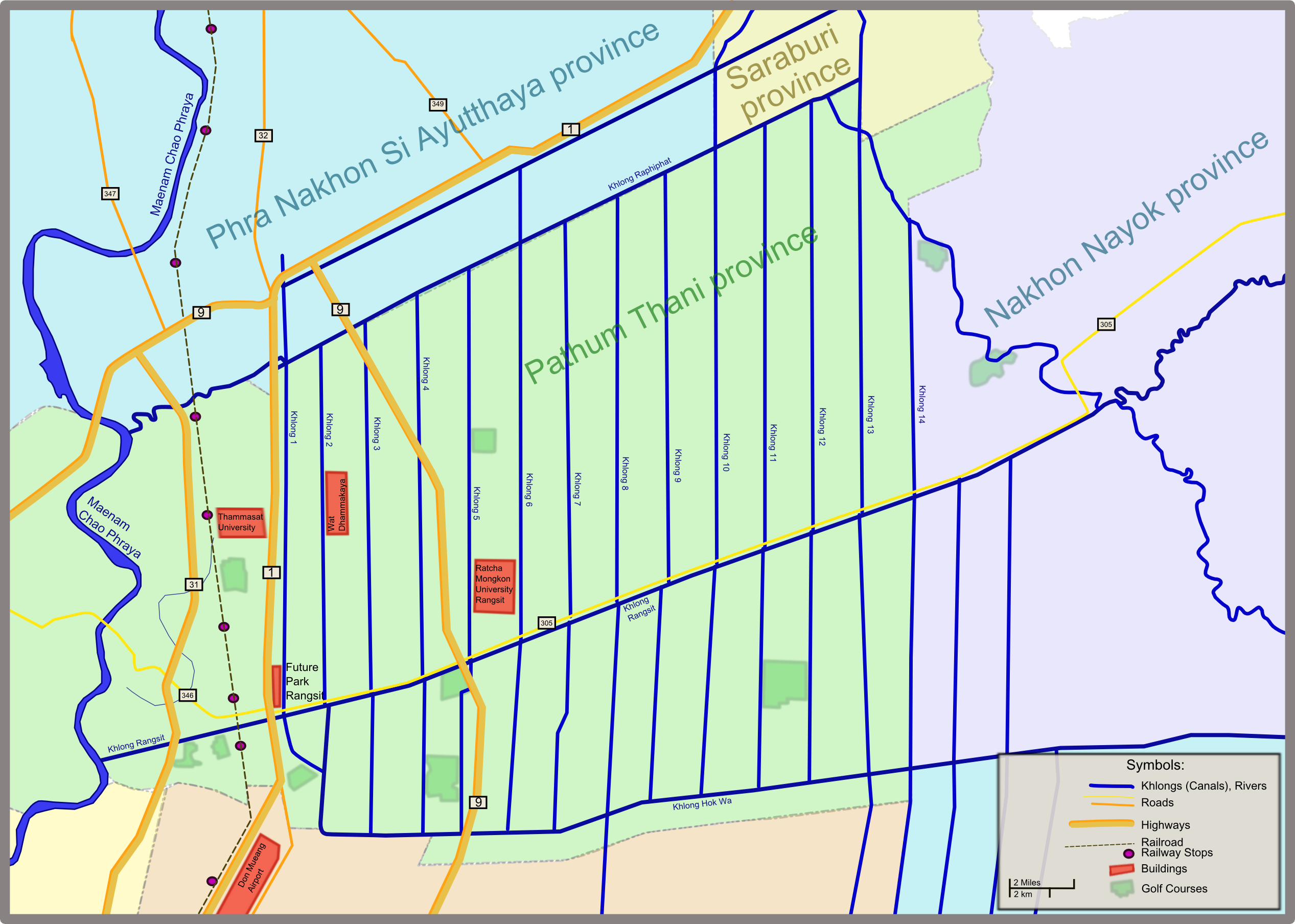
Map of the Rangsit Canal irrigation system

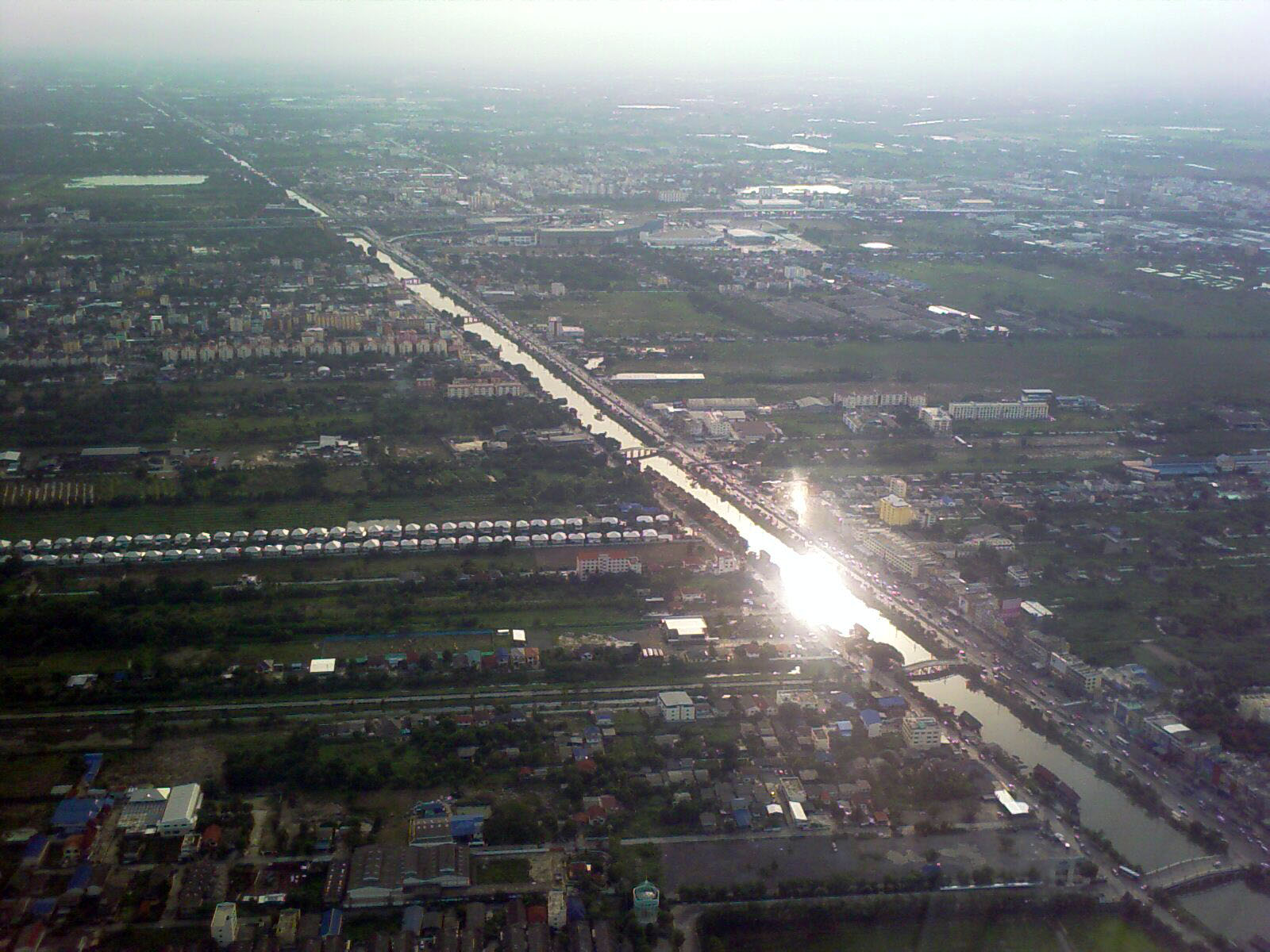
Rangsit Canal

The Rangsit Canal (Thai: คลองรังสิต; RTGS: khlong rangsit), is a canal in the eastern part of the Chao Phraya valley, central Thailand. The name of the canal was given by King Chulalongkorn (Rama V) in honour of his son, Rangsit, Prince of Chai Nat.

== History and characteristics ==
Rangsit Canal was the first irrigation project in Siam (Thailand). King Chulalongkorn ordered its construction in 1890 and assigned Prince Sai Sanitvongse (maternal grandfather of Prince Rangsit) as the project president.

The canal starts at the east bank of the Chao Phraya River in Tambon Ban Mai, Mueang Pathum Thani District, Pathum Thani Province. It then runs eastward passing by Thung Luang and empties into the Nakhon Nayok River in Ongkharak District, Nakhon Nayok Province.

In the past, the area around Rangsit Canal from Pathum Thani to Nakhon Nayok Provinces was the largest tangerine growing area in Thailand with no fewer than 150,000 rai (about 59,288 acres), producing 80% of the country's output. The Rangsit tangerine was once famous, just as the Bang Mot tangerine (ส้มบางมด) in Bangkok's Thonburi district is today. Though its orchards have nearly vanished, efforts are underway to revive them.

== Rangsit Canal boat service ==
The Rangsit Canal passenger boat service is a planned water bus service that would operate on the Rangsit Canal. The service was originally planned to begin in 2014. However, while construction of piers had been completed in June 2015, by 2019 the service had not begun operations.
