= Motorway 6 (Thailand) =

Motorway in Thailand

Motorway Route 6
- ทางหลวงพิเศษหมายเลข 6
- Bang Pa-In - Nakhon Ratchasima Motorway ถนนสายบางปะอิน-นครราชสีมา
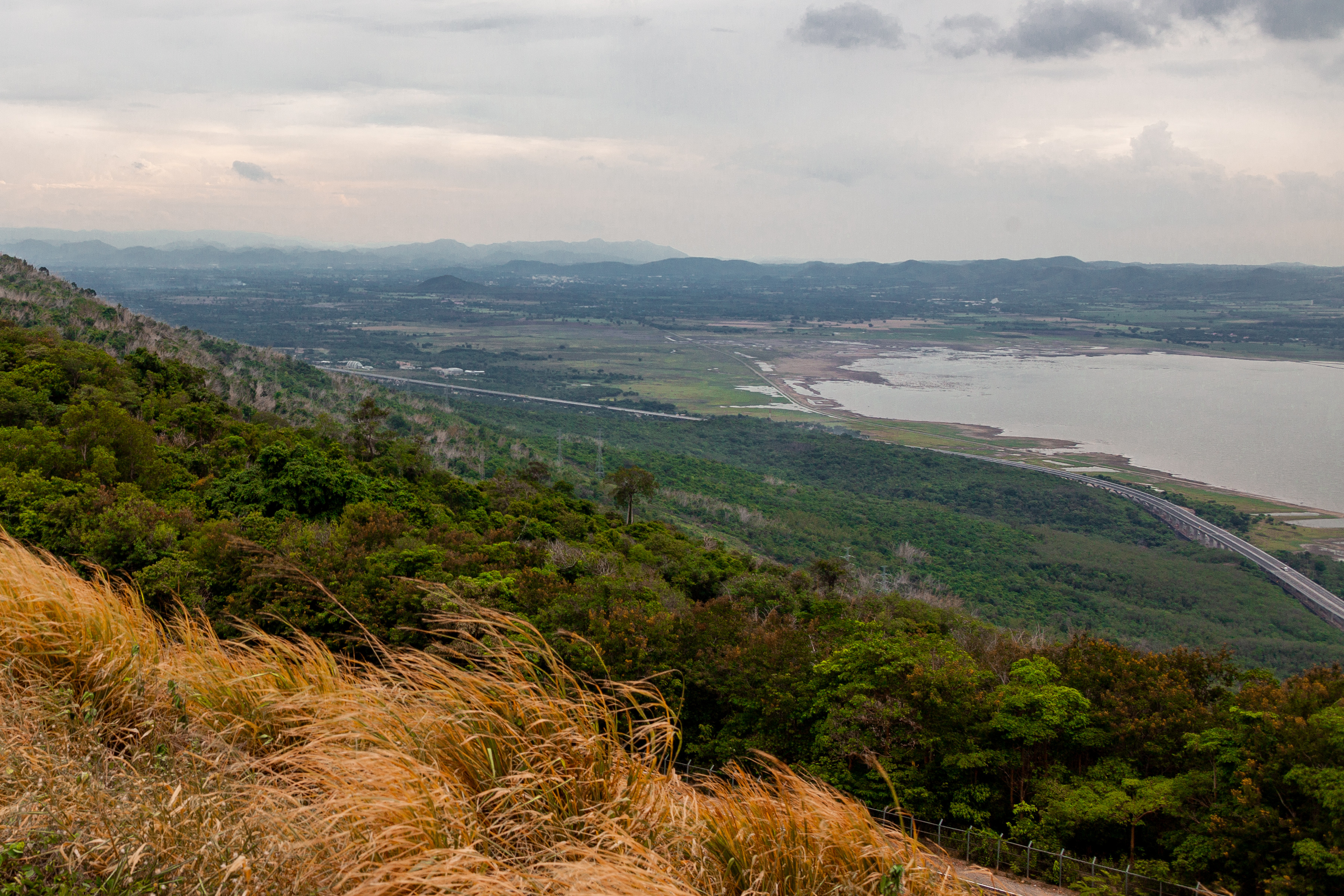

Route information
- Length: 196 km (122 mi)
- Time period: 2016 - present

Major junctions
- Southwest end: AH2 Wang Noi District, Bang Pang In District, Phra Nakhon Si Ayutthaya
- Wang Noi District, Phra Nakhon Si Ayutthaya; AH1 Nong Khae District, Saraburi Province; AH12 AH2 Saraburi District, Saraburi; Kaeng Khoi District, Saraburi; AH12 Muak Lek District,Saraburi; Pak Chong District, Nakhon Ratchasima; Sikhio district, Nakhon Ratchasima; Kham Thale So district, Nakhon Ratchasima
- Northeast end: Nakhon Ratchasima, Nakhon Ratchasima Province

Location
- Country: Thailand

Highway system
- Highways in Thailand; Motorways; Asian Highways

Motorway 6 or the Bang Pa-in–Nakhon Ratchasima Motorway is an under-construction controlled-access highway, part of the Thai motorway network. It will serve as the arterial link from the capital city of Bangkok to the city of Nakhon Ratchasima, which serves as the gateway to the entire northeastern region.

== History ==
The project was conceived in 1997 as part of the national highway network master plan (and one of three segments serving the northeast region), but construction only began in 2016.

It was originally scheduled for completion in 2020, and construction was reported to be 96 percent complete by then, but the project faced delays due to outdated information from surveys conducted since 2008, necessitating modifications to the designs and extensions of the budget. By 2022, it was expected to open in 2025, though full opening has since been pushed back to at least 2026. The section between Pak Chong and Nakhon Ratchasima was opened for persistent trial use in June 2024, following earlier special trial openings during the New Year's and Songkran festivals.

== Routes ==
Motorway 6 comprises 3 route construction projects, namely:

1.Bang Pa-In - Nakhon Ratchasima, 196 kilometres (122 mi), (Under construction, opened in some parts in 2024)

2. Nakhon Ratchasima - Khon Kaen, 169 kilometres (105 mi) (Under study)

3.Khon Kaen - Nong Khai, 160 kilometres (99 mi)

=== Bang Pa-In - Nakhon Ratchasima ===
The motorway begins with links from Kanchanaphisek Road (Motorway 9) and Phahonyothin Road (Highway 1), near the Bang Pa-in Interchange in Phra Nakhon Si Ayutthaya Province north of Bangkok, and leads northeast through Saraburi Province, passing through the Dong Phaya Yen pass before entering the Khorat Plateau and terminating at Nakhon Ratchasima Bypass Road (Highway 204). It runs a distance of 196 kilometres (122 mi), with elevated sections as it passes through the mountains, including one where it is elevated over Mittraphap Road as it runs along the edge of the Lam Takhong Reservoir.

== Future Plannings ==
=== Nakhon Ratchasima - Khon Kaen ===
The Department of Highways (DOH), through its Bureau of Planning, has engaged a consortium of consultants to conduct a feasibility study covering economic, engineering, and environmental impact aspects for this route. The study is expected to be completed by 2019, after which the project will be submitted to the Cabinet for construction approval, a step anticipated to take place in 2024. The proposed route passes through the provinces of Nakhon Ratchasima, Maha Sarakham, and Khon Kaen.

=== Khon Kaen - Nong Khai ===
Currently, the Department of Highways—through its Bureau of Planning—has no plans to initiate a feasibility study (covering economic, engineering, and environmental aspects) for the Khon Kaen–Nong Khai route. It is anticipated that the study will commence only after the Nakhon Ratchasima–Khon Kaen route project receives Cabinet approval.
