= Rangsit (disambiguation) =

Rangsit is a name of Prince of Thailand

Rangsit may also refer to:

- Rangsit, a city in Pathum Thani Province, Thailand.
- Khlong Rangsit, a canal north of Bangkok
- Rangsit University, a university in Pathum Thani Province, Thailand
