= Wihan Daeng district =

Wihan Daeng วิหารแดง
- District
- District location in Saraburi province
- Coordinates: 14°20′47″N 100°59′22″E
- Country: Thailand
- Province: Saraburi

Area
  - Total: 204.5 km^{2} (79.0 sq mi)

Population (2000)
  - Total: 33,883
  - Density: 165.7/km^{2} (429.1/sq mi)
- Time zone: UTC+7 (ICT)
- Postal code: 18150
- Geocode: 1904

Wihan Daeng (Thai: วิหารแดง, pronounced [wí.hǎːn dɛ̄ːŋ]) is a district (amphoe) in southern part of Saraburi province, central Thailand.

== History ==
Tambon Nong Mu of Nong Khae district was separated to create the minor district (king amphoe) Nong Mu in 1937. The district office was moved to Ban Lam in 1957. The minor district was upgraded to a full district and renamed to Wihan Daeng on 12 April 1961.

== Etymology ==
The word Wihan Daeng comes from the Buddhist Red Wihara of Lawa people in Ban Lam area, which was built by red bricks. The Red Wihara does not exist anymore.

== Geography ==
Neighboring districts are (from the west clockwise) Nong Khae, Mueang Saraburi, Kaeng Khoi of Saraburi Province, Ban Na of Nakhon Nayok province, and Nong Suea of Pathum Thani province.

== Administration ==
The district is divided into six sub-districts (tambons).

No.	Name	Thai
1.	Nong Mu	หนองหมู
2.	Ban Lam	บ้านลำ
3.	Khlong Ruea	คลองเรือ
4.	Wihan Daeng	วิหารแดง
5.	Nong Suang	หนองสรวง
6.	Charoen Tham	เจริญธรรม
