= Nong Suea district =

Nong Suea หนองเสือ
- District
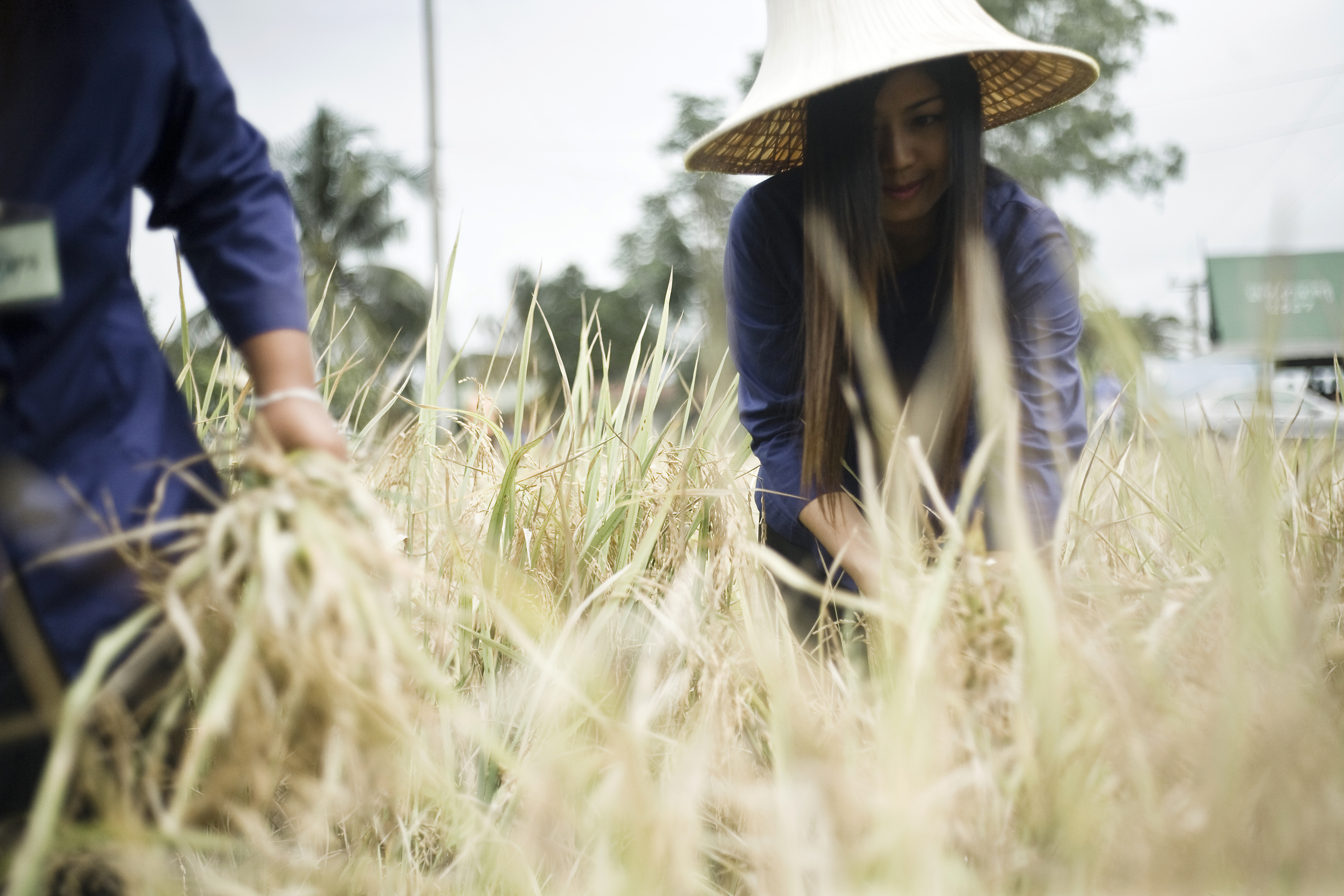
- Farmers harvest rice at Nong Suea

- District location in Pathum Thani province
- Coordinates: 14°8′6″N 100°49′27″E
- Country: Thailand
- Province: Pathum Thani
- Seat: Bueng Ba
- Subdistricts: 7

Area
  - Total: 413.632 km^{2} (159.704 sq mi)

Population (2017)
  - Total: 53,312
  - Density: 128.88/km^{2} (333.8/sq mi)
- Time zone: UTC+7 (ICT)
- Postal code: 12170
- Geocode: 1304

Nong Suea (Thai: หนองเสือ, pronounced [nɔ̌ːŋ sɯ̌a̯]) is a district (amphoe) in the eastern part of Pathum Thani province, central Thailand.

== Geography ==
Neighbouring districts are (from the north clockwise): Wang Noi of Phra Nakhon Si Ayutthaya province; Nong Khae and Wihan Daeng of Saraburi province; Ban Na and Ongkharak of Nakhon Nayok province; and Thanyaburi and Khlong Luang of Pathum Thani Province.

== Toponymy ==
Within the district lies a pond that, in the past, attracted tigers descending from the mountains of neighbouring Saraburi and Nakhon Nayok to drink water. This led residents to name it "Nong Suea", which means "tiger pond."

Later, after the tigers had disappeared, a new kind of Suea (Note: In Thai, the word "Suea" (เสือ) means tiger, but it is also commonly used to refer to criminals or bandits.) appeared instead. Nong Suea became known as a hiding place for criminals.

== Administration ==
The district is divided into seven subdistricts (tambons), which are further subdivided into 70 villages (mubans). Nong Suea itself has township status (thesaban tambon) and covers part of tambon Nong Suea. There are seven Tambon Administrative Organizations (TAO).

Nr.	Name	Thai name	Villages
1.	Bueng Ba	บึงบา	9
2.	Bueng Bon	บึงบอน	9
3.	Bueng Ka Sam	บึงกาสาม	9
4.	Bueng Cham O	บึงชำอ้อ	12
5.	Nong Sam Wang	หนองสามวัง	13
6.	Sala Khru	ศาลาครุ	10
7.	Noppharat	นพรัตน์	8

== Economy ==
The condition of Nong Suea at present, despite being more prosperous, but most of the area is still agricultural and wasteland. Most of the population subsists on agriculture.
