= Nakhon Nayok =

Nakhon Nayok นครนายก
- Town Municipality
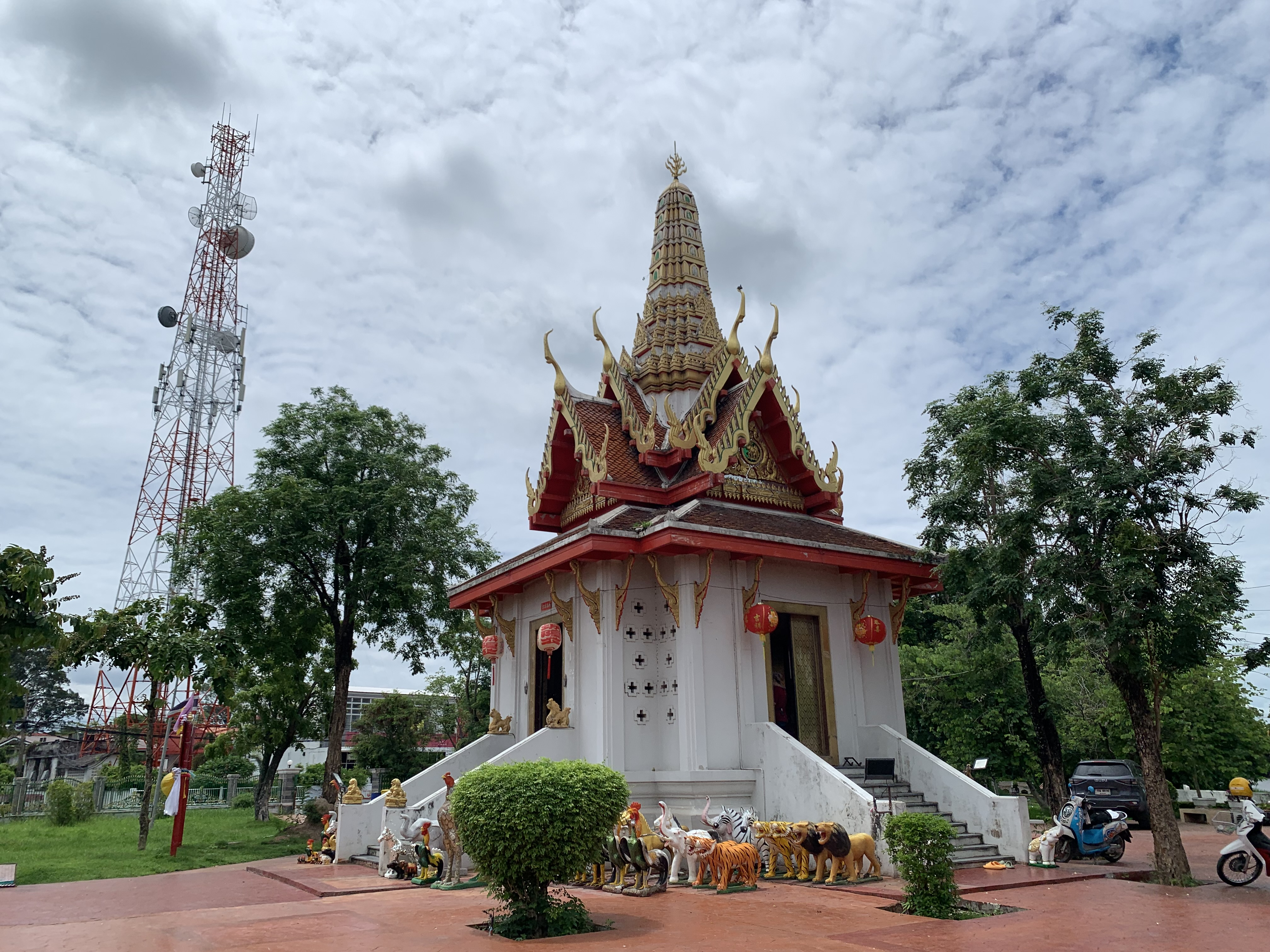
- Nakhon Nayok City Pillar Shrine

- Location within Thailand
- Coordinates: 14°12′25″N 101°12′51″E
- Country: Thailand
- Province: Nakhon Nayok
- District: Mueang Nakhon Nayok

Area
  - Total: 15.9 km^{2} (6.1 sq mi)
- Elevation: 10 m (33 ft)

Population (2023)
  - Total: 15,585
  - Density: 980/km^{2} (2,500/sq mi)
- Time zone: UTC+7 (ICT)
- Postal code: 26000
- Calling code: 037
- ISO 3166 code: TH-260101
- Website: nayokcity.go.th

Nakhon Nayok is a capital of Nakhon Nayok province in the central region of Thailand.

The town (thesaban mueang) covers Nakhon Nayok subdistrict (tambon) and parts of Tha Chang, Ban Yai, Wang Krachom, and Phrommani subdistricts, Mueang Nakhon Nayok district, Nakhon Nayok province. In 2023 it had a population of 15,585. It lies 116 km northeast of Bangkok.

== History ==
On 10 December 1935 the sanitary district was changed into a subdistrict municipality (thesaban tambon}, with an area of 3.4 square kilometres (1.3 sq mi). On 20 September 1985 the municipality was upgraded to town municipality (thesaban mueang), with an area of 15.9 square kilometres (6.1 sq mi).

== Geography ==
The terrain is a lowland. The Nakhon Nayok River meanders through the town.
Neighboring subdistricts are (from the north clockwise) Ban Yai, Wang Krachom and Tha Chang of Mueang Nakhon Nayok district of Nakhon Nayok province.

== Administration ==
=== Central government ===
As of December 2023: the administration of Nakhon Nayok subdistrict (tambon) is responsible for one administrative village (muban) with 7,613 people.

=== Local government ===
Nakhon Nayok town municipality (thesaban mueang) covers the whole subdistrict and parts of Tha Chang, Ban Yai, Wang Krachom and Phrommani subdistricts., with an total area of 9,918 rai ~ 15.9 square kilometres (6.1 sq mi) and a total population of 15,585.

Nakhon Nayok town municipality	Villages	Pop.
Nakhon Nayok subd.	---	7,613
Tha Chang subdistrict	Moo1	1,162
Tha Chang subdistrict	Moo9	198
Tha Chang subdistrict	Moo13	576
Ban Yai subdistrict	Moo2	156
Ban Yai subdistrict	Moo3	285
Ban Yai subdistrict	Moo4	715
Ban Yai subdistrict	Moo5	209
Ban Yai subdistrict	Moo6	139
Ban Yai subdistrict	Moo7	1,830
Wang Krachom subdistrict	Moo1	407
Wang Krachom subdistrict	Moo2	888
Wang Krachom subdistrict	Moo4	431
Phrommani subdistrict	Moo10	976
	Total	15,585

== Education ==
There are the following schools:

- Wat Si Muang municipal 1 school
- Ban Talat Kao municipal 2 school
- Ban Tom Bunsiri municipal 3 school
- Nakhon Nayok Witthayakhom school
- Nawamintharachanusorn school
- La-oruthis demonstration school
- Lianhua school
- Tri-lingual Smart school
- Nakhon Nayok Commercial Technological college
- Nakhon Nayok Technical college
- Veeraphat Technological college

== Healthcare ==
There is no health promoting hospital in Nakhon Nayok subdistrict, but there is Nakhon Nayok general hospital with 314 beds.

== Temples ==
Nakhon Nayok town is home to the following active temples, where Theravada Buddhism is practiced by local residents:

Temple name	Thai	Location
Wat Bunnakrakkhitaram	วัดบุญนาครักขิดารรม	Mueang
Wat Phothi Nayok	วัดโพธินายก	Mueang
Wat Si Muang	วัดศรีเมือง	Mueang
Wat Sompoi	วัดส้มป่อย	Mueang
Wat Intharam	วัดอินทาราม	Mueang
Wat Nang Hong	วัดนางหงษ์	Tha Chang Moo13
Wat Pho Sai	วัดโพธิ์ไทร	Ban Yai Moo2
Wat Bung Krabao	วัดบุ่งกระเบา	Ban Yai Moo5
Wat Phrammani	วัดพราหมณี	Ban Yai Moo5
Wat Wang Sai	วัดวังไทร	Ban Yai Moo6

== Economy ==
Some people are fishermen or work in the fourteen fish and seafood processing factories:
One in Khao Niwet and Ngao, two in Pak Nam and Bang Non and eight in Bang Rin.

== Transportation ==
- Highway 33 to Prachinburi in the south.
- Highway 305 to Rangsit in the west.

== Electricity ==
All households in Nakhon Nayok town municipality have access to the electricity network. However, public electricity does not cover all areas in the community, because some roads are not public areas.

== Waterworks ==
All households in Nakhon Nayok town municipality have access to the waterworks network.
