= Ongkharak district =

Ongkharak องครักษ์
- District
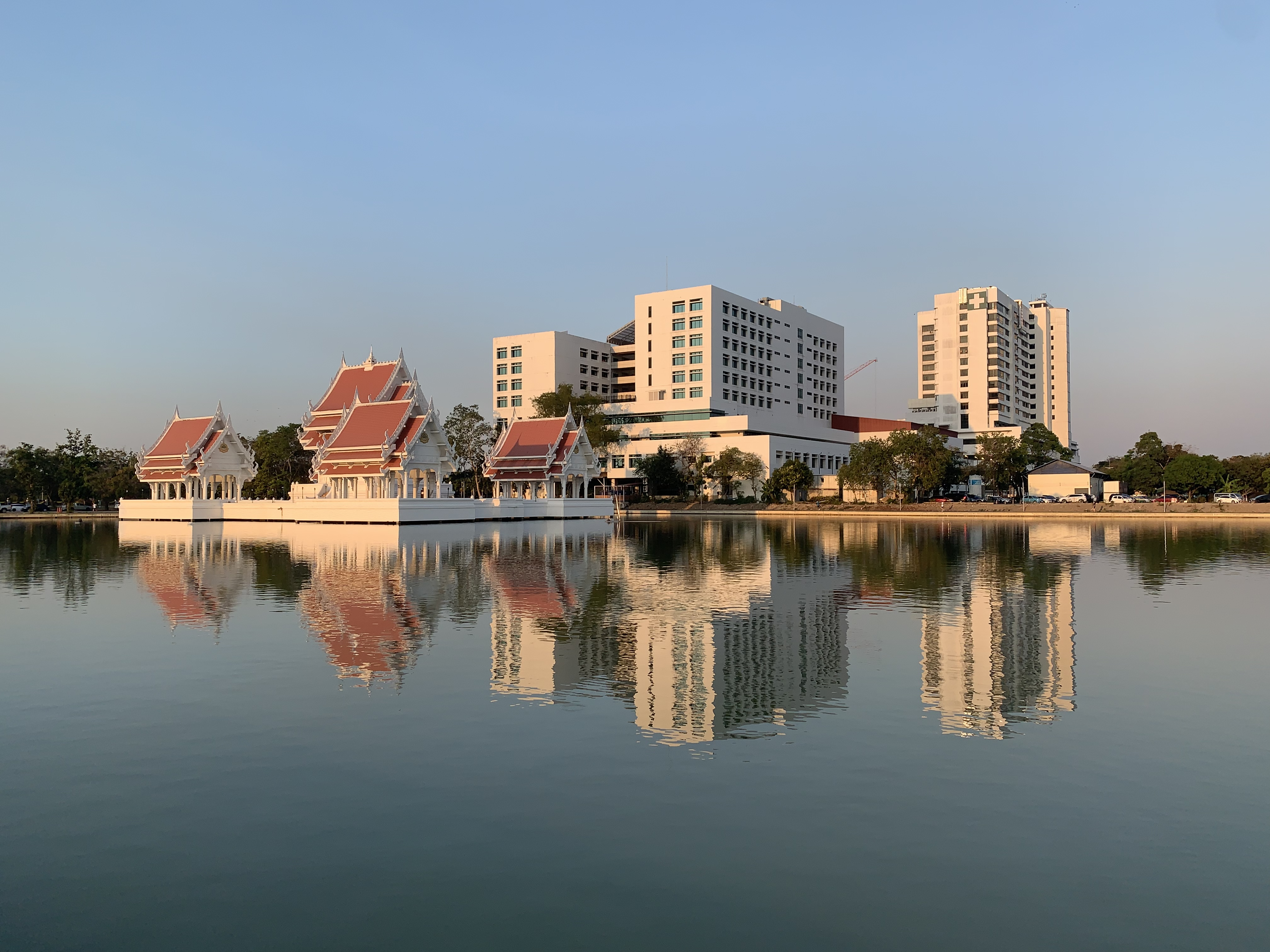
- Buddharupa Shrine (Hor Phra), Faculty of Medicine and Maha Chakri Srinidhorn Medical Centre of Srinakharinwirot University's Ongkharak Campus

- District location in Nakhon Nayok province
- Country: Thailand
- Province: Nakhon Nayok

Area
  - Total: 486.4 km^{2} (187.8 sq mi)

Population (2023)
  - Total: 62,823
  - Density: 129/km^{2} (330/sq mi)
- Time zone: UTC+7 (ICT)
- Postal code: 26120
- Calling code: 037
- ISO 3166 code: TH-2604

Ongkharak (Thai: องครักษ์, pronounced [ʔōŋ.kʰā.rák]) is a district (amphoe) in the western part of Nakhon Nayok province, central Thailand.

Once King Chulalongkorn (Rama V) visited Mueang Nakhon Nayok. When he and his company arrived in the area of Ongkharak District, one of the royal guard fell ill and died. The king ordered a shrine built to commemorate his servant. Ongkharak means 'royal guard'.

== History ==
The old district office of Ongkharak was in Tambon Bang O (now in Ban Na district). In 1889 King Chulalongkorn ordered the construction of the Rangsit Canal, a canal that links the Chao Phraya and Nakhon Nayok Rivers. The water gate in the Chao Phraya River was named Chulalongkorn Water Gate (ประตูน้ำจุฬาลงกรณ์), and its corresponding gate in the Nakhon Nayok River was named Saovabha Bhongsi Water Gate (ประตูน้ำเสาวภาผ่องศรี). The district office was moved near the 16th Khlong of Khlong Rangsit. Twenty years later, the office moved to a place next to the Saovabha Bhongsi Water Gate. Now the district office is behind Saovabha Market, 500 m from the old office.
Originally, Ongkharak district was divided into seven subdistricts (tambons). In 1968, Pho Thaen (no.4) was separated from Bang Pla Kot (no.7). In 1969, Bang Sombun (no.5) was separated from Bang Luk Suea (no.8). In 1984, Chumphon (no.10) was separated from Bueng San (no.2). In 1990, Khlong Yai (no.11) was separated from Ongkharak (no.9).

== Geography ==
Neighboring districts are (from the northeast clockwise): Ban Na and Mueang Nakhon Nayok of Nakhon Nayok Province; Ban Sang of Prachinburi province; Bang Nam Priao of Chachoengsao province; Lam Luk Ka, Thanyaburi, and Nong Suea of Pathum Thani province.

The important water resources are the Nakhon Nayok River and Khlong Rangsit.

== Religion ==
There are thirty-three Theravada Buddhist temples in the district.
One in Bueng San, Chumphon, Khlong Yai, Pho Thaen and Phra Achan, three in Ongkharak and Sai Mun, five in Bang Luk Suae and Bang Pla Kot, six in Bang Sombun and Sisa Krabue.
In Phra Achan and Chumphon subdistricts have Muslims their eleven mosques.

== Administration ==
=== Central government ===
The district is divided into eleven subdistricts (tambons), which are further subdivided into 116 villages (mubans).

Map with eleven subdistricts

No.	Subdistricts	Thai	Villages	Pop.
1.	Phra Achan	พระอาจารย์	13	6,571
2.	Bueng San	บึงศาล	9	6,231
3.	Sisa Krabue	ศีรษะกระบือ	13	7,045
4.	Pho Thaen	โพธิ์แทน	9	4,606
5.	Bang Sombun	บางสมบูรณ์	13	3,933
6.	Sai Mun	ทรายมูล	11	5,779
7.	Bang Pla Kot	บางปลากด	11	8,065
8.	Bang Luk Suea	บางลูกเสือ	12	3,601
9.	Ongkharak	องครักษ์	7	7,135
10.	Chumphon	ชุมพล	8	5,981
11.	Khlong Yai	คลองใหญ่	10	6,441
		Total	116	62,823

=== Local government ===
As of December 2023 there is : Ongkharak subd. municipality (thesaban tambon) and covers parts of Ongkharak and Sai Mun subdistricts. There are further eleven subdistricts administrative organizations - SAO (ongkan borihan suan tambon - o bo toh).

Ongkharak subd. municipality	Pop.	website
Ongkharak	2,160	ongkarak.go.th
Sai Mun	405	
Total	2,565	

Subdistrict adm.org.-SAO	Pop.	website
Bang Pla Kot	8,065	bangplakod.go.th
Sisa Krabue	7,045	sites.google.com/view/srisakrabue
Phra Achan	6,571	phra-arjan.go.th
Bueng San	6,231	buengsan.go.th
Khlong Yai	6,441	saoklongyai.go.th
Chumphon	5,981	chumphon-sao.go.th
Sai Mun	5,374	saimoon-nyk.com
Ongkharak	4,975	sao-ongkarak.go.th
Pho Thaen	4,606	photan.go.th
Bang Sombun	3,933	bangsomboon.go.th
Bang Luk Suea	3,601	bangluksuea.go.th

== Education ==
=== Higher education ===
- Srinakharinwirot University's, Ongkharak campus is in the district.
- St.Theresa International University.

=== Primary/secondary education ===
There are 36 primary and 2 secondary schools in the district.

== Healthcare ==
=== Government hospitals ===
There are two hospitals in Ongkharak district.

- Ongkharak hospital with 31 beds.
- HRH Princess Maha Chakri Sirindhorn Medical Center with 500 beds is the teaching hospital of the Faculty of Medicine of Srinakharinwirot University.

=== Health-promoting hospitals ===
There are total 15 health-promoting hospitals in the districts, of which; one in Bueng San, Pho Thaen, Bang Pla Kot, Bang Luk Suea and Chumphon and two in Phra Achan, Sisa Krabue, Bang Sombun, Sai Mun and Khlong Yai.
