= Nong Khae district =

Nong Khae หนองแค
- District
- District location in Saraburi province
- Coordinates: 14°20′21″N 100°51′42″E
- Country: Thailand
- Province: Saraburi

Area
  - Total: 262.867 km^{2} (101.494 sq mi)

Population (2000)
  - Total: 88,213
  - Density: 335.58/km^{2} (869.15/sq mi)
- Time zone: UTC+7 (ICT)
- Postal code: 18140
- Geocode: 1903

Nong Khae (Thai: หนองแค, pronounced [nɔ̌ːŋ kʰɛ̄ː]) is a district (amphoe) in the southern part of Saraburi province, central Thailand.

== History ==
Records show that the district existed in 1899.

Nong Khae has the Na Roeng khlong (canal) that connects to the Pa Sak River. The Ayutthaya Kingdom army moved their troops by this canal for military purposes.

Recently there has been immigration of people from Lan Na and Vientiane to this district.

== Geography ==
Neighboring districts are (from the north clockwise): Nong Saeng, Mueang Saraburi, and Wihan Daeng of Saraburi Province; Nong Suea of Pathum Thani province; and Wang Noi, Uthai, and Phachi of Ayutthaya province.

== Administration ==
The district is divided into 18 sub-districts (tambons), which are further subdivided into 181 villages (mubans). There are three municipal (thesaban) areas, and a further 16 tambon administrative organizations (TAO).

No.	Name	Thai
1.	Nong Khae	หนองแค
2.	Kum Hak	กุ่มหัก
3.	Khotchasit	คชสิทธิ์
4.	Khok Tum	โคกตูม
5.	Khok Yae	โคกแย้
6.	Bua Loi	บัวลอย
7.	Phai Tam	ไผ่ต่ำ
8.	Phon Thong	โพนทอง
9.	Huai Khamin	ห้วยขมิ้น
10.	Huai Sai	ห้วยทราย
11.	Nong Khai Nam	หนองไข่น้ำ
12.	Nong Khaem	หนองแขม
13.	Nong Chik	หนองจิก
14.	Nong Chorakhe	หนองจรเข้
15.	Nong Nak	หนองนาก
16.	Nong Pla Mo	หนองปลาหมอ
17.	Nong Pling	หนองปลิง
18.	Nong Rong	หนองโรง

== Economy ==
Nong Khae has many industrial estates. The economy is considered good.
