= Wang Noi district =

Wang Noi วังน้อย
- District
- District location in Ayutthaya province
- Coordinates: 14°13′36″N 100°42′55″E
- Country: Thailand
- Province: Ayutthaya
- Tambon: 10
- Seat: Lam Sai

Area
  - Total: 219.2 km^{2} (84.6 sq mi)

Population (2007)
  - Total: 64,130
  - Density: 292.6/km^{2} (757.7/sq mi)
- Time zone: UTC+7 (ICT)
- Postal code: 13170
- Geocode: 1411

Wang Noi (Thai: วังน้อย, pronounced [wāŋ nɔ́ːj]) is a district (amphoe) in Ayutthaya province, Thailand, 50 km north of Bangkok. The population of Wang Noi were mostly farmers but now this area is industrial.

== Geography ==
The district is in the southeastern part of Ayutthaya province. Neighboring districts are (from the east clockwise) Nong Khae, Saraburi province, Nong Suea and Khlong Luang of Pathum Thani province, and Bang Pa-in and Uthai of Ayutthaya province.

== History ==
The district was split off from Uthai District in 1907. At first named Uthai Noi (อุทัยน้อย), it was renamed Wang Noi in 1917.

== Economy ==
As the district lies along a long stretch of Phahonyothin Road (National Highway 1) as it leaves Greater Bangkok, Wang Noi has become a logistics hub, hosting warehouses for a broad range of industries. The district is the site of one of Thailand Post's (THP) fully automated sorting centers. As of 2018, THP is negotiating to purchase 100 rai of land to house the facility.

== Administration ==
The district is divided into 10 sub-districts (tambon), which are further subdivided into 68 villages (muban). Lam Ta Sao is a sub-district municipality (thesaban tambon), which covers the whole sub-district Lam Ta Sao and parts of Bo Ta Lo, Lam Sai, and Chamaep. There are a further nine tambon administrative organizations (TAO) for the non-municipal areas.

No.	Name	Thai	Pop.
1.	Lam Ta Sao	ลำตาเสา	14,365
2.	Bo Ta Lo	บ่อตาโล่	6,314
3.	Wang Noi	วังน้อย	4,718
4.	Lam Sai	ลำไทร	9,196
5.	Sanap Thuep	สนับทึบ	4,085
6.	Phayom	พยอม	11,434
7.	Han Taphao	หันตะเภา	3,123
8.	Wang Chula	วังจุฬา	3,478
9.	Khao Ngam	ข้าวงาม	2,300
10.	Chamaep	ชะแมบ	5,117
