= Ban Na district =

Ban Na บ้านนา
- District
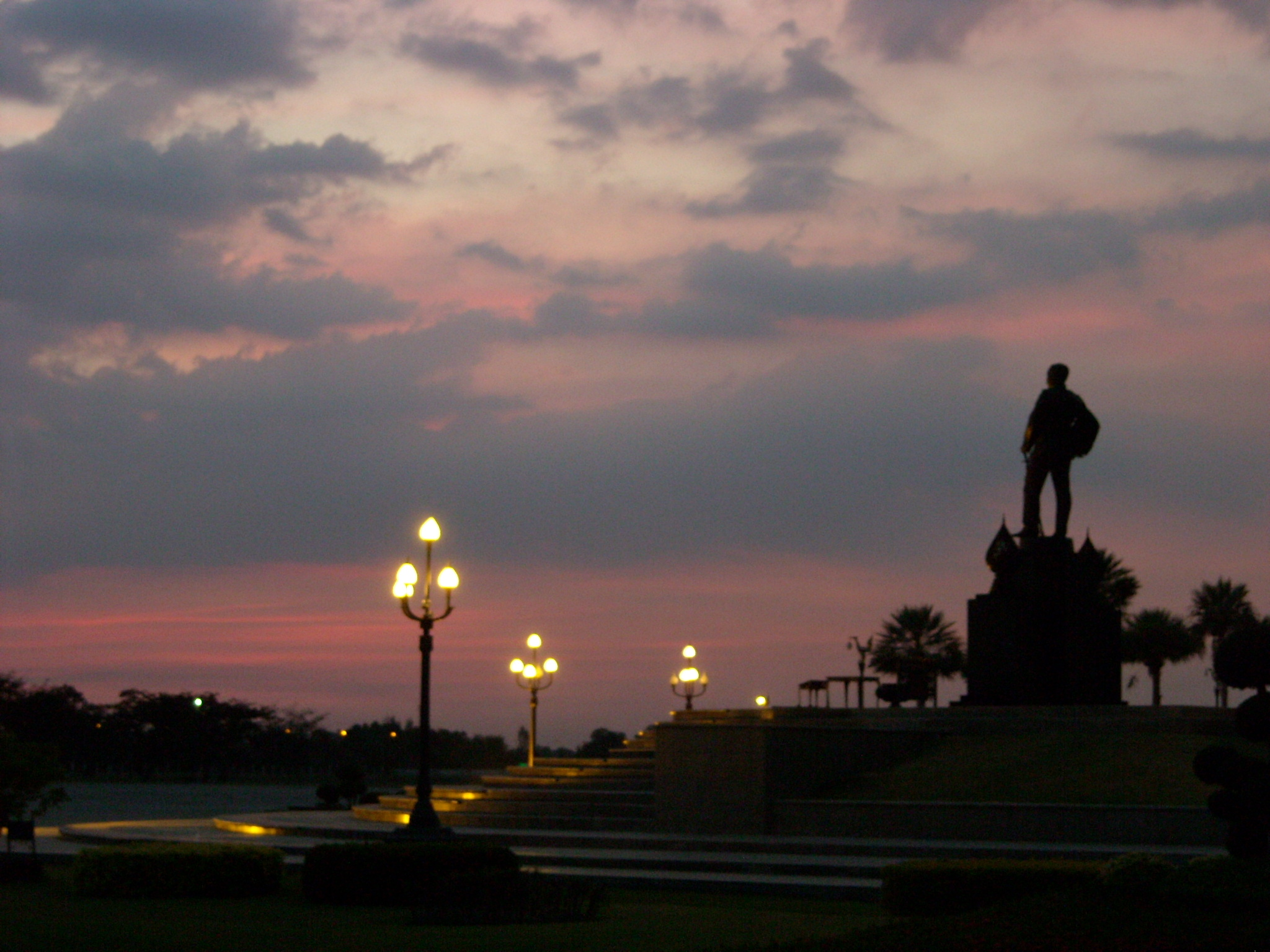
- Statue of King Chulalongkorn the Great at Armed Forces Academies Preparatory School

- District location in Nakhon Nayok province
- Coordinates: 14°16′0″N 101°3′41″E
- Country: Thailand
- Province: Nakhon Nayok
- Seat: Ban Na

Area
  - Total: 388.4 km^{2} (150.0 sq mi)

Population (2023)
  - Total: 68,821
  - Density: 177/km^{2} (460/sq mi)
- Time zone: UTC+7 (ICT)
- Postal code: 26110
- Calling code: 037
- ISO 3166 code: TH-2603

Ban Na (Thai: บ้านนา, pronounced [bâːn nāː]) is a district (amphoe) in the western part of Nakhon Nayok province, central Thailand.

== History ==
In the Ayutthaya era, the people of Tambon Pa Kha were elephant catchers (กองโพนช้าง), catching wild elephants to use as war elephants.

Ban Na district was established in 1903, then named Tha Chang District. As the original district office in Tambon Bang O was inconvenient for transportation and prone for flooding, the government moved the office to Suwannason Road in 1965.

When Nakhon Nayok Province was downgraded, the government transferred Ban Na District to Saraburi province. It became a district of Nakhon Nayok again on 9 May 1946 when the province was re-established.

== Geography ==
Neighboring districts are (from the east clockwise) Mueang Nakhon Nayok and Ongkharak of Nakhon Nayok Province; Nong Suea of Pathum Thani province; and Wihan Daeng and Kaeng Khoi of Saraburi province.

The important water resource is Khlong Ban Na.

== Administration ==
=== Central government ===
The district is divided into 10 subdistricts (tambons), which are further subdivided into 116 villages (mubans).

Map with ten subdistrict

No.	Subdistrict	Thai	Villages	Pop.
1.	Ban Na	บ้านนา	11	8,077
2.	Ban Phrao	บ้านพร้าว	12	5,221
3.	Ban Phrik	บ้านพริก	12	10,724
4.	Asa	อาษา	8	2,509
5.	Thonglang	ทองหลาง	8	5,053
6.	Bang O	บางอ้อ	14	4,058
7.	Phikun Ok	พิกุลออก	12	5,719
8.	Pa Kha	ป่าขะ	13	8,749
9.	Khao Phoem	เขาเพิ่ม	16	8,198
10.	Si Ka-ang	ศรีกะอาง	10	10,513
		Total	116	68,821

=== Local government ===
As of December 2023 there are two subdistrict municipalitues (thesaban tambon). Ban Na covers halve of Ban Na subdistrict and a small part of Phikun Ok subdistrict. Phikun Ok covers the remaining part of Phikun Ok subdistrict. There are nine subdistrict administrative organizations - SAO (ongkan borihan suan tambon - o bo toh).

Ban Na subdistrict mun.	Pop.	website
Ban Na	4,283	banna-city.go.th
Phikun Ok	348	
Total	4,631	

Subdistrict municipality	Pop.	website
Phikun Ok	5,371	pikulook.go.th

Subdistrict adm.org.-SAO	Pop.	website
Ban Phrik	10,724	banprik.go.th
Si Ka-ang	10,513	srikaang.go.th
Pa Kha	8,749	pakha-banna.go.th
Khao Phoem	8,198	khaophoem.go.th
Ban Phrao	5,221	banpraow.go.th
Thonglang	5,053	thonglang.go.th
Bang O	4,058	bangor.go.th
Ban Na	3,794	bannanyk.go.th
Asa	2,509	arsa.go.th

== Healthcare ==
=== Government hospitals ===
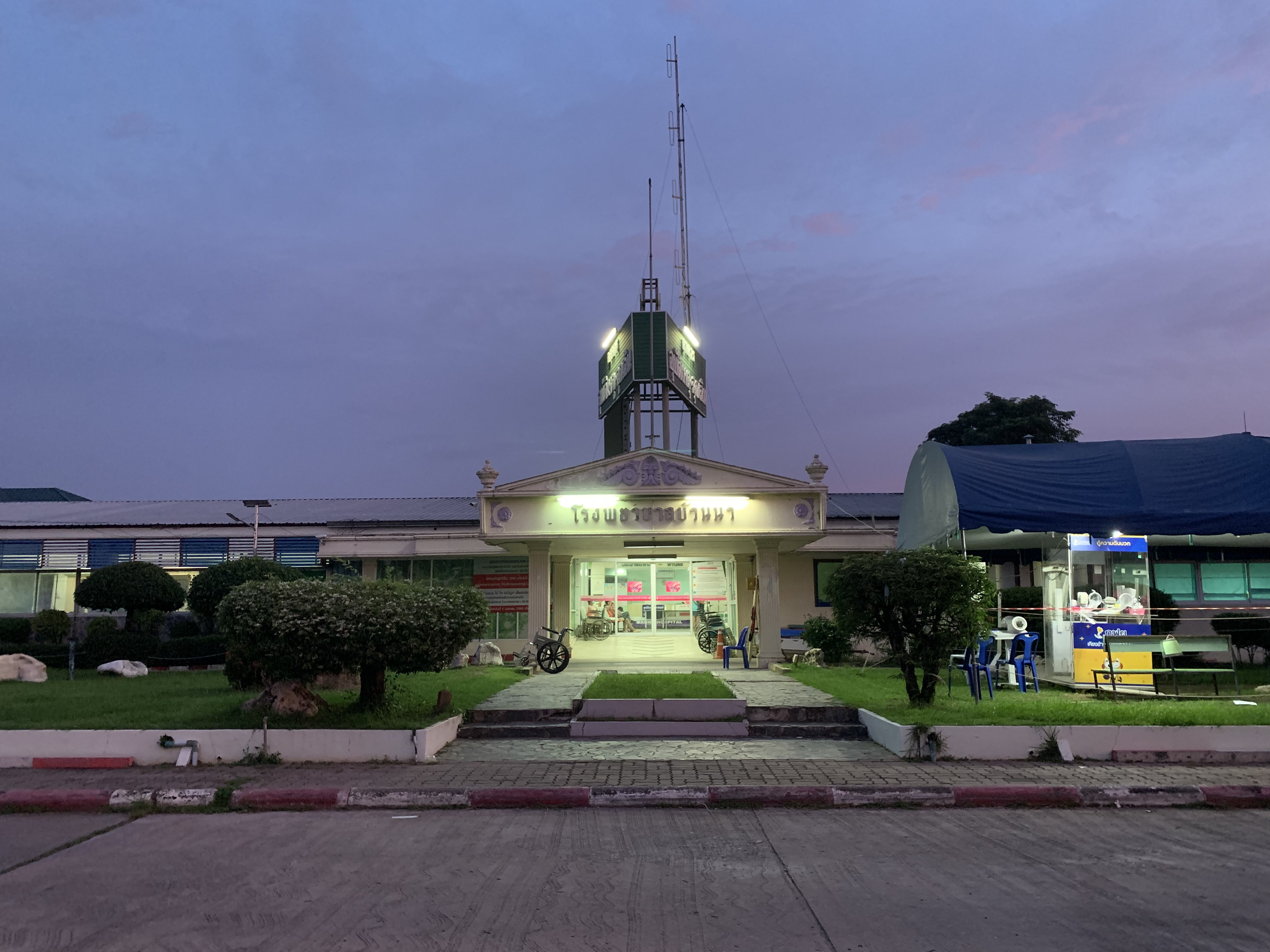
Ban Na Hospital

There is Ban Na community hospital with 70 beds.

=== Health-promoting hospitals ===
There are total 14 health-promoting hospitals in the district, of which; one in Asa, Bang O, Phikun Ok, Pa Kha and Si Ka-ang and two in Ban Phrao, Ban Phrik and Thonglang and three in Khao Phoem.

== Religion ==
There are fifty-five Theravada Buddhist temples in the district.
Three in Bang O, four in Asa and Thonglang, five in Ban Na, Ban Phrao, Pa Kha and Phikun Ok, seven in Khao Phoem, eight in Si Ka-ang and nine in Ban Phrik.
