= Wat Phrammani =

Coordinates: 14.2355°N 101.2461°E

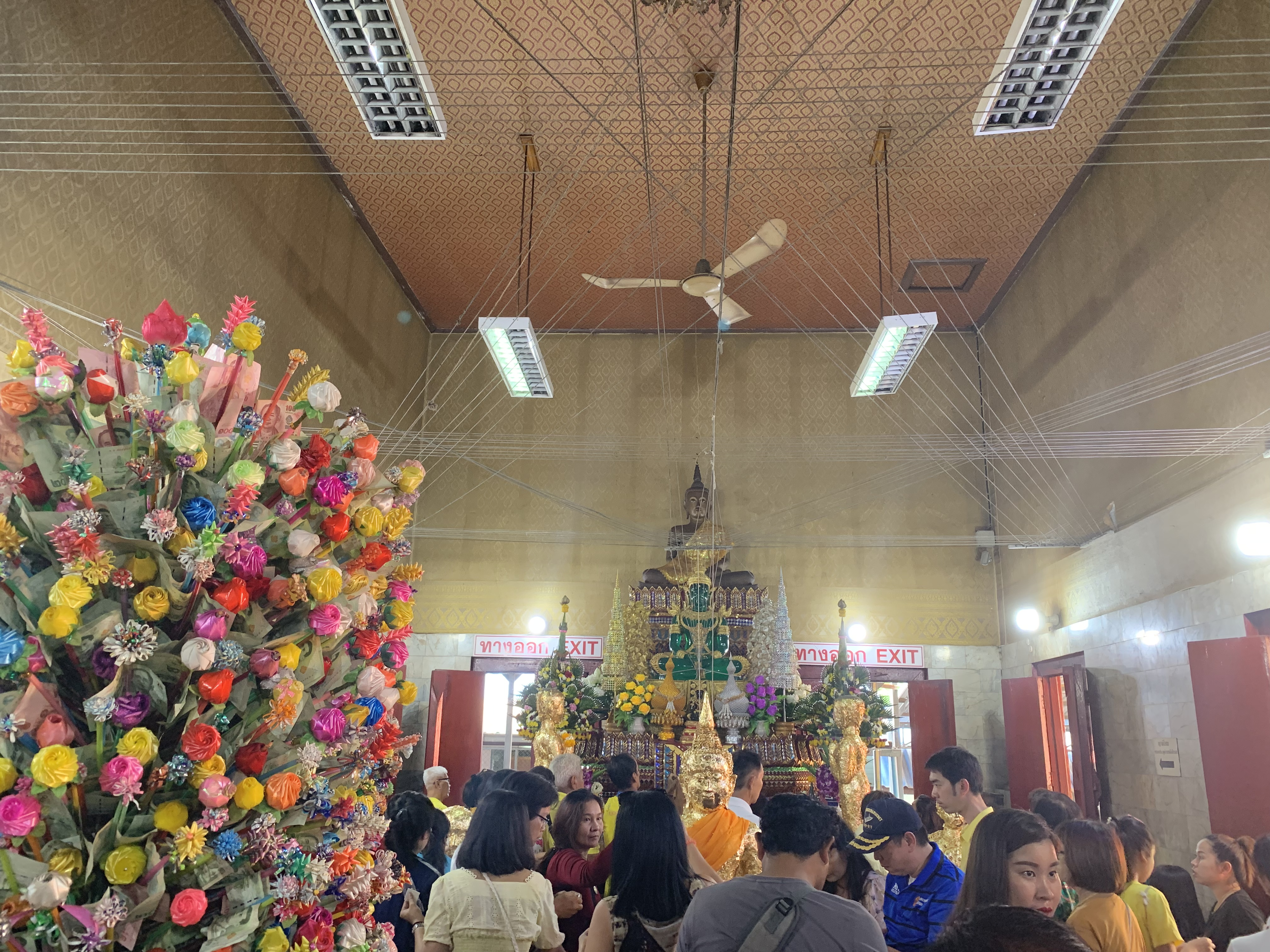
Luang Phor Pak Daeng

Wat Phrammani (Thai: วัดพราหมณี), also known as Wat Luang Phor Pak Daeng (วัดหลวงพ่อปากแดง), is a Buddhist temple (wat) in Nakhon Nayok Province, Thailand. The temple was built during the reign of King Rama I of Thailand.
