= Bang Mot tangerine =

Tangerine cultivar

- Species: Citrus reticulata
- Cultivar: 'Bang Mot'
- Origin: Bangkok, Thailand

The Bang Mot tangerine (Thai: ส้มบางมด, RTGS: som Bang Mot, pronounced [sôm bāːŋ mót]) is a local cultivar of the mandarin orange grown in the Bang Mot area of Thon Buri, Bangkok, Thailand. Despite its common name, it is a mandarin orange of the species Citrus reticulata and not a tangerine (Citrus tangerina). In 1924, a local farmer brought cuttings from a mandarin grove in Bangkok Noi District and planted them at Bang Mot, Thung Khru District near Bang Mot canal in 1924. This area has very fertile soil with elevated levels of potassium giving the fruit a sweet-sour taste. There were up to 96 square kilometres (37 sq mi) of tangerine groves in the past.

Flooding in Thon Buri in 1967 killed many of the Bang Mot tangerine trees. The floods made many farmers reluctant to plant it again. Rapid urban expansion of Bangkok also reduced the land available for planting. They then moved the plant to Rangsit canal, until becoming another famous tangerine, Rangsit tangerine

== Appearance ==
The Bang Mot tangerine has a flat, smooth, thin skin with juicy, orange flesh inside. The sections separate easily. Bang Mot tangerines are sweet and slightly sour-tasting. The Bang Mot tangerine has a stronger taste than other tangerines.

== Diseases ==
=== Root and stem rot ===
The symptoms are caused by a fungus that begins on the stem near the ground. This will cause the tangerine to have black marks on the skin. Then the skin will change from orange to brown and rot, leaves will be pale yellow and fall. The branches will dry out and die.

=== Greening disease ===
This occurs if the plant hopper carries pathogens to orange trees. The leaves will be pale yellow and thinner than normal, and the fruit will be smaller than normal.

== Pests ==
Important pests are leaf miners and caterpillars. Leaf miners will eat the leaves, causing a white zigzag line on the leaves. The leaf miner keeps leaves from growing. It can come every season, and it can cause severe damage to growing leaves. Caterpillars eat young tangerine leaves. When caterpillars hatch they start to eat leaves immediately. Caterpillar damage can kill tangerine trees.
