= Mueang Nakhon Nayok district =

Mueang Nakhon Nayok เมืองนครนายก
- District
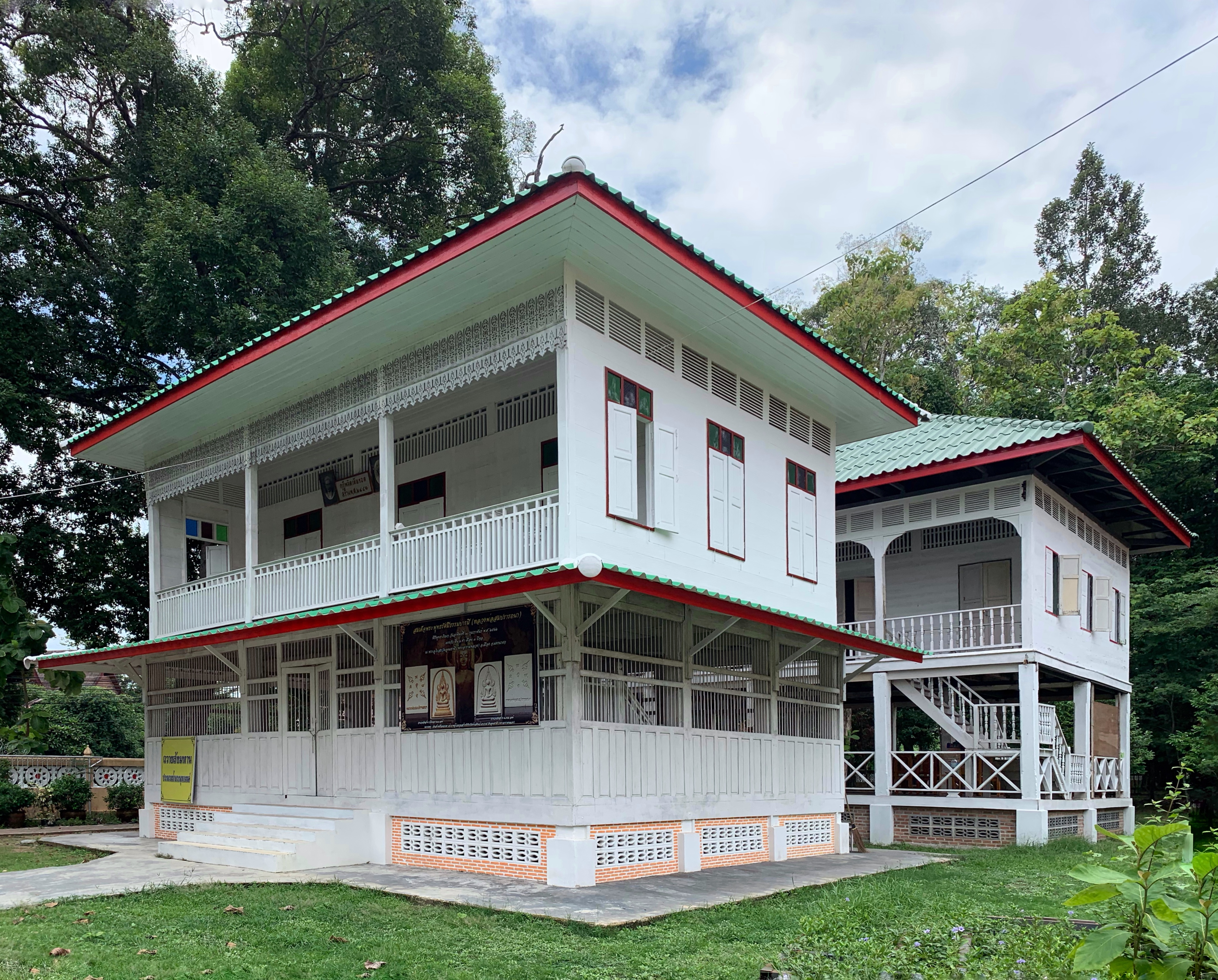
- A monk cell at Wat Udom Thani, built in 1937

- District location in Nakhon Nayok province
- Coordinates: 14°12′13″N 101°13′2″E
- Country: Thailand
- Province: Nakhon Nayok

Area
  - Total: 728.1 km^{2} (281.1 sq mi)

Population (2023)
  - Total: 101,897
  - Density: 140/km^{2} (360/sq mi)
- Time zone: UTC+7 (ICT)
- Postal code: 26000
- Calling code: 037
- ISO 3166 code: TH-2601

Mueang Nakhon Nayok (Thai: เมืองนครนายก, pronounced [mɯ̄a̯ŋ ná(ʔ).kʰɔ̄ːn nāː.jók]) is the capital district (amphoe mueang) of Nakhon Nayok province, central Thailand.

== History ==
Mueang Nakhon Nayok is an ancient city. In the Ayutthaya kingdom it was the eastern frontier city. The historians found the old city wall on three sides, the southern side was protected by the Nakhon Nayok River as a natural city wall.

The moated site of Mueang Boran Dong Lakhon, in the subdistrict of the same name, lies on a former shoreline of the Gulf of Thailand and has been occupied since at least the sixth century. In a survey of fifteen moated sites of eastern Thailand by Patcharaporn Ngernkerd and colleagues it is a village, the smallest of three ranks, measuring 0.38 km² within its moat. A group of Buddhist buildings stands at its outer moat, following the pattern of Dvaravati towns of the central plain, and a Pali inscription carrying the ye dhammā formula has been recovered there.

The district was called Wang Krachom as the office was in Tambon Wang Krachom, on the left bank of the Nakhon Nayok River. In 1896 the government moved the district office to the right bank of the river. The district office was moved to the old provincial court building in 1931. A new district office was opened on 18 January 1953.

The district name was changed to Mueang Nakhon Nayok on 1 January 1939, to correspond with the name of the province. On 1 January 1943, the government downgraded Nakhon Nayok Province and combined it with Prachinburi province, except Ban Na which became part of Saraburi province. During that time the district was called Nakhon Nayok District. On 9 May 1946, the government re-established Nakhon Nayok Province, thus the district was renamed Mueang Nakhon Nayok.

== Geography ==
Neighboring districts are (from the southwest clockwise) Ongkharak, Ban Na of Nakhon Nayok Province, Kaeng Khoi, Muak Lek of Saraburi province, Pak Chong of Nakhon Ratchasima province, Pak Phli of Nakhon Nayok Province and Ban Sang of Prachinburi province.

The Sankamphaeng Range mountainous area is in the northern section of this district. The Nakhon Nayok River and Khlong Tha Dan are important water resources.

== Education ==
- Chulachomklao Royal Military Academy is in Phrommani Subdistrict, Mueang Nakhon Nayok District.

== Administration ==
=== Cantral government ===
The district is divided into thirteen subdistricts (tambons), which are further subdivided into 125 villages mubans).

Map with thirteen subdistricts

No.	Subdistricts	Thai	Villages	Pop.
1.	Nakhon Nayok	นครนายก	-	7,613
2.	Tha Chang	ท่าช้าง	13	7,944
3.	Ban Yai	บ้านใหญ่	7	7,776
4.	Wang Krachom	วังกระโจม	7	4,463
5.	Tha Sai	ท่าทราย	7	3,393
6.	Don Yo	ดอนยอ	7	4,878
7.	Si Chula	ศรีจุฬา	12	5,876
8.	Dong Lakhon	ดงละคร	13	8,119
9.	Si Nawa	ศรีนาวา	8	5,325
10.	Sarika	สาริกา	12	10,969
11.	Hin Tang	หินตั้ง	9	5,752
12.	Khao Phra	เขาพระ	13	9,269
13.	Phrommani	พรหมณี	17	19,544
		Total	125	101,897

=== Local government ===
As of December 2023 there are: two municipalities (thesaban), of which Nakhon Nayok itself has town status (thesaban mueang) and covers subdistrict Nakhon Nayok and parts of Tha Chang, Ban Yai, Wang Krachom and Phrommani subdistricts. Tha Chang subdistrict municipality (thesaban tambon) covers part of the subdistrict. There are further twelve subdistrict administrative organizations - SAO (ongkan borihan suan tambon -o bo to)

Nakhon Nayok town municipality	Pop.	website
Nakhon Nayok	7,613	nayokcity.go.th
Tha Chang	1,963	
Ban Yai	3,334	
Wang Krachom	1,726	
Phrommani	976	
Total	15,585	

Subdistrict municipality	Pop.	website
Tha Chang	1,040	thachangmu.go.th

Subdistrict adm.org.-SAO	Pop.	website
Phrommani	19,544	prommanee.go.th
Sarika	10,969	sarika.go.th
Dong Lakhon	8,119	donglakhon.go.th
Khao Phra	9,269	kaopralocal.go.th
Si Chula	5,876	srichula.go.th
Hin Tang	5,752	htsao.go.th
Si Nawa	5,325	srinawa.go.th
Tha Chang	4,941	tambonthachang.go.th
Don Yo	4,878	donyor.go.th
Ban Yai	4,442	banyai.go.th
Tha Sai	3,393	thasainyk.go.th
Wang Krachom	2,737	wangkrajom.go.th

== Healthcare ==
=== Government hospitals ===
Nakhon Nayok general hospital with 314 beds.
Chulachomklao Royal Military Academy Hospital with 90 beds.

=== Health-promoting hospitals ===
There are total 17 health-promoting hospitals in the district, of which; one in Wang Krachom, Tha Sai, Don Yo, Si Nawa and Hin Tang and two in Si Chula, Dong Lakhon and Khao Phra and three in Sarika and Phrommani.

== Religion ==
There are ninety-five Theravada Buddhist temples in the district.
One in Wang Krachom, two in Don Yo, four in Tha Sai, five in Nakhon Nayok and Tha Chang, six in Hin Tang and Si Chula, eight in Don Lakhon, nine in Ban Yai and Si Nawa, twelve in Khao Phra and Phrommani and sixteen in Sarika.
