= Khlong Bang Mot =

Canal in Bangkok, Thailand

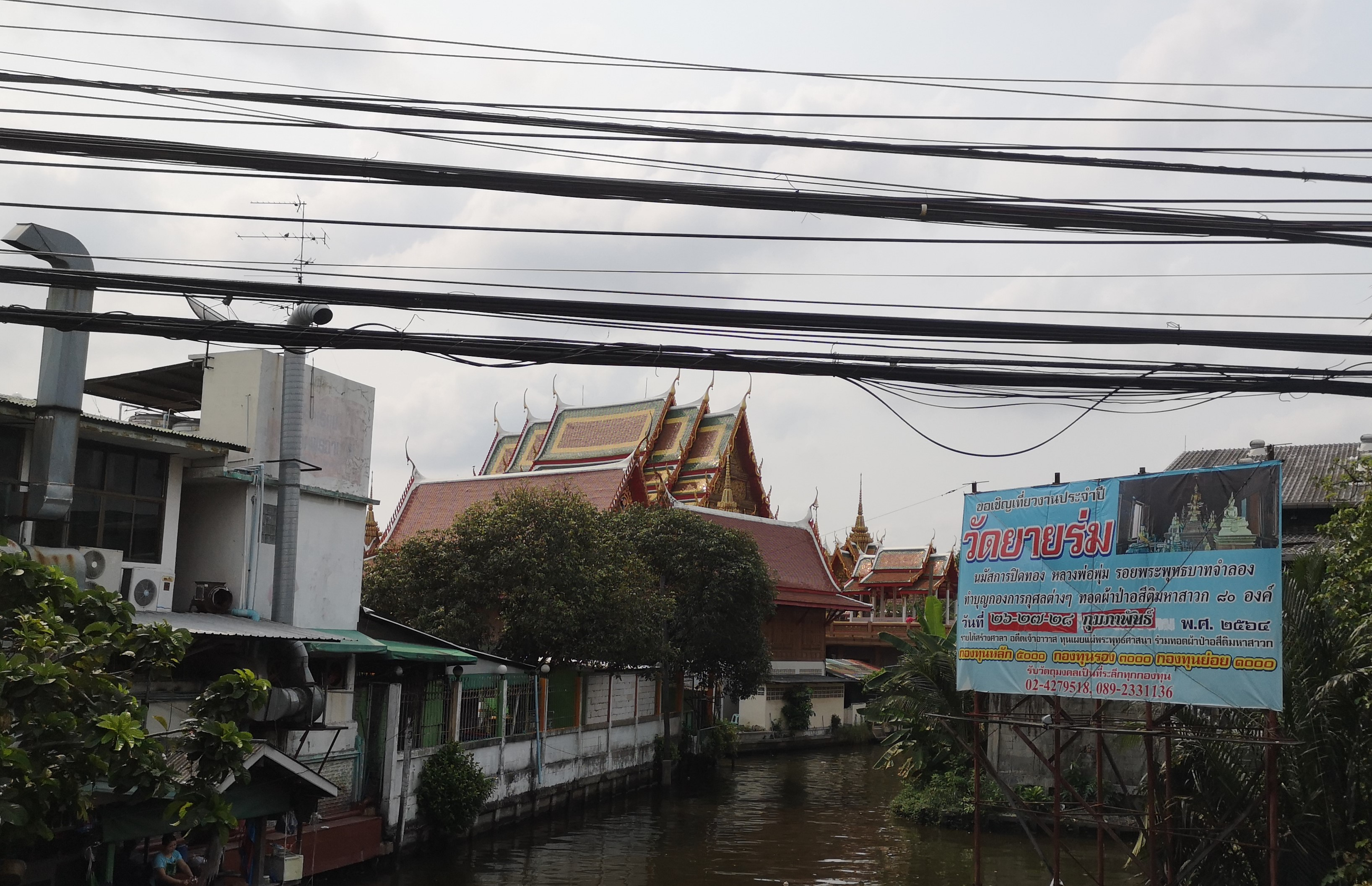
Khlong Bang Mot in the area of Wat Yai Rom

Khlong Bang Mot (Thai: คลองบางมด, pronounced [kʰlɔ̄ːŋ bāːŋ mót]; also spelled Bangmod; literally: "place of ants") is a khlong (canal) in central Thailand. It is located at a natural border between the Bang Khun Thian and the Thung Khru districts. The canal is approximately 5.67 kilometers (3.5232 miles) in length. Most of the area consists of plantations and farms. During the reign of King Nangklao, also known as King Rama III (Thai: พระบาทสมเด็จพระนั่งเกล้าเจ้าอยู่หัว), Thailand started to trade agricultural products with other countries. Since then, Bang Mot tangerine have become its most famous product and are largely produced in the Bang Mot area. The Bang Mot canal connects to more than 40 others, facilitating the transport of products across markets.

== Transport ==
Khlong Bang Mot has a popular floating market. The canal has bicycle lanes that stretch for 3-4 kilometers alongside the canal. These lanes link with BTS Wutthakat Station. Thailand's sky train (Thai: สถานีวุฒากาศ) provides tourist transportation.

== Places of interest ==
- Phuttha Bucha temple (Thai: วัดพุทธบูชา) has a statue of Buddha, modeled on Buddha Chinnarat that came from Phitsanulok Province (Thai: จังหวัดพิษณุโลก). Several types of fish live in the temple's pier, such as the black ear catfish and striped catfish. Feeding fish has become a popular activity.
- The Wat Yai Rom (Thai: วัดยายร่ม) is an old temple. This temple was built around 1822; the original name is Wat Chulamanee (Thai: วัดจุฬามณี). The church of the temple Yai Rom distinguishes itself from others in that the Abbot adopted the style of Lanna wood carvings instead of painting murals, wall art and the technician from San Kamphaeng and the craftsman of Doi Saket, Chiang Mai carver. This temple's museum recounts the history of the Bangmod canal. It tells the story since King Rama III who ordered the construction of the canal.
- Mot Daeng Orchard (Thai: สวนส้มมดแดง) is the last Bang Mot tangerine orchard in Bang Mot area operated and owned by Kittisak "Uncle Daeng" Khwanbua, a farmer over 70 years old. It has an area of 10 rai (3.95 acres), adjacent to Khlong Bang Ranok, a branch of the Khlong Bang Mot.
- Siamchai Dockyard (Thai: อู่สยามชัย) is the last dockyard of Khlong Bang Mot operated by a craftsman Chang Ouan. Most of the built boats are wooden boats used for local traversal.

== Population ==
Thung Khru District has four communities along the Bangmod canal.

- Moo 3 Bang mod households: 614, population: 2,261
- Moo 5 Bang mod households: 143, population: 753
- Nurulhudah Mosque households: 67, population: 413
- Dahruleibadha Mosque households: 185, population: 890

Other communities along the canal live in the Bang Khun Thian District and in developed housing. More than 10,000 people in total live near the Bangmod Canal area.
