= Nakhon Nayok River =

River in Thailand

Coordinates: 13°54′N 101°10′E

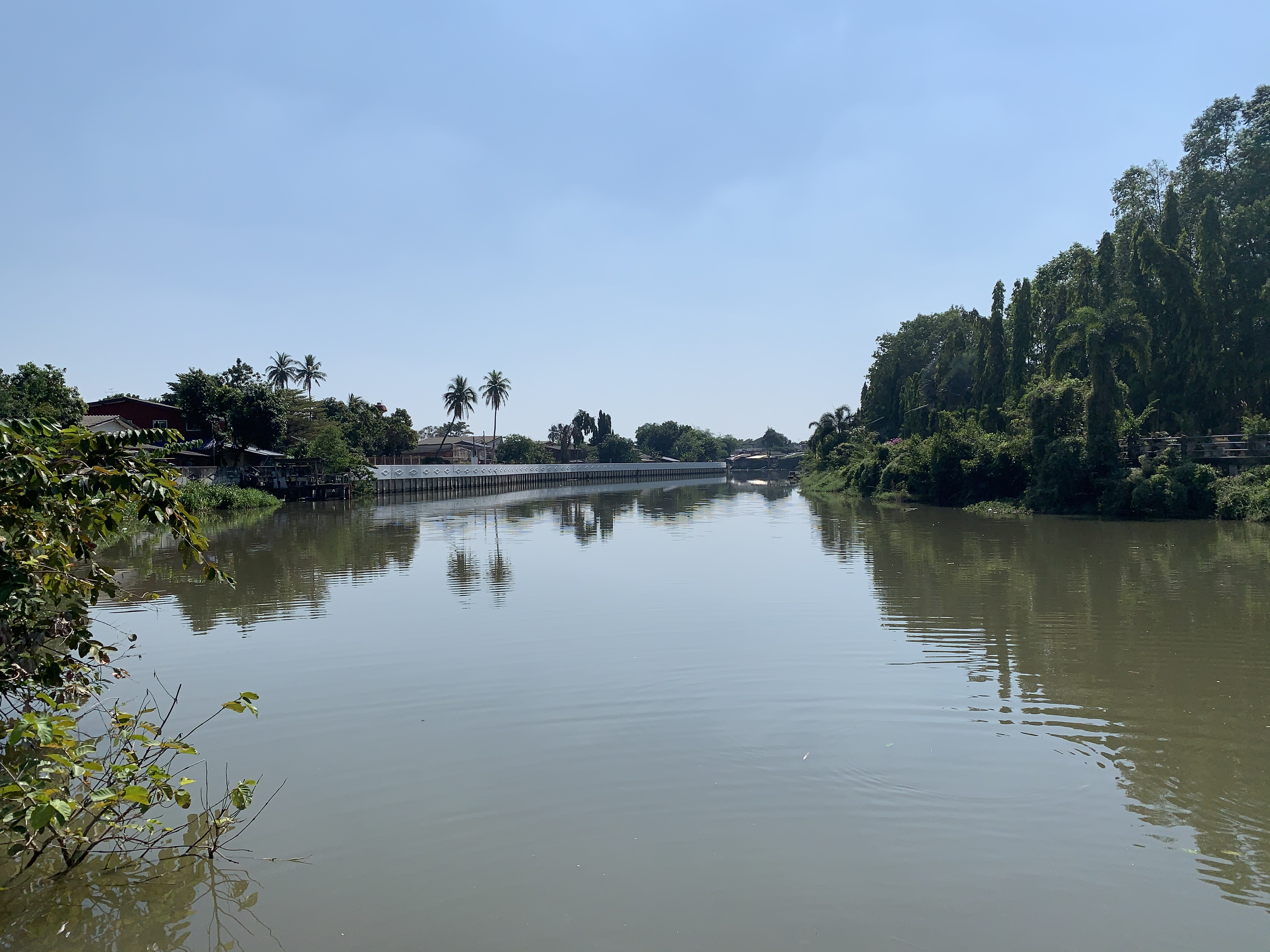
View of the Nakhon Nayok River

The Nakhon Nayok River (Thai: แม่น้ำนครนายก, RTGS: Maenam Nakhon Nayok, Thai pronunciation: [mɛ̂ːnáːm náʔkʰɔːn naːjók]) is a river in Thailand that originates in Khao Yai National Park, the country's first national park. It is a tributary of the Bang Pakong River

The Nakhon Nayok flows southwest, passing through Mueang Nakhon Nayok District, Ban Na District, and Ongkharak District of Nakhon Nayok Province. before emptying into the Bang Pakong River in Ban Sang District, Prachinburi Province at Pak Nam Yothaka. The river is 130 kilometres (81 mi) long.
