= Nakhon Nayok province =

Province of Thailand

Coordinates: 14°12′44″N 101°12′06″E

Nakhon Nayok นครนายก
- Province
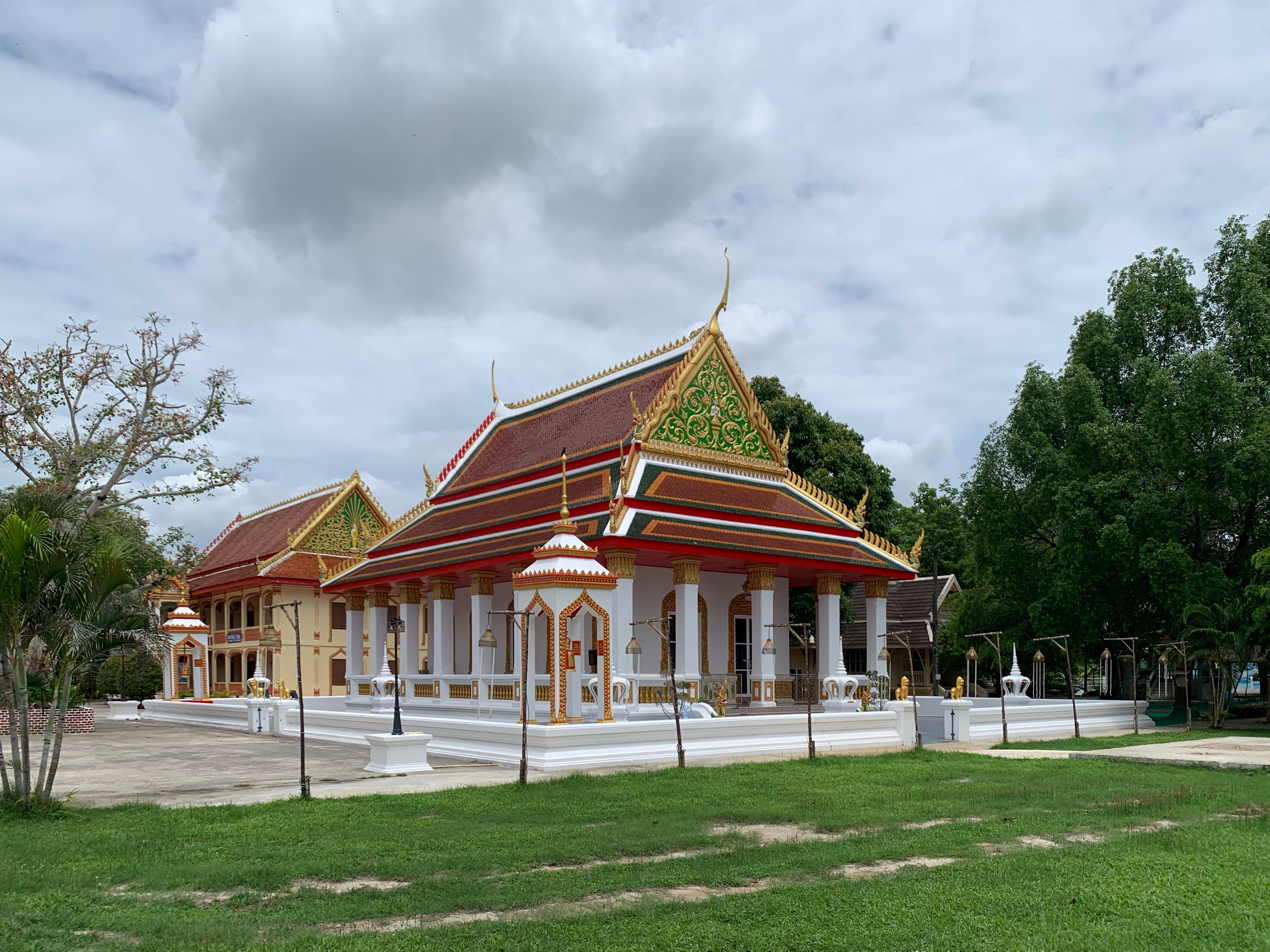
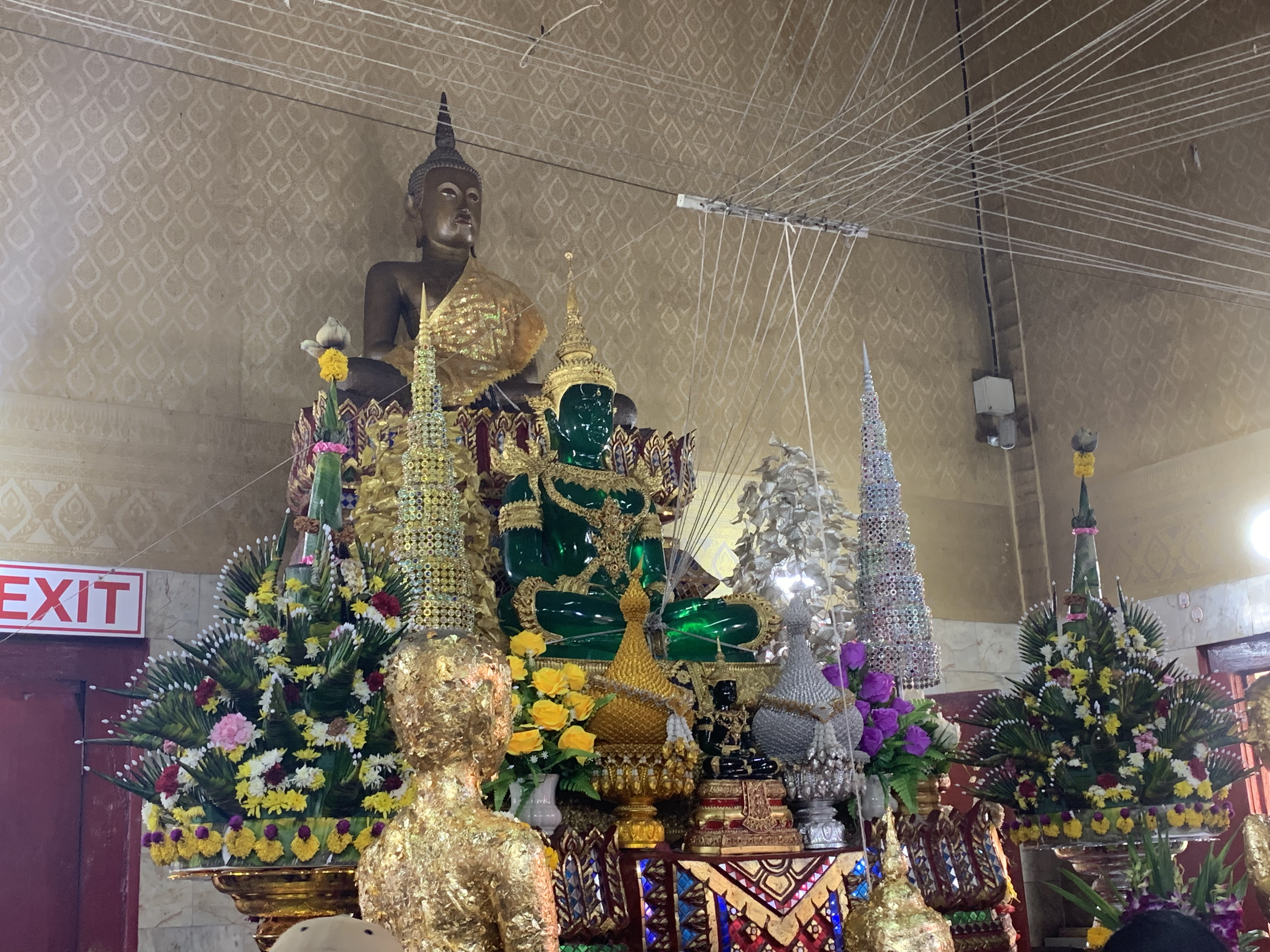
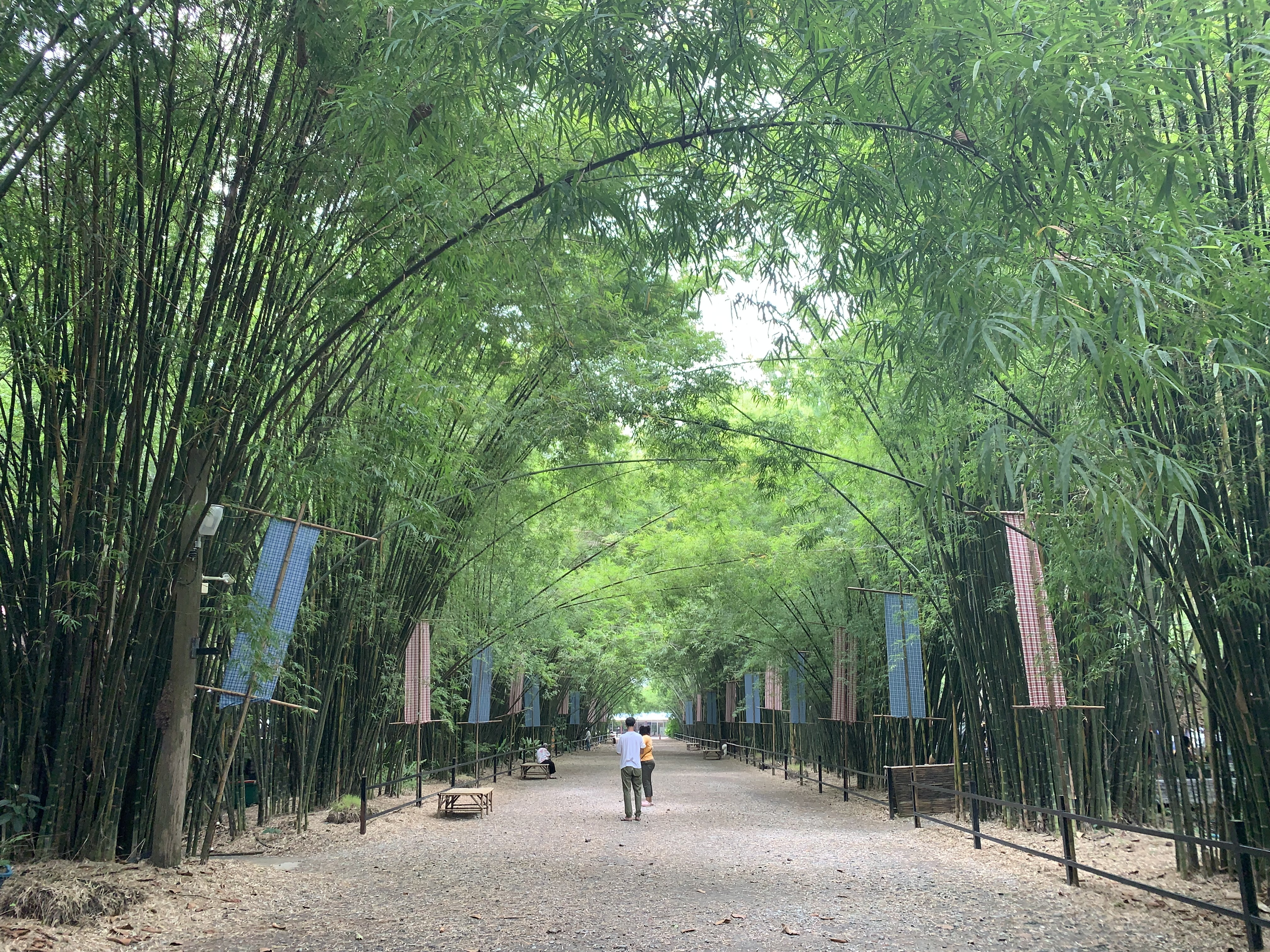
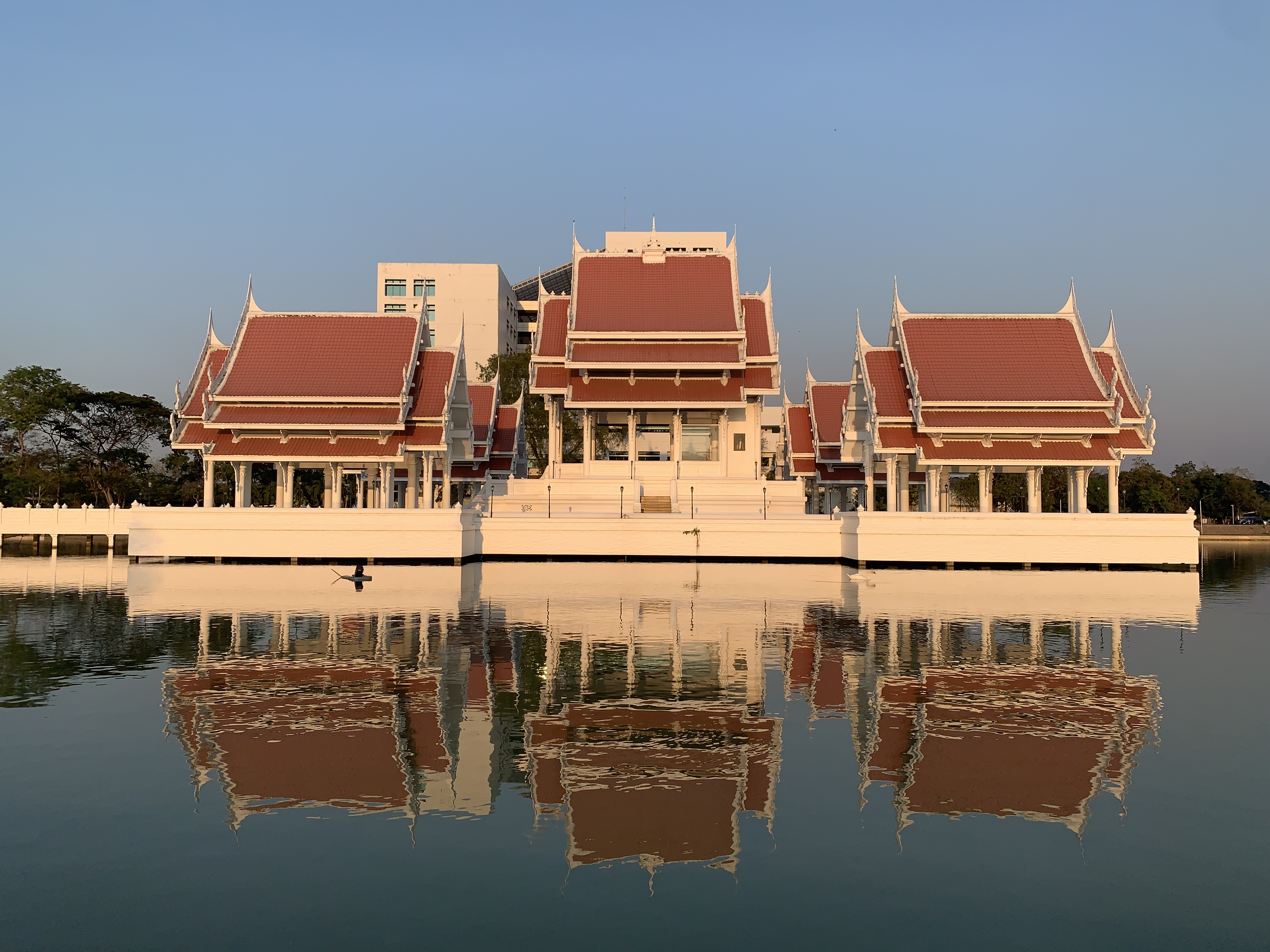
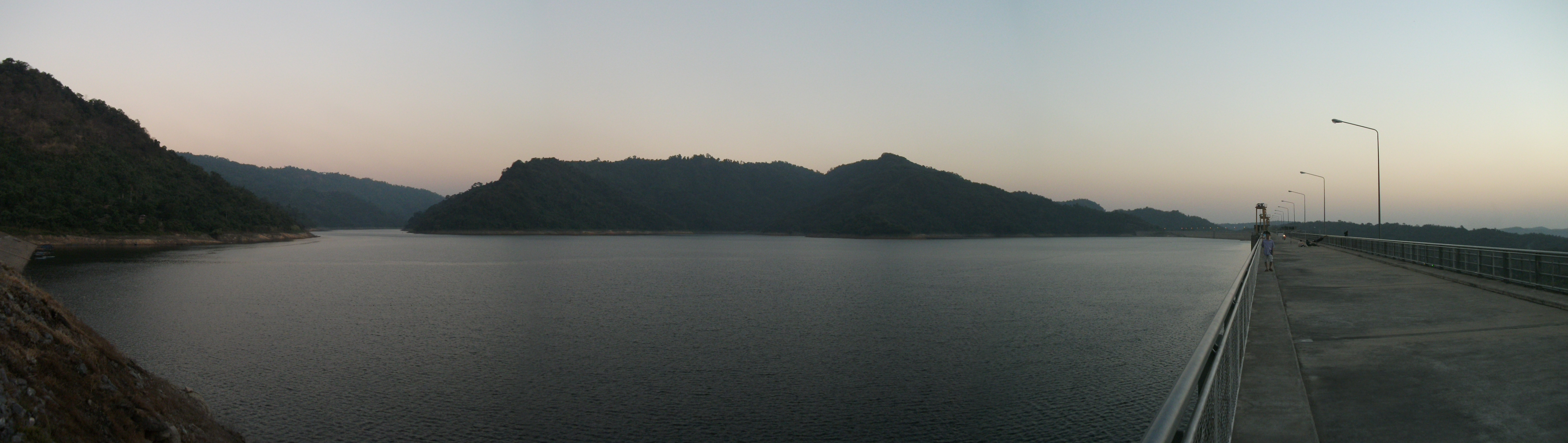
- (clockwise from upper-left): Wat Udom Thani, Luang Pho Pak Daeng Buddha at Wat Phrammani, Bamboo Forest of Wat Chulaphonwanaram, Buddharupa Shrine of Srinakharinwirot University’s Ongkharak Campus, Khun Dan Prakan Chon Dam

- Flag Seal
- Mottoes: นครนายก เมืองในฝันที่ใกล้กรุง ภูเขางาม น้ำตกสวย รวยธรรมชาติ ปราศจากมลพิษ ("Nakhon Nayok. City of dreams near the capital. Beautiful mountains. Gorgeous waterfalls. Rich in nature. Free of pollution.")
- Map of Thailand highlighting Nakhon Nayok province
- Country: Thailand
- Capital: Nakhon Nayok City

Government
  - Type: Province and Provincial Administrative Organization
  - Body: Nakhon Nayok Province and Nakhon Nayok Provincial Administrative Organization
  - Governor: Chanon Vasiksiri
  - PAO Chief Executive: Nida Yaynangam

Area
  - Total: 2,141 km^{2} (827 sq mi)
  - Rank: 67th

Population (2024)
  - Total: ▲259,770
  - Rank: 73rd
  - Density: 121/km^{2} (310/sq mi)
  - Rank: 39th

Human Achievement Index
  - HAI (2022): 0.6509 "somewhat high" Ranked 25th

GDP
  - Total: baht 27 billion (US$1.0 billion) (2019)
- Time zone: UTC+7 (ICT)
- Postal code: 26xxx
- Calling code: 037
- ISO 3166 code: TH-26
- Website: nakhonnayok.go.th

Nakhon Nayok (Thai: นครนายก, pronounced [ná(ʔ).kʰɔ̄ːn nāː.jók]) is one of the central provinces (changwat) of Thailand, established by the Act Establishing Changwat Samut Prakan, Changwat Nonthaburi, Changwat Samut Sakhon, and Changwat Nakhon Nayok, Buddhist Era 2489 (1946), which came into force on 9 May 1946.

Neighboring provinces are (from north clockwise) Saraburi, Nakhon Ratchasima, Prachinburi, Chachoengsao, and Pathum Thani. Nakhon Nayok is known for waterfalls and fruit varieties.

Nakon Nayok is a nearby province to Bangkok and has various tourist attractions. Khao Yai National Park, Thailands oldest national park is in partly in Nakhon Nayok province and attracts many tourists. Khun Dan Prakarn Chon Dam is another tourist attraction 2 hours outside of Bangkok in Nakhon Nayok.

== Toponymy ==
The word nakhon originates from the Sanskrit word nagara (Devanagari: नगर) meaning 'city', and the word nayok is thought to have been derived from the Sanskrit nāyaka (Devanagari: नायक) meaning 'leader' or 'captain'. However, in this connection, na means '[tax of] rice field' and yok means 'exempted'. Hence the name of the province literally means 'tax-free city'.

== History ==
The city of Nakhon Nayok dates back to the Dvaravati period. Ruins from this time are visible at Mueang Boran Dong Lakhon south of the modern city. A Nan'an bowl and a cover box of the Northern Song have been recorded there. Natthapong Matsong, who lists them, conjectures that wares of that period reached Dvaravati towns as goods of an elite. Patcharaporn Ngernkerd and colleagues place that site on a former shoreline of the Gulf of Thailand and hold it to have been occupied since at least the sixth century, well before the date given above. In their survey of fifteen moated sites of eastern Thailand it is a village, the smallest of three ranks, measuring 0.38 km² within its moat. A group of Buddhist buildings stands at its outer moat, and a Pali inscription carrying the ye dhammā formula has been recovered there.

Originally named Mueang Lablae, the name "Nakhon Nayok" was assigned to it in 1350, when it became a garrison town of the Ayutthaya kingdom protecting the eastern boundary. On 1 January 1943 the government downgraded Nakhon Nayok province and combined it with Prachinburi province, except for Ban Na district which became part of Saraburi province. On 9 May 1946 the province was re-established.

== Symbols ==
The provincial seal shows an elephant holding an ear of rice with its trunk. This symbolizes fertile rice fields, as well as the forests with numerous elephants. In the background two piles of straw, trees, and clouds symbolizing the natural beauty of the province.

The provincial tree and flower is the silk cotton tree (Cochlospermum religiosum). The provincial aquatic life is the red tailed tinfoil (Barbonymus altus).

== Climate ==
Nakhon Nayok province has a tropical savanna climate (Köppen climate classification category Aw). Winters are dry and warm. Temperatures rise until May. Monsoon season runs from May through October, with heavy rain and somewhat cooler temperatures during the day, although nights remain warm. Climate statistics: maximum temperature is 42.2 °C (108 °F) in April and lowest temperature is 12.2 °C (54 °F) in December. Highest average temperature is 36.8 °C (98.2 °F) in April and minimum average temperature is 20.5 °C (68.9 °F) in December. Average annual rainfall is 1,823 millimeters in 134 days. Maximum daily rainfall is 195 millimeters in August.

== Geography ==
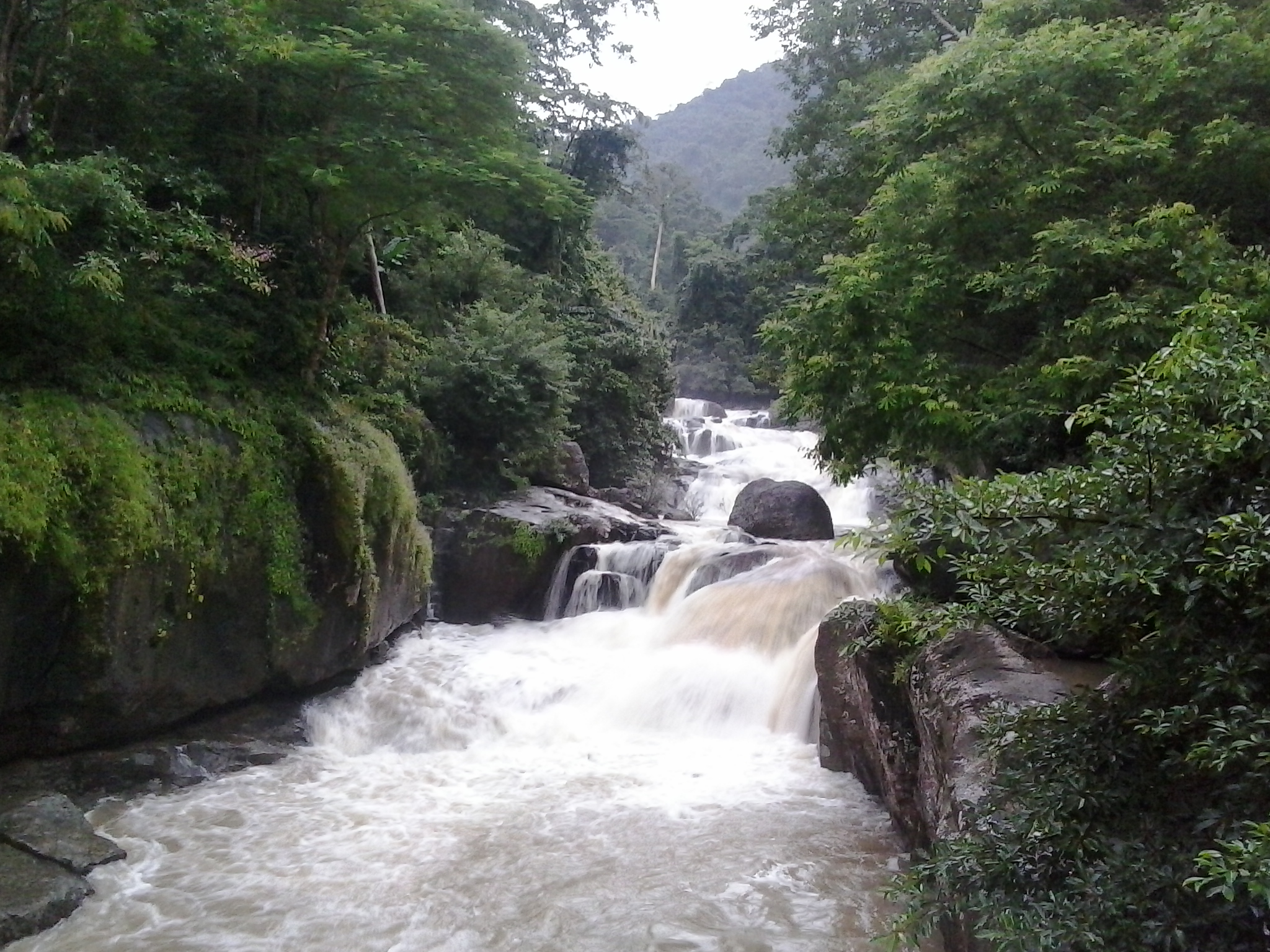
Nang Rong Waterfall is a natural attraction in Nakhon Nayok.

The northern part of the province is in the Sankamphaeng Range, the southern prolongation of the Dong Phaya Yen Mountains, with the highest elevation the 1,292-meter-high Yod Khao Kiew. Most of that area is covered by the Khao Yai National Park, 2,166 km^{2} (836 sq mi), along with three other national parks, make up region 1 (Prachinburi) of Thailand's protected areas. The central part of Nakhon Nayok province consists of a flat river plain shaped by the Nakhon Nayok River, while the southern part features relatively infertile acidic soil. The province has a total forest area of 642 km² (248 sq mi), accounting for 30 percent of its total area.

The main river of the province is the Nakhon Nayok River. It joins the Prachinburi River at Pak Nam Yothaka in Ban Sang district, Prachinburi province, which then becomes the Bang Pa Kong River.

== Administrative divisions ==
Districts of Nakhon Nayok

=== Central government ===
The province is divided into four districts (amphoes). The districts are further divided into 41 subdistricts (tambons) and 403 villages (mubans).

1. Mueang Nakhon Nayok
2. Pak Phli
3. Ban Na
4. Ongkharak

=== Local government ===
As of 26 November 2019 there are: one Nakhon Nayok Provincial Administration Organisation (ongkan borihan suan changwat) and 6 municipal (thesaban) areas in the province. Nakhon Nayok has town (thesaban mueang) status. Further 5 subdistrict municipalities (thesaban tambon). The non-municipal areas are administered by 39 Subdistrict Administrative Organisations - SAO (ongkan borihan suan tambon).

== Healthcare ==
=== Hospitals ===
There are six hospitals in the province:

- Nakhon Nayok general hospital with 314 beds.
- Chulachomklao Royal Military Academy Hospital with 90 beds.
- Pak Phli community hospital with 10 beds.
- Ban Na community hospital with 70 beds.
- Ongkharak community hospital with 31 beds.
- HRH Princess Maha Chakri Sirindhorn Medical Center with 500 beds.

=== Health promoting hospitals ===
There are total fifty-five health-promoting hospitals in the province, of which;

- 17 in Mueang Nakhon Nayok district
- 9 in Pak Phli district
- 14 in Ban Na district
- 15 in Ongkharak district.

== Demographics ==
=== Population ===
Population history of Nakhon Nayok province is as follows:

1947	1960	1970	1980	1990	2000	2011	2020
117,547	154,000	161,000	201,230	228,981	241,081	253,831	260,081

== Religion ==
There are 222 Theravada Buddhist temples in the province.

- 95 in Mueang Nakhon Nayok district
- 39 in Pak Phli district
- 55 in Ban Na district
- 33 in Ongkharak district

== Human achievement index 2022 ==
Health	Education	Employment	Income
64	3	42	35
Housing	Family	Transport	Participation
36	70	44	16
Province Nakhon Nayok, with an HAI 2022 value of 0.6509 is "somewhat high", occupies place 25 in the ranking.

Since 2003, United Nations Development Programme (UNDP) in Thailand has tracked progress on human development at sub-national level using the Human achievement index (HAI), a composite index covering all the eight key areas of human development. National Economic and Social Development Board (NESDB) has taken over this task since 2017.

Rank	Classification
1–13	"High"
14–29	"Somewhat high"
30–45	"Average"
46–61	"Somewhat low"
62–77	"Low"

Map with provinces and HAI 2022 rankings
