= Nong Sida =

Nong Sida หนองสีดา
- Tambon
- Interactive map of Nong Sida
- Coordinates: 14°30′46″N 100°49′45″E
- Country: Thailand
- Province: Saraburi
- Amphoe: Nong Saeng

Population (2019)
  - Total: 963
- Time zone: UTC+7 (TST)
- Postal code: 18170
- TIS 1099: 190504

Nong Sida (Thai: หนองสีดา) is a tambon (subdistrict) of Nong Saeng District, in Saraburi Province, Thailand. In 2019 it had a total population of 963 people.

== Administration ==
=== Central administration ===
The tambon is subdivided into 6 administrative villages (muban).

No.	Name	Thai
1.	Ban Khok Wua	บ้านโคกวัว
2.	Ban Khok	บ้านโคก
3.	Ban Kham	บ้านขาม
4.	Ban Nong Sida	บ้านหนองสีดา
5.	Ban Nong Sida	บ้านหนองสีดา
6.	Ban Don	บ้านโดน

=== Local administration ===
The whole area of the subdistrict is covered by the subdistrict administrative organization (SAO) Nong Hua Pho (องค์การบริหารส่วนตำบลหนองหัวโพ).
