= Tha Sawang subdistrict =

Coordinates: 14°57′54″N 103°27′9″E

Tha Sawang ท่าสว่าง
- Subdistrict
- Interactive map of Tha Sawang
- Country: Thailand
- Province: Surin
- District: Mueang Surin District

Area
  - Total: 73.418 km^{2} (28.347 sq mi)

Population (2006)
  - Total: 16,642
  - Density: 226.67/km^{2} (587.08/sq mi)
- Time zone: UTC+7 (ICT)
- Postal Code: 32000
- Geocode: 320105

Tha Sawang (Thai: ท่าสว่าง, pronounced [tʰâː sā.wàːŋ]) is a subdistrict (tambon) of Mueang Surin District, Surin Province, northeastern Thailand.

== Geography ==
Neighboring subdistricts are (from the north clockwise) Na Di, Kae Yai, Nok Mueang and Kho Kho of Mueang Surin, Surin Province and Nong Teng, Chumsaeng, and Lamduan of Krasang District, Buriram Province.

== Economy ==
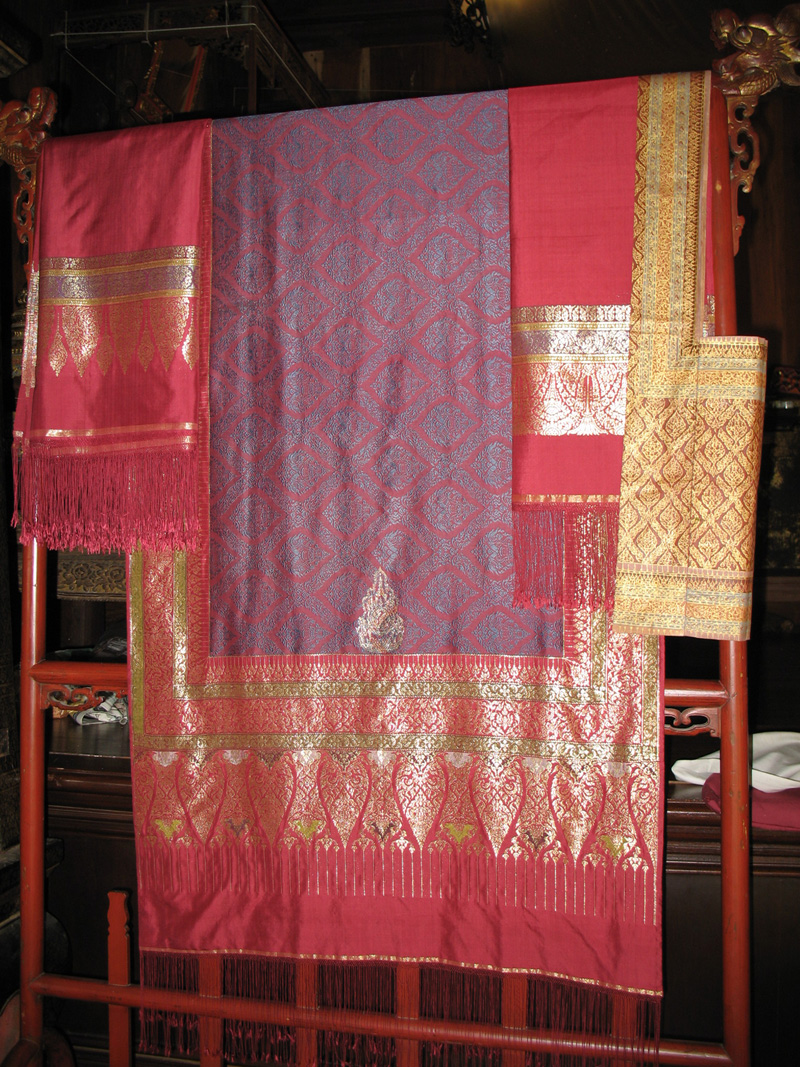
Silks, Tha Sawang

Agriculture is the main activity of the sub-district, with rice and vegetables as the main products. The second job of the people in the area is silk weaving. The brocade/silk from this sub-district was selected as the official souvenir of the APEC Summit 2003 in Bangkok.

== Administration ==
The tambon is administered by a tambon administrative organization (TAO). It is divided into 20 villages (mubans).

1.	Tha Sawang	ท่าสว่าง	11.	Som Poi	ส้มปอย
2.	Khwao Noi	เขวาน้อย	12.	Ra Phao	ระเภาว์
3.	Samrong	สำโรง	13.	A Mong	อาม็อง
4.	Khok Phet	โคกเพชร	14.	Cha Kae Sae Rong	จะแกแสรง
5.	Cha Kae Kon	จะแกโกน	15.	Khok Cha	โคกจ๊ะ
6.	Ang Kan	อังกัญ	16.	Sala	ศาลา
7.	La O	ละเอาะ	17.	Ka Phoe Sa Kom	กะเพอสะโกม
8.	Ka Ko	กาเกาะ	18.	Ka Phoe Sa Kom	โคกสวาย
9.	Ta Baen	ตาแบน	19.	Khok Ma Ka	โคกมะกะ
10.	Rayong	ระโยง	20.	Nong Prue	หนองปรือ

== Gallery ==
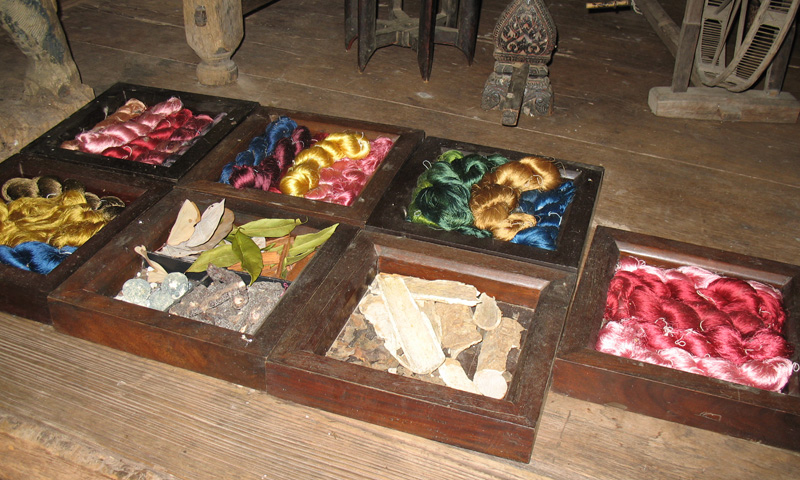

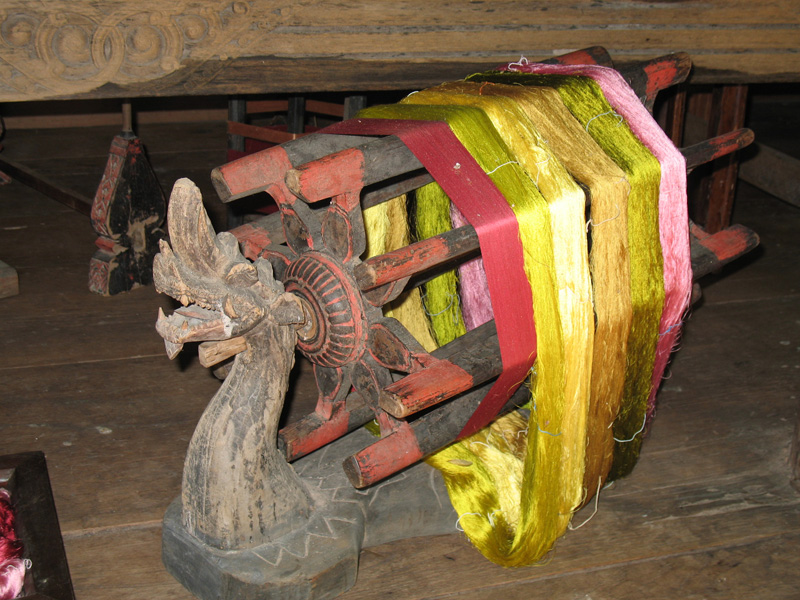

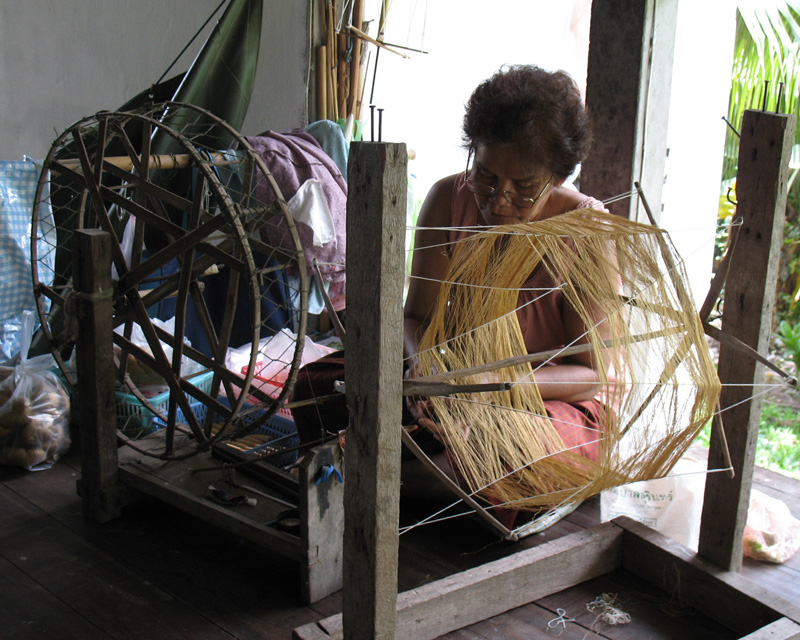

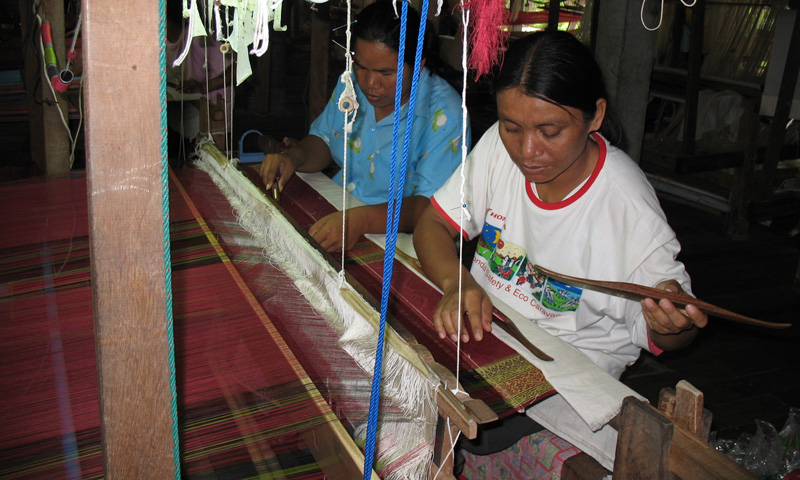

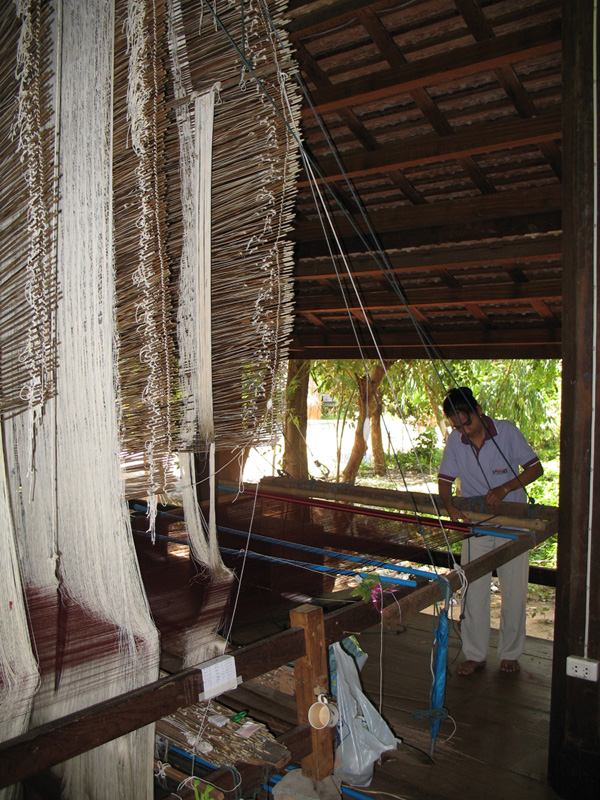

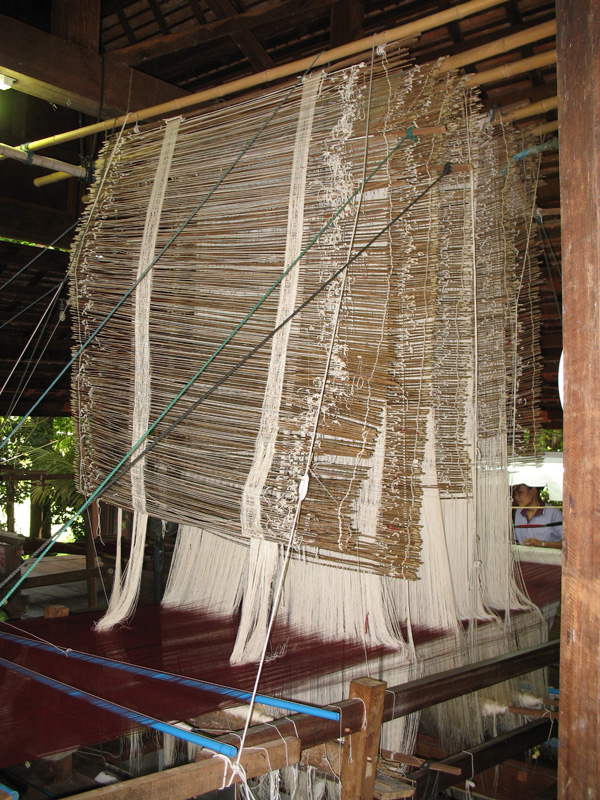

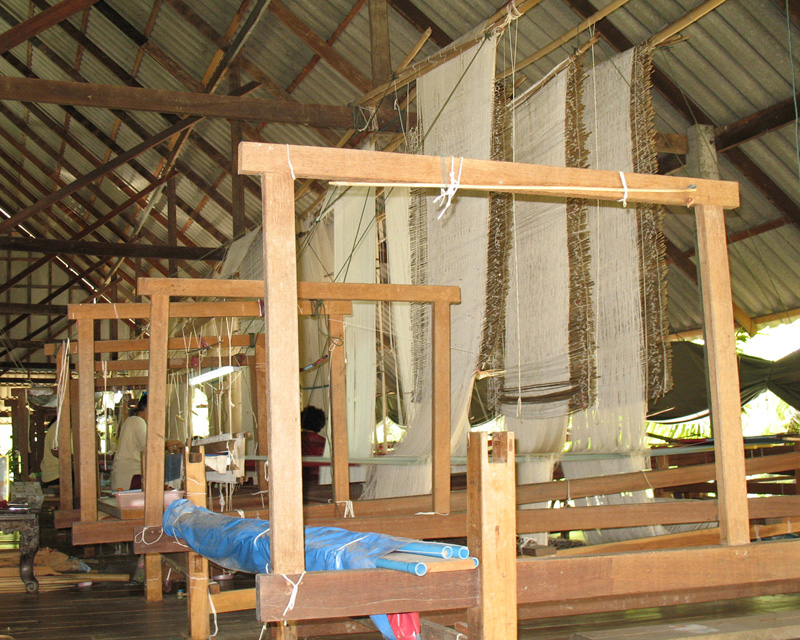

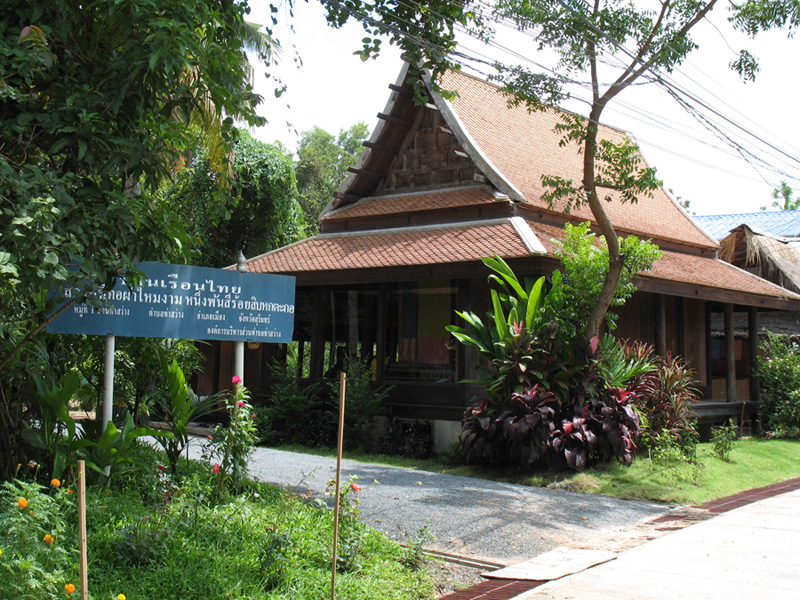
