= Krasang railway station =

Railway station in Thailand

Krasang กระสัง
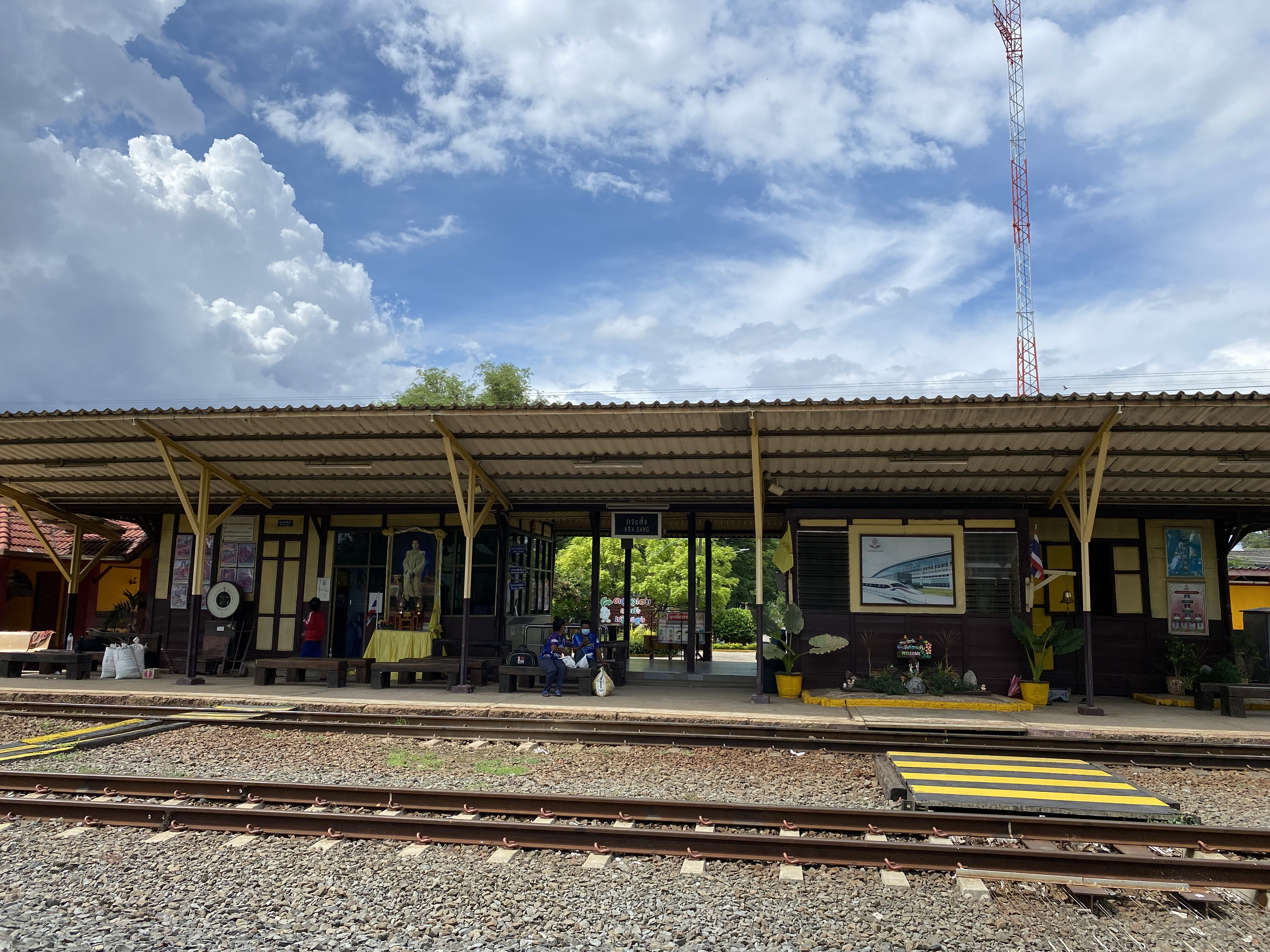

General information
- Location: Krasang Subdistrict, Krasang District, Buriram Province
- Coordinates: 14°55′37″N 103°18′10″E
- Owner: State Railway of Thailand
- Line: Northeastern Line
- Platforms: 1
- Tracks: 3

Other information
- Station code: ะส.

Services
Preceding station	State Railway of Thailand	Following station
Huai Rat towards Hua Lamphong or Krung Thep Aphiwat	Northeastern Line	Nong Teng towards Ubon Ratchathani
Location

Krasang railway station is a railway station located in Krasang Subdistrict, Krasang District, Buriram Province. It is a class 2 railway station located 398.65 km (247.7 mi) from Bangkok railway station and is the main station for Krasang District.
