= Huai Rat railway station =

Railway station in Thailand

Huai Rat ห้วยราช
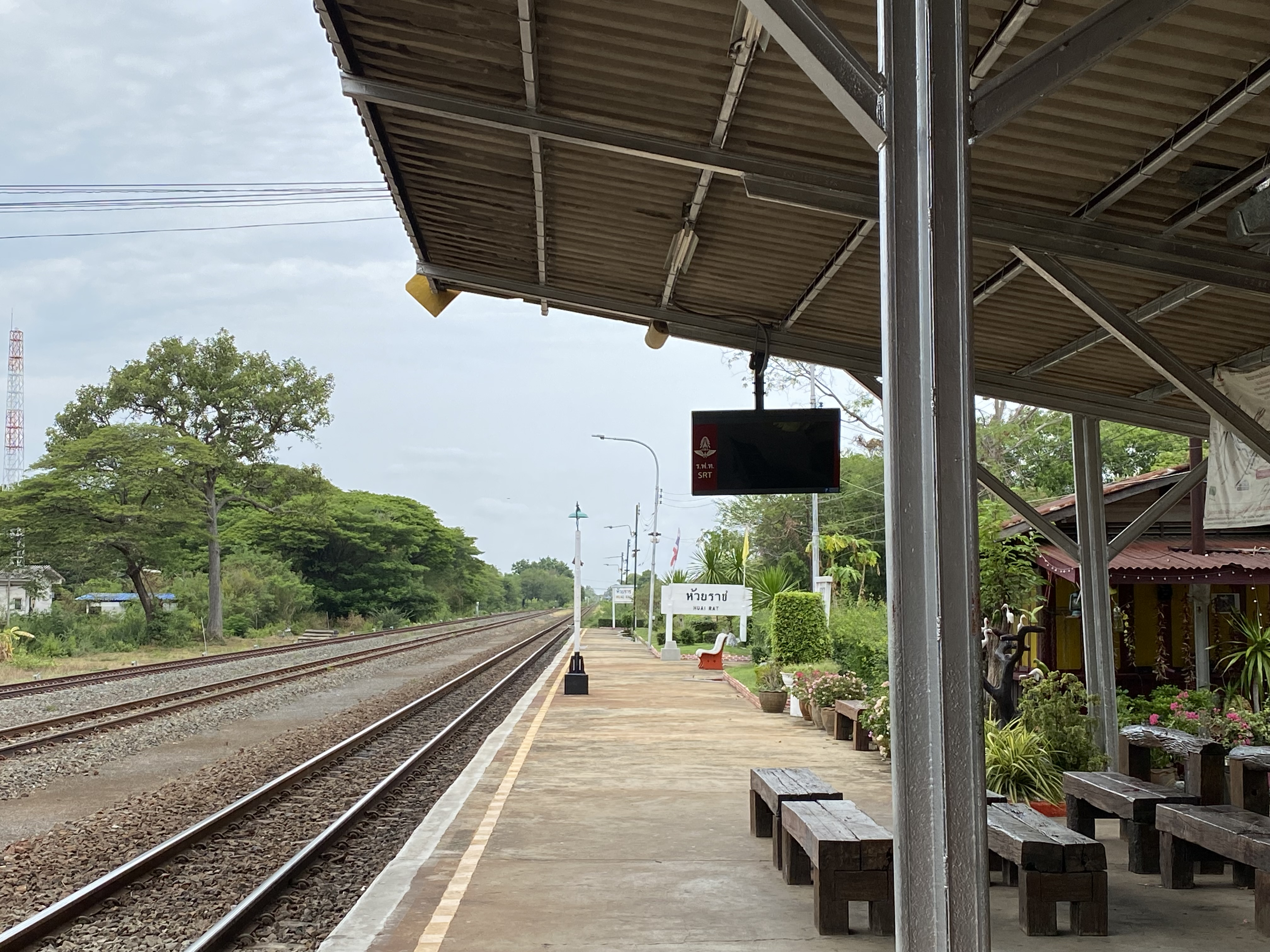

General information
- Location: Huai Racha Subdistrict, Huai Rat District; Buriram Province; Thailand
- Coordinates: 14°58′22″N 103°11′24″E
- Operator: State Railway of Thailand
- Manager: Ministry of Transport
- Line: Ubon Ratchathani Main Line
- Platforms: 1
- Tracks: 3

Construction
- Structure type: At-grade

Other information
- Station code: หร.
- Classification: Class 2

Services
Preceding station	State Railway of Thailand	Following station
Ban Tako Halt towards Hua Lamphong or Krung Thep Aphiwat	Northeastern Line	Krasang towards Ubon Ratchathani
Location

Huai Rat railway station is a railway station located in Huai Racha Subdistrict, Huai Rat District, Buriram Province. It is a class 2 railway station located 385.51 km (239.5 mi) from Bangkok railway station and is the main station for Huai Rat District.
