= Isan (town) =

Isan อิสาณ
- Subdistrict
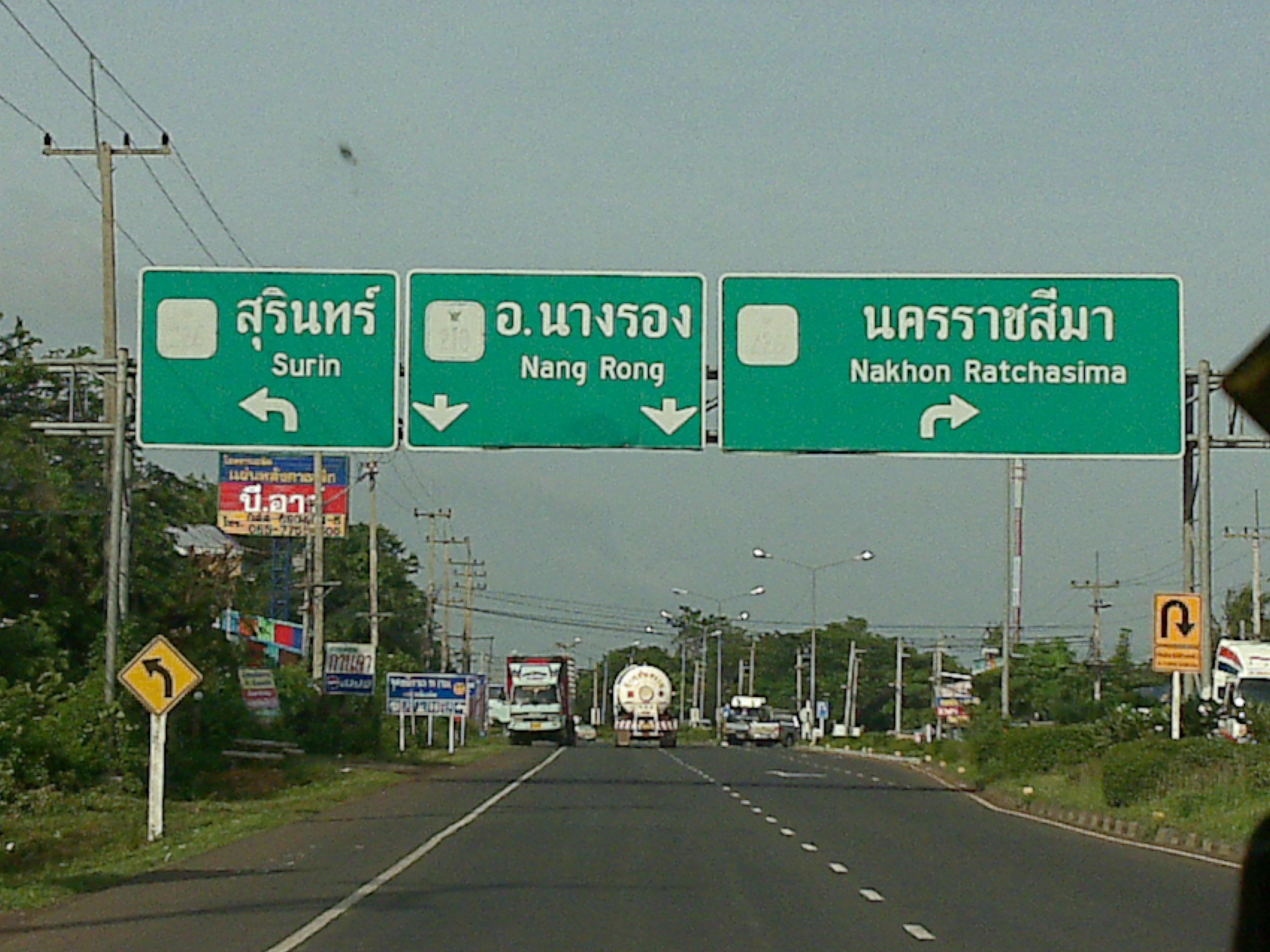
- Road in Isan

- Location in Thailand
- Coordinates: 14°59′39″N 103°06′08″E
- Country: Thailand
- Province: Buriram
- District: Mueang Buriram
- Tambon: Tambon Isan

Area
  - Total: 14.247 sq mi (36.899 km^{2})
- Elevation: 535 ft (163 m)

Population (2011)
  - Total: 17,116
  - Density: 1,201.4/sq mi (463.86/km^{2})
- Time zone: UTC+7 (Thailand Standard Time)
- Postal code: 31000
- Area code: 044

Isan (Thai: อิสาณ) is a subdistricts (tambon) of Mueang Buriram District, in Buriram Province, Thailand. About 409 km north-east of Bangkok. The whole area of the subdistrict is covered by Buriram City Municipality (เทศบาลนครบุรีรัมย์).

== See also ==
- Buriram
- Buriram Province
- Amphoe Mueang Buriram
