= Satuek district =

Satuek สตึก
- District
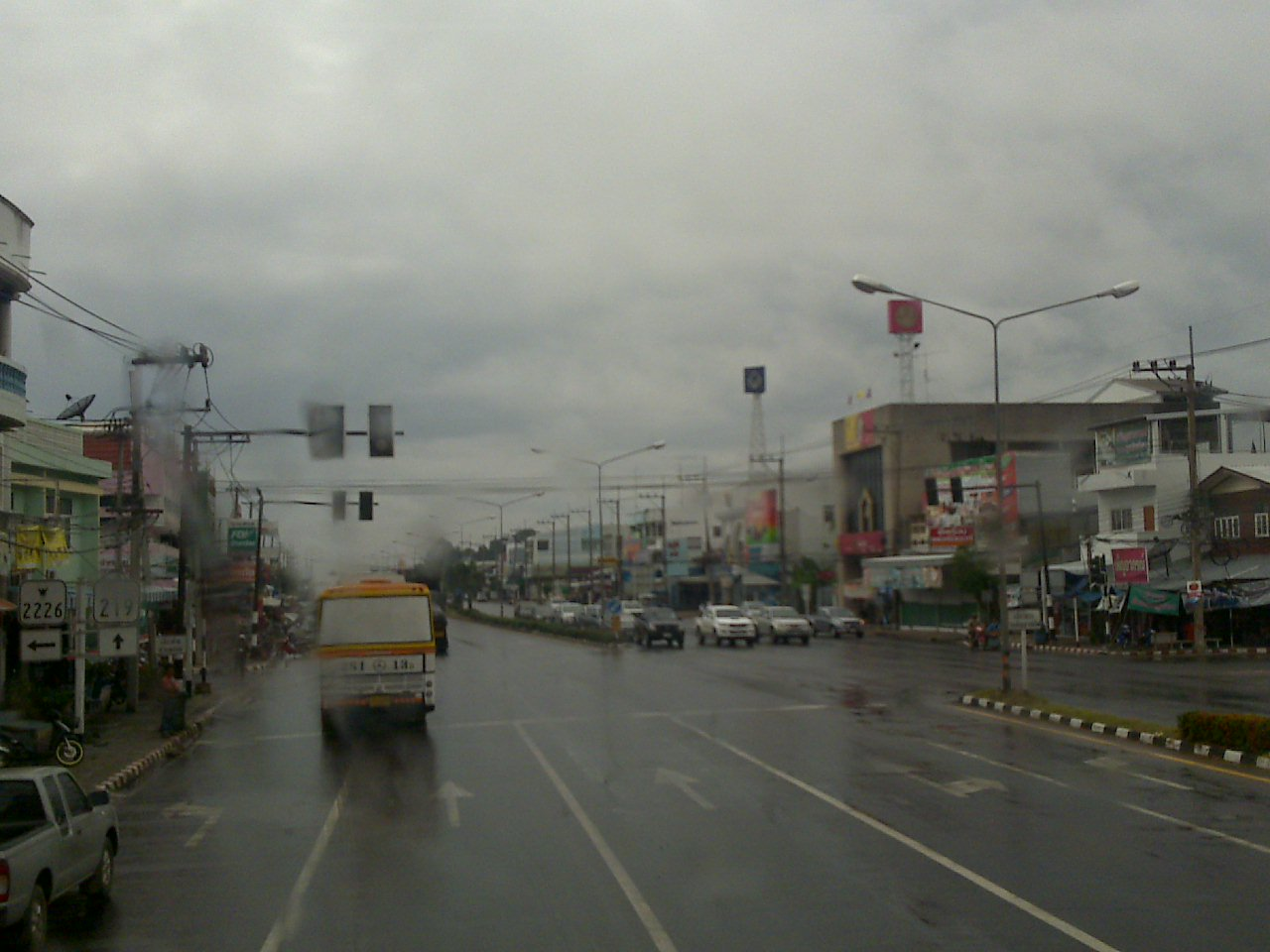
- National Hwy 219 in Satuek District

- District location in Buriram province
- Coordinates: 15°17′51″N 103°17′31″E
- Country: Thailand
- Province: Buriram

Area
  - Total: 803.0 km^{2} (310.0 sq mi)

Population (2005)
  - Total: 109,221
  - Density: 136/km^{2} (350/sq mi)
- Time zone: UTC+7 (ICT)
- Postal code: 31150
- Geocode: 3111

Satuek (Thai: สตึก, pronounced [sā.tɯ̀k]; Northeastern Thai: สตึก, pronounced [sā.tɯ̌k]) is a district (amphoe) in the northeastern part of Buriram province, northeastern Thailand.

== Geography ==
Neighbouring districts are (from the south clockwise) Krasang, Huai Rat, Ban Dan, Khu Mueang, Khaen Dong of Buriram Province, Chumphon Buri, Tha Tum, Chom Phra, and Mueang Surin district of Surin province.

== History ==
Originally a tambon of Mueang Buriram district, the minor district (king amphoe) Satuek was created in 1938. It was upgraded to a full district on 1 November 1947.

Satuek district, located in Buriram Province, is bordered by several neighboring districts including Krasang, Huai Rat, Ban Dan, Khu Mueang, and Khaen Dong, as well as Chumphon Buri, Tha Tum, Chom Phra, and Mueang Surin from Surin Province.

The area was initially part of Mueang Buriram before being separated and developed into its own district. Over time, Satuek grew in administrative significance and was officially recognized as a full district in 1947.

== Administration ==
The district is divided into 12 sub-districts (tambons), which are further subdivided into 190 villages (mubans). Satuek is a township (thesaban tambon) which covers parts of tambons Satuek and Nikhom. There are a further 12 tambon administrative organizations (TAO).

No.	Name	Thai name	Villages	Pop.
1.	Satuek	สตึก	25	11,481
2.	Nikhom	นิคม	24	16,322
3.	Thung Wang	ทุ่งวัง	15	8,480
4.	Mueang Kae	เมืองแก	19	11,517
5.	Nong Yai	หนองใหญ่	16	9,153
6.	Ron Thong	ร่อนทอง	18	11,839
9.	Don Mon	ดอนมนต์	10	5,609
10.	Chum Saeng	ชุมแสง	18	10,175
11.	Tha Muang	ท่าม่วง	12	6,375
12.	Sakae	สะแก	13	7,170
14.	Sanam Chai	สนามชัย	12	6,469
15.	Krasang	กระสัง	8	4,631

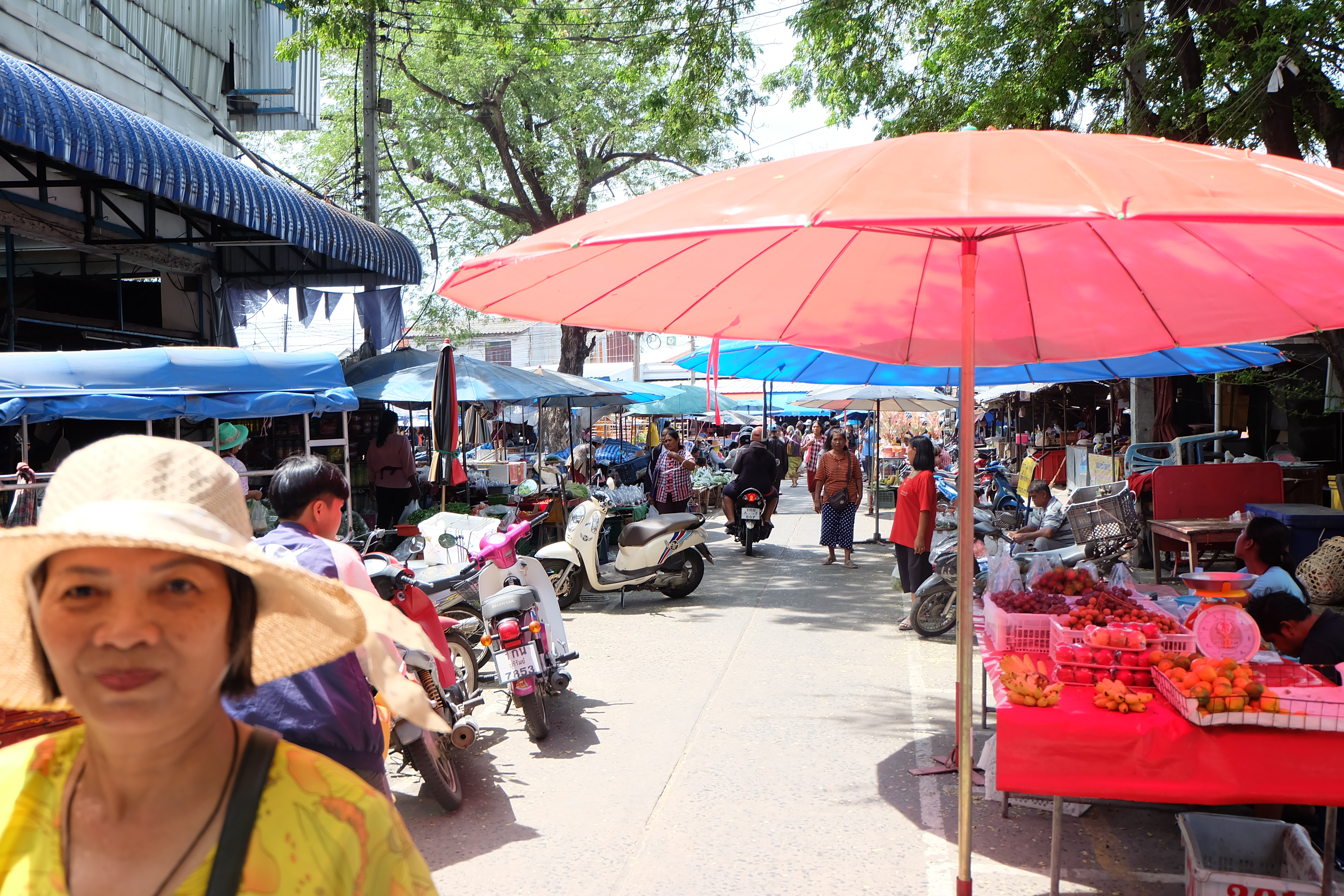
Satuek market

Missing numbers are tambon which now form Khaen Dong District.
