= Chumphon Buri district =

Chumphon Buri ชุมพลบุรี
- District
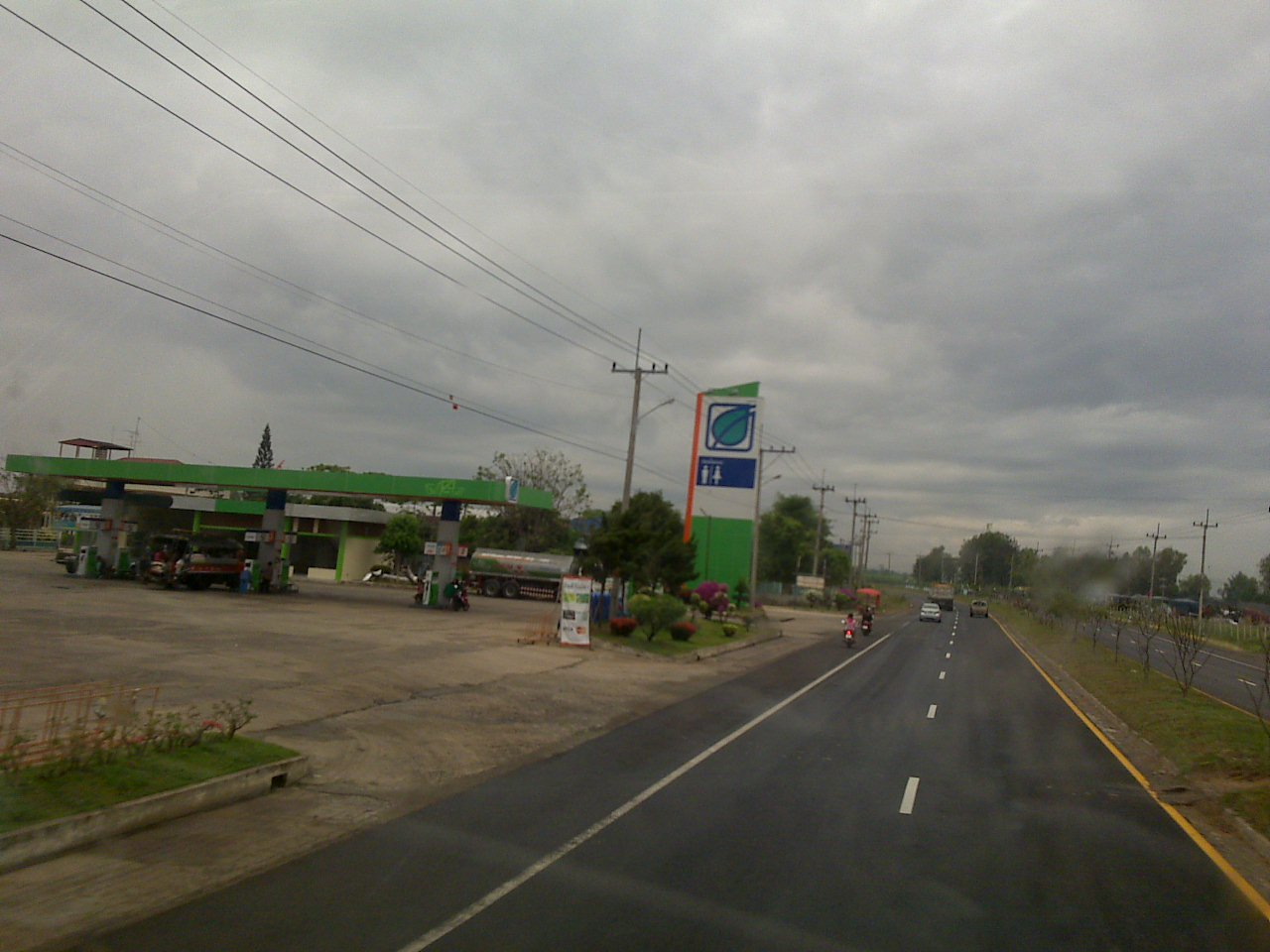
- Rural road in Chumphon Buri in 2012

- District location in Surin province
- Coordinates: 15°21′3″N 103°23′20″E
- Country: Thailand
- Province: Surin
- Seat: Chumphon Buri

Area
  - Total: 520.3 km^{2} (200.9 sq mi)

Population (2005)
  - Total: 70,391
  - Density: 135.4/km^{2} (351/sq mi)
- Time zone: UTC+7 (ICT)
- Postal code: 32190
- Geocode: 3202

Chumphon Buri (Thai: ชุมพลบุรี, pronounced [t͡ɕʰūm.pʰōn bū.rīː]) is a district (amphoe) in the northwestern part of Surin province, northeastern Thailand.

== History ==
The district dates back to Mueang Chumphon Buri, which was converted into a district during the thesaphiban administrative reform c. 1900.

On 22 February 1938 the eastern part of the district was split off to form Tha Tum district. The remaining district was considered to be too small to be a full district and was thus reduced to a minor district (king amphoe) on 4 March 1938. On 20 February 1953 it regained full district status.

== Geography ==
Neighboring districts are (from the north clockwise): Phayakkhaphum Phisai of Maha Sarakham province; Kaset Wisai of Roi Et province; Tha Tum of Surin Province; and Satuek, Khaen Dong, Khu Mueang and Phutthaisong of Buriram province.

== Administration ==
The district is divided into nine sub-districts (tambons), which are further subdivided into 122 villages (mubans). Chumphon Buri is a township (thesaban tambon) and covers parts of tambon Chumphon Buri. There are a further nine tambon administrative organizations (TAO).

| No. | Name | Thai name | Villages | Pop. |
|---|---|---|---|---|
| 1. | Chumphon Buri | ชุมพลบุรี | 22 | 12868 |
| 2. | Na Nong Phai | นาหนองไผ่ | 19 | 8964 |
| 3. | Phrai Khla | ไพรขลา | 10 | 6827 |
| 4. | Si Narong | ศรีณรงค์ | 13 | 7496 |
| 5. | Yawuek | ยะวึก | 10 | 7478 |
| 6. | Mueang Bua | เมืองบัว | 16 | 9509 |
| 7. | Sa Khut | สระขุด | 12 | 6515 |
| 8. | Krabueang | กระเบื้อง | 10 | 5835 |
| 9. | Nong Ruea | หนองเรือ | 9 | 4899 |
