= Ban Dan district =

Ban Dan บ้านด่าน
- District
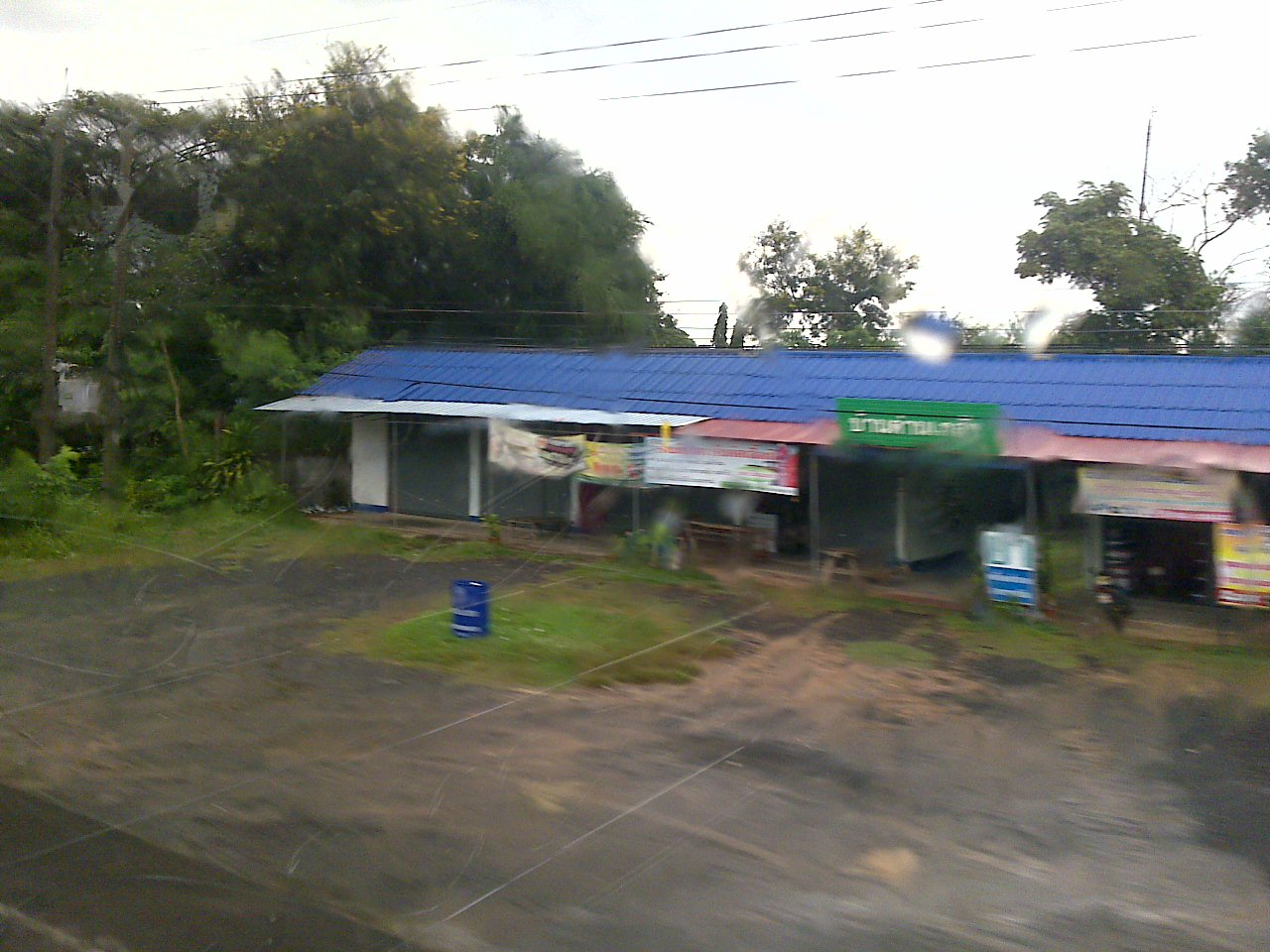

- District location in Buriram province
- Coordinates: 15°6′26″N 103°10′29″E
- Country: Thailand
- Province: Buriram
- Seat: Ban Dan

Area
  - Total: 247.6 km^{2} (95.6 sq mi)

Population (2005)
  - Total: 30,548
  - Density: 123.4/km^{2} (320/sq mi)
- Time zone: UTC+7 (ICT)
- Postal code: 31000
- Geocode: 3121

Ban Dan (Thai: บ้านด่าน, pronounced [bâːn dàːn]; Northeastern Thai: บ้านด่าน, pronounced [bâːn dáːn]) is a district (amphoe) of Buriram province, northeastern Thailand.

== History ==
The minor district (king amphoe) Ban Dan was created on 15 July 1996 by splitting four tambons from Mueang Buriram district.

On 15 May 2007, all 81 minor districts were upgraded to full districts. With publication in the Royal Gazette on 24 August the upgrade became official.

== Geography ==
Neighboring districts are (from the north clockwise) Khaen Dong, Satuek, Huai Rat, Mueang Buriram and Khu Mueang.

== Administration ==
The district is divided into four sub-districts (tambons), which are further subdivided into 59 villages (mubans). There are no municipal (thesaban) areas. There are a further four tambon administrative organizations.

| No. | Name | Thai name | Villages | Pop. |
|---|---|---|---|---|
| 1. | Ban Dan | บ้านด่าน | 20 | 11,808 |
| 2. | Prasat | ปราสาท | 18 | 8,791 |
| 3. | Wang Nuea | วังเหนือ | 12 | 4,327 |
| 4. | Non Khwang | โนนขวาง | 9 | 5,622 |
