= Nang Rong, Buriram =

Nang Rong
- Town
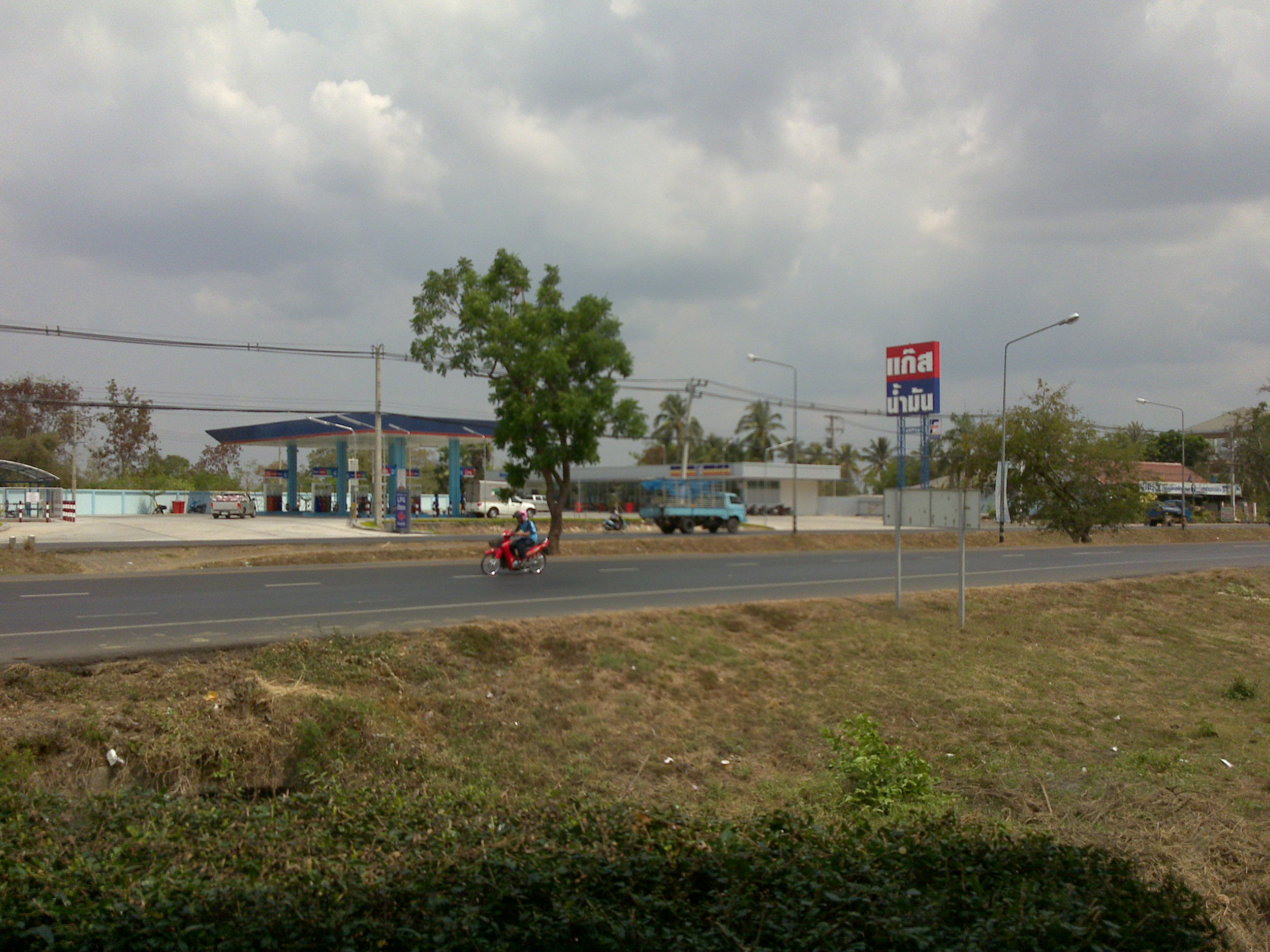
- Nang Rong

- Location in Thailand
- Coordinates: 14°37′42″N 102°47′36″E
- Country: Thailand
- Province: Buriram Province
- District: Nang Rong District

Population (2012)
  - Total: 21,257
  - Metro density: 2,650/sq mi (1,023/km^{2})

Nang Rong (Thai: นางรอง) is a town (Thesaban Mueang) of Buriram Province, in north-eastern Thailand.

== History ==
The first local government for Nang Rong was created in 1957, when it became a sanitary district (sukhaphiban). On November 8, 1986, the sanitary district was upgraded to a subdistrict municipality (thesaban tambon), and effective August 3, 2005, it became a town (thesaban mueang).

== Geography ==
Nang Rong is the central town of Nang Rong District, containing the district office and other government offices. It is the closest major town to the Phanom Rung Historical Park, an 11th-century religious site.

== Administration divisions ==
Nang Rong is subdivided into 20 boroughs (Chumchon).

1. Wat Khun Kong (ชุมชนวัดขุนก้อง)
2. Wat Klang (ชุมชนวัดกลาง)
3. War Rong Man Thet (ชุมชนวัดร่องมันเทศ)
4. Wat Pa Re Rai (ชุมชนวัดป่าเรไร)
5. Wat Pa Ta Seng (ชุมชนป่าตาเส็ง)
6. Wat Thanon Hak (ชุมชนวัดถนนหัก)
7. Ban Kao (ชุมชนบ้านเก่า)
8. Wat Mai Re Rai Thong (ชุมชนวัดใหม่เรไรทอง)
9. Nong Phrong (ชุมชนหนองโพรง)
10. Thung Laem (ชุมชนทุ่งแหลม)
11. Nong Ri (ชุมชนหนองรี)
12. Ban Nong Krat (ชุมชนบ้านหนองกราด)
13. Ban Nong Samet (ชุมชนบ้านหนองเสม็ด)
14. Ban Chabuak (ชุมชนบ้านจะบวก)
15. Khok Luang Pho (ชุมชนโคกหลวงพ่อ)
16. Ban Don Salaeng Phan (ชุมชนบ้านดอนแสลงพันธ์)
17. Ban Thanon Hak (ชุมชนบ้านถนนหัก)
18. Thanon Hak Phatthana (ชุมชนถนนหักพัฒนา)
19. Wat Suan Pa Rak Nam (ชุมชนวัดสวนป่ารักน้ำ)
20. Wat Hua Saphan (ชุมชนวัดหัวสะพาน)

== Climate ==
Climate data for Nang Rong, Buriram
Month	Jan	Feb	Mar	Apr	May	Jun	Jul	Aug	Sep	Oct	Nov	Dec	Year
Mean daily maximum °C (°F)	30.8 (87.4)	33.8 (92.8)	35.5 (95.9)	36.0 (96.8)	34.5 (94.1)	33.7 (92.7)	33.2 (91.8)	32.6 (90.7)	31.8 (89.2)	30.7 (87.3)	29.5 (85.1)	29.2 (84.6)	32.6 (90.7)
Mean daily minimum °C (°F)	17.0 (62.6)	20.1 (68.2)	22.3 (72.1)	24.1 (75.4)	24.4 (75.9)	24.4 (75.9)	24.0 (75.2)	23.8 (74.8)	23.5 (74.3)	22.8 (73.0)	20.3 (68.5)	17.2 (63.0)	22.0 (71.6)
Average precipitation mm (inches)	8.2 (0.32)	11.0 (0.43)	37.9 (1.49)	76.5 (3.01)	154.7 (6.09)	140.6 (5.54)	160.7 (6.33)	177.0 (6.97)	232.8 (9.17)	143.2 (5.64)	36.8 (1.45)	3.2 (0.13)	1,182.6 (46.57)
Source: TMD.

== Transport ==
Nang Rong is connected to Bangkok mainly by bus, with buses arriving and departing hourly during the day.

== Religion ==
Main religion of Nang Rong is Buddhism.

== See also ==
- Buriram Province
- Nang Rong District
- Muang Nang Rong
