= Huai Rat district =

Huai Rat ห้วยราช
- District
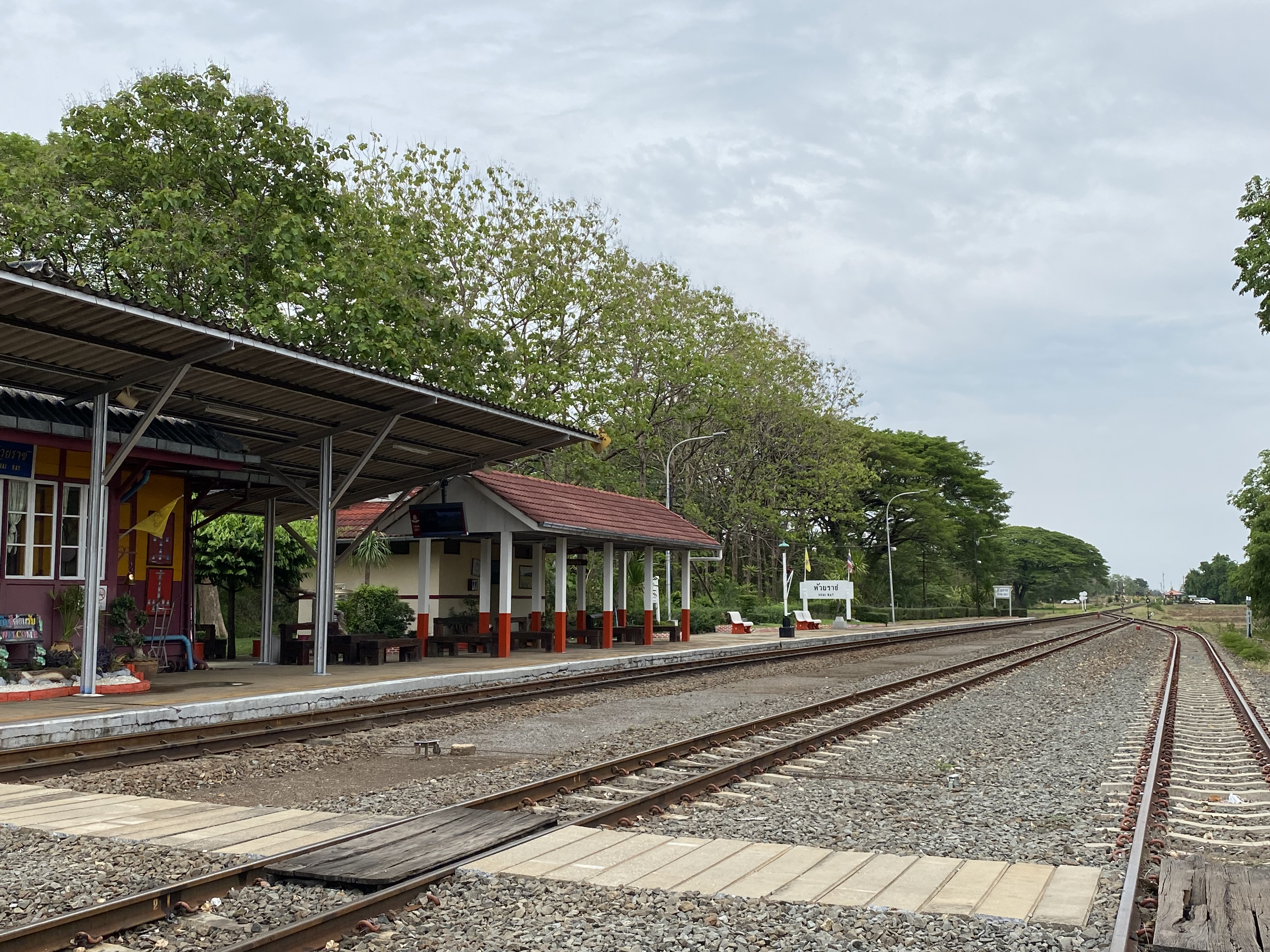
- Huai Rat railway station

- District location in Buriram province
- Coordinates: 14°57′36″N 103°11′18″E
- Country: Thailand
- Province: Buriram
- Seat: Huai Rat

Area
  - Total: 147.1 km^{2} (56.8 sq mi)

Population (2005)
  - Total: 35,941
  - Density: 244.3/km^{2} (633/sq mi)
- Time zone: UTC+7 (ICT)
- Postal code: 31000
- Geocode: 3116

Huai Rat (Thai: ห้วยราช, pronounced [hûaj râːt]; Northeastern Thai: ห้วยราช, pronounced [hùaj lâːt]) is a district (amphoe) of Buriram province, northeastern Thailand.

== Geography ==
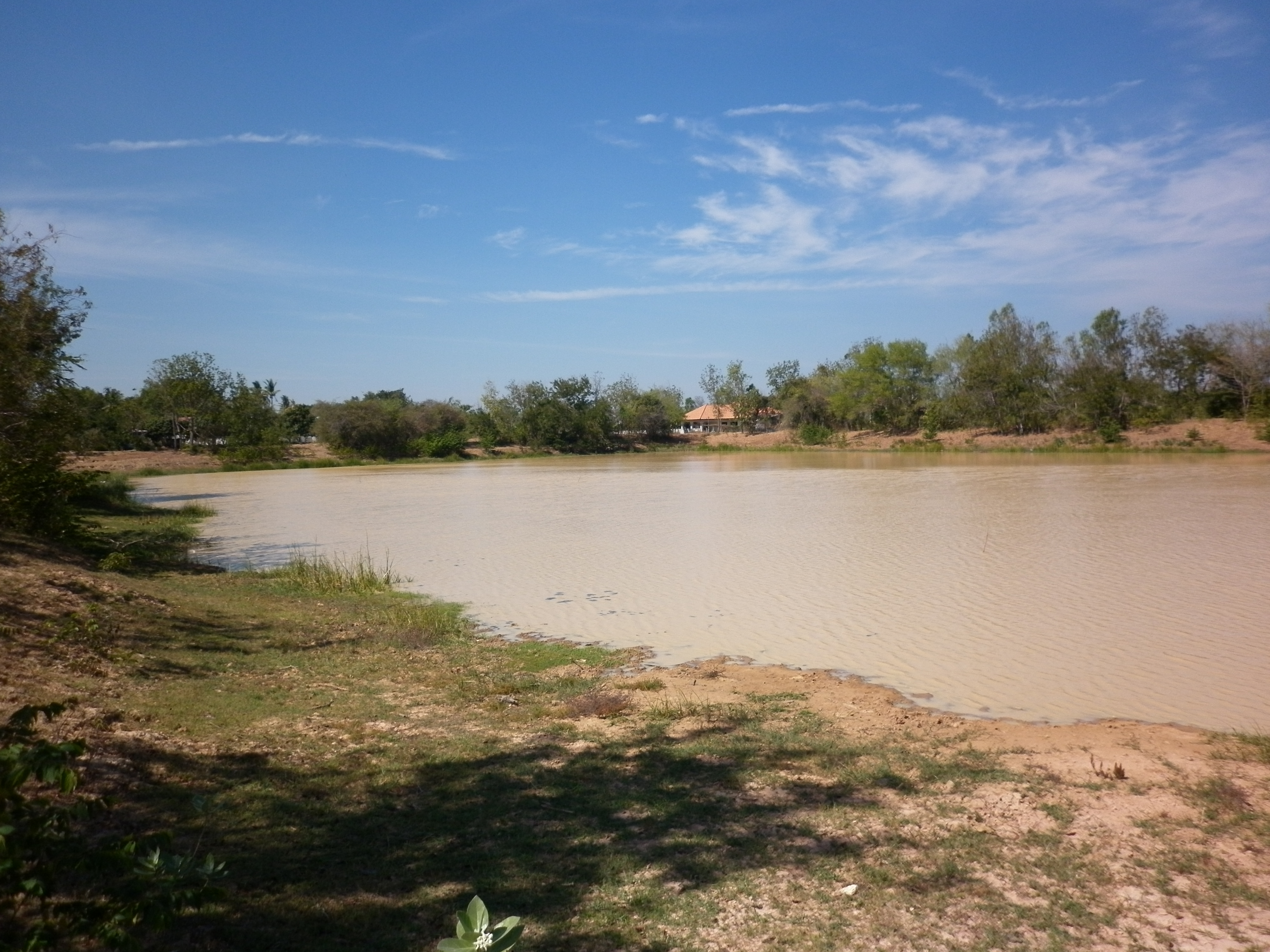
Mueang Pho Reservoir

Neighboring districts are (from the east clockwise) Krasang, Mueang Buriram, Ban Dan and Satuek of Buriram Province.

== History ==
The minor district (king amphoe) Huai Rat was created on 1 April 1990, when the five tambons: Huai Rat, Sam Waeng, Ta Sao, Ban Tako, and Sanuan were split off from Mueang Buriram district. It was upgraded to a full district on 8 September 1995.

== Administration ==
The district is divided into eight districts (tambons), which are further subdivided into 85 villages (mubans). Huai Rat is a township (thesaban tambon) which covers parts of tambon Huai Rat and tambon Huai Racha. There are a further seven tambon administrative organizations (TAO).

| No. | Name | Thai name | Villages | Pop. |
|---|---|---|---|---|
| 1. | Huai Rat | ห้วยราช | 15 | 4,439 |
| 2. | Sam Waeng | สามแวง | 9 | 4,250 |
| 3. | Ta Sao | ตาเสา | 10 | 4,784 |
| 4. | Ban Tako | บ้านตะโก | 9 | 3,248 |
| 5. | Sanuan | สนวน | 12 | 5,334 |
| 6. | Khok Lek | โคกเหล็ก | 11 | 6,154 |
| 7. | Mueang Pho | เมืองโพธิ์ | 9 | 3,558 |
| 8. | Huai Racha | ห้วยราชา | 10 | 4,174 |
