= Khu Mueang district =

Khu Mueang คูเมือง
- District
- District location in Buriram province
- Coordinates: 15°16′18″N 103°0′6″E
- Country: Thailand
- Province: Buriram
- Seat: Khu Mueang

Area
  - Total: 442.0 km^{2} (170.7 sq mi)

Population (2005)
  - Total: 66,839
  - Density: 151.2/km^{2} (392/sq mi)
- Time zone: UTC+7 (ICT)
- Postal code: 31190
- Geocode: 3102

Khu Mueang (Thai: คูเมือง, pronounced [kʰūː mɯ̄aŋ]; Northeastern Thai: คูเมือง, pronounced [kʰûː mɯ̂aŋ]) is a district (amphoe) in the northern part of Buriram province, northeastern Thailand.

== Geography ==
Neighboring districts are (from the east clockwise) Khaen Dong, Satuek, Ban Dan, Mueang Buriram, Lam Plai Mat of Buriram Province, Lam Thamenchai, Mueang Yang of Nakhon Ratchasima province, Phutthaisong of Buriram Province and Chumphon Buri of Surin province.

== Motto ==
The Khu Mueang District's motto is "Sugar factory, Luang U-dom shire, petrified wood and city of civilization."

== History ==
The minor district (king amphoe) was created on 1 October 1969, when the three tambon Khu Mueang, Tum Yai, and Pa Khiap containing 58 villages were split off from Mueang Buriram district. It was upgraded to a full district on 21 August 1975.

== Administration ==
The district is divided into seven sub-districts (tambons), which are further subdivided into 113 villages (mubans). There are two townships (thesaban tambons): Khu Meang covers parts of tambon Khu Mueang and Nong Khaman; Hin Lek Fai covers parts of tambon Hin Lek Fai and also parts of Khu Mueang. There are a further seven tambon administrative organizations (TAO).

No.	Name	Thai name	Villages	Pop.
1.	Khu Mueang	คูเมือง	14	9,319
2.	Pakhiap	ปะเคียบ	17	10,801
3.	Ban Phae	บ้านแพ	11	7,264
4.	Phon Samran	พรสำราญ	19	9,567
5.	Hin Lek Fai	หินเหล็กไฟ	24	10,508
6.	Tum Yai	ตูมใหญ่	18	11,971
7.	Nong Khaman	หนองขมาร	10	7,409
