= Khaen Dong district =

Khaen Dong แคนดง
- District
- District location in Buriram province
- Coordinates: 15°18′36″N 103°7′24″E
- Country: Thailand
- Province: Buriram
- Seat: Khaen Dong

Area
  - Total: 298.0 km^{2} (115.1 sq mi)

Population (2005)
  - Total: 31,908
  - Density: 107.1/km^{2} (277/sq mi)
- Time zone: UTC+7 (ICT)
- Postal code: 31150
- Geocode: 3122

Khaen Dong (Thai: แคนดง, pronounced [kʰɛ̄ːn dōŋ]; Northeastern Thai: แคนดง, pronounced [kʰɛ̂ːn dōŋ]) is a district (amphoe) in the northern part of Buriram province, northeastern Thailand.

== Geography ==
Neighboring districts are (from the east clockwise) Satuek, Ban Dan and Khu Mueang of Buriram Province and Chumphon Buri of Surin province.

== Motto ==
The Khaen Dong District's motto is "The city of iron wood and rubber, rocket festival, clear water, Kud Ta Lae Suan, Lamtakhong reservoir and Mun river Long island-Pak Tad Beach so beautiful, ancient city."

== History ==
The minor district (king amphoe) was established on 1 July 1997, when it was split off from Satuek district.

On 15 May 2007, all 81 minor districts in Thailand were upgraded to full districts. With publication in the Royal Gazette on August 24 the upgrade became official.

== Administration ==
The district is divided into four sub-districts (tambons), which are further subdivided into 61 villages (mubans). Khaen Dong is a township (thesaban tambon) which covers parts of tambon Khaen Dong. There are also four tambon administrative organizations (TAO).

No.	Name	Thai name	Villages	Pop.
1.	Khaen Dong	แคนดง	25	11,990
2.	Dong Phlong	ดงพลอง	13	6,603
3.	Sa Bua	สระบัว	12	5,921
4.	Hua Fai	หัวฝาย	11	7,394
