= Mueang Buriram district =

District of Thailand

Buriram
- District
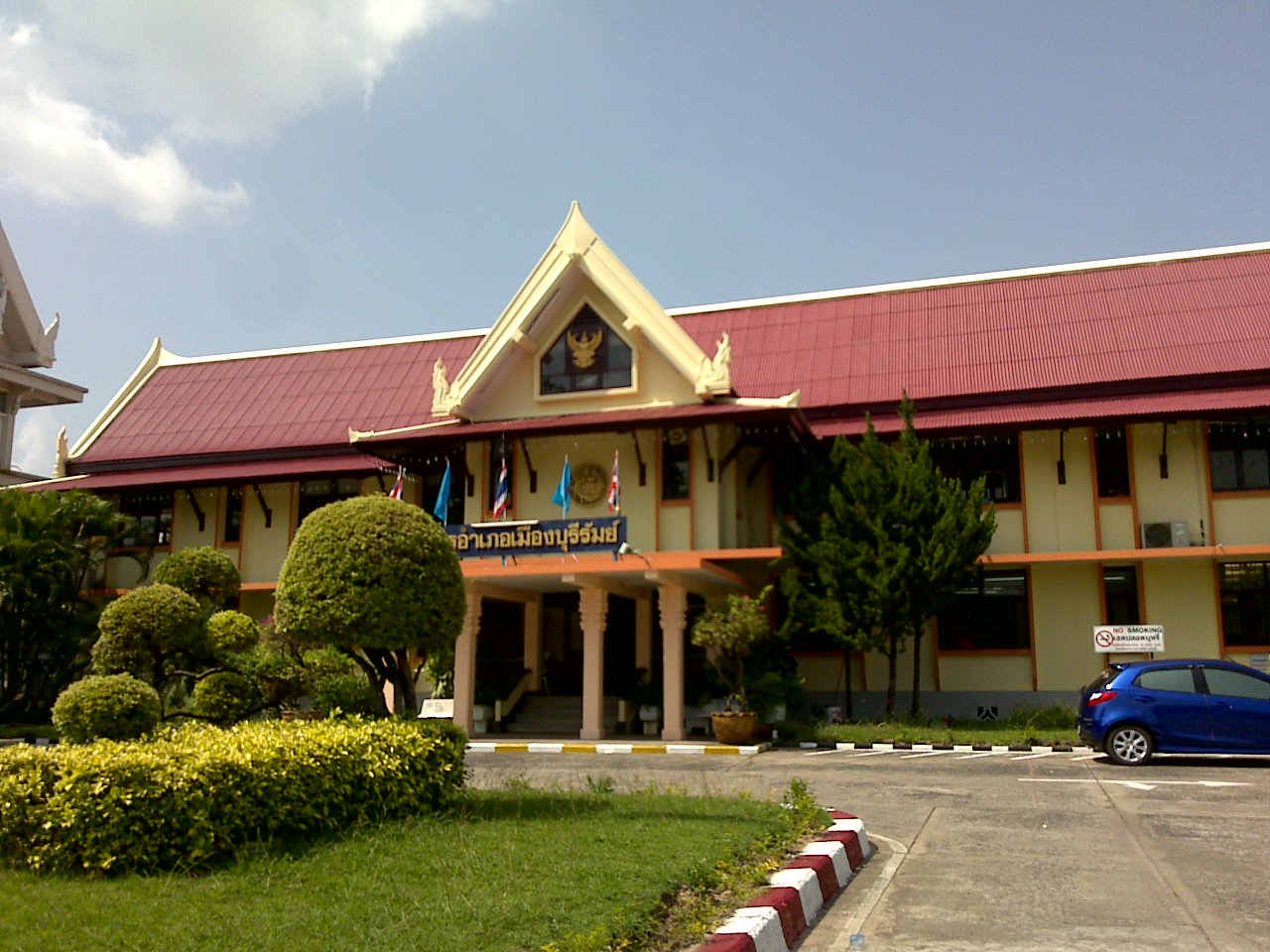
- Mueang Buriram District Office

- District location in Buriram province
- Coordinates: 14°59′42″N 103°6′12″E
- Country: Thailand
- Province: Buriram

Area
  - Total: 621.5 km^{2} (240.0 sq mi)

Population (2005)
  - Total: 207,249
  - Density: 333.5/km^{2} (864/sq mi)
- Time zone: UTC+7 (ICT)
- Postal code: 31000
- Geocode: 3101

Mueang Buriram (Thai: เมืองบุรีรัมย์, RTGS: Mueang Buri Ram, pronounced [mɯ̄aŋ bū.rīː rām]; Northeastern Thai: เมืองบุรีรัมย์, pronounced [mɯ̂aŋ bū.lîː lâm]) is the capital district (amphoe mueang) of Buriram province, northeastern Thailand.

== Geography ==
Neighboring districts are (from the south clockwise): Prakhon Chai, Nang Rong, Chamni, Lam Plai Mat, Khu Mueang, Ban Dan, Huai Rat, and Krasang of Buriram Province.

== Motto ==
The Mueang Buriram District's motto is "stone from Kradong Volcano erupted, bird filed park, Rama I's founder of the city, Suphat Thara Bophit Buddha image and excellent tradition."

== Administration ==
The district is divided into 19 sub-districts (tambons), which are further subdivided into 320 villages (mubans). The City (thesaban nakhon) Buriram covers the whole tambon Nai Mueang, tambon Isan and parts tambon Samet. There are also 18 tambon administrative organizations (TAO).

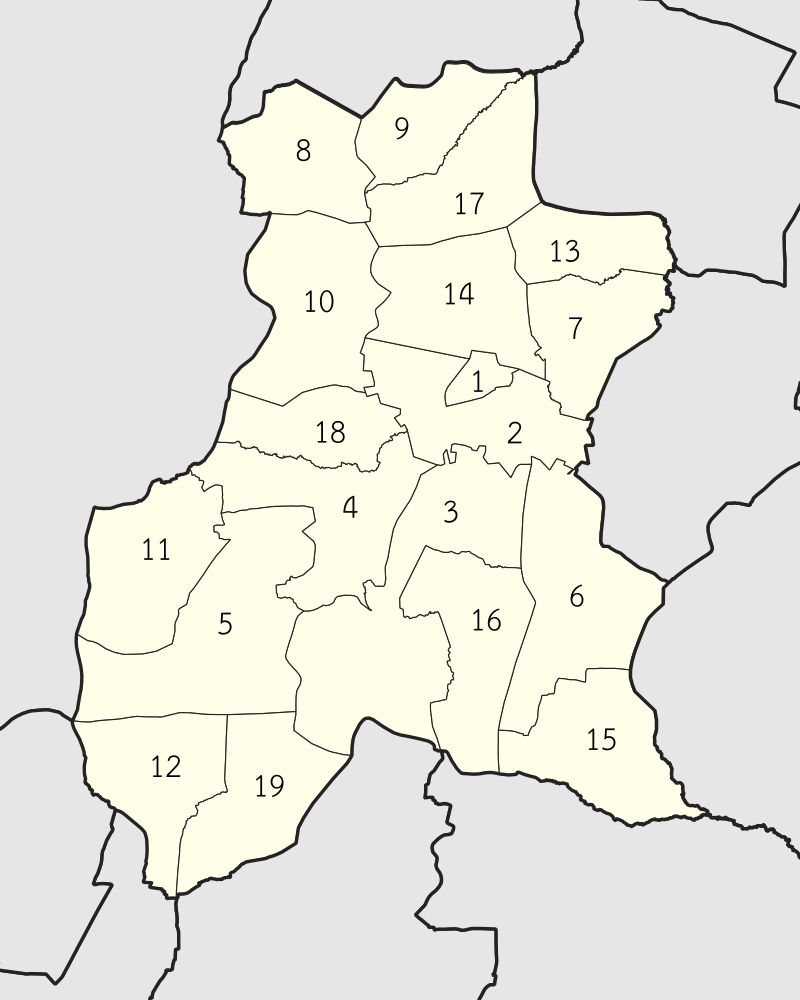
Tambons of Mueang Buriram district

No.	Name	Thai name	Villages	Pop.
1.	Nai Mueang	ในเมือง	-	28,333
2.	Isan	อิสาณ	-	14,637
3.	Samet	เสม็ด	18	16,979
4.	Ban Bua	บ้านบัว	18	9,743
5.	Sakae Phrong	สะแกโพรง	26	12,675
6.	Sawai Chik	สวายจีก	19	11,550
7.	Ban Yang	บ้านยาง	19	12,846
8.	Phra Khru	พระครู	13	6,709
9.	Thalung Lek	ถลุงเหล็ก	16	5,706
10.	Nong Tat	หนองตาด	22	10,634
11.	Lumpuk	ลุมปุ๊ก	19	8,015
12.	Song Hong	สองห้อง	16	6,988
13.	Bua Thong	บัวทอง	15	6,470
14.	Chum Het	ชุมเห็ด	22	17,854
15.	Lak Khet	หลักเขต	14	6,463
16.	Sakae Sam	สะแกซำ	17	10,052
17.	Kalantha	กลันทา	13	7,007
18.	Krasang	กระสัง	19	7,009
19.	Mueang Fang	เมืองฝาง	16	7,579

Missing numbers are tambons which now form the districts Ban Dan and Huai Rat.
