= Krasang district =

Krasang กระสัง
- District
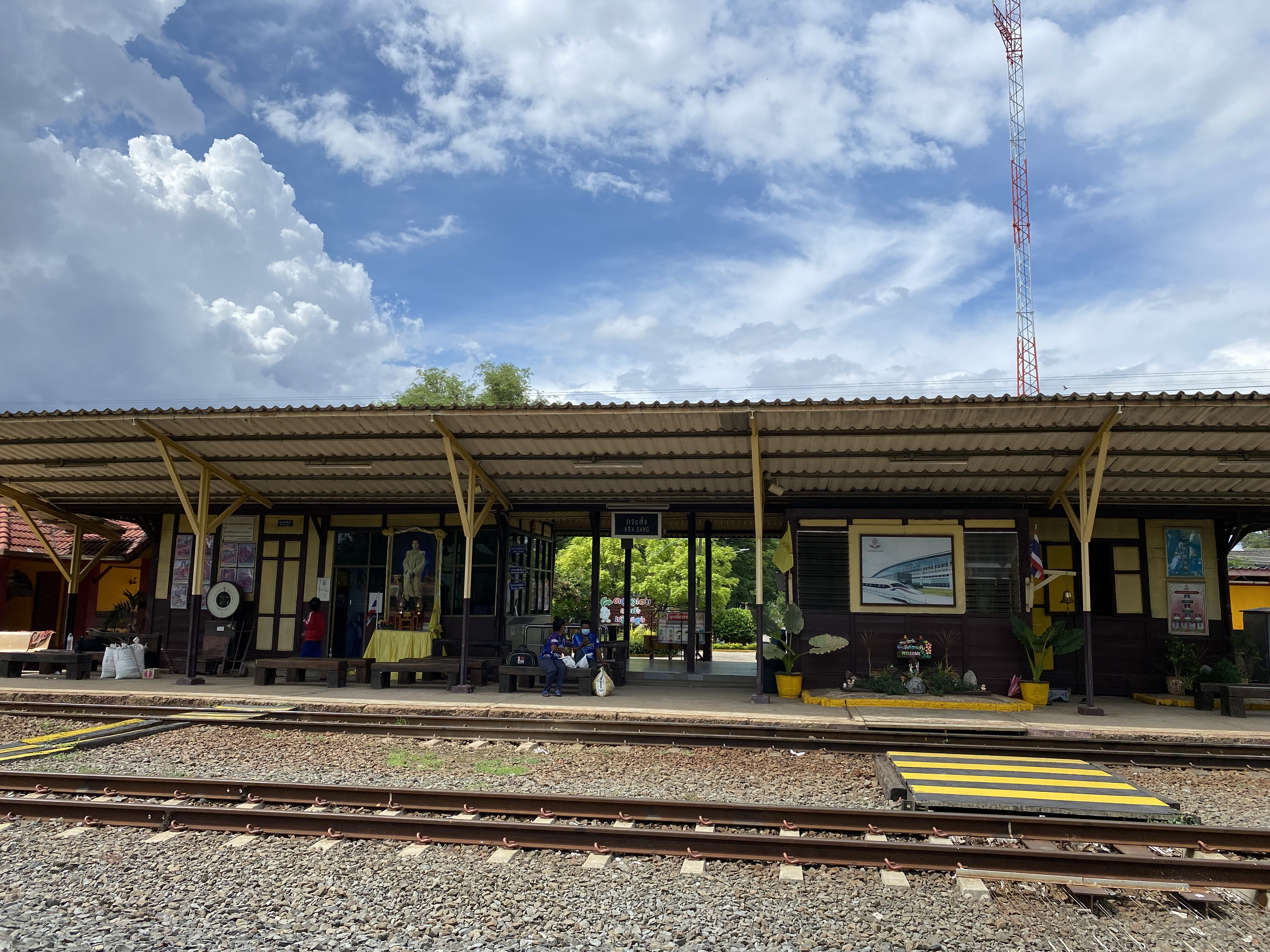
- Krasang railway station

- District location in Buriram province
- Coordinates: 14°55′18″N 103°18′6″E
- Country: Thailand
- Province: Buriram
- Seat: Krasang

Area
  - Total: 652.700 km^{2} (252.009 sq mi)

Population (2005)
  - Total: 103,043
  - Density: 157.9/km^{2} (409/sq mi)
- Time zone: UTC+7 (ICT)
- Postal code: 31160
- Geocode: 3103

Krasang (Thai: กระสัง, pronounced [krā.sǎŋ]) is a district (amphoe) in the eastern part of Buriram province, northeastern Thailand.

== Geography ==
Neighboring districts are (from the south clockwise) Phlapphla Chai, Mueang Buriram, Huai Rat, Satuek of Buriram Province and Mueang Surin of Surin province.

== History ==
Originally part of tambon Song Chan of Mueang Buriram district, Krasang was made a tambon in 1937. On 26 April 1952 the three tambons Krasang, Song Chang, and Lamduan were placed together to form the minor district (king amphoe) Krasang. It was upgraded to a full district on 23 July 1958.

== Administration ==
The district is divided into 11 sub-districts (tambons), which are further subdivided into 167 villages (mubans). Krasang is a township (thesaban tambon) which covers parts of tambon Krasang. There are a further 11 tambon administrative organizations (TAO).

No.	Name	Thai name	Villages	Pop.
1.	Krasang	กระสัง	21	15,150
2.	Lamduan	ลำดวน	18	11,372
3.	Song Chan	สองชั้น	17	11,929
4.	Sung Noen	สูงเนิน	19	10,473
5.	Nong Teng	หนองเต็ง	18	11,871
6.	Mueang Phai	เมืองไผ่	13	7,103
7.	Chum Saeng	ชุมแสง	12	6,538
8.	Ban Prue	บ้านปรือ	15	8,674
9.	Huai Samran	ห้วยสำราญ	14	6,992
10.	Kantharom	กันทรารมย์	12	8,467
11.	Si Phum	ศรีภูมิ	8	4,474
