= Buriram province =

Coordinates: 14°59′39″N 103°6′8″E

Buriram บุรีรัมย์ (Thai) มฺืงแปะ (Northern Khmer)
- Province
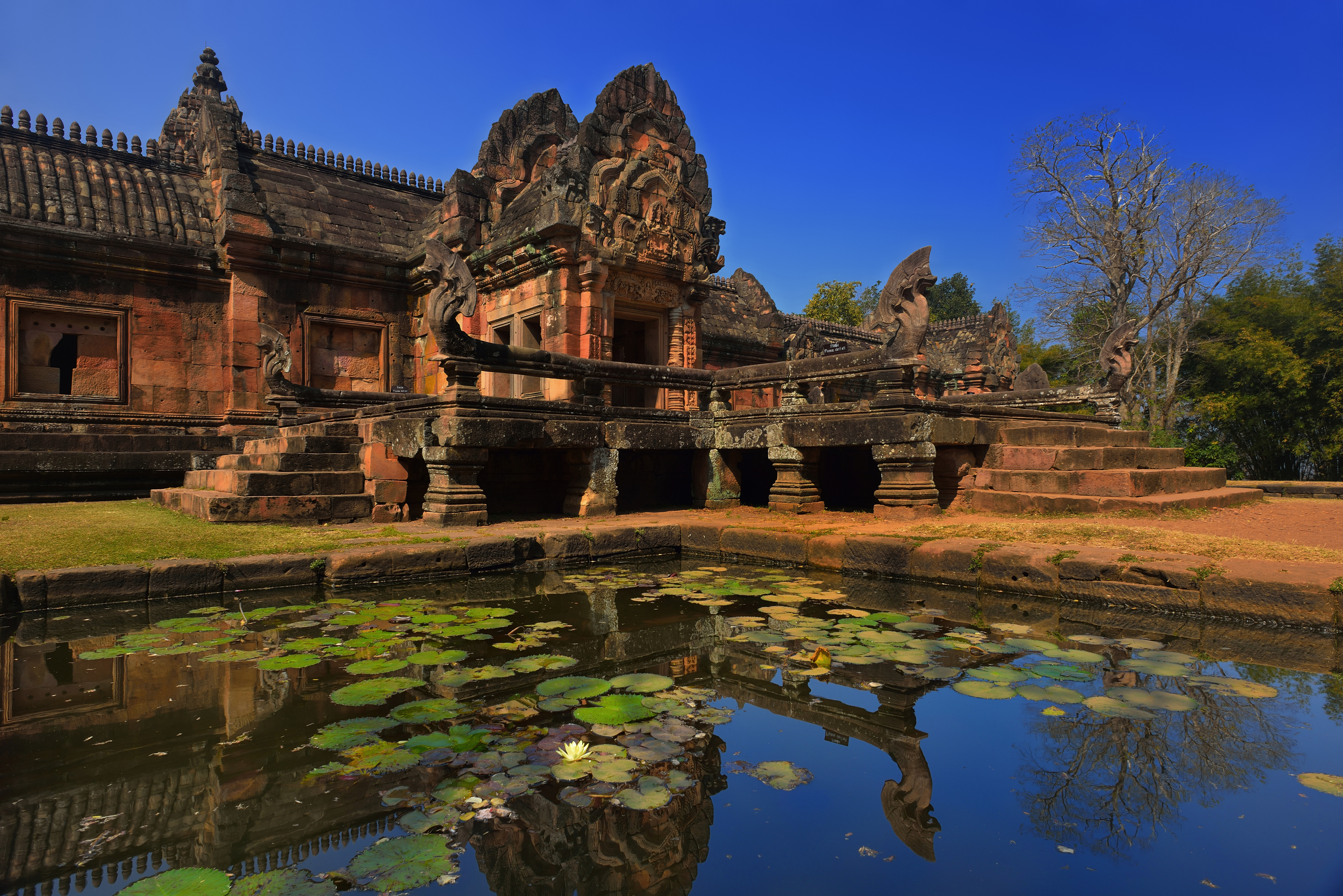
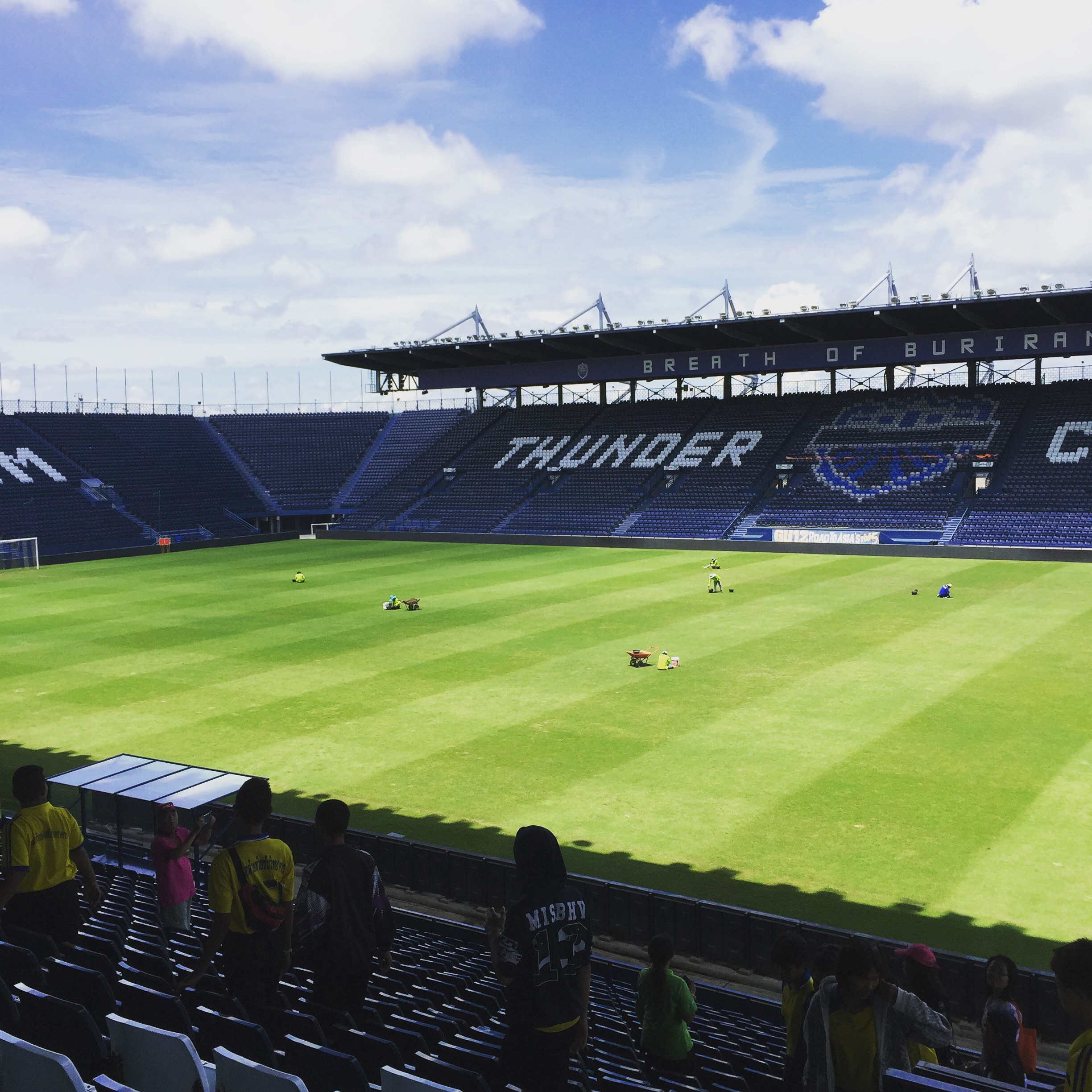
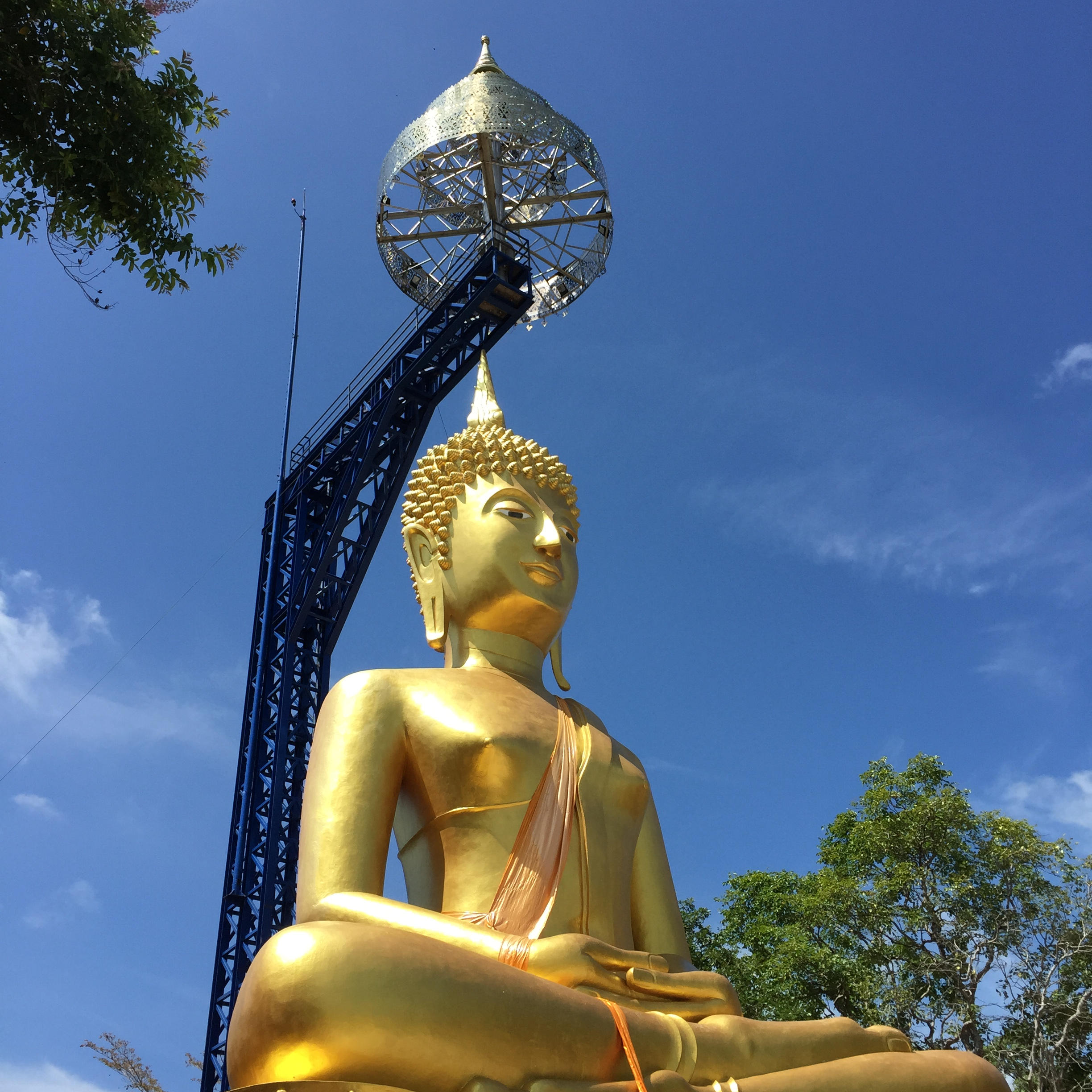
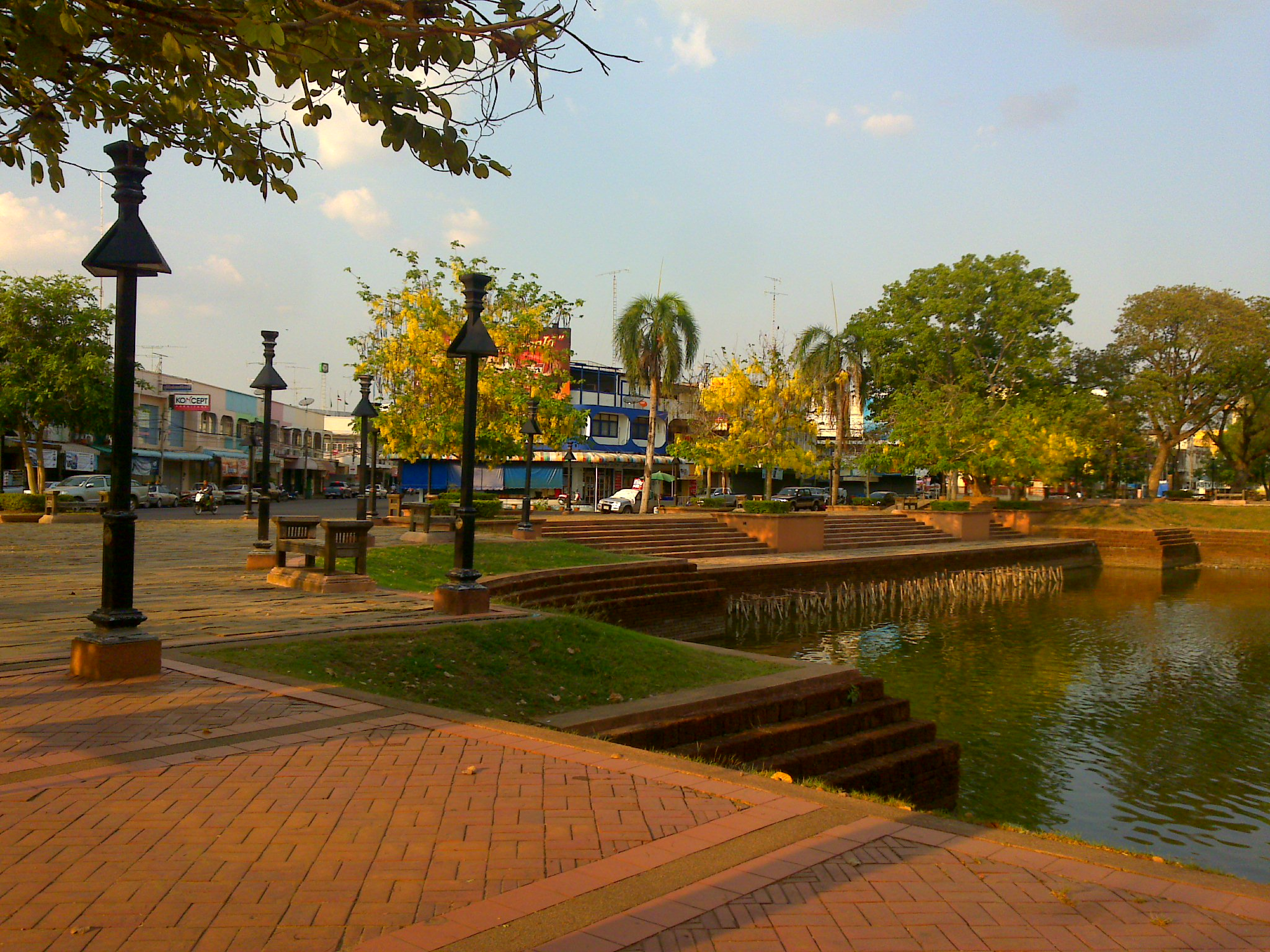
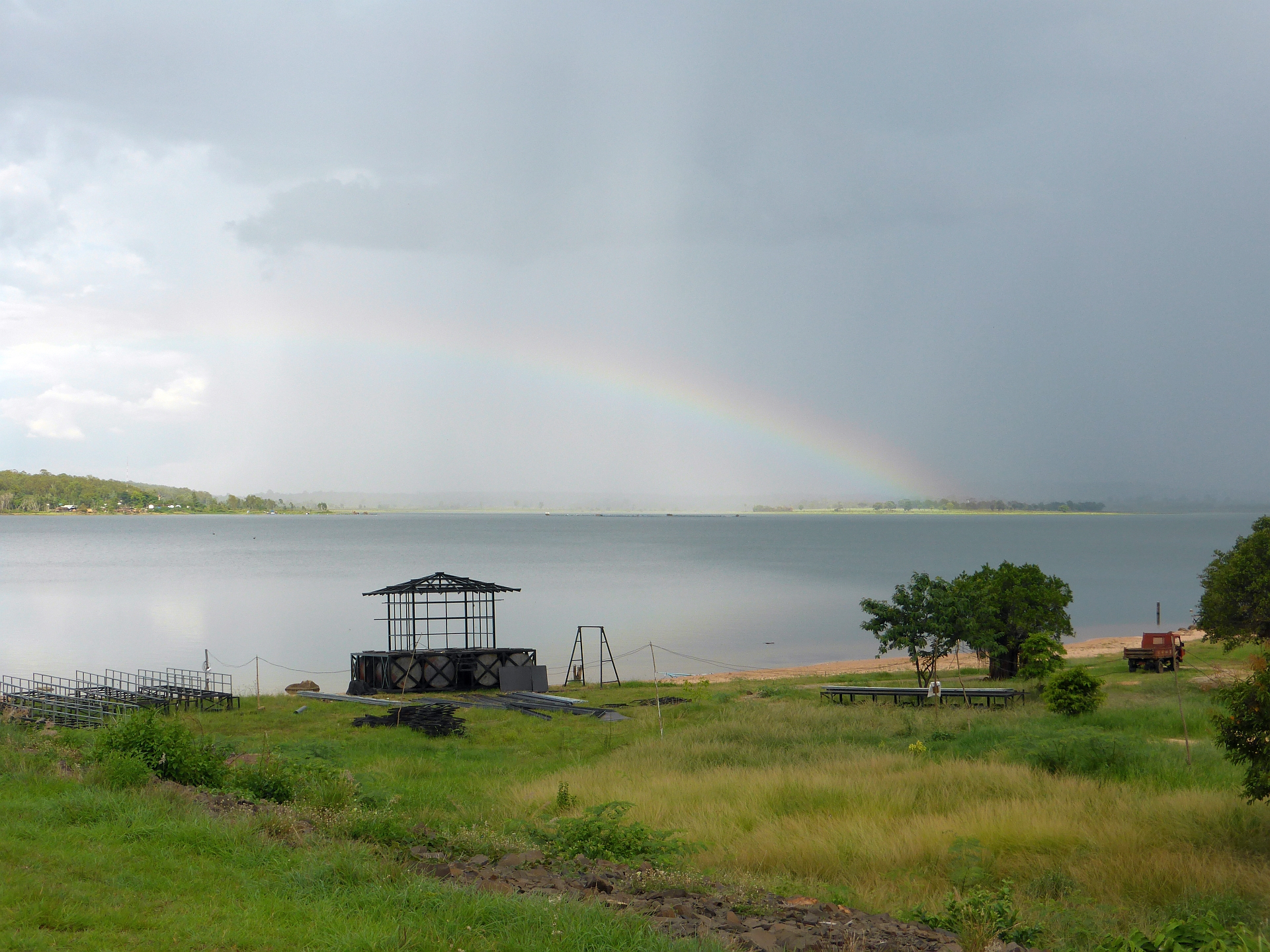
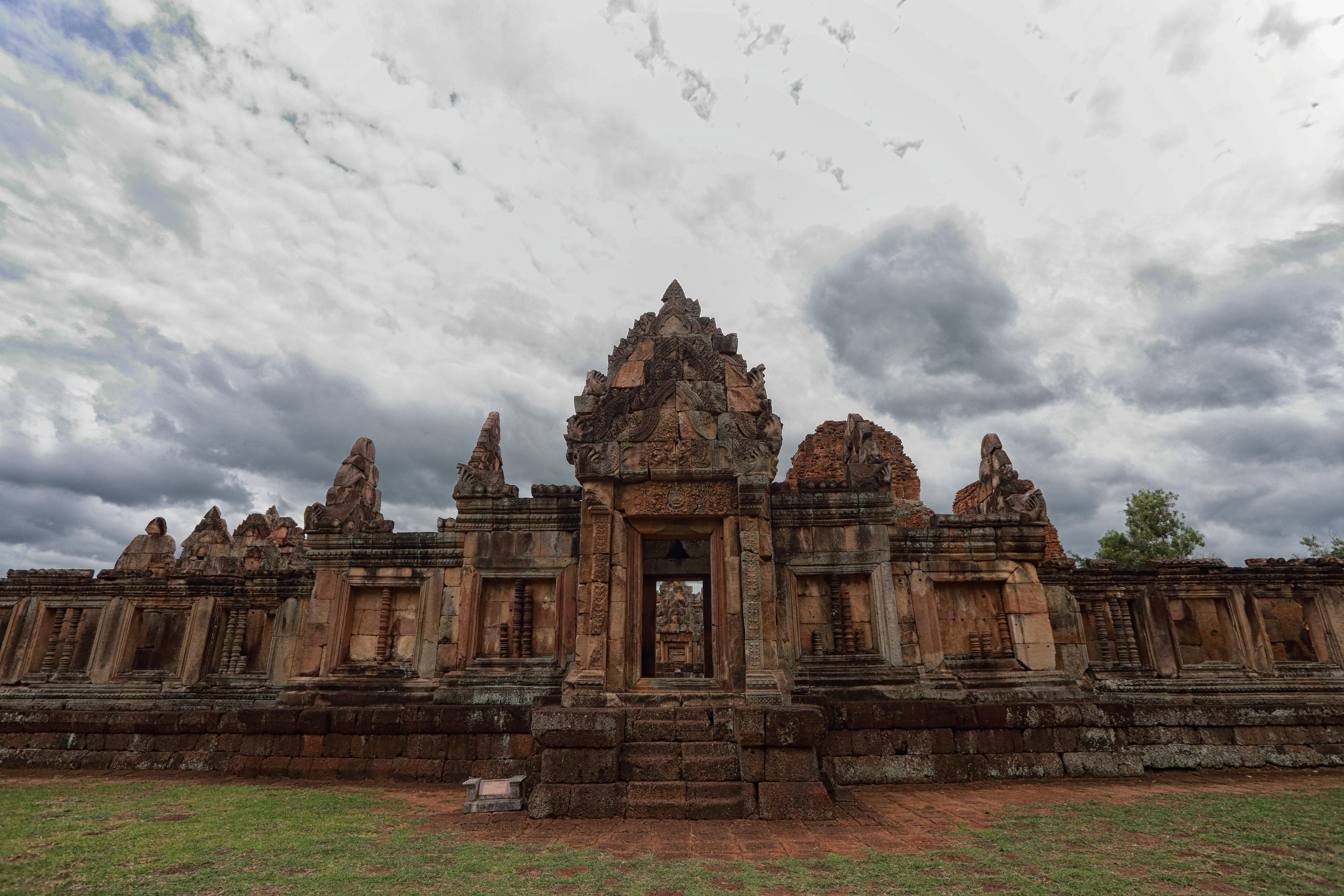
- Clockwise from top: Phanom Rung Historical Park, Chang Arena, Khao Kradong Forest Park, Romburi Park, Lam Nang Rong Dam, Prasat Muang Tam

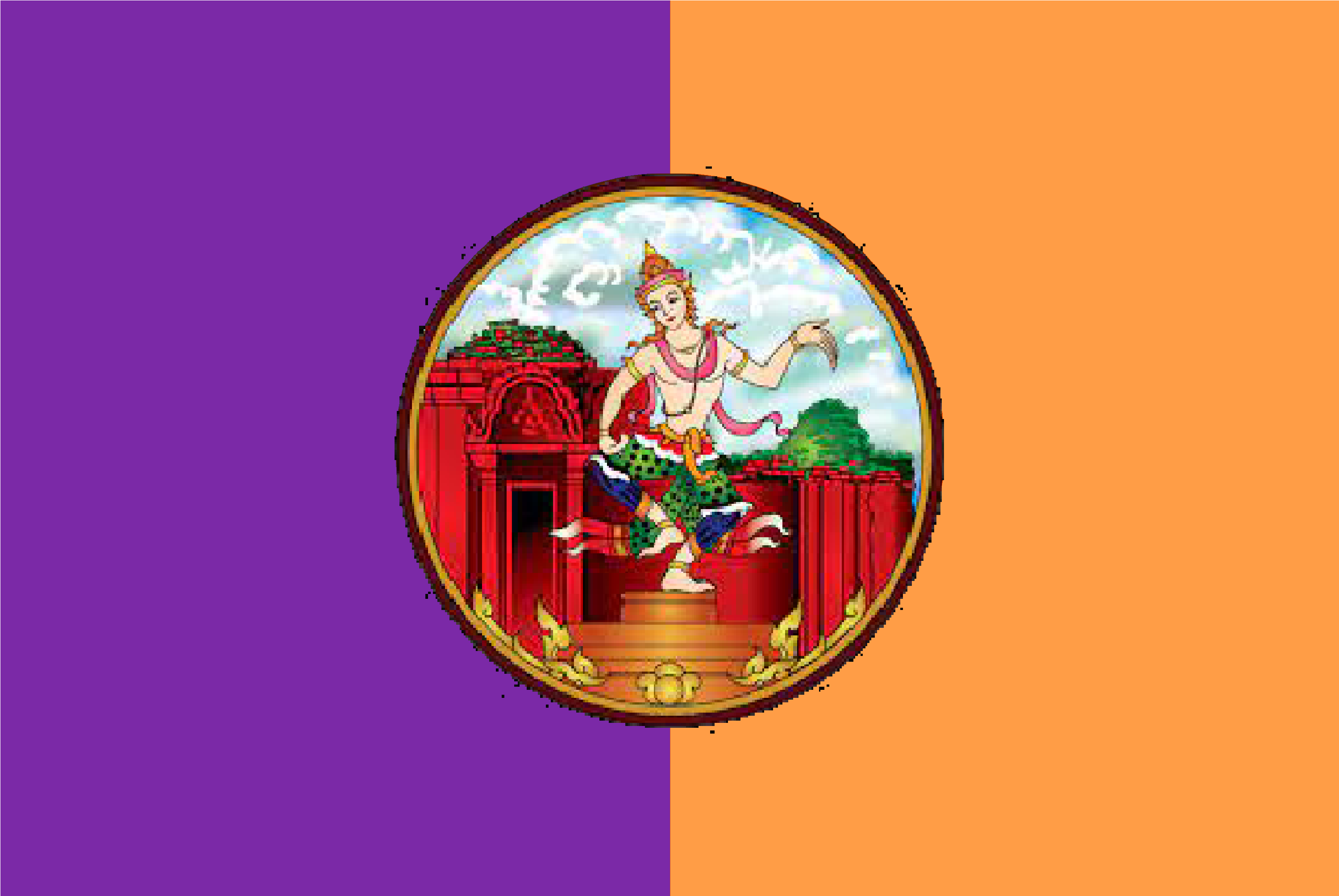
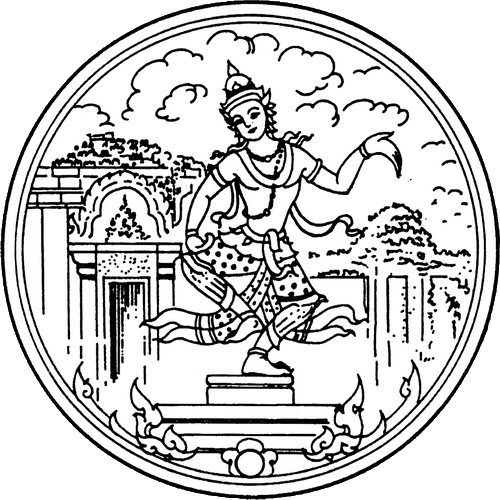
- Flag Seal
- Mottoes: เมืองปราสาทหิน ถิ่นภูเขาไฟ ผ้าไหมสวย รวยวัฒนธรรม เลิศล้ำเมืองกีฬา ("Town of stone castles. Land of volcanoes. Beautiful silk. Rich in culture. Superb sports city")
- Map of Thailand highlighting Buriram province
- Country: Thailand
- Capital: Buriram

Government
  - Type: Province and Provincial Administrative Organization
  - Body: Buriram Province and Buriram Provincial Administrative Organization
  - Governor: Piya Pijnam
  - PAO Chief Executive: Phusit Lekudakorn

Area
  - Total: 10,080 km^{2} (3,890 sq mi)
  - Rank: 17th

Population (2024)
  - Total: ▼1,566,308
  - Rank: 7th
  - Density: 155/km^{2} (400/sq mi)
  - Rank: 24th

Human Achievement Index
  - HAI (2022): 0.6136 "low" Ranked 72nd

GDP
  - Total: baht 84 billion (US$2.7 billion) (2019)
- Time zone: UTC+7 (ICT)
- Postal code: 31xxx
- Calling code: 044
- ISO 3166 code: TH-31
- Vehicle registration: บุรีรัมย์
- Website: buriram.go.th bpao.go.th

Buriram province (Thai: จังหวัดบุรีรัมย์, RTGS: Changwat Buri Ram, pronounced [tɕāŋ.wàt bū.rīː.rām]) is one of Thailand's seventy-seven provinces (changwat) and lies in lower northeastern Thailand, also called Isan. Neighboring provinces are (from south clockwise) Sa Kaeo, Nakhon Ratchasima, Khon Kaen, Maha Sarakham, and Surin. The name "Buriram" means 'city of happiness'.

== History ==
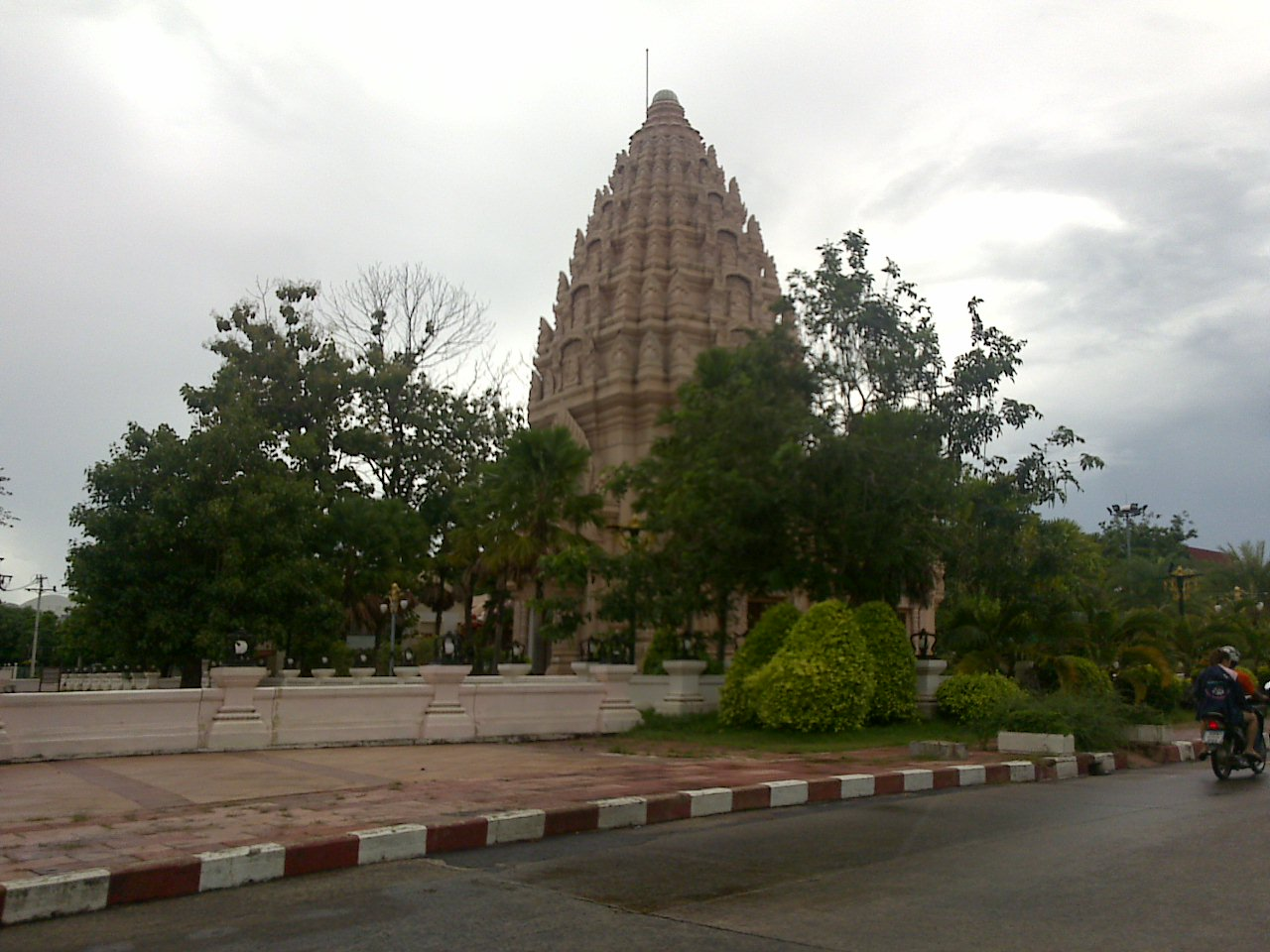
Buriram City Pillar is similar to Prasat Phnom Rung.

Archaeological work has found evidence of habitation from prehistoric times through the Dvaravati period, and remains of the Khmer Empire in the form of one brick sanctuary and more than sixty of stone. Kiln sites, pottery and the earthenware known as Khmer ware have also been recorded. The written record resumes at the end of the Ayutthaya period, when the place appears as an old town, and Buriram is recorded as a town through the Thonburi period and into the Rattanakosin period.

The Khorat Plateau is rich in natural salt. The basal layers of some salt mounds in Buriram and Nakhon Ratchasima provinces lie with water-storage tanks, furnaces and Phimai black pottery. That association has been taken to date salt making in the area as early as about 500 BCE.

In 1964, after a heavy rainstorm, villagers found more than three hundred Buddhist bronzes wrapped in cloth in an underground chamber at a small, deserted brick temple of the 7th century at Prakhon Chai. Some of the images have been dated to the 6th century, and the hoard is given as among the earliest Mahayana Buddhist sculpture in Southeast Asia. The bronzes have been read as a synthesis of Dvaravati and pre-Angkorian styles carrying a considerable measure of local traits. A few resemble Dvaravati-style Buddha figures from central Thailand, while most recall the pre-Angkorian Cambodian styles of Prei Kmeng, Prasat Andet and Kampong Preah. The sculptures are reported as the products of a longstanding local tradition tied to Mahayana belief, giving special importance to Maitreya or Avalokitesvara.

The kiln sites lie in the south of the province. More than two hundred kiln mounds are recorded at Ban Kruat and Lahan Sai, working between the 10th and the 12th centuries and supplying the Angkorian world with stoneware. Their wares travelled far to the west. They are among the material found at Ban Nong Chaeng in Don Chedi, Suphan Buri, with Northern and Southern Song ceramics and Northern Song coins. Production of the stoneware exported through the Khmer empire ceased by about 1300, when temples, cities and reservoirs also stopped being built in the region and no more inscriptions were written.

About a thousand years ago, the area that makes up today's Buriram Province was under the Khmer Empire and many ruins remain from that time. The largest, standing on an extinct volcano, is in the Phanom Rung Historical Park. According to an inscription found there, its local ruler recognised the authority of the Khmer king. The cone rises high above the Buriram plain southeast of Phimai. The temple built on it early in the Angkorian period has been read as the outstanding example in the region of a pattern in which religious structures went up at places already held sacred before integration under Angkor. Buildings of one plan and size stand 10 to 15 km apart along the routes between the major centres. They have been read as rest houses for pilgrims travelling to Angkor, or from Angkor to the temples at Phimai and Phanom Rung. However, the area was remote and sparsely populated, and little is recorded about it until the Rattanakosin Kingdom. In the early-19th century, Muang Pae, the largest town, acknowledged Thai sovereignty and was renamed Buriram. Following administrative reforms in the late-19th century, Buriram was formally incorporated into Thailand as a province with its own governor.

== Geography ==
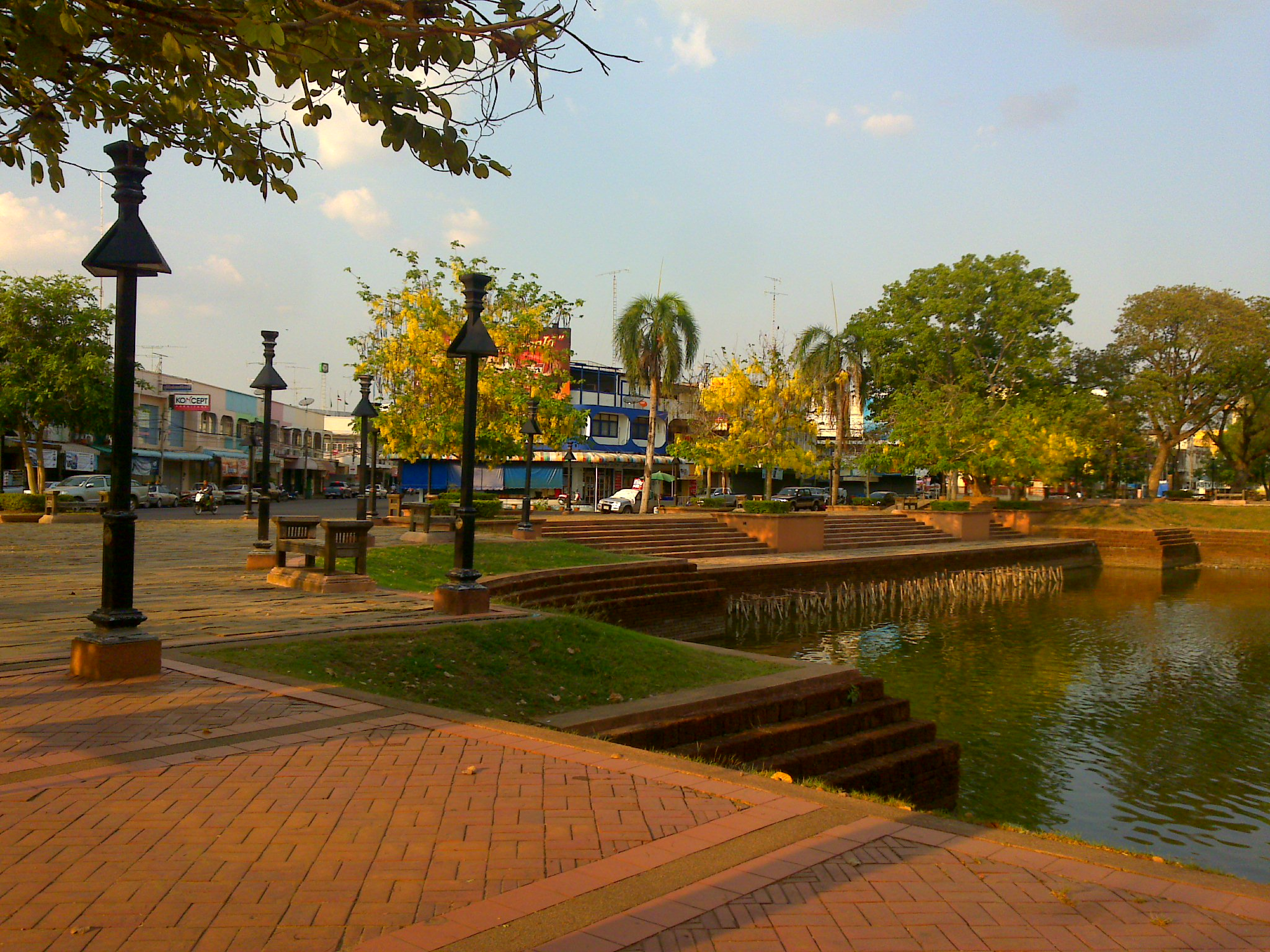
Romburi Park (สวนรมย์บุรี), Buriram

Buriram is at the south end of the Khorat Plateau, with several extinct volcanoes around the province. The southern limit of the province is a mountainous area at the limit between the Sankamphaeng Range and the Dângrêk Mountains. The total forest area is 887 km^{2} (342 sq mi) or 8.8 percent of provincial area.

=== National park ===
The province has one national park. Along with three other national parks, the park makes up region 1 (Prachinburi) of Thailand's protected areas.(Visitors in fiscal year 2024)

Ta Phraya National Park	594 km^{2} (229 sq mi)	(5,662)

=== Wildlife sanctuary ===
The province has one wildlife sanctuary. Along with two other wildlife sanctuaries, the sanctuary makes up region 7 (Nakhon Ratchasima) of Thailand's protected areas.

Dong Yai Wildlife Sanctuary	312.8 km^{2} (120.8 sq mi)

== Culture ==
=== Festivals ===
Aside from important religious days like Songkran Day and New Year's Day, Buriram also has other local festivals such as the festival of the 5th lunar month. At that festival residents make merit, bathe Buddha images and the aged, and play traditional sports such as Saba and tug of war. In some areas like Phutthaisong District, it is custom to do the Bang Fai traditional rocket dance, Khao Phansa, at the beginning of Buddhist Lent and Loi Krathong.

== Demographics ==
Buriram is one of the northeastern provinces. The Isan and Central Thai language is spoken by most, but according to the most recent census 18% of the population also speak Northern Khmer in everyday life too.

== Symbols ==
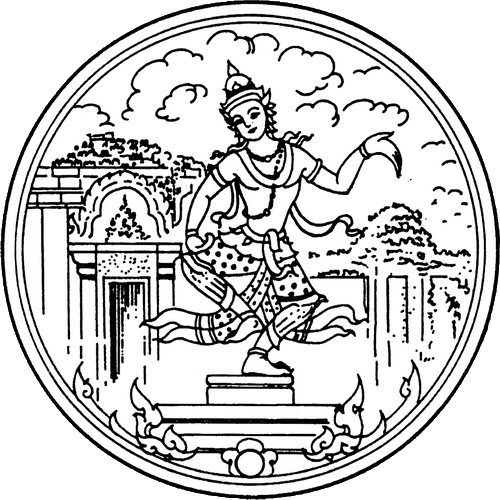
The provincial seal

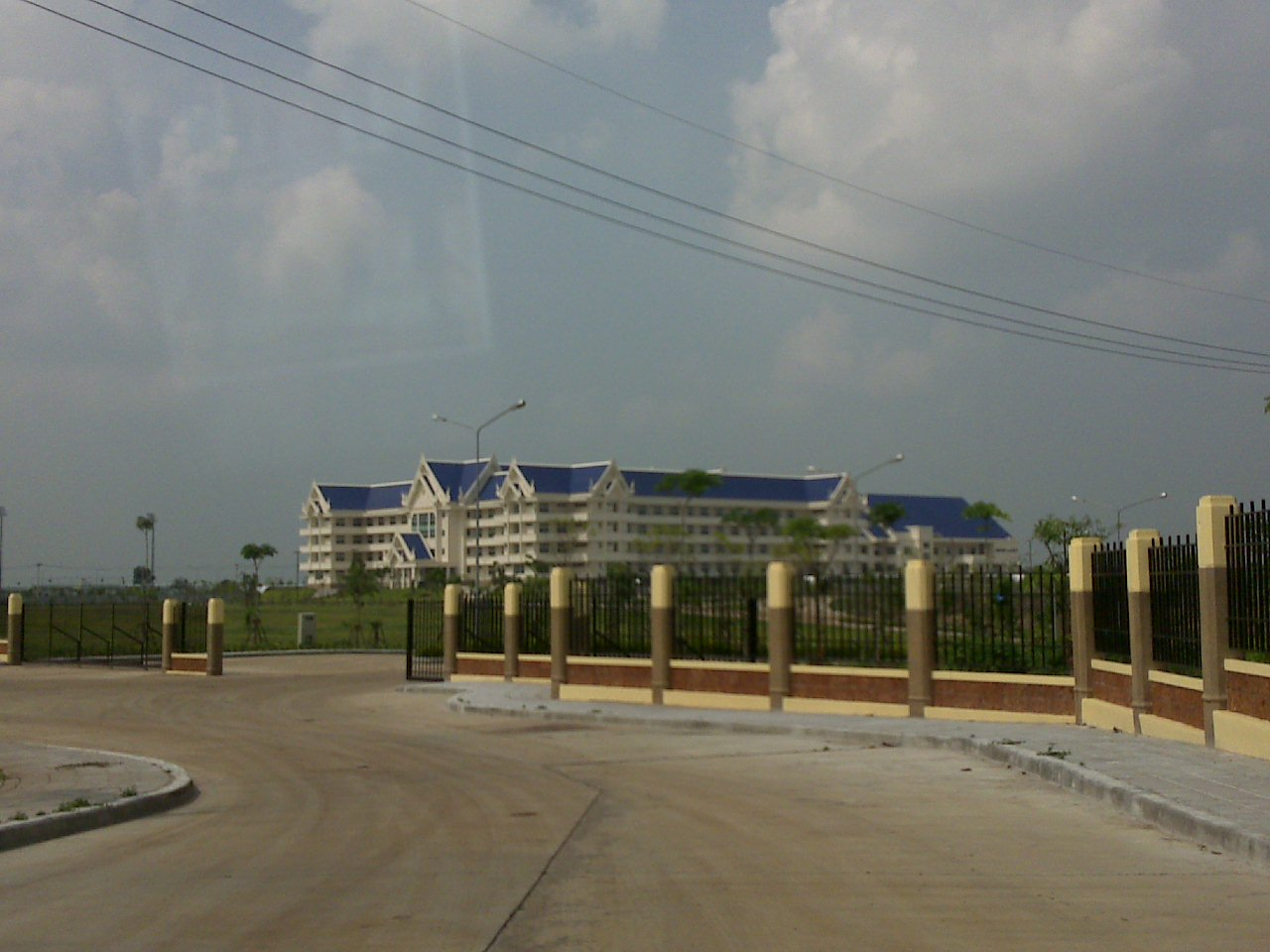
Buriram New Provincial Office

The provincial seal depicts Phanom Rung temple, a Khmer-style Hindu shrine dedicated to Shiva. It was in use from the 9th through the 12th centuries, when the Khmer Empire's control of the region was ended by the Thais of Ayutthaya Kingdom. The ruins are now preserved in a historical park.

The provincial flower is the yellow cotton tree (Cochlospermum regium). The provincial tree is the pink shower (Cassia grandis). The Asian glass shrimp (Macrobrachium lanchesteri) is the provincial aquatic animal.

The province's motto is "the city of sandstone sanctuaries, land of volcanoes, beautiful silk, rich culture and the best city of sport".

== Administrative divisions ==
Map of twenty three districts

=== Provincial government ===
The province is divided into 23 districts (amphoes). The districts are further divided into 189 subdistricts (tambons) and 2,212 villages (mubans).

1. Mueang Buriram
2. Khu Mueang
3. Krasang
4. Nang Rong
5. Nong Ki
6. Lahan Sai
7. Prakhon Chai
8. Ban Kruat
9. Phutthaisong
10. Lam Plai Mat
11. Satuek
12. Pakham
13. Na Pho
14. Nong Hong
15. Phlapphla Chai
16. Huai Rat
17. Non Suwan
18. Chamni
19. Ban Mai Chaiyaphot
20. Non Din Daeng
21. Ban Dan
22. Khaen Dong
23. Chaloem Phra Kiat

=== Local government ===
As of 26 November 2019 there are: one Buriram Provincial Administration Organisation (ongkan borihan suan changwat) and 62 municipal (thesaban) areas in the province. Buriram, Chum Het and Nang Rong have town (thesaban mueang) status. Further 59 subdistrict municipalities (thesaban tambon). The non-municipal areas are administered by 146 Subdistrict Administrative Organisations - SAO (ongkan borihan suan tambon).

== Transport ==
=== Airports ===
Buriram Airport is the only airport in Buriram province. Two airlines, Nok Air and Thai AirAsia, serve Buriram from Don Mueang International Airport (DMK).

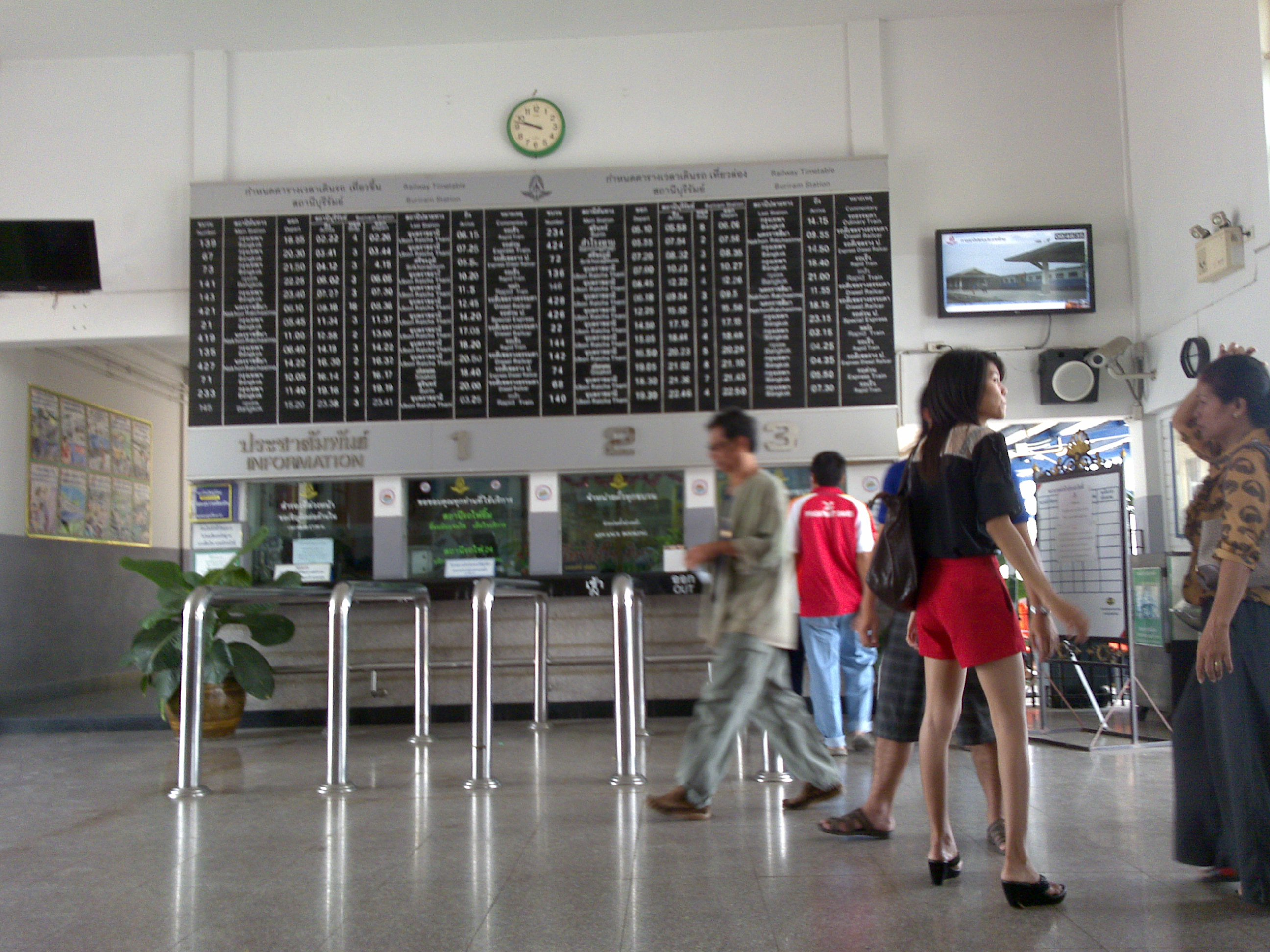
Station hall in Buriram Railway Station

=== Highways ===
- Highway 218: Buriram - Nang Rong
- Highway 219: Ban Kruat - Prakhon Chai - Buriram - Ban Dan - Satuek - Phayakkhaphum Phisai - Yang Sisurat - Na Chueak - Borabue
- Highway 226: Nakhon Ratchasima - Chaloem Phra Kiat - Chakkarat - Huai Thalaeng - Lam Plai Mat - Buriram - Krasang - Surin - Sikhoraphum - Samrong Thap - Huai Thap Than - Uthumphon Phisai - Sisaket - Kanthararom - Warin Chamrap - Ubon Ratchathani
- Highway 2074: Buriram - Khu Mueang - Phutthaisong

=== Intercity transit ===
State Railway of Thailand (SRT), the national passenger rail system, provides service to Buriram at the Buriram Railway Station. SRT provides many services such as limited express trains to Bangkok and Ubon Ratchathani, commuter trains to Nakhon Ratchasima and beyond.

The Transport Co., Ltd. operates a bus depot at Buriram Bus Station, and Nakhonchai Air has its bus station adjacent.

=== Public transit ===
The Buriram Songthaew System (BSS) provides public transportation for the city. BSS was established many years ago. There are two lines: Line 1 (Buriram Municipality Market-Khao Kradong Forest Park Line), and Line 2 (Ban Bua Line). Both lines are colored pink.

== Health ==
Buriram's main hospital is Buriram Hospital operated by the Ministry of Public Health.

== Sports ==
Buriram promotes itself as a city of sport. Buriram United is the most successful football team in Thailand after sweeping all before them by winning the league, the FA Cup, the League Cup, and AFC Champions League quarter-finalist. Buriram United play home games at Chang Arena, the largest club-owned football stadium in Thailand.

A FIA Grade 1 and FIM Grade A racing circuit, Chang International Circuit, is near Chang Arena.

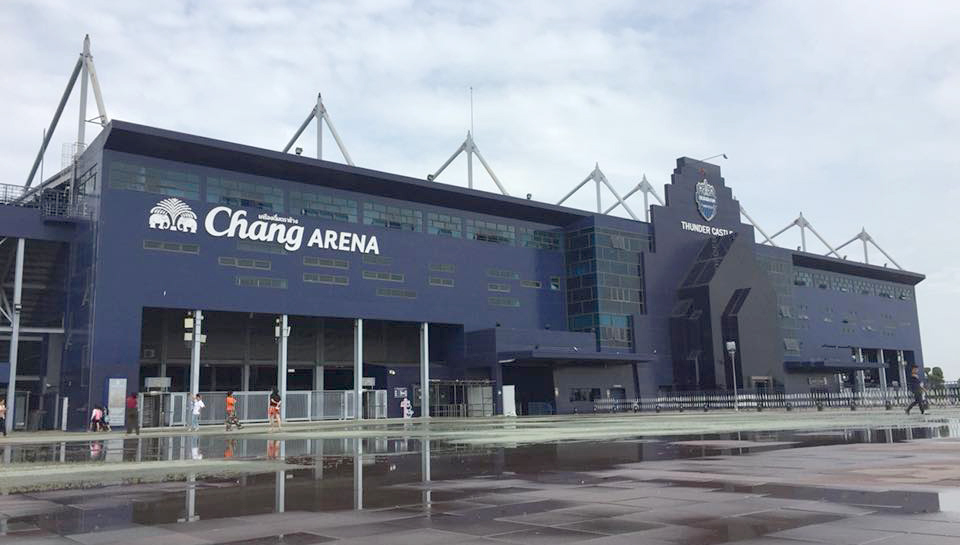
Chang Arena the largest club-owned football stadium in Thailand of Buriram United

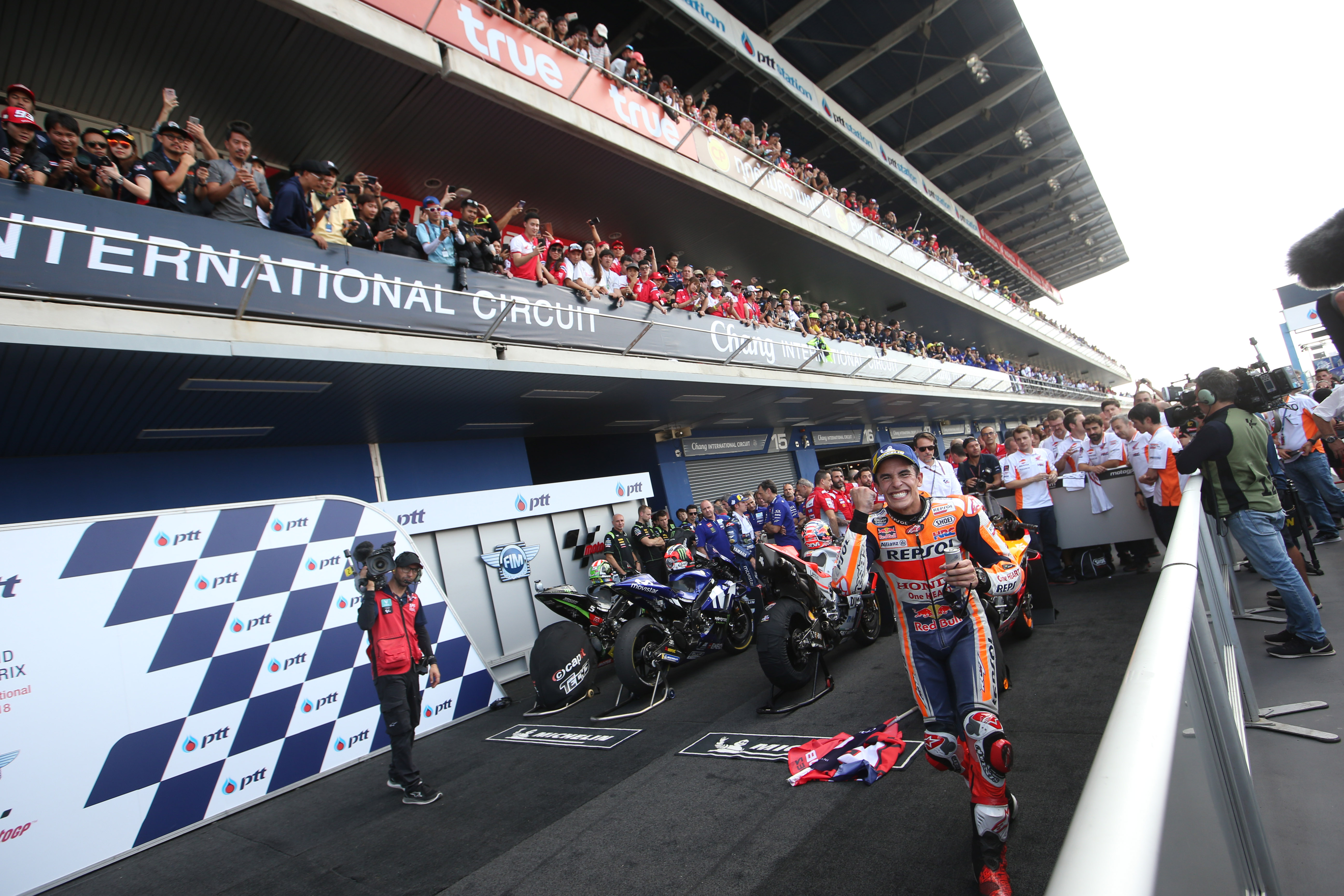
Marc Márquez at Chang International Circuit

== Human achievement index 2022 ==
Health	Education	Employment	Income
60	52	75	69
Housing	Family	Transport	Participation
31	48	17	32
Province Buriram, with an HAI 2022 value of 0.6136 is "low", occupies place 72 in the ranking.

Since 2003, United Nations Development Programme (UNDP) in Thailand has tracked progress on human development at sub-national level with the Human achievement index (HAI), a composite index covering eight key areas. The National Economic and Social Development Board (NESDB) took over this task in 2017.

Rank	Classification
1 - 13	"high"
14 - 29	"somewhat high"
30 - 45	"average"
46 - 61	"somewhat low"
62 - 77	"low"

Map with provinces and HAI 2022 rankings

== Notable people ==
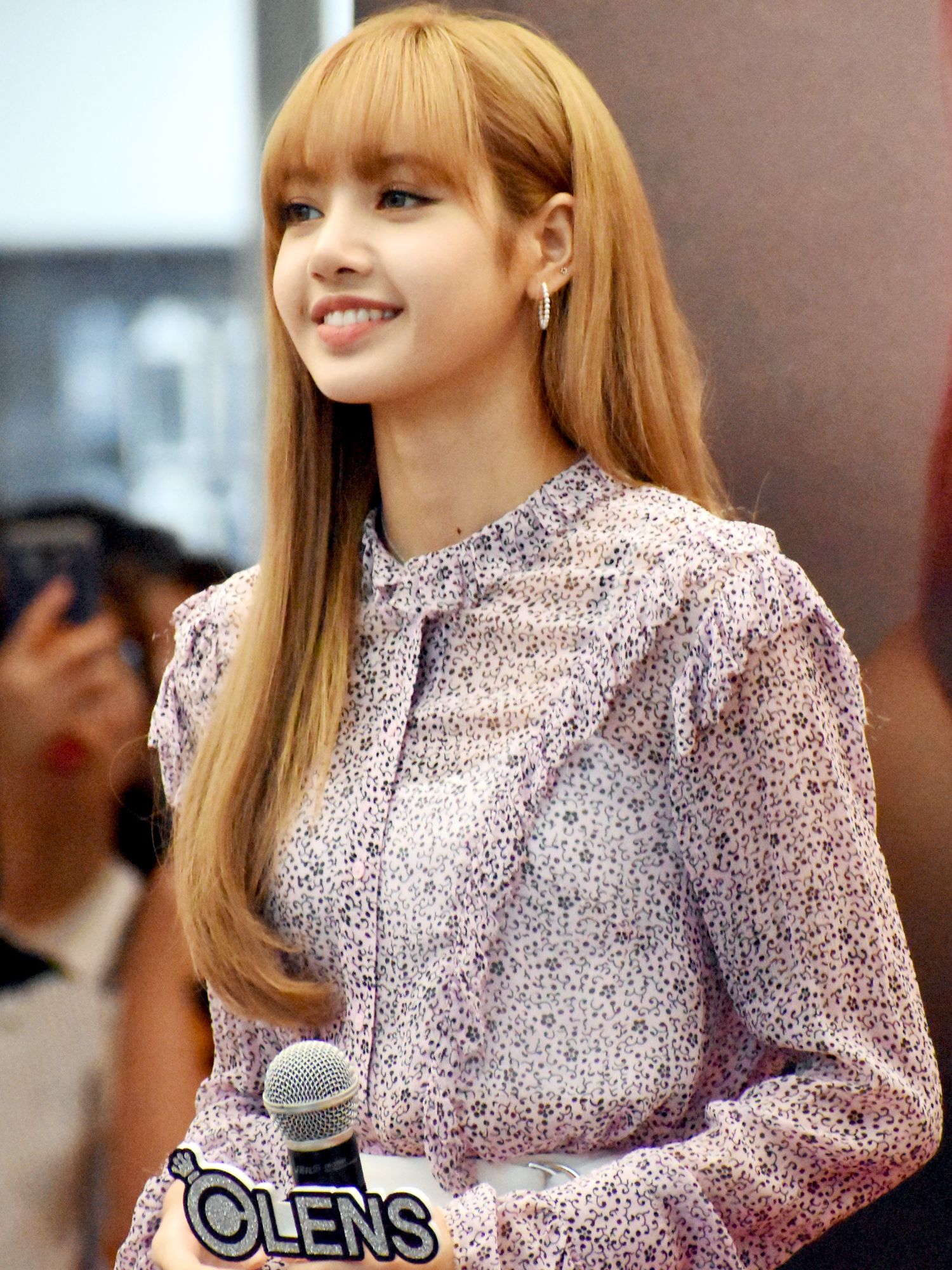
Lalisa Manoban is a Thai rapper born in Satuek district. She is well known as a member of South Korean girl group Blackpink.

- Pira Sudham (พีระ สุธรรม) (born 1942), writer, author of Monsoon Country
- Newin Chidchob (เนวิน ชิดชอบ) (born 1958), politician, chairman of Buriram United
- Samransak Muangsurin (สำราญศักดิ์ เมืองสุรินทร์) (born 1959), former Muay Thai fighter
- Burklerk Pinsinchai (เบิกฤกษ์ ปิ่นสินชัย) (born 1966), former Muay Thai fighter
- Coban Lookchaomaesaitong (โคบาล ลูกเจ้าแม่ไทรทอง) (born 1966), former Muay Thai fighter
- Changpuek Kiatsongrit (ช้างเผือก เกียรติทรงฤทธิ์) (born 1966), former Muay Thai fighter
- Saencherng Pinsinchai (แสนเชิง ปิ่นสินชัย) (born 1967), former Muay Thai fighter
- Namphon Nongkeepahuyuth (นำพล หนองกี่พาหุยุทธ) (1969–2016), late Muay Thai fighter
- Therdkiat Sitthepitak (เทอดเกียรติ ศิษย์เทพพิทักษ์) (born 1970), former Muay Thai fighter
- Namkabuan Nongkeepahuyuth (นำขบวน หนองกี่พาหุยุทธ) (1973–2017), late Muay Thai fighter
- Samkor Chor.Rathchatasupak (สามกอ ช.รัชตสุภัค) (born 1975), former Muay Thai fighter
- Sanong Chaiprakhom (สนอง ชัยประโคม) (born 1976), football player
- Kompayak Porpramook (คมพยัคฆ์ ป.ประมุข) (born 1982), former professional boxer
- Sam-A Gaiyanghadao (สามเอ ไก่ย่างห้าดาว) (born 1983), former Muay Thai fighter and professional boxer
- Panomroonglek Kratingdaenggym (พนมรุ้งเล็ก กระทิงแดงยิม) (born 1984), former Muay Thai fighter and professional boxer
- Teerachai Sithmorseng (ถิรชัย ศิษย์หมอเส็ง) (born 1992), professional boxer
- Sasalak Haiprakhon (ศศลักษณ์ ไหประโคน) (born 1996), footballer
- Lalisa Manobal (ลลิษา มโนบาล) (born 1997), a member of the South Korean girl group Blackpink
- Chatchu-on Moksri (ชัชชุอร โมกศรี) (born 1999), volleyball player
