= Farida Sulaiman =

Thai woman politician (born 1964)

- ฟาริดา สุไลมาน
- Born: January 26, 1964 (age 62); Surin Province, Thailand
- Occupation: Politician
- Spouse: Muk Sulaiman
- Children: Nasri; Fadil

Farida Sulaiman (Thai: ฟาริดา สุไลมาน; born January 26, 1964) is a former member of the House of Representatives of Surin Province and former deputy spokesperson for the Ministry of Social Development and Human Security. She is married to Muk Sulaiman.

== Early life ==
Sulaiman was born on January 26, 1964 in Charopat Subdistrict, Sikhoraphum district, Surin Province into a Muslim family, one of five families in Surin Province. Her father, Darun Prathan, is half-Pashtun and half-Khmer. Both her father and mother have served as local headmen. Sulaiman is married to Muk Sulaiman, a former member of the House of Representatives of Pattani Province. They have two children, Nasri and Fadil Sulaiman.

Sulaiman graduated from secondary school at Surawittayakarn School, then continued her studies at the bachelor's degree level in guidance psychology from Srinakharinwirot University, Prasarnmit Campus, graduated with a master's degree in guidance from Srinakharinwirot University, and a doctorate in regional development strategy from Surin Rajabhat University.

== Political work ==
Sulaiman began her political career as the mayor of Ra-Ngaeng Subdistrict, Sikhoraphum District, Surin Province. She later turned to national politics by running for election as a Member of Parliament for Surin Province and was elected three times under the Thai Rak Thai Party, the People's Power Party, and then moved to the Matubhum Party. Later, after the dissolution of Parliament on May 10, 2011, Sulaiman moved to the Bhumjaithai Party and ran for MP for Surin Province under the Bhumjaithai Party, which is a different party from the one run by her husband, Muk Sulaiman.

Sulaiman was previously appointed as an advisor to the Minister of Agriculture and Cooperatives and deputy spokesperson for the Ministry of Social Development and Human Security.

In 2021, Sulaiman moved to join the Thai Sang Thai Party, led by Khunying Sudarat Keyuraphan until the Thai Sang Thai Party held a press conference to introduce Ms. Farida as the party's candidate for MP, Constituency 5, Surin Province and signed the 2023 Election. but placed third in the voting.

=== Thai Airway incident ===
In 2008, Sulaiman and two other government officials were blocked by a Thai Airways captain from boarding a flight from Bangkok to Khon Kaen in order to return to Surin Province on Thai Airways flight TG1040 Bangkok-Khon Kaen. But as she walked to the plane door, a man dressed like the captain of the plane blocked her and asked if she was a member of parliament (MP) from the People's Power Party. He said that Thai Airways did not welcome MPs from the People's Power Party. The pilot was temporarily suspended.

== In media ==
- 2015 - Sulaiman, Farida (2015). ผู้หญิงสองวัฒนธรรม บนเส้นทางชีวิตการเมือง [Women of Two Cultures on the Path of Political Life]. Pattani: Al-Fathoni Foundation. ISBN 9786163942616.
- 2014 - hostess, Wanita Variety (รายการ) program on TMTV (Muslim TV channel, ช่องทีวีมุสลิม)

== Insignia ==
- 2011 – Order of the White Elephant, Highest Class, Knight Grand Cordon (KGE)
- 2008 – Order of the Crown of Thailand, Highest Class, The Most Exalted Order of the Crown of Thailand (M.W.M.)
