= Mueang Chan district =

Mueang Chan เมืองจันทร์
- District
- District location in Sisaket province
- Coordinates: 15°11′30″N 104°3′12″E
- Country: Thailand
- Province: Sisaket
- Seat: Mueang Chan

Area
  - Total: 95.830 km^{2} (37.000 sq mi)

Population (2005)
  - Total: 17,861
  - Density: 186.4/km^{2} (483/sq mi)
- Time zone: UTC+7 (ICT)
- Postal code: 33120
- Geocode: 3318

Mueang Chan (Thai: เมืองจันทร์, pronounced [mɯ̄a̯ŋ t͡ɕān]) is a district (amphoe) of Sisaket province, northeastern Thailand.

== History ==
The minor district (king amphoe) was created on 1 April 1992, when three tambons were split off from the Uthumphon Phisai district. It was upgraded to a full district on 11 October 1997.

== Geography ==
Neighboring districts are (from the north clockwise): Pho Si Suwan, Uthumphon Phisai, and Huai Thap Than of Sisaket Province; Samrong Thap, Non Narai, and Rattanaburi of Surin province.

== Administration ==
The district is divided into three sub-districts (tambon), which are further subdivided into 52 villages (mubans). There are no municipal (thesaban) areas. There are three tambon administrative organizations (TAO).

No.	Name	Thai name	Villages	Pop.
1.	Mueang Chan	เมืองจันทร์	25	7,702
2.	Thakon	ตาโกน	15	6,133
3.	Nong Yai	หนองใหญ่	12	4,026
