= Huai Thap Than district =

Huai Thap Than ห้วยทับทัน
- District
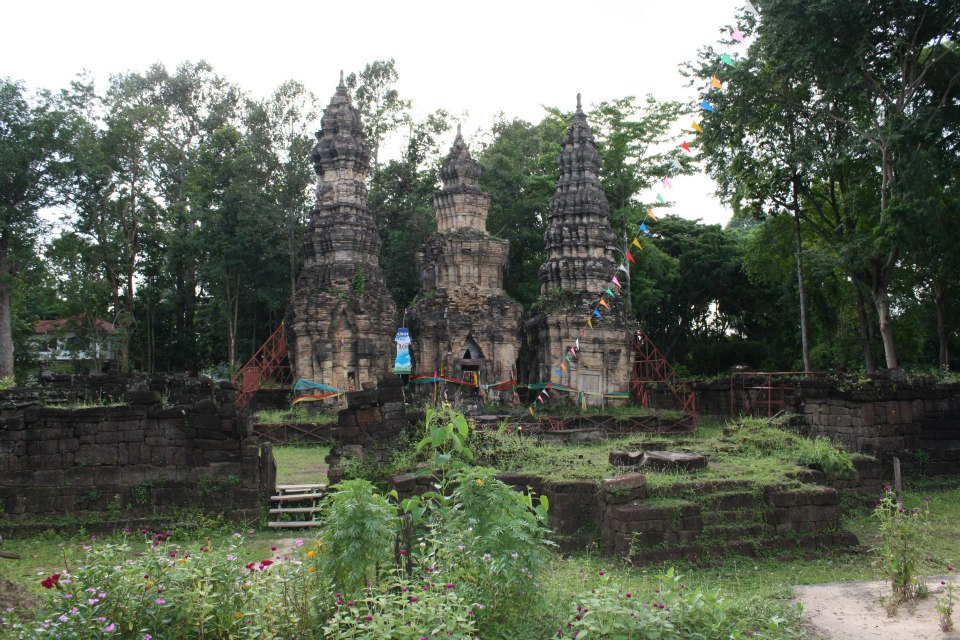
- Prasat Huai Thap Than, a local historic site

- District location in Sisaket province
- Coordinates: 15°3′0″N 104°1′24″E
- Country: Thailand
- Province: Sisaket
- Seat: Huai Thap Than

Area
  - Total: 194.6 km^{2} (75.1 sq mi)

Population (2005)
  - Total: 41,132
  - Density: 211.4/km^{2} (548/sq mi)
- Time zone: UTC+7 (ICT)
- Postal code: 33210
- Geocode: 3312

Huai Thap Than (Thai: ห้วยทับทัน, pronounced [hûa̯j tʰáp tʰān]) is a district (amphoe) in the western part of Sisaket province, northeastern Thailand.

== Geography ==
Neighboring districts are (from the north clockwise): Mueang Chan, Uthumphon Phisai, and Prang Ku of Sisaket Province, and Samrong Thap of Surin province.

== History ==
The minor district (king amphoe) Haui Thap Than was established on 17 January 1977, when the four tambons, Huai Thap Than, Mueang Luang, Phak Mai, and Kluai Kwang, were split off from Uthumphon Phisai district. It started operations on 16 February with a temporary district office in temple (Wat) Phra Charangsan, which was replaced by a permanent office building in 1981. It was upgraded to a full district on 20 March 1986.

== Administration ==
The district is divided into six sub-districts (tambons), which are further subdivided into 80 villages (mubans). Huai Thap Than is a township (thesaban tambon) which covers parts of tambon Huai Thap Than. There are a further six tambon administrative organizations (TAO).

No.	Name	Thai name	Villages	Pop.
1.	Huai Thap Than	ห้วยทับทัน	8	5,753
2.	Mueang Luang	เมืองหลวง	14	8,508
3.	Kluai Kwang	กล้วยกว้าง	13	5,678
4.	Phak Mai	ผักไหม	16	6,951
5.	Chan Saen Chai	จานแสนไชย	13	7,074
6.	Prasat	ปราสาท	16	7,168

== Huai Thap Than grilled chicken ==
Huai Thap Than grilled chicken or Mai Madan grilled chicken is a chicken dish from the Huai Thap Than district. It is unique and delicacy local food and is famous all over. Its history began around 1937, when Huai Thap Than was a big station for locomotives. They had here to stop to get more woods for steam engine. This is because the train had to stop for a long time, the staffs would go to the forest and get red junglefowl. When they needed to grill the chicken they had to tie the chicken with some pieces of wood. Madan (Garcinia schomburgkiana) woods could be easily found but it turned out that it gave better scent and taste to their grilled chicken. It was first sold at Huai Thap Than railway station until it became unique and famous until now. Chicken grilled with madan sticks has a fragrant aroma and a slightly sour taste. The meat is dry, unlike the famous grilled chicken of other regions.
