= Surin, Thailand =

Surin สุรินทร์ (Thai) ซเร็น (Northern Khmer)
- Town
- เทศบาลเมืองสุรินทร์
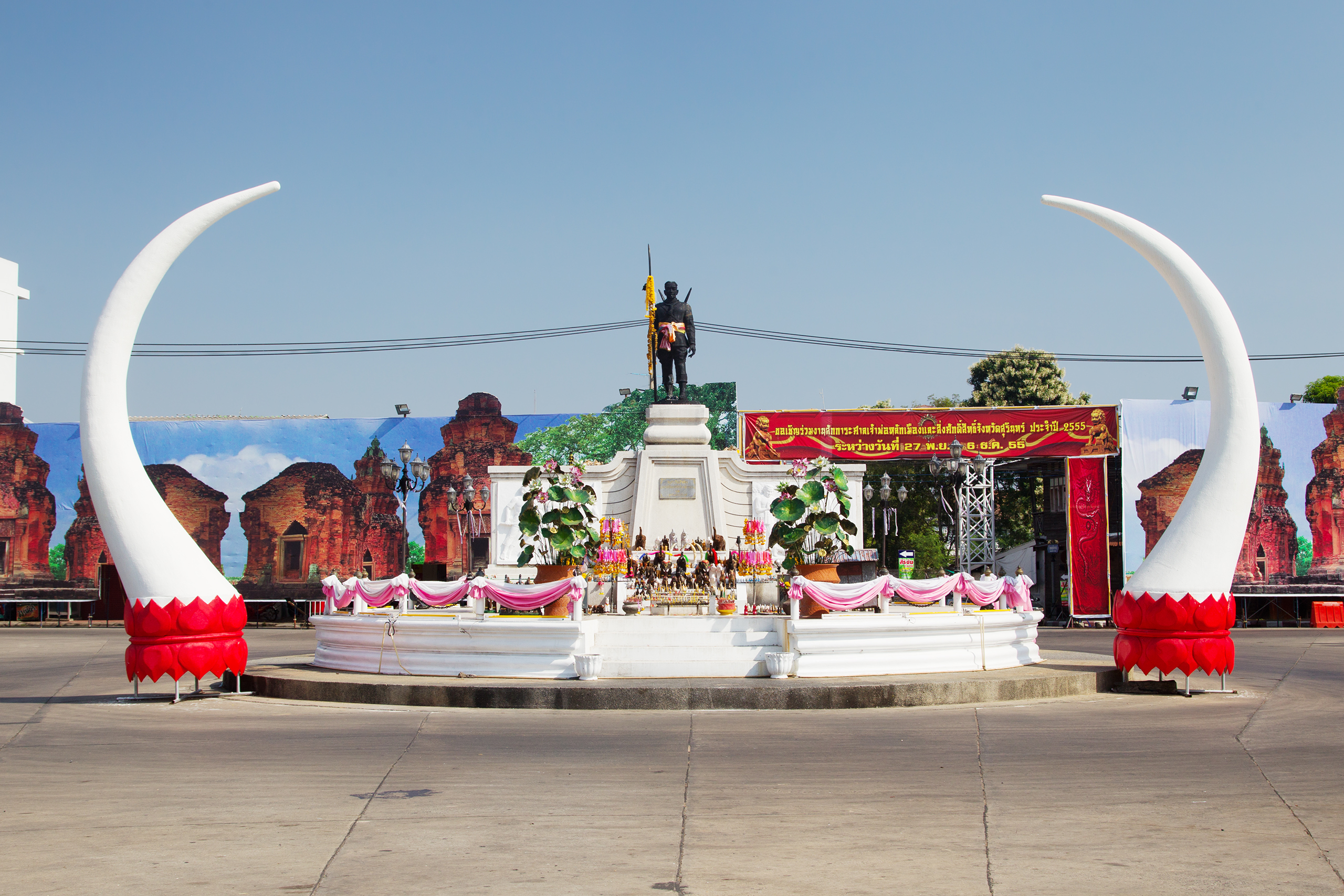
- The Monument of Phaya Surin Phakdi Si Narong Changwang

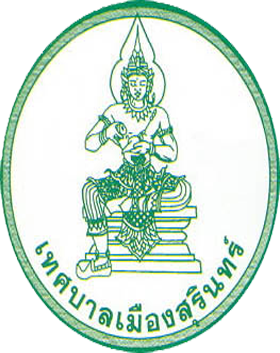
- Seal

- Location in Thailand
- Coordinates: 14°53′6″N 103°29′16.8″E
- Country: Thailand
- Province: Surin
- District: Mueang Surin

Government
  - Mayor: Wattaning Tangteewisit

Area
  - Total: 11.39 km^{2} (4.40 sq mi)
- Elevation: 150 m (490 ft)

Population (2000)
  - Total: 39,179 (est)
- Time zone: UTC+7 (ICT)
- Area code: (+66) 44
- Website: www.mosurin.go.th

Surin (Thai: สุรินทร์, pronounced [sù.rīn]; Northern Khmer: ซเร็น, pronounced [sren]) is a town in Thailand, capital of Surin province, 431 km east-northeast of Bangkok. It is the site of the annual Surin Elephant Round-up. As of 2019, Surin has an estimated population of 39,179.

== Etymology ==
The first part of the name Sur- originates from the Sanskrit word Sura (Devanagari: सुर) meaning "God" (cf. Asura), and the second part -in(thara) from Sanskrit is "Indra" (Devanagari: इन्द्र). Hence the name of the province literally means Lord Indra.

== Geography ==
In the north of the province is the valley of the Mun river, a tributary of the Mekong. To the south of the province is the Dongrek mountain chain, which also forms the boundary to Cambodia. The central and northern parts of the province are undulating flood plains.

== Climate ==
Surin has a tropical savanna climate (Köppen climate classification Aw). Winters are dry and warm. Temperatures rise until April, with the average daily maximum at 35.9 °C (96.6 °F). The monsoon season runs from late April through early October, with heavy rain and somewhat cooler temperatures during the day, although nights remain warm.

Climate data for Surin (1991–2020, extremes 1951-present)
Month	Jan	Feb	Mar	Apr	May	Jun	Jul	Aug	Sep	Oct	Nov	Dec	Year
Record high °C (°F)	37.0 (98.6)	38.9 (102.0)	40.8 (105.4)	43.5 (110.3)	42.3 (108.1)	39.6 (103.3)	38.2 (100.8)	36.9 (98.4)	35.7 (96.3)	35.1 (95.2)	36.6 (97.9)	34.8 (94.6)	43.5 (110.3)
Mean daily maximum °C (°F)	31.3 (88.3)	33.4 (92.1)	35.4 (95.7)	36.1 (97.0)	34.9 (94.8)	33.8 (92.8)	32.8 (91.0)	32.4 (90.3)	31.8 (89.2)	31.3 (88.3)	31.3 (88.3)	30.3 (86.5)	32.9 (91.2)
Daily mean °C (°F)	24.5 (76.1)	26.5 (79.7)	28.9 (84.0)	29.9 (85.8)	29.2 (84.6)	28.6 (83.5)	28.0 (82.4)	27.7 (81.9)	27.4 (81.3)	26.8 (80.2)	25.8 (78.4)	24.2 (75.6)	27.3 (81.1)
Mean daily minimum °C (°F)	18.5 (65.3)	20.4 (68.7)	23.3 (73.9)	24.9 (76.8)	25.2 (77.4)	25.0 (77.0)	24.6 (76.3)	24.5 (76.1)	24.3 (75.7)	23.2 (73.8)	21.0 (69.8)	18.7 (65.7)	22.8 (73.0)
Record low °C (°F)	6.4 (43.5)	8.0 (46.4)	12.0 (53.6)	15.6 (60.1)	18.3 (64.9)	21.5 (70.7)	21.0 (69.8)	21.0 (69.8)	20.8 (69.4)	16.5 (61.7)	11.9 (53.4)	8.2 (46.8)	6.4 (43.5)
Average precipitation mm (inches)	6.6 (0.26)	9.9 (0.39)	47.2 (1.86)	85.9 (3.38)	186.4 (7.34)	194.1 (7.64)	219.9 (8.66)	270.7 (10.66)	266.5 (10.49)	113.5 (4.47)	29.7 (1.17)	3.0 (0.12)	1,433.4 (56.43)
Average precipitation days (≥ 1.0 mm)	0.7	1.3	3.0	6.3	11.3	12.7	14.6	15.5	14.8	8.1	2.6	0.4	91.3
Average relative humidity (%)	64.9	62.3	62.5	66.4	74.8	77.7	79.5	81.7	83.7	79.5	71.8	66.7	72.6
Mean monthly sunshine hours	263.5	245.8	238.7	204.0	155.0	153.0	117.8	117.8	144.0	182.9	219.0	260.4	2,301.9
Mean daily sunshine hours	8.5	8.7	7.7	6.8	5.0	5.1	3.8	3.8	4.8	5.9	7.3	8.4	6.3
Source 1: World Meteorological Organization
Source 2: Office of Water Management and Hydrology, Royal Irrigation Department (sun 1981–2010)(extremes)

== History ==
=== Prehistory ===
The earliest settlers in this region were hunter-gatherers. The Neolithic, with the introduction of agriculture, dates from 2,500 to 1,500 years BCE. The Bronze Age dates from 1,500–500 BCE and the Iron Age from 500 BCE to 500 CE. It is in the Iron Age that the first evidence of human settlement emerges in the province, with approximately sixty known Iron Age sites.

=== Historical period ===
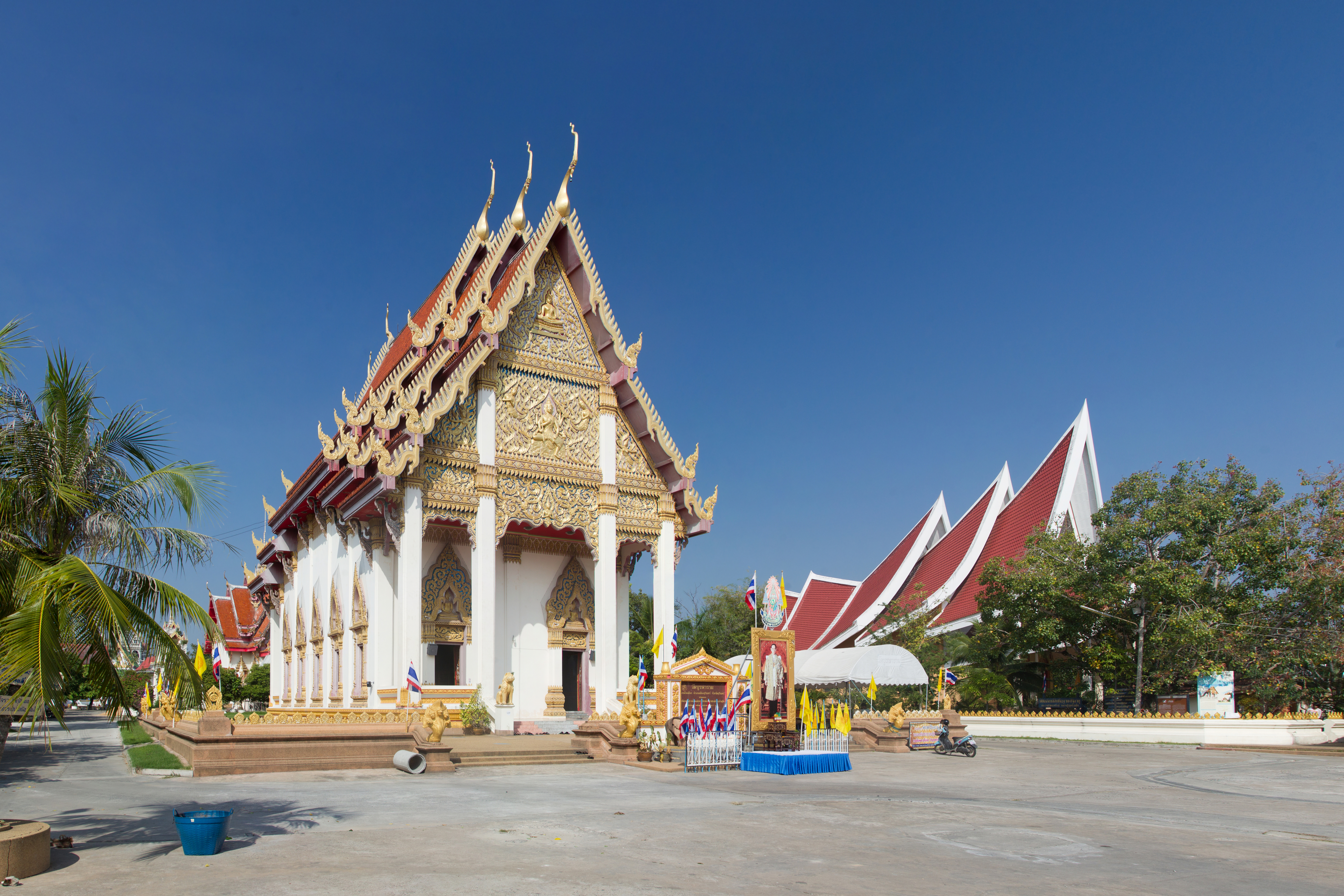
Wat Burapharam

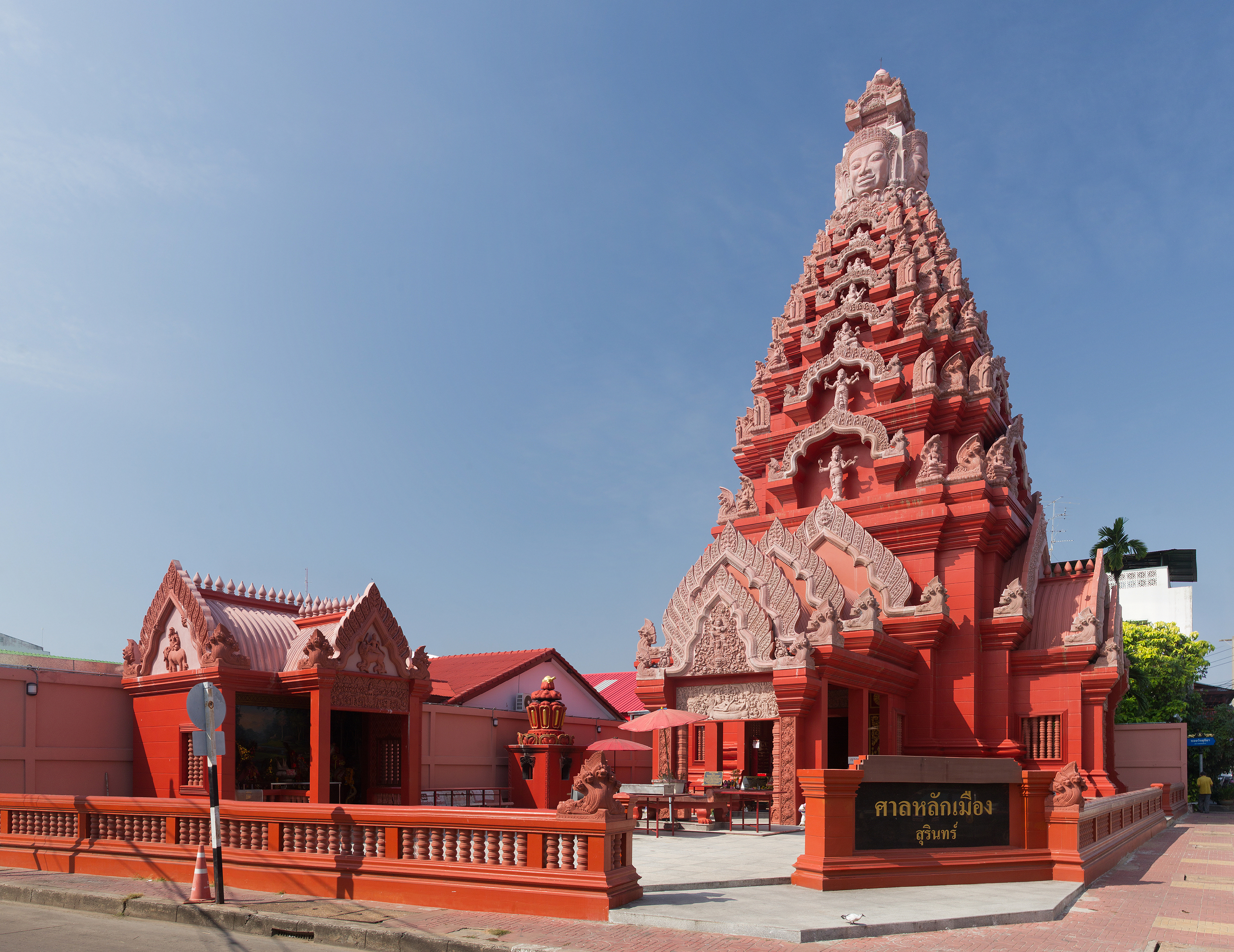
City Pillar Shrine

The earliest known historical period is the Dvaravati. This was an Indian-based culture that diffused through the north-east region of what is now Thailand. Evidence of this culture is found in the Surin region, dating from the 7th to the 11th centuries CE. It was in this period that Buddhism became the dominant religion of the region.

Following the Dvaravati period, the powerful Khmer Empire expanded its influence throughout what is now the southern Isan region of Thailand. This period covers the 7th to 13th centuries CE. Surin was an important part of the ancient Khmer empire. Temple ruins and a substantial ethnic Khmer minority remain part of Surin. Khmer stone inscriptions date from c. 600 CE. Over the next several centuries, a growing number of Khmer sites were constructed in the province, most notably Prasat Sikhoraphum. These sites would have formed part of the network of Khmer infrastructure centred on Prasat Phanom Rung.

With the collapse of the Khmer Empire in the 13th century, Surin province faded from history. It was in the 18th century that it re-emerges. At this time, a Kuay local leader named Chiangpum became the royally appointed ruler of the region. According to legend, he presented a rare white elephant to Chao Phaya Chakri, future King Rama I. In gratitude, Chiangpum was awarded the royal title Luang Surin Phakdi and appointed the village headman. When Rama I became the Thai monarch, he appointed Luang Surin Phakdi as the province's governor. In 1763, the village was moved to the location of the modern city of Surin, and was upgraded to a city with the name Muang Prathai Saman. There is a local legend that this move was due to better water supplies at the new site. The original location of the town was at Muang Thi, approximately 15 kilometres (9.3 mi) to the east of the modern city. In 1786, the city's name was changed to Surin in honor of its governor.

The province slowly grew in population; there was a continual influx of people from surrounding areas, principally Cambodia (part of what is now western Cambodia was ruled by Bangkok at this time). Surin was largely self-sufficient, and somewhat isolated. This changed with the advent of the railroad in 1922. Chinese and Indian merchants settled, and its manufacturing increased.

== Transportation ==
The town is served by Surin Airport, which as of 2021, lacked any commercial-passenger or cargo airline services. Buriram Airport is nearby and with two passenger airlines serving it, it is the closest airport with airline services.

== See also ==
- Surin Province
- Mueang Surin District
