= Ba, Tha Tum =

Subdistrict in Surin Province

Ba ตำบลบะ
- Subdistrict
- Motto: รักสามัคคี มากมีนักปราชญ์ ปราสาทโบราณ สืบสานวัฒนธรรม เกษตรล้ำหน้า ชาวประชาเป็นสุข
- Country: Thailand
- Province: Surin
- District: Tha Tum

Government
  - Type: Subdistrict Administrative Organization (SAO)
  - Head of SAO: Under election

Population (2026)
  - Total: 4,013
- Time zone: UTC+7 (ICT)

Ba (Thai: ตำบลบะ, pronounced [bá]) is a tambon (subdistrict) of Tha Tum District, in Surin province, Thailand. In 2026, it had a population of 4,013 people.

== History ==
Ba became a subdistrict in 1994 by the Act of parliament of Thailand.

== Administration ==
=== Central administration ===
The tambon is divided into fifteen administrative villages (mubans).

No.	Name	Thai	Population
1.	Ba	บะ	598
2.	Nong Takhai	หนองตาไก้	245
3.	Khok Sa-at	โคกสะอาด	259
4.	Pueai Prasat	เปือยปราสาท	139
5.	Non Sung	โนนสูง	496
6.	Pang Gao	ผางเก่า	187
7.	Samroang	สำโรง	117
8.	Chaneang	เฉนียง	403
9.	Ta Phek	ตาเป็ก	127
10.	Preang	ปรีง	271
11.	Preang	ปรีง	483
12.	Nong Phai	หนองไผ่	241
13.	Yang Gao	ยางเก่า	130
14.	Nong Sim	หนองสิม	102
15.	Preang	ปรีง	215
