= Prasat Sikhoraphum =

Sikhoraphum
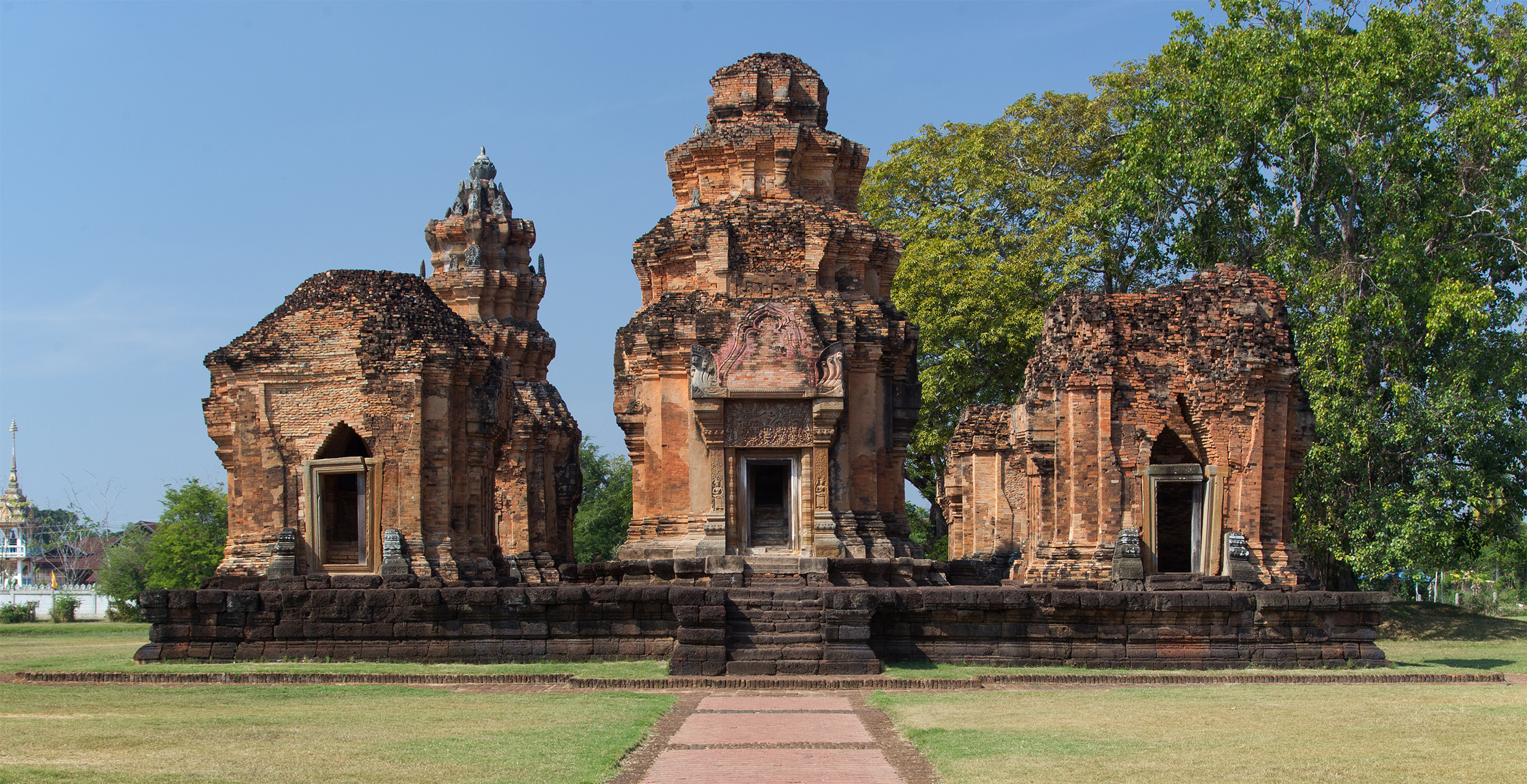

- Location in Thailand

Religion
- Affiliation: Hinduism
- Province: Surin

Location
- Location: Sikhoraphum, Amphoe Sikhoraphum
- Country: Thailand
- Interactive map of Sikhoraphum
- Coordinates: 14°56′44″N 103°47′56″E

Architecture
- Type: Khmer
- Creator: Suryavarman II
- Completed: 12th century

Prasat Sikhoraphum (Thai: ปราสาทศีขรภูมิ) is a Khmer temple located in Thailand, located between the cities of Surin and Sisaket. It was built in the 12th century by King Suryavararas, devatas and dvarapalas. The temple was converted for use by Buddhists in the 16th century. Architectural contributions influenced by Laos are evident on the tower roofs. The name comes from the Sanskrit word of South India shikhara, meaning tower sanctuary.

== Gallery ==
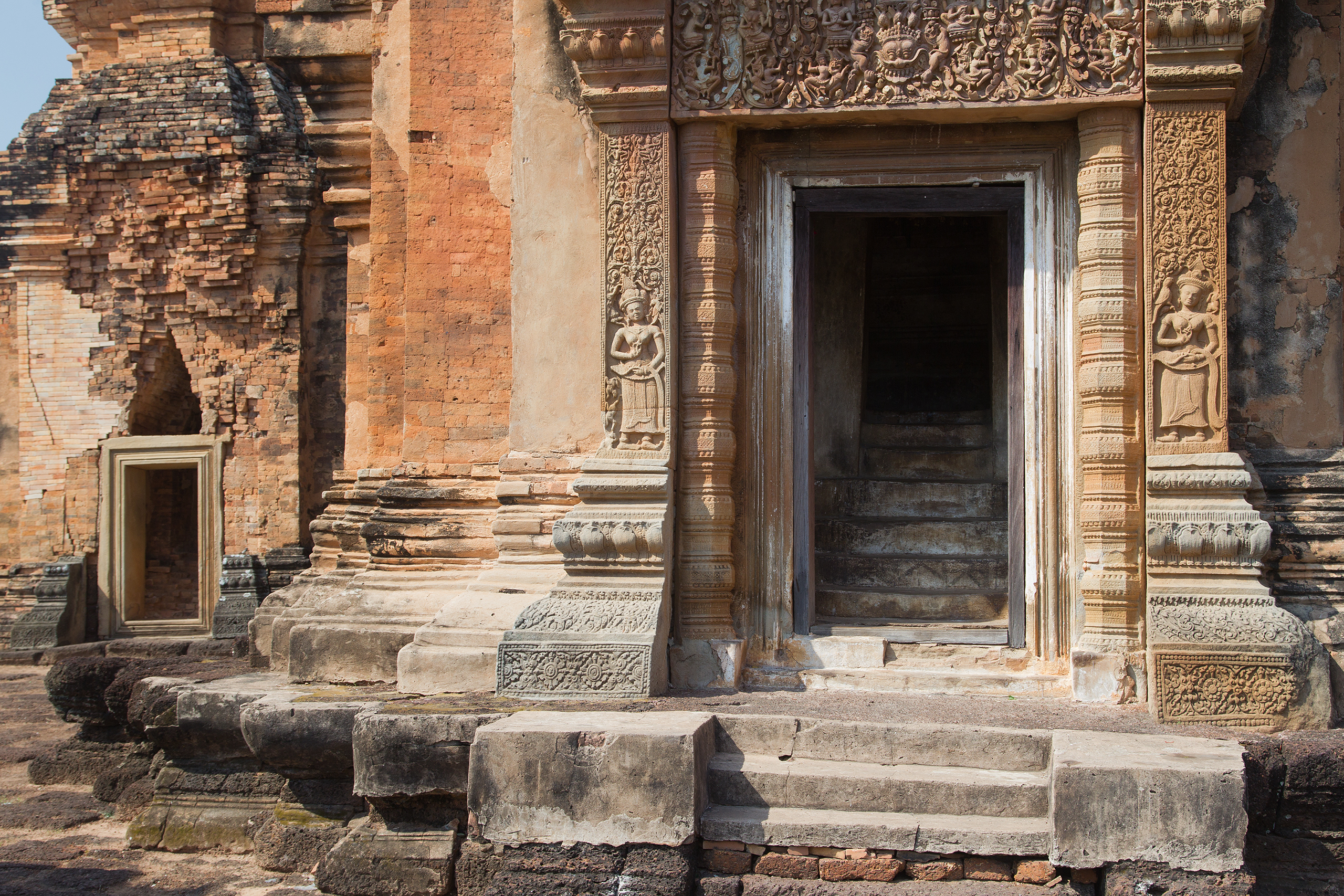

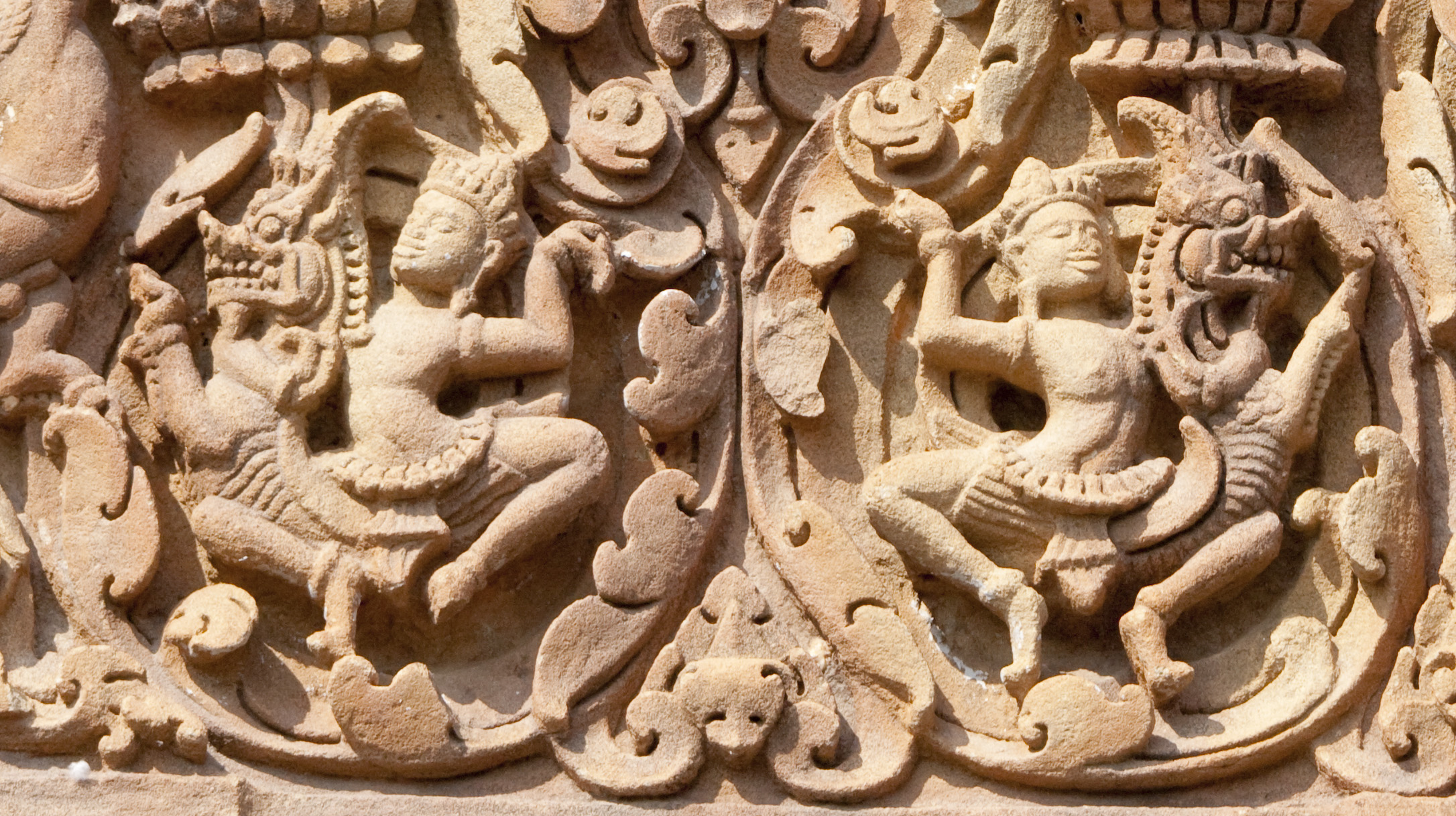

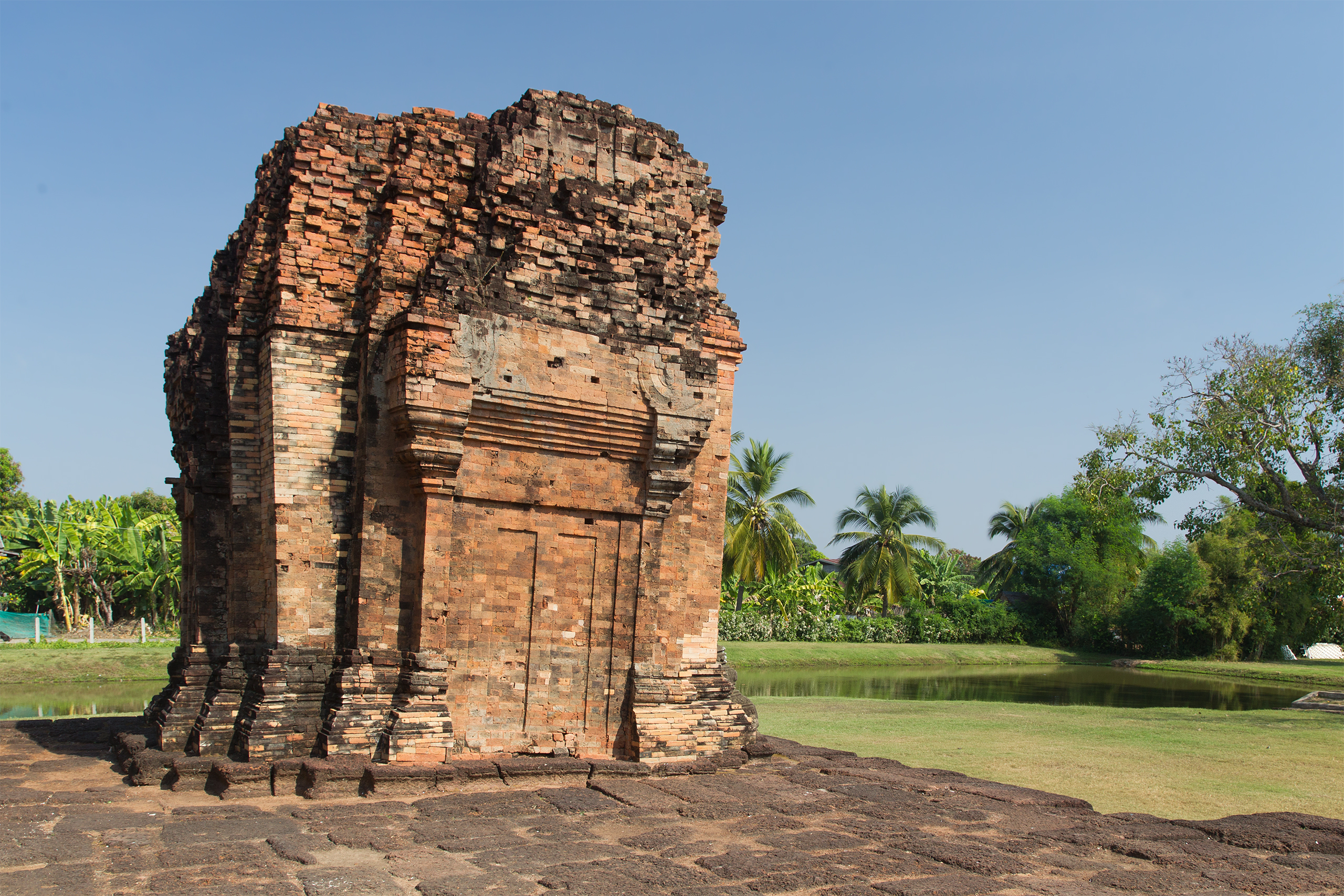

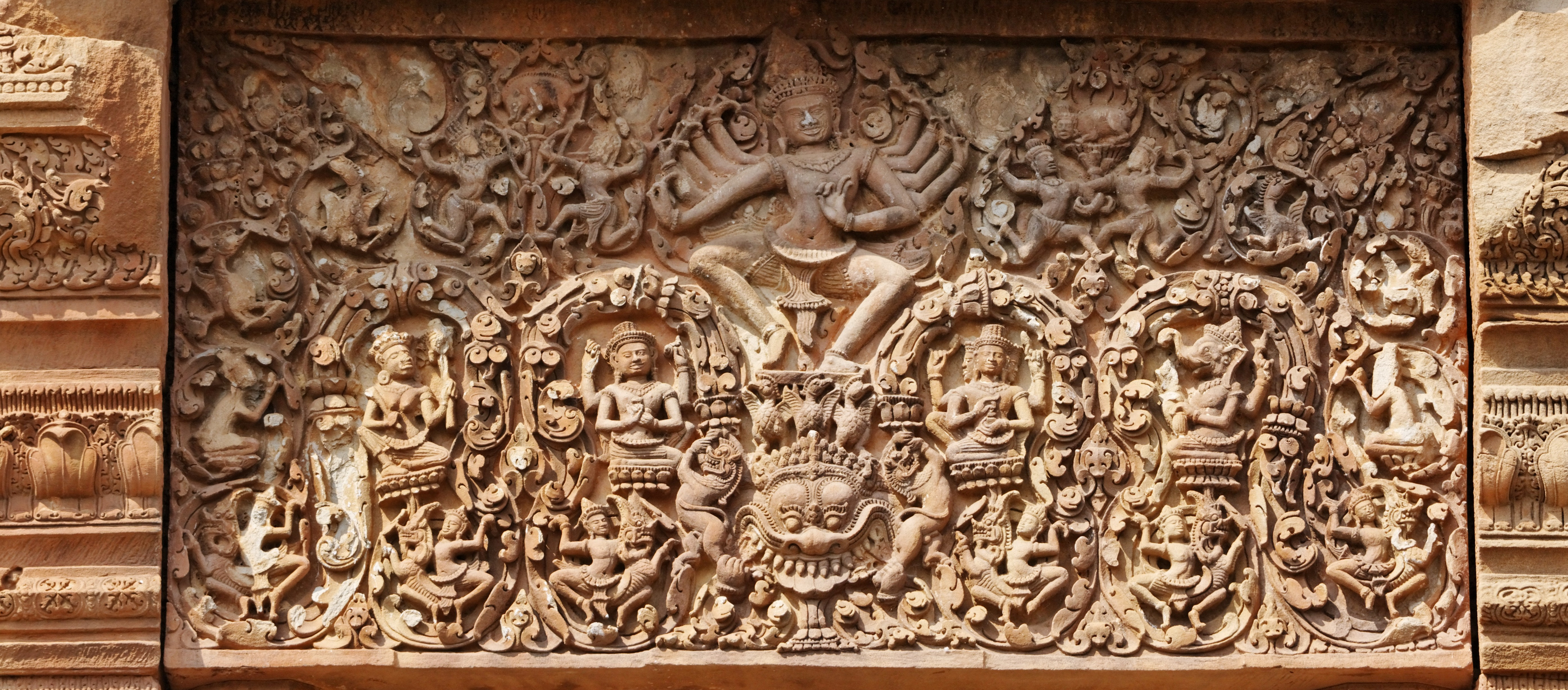
