= Prasat Huai Thap Than =

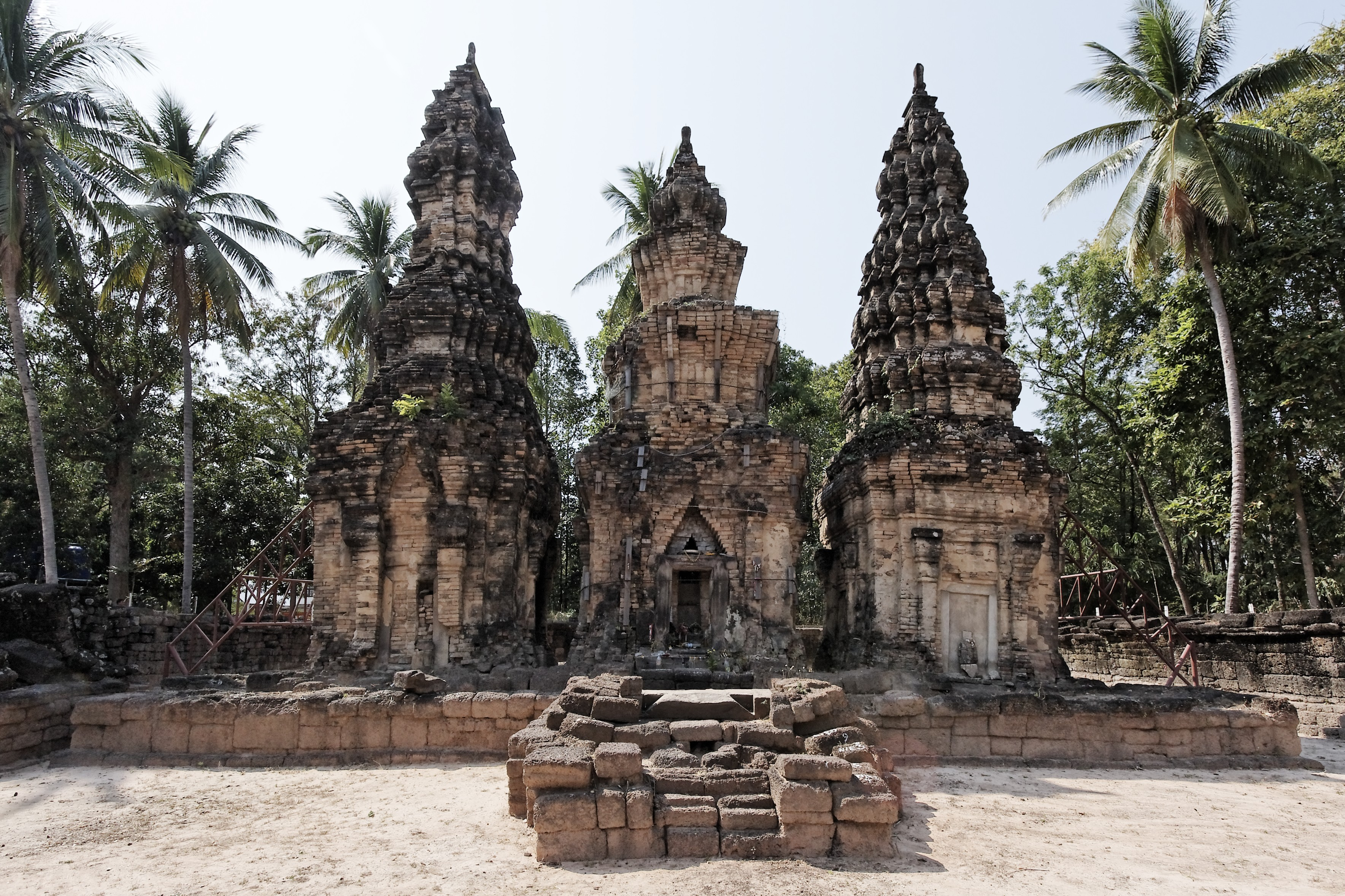

- Location in Thailand

Religion
- Affiliation: Hinduism
- District: Huai Thap Than
- Province: Sisaket
- Deity: Trimurti

Location
- Location: 256 Moo 12 Prasat rd, Huai Thap Than, Sisaket
- Country: Thailand
- Interactive map of Prasat Huai Thap Than
- Coordinates: 15.195278°N 102.176753°E

Architecture
- Type: Khmer & Lao
- Completed: 18th–19th centuries

Prasat Huai Thap Than (Thai: ปราสาทห้วยทับทัน, pronounced [prāː.sàːt hûa̯j tʰáp tʰān]) is a small ruined building located in Prasat subdistrict, Huai Thap Than district, Sisaket province, northeast Thailand.

== Details ==
It is situated in the compound of Wat Prasat Phanaram temple, about 47 km (29.2 mi) southwest of downtown Sisaket. It was discovered and registered as national remain in 1935.

It is also known as Prasat Ban Prasat (ปราสาทบ้านปราสาท, pronounced [prāː.sàːt bâːn prāː.sàːt]) or Prasat Noenthat (ปราสาทเนินธาตุ, pronounced [prāː.sàːt nɤ̄ːn tʰâːt]). The reason it has many names is because it is normal practice in Isan (northeast region) they always this type of construction (Khmer Hindu temple) as Prasat Ban Prasat. Somehow, the restoration of such construction changed its look so they called it That Chedi (ธาตุเจดีย์, pronounced [tʰâːt t͡ɕēː.dīː], "pagoda containing Buddhist relics") or just called Noen That. Later, when more constructions were found so in order to make it clear which one it is referring to its location such as the one here is called Prasat Huai Thap Than.

Prasat Huai Thap Than was built during Baphuon period (around the mid-11th century) in ancient Khmer civilization. Later, around the 18th–19th centuries, Lan Xang Kingdom became more influence so the top of the construction changed and changed its name to That Chedi. The religious belief changed too from Hinduism or Brahmanism that involved with Trimurti, which are Shiva, Vishnu and Brahma. That is way three chedis were always built.

In Lan Xang civilization, the top of the chedi changed its look to something more like a Phra That (śarīra) as its the Buddhism's belief.

When it was first built, the construction concerned on the direction of building so all temple faced to the east and surrounded with wall. Therefore, three buildings were built on the same foundation. The main building in the middle with two more buildings on its left and right side. This kind of formation of Trimurti. Ancient remains and religious related constructions changed their function during the time.

Currently, the building doors on both sides are closed. The sandstone door frame proved that there was a door there, and only the main building that is allowed to go inside. The bricks on the construction are new and old bricks.
