= Khwao Sinarin district =

Khwao Sinarin เขวาสินรินทร์
- District
- District location in Surin province
- Coordinates: 15°0′8″N 103°35′47″E
- Country: Thailand
- Province: Surin
- Seat: Khwao Sinarin

Area
  - Total: 189.7 km^{2} (73.2 sq mi)

Population (2005)
  - Total: 35,394
  - Density: 186.6/km^{2} (483/sq mi)
- Time zone: UTC+7 (ICT)
- Postal code: 32000
- Geocode: 3216

Khwao Sinarin (Thai: เขวาสินรินทร์, pronounced [kʰwǎw sìʔ.náʔ.rīn], also locally [kʰwǎw sǐn.nā.rīn]) is a district (amphoe) of Surin province, northeastern Thailand.

== History ==
The minor district (king amphoe) was established on 15 July 1996 with area split from Mueang Surin district.

On 15 May 2007, all 81 minor districts were upgraded to full districts. On 24 August the upgrade became official.

== Geography ==
Neighboring districts are (from the north clockwise): Chom Phra, Sikhoraphum and Mueang Surin.

== Administration ==
The district is divided into five sub-districts (tambons), which are further subdivided into 58 villages (mubans). There are no municipal (thesaban) areas. There are five tambon administrative organizations (TAO).

No.	Name	Thai name	Villages	Pop.
1.	Khwao Sinarin	เขวาสินรินทร์	11	10,466
2.	Bueng	บึง	11	4,706
3.	Ta Kuk	ตากูก	10	7,156
4.	Prasat Thong	ปราสาททอง	13	6,543
5.	Ban Rae	บ้านแร่	13	6,437
