= Samrong Thap district =

Samrong Thap สำโรงทาบ
- District
- District location in Surin province
- Coordinates: 15°1′21″N 103°56′10″E
- Country: Thailand
- Province: Surin

Area
  - Total: 375.2 km^{2} (144.9 sq mi)

Population (2005)
  - Total: 52,459
  - Density: 139.8/km^{2} (362/sq mi)
- Time zone: UTC+7 (ICT)
- Postal code: 32170
- Geocode: 3212

Samrong Thap (Thai: สำโรงทาบ, pronounced [sǎm.rōːŋ tʰâːp]) is a district (amphoe) in the eastern part of Surin province, northeastern Thailand.

== History ==
The minor district (king amphoe) Samrong Thap was established on 1 September 1958. It was upgraded to a full district on 11 December 1959.

== Geography ==
Neighboring districts are (from the southwest clockwise): Sikhoraphum, Sanom and Non Narai of Surin Province; Mueang Chan, Huai Thap Than and Prang Ku of Sisaket province.

== Administration ==
The district is divided into 10 sub-districts (tambons), which are further subdivided into 100 villages (mubans). Samrong Thap is a township (thesaban tambon) which covers parts of tambons Samrong Thap and Nong Phai Lom. There are a further 10 tambon administrative organizations (TAO).

No.	Name	Thai name	Villages	Pop.
1.	Samrong Thap	สำโรงทาบ	12	6,900
2.	Nong Phai Lom	หนองไผ่ล้อม	13	9,538
3.	Kra-om	กระออม	9	4,780
4.	Nong Ha	หนองฮะ	11	4,939
5.	Si Suk	ศรีสุข	8	4,785
6.	Ko Kaeo	เกาะแก้ว	11	5,301
7.	Muen Si	หมื่นศรี	9	5,494
8.	Samet	เสม็จ	8	3,608
9.	Sano	สะโน	9	3,318
10.	Pradu	ประดู่	10	3,796

== Notable people ==
- Buakaw Banchamek – world-class kickboxer
