= Sanom district =

Sanom สนม
- District
- District location in Surin province
- Coordinates: 15°11′56″N 103°45′42″E
- Country: Thailand
- Province: Surin
- Seat: Sanom

Area
  - Total: 203.0 km^{2} (78.4 sq mi)

Population (2005)
  - Total: 45,268
  - Density: 223/km^{2} (580/sq mi)
- Time zone: UTC+7 (ICT)
- Postal code: 32160
- Geocode: 3208

Sanom (Thai: สนม, pronounced [sā.nǒm]) is a district (amphoe) in the northern part of Surin province, northeastern Thailand.

== History ==
The original name of the main town was Ban Nong Sanom (บ้านหนองสนม), which was a village under Mueang Surin. In 1893 it was reassigned to Mueang Rattanaburi, the present-day Rattanaburi district.

The minor district (king amphoe) Sanom was established on 1 July 1971, when the five tambons Sanom, Khaen, Na Nuan, Nong Rakhang, and Phon Ko were split off from Rattanaburi District. It was upgraded to a full district on 12 April 1977.

== Geography ==
Neighboring districts are (from the north clockwise): Rattanaburi, Non Narai, Samrong Thap, Sikhoraphum, Chom Phra and Tha Tum.

== Administration ==
The district is divided into seven sub-districts (tambons), which are further subdivided into 78 villages (mubans). Sanom is a township (thesaban tambon) which covers parts of tambon Sanom. There are a further seven tambon administrative organizations (TAO).

No.	Name	Thai name	Villages	Pop.
1.	Sanom	สนม	12	9,272
2.	Phon Ko	โพนโก	12	7,341
3.	Nong Rakhang	หนองระฆัง	8	4,489
4.	Na Nuan	นานวน	13	5,989
5.	Khaen	แคน	14	9,063
6.	Hua Ngua	หัวงัว	8	4,365
7.	Nong I Yo	หนองอียอ	11	4,749
