= Tha Tum district =

Tha Tum ท่าตูม
- District
- District location in Surin province
- Coordinates: 15°29′N 103°48′E
- Country: Thailand
- Province: Surin

Area
  - Total: 643.3 km^{2} (248.4 sq mi)

Population (2005)
  - Total: 97,390
  - Density: 151.4/km^{2} (392/sq mi)
- Time zone: UTC+7 (ICT)
- Postal code: 32120
- Geocode: 3203

Tha Tum (Thai: ท่าตูม, pronounced [tʰâː tūːm]) is a district (amphoe) in the northern part of Surin province, northeastern Thailand. The district is located along the Mun River, which has historically served as an important waterway and agricultural lifeline.

== Geography ==
Neighboring districts are (from the east clockwise): Rattanaburi, Sanom and Chom Phra of Surin Province; Satuek of Buriram province; Chumphon Buri of Surin; Kaset Wisai and Suwannaphum of Roi Et province.

== History ==
During the reign of Rama V, the area of present-day Tha Tum District was initially established as Udon Surin District, under the administration of Mueang Khukhan. In 1909 (B.E. 2452), the government recognized that Udon Surin District was located too far from Khukhan, creating difficulties for officials and residents in conducting administrative affairs. Consequently, it was reassigned under Mueang Surin and renamed Surapinikhom District in 1913 (B.E. 2456), with Luang Paeng serving as the first district officer.

Later in 1913 (B.E. 2456), Surapinikhom District was officially established along the banks of the Mun River at Ban Kampong Sway and completed in 1917 (B.E. 2460). Khun Surasit Sarakarn (Pin Charanyanon) was appointed as the first district officer. According to local tradition, when the municipal inspector visited the district office on a raft along the river, he accidentally fell into the water with a loud splash. Villagers began calling that spot "Tha Tum," meaning "the pier of a splash." Since the district office was located there, the name gradually became widely used, and the district eventually adopted it officially.

During the Pacific War (1945), the government ordered the district to construct an emergency airfield. The district cleared public land in Village 7, Tha Tum Subdistrict, for this purpose. After the war, the district committee decided to relocate the district office from the crowded original location in the town center to the area of the former airfield, which is the site of the present-day district office.

Significant administrative changes include:

- 12 October 1913 (B.E. 2456): Renamed Udon Surin District under Surin Province, Ubon Ratchathani to Surapinikhom District.
- 29 April 1917 (B.E. 2460): Renamed Surapinikhom District, Surin Province to Tha Tum District.
- 24 December 1922 (B.E. 2465): Transferred Tal Subdistrict from Tha Tum District to Si Khru Phum District.
- 28 February 1937 (B.E. 2480): Transferred Phrom Thep Subdistrict from Chumphon Buri District to Tha Tum District.
- 14 March 1937 (B.E. 2480): Downgraded Chumphon Buri District to a minor district and placed it under Tha Tum District, encompassing three subdistricts: Chumphon Buri, Phrai Khla, and Ya Wuek.
- Subsequent administrative adjustments occurred throughout the 20th century, including the creation, transfer, and elevation of various subdistricts and minor districts such as Chom Phra, Mueang Kae, Ba, Nong Bua, Nong Methi, and Thung Kula, as well as the establishment of sanitary districts (sukhaphiban) in Tha Tum and Chom Phra.
- 25 May 1999 (B.E. 2542): Tha Tum sanitary district was upgraded to Tha Tum Subdistrict Municipality.

== Administration ==
The district is divided into 10 sub-districts (tambons), which are further subdivided into 165 villages (mubans). Tha Tum is a township (thesaban tambon) which covers parts of tambon Tha Tum. There are a further 10 tambon administrative organizations (TAO).

No.	Name	Thai name	Villages	Population
1	Tha Tum	ท่าตูม	22	19,198
2	Krapho	กระโพ	20	15,789
3	Phrom Thep	พรมเทพ	22	7,969
4	Phon Khrok	โพนครก	16	9,344
5	Mueang Kae	เมืองแก	19	10,173
6	Ba	บะ	15	6,555
7	Nong Bua	หนองบัว	11	7,417
8	Bua Khok	บัวโคก	19	9,700
9	Nong Methi	หนองเมธี	11	5,976
10	Thung Kula	ทุ่งกุลา	10	5,269

== Education ==
Schools located in Tha Tum

- Changboon-wittaya School
- Lansai Pitthayakom School
- Muangkae Pittayasan School
- Nontan Pitthayakom School
- Phromthep Pitthayakom School
- Sripathum Pitthayakom School
- Thatumprachasermwit School
- Thungkula Pitthayakom School

== Notable people ==
- Chalermpol Malakham (born 1962), singer
- Patthama Jitsawat (born 1993), singer, Miss Grand Thailand 2026

== Climate ==
Tha Tum District, Surin Province has a tropical savanna climate (Köppen: Aw), characterized by high temperatures throughout the year and a clear distinction between wet and dry seasons. Like much of northeastern Thailand, Tha Tum experiences a strong influence from the seasonal monsoon system, which plays a major role in shaping its climate.

Climate data for Tha Tum (1991–2020, extremes 1970-present)
Month	Jan	Feb	Mar	Apr	May	Jun	Jul	Aug	Sep	Oct	Nov	Dec	Year
Record high °C (°F)	37.4 (99.3)	39.4 (102.9)	41.1 (106.0)	42.3 (108.1)	42.0 (107.6)	38.4 (101.1)	37.8 (100.0)	37.2 (99.0)	36.5 (97.7)	34.7 (94.5)	36.6 (97.9)	35.9 (96.6)	42.3 (108.1)
Mean daily maximum °C (°F)	31.1 (88.0)	33.3 (91.9)	35.5 (95.9)	36.5 (97.7)	35.2 (95.4)	34.0 (93.2)	33.0 (91.4)	32.5 (90.5)	32.0 (89.6)	31.6 (88.9)	31.3 (88.3)	30.3 (86.5)	33.0 (91.4)
Daily mean °C (°F)	24.1 (75.4)	26.3 (79.3)	28.9 (84.0)	30.3 (86.5)	29.7 (85.5)	29.2 (84.6)	28.6 (83.5)	28.3 (82.9)	27.9 (82.2)	27.3 (81.1)	26.0 (78.8)	24.0 (75.2)	27.6 (81.6)
Mean daily minimum °C (°F)	18.0 (64.4)	20.1 (68.2)	23.3 (73.9)	25.1 (77.2)	25.4 (77.7)	25.3 (77.5)	24.9 (76.8)	24.7 (76.5)	24.4 (75.9)	23.4 (74.1)	21.1 (70.0)	18.5 (65.3)	22.9 (73.1)
Record low °C (°F)	7.1 (44.8)	10.6 (51.1)	11.4 (52.5)	15.0 (59.0)	18.5 (65.3)	20.3 (68.5)	21.6 (70.9)	20.4 (68.7)	20.3 (68.5)	16.7 (62.1)	11.5 (52.7)	7.1 (44.8)	7.1 (44.8)
Average precipitation mm (inches)	8.4 (0.33)	11.9 (0.47)	42.9 (1.69)	82.6 (3.25)	168.3 (6.63)	181.4 (7.14)	219.6 (8.65)	231.3 (9.11)	254.5 (10.02)	113.1 (4.45)	19.0 (0.75)	1.6 (0.06)	1,334.6 (52.54)
Average precipitation days (≥ 1.0 mm)	0.7	1.3	3.6	5.0	11.1	11.6	14.0	13.9	14.7	7.2	1.6	0.2	84.9
Average relative humidity (%)	69.5	66.2	64.7	66.6	74.1	76.7	79.0	80.8	83.1	79.5	74.0	70.7	73.7
Source: World Meteorological Organization(extremes)

== Economy ==
Tha Tum District has an economy that is primarily based on agriculture and small-scale local trade. Due to its location along the Mun River basin, the district benefits from fertile alluvial soil, making rice cultivation the dominant economic activity, alongside the production of cassava, sugarcane, and other seasonal crops.

In addition to agriculture, livestock farming—particularly cattle and buffalo—plays an important role in the local economy and contributes to household income in rural communities. Small and medium-sized enterprises, including rice mills, agricultural processing facilities, and local handicraft production, support employment within the district.

Tha Tum also functions as a local commercial center for surrounding rural areas, with traditional markets and retail businesses providing goods and services to residents. While industrial activity remains limited compared to urban districts, ongoing improvements in transportation infrastructure and regional development policies aim to enhance trade connectivity within Surin Province and neighboring areas.

== See also ==
- List of cities in Thailand
- Geography of Thailand
- Economic inequality in Thailand
- Education in Thailand
- Fashion in Thailand
