= Rattanaburi district =

Rattanaburi รัตนบุรี
- District
- District location in Surin province
- Coordinates: 15°19′13″N 103°51′25″E
- Country: Thailand
- Province: Surin

Area
  - Total: 202.8 km^{2} (78.3 sq mi)

Population (2005)
  - Total: 94,060
  - Density: 463.8/km^{2} (1,201/sq mi)
- Time zone: UTC+7 (ICT)
- Postal code: 32130
- Geocode: 3207

Rattanaburi (Thai: รัตนบุรี, pronounced [rát.tā.ná(ʔ).bū.rīː]; Northeastern Thai: รัตนบุรี, pronounced [làt.tā.nà(ʔ).bū.lîː]) is a district (amphoe) in the northeastern part of Surin province, northeastern Thailand. Famous Hollywood Thai actor Tony Jaa was born in Rattanaburi

== History ==
Rattanaburi was a mueang under Mueang Surin, which was converted into a district in the Thesaphiban administrative reforms at the end of the 19th century.

== Geography ==
Neighboring districts are (from the south clockwise): Non Narai, Sanom and Tha Tum of Surin Province; Suwannaphum and Phon Sai of Roi Et province; and Rasi Salai, Bueng Bun, Pho Si Suwan and Mueang Chan of Sisaket province.

== Administration ==
The district is divided into 12 sub-districts (tambons), which are further subdivided into 163 villages (mubans). Rattanaburi is a township (thesaban tambon) which covers parts of tambons Rattanaburi and Phai. There are a further 12 tambon administrative organizations (TAO).

No.	Name	Thai name	Villages	Pop.
1.	Rattanaburi	รัตนบุรี	17	15,518
2.	That	ธาตุ	14	7,271
3.	Kae	แก	15	6,322
4.	Don Raet	ดอนแรด	16	9,760
5.	Nong Bua Thong	หนองบัวทอง	10	4,649
6.	Nong Bua Ban	หนองบัวบาน	15	10,999
9.	Phai	ไผ่	14	9,573
11.	Boet	เบิด	17	7,702
13.	Nam Khiao	น้ำเขียว	13	5,704
14.	Kut Kha Khim	กุดขาคีม	11	5,912
15.	Yang Sawang	ยางสว่าง	11	4,508
16.	Thap Yai	ทับใหญ่	10	6,142

Missing numbers are tambon which now form Non Narai District.
