= Chom Phra district =

Chom Phra จอมพระ
- District
- District location in Surin province
- Coordinates: 15°7′3″N 103°36′41″E
- Country: Thailand
- Province: Surin

Area
  - Total: 314.0 km^{2} (121.2 sq mi)

Population (2005)
  - Total: 60,568
  - Density: 192.9/km^{2} (500/sq mi)
- Time zone: UTC+7 (ICT)
- Postal code: 32180
- Geocode: 3204

Chom Phra (Thai: จอมพระ, pronounced [t͡ɕɔ̄ːm pʰráʔ]) is a district (amphoe) in the northern part of Surin province, northeastern Thailand.

== Geography ==
Neighboring districts are (from the north clockwise): Tha Tum, Sanom, Sikhoraphum, Khwao Sinarin and Mueang Surin of Surin Province; and Satuek of Buriram province.

== History ==
The minor district (king amphoe) Chom Phra was established in 1959, when it was split off from Tha Tum district. On 27 July 1965 it was upgraded to a full district.

== Administration ==
The district is divided into nine sub-districts (tambons), which are further subdivided into 105 villages (mubans). Chom Phra is a township (thesaban tambon) which covers parts of tambon Chom Phra. There are a further nine tambon administrative organizations (TAO).

| No. | Name | Thai name | Villages | Pop. |
|---|---|---|---|---|
| 1. | Chom Phra | จอมพระ | 15 | 10,471 |
| 2. | Mueang Ling | เมืองลีง | 18 | 10,729 |
| 3. | Krahat | กระหาด | 9 | 3,979 |
| 4. | Bu Kraeng | บุแกรง | 15 | 7,912 |
| 5. | Nong Sanit | หนองสนิท | 10 | 6,918 |
| 6. | Ban Phue | บ้านผือ | 11 | 5,599 |
| 7. | Lum Rawi | ลุ่มระวี | 10 | 4,841 |
| 8. | Chum Saeng | ชุมแสง | 7 | 4,978 |
| 9. | Pen Suk | เป็นสุข | 10 | 5,141 |
