= Non Narai district =

Non Narai โนนนารายณ์
- District
- District location in Surin province
- Coordinates: 15°14′18″N 103°54′47″E
- Country: Thailand
- Province: Surin
- Seat: Nong Luang

Area
  - Total: 199.2 km^{2} (76.9 sq mi)

Population (2005)
  - Total: 35,394
  - Density: 177.7/km^{2} (460/sq mi)
- Time zone: UTC+7 (ICT)
- Postal code: 32130
- Geocode: 3217

Non Narai (Thai: โนนนารายณ์, pronounced [nōːn nāː.rāːj]) is a district (amphoe) of Surin province, northeastern Thailand.

== History ==
The minor district (king amphoe) was established on 1 July 1997, when five tambons were split from Rattanaburi district.

On 15 May 2007, all 81 minor districts were upgraded to full districts. On 24 August the upgrade became official.

== Geography ==
Neighboring districts are (from the south clockwise): Samrong Thap, Sanom and Rattanaburi of Surin Province, and Mueang Chan of Sisaket province.

== Administration ==
The district is divided into five sub-districts (tambons), which are further subdivided into 67 villages (mubans). There are no municipal (thesaban) areas, and further five tambon administrative organizations (TAO).

No.	Name	Thai name	Villages	Pop.
1.	Nong Luang	หนองหลวง	8	5,610
2.	Kham Phong	คำผง	12	6,094
3.	Non	โนน	15	5,980
4.	Rawiang	ระเวียง	13	8,821
5.	Nong Thep	หนองเทพ	19	8,889
