= Surin Elephant Round-up =

Cultural festival in Thailand

Coordinates: 14.872693°N 103.494928°E

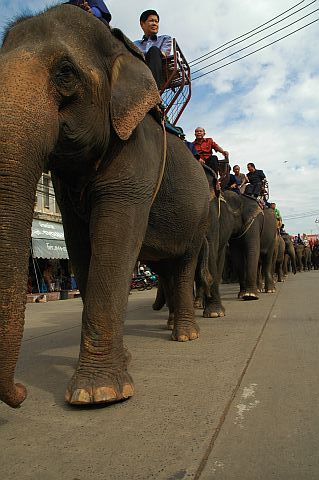
- Elephant Parade at the Elephant Round-up
- Observed by: Kuy people
- Celebrations: Parade, Tug of war, Elephant buffet, Soccer, Mock battles
- Date: Third week of November each year
- Duration: 2 days
- Frequency: Annual

The Surin Elephant Round-up is a cultural festival held every year in Surin Province, Isan, Thailand. Usually the event is organized during the third week of November on the weekend. The festival has its origins in the royal hunts which were conducted in Surin Province during medieval times. The indigenous residents of Surin, the Kuy, have been traditional practitioners of corralling elephants and training them as working animals. When the Ayutthaya Kingdom came into power these hunts were converted into a public extravaganza and wild elephants were replaced with tame ones. The festival, in its contemporary form, was first organized in the 1960s when civil war in Cambodia and the steady decline in economic value of elephants forced the elephant handlers (mahouts) to seek occupations in the entertainment and tourism industry.

The modern two-day event includes a variety of shows displaying the physical prowess and skill of the animals, such as soccer games and tugs of war with the Royal Thai Army. Elephants painting pictures, playing polo, and whirling hula hoops on their trunks are also incorporated into the show. Numerous floats are put on display. The venue for the event, Si Narong Stadium, has been dubbed the "world's largest domestic elephant village" by the Tourism Authority of Thailand.

== Ancient tradition ==
Since ancient times wild elephants, believed to number in the thousands, roamed freely in the forests around Thailand. In Surin these elephants were rounded up, corralled and captured in hunts which were highly ritualistic and involved many mythological aspects. These hunts also served an economic purpose, as the captured elephants were tamed and used as pack animals or sometimes as war animals. These ritual hunts were noted by historians as ancient as Strabo, Arrian, and Megasthenes. The hunters, who mainly came from the tribe of Kuy people, performed several rituals before, during and after performing the actual hunt. These included divination from bones, wearing special clothes believed to possess protective powers, praying to the lassos for the strength to restrain the elephants and praying to ancestors. They also prayed to terrestrial and woodland spirits to grant success to the hunt.

== Emergence as a spectacle ==
=== 14th to 18th century ===
While the Ayutthaya Kings were in power, the elephant hunts were converted into a public spectacle and lost much of their ritualistic element. The round-ups became a royally sponsored event where local dignitaries and overseas guests were invited to savour the spectacle. Among these notable foreign dignitaries, who attended the event through royal invitation was François-Timoléon de Choisy. He wrote in his diary that the king had arranged a special round-up for his foreign guests even though the real event date had not arrived.

=== Late-19th century to 1960s ===
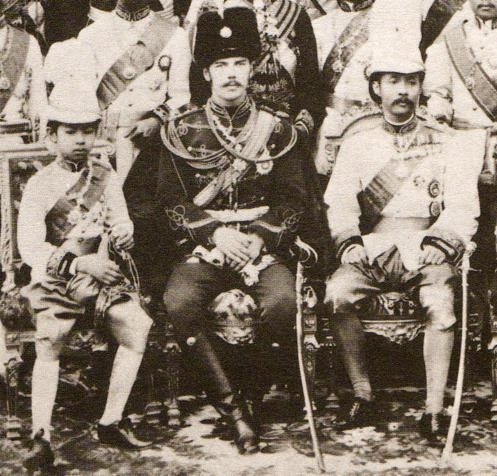
Tsesarevich Nikolai Alexandrovich Romanov in Siam with Crown Prince Maha Vajirunhis (left) and King Chulalongkorn (right), March 1891

As the post-war era neared its end, the elephant round-up became progressively more staged and less of a real hunt. It became common to use tame or even trained elephants during the event. The round-ups were enacted primarily for the entertainment of royal guests. For example, King Chulalongkorn, also called Rama V, had a round-up specially staged for the Russian Prince Nicholas II in 1891 during the latter's world tour as a crown prince. Eliza Ruhamah Scidmore visited Thailand and its provinces during 1903 and was bestowed with a royal invitation to see the round-up as an envoy of the NGS. She wrote about her experience, titling the story "The Greatest Hunt in the World". In her printed story she related that the monarch of Siam and his entourage came to stay at the summer palace for the roundup which they sponsored. Dignitaries came by cruiser or rail, and locals mostly arrived by boat. She said that hunters worked for many hours and used various tactics to herd elephants numbering in their hundreds towards the "kraal". The krall was an enclosure, the broadness of whose walls was about two meters and it had an inner enclosure made out of thick teak logs which measured up three and half meters in height. Iron bands buttressed the wooden walls. According to her account, more than 250 elephants were rounded up that year. Some were unintentionally hurt as they stomped and trumpeted during the round-up, but these received immediate care.

Over time, the round-ups grew progressively staged. The elephants utilized in the round-ups were often tame, who had to play the role of wild animals. This move from actual to artifice preceded the influx of tourism and therefore tourists never witnessed a real hunt. By 1938, the round-up had transitioned so far into a staged event that ladies in the audience were asked to choose which elephant ought to be captured next. The round-ups were abandoned in 1938, although a special "last" round-up was officially sponsored by the monarchy in 1962. It was staged in honour of King Frederik IX of Denmark and his wife Ingrid, who visited Thailand in early-1962.

== Re-emergence as a contemporary cultural festival ==
Less than 34 years after the event lost royal patronage, it re-emerged as a prominent social festival with less ritual and more flair. According to some sources the first such round-up was organized and celebrated in 1955, while according to others the first event was celebrated in the 1960s. Either way, the first modern event was held on a modest scale in the Tha Tum subdistrict of Surin Province.

The festival was then moved to Surin proper. Nowadays, elephants and their trainers travel 100 km to Surin to participate in the festival. The ritualistic elements and traits of the festival have all but disappeared and the festival has become a pure tourist festival.

== Events held during the modern festival ==
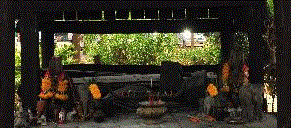
The area dedicated to praying before the lasso and getting blessed with it before the hunt begins. According to myth the lasso is the spirit of the hunt.

=== Preparation ===
The Kuy hunters who are singled out to perform in the round-up perform a morning ritual called the "Pak Kum Luang" almost an entire week before the festival. This ritual includes praying at the Pakam shrine, which is sacred to the lasso, as their elders had done in ancient times and then offering pigs heads, chickens, wine, jos sticks and herbs. When the required sign is obtained, the elders blow the hunters horn which signals that the 60 km long trek to the festival can commence. The journey is usually undertaken using trucks. The elephants and their mahouts arrive with at least five days to spare and spend this time roaming the streets while offering rides and practicing for their performance. The wives of the mahouts travel alongside them.

=== Festival ===
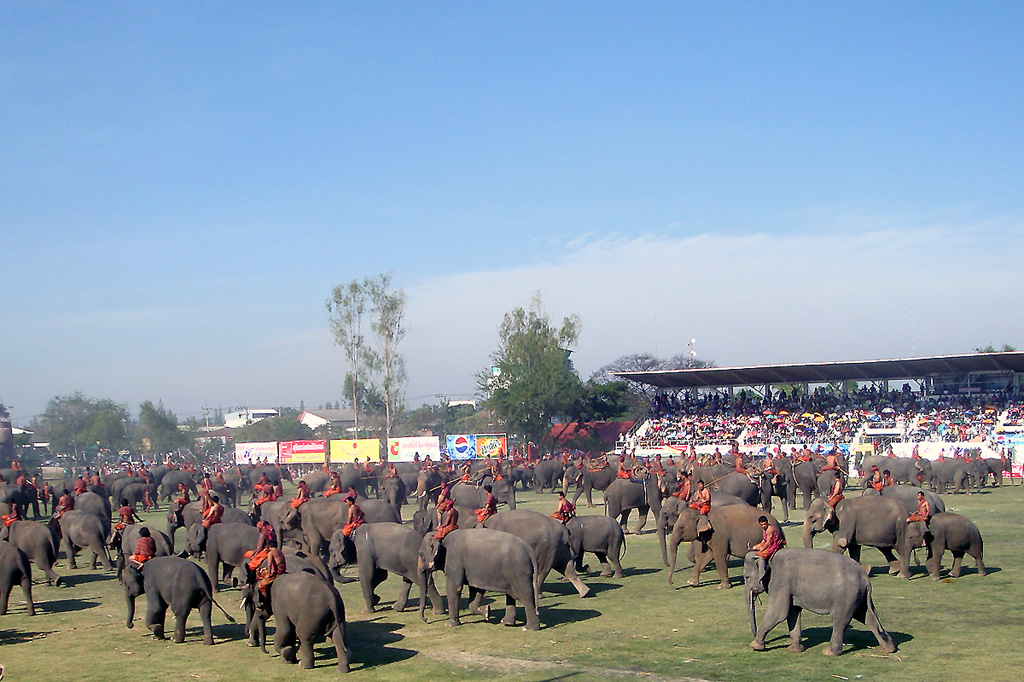
Elephant Parade

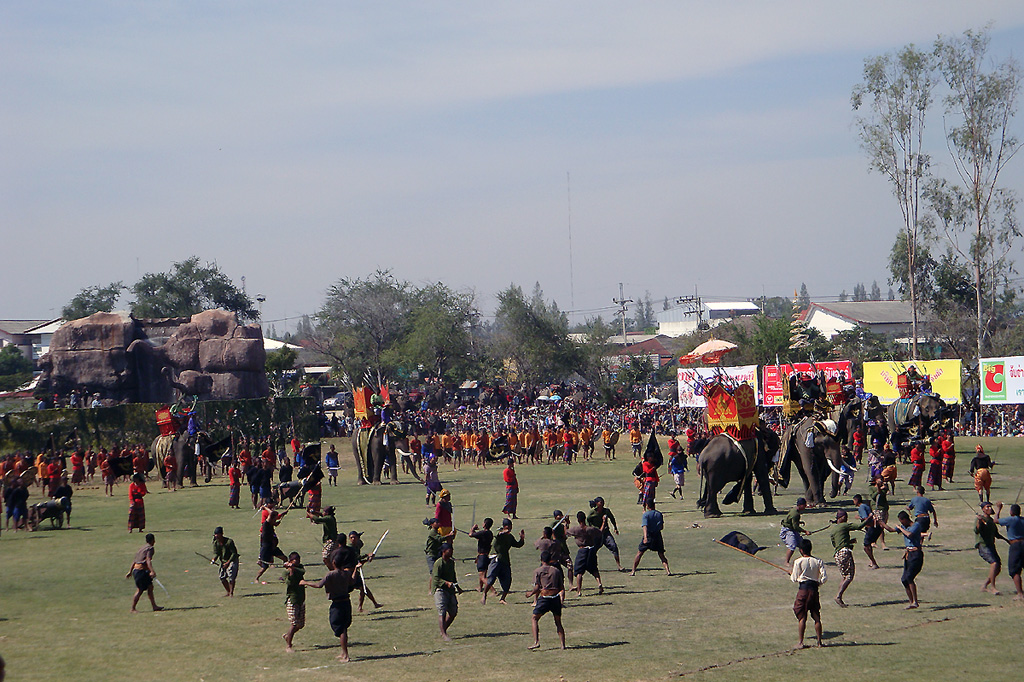
Soldiers prepare for tug of war

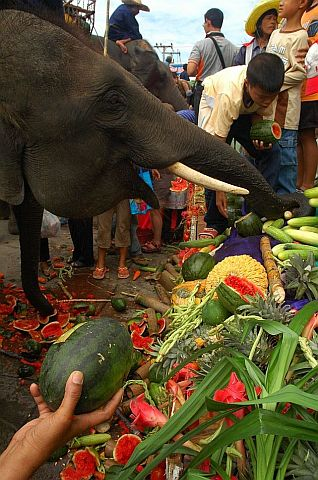
Elephant breakfast (usually held on the Friday morning)

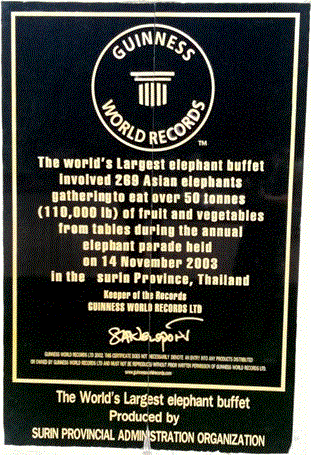
World Record for the largest serving of food to pachyderms

On Friday morning, a marching procession of approximately 300 elephants starts moving through Surin city from the railway station toward the elephant roundabout on Prasat Road in the southernmost neighborhood of the city.

The elephants carry dignitaries who dismount their steeds on arrival. Some elephants carry mahouts in authentic replicas of battle outfits from the Thai–Khmer–Laos battles. Intermingled with the elephant procession are students of local schools and their teachers in traditional dress, who are dancing and playing music.

Once all the elephants have arrived, the banquet begins. The tables for the banquet measure 400 meters in length and are customarily decorated with traditional silk cloth.

The food is presented before the elephants; leftovers are taken home by the local people. On 14 November 2003, the buffet set a Guinness World Record for "largest elephant buffet" when 269 Asian elephants came together to devour over 50 tonnes (50,000 kg; 110,000 lb) of fruit and vegetables.

On Saturday, the entire company of elephants and their mahouts congregate at the Elephant Stadium just after daybreak. The ceremony at the stadium begins with a speech from the chairperson of the ceremony, after which baby elephants are paraded through the stadium. Then the processional march of bull elephants takes place. Next, the Kuy hunters pray to the lasso and showcase their skills at capturing elephants. They display how elephants were captured by hunters working alone, and how sometimes elephant riders were used to capture other elephants. Tame elephants which could be utilized to corral wild ones have been bred by the Kuy people since ancient times and are called Khonkies or Koomkies.

After the elephant capture technique displays, there are displays of acrobatics, matches of soccer and polo, and displays of tasks performed by tamed elephants, such as logging. Another event which displays the raw strength of Surin's elephants is the elephant vs. army tug of war contest. The contest starts with 50 army personnel against the biggest bull elephant. As the bull beats the soldiers, 15 more are added until there are 100 soldiers matched against a single bull, and even then the bull usually wins.

The finale of the show is re-enactment of a historical battle between Siamese and Burmese forces. The forces are dressed in traditional colours with red for Siam and blue for Burma. They take up positions according to traditional battle tactics, with a front row of foot soldiers, central portion of elephants protecting the "king" elephant in the middle and a rear guard. The battle ends with Siamese victory.

Along with the elephant show the stadium hosts a mini-half marathon called "Mueang Chang". The Red Cross Society also holds a cultural performance with the elephant show. The elephant show is repeated on Sunday morning.
