= Sikhoraphum district =

Sikhoraphum ศีขรภูมิ
- District
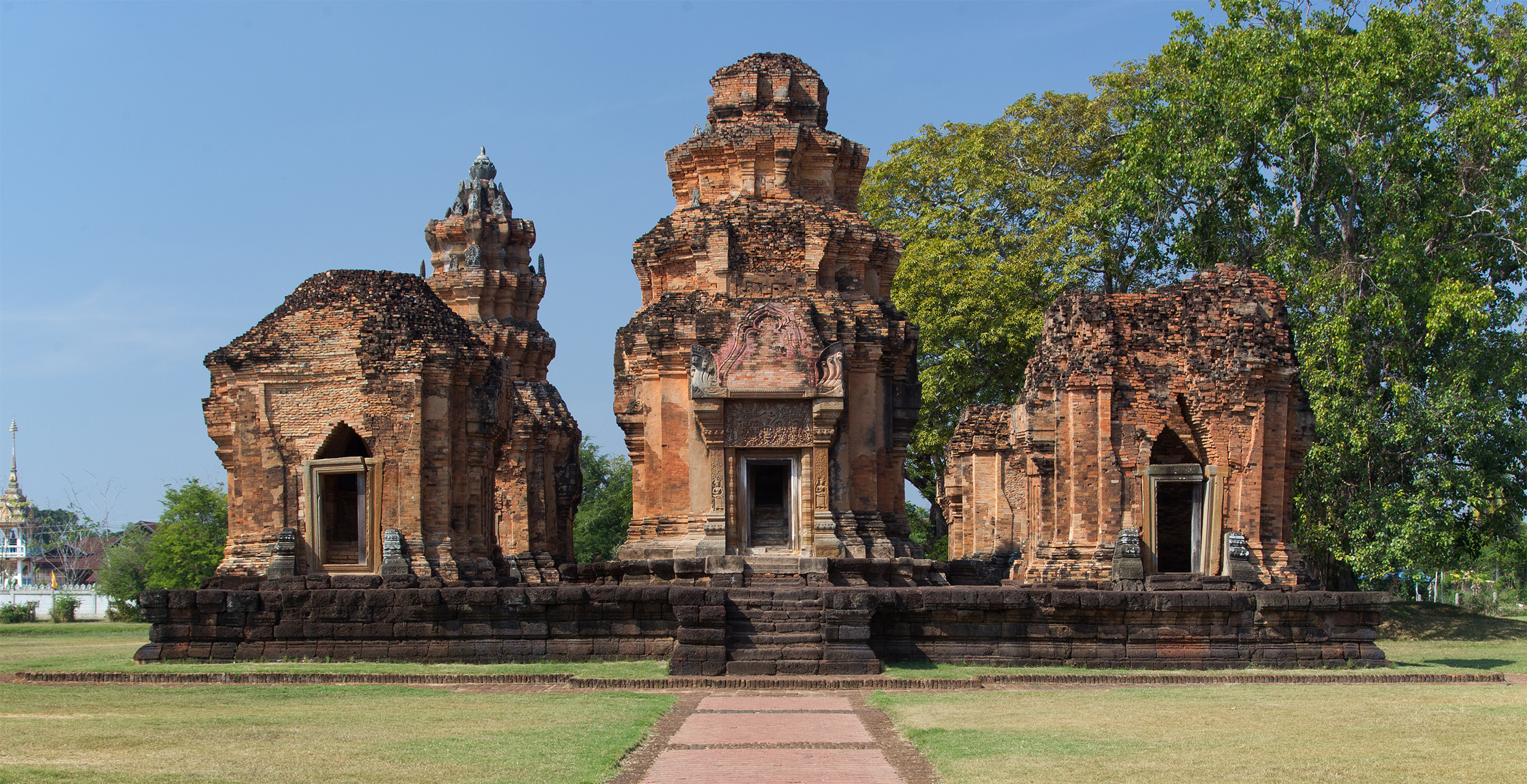
- Prasat Sikhoraphum (Sikhoraphum Temple)

- District location in Surin province
- Coordinates: 14°56′48″N 103°47′30″E
- Country: Thailand
- Province: Surin

Area
  - Total: 561.623 km^{2} (216.844 sq mi)

Population (2005)
  - Total: 138,020
  - Density: 245.8/km^{2} (637/sq mi)
- Time zone: UTC+7 (ICT)
- Postal code: 32150
- Geocode: 3209

Sikhoraphum (Thai: ศีขรภูมิ, pronounced [sǐː.kʰɔ̌ː.rā.pʰūːm]) is a district (amphoe) in the central part of Surin province, northeastern Thailand.

== Geography ==
Neighboring districts are (from the north clockwise): Sanom and Samrong Thap of Surin Province; Prang Ku of Sisaket province; Si Narong, Lamduan, Mueang Surin, Khwao Sinarin and Chom Phra of Surin.

Sikhoraphum is approximately 30 minutes from Mueang Surin by train.

== History ==
Sikhoraphum in the past about 1,000 years ago, like most parts of Surin, it was part of the Khmer Empire. Therefore, it is home to many ancient Khmer temples. The most prominent is Prasat Sikhoraphum.

Round about 1950s, Sikhoraphum was home to Thai Chinese people. At that time there was still no water supply available, while electricity will be available from 06.00 p.m. until about midnight only. King Bhumibol Adulyadej (Rama IX) and his wife Queen Sirikit used to travel here by train to Ubon Ratchathani. Many people and students came to welcome.

== Administration ==
The district is divided into 15 sub-districts (tambons), which are further subdivided into 226 villages (mubans). Ra Ngaeng is a township (thesaban tambon) which covers parts of tambon Ra Ngaeng. There are a further 15 tambon administrative organizations (TAO).

No.	Name	Thai name	Villages	Pop.
1.	Ra-ngaeng	ระแงง	14	11,352
2.	Truem	ตรึม	18	10,308
3.	Charaphat	จารพัต	19	10,558
4.	Yang	ยาง	18	9,953
5.	Taen	แตล	22	12,974
6.	Nong Bua	หนองบัว	18	8,881
7.	Khalamae	คาละแมะ	15	6,524
8.	Nong Lek	หนองเหล็ก	18	12,620
9.	Nong Khwao	หนองขวาว	17	9,390
10.	Chang Pi	ช่างปี่	14	10,433
11.	Kut Wai	กุดหวาย	14	8,106
12.	Khwao Yai	ขวาวใหญ่	9	5,532
13.	Na Rung	นารุ่ง	9	5,603
14.	Trom Phrai	ตรมไพร	10	8,119
15.	Phak Mai	ผักไหม	11	7,667

== Local dishes ==
- Bean toffee
- Kalamae prasat deaw (dodol)
- Egg noodles
