= Surin province =

Province of Thailand

Coordinates: 14°52′48″N 103°29′24″E

Surin สุรินทร์ (Thai)
- Province

Other transcription(s)
  - Northern Khmer: ซเร็น (pronounced [srenː])
  - Kuy: สุลิน (pronounced [su.linː])
  - Isan: สุรินทร์ (pronounced [sù.līn])
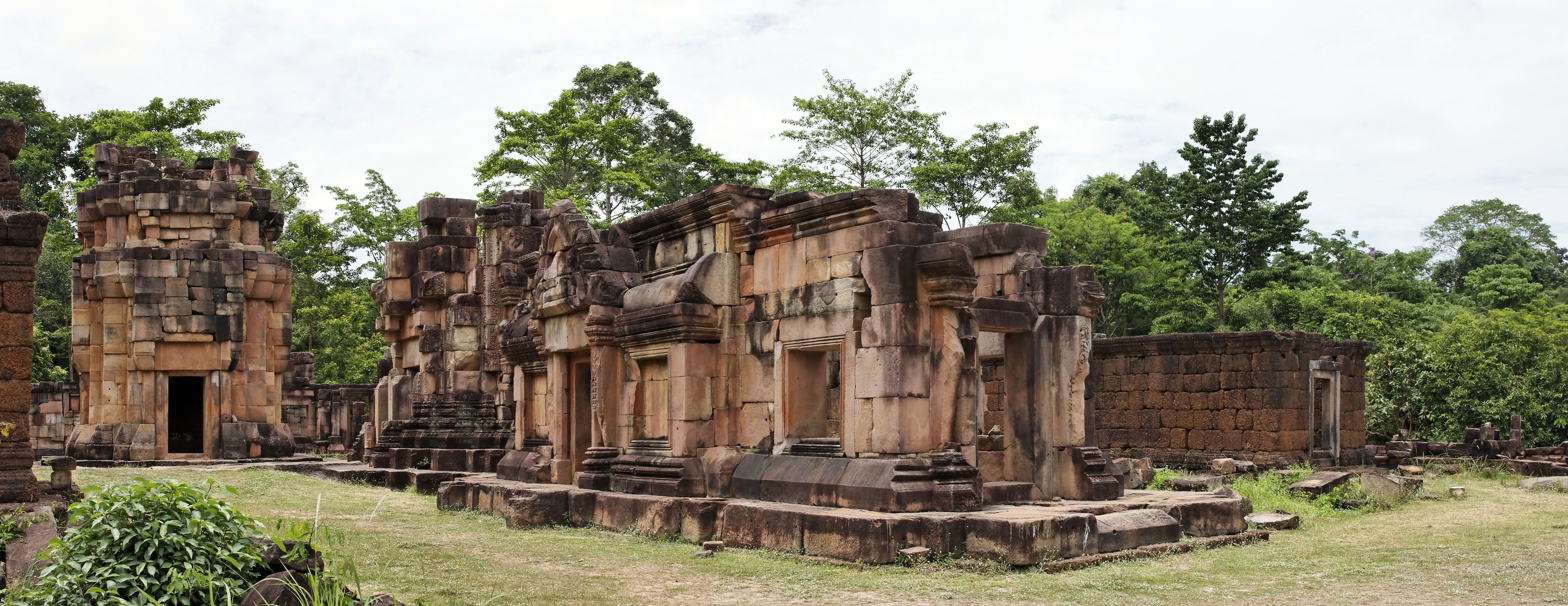
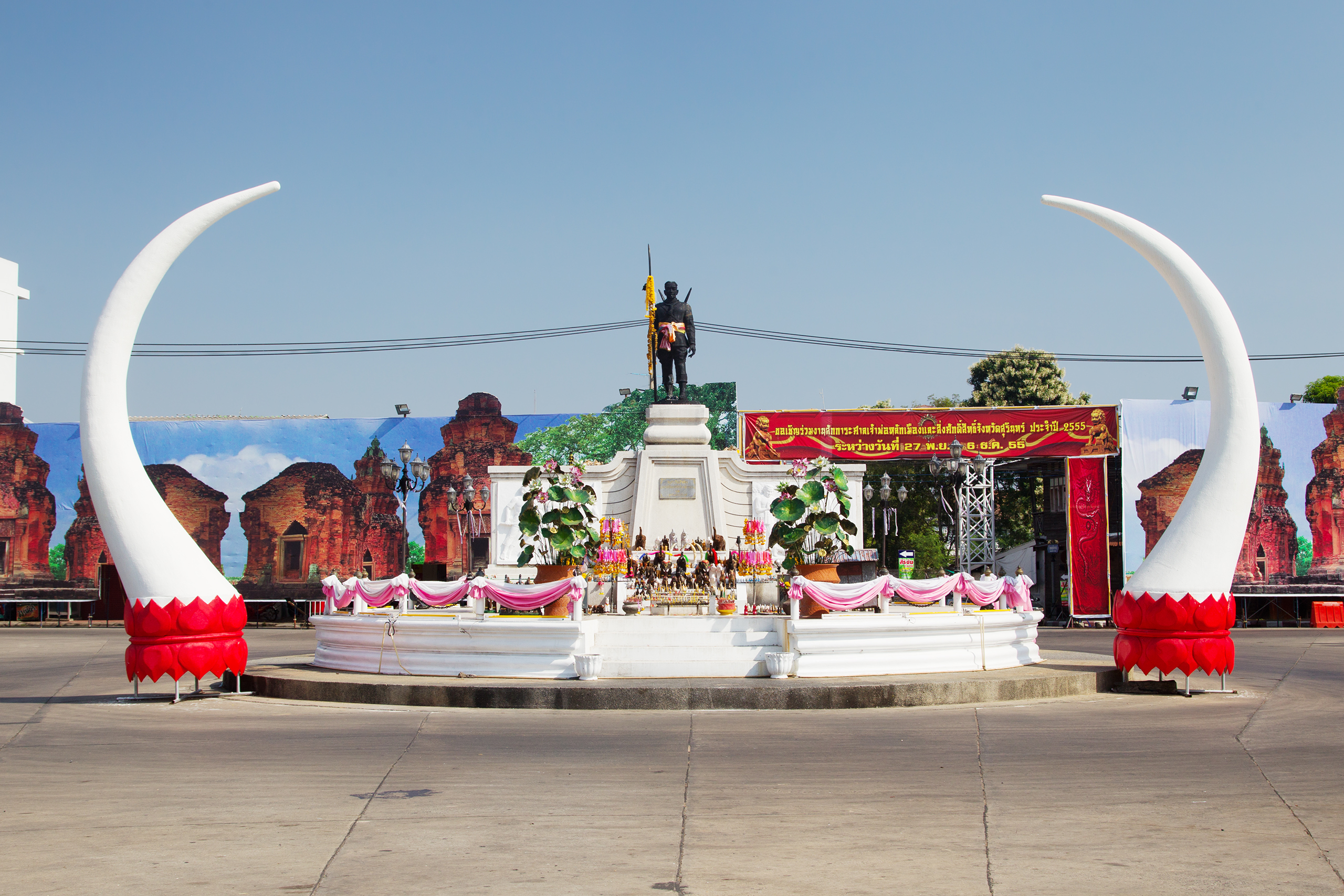
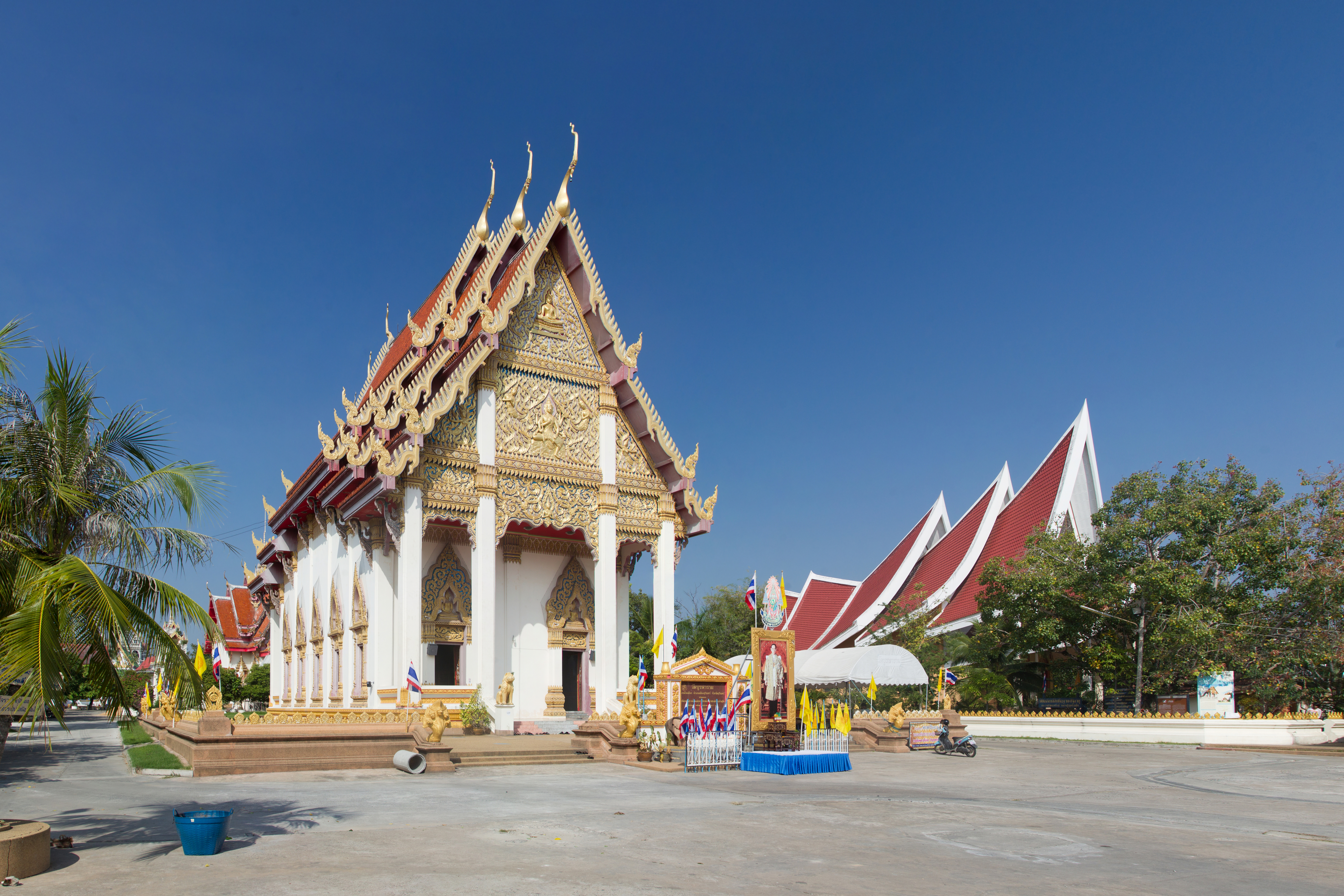
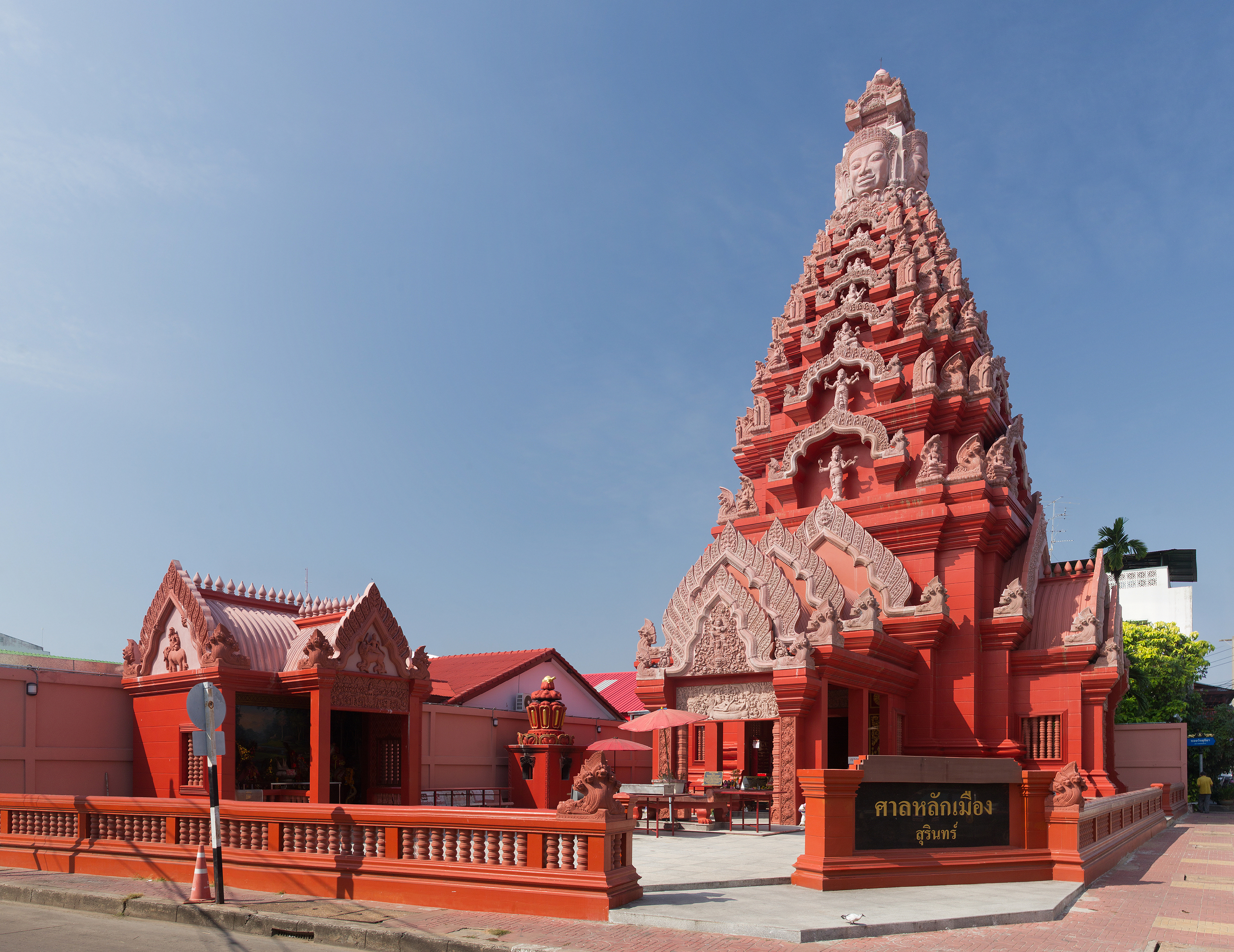
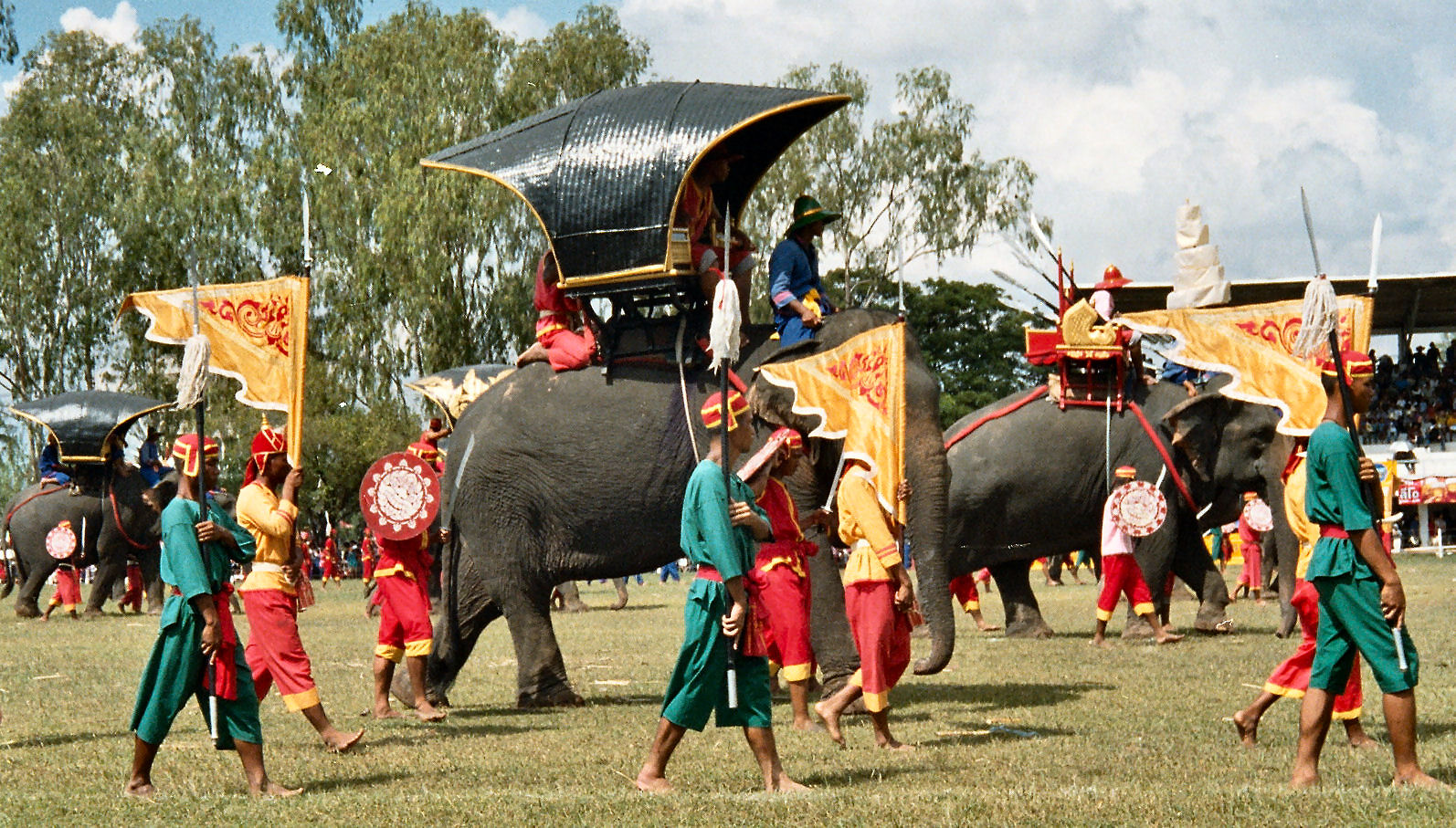
- From top; left to right: Prasat Ta Muen Thom, The Monument of Phaya Surin Phakdi Si Narong Changwang, Wat Burapharam, Surin City Pillar Shrine, Surin Elephant Round-up.

- Flag Seal
- Nickname: Mueang Chang (lit. 'City of Elephants')
- Mottoes: สุรินทร์ ถิ่นช้างใหญ่ ผ้าไหมงาม ประคำสวย ร่ำรวยปราสาท ผักกาดหวาน ข้าวสารหอม งามพร้อมวัฒนธรรม ("Surin. Home of large elephants. Beautiful silk and prayer beads. Rich in (stone) castles. Sweet radishes. Fragrant rice. Fascinating culture.")
- Map of Thailand highlighting Surin province
- Country: Thailand
- Capital: Surin

Government
  - Governor: Chamnan Chuenta

Area
  - Total: 8,854 km^{2} (3,419 sq mi)
  - Rank: 22nd

Population (2024)
  - Total: ▼1,360,245
  - Rank: 13th
  - Density: 154/km^{2} (400/sq mi)
  - Rank: 26th

Human Achievement Index
  - HAI (2022): 0.5935 "low" Ranked 77th

GDP
  - Total: baht 73 billion (US$2.4 billion) (2019)
- Time zone: UTC+7 (ICT)
- Postal code: 32xxx
- Calling code: 044
- ISO 3166 code: TH-32
- Website: surin.go.th

Surin Provincial Administrative Organization องค์การบริหารส่วนจังหวัดสุรินทร์
- Provincial Administrative Organization
- Interactive map of Surin Provincial Administrative Organization

Government
  - Type: Local administrative divisions
  - Body: Surin Provincial Administrative Organization
  - President: Thanyaporn Mungcharoenphon
- Website: surinpao.go.th

Surin (Thai: สุรินทร์, pronounced [sù.rīn]) is one of Thailand's seventy-seven provinces (changwat). It lies in lower northeastern Thailand, also called Isan. Neighboring provinces are (from west clockwise) Buriram, Maha Sarakham, Roi Et, and Sisaket. To the south it borders Oddar Meancheay of Cambodia. Surin covers a total area of 8,854 km^{2} (3,419 sq mi) from the Mun River in the north to the Dangrek Mountains in the south. The capital, Surin city, in the western central region province is 434 km from Bangkok.

The area of present-day Surin has long history of human settlement which dates back to prehistoric times. Historically the region has been ruled by various powerful kingdoms including the Angkorian Khmer Empire, the Lao kingdom Lan Xang, and the Thai kingdom of Ayutthaya. Reflecting this history as part the greater geo-cultural area of Thailand known as Isan, Surin is ethnically diverse. The primary language is the Isan dialect of Lao. Speakers of Central Thai account for a small minority while nearly 50% of the population are ethnic Khmer. The remainder are speakers of various Lao languages and small tribal groups such as the Kuy and Nyah Kur.

The northeast provinces have traditionally been isolated, both physically and culturally, from the rest of Thailand and Surin is no exception. The vast majority of the province is rural and relatively poor. There is little industrial development with rice farming being the primary industry. Rice farmers supplement their income by cutting sugar cane, as construction laborers, or working in the local silk weaving trade. Elephant capture and training is also an important industry in Surin. Approximately 25 percent of all the elephants in the kingdom are raised in Surin, predominantly by the ethnic Kuy people.

Tourism is also important to the Surin economy. Elephants and scenery are increasingly seen as potentially lucrative by the provincial government which has attempted to make Surin a destination for international ecotourism. Domestically, Surin has a reputation for its fine silk and silver beaded ornaments produced in tourist-focused villages such as Khwao Sinaring Handicraft Village. Local traders also conduct cross-border commerce with Cambodians through a border crossing at Chong Chom, 70 km south of Surin city.

== Name ==
According to legend, the province was given its current name in 1786 in honor of its royal governor, Chiangpum, whose royal title was Luang Surin Phakdi. The Surin portion of the title is a compound of two words, สุระ and อินทร์, derived from the Sanskrit words sura (Devanagari: सुर), meaning 'god' (cf. Asura), and Intar (Devanagari: इन्द्र), Indra.

Prior to the 14th century, the area was part of the Khmer empire in its province of Kok Khan (Khmer: គោកខណ្ឌ). The name of the region during the period after the fall of the Khmer Empire until acquiring its current name has been lost to history.

== Geography ==
Surin lies at the center of the southern edge of the Khorat Plateau, a relatively low-lying interior region isolated from the rest of Southeast Asia by surrounding mountain ranges. The south of the province is dominated by the Dongrek mountain range, the escarpment of which demarcates the watershed boundaries and also forms the international border with Cambodia. The mountains, averaging approximately 500m in elevation, are not particularly high but the southward sides are steep cliffs rising rather abruptly from the northern plains of Cambodia significantly hindering any attempt at passing. The main pass in the region is in Surin and cuts through the mountains between Chong Chom and O Smach, Cambodia.

The northern face of the mountain range slopes gently down leveling out into the rolling flood plains that make up the central and northern regions of Surin. These areas are drained by small meandering streams which run roughly south-to-north and drain into the Mun River, which cuts through the extreme north of the province flowing east to eventually empty into the Mekong. As the third longest river in Thailand and second largest by volume of water, the Mun has been important in the region since prehistoric times.

The northwestern area of Surin is a panhandle that juts westward into Buriram province at the confluence of the Mun with Chi Creek (Thai: ห้วยชี), which flows down from the Dangrek mountains, passing just west of the provincial capital of Surin city, and forms most of the western provincial border between Surin and Buriram. The Mun river valley forms the southern provincial border of this panhandle before extending somewhat diagonally northeast, opening up into a large lake near Tha Tum. Leaving the lake, the Mun continues on to meet the provincial border with Roi Et province just west of Road 215, effectively cutting off the mainly agricultural panhandle area from the rest of Surin. From there, the Mun River continues eastward forming the northern provincial boundary of Surin all the way to the confluence with the Thap Than Creek (Thai: ห้วยทับทัน) that forms the eastern border of Surin with Sisaket province.

The total forest area is 748 km^{2} (289 sq mi) or 8.4 percent of provincial area.

=== Wildlife sanctuary ===
There is one wildlife sanctuary, along with five other wildlife sanctuaries, make up region 9 (Ubon Ratchathani) of Thailand's protected areas.

- Huai Thap Than–Huai Samran Wildlife Sanctuary, 501 km^{2} (193 sq mi)

== Administrative divisions ==
Map with 17 districts

=== Provincial government ===
The province is divided into 17 districts (amphoes). The districts are further divided into 158 subdistricts (tambons) and 2011 villages (mubans).

1. Mueang Surin
2. Chumphon Buri
3. Tha Tum
4. Chom Phra
5. Prasat
6. Kap Choeng
7. Rattanaburi
8. Sanom
9. Sikhoraphum
10. Sangkha
11. Lamduan
12. Samrong Thap
13. Buachet
14. Phanom Dong Rak
15. Si Narong
16. Khwao Sinarin
17. Non Narai

=== Local government ===
As of 26 November 2019 there are: one Surin Provincial Administration Organisation (ongkan borihan suan changwat) and 28 municipal (thesaban) areas in the province. Surin has town (thesaban mueang) status. Further 27 subdistrict municipalities (thesaban tambon). The non-municipal areas are administered by 144 Subdistrict Administrative Organisations – SAO (ongkan borihan suan tambon).

== Climate ==
Due to its position in the Khorat Plateau, the climate of Surin is largely affected by the surrounding mountains which block much of the rain that would otherwise be carried to the province by the monsoons. This results in lower annual rainfall totals and greater differences between the rainy and dry seasons than areas outside the plateau.

== History ==
=== Prehistory ===
Historical affiliations

Khmer Empire 802–1431
Kingdom of Lan Xang 1431–1713
Kingdom of Champasak 1713–1904
Kingdom of Siam 1904–1932
Kingdom of Thailand 1932–present

Archaeological sites in the Khorat Plateau have provided some of the earliest evidence of pottery, metallurgy and developed wet rice cultivation in Southeast Asia. The Mun river valley and surrounding basin has supported rice growing cultures since prehistoric times. The earliest settlers in the region were hunter-gatherers. The Neolithic period, which saw the introduction of agriculture, dates from 2,500 to 1,500 years BCE. The Bronze Age follows from 1,500 to 500 BCE, and the Iron Age from 500 BCE to 500 CE. The first evidence of human settlement in Surin emerges in the Iron Age, with approximately 60 known Iron Age sites. These prehistoric settlers are assumed to be ancestors of the various Mon-Khmer peoples prevalent in the area today.

=== Historical period ===
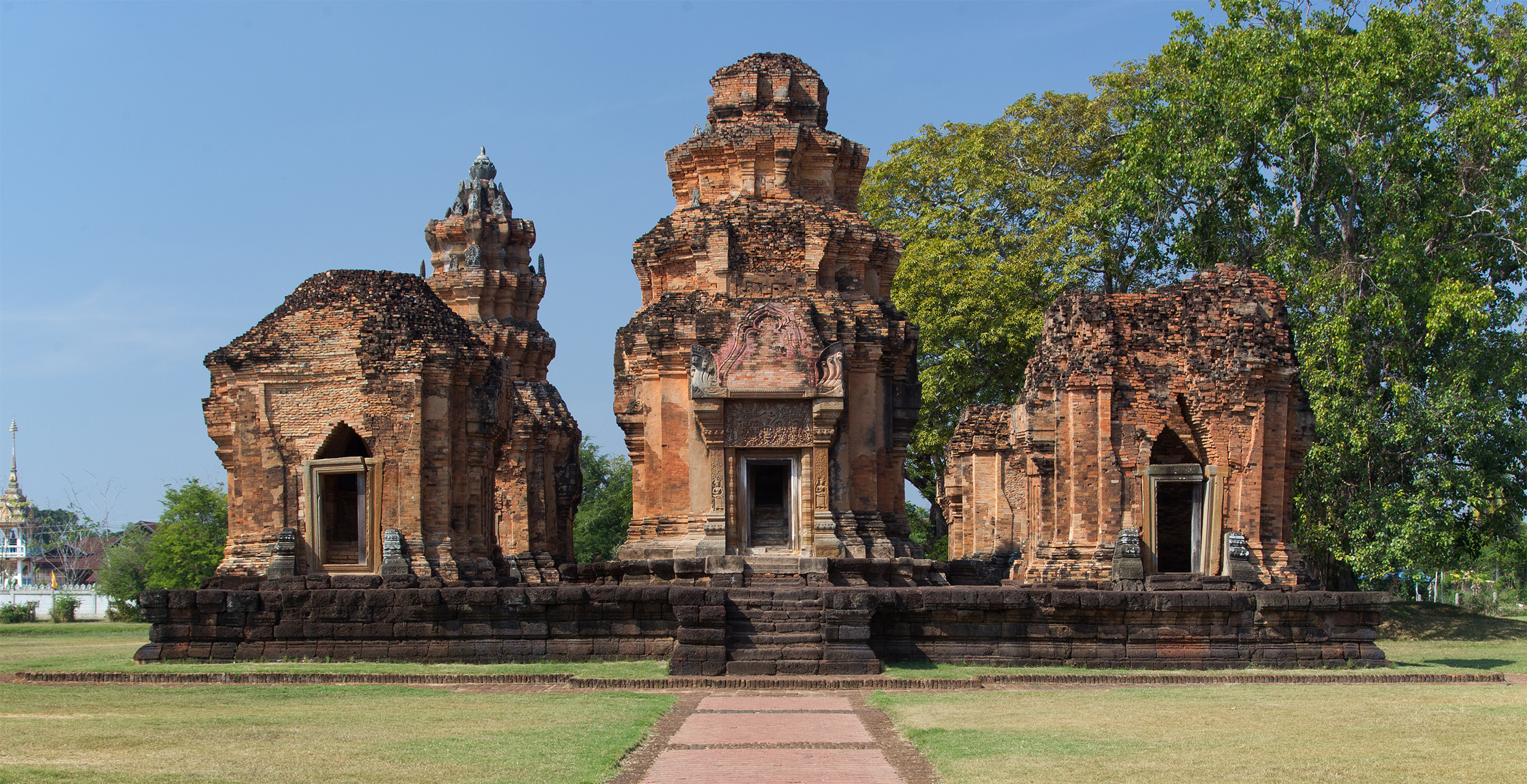
Prasat Sikhoraphum Temple

The earliest known historical period is the Dvaravati. This was an Indian-based culture, which defused through the northeast region of what is now Thailand. Evidence of this culture is found in Surin region dating to between the 7th–11th centuries CE. It was in this period that Buddhism became the dominant religion of the region.

Following the Dvaravati period, the powerful Khmer Empire expanded its influence throughout what is now the southern Isan region of Thailand. This period covers the 7th–13th centuries CE. Surin was an important part of the ancient Khmer empire. Temple ruins and a substantial ethnic Khmer minority remain part of Surin. Khmer stone inscriptions date from c. 600 CE. Over the next several centuries a growing number of Khmer sites were constructed in the province, most notably Prasat Sikhoraphum. These sites would have formed part of the network of Khmer infrastructure centred on Prasat Phanom Rung.

With the collapse of the Khmer empire in the 15th century, Surin faded from history, not to re-emerge until the 18th century. According to legend, a local Kuay leader named Chiangpum presented a rare white elephant to Chao Phaya Chakri, the future King Rama I. In gratitude, he awarded Chiangpum the royal title Luang Surin Phakdi and appointed him village headman. When he became monarch, Rama I named Luang Surin Phakdi as the provincial governor. In 1763 Chiangpum's village moved 15 kilometers to its present location and was upgraded to a city named Muang Prathai Saman. According to tradition, the move was due to better water at the new site. In 1786 the name was changed to Surin in honor of its royal governor.

The province slowly grew as people returned to the area. Although there was a continual influx of people from the surrounding areas, Surin was largely self-sufficient and remained somewhat isolated until the arrival of the railroad in 1922. Chinese and Indian merchants settled in the city, manufacturing increased, and Surin gradually became a modern metropolis.

== Culture ==
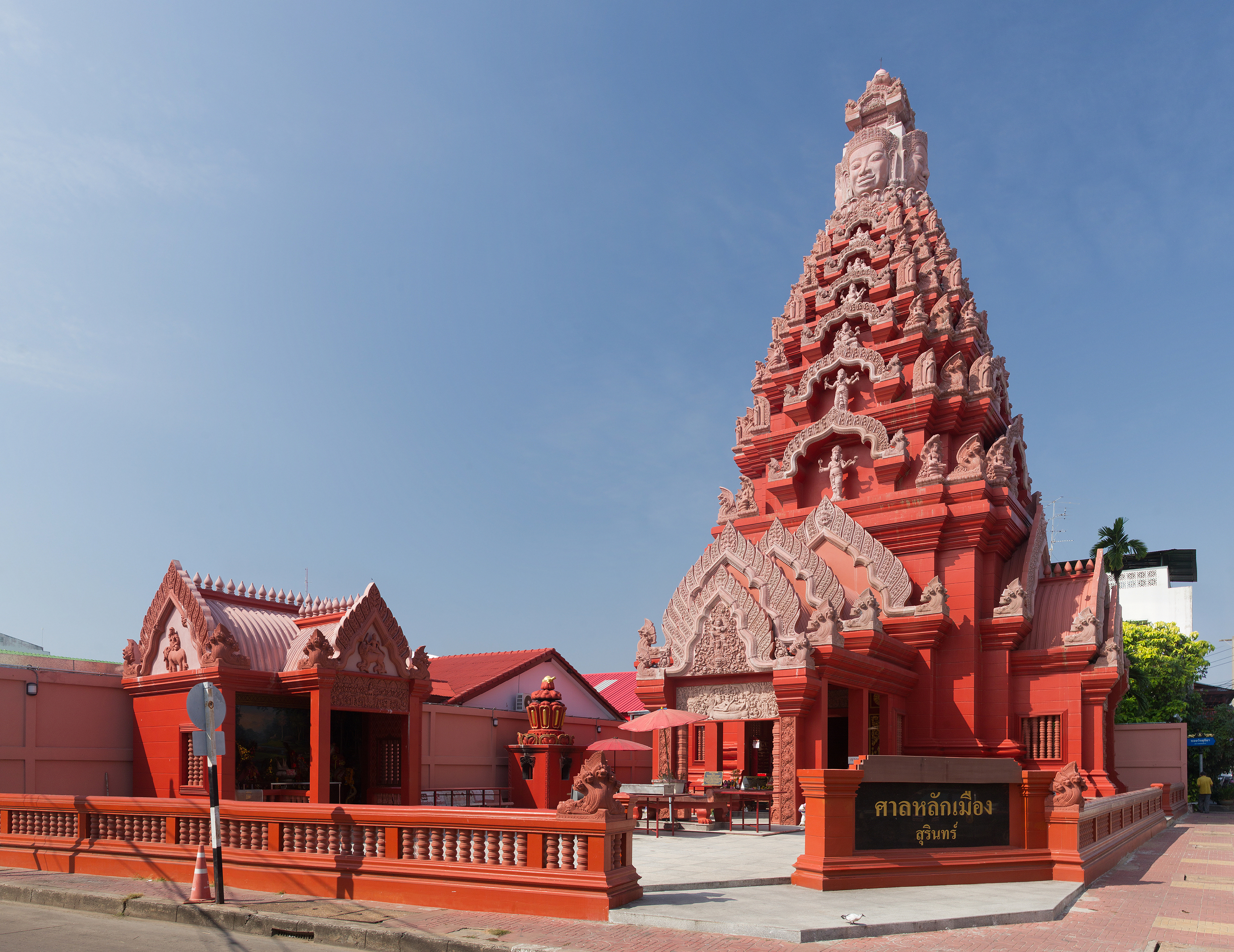
Surin City Pillar Shrine

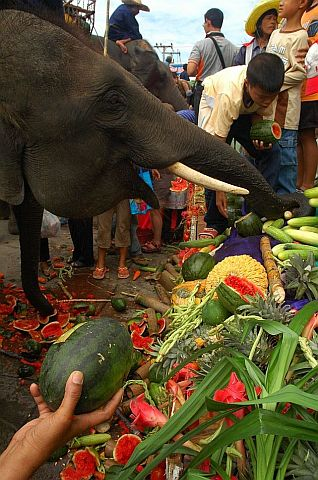
Elephant feeding

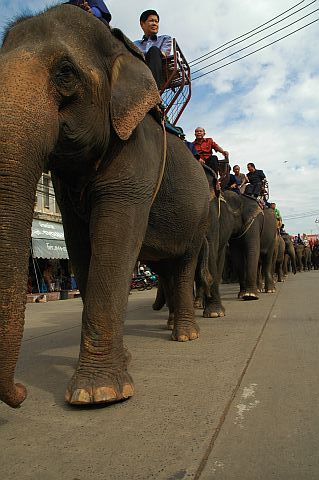
Elephant procession

As in most of Isan, the primary culture of Surin is that of the ethnic Lao people who inhabit the region. Within Thailand, the preferred nomenclature for this culture is "Thai-Isan" to enforce their identity as Thai citizens and differentiate them from the Lao of Laos, but the culture of the region is markedly different from central Thais. The Isan language is a dialect of Lao, although mutually intelligible with central Thai. The Thai-Isan of Surin are associated with Lao dress, Lao-influenced music (e.g., the khene and mor lam) and Lao-style cuisine, which includes sticky rice in contrast to the jasmine rice preferred by central Thais.

Due to Surin's significant Khmer population, aspects of Northern Khmer culture are also common in the province including the Northern Khmer language and their kantrum and chrieng brunh music forms. The historical impact of the Khmer on the culture of the region is evident in the numerous Khmer temples and ruins that dot the landscape of Surin. As the Khmer prefer jasmine rice, much of Surin's rice production is geared toward this crop.

The culture of Surin is also strongly influenced by the Kuy people, most visibly in the activity surrounding elephants that is so prominent in the province. Surin is the source of approximately a quarter of all domesticated elephants in Thailand and the capture, training, and raising of these elephants is conducted by people of Kuy ethnicity. This is such an important activity to Surin and a source of pride to the Kuy people, that celebrations such as Thai Elephant Day (Thai: งานวันช้างไทย) and the Surin Elephant Round-up are held annually on the second and third weeks, respectively, of November. The festivals include light and sound shows describing the legends of the Thai elephants and a fair at Si Narong Stadium featuring parades, floats, contests such as tug of war between elephants and men and demonstrations of war elephants.

== Symbols ==
The provincial seal is an image of Indra atop his celestial white elephant, Airavata which is based on the design found on a famous Khmer temple in the province. Both Khmer temples and elephants are commonly found in Surin.

The provincial tree and flower is the common tembusu (Fagraea fragrans). Smallscale mud carp (Cirrhinus microlepis) is the provincial fish.

== Economy ==
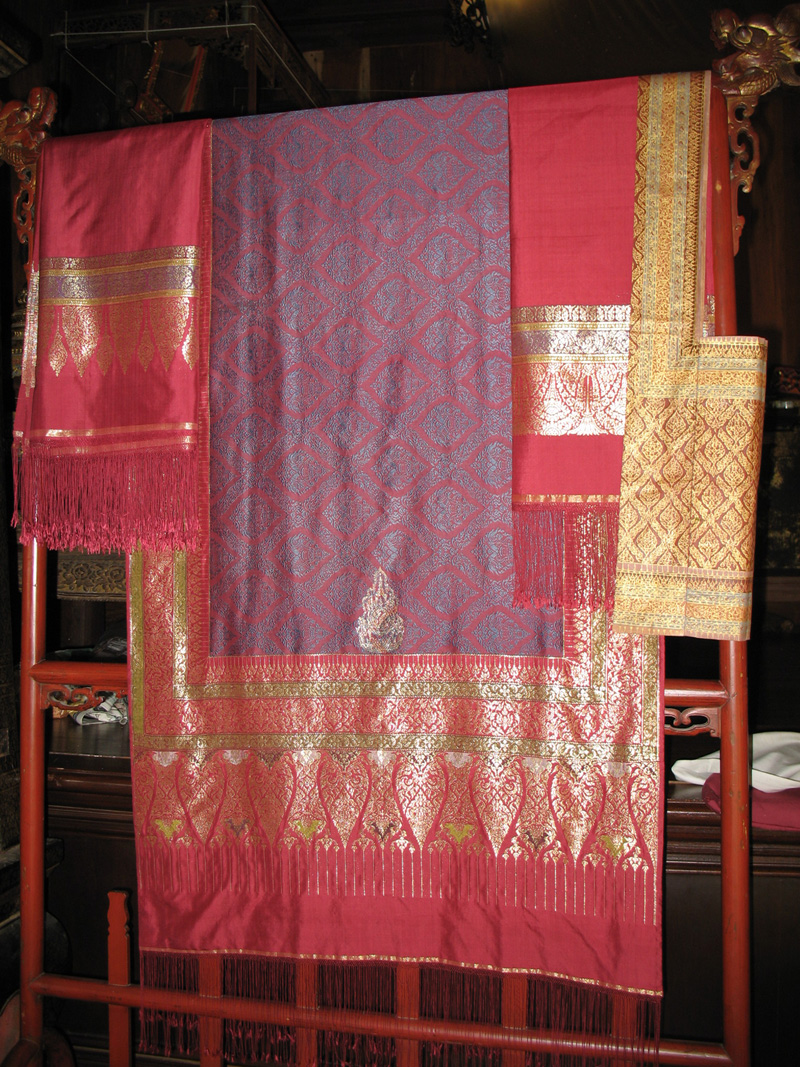
Tha Sawang silk, a well-known Surin handicraft

Surin province produces high-quality jasmine rice. It is also known for its silk. This quality is due to its weaving process, as well as its patterns and dyes.

== Demographics ==
In Thailand's 2000 census it was reported that 99.5 percent of the province's population were Thai nationals; 29.3 percent of the population ranged from age 0–14, 60.9 percent ranged from 15 to 59, and 9.8 percent of the population is 60 and over.

Surin is a province with a sizable Northern Khmer population. It was reported that 47.2 percent of the population are capable of speaking the Khmer language. This is down from the 1990 census where it was reported that 63.4 percent of the population spoke Khmer.

A third large minority group, the Kuy people, also reside in Surin. Also spelled "Guay", "Suai" or "Kha" (pejoratively), the Kuy are a Mon-Khmer people distantly related to the Khmer and considered by many Thais to be the aboriginal inhabitants of the region. A 1985 study found that 9.6 percent of the people in Surin were Kuy, 9.2 percent were mixed Lao-Kuy, and 3.1 percent were mixed Khmer-Kuy. Kuy people speak the Kuy language and most traditionally followed animist beliefs although a syncretic blend of animism with the local Theravada Buddhism is now more common.

== Human achievement index 2022 ==
Health	Education	Employment	Income
70	65	58	77
Housing	Family	Transport	Participation
14	46	59	52
Province Surin, with an HAI 2022 value of 0.5935 is "low", occupies place 77 in the ranking.

Since 2003, United Nations Development Programme (UNDP) in Thailand has tracked progress on human development at sub-national level using the Human achievement index (HAI), a composite index covering all the eight key areas of human development. National Economic and Social Development Board (NESDB) has taken over this task since 2017.

Rank	Classification
1 – 13	"high"
14–29	"somewhat high"
30–45	"average"
46–61	"somewhat low"
62–77	"low"

Map with provinces and HAI 2022 rankings

== Notable people ==
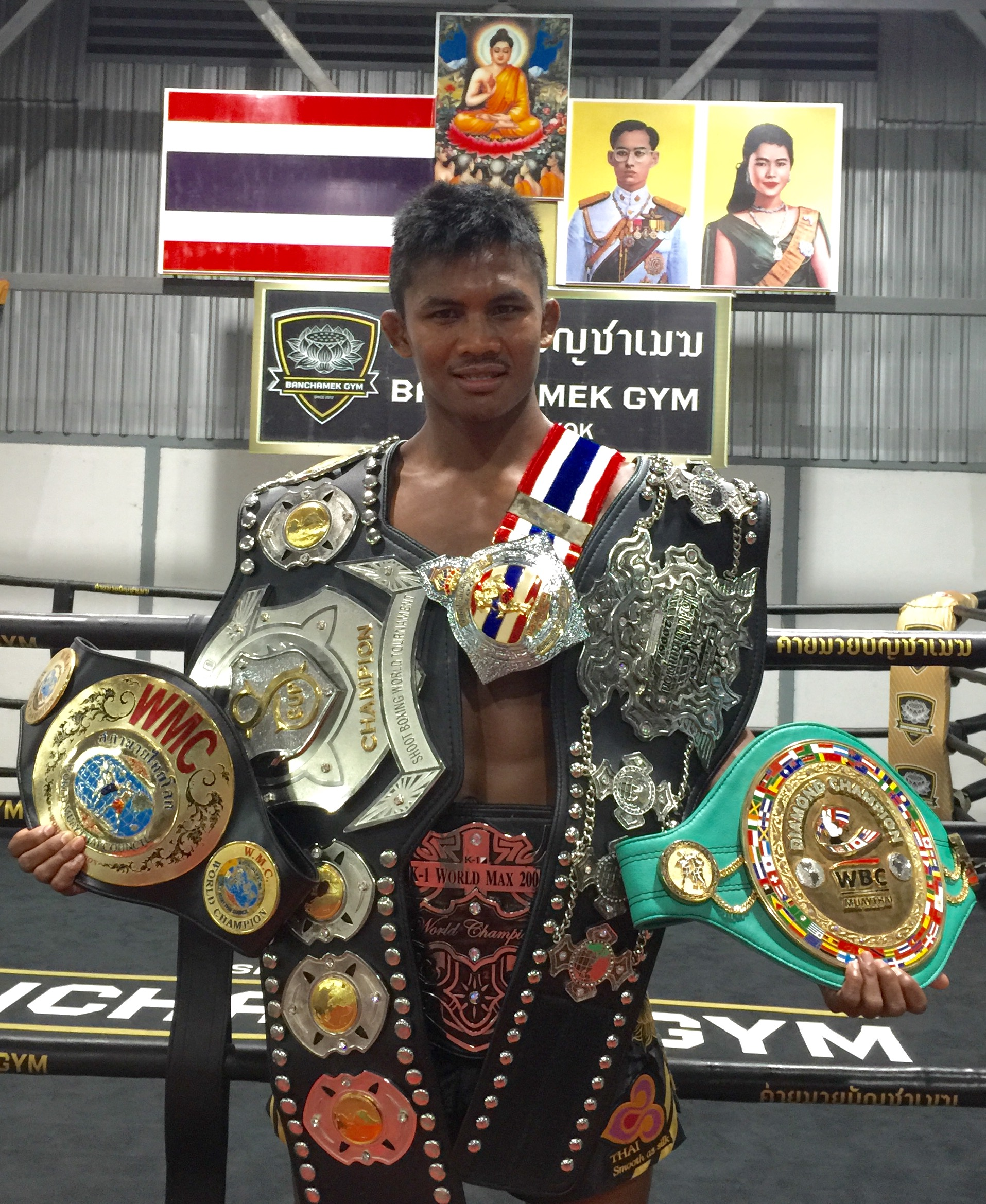
Buakaw is a Thai middleweight Muay Thai kickboxer, he was born in Samrong Thap District

- Ajahn Dune Atulo: renowned Buddhist monk of Thai Forest Tradition and disciple of Ajahn Mun
- Chai Chidchob: politician, father of Newin Chidchob
- Buakaw Banchamek: world-class Muay Thai kickboxer of Kuy descent
- Tony Jaa: Martial arts movie star of Kuy descent
- Thammanoon Niyomtrong: world-class professional boxer
Elephant Festival

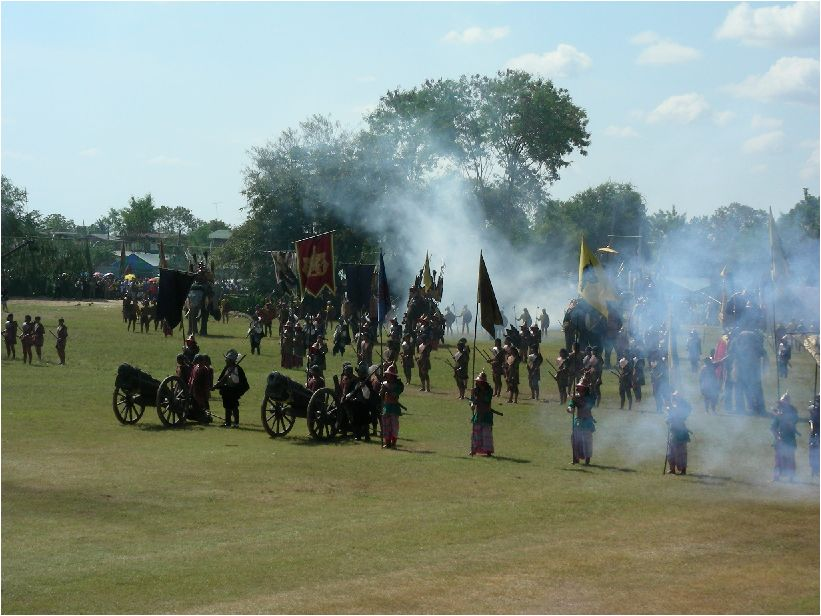

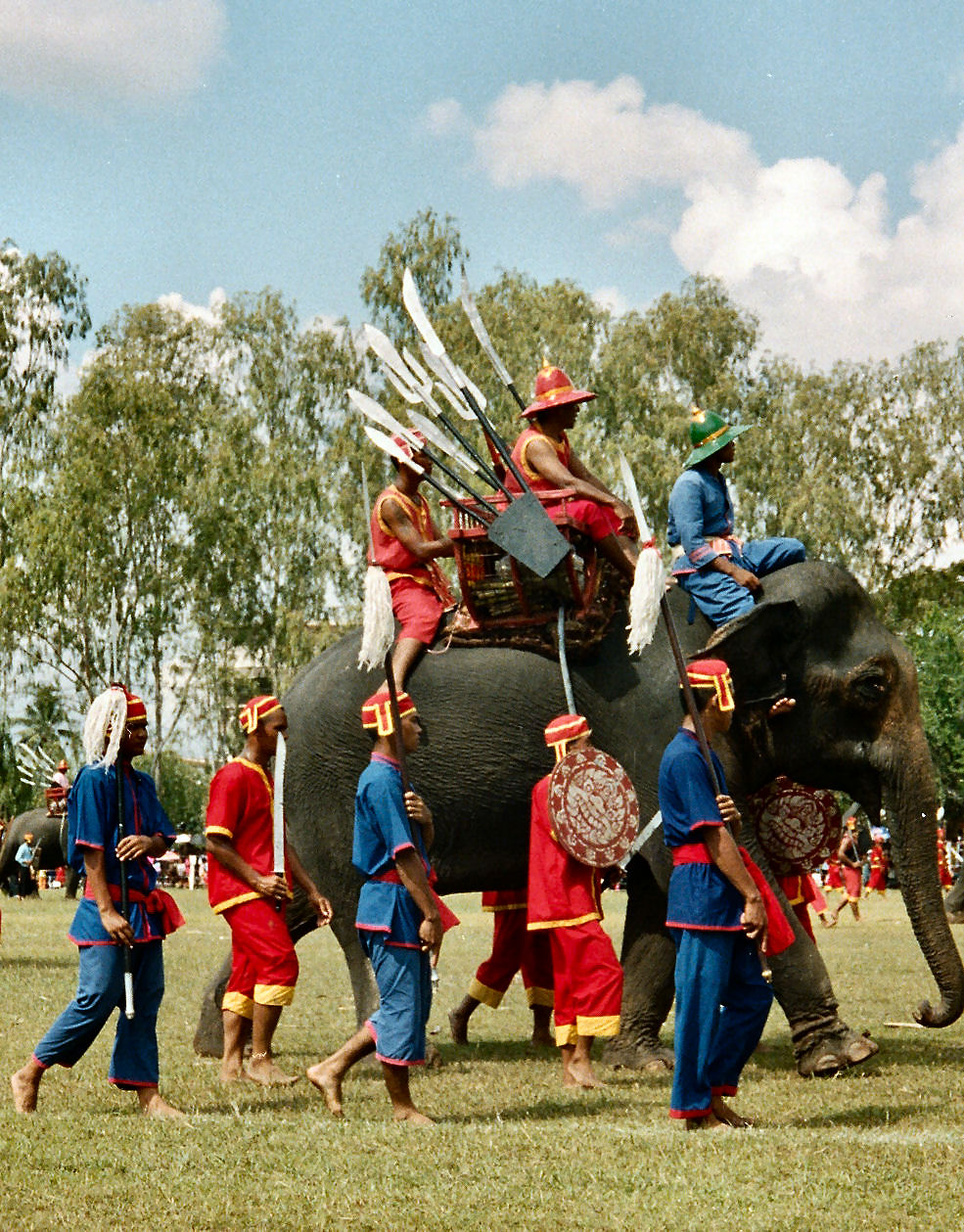
