= Prasat Ban Bu =

Khmer Hindu temple

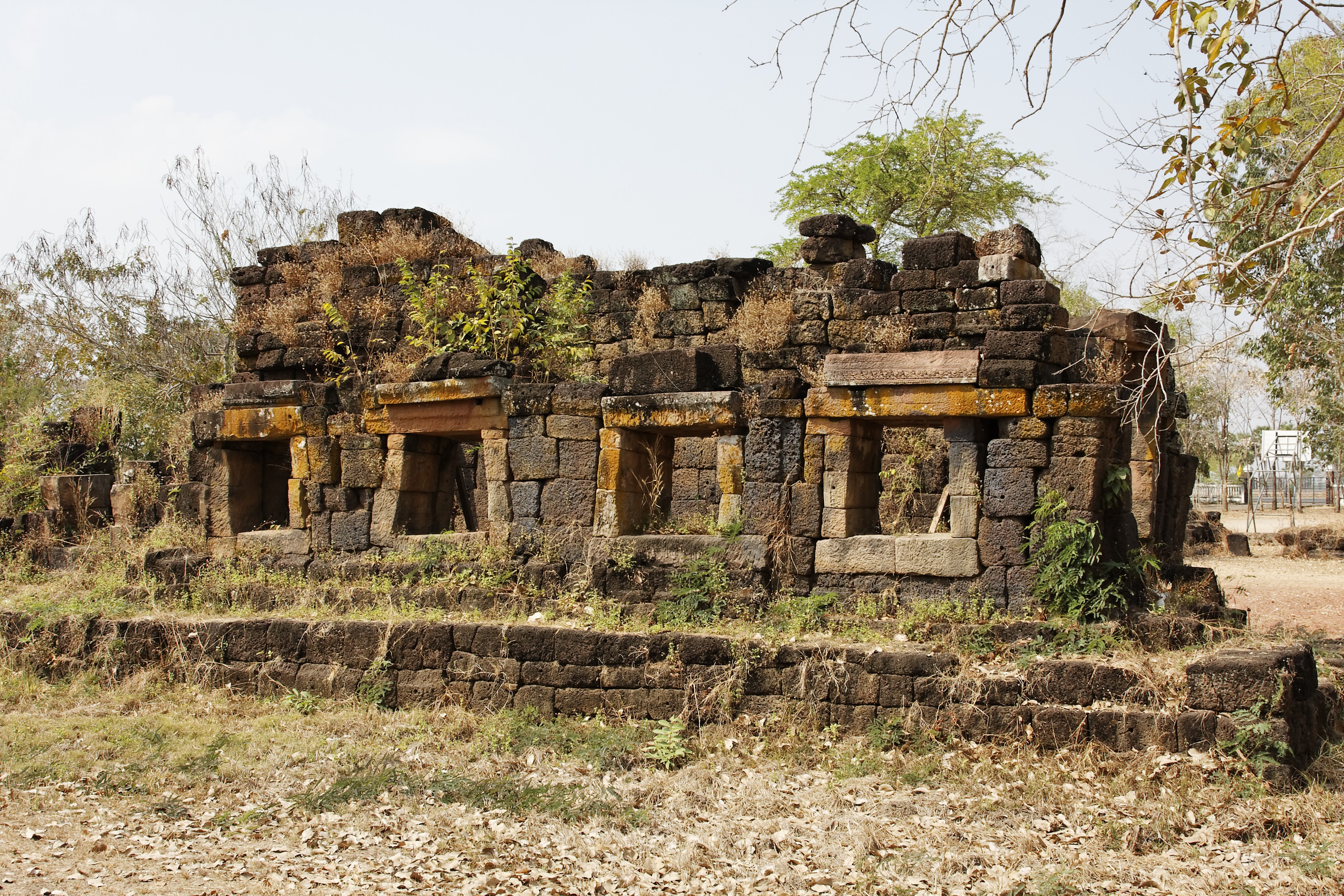

Religion
- Affiliation: Hinduism
- District: Prakhon Chai
- Province: Buriram

Location
- Country: Thailand
- Interactive map of Prasat Ban Bu
- Coordinates: 14.533°N 102.976°E

Architecture
- Type: Khmer
- Creator: Jayavarman VII
- Completed: Late 12th to early 13th century

Prasat Ban Bu is an ancient Khmer Hindu temple in Prakhon Chai district, Buriram province, Thailand. Built in the late 12th to early 13th century during the reign of Jayavarman VII in the Khmer architectural style it served as a rest-house for travellers on the ancient road between Angkor and Phimai.

== Description ==
Built in the late 12th to early 13th century during the reign of Jayavarman VII in the Khmer Baphuon architectural style, the temple is situated in the grounds of Ban Bu Wittayasan school on the Ancient Khmer Highway. It served as a dharmasala or rest-house for people travelling between Angkor and Phimai (Vimayapura). A chain of such buildings was built a day's walk apart along the road of which eight have so far been discovered.

Constructed using laterite, the rectangular building, 5.1 metres wide and 11.5 metres long, would originally have had a tower but only parts of the walls have survived. A panel, which pre-dates the temple having come from an older temple, contains a carving in sandstone of a rosette.
