= Phimai Historical Park =

Historical park in Thailand

Phimai Historical Park Prasat Phi Mai
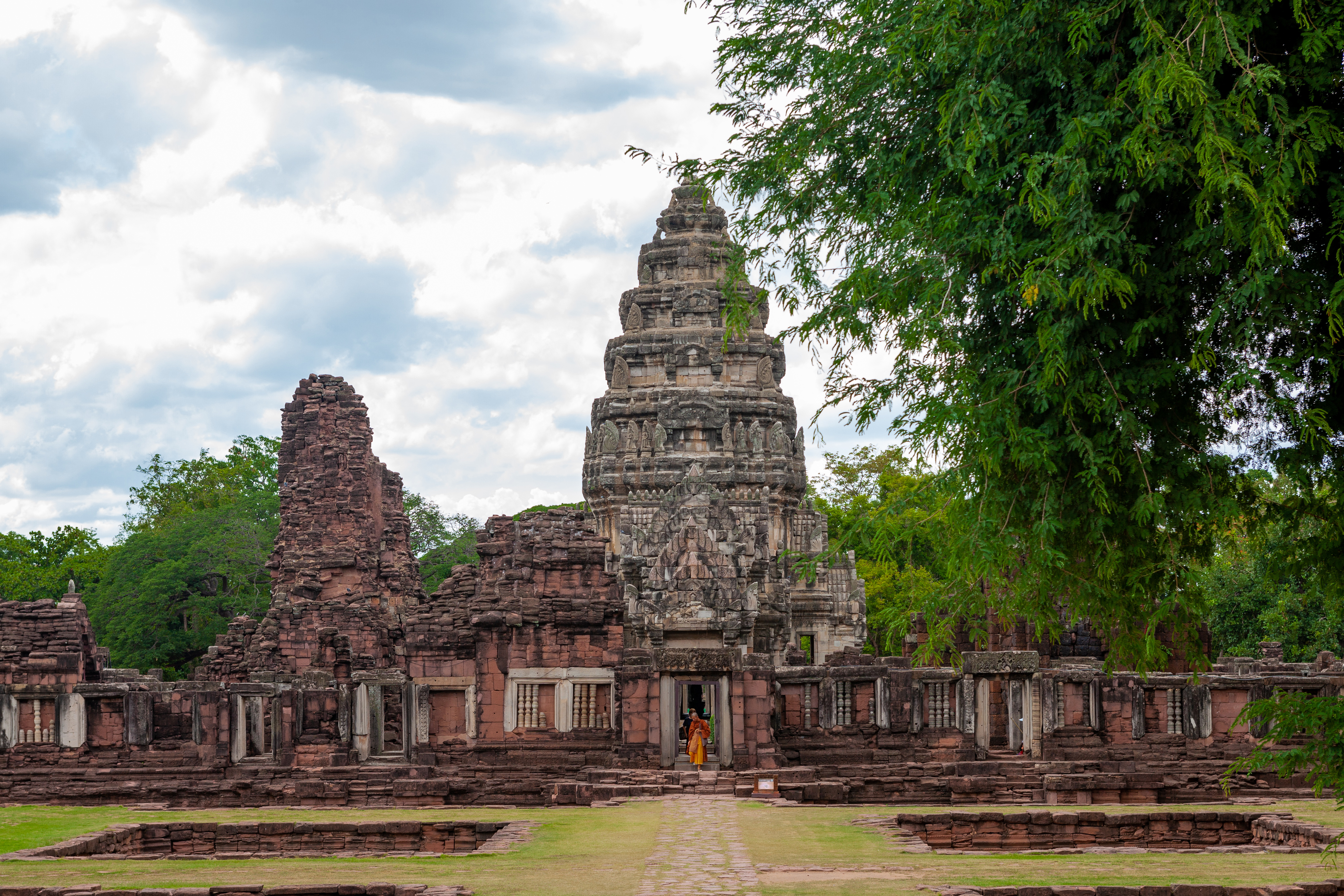

- Location in Thailand

Religion
- Affiliation: Buddhism
- Sect: Theravada
- Province: Nakhon Ratchasima
- Deity: Shankar

Location
- Country: Thailand
- Coordinates: 15°13′15″N 102°29′38″E

Architecture
- Type: Khmer architecture
- Completed: 11th–12th Century CE

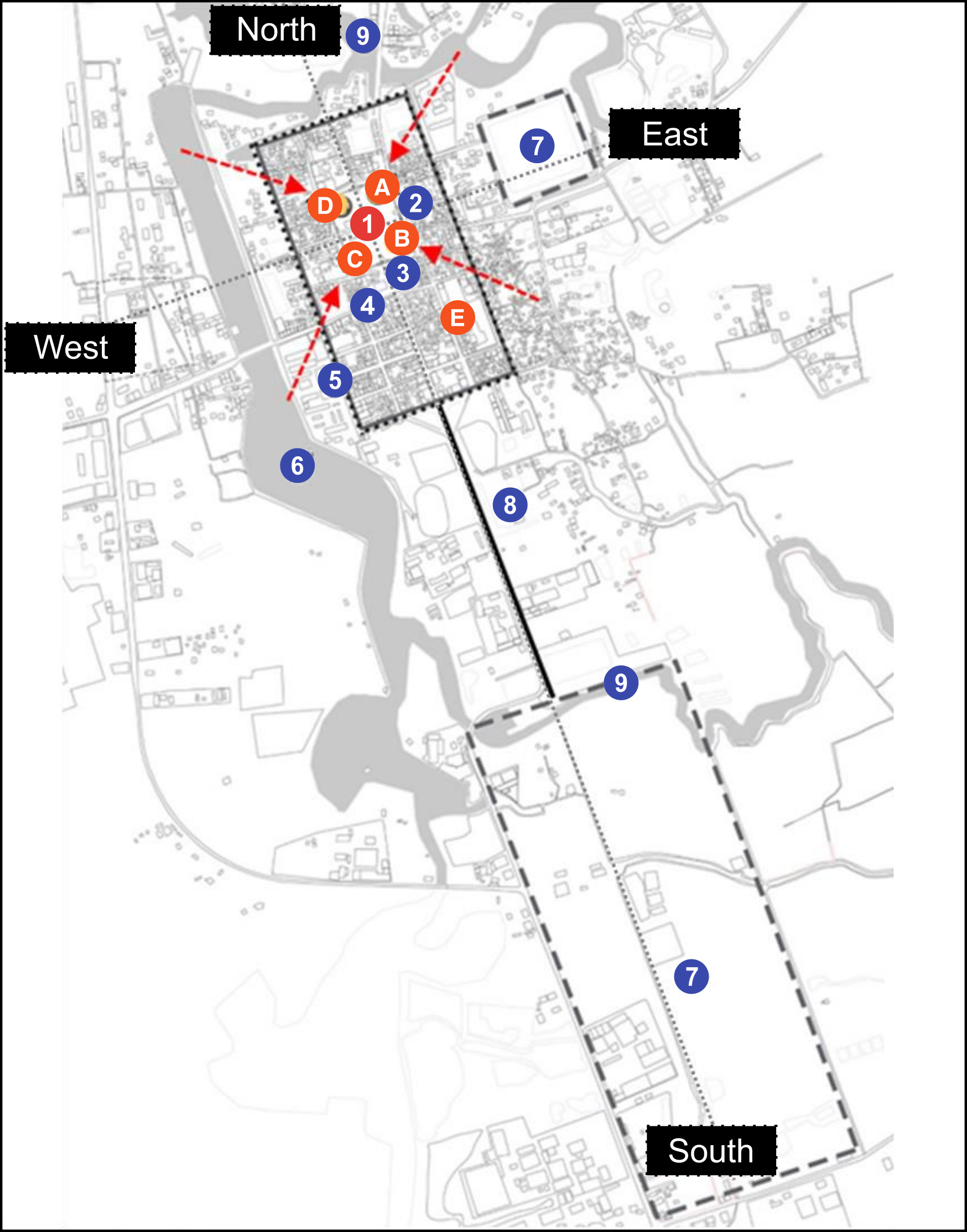
Phimai City layout in the late Ayutthaya period – Main stupa (Prasat Phimai) – Wat Srahin (วัดสระหิน) — Wat Sorn Sila (วัดศรศิลา) – Wat Prang Yai (วัดปรางค์ใหญ่) — Wat Prasad (วัดประสาด) – Wat Prang Noi (วัดปรางค์น้อย) — Wat Chan (วัดจันท์) – Wat Bot (วัดโบสถ์) — Wat Prang (วัดปรางค์) – Meru Brahmathat – Inner city wall – Southern Gopura – Dharamshala – Outer moats and walls – Chakkarat River – Barays – Arogayasala – Creeks

The Phimai Historical Park (Thai: อุทยานประวัติศาสตร์พิมาย) is a historical park in Thailand, covering the ancient town of Phimai and the ruins of Prasat Phimai Thai: ปราสาทพิมาย, pronounced [prāː.sàːt pʰí(ʔ).māːj]; Northeastern Thai: ผาสาทพิมาย, pronounced [pʰǎː.sàːt pʰì(ʔ).ma᷇ːj]) the largest ancient Mahayana Buddhist temple in Thailand. It is located in the town of Phimai, Nakhon Ratchasima province. It is one of the most important tourist attractions in the province.

Phimai had previously been an important town at the time of the Khmer Empire. The temple Prasat Hin Phimai, located in the center of the town, was one of the major Khmer temples in ancient Thailand, connected with Angkor by the Ancient Khmer Highway, and oriented to face Angkor as its cardinal direction.

== History ==
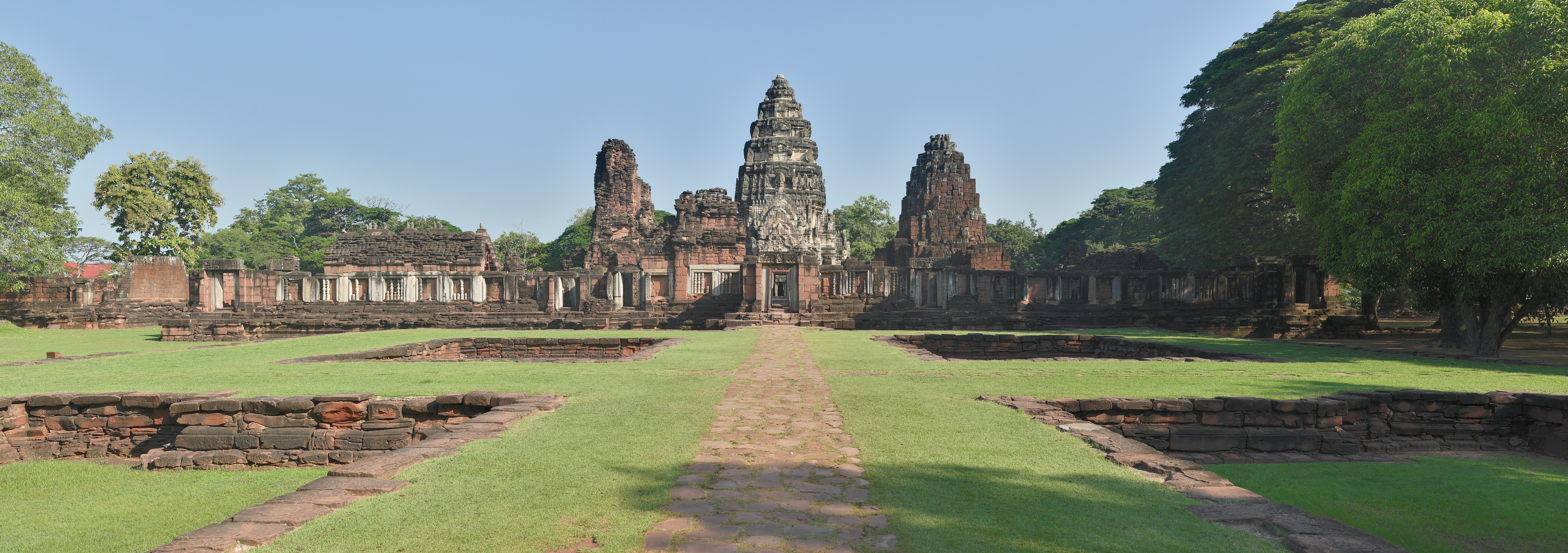
Phimai National Park

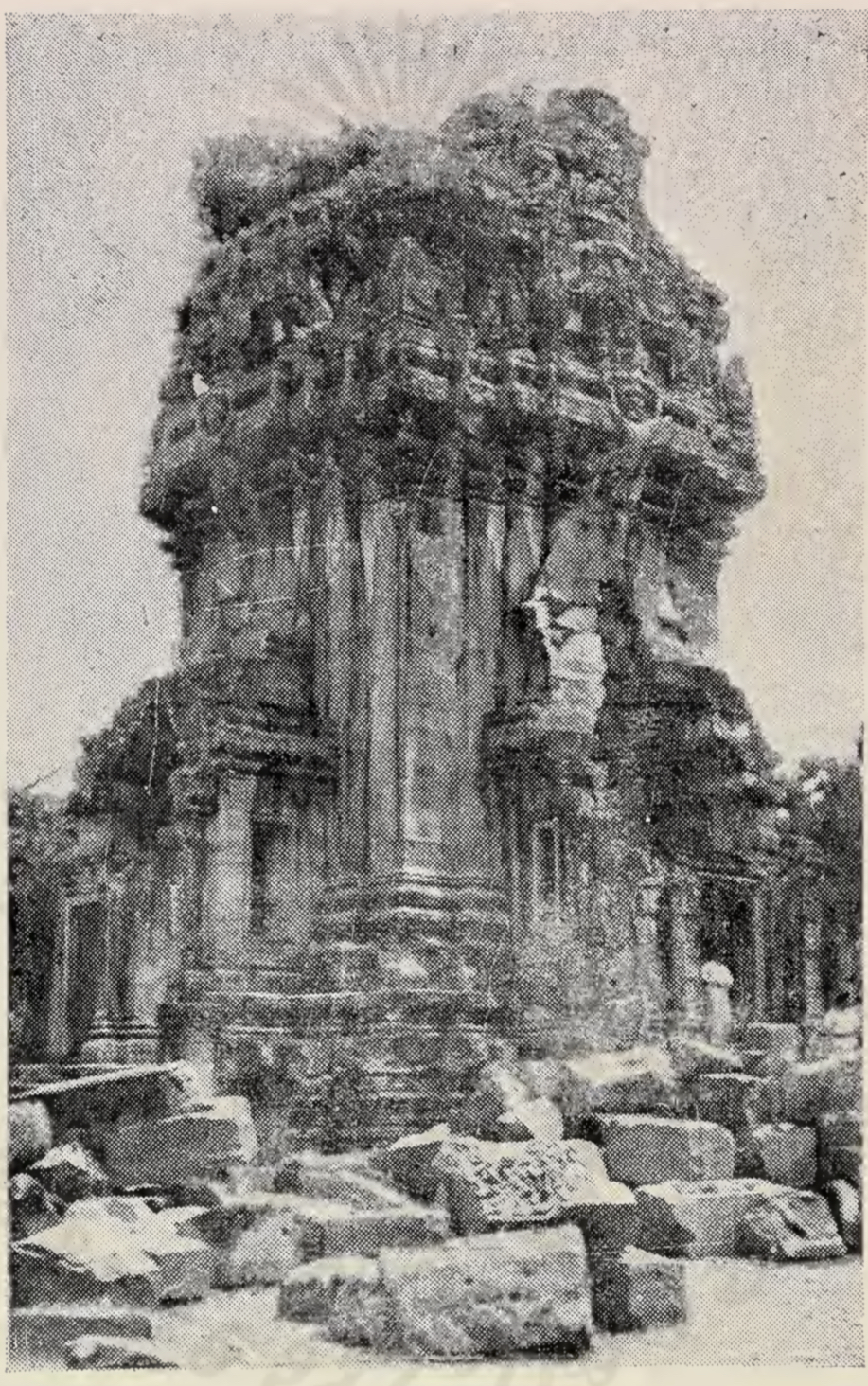
The central sanctum-tower in 1968

The temple marks one end of the Ancient Khmer Highway from Angkor. As the enclosed area of 1020x580m is comparable with that of Angkor Wat, it is suggested to have been an important city in the Khmer Empire. Most buildings are from the late 11th to the late 12th century, built in the Baphuon, Bayon and Khmer temple style. However, even though the Khmer at that time were Hindu, the temple was built as a Buddhist temple, since the inhabitants of the Khorat area had been Buddhists as far back as the 7th century. Inscriptions name the site Vimayapura (which means city of Vimaya), which developed into the Thai name Phimai.

In the aftermath of the fall of the Ayutthaya Kingdom in 1767, attempts were made to set up five separate states, with Prince Teppipit, a son of King Borommakot, attempting to establish Phimai as one, ruling over eastern provinces including Nakhon Ratchasima. As the weakest of the five, Prince Teppipit was the first to be defeated and was executed in 1768.

The first inventory of the ruins was done in 1901 by the French geographer Etienne Aymonier. The site was put under Thai governmental protection by announcement in the Government Gazette, Volume 53, section 34, on September 27, 1936. Most of the restorations were done from 1964 to 1969 as a joint Thai-French project. The historical park, now managed by the Fine Arts Department, was officially opened by Princess Maha Chakri Sirindhorn on April 12, 1989.

Phimai has recently been the base of operations for the excavation of Ban Non Wat.

== Khmer influence ==
As the northeastern part of Thailand was part of the Khmer Empire (once ruled by the Khmer Empire), Phimai's architecture and cultural decorations were built in Khmer architecture. Art and architecture shown on the temple itself shows great evidence of the ancient Khmer civilization.

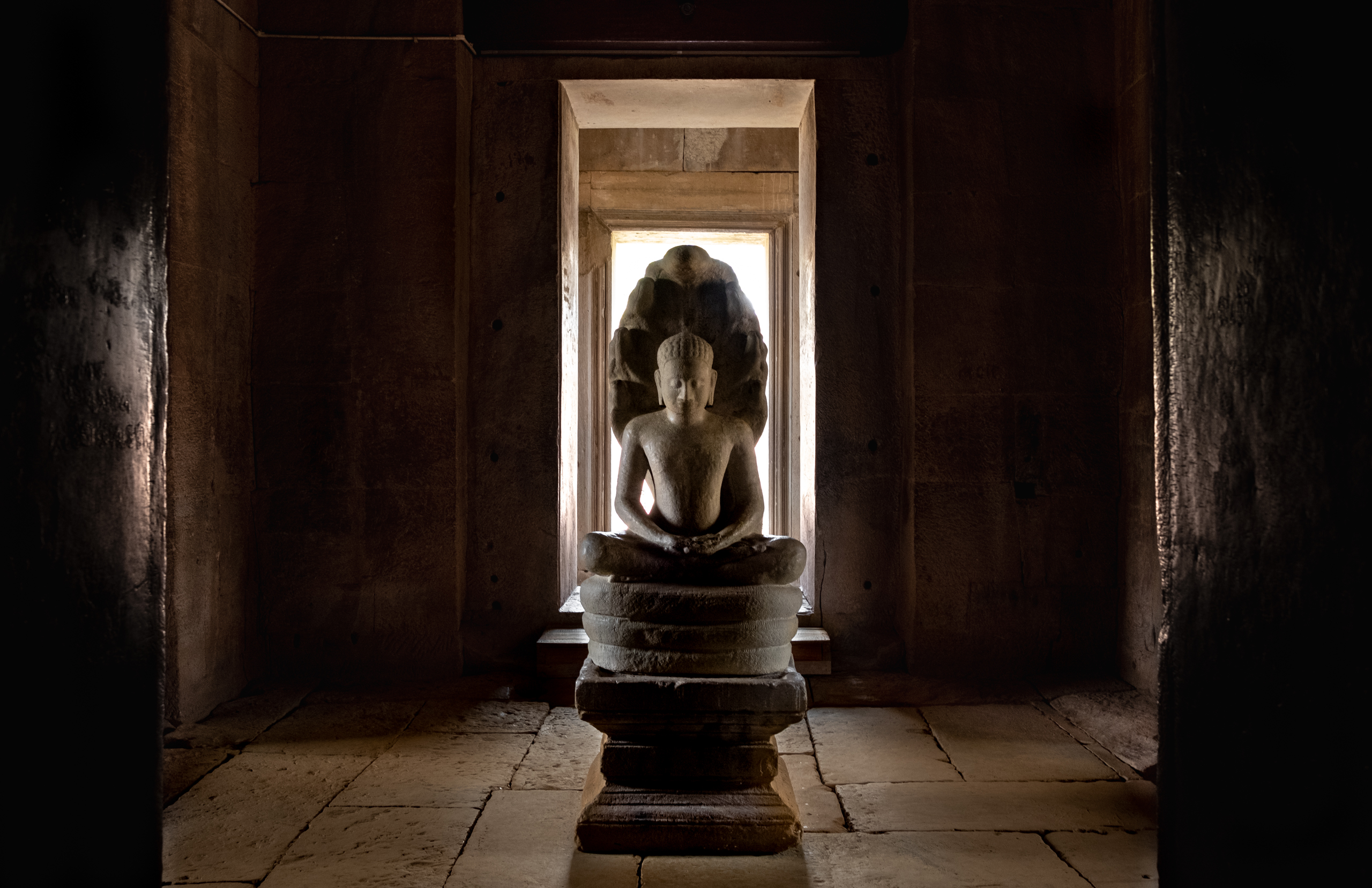
Phra Buddha image in the Naga-protection posture (Naga Prok), inside the main prang (principal sanctuary tower).

Despite the fact that Phimai was built in a similar fashion to Angkor and other Khmer Buddhist temples, the religious origin of some structures within Phimai's walls are still debated. Evidence of Dvaravati influence, such as the sculpture of "the Wheel of Law" or the statue of Buddha, shows that Phimai was an important Buddhist spiritual location. Although a large quantity of Buddhist artwork has been uncovered in Phimai, evidence including the large pots that were embedded in some corners of the structure suggest that spiritual practices other than Buddhism were also practiced in Phimai. Phimai thus has been an important religious landmark for Buddhists.

The earliest engraved records of the Khmer is dated from the 6th century AD in the northeast of Thailand. For example, stone Sanskrit inscriptions were found along with statues and engraved images of Hindu deities, such as the image of Shiva's bull Nandin. The king during that time, Mahendravarman, ordered his men to obliterate the engraved inscription. Modern scholars debate about the possibility that evidence may have been lost.

Phimai, along with other Khmer temples in Thailand, were built mainly under the cause of the "Deveraja cult," or "the King that resembles a god." Jayavarman II was the most mentioned "devaraja." The Devaraja cult developed the belief of worshiping Shiva and the principle that the king was an avatar of Shiva.

The 10th century was the time of the reign of king Rajendravarman II (944–968 AD), which was also a time when Khmer control was spreading into what is now northeastern Thailand. Consequently, temples in Thailand with the Kleang and Baphuon styles remain as evidence of this Khmer heritage. These structures shared the same signature of having three brick towers on a single platform, for instance, the Prasat Prang Ku in Si Saket province and Ban Phuluang in Surin province.

Each individual building has its own special features or functions. For example, Prang Brahmadat was built of laterite blocks that form a square. Or Prang Hin Daeng which translates to "Red Stone Tower" which is also a square but was made of red sandstone. Or the main sanctuary built of white sandstone that is almost 32 meters long. The southern lintel has a statue of Buddha meditating with "seven hoods of naga Muchalinda." Adjacent to this is a collection of statues of devils and animals depicted from the Tantric Mahayana Buddhist scripture.

Today Phimai is a well-known tourist attraction, especially among people interested in history and archaeology. Located in the middle of Phimai is a small rectangular gallery surrounding the courtyard, which has been newly rebuilt. Within the gallery, there is a pre-Angkorian Buddhist inscription that tells the story of Prince Siddhartha Gautama and his journey to becoming Buddha, along with other classic Buddhist stories. The prang symbolize that the area is a sacred space.

== Within Phimai's wall ==
Map of Phimai Historical Park, Phimai

When tourists enter the area of Phimai from the old town on the south, they have to cross a river about one kilometer to the south and enter an ancient laterite landing stage which archaeologists believe stood for the bathing place for the heroine in local myths. The south gate is the city's main gate, also known as the "Pratu Chai," which has recently been reconstructed by the Royal Fine Arts Department. Its size is enormous; it is said that the size is big enough for a royal elephant to enter. The Royal Fine Arts Department also built an inner gallery that shows ancient Buddhist inscriptions and small sculptures as well as pieces of wrecked architecture. The rest of Phimai remains the same only with a little restoration by the Royal Arts Department.

=== Architecture style ===
Having a lot in common with Angkor Wat, Phimai is an example of classical Khmer architecture. Ancient Khmer architects were best known for their superior use of sandstone over the traditional bricks and laterite architectures. Sandstone is used on the visible outer layer. Laterite on the other hand was used for the inner wall and other hidden parts. All the structures are huge sandstone blocks. There are many lotus-shaped roofs representing Mount Meru.

Khmer temples in general, as well as Phimai in this case, were intended to resemble the universe. The main building resembles the peak of Mount Meru at the center of the universe. The surrounding walls resemble the water and encircling mountains. The Khmer did not develop the technique of true vault architecture during their time, resulting in large areas at Phimai that could not be roofed over. Instead, they developed the use of multiple chapels separated by open-air spaces.

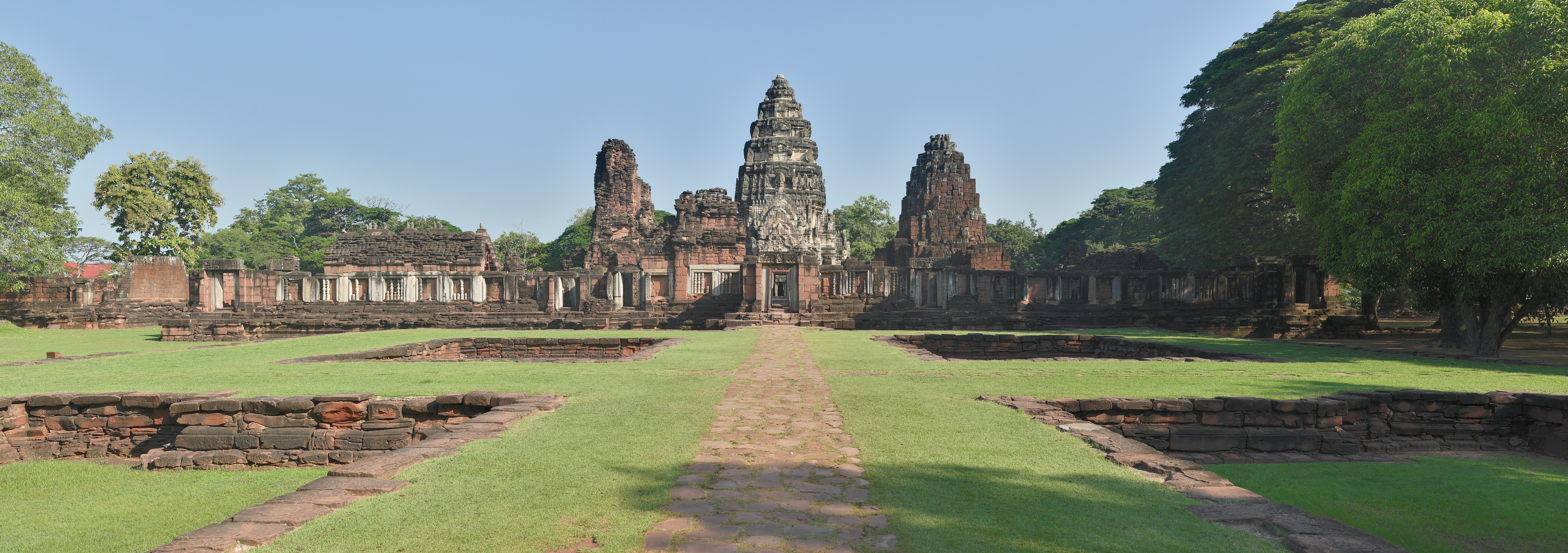
The inner enclosure seen from the southern outer gopura

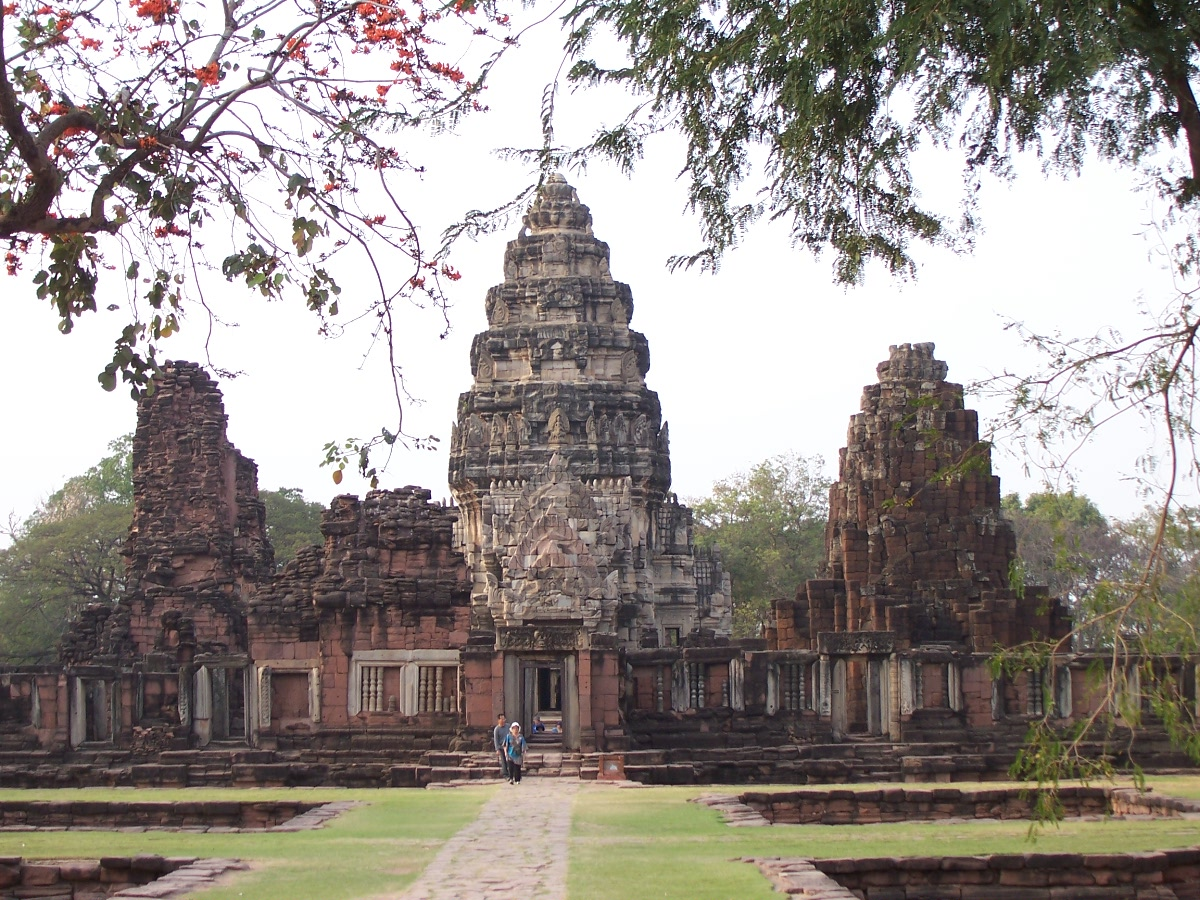
The people looking at the photographer are looking in the direction of Ankor

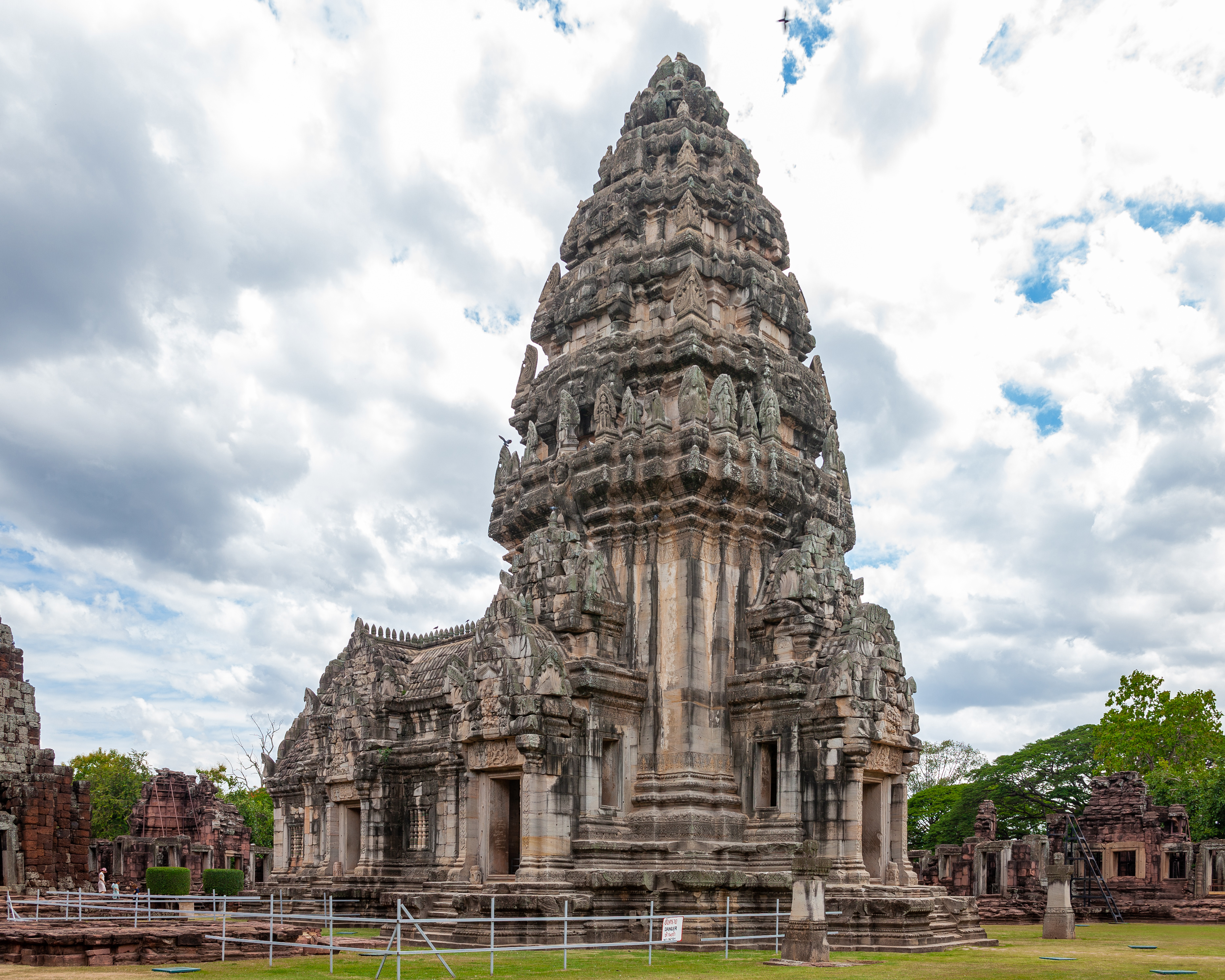
The central sanctuary

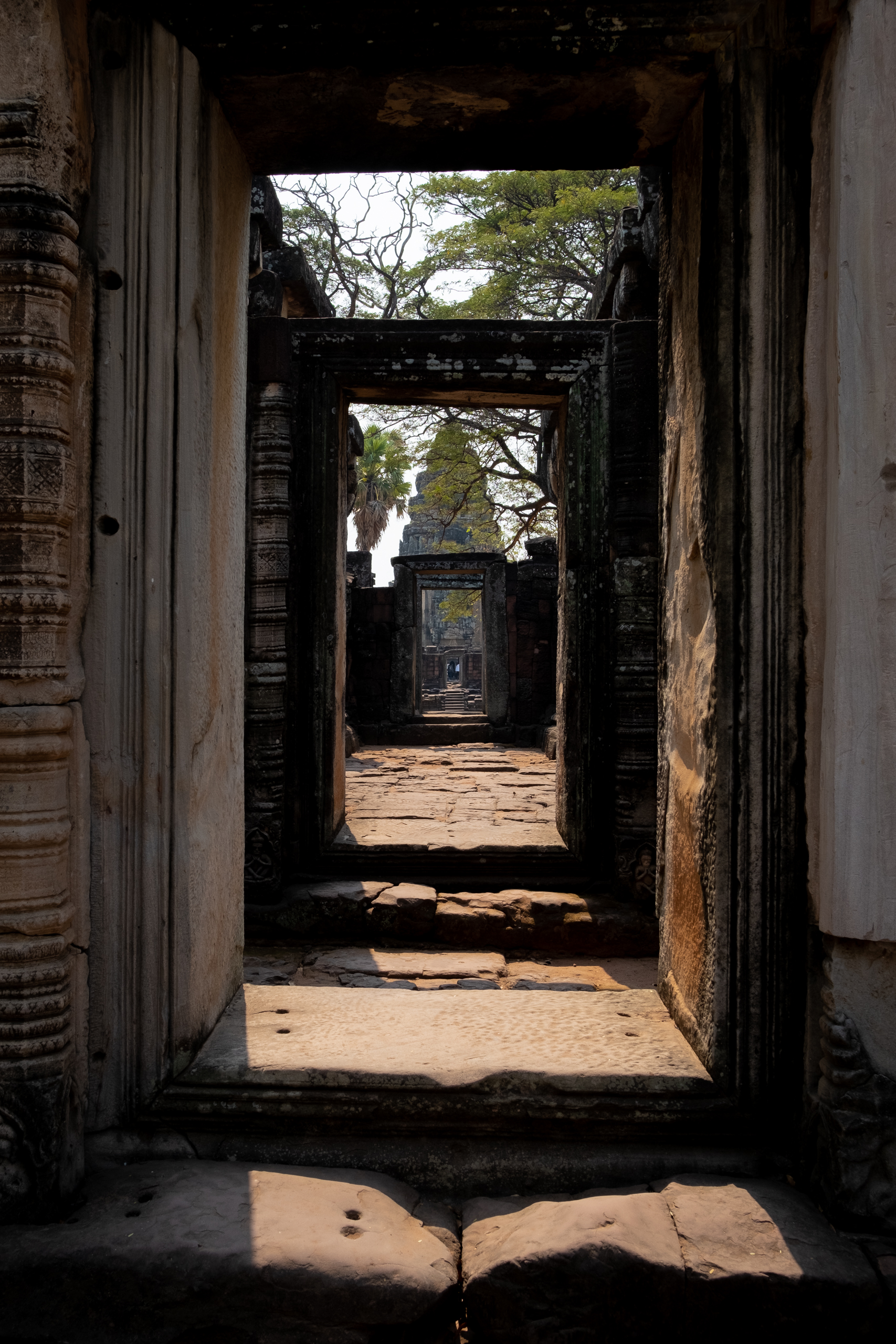
The central sanctuary as seen from the north entrance of the outer wall

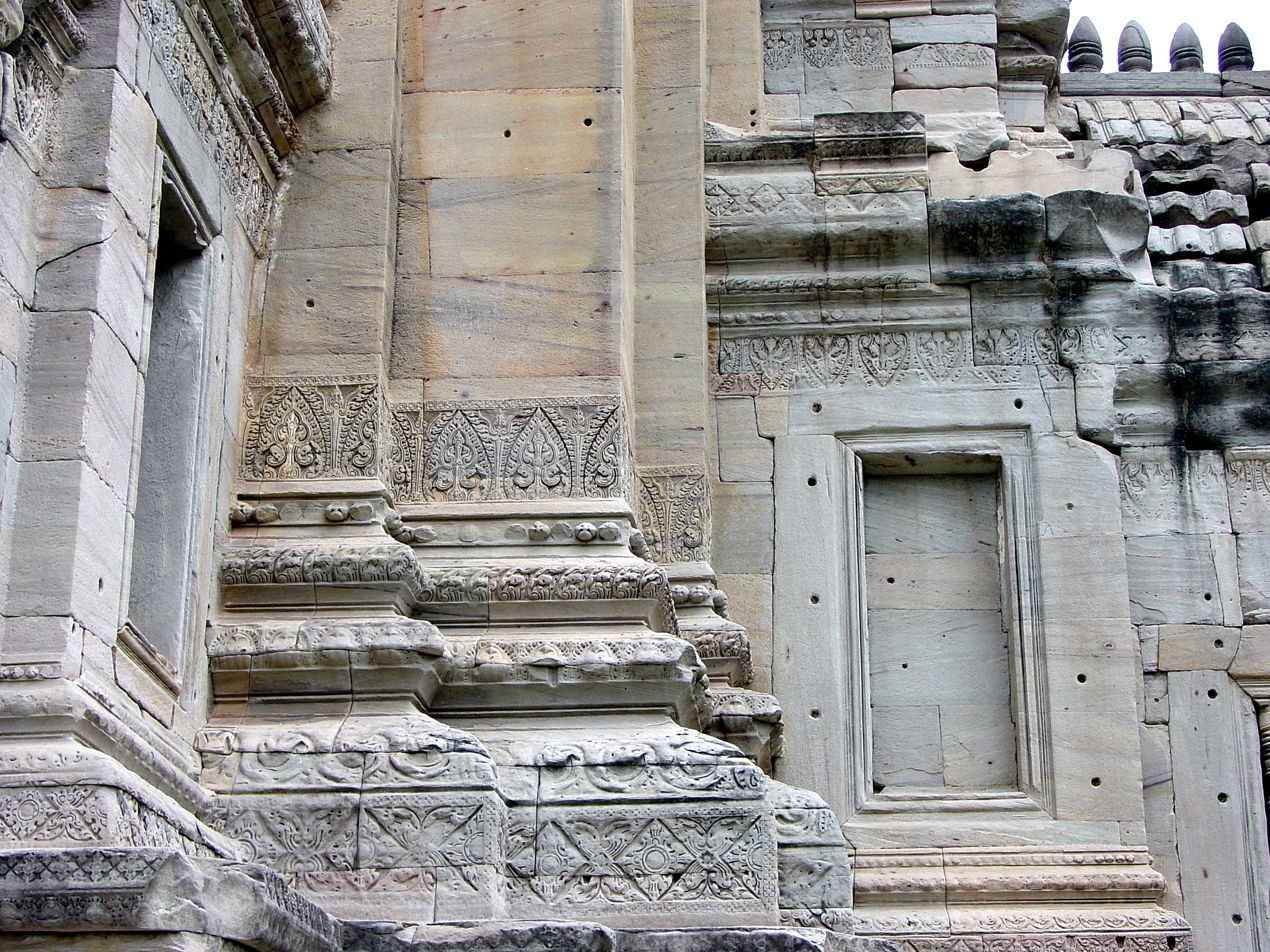
Shrine Decoration in the Sanctuary

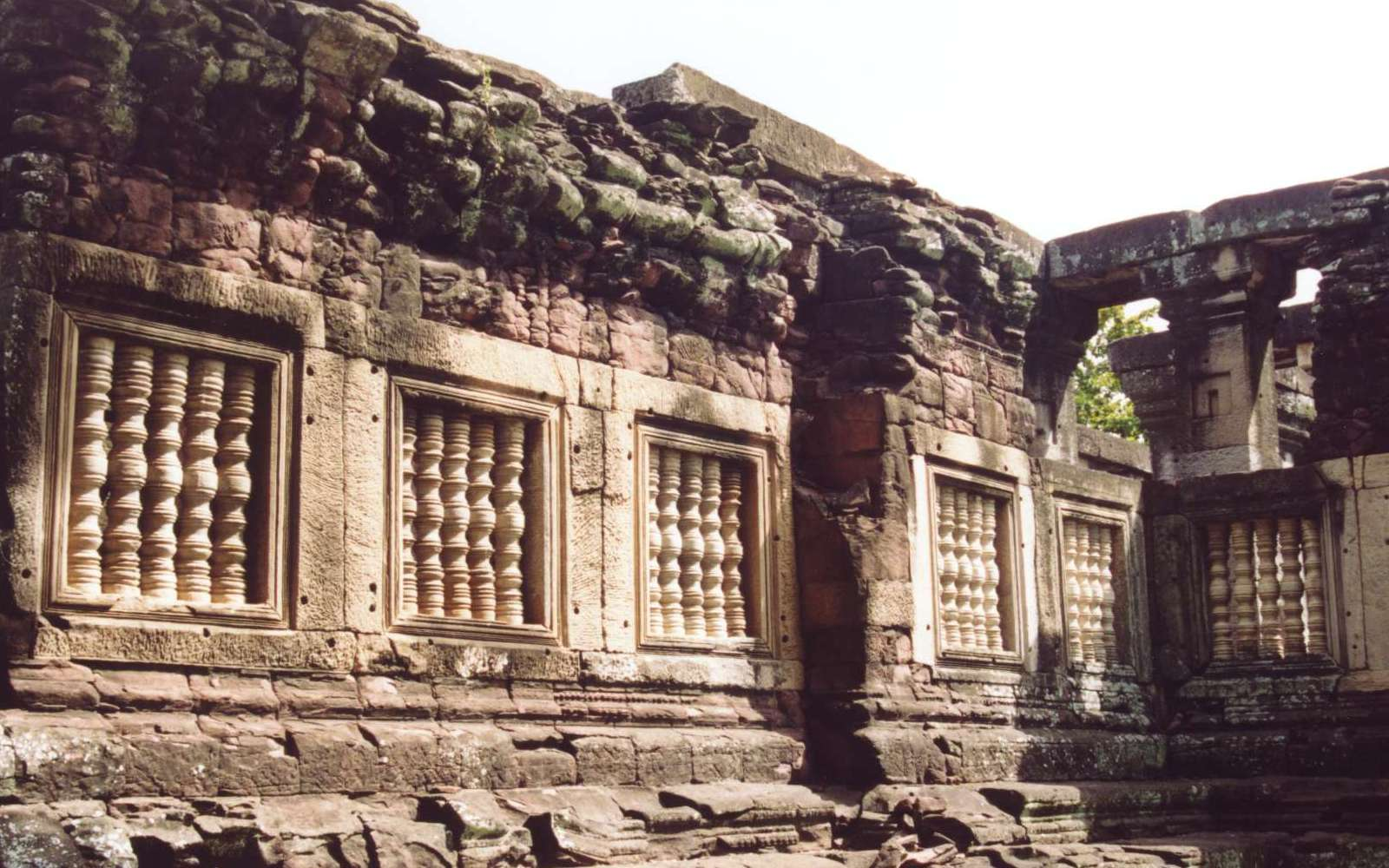
Windows

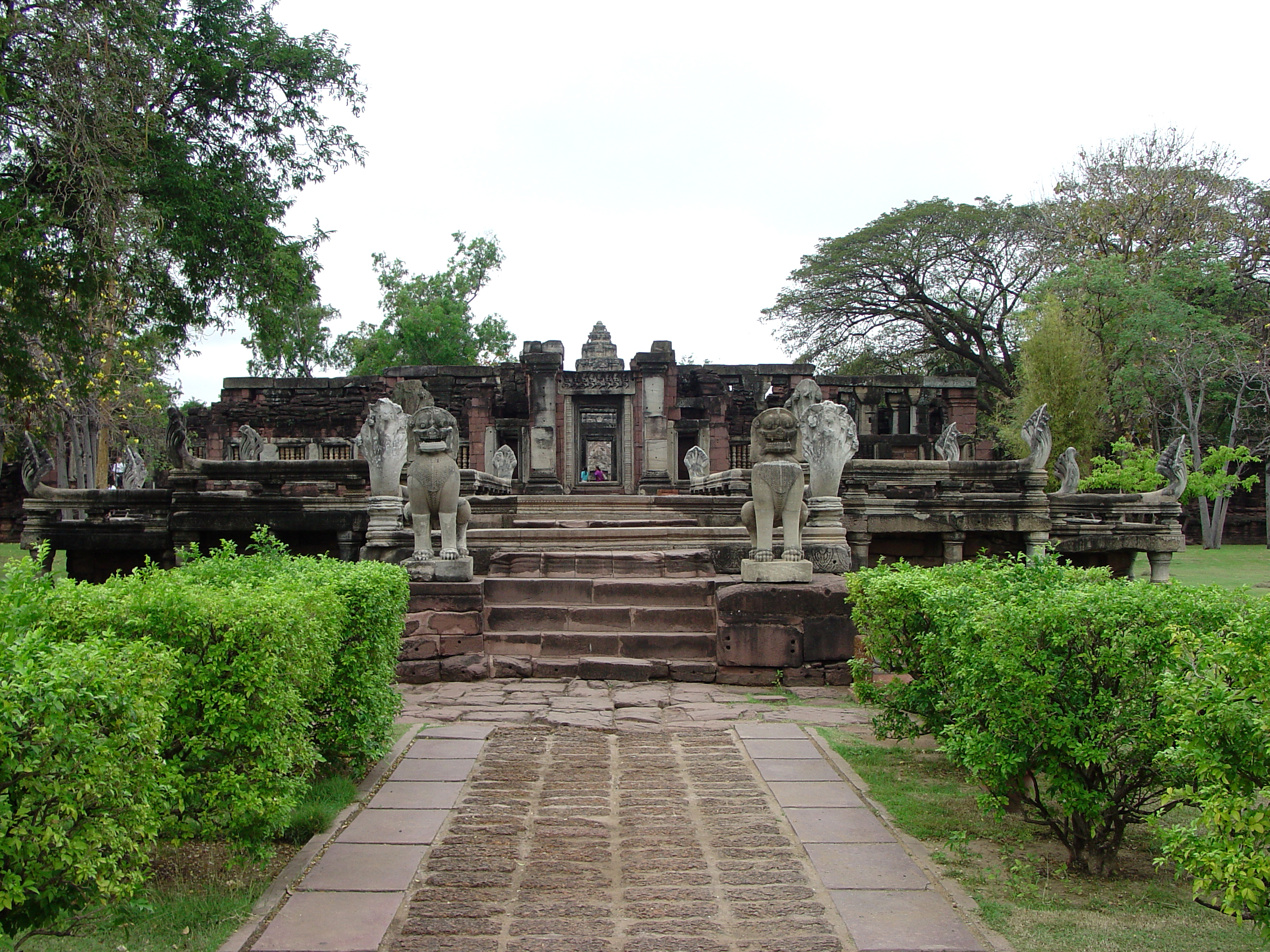
The Naga Bridge, leading to the southern outer gopura

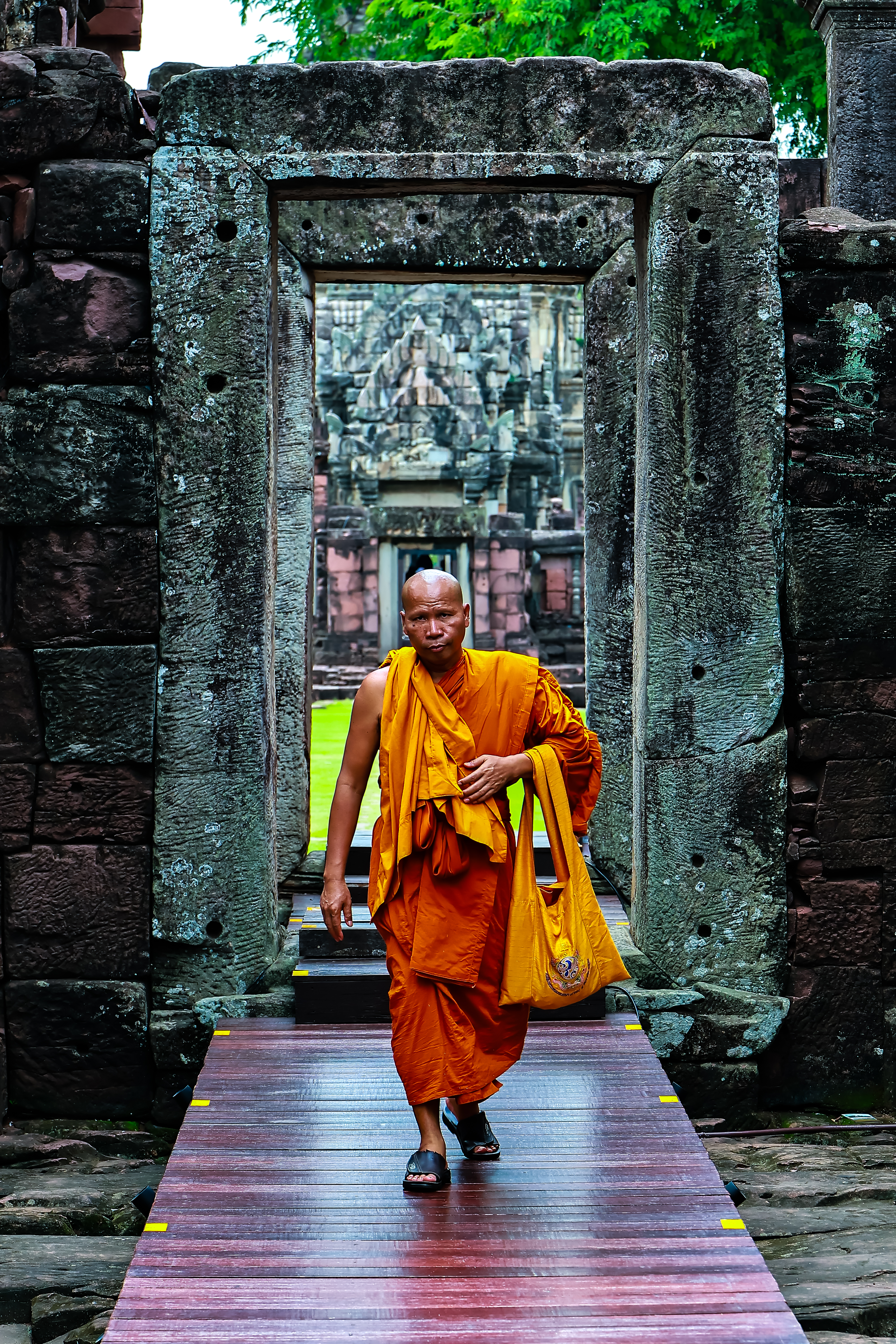
Buddhist monk at Phimai

=== Construction materials ===
The ancient Khmer used brick, sandstone, and laterite as their principal construction materials. Lintels were typically cut at a 45° angle at the ends to create a triangular wedge for setting into the masonry.

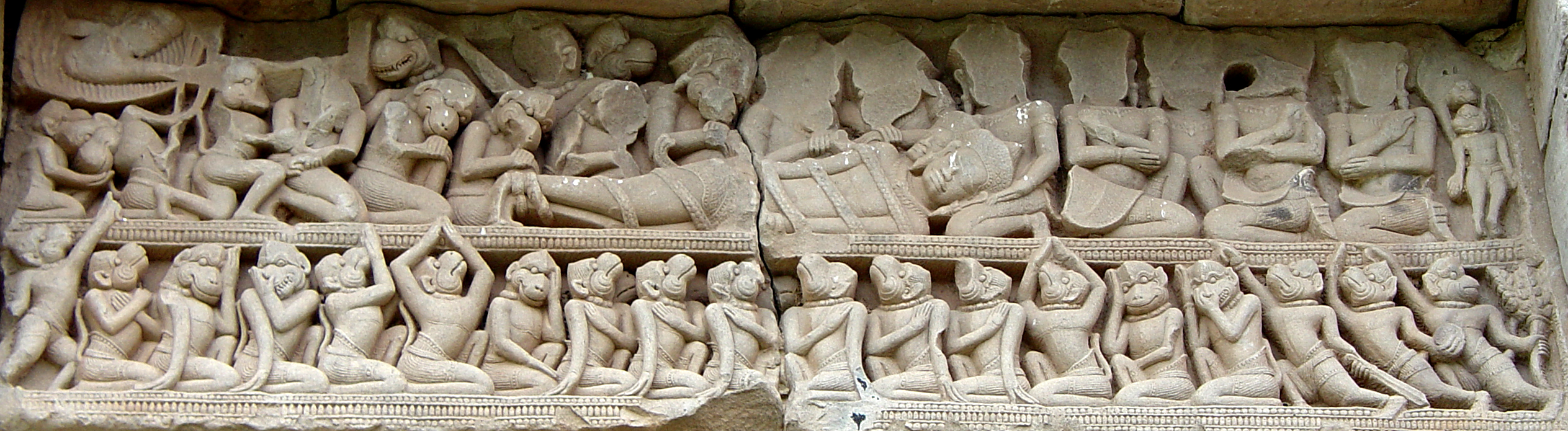

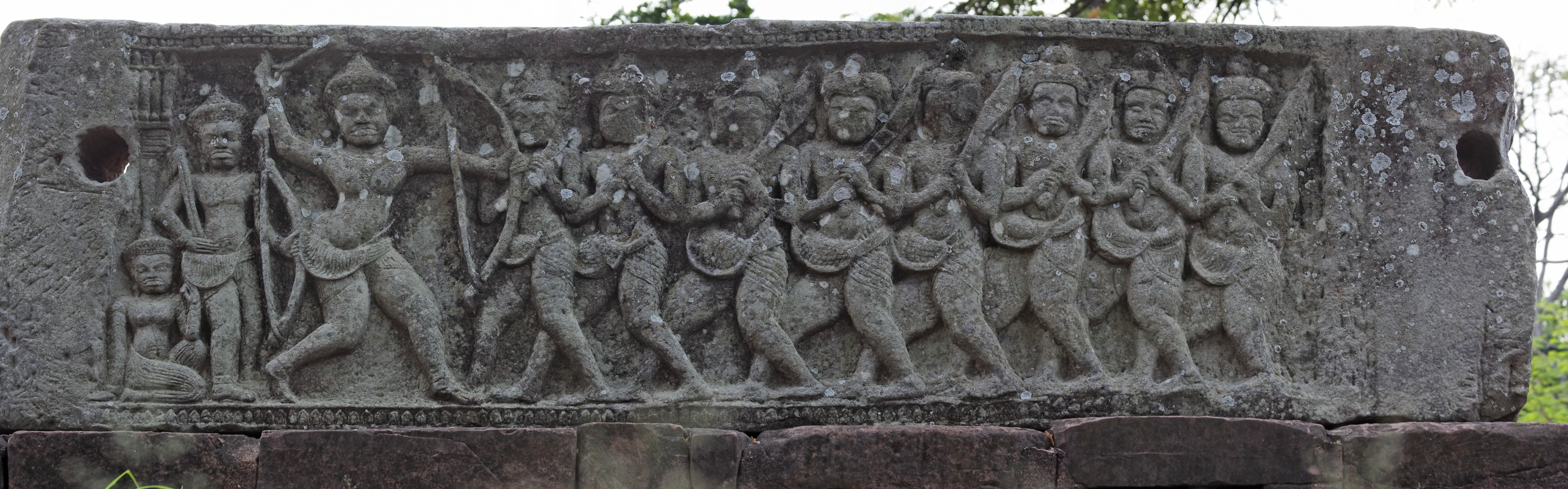

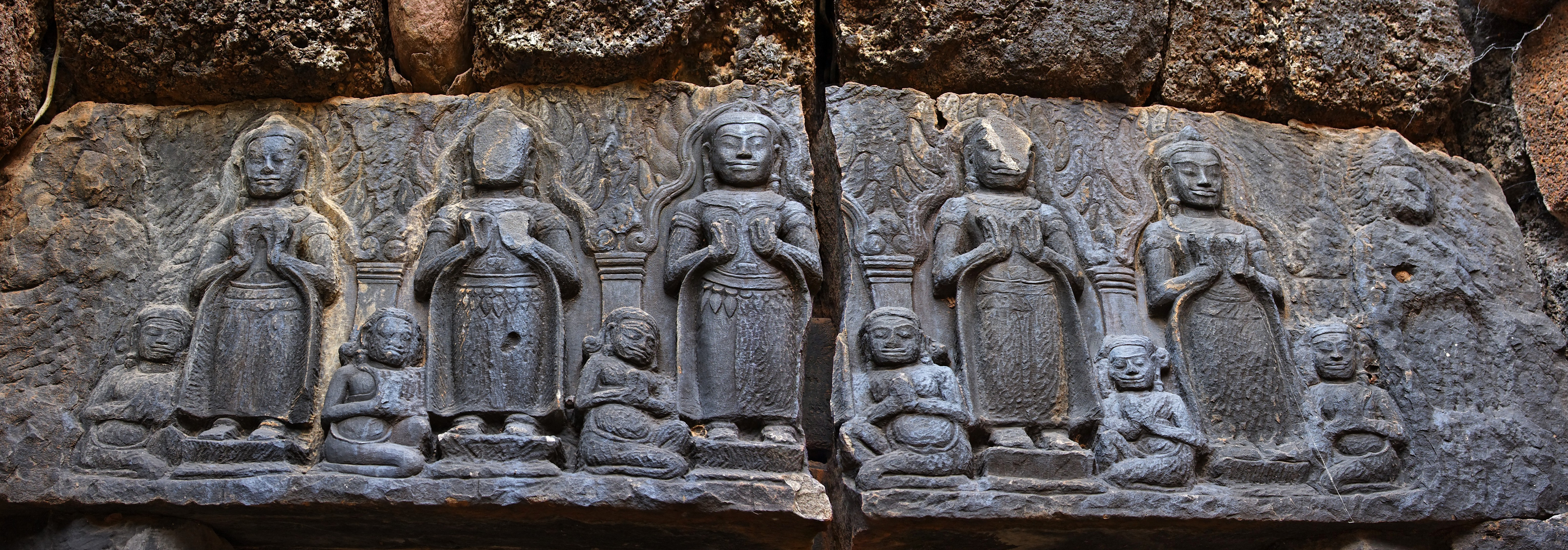

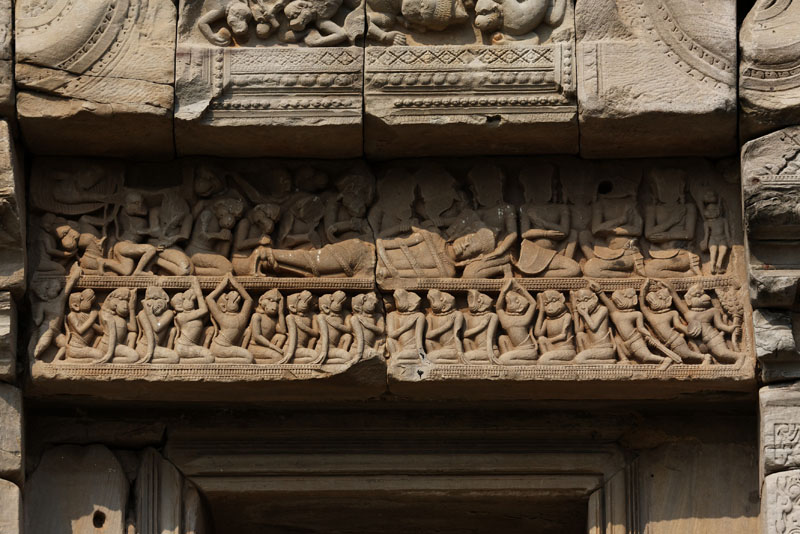

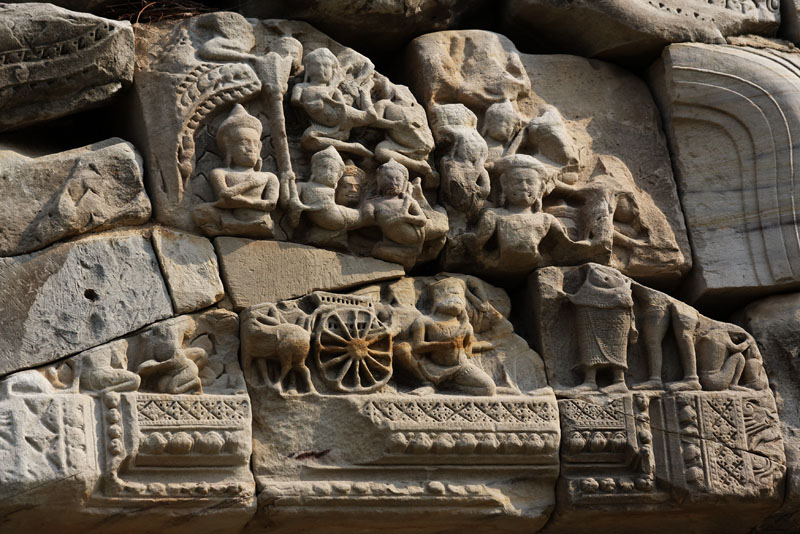

== Phimai National Museum ==
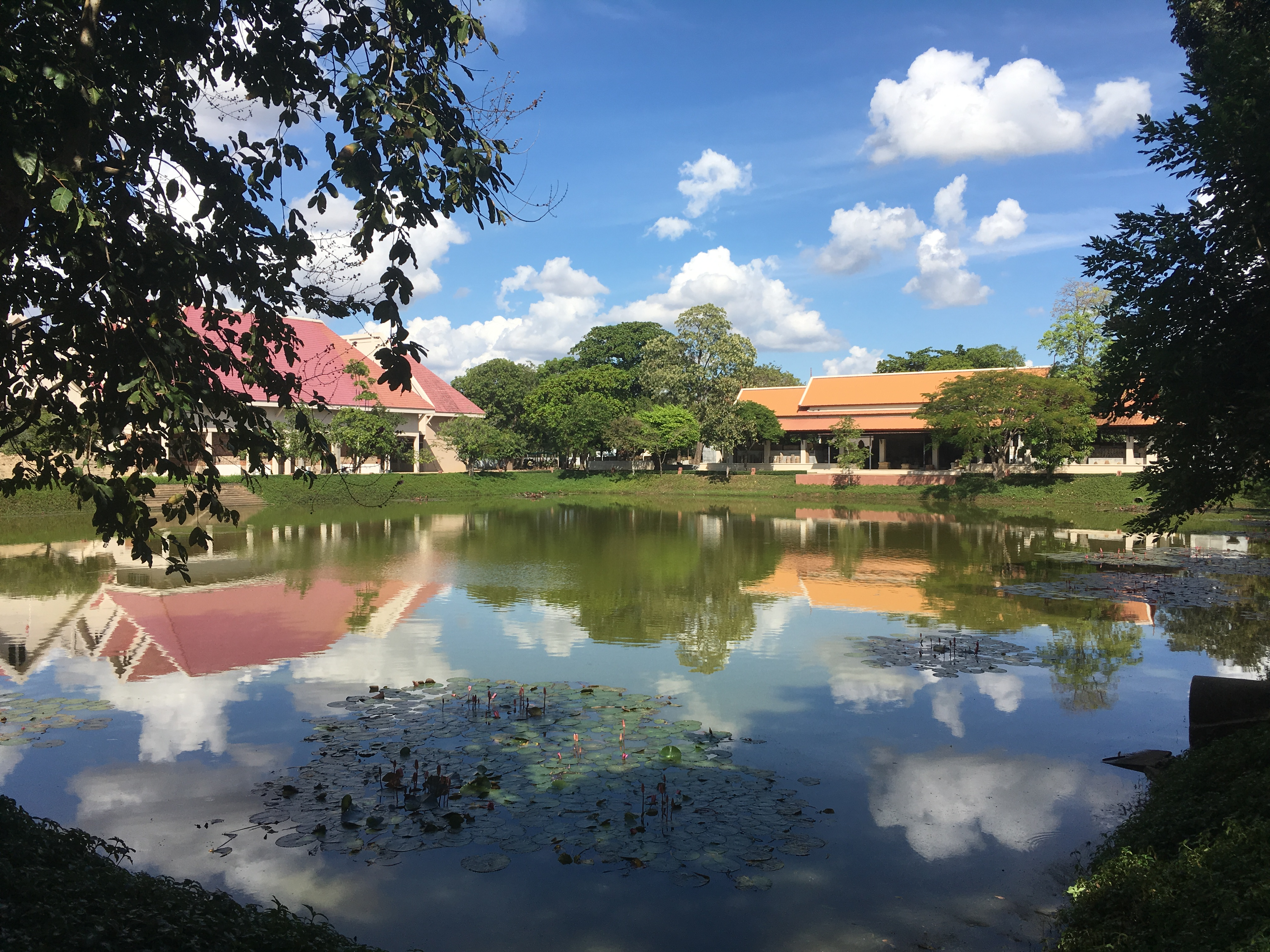
Phimai National Museum

Phimai National Museum is a center for knowledge on the history and archaeology of Lower Northeastern Thailand. Located in Phimai District, Nakhon Ratchasima Province, the museum lies adjacent to (and serves as the primary interpretive museum for) Phimai Historical Park. Its exhibitions present the cultural foundations and development of the Mun–Chi river basin, covering Nakhon Ratchasima, Chaiyaphum, and Buriram provinces, from the prehistoric period around 3,000 years ago to the present day. The museum highlights the region's social development and the belief systems that shaped its cultural origins, and it also displays Khmer antiquities from Lower Isan—especially sandstone architectural elements that once formed parts of stone sanctuary complexes in the area. Many objects on display were excavated from, or are directly associated with, the monuments within the historical park and related sites in the Phimai area.

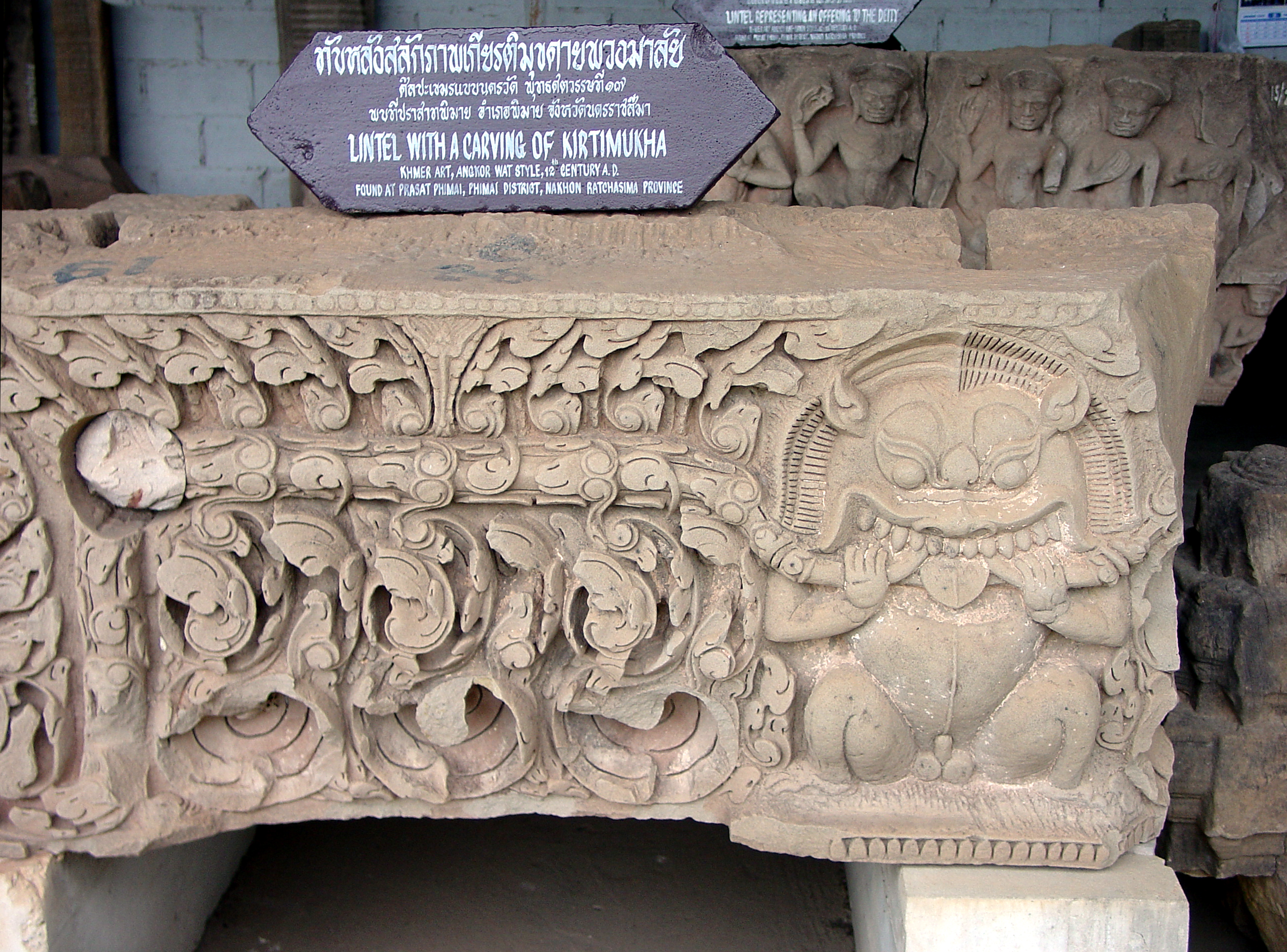

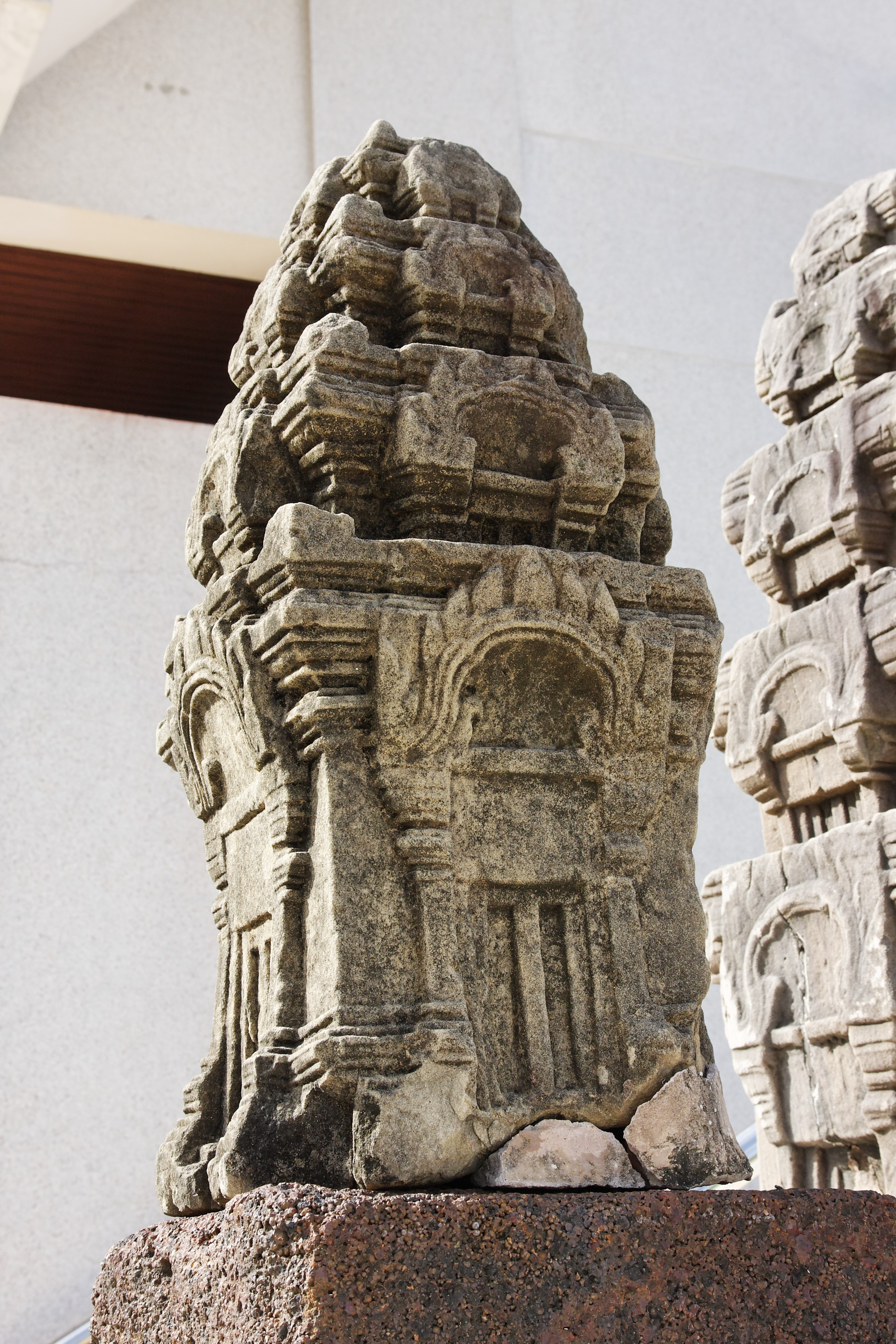

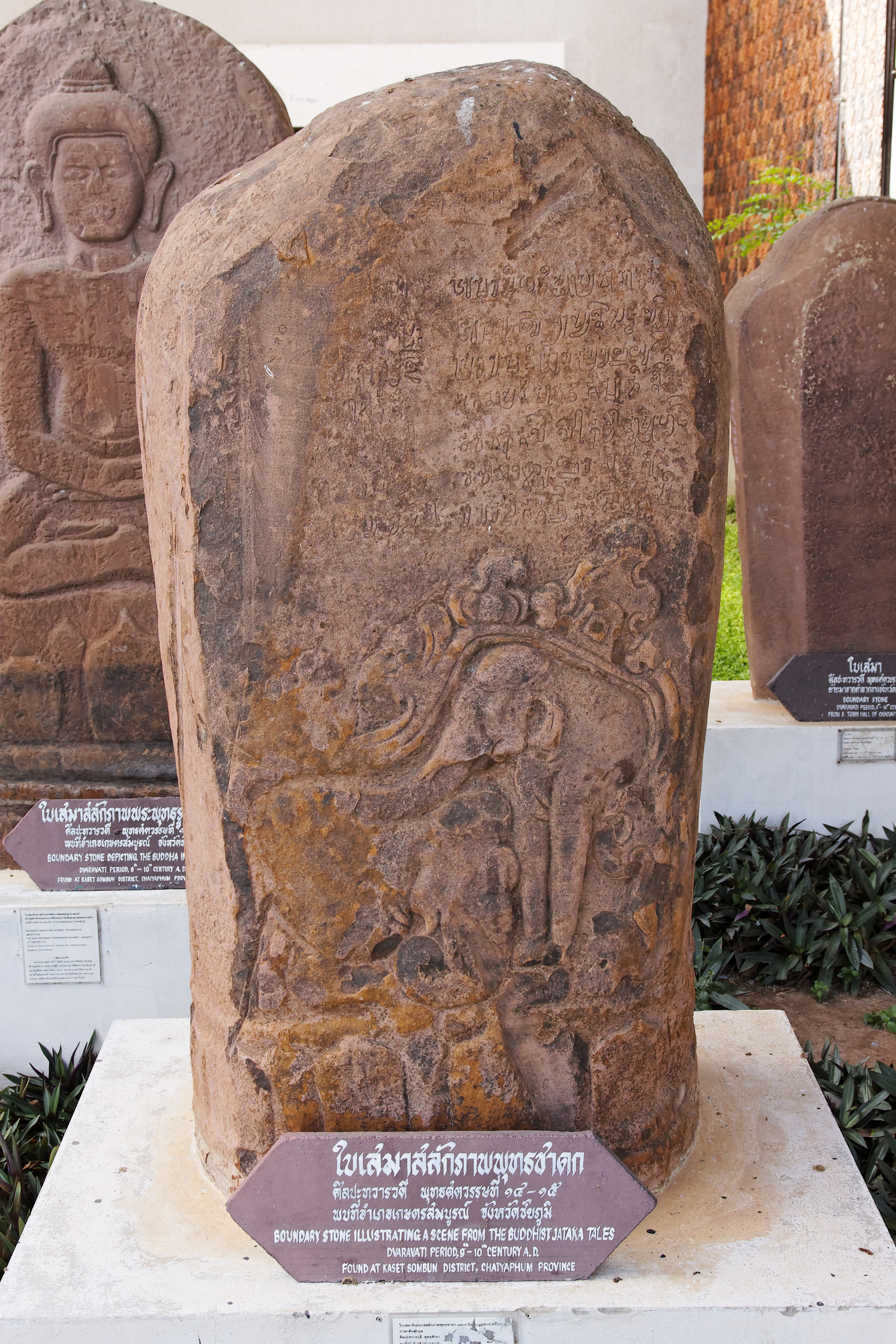

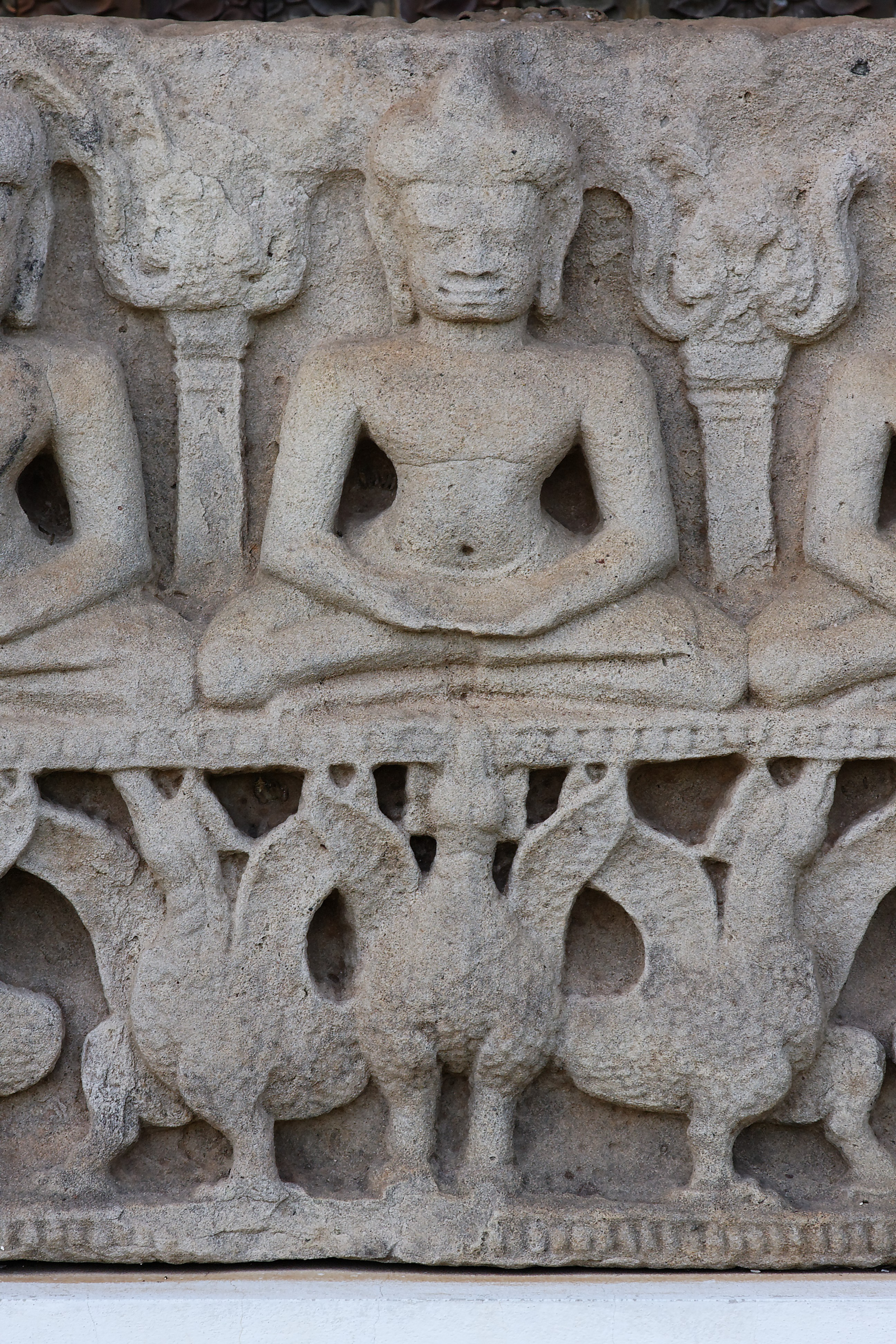

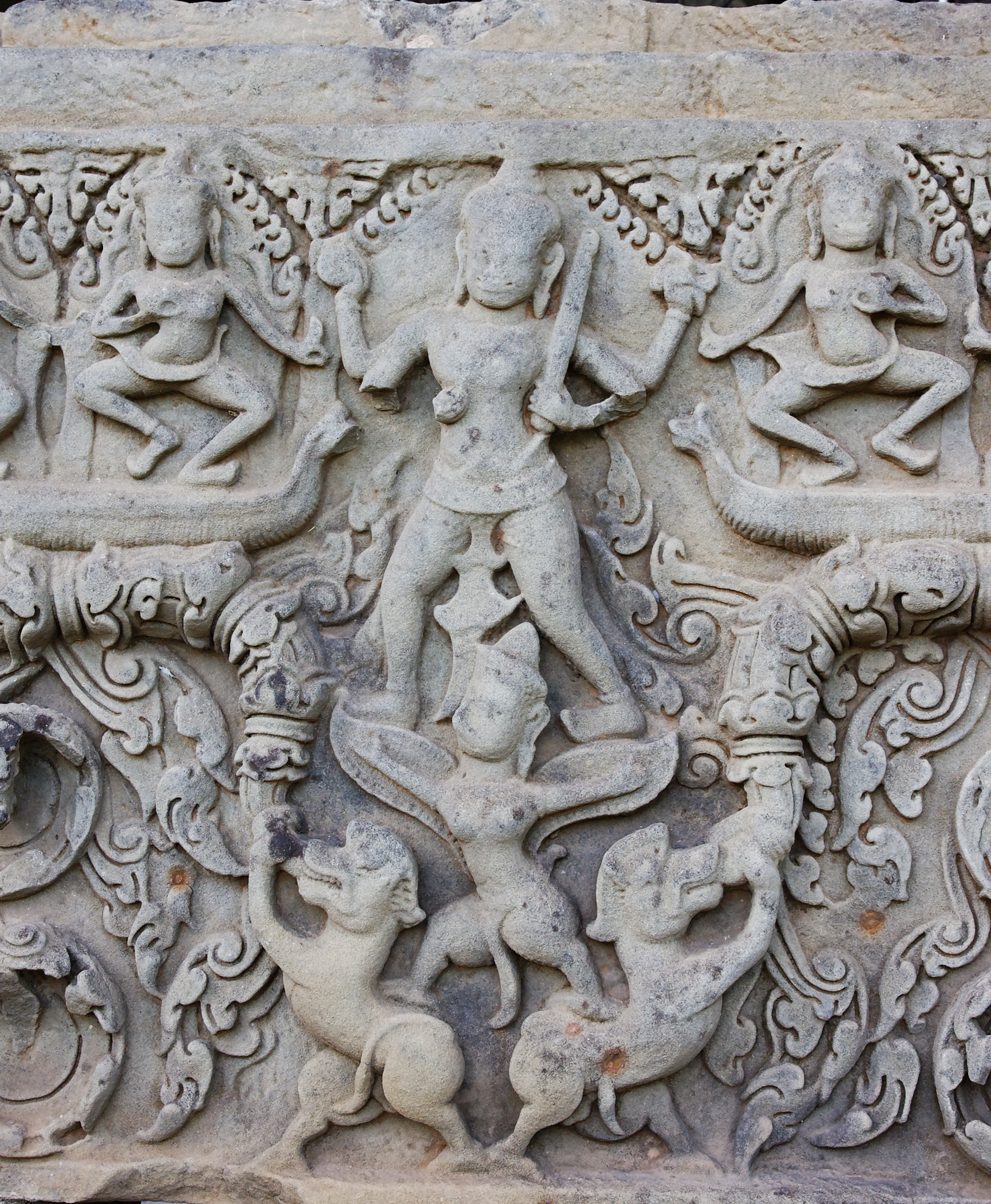

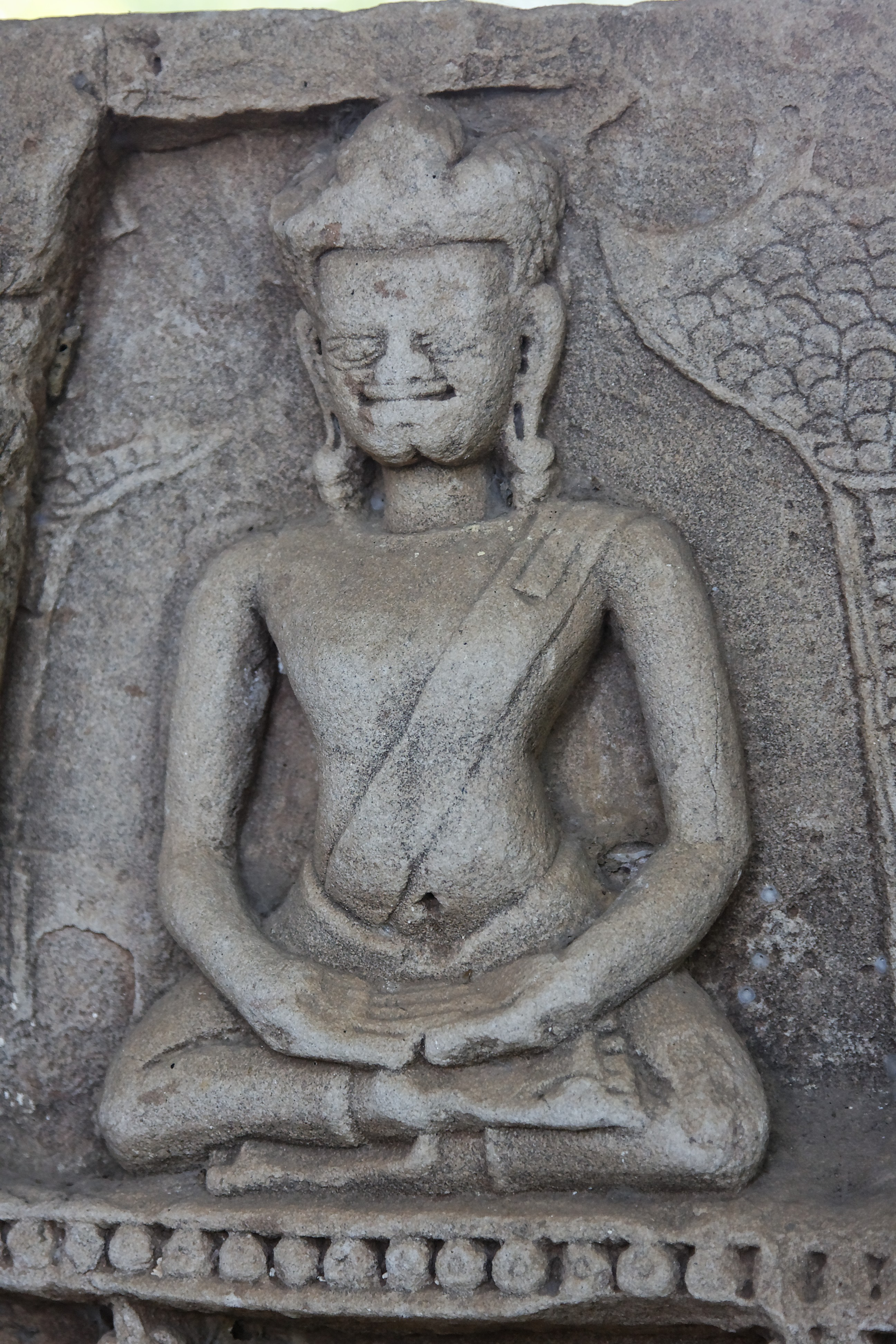

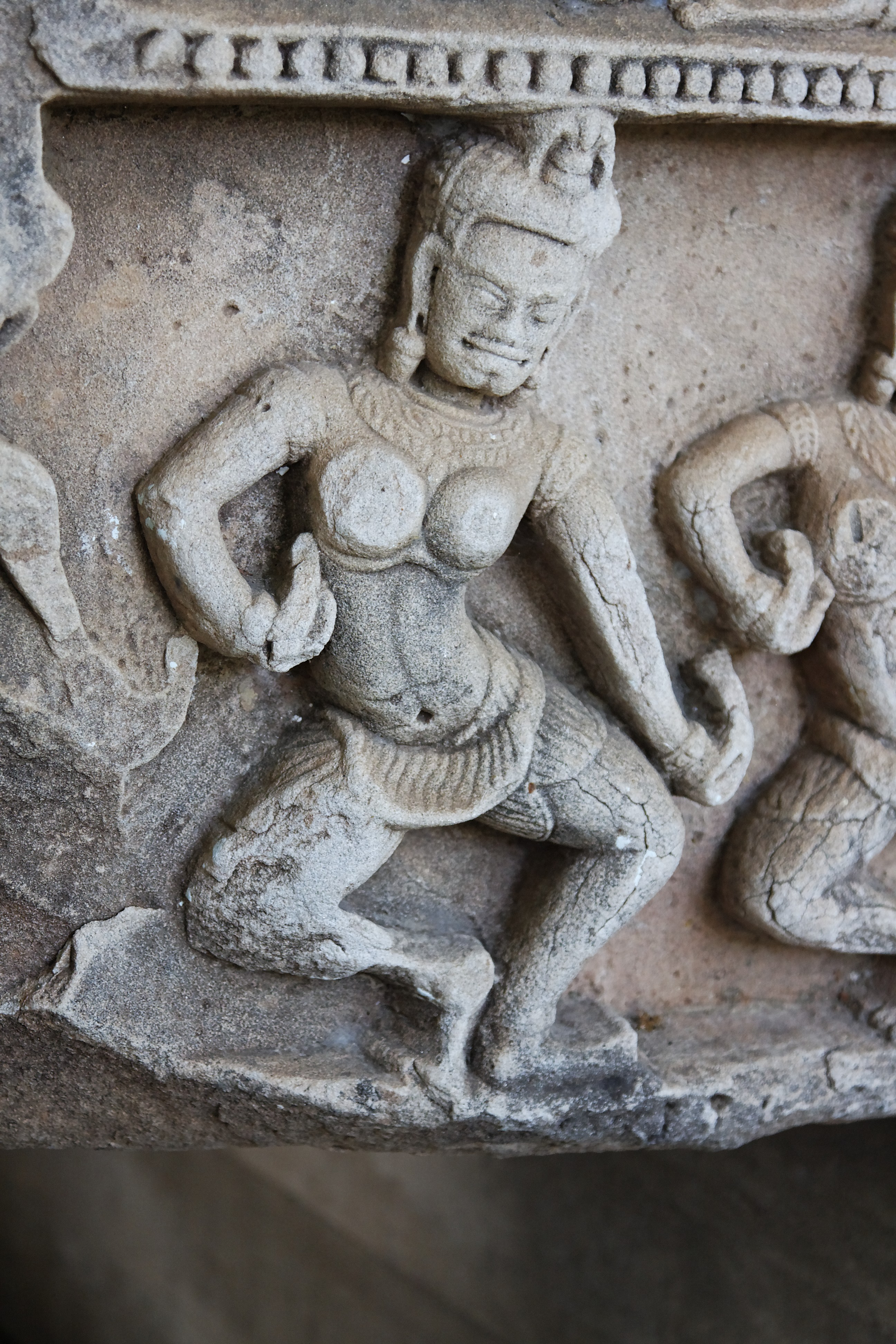

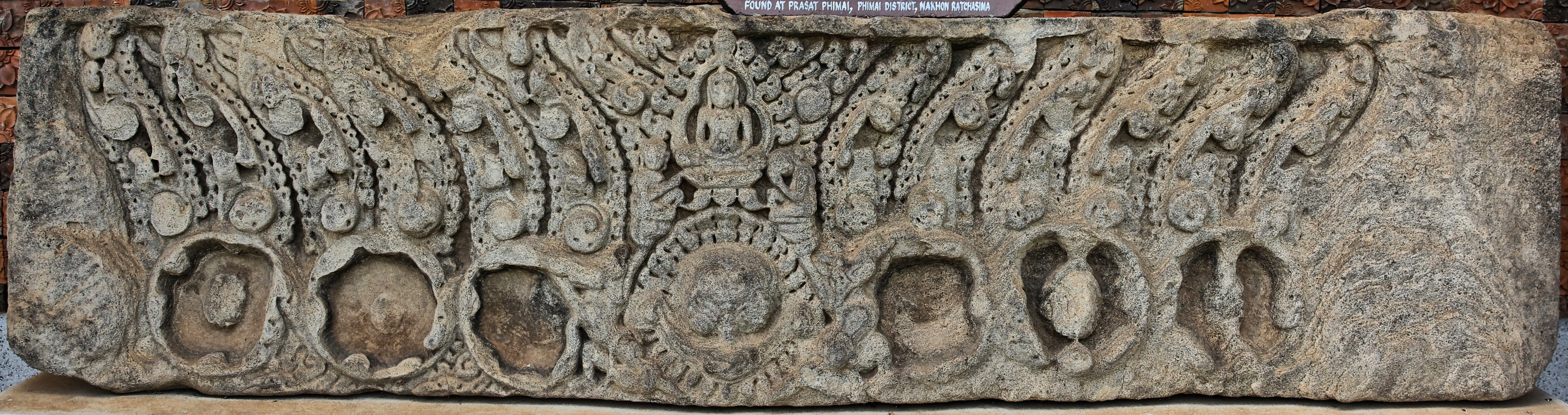

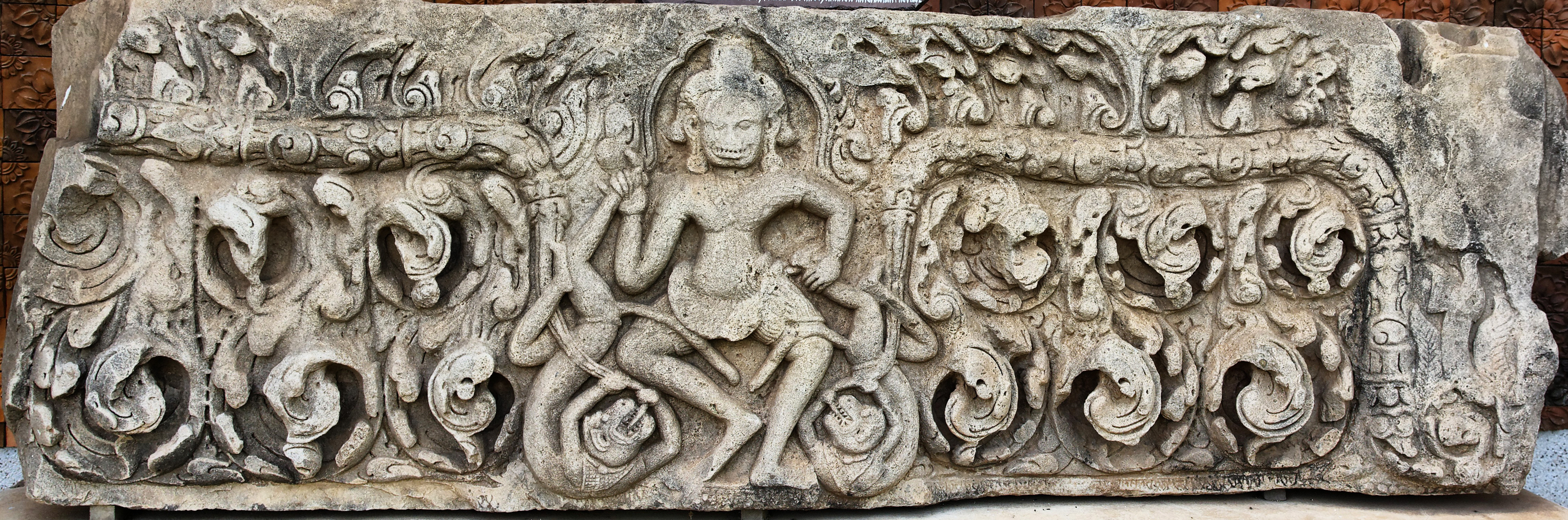

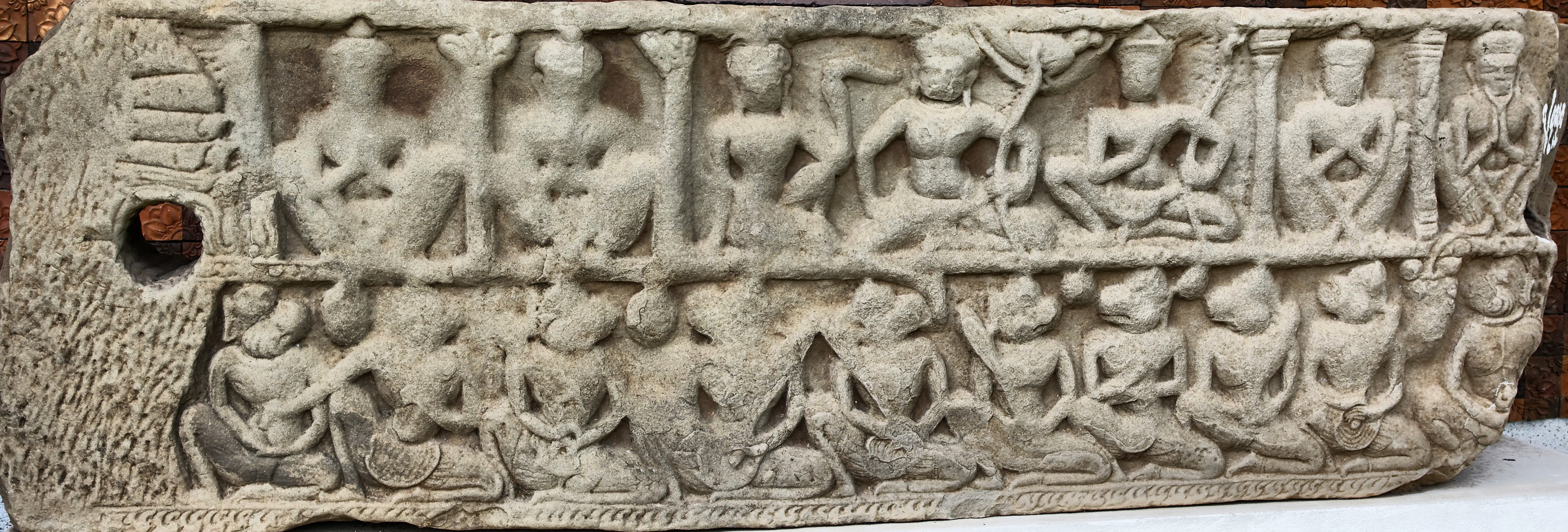

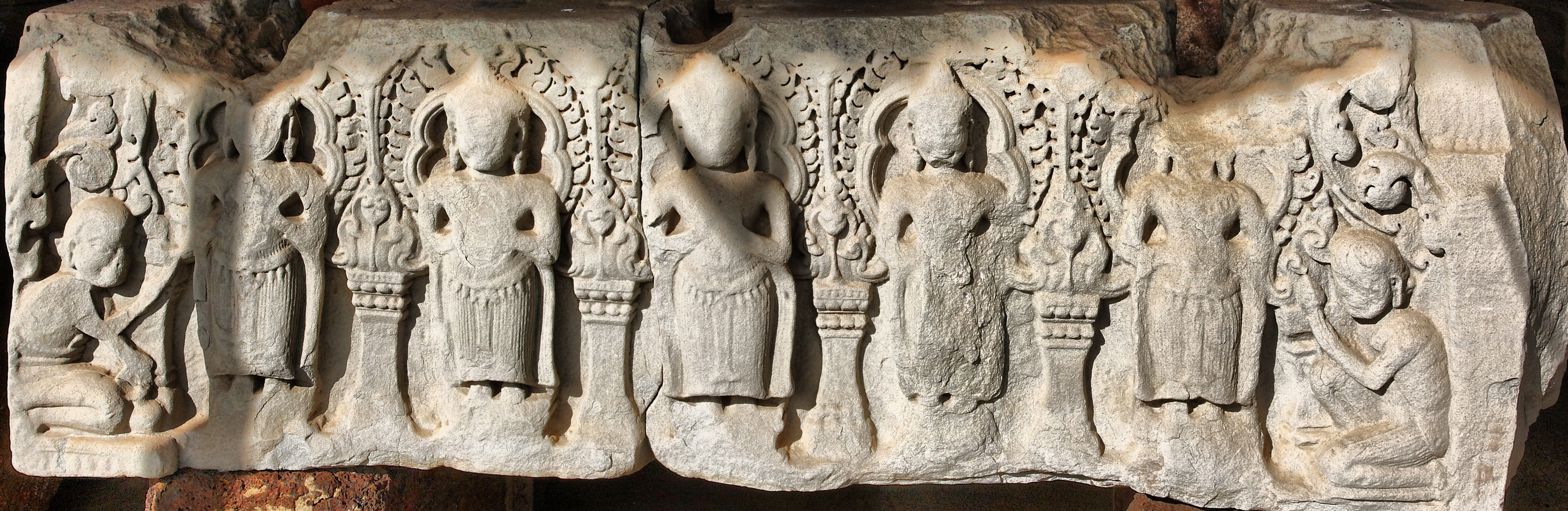

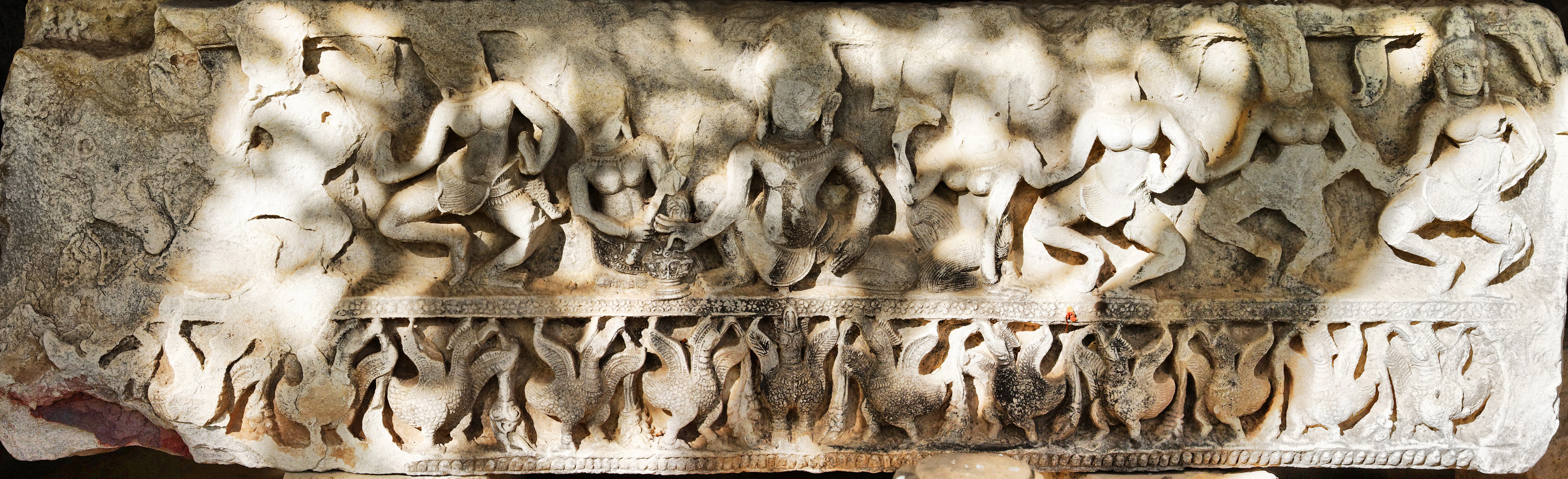

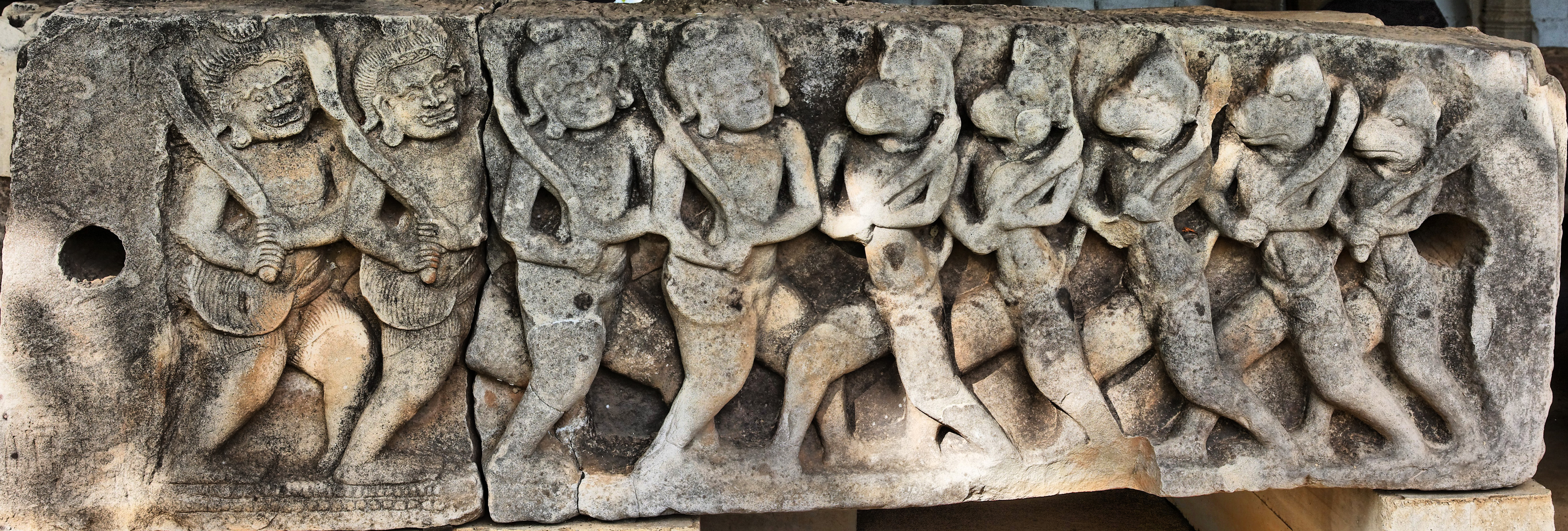

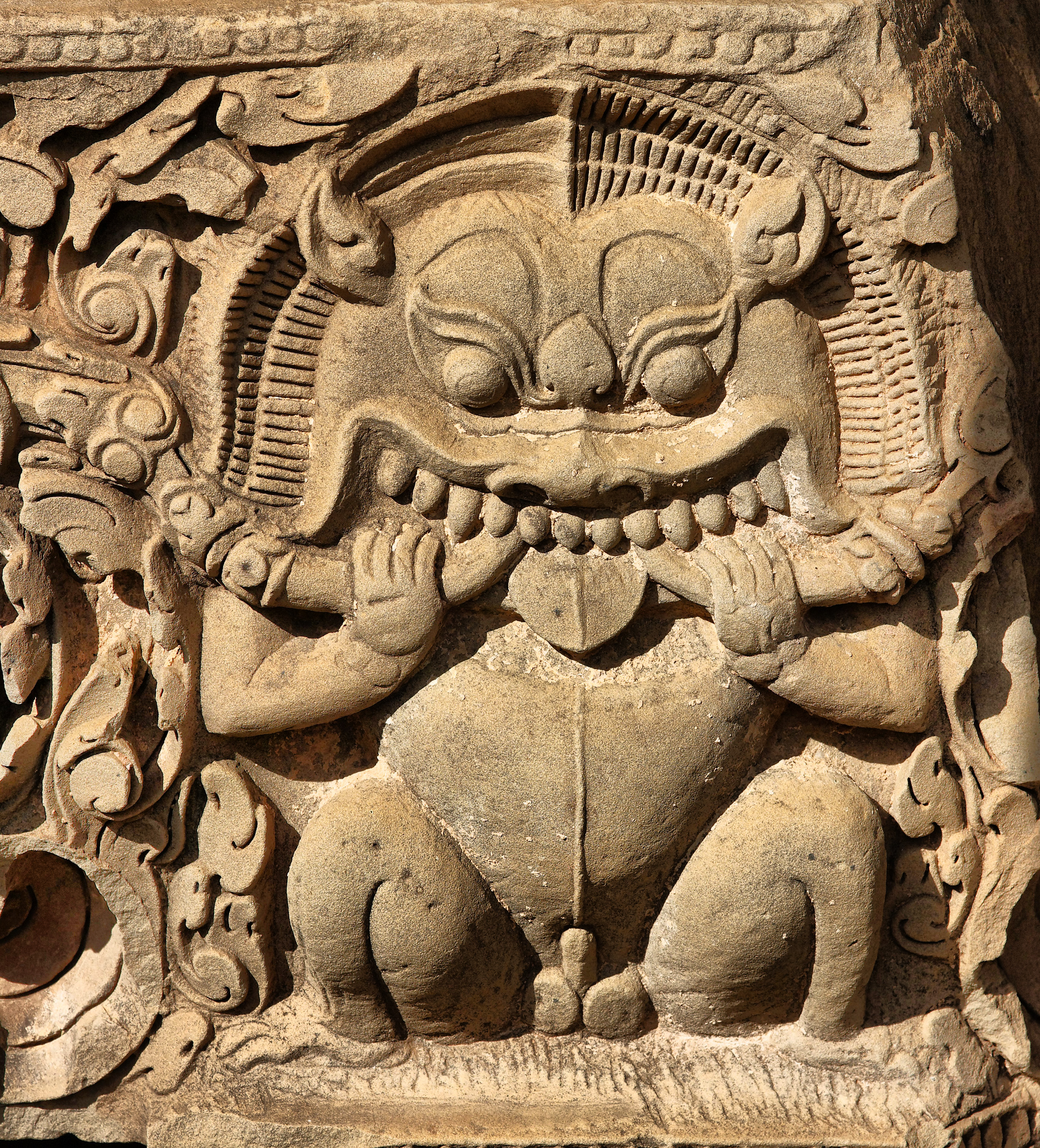

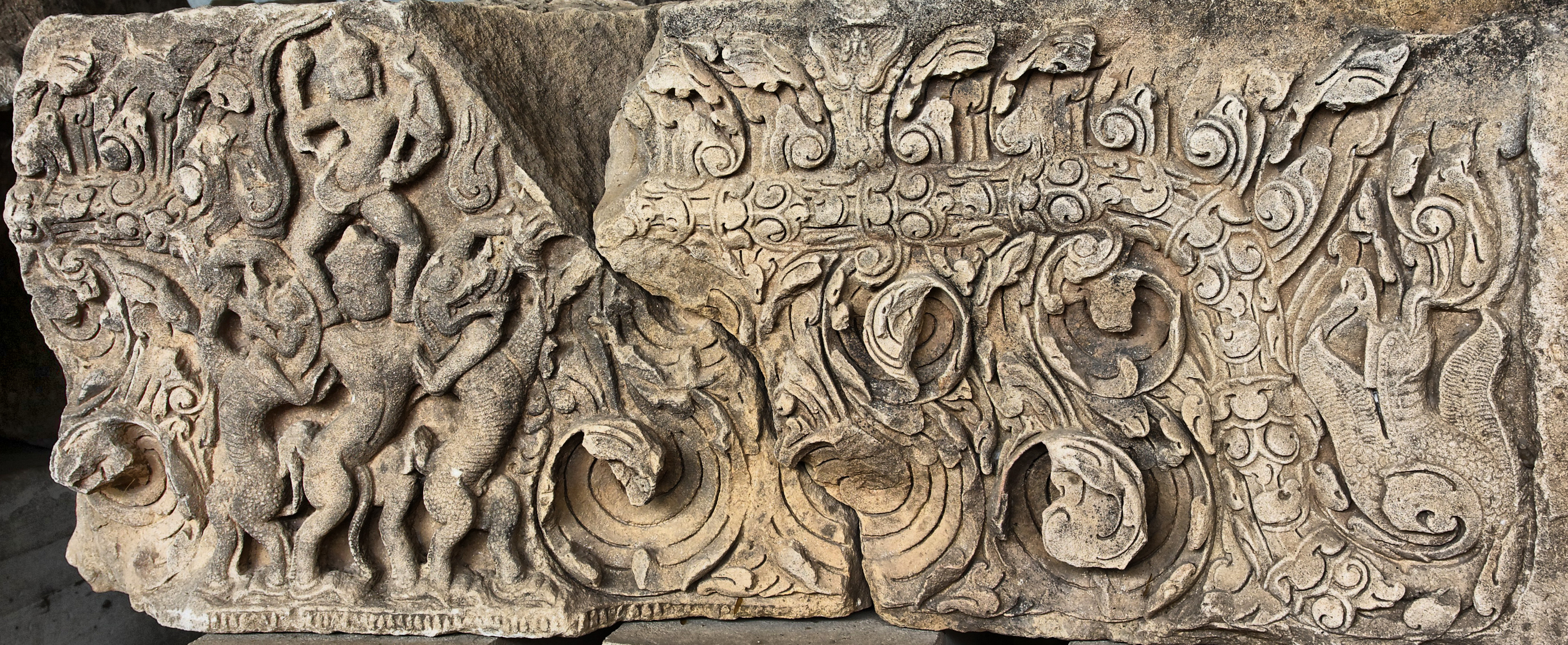

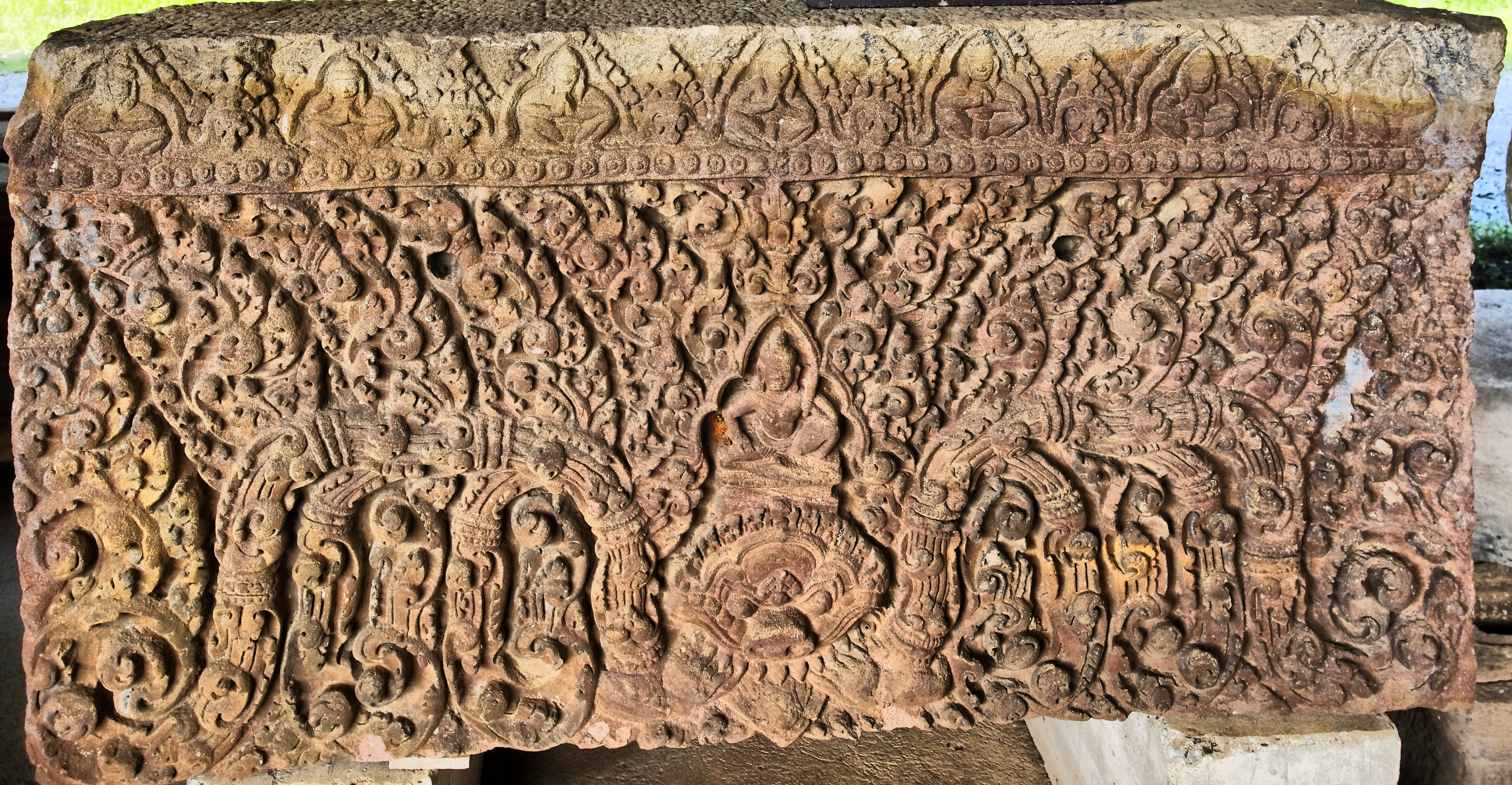

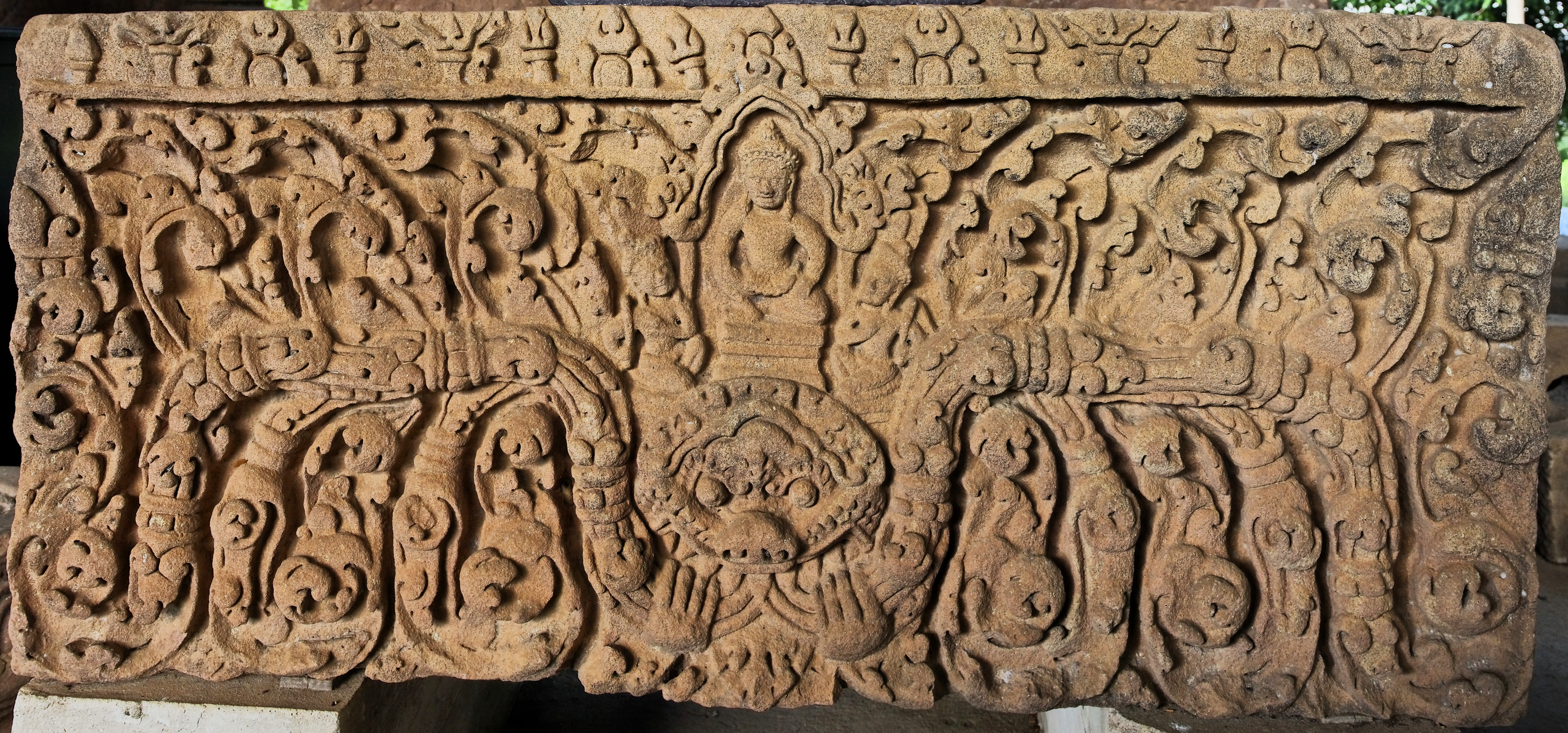

== Archaeological projects ==
In 1998, the Origins of Angkor Project (OAP), a joint project of the Royal Thai Fine Arts Department, Anthropology Department, and the University of Otago, New Zealand, began excavations to investigate the underlying sequence. Temple construction during the Angkorian period involved the deliberate deposition of layers of fill, which can clearly be seen in the stratigraphy of the site.

== Bibliography ==
- Michael Freeman - A guide to Khmer temples in Thailand and Laos, ISBN 0-8348-0450-6
