= Phimai =

Township in Thailand

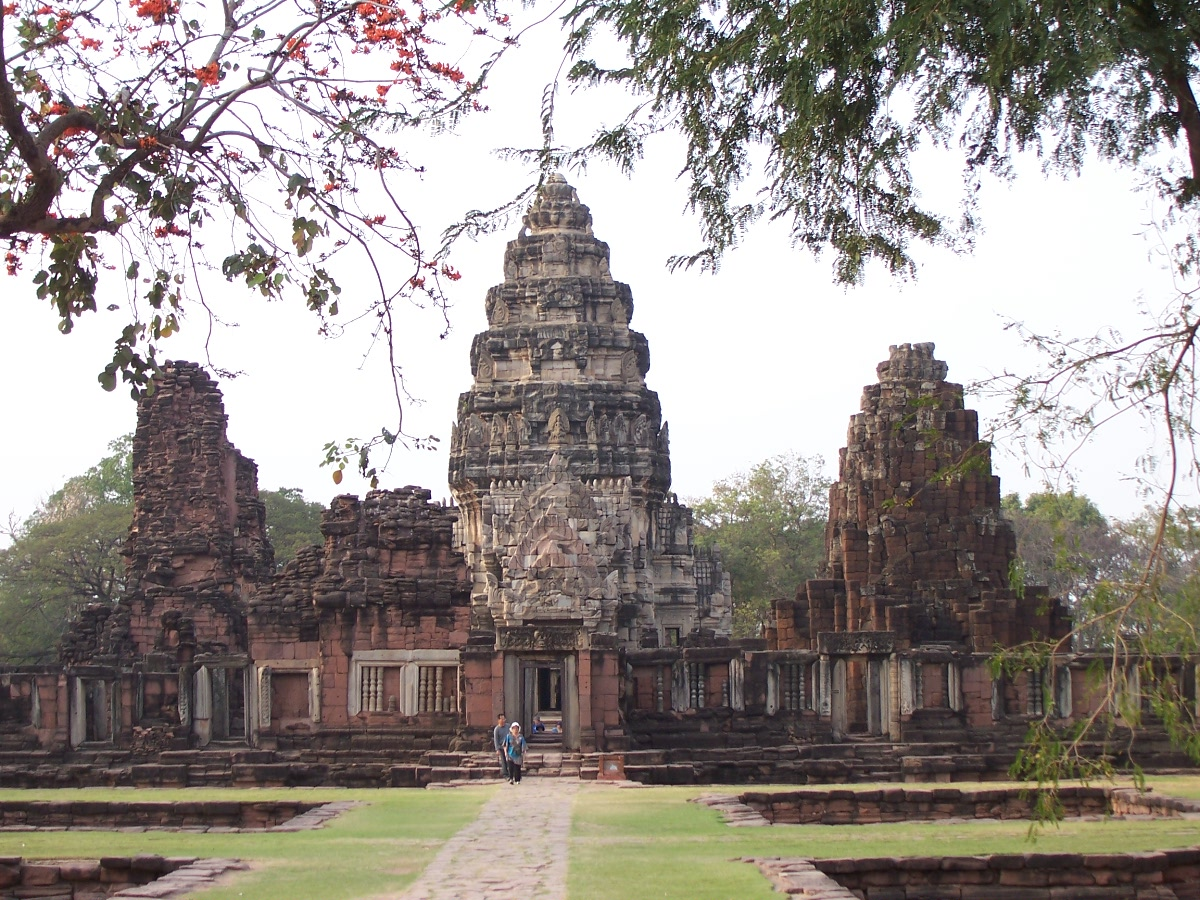
Phimai Historical Park

Phimai (Thai: พิมาย) is a township (thesaban tambon) in Nakhon Ratchasima Province in northeast Thailand. As of 2005 the town had a population of 9,768. The town is the administrative center of the Phimai District.

== History ==
The region was integrated into the Khmer Empire around 1000 CE. For the following 300 years, Phimai was a major regional administrative center. The temple Prasat Hin Phimai, in the center of the town, was one of the major Khmer temples in what is now Thailand, connected with Angkor by the Khmer highway, and oriented so as to face Angkor as its cardinal direction. The site is now protected as the Phimai Historical Park.

In the aftermath of the fall of the Ayutthaya Kingdom in 1767, attempts were made to set up five separate states, with Prince Teppipit, a son of king Boromakot, attempting to establish Phimai as one, holding sway over eastern provinces including Nakhon Ratchasima. The weakest of the five, Prince Teppipit was the first defeated and was executed in 1768.

Phimai has recently been the base of operations for the excavation of Ban Non Wat.

== Korat cat ==
Phimai is thought to be the place where the famed Korat cat breed originated.
