= Ancient Khmer Highway =

Historic roadway in Cambodia and Thailand

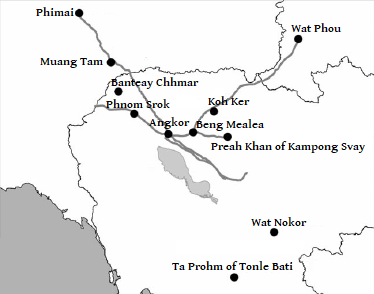
Map of the Ancient Khmer Road System of the Khmer Empire

The Ancient Khmer Highway was a 225 km (140 mi) roadway going northwest between Angkor (in Cambodia) and Phimai (Vimayapura) (now in Thailand). While it was not the only such road built by the Khmer, it was the most important one.

Most of the road is overgrown by the jungle and is only visible today on aerial photographs. Few of dharmasala or houses with fire, the rest house chapels or hospital chapels survive (only the chapels remain as they were the only buildings built of sandstone or laterite, and all wooden constructions rotted away long ago). The only part of the road which is still driveable is at the entrance to the town of Phimai (state route 2163).

The road has been proven to exist in the 12th and 13th century, but it is quite certain that it existed earlier. Most of the buildings along the road date from the reign of King Jayavarman VII.

The road used the Ta Muen Thom pass over the Dângrêk Mountains, and the first major stop was the Phanom Rung temple.
