= Dharmasala =

Houses of rest for travelers and pilgrims

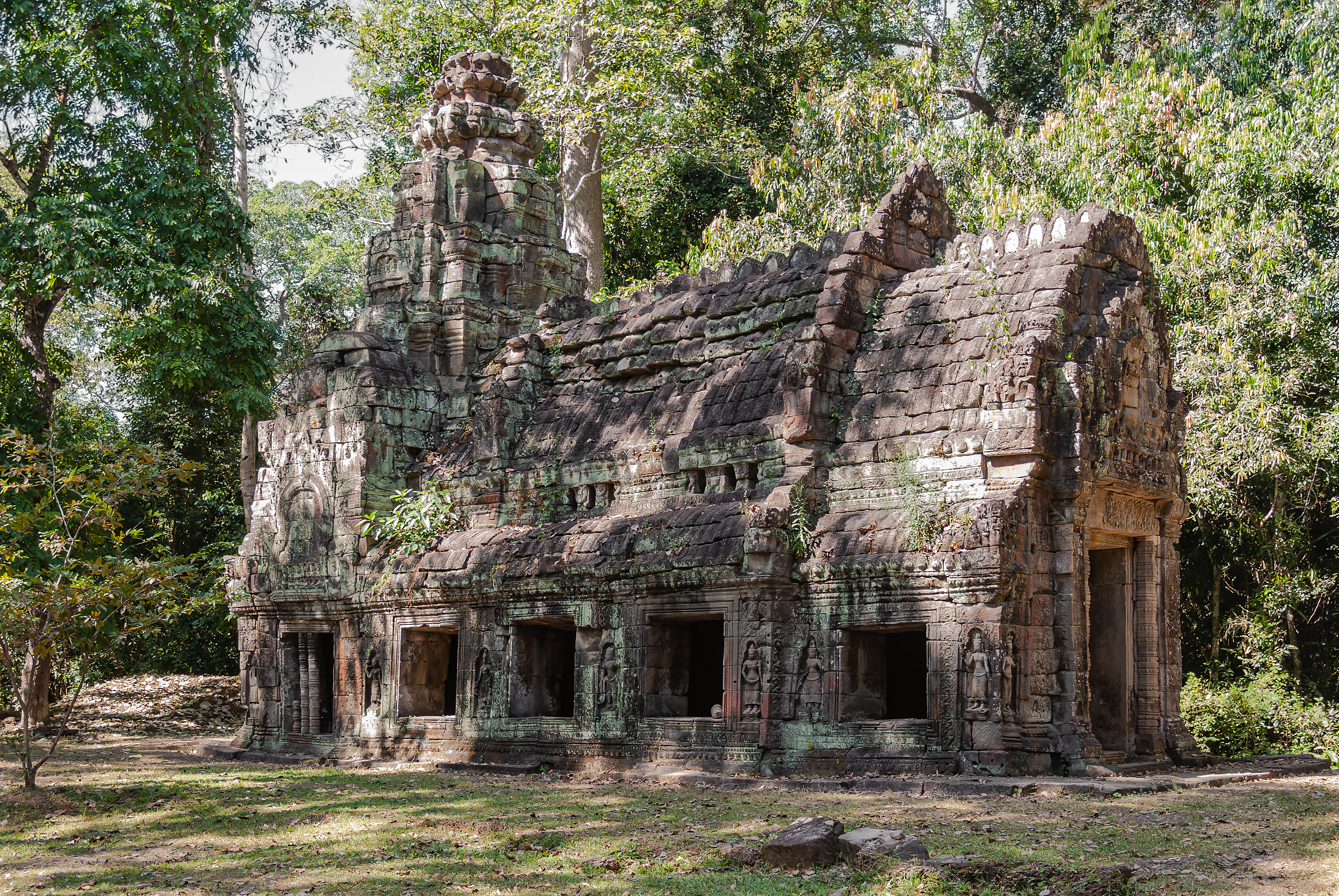
The "House of Fire" at the temple of Preah Khan.

A dharmasala is a type of building characteristic of ancient Cambodia intended to provide rest and shelter to pilgrims. It is a type of building found in Angkorian complexes constructed during the reign of late 12th-century monarch Jayavarman VII and still found in Preah Khan, Ta Prohm and Banteay Chhmar.

== Etymology ==
The modern name dharmasala derives from the term dharma "virtue" and sala "house." It has been claimed that "their Sanskrit name can only translate as 'the house of fire'."

== Architecture ==
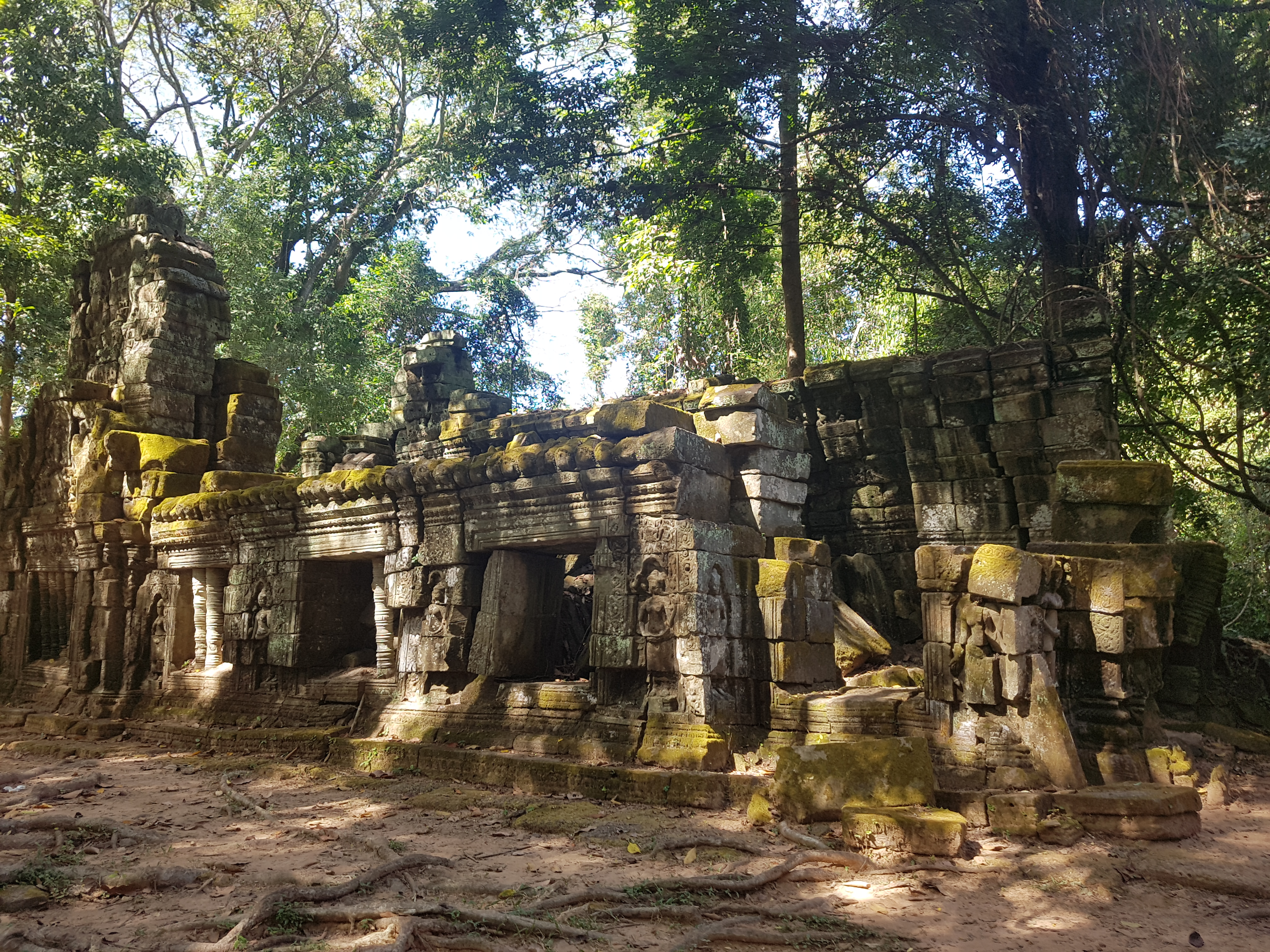
View of the House of Fire at the Ta Prohm temple in Siem Reap, Cambodia.

The 121 dharmasalas built by Jayavarman VII all follow a similar plan: aligned east–west, a tower at the west end, and south-facing windows. They tend to have thick walls of brick or stone, and double-balustered windows.

Building orientation follows the position of the road rather than the typical east–west cardinal alignment of Angkorian architecture.

The average size of a dharmaçala was recorded as 14–15 m in length and 4–5 m in width.

In modern times, the dharmashala have evolved towards wooden structures simply referred to as sala samnak.

== History ==
=== Origin: the Indian philanthropic tradition of hospitality ===
Dharmashalas have been a part of the Indian philanthropic tradition since olden days and orthodox traveller still prefers to stay in a dharmashala rather than in a hotel.

=== Development: "houses of fire" on the road network of Jayavarman VII ===
The Preah Khan stele dated to 1191 CE (see Cœdès 1941) and the decorative use of the Lokesvara motif. The stele describes a series of 121 vahni-griha found along three roads and in specific Angkorian temple enclosures. The decorative use of the Lokesvara motif, which represents the Buddha of compassion, is associated with the switch to Buddhism as state religion for Jayavarman VII and his successor Indravarman II (1220-1270 CE).

In the late 13th century, one hundred years after the reign of Jayavarman VII, Zhou Dagan mentioned the presence of samnak, or rest stops, which he compared to the post houses more common in China.

Though the massive houses of fire fell into disrepair with the collapse of the Khmer Empire, the use of specific sala for travelers remained: in the 19th century, Henri Mouhot commented on the frequency of royal stations spaced approximately 20 kilometers apart for the king on the route between Kampot and Udong.

=== Archeology: rediscovering the religious purpose of the houses of fire ===
In 1903, French archeologist A. Foucher recognised that these structures served first and foremost religious purposes and were not simply ‘resthouses’, pointing out that stone is a material intended for the gods and not for human habitation.

The first and only publication specifically addressing the ruins on the model of Prasat Teap Chei was conducted by Finot (1925) who provided descriptions of the size, decoration, orientation, and spacing of the dharmaçalas, a term that suggests both a religious and secular role.

Claude Jacques recently supported the use of theses structures as fire shrine as it more accurately represents the inscription and possibly points to its role in housing a ‘sacred fire’, images of which are depicted being carried in processions on the walls of Angkor Wat, Banteay Chhmar and the Bayon.

To this day, many Angkorian sites have been identified as houses of fire, in places such as Prohm Kel, Prasat Phtu, Teap Chei, Preah Khan, Ta Prohm, Kuk Top Thom and Prasat Kuk.

== Function ==
Debate exists as to the exact use of the houses of fire. Scholars theorise that the houses with fire functioned as a "rest house with fire" for travellers or even chapels for travellers believed to be the house of fire, housing the sacred fire. An inscription at Preah Khan tells of 121 such rest houses lining the highways into Angkor. The Chinese traveller Zhou Daguan expressed his admiration for these rest houses when he visited Angkor in 1296 CE. Another theory is that the House of Fire had a religious function as the repository the sacred flame used in sacred ceremonies.

== Topography ==
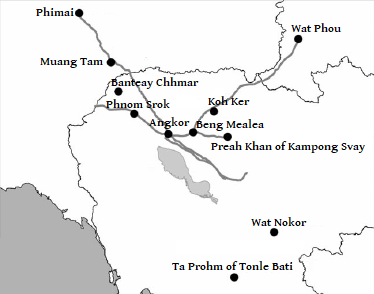
Map of the road system of the Khmer Empire, along which are found the houses with fire.

In 1902, Lunet de Lajonquière rediscovered the regularly-spaced temples along the northwest and east roads. The dharmasalas are normally found to the north of the routes.

Of all the characteristics, it is the regular spacing between temples that provides the justification for applying the specific term ‘resthouse’ that was initially presented by Louis Finot. Groslier suggested that an average day's travel in ancient Cambodia was 25 kilometers, thus determining the spacing between these structures.

Initial measurements between the 11 known fire shrines on the Northwest and East roads were first recorded by Finot (1925) resulting in distances between 1.6 and 108 km. Discovery of the remaining fire shrines along the Northwest road in 2008 results in an average distance of 16.11 kilometers, which would suggest night stops as well has half-day breaks.

== See also ==
- Khmer architecture
- Hindu temple architecture

== Sources ==
- Hendrickson, Mitch (2008). "People around the Houses with Fire" (PDF). Journal of Khmer Studies. 9: 63–79 – via Angkor Database.
