= Non Charoen =

Non Charoen โนนเจริญ
- Subdistrict municipality
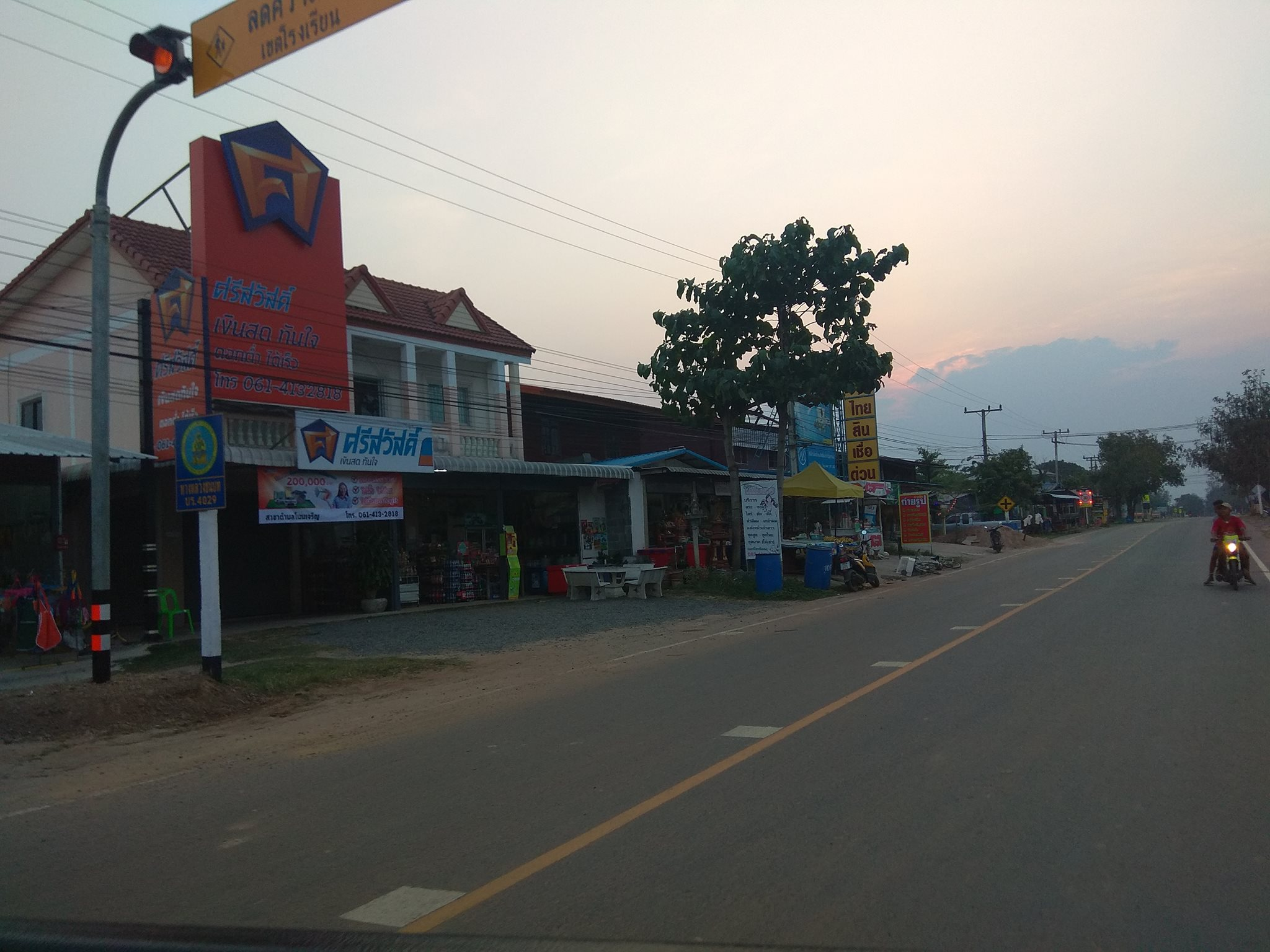
- Road in Non Charoen

- Location in Thailand
- Coordinates: 14°29′6.5″N 103°11′5.3″E
- Country: Thailand
- Province: Buriram
- District: Ban Kruat
- Tambon: Non Charoen

Government
  - Type: Local government
  - Mayor: Somjai Khamapanya

Area
  - Total: 21.679 km^{2} (8.370 sq mi)
- Elevation: 181.9 m (597 ft)

Population (2020)
  - Total: 8,563
  - Density: 392/km^{2} (1,020/sq mi)
- Time zone: UTC+7 (Thailand Standard Time)
- Postal code: 31180
- Area code: 044
- Website: www.noncharoen.go.th

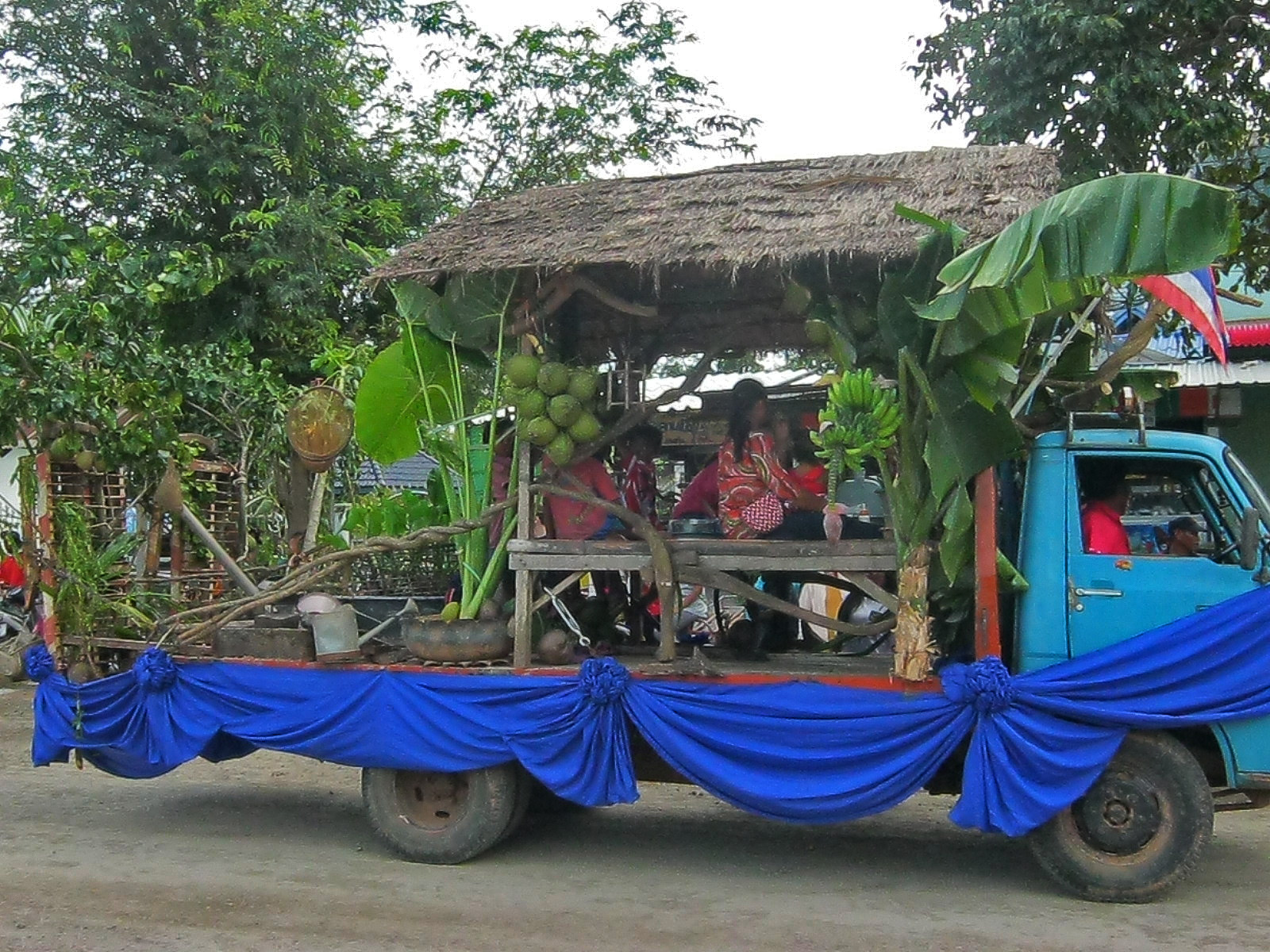
Loykratong Festival in Non Charoen

Non Charoen (Thai: โนนเจริญ) is a subdistrict municipality (thesaban tambon) in Buriram Province, Thailand. The town covers the whole subdistrict (tambon) Non Charoen of Ban Kruat district.

== History ==
The local government unit was established effective February 21 1997 as a subdistrict administrative organization (SAO). On October 27 2009 it was upgraded to a subdistrict municipality.

== Territory ==
- Northern bordering Tambon Khao Din Nuea
- Eastern bordering Khao Din Nuea, Khok Klang Amphoe Phanom Dong Rak Surin Province
- Southern bordering Tambon Chan Thop Phet, Sai Ta Ku
- Western bordering Tambon Hin Lat

== Administration divisions ==
There are 11 muban (villages) (Thai: หมู่บ้าน) in Non Charoen.

Rank	English name	Thai Name
1	Non Charoen	บ้านโนนเจริญ
2	Non Charoen	บ้านโนนเจริญ
3	Non Charoen	บ้านโนนเจริญ
4	Non Charoen	บ้านโนนเจริญ
5	Non Charoen	บ้านโนนเจริญ
6	Nong Wang	บ้านหนองแวง
7	Hua Thanon	บ้านหัวถนน
8	Sai Tho 9 Soi 3	บ้านสายโท 9 ซอย 3
9	Kok Yai	บ้านโคกใหญ่
10	Sam Ka Pattana	บ้านสามขาพัฒนา
11	Santisuk	บ้านสันติสุข
