= Phlapphla Chai district =

Phlapphla Chai พลับพลาชัย
- District
- District location in Buriram province
- Coordinates: 14°43′48″N 103°10′6″E
- Country: Thailand
- Province: Buriram
- Seat: Sadao

Area
  - Total: 320.1 km^{2} (123.6 sq mi)

Population (2005)
  - Total: 42,773
  - Density: 122.3/km^{2} (317/sq mi)
- Time zone: UTC+7 (ICT)
- Postal code: 31250
- Geocode: 3115

Phlapphla Chai (Thai: พลับพลาชัย, pronounced [pʰláp.pʰlāː t͡ɕʰāj]) is a district (amphoe) of Buriram province, northeastern Thailand.

== Geography ==
Neighbouring districts are (from the south clockwise) Prakhon Chai, Mueang Buriram, Krasang of Buriram Province and Prasat of Surin province.

== History ==
The minor district (king amphoe) was created on 1 April 1989, when five tambons were split off from Prakhon Chai district. It was upgraded to a full district on 4 July 1994.

== Administration ==
The district is divided into five sub-districts (tambons), which are further subdivided into 67 villages (mubans). Phlapphla Chai is a township (thesaban tambon) which covers parts of tambon Sadao. There are also five tambon administrative organizations (TAO).

| No. | Name | Thai name | Villages | Pop. |
|---|---|---|---|---|
| 1. | Chan Dum | จันดุม | 18 | 10,421 |
| 2. | Khok Khamin | โคกขมิ้น | 15 | 9,266 |
| 3. | Pa Chan | ป่าชัน | 10 | 5,852 |
| 4. | Sadao | สะเดา | 13 | 9,158 |
| 5. | Samrong | สำโรง | 11 | 8,076 |
