= Prasat Muang Tam =

Muang Tam
- Prasat Hin Muang Tam
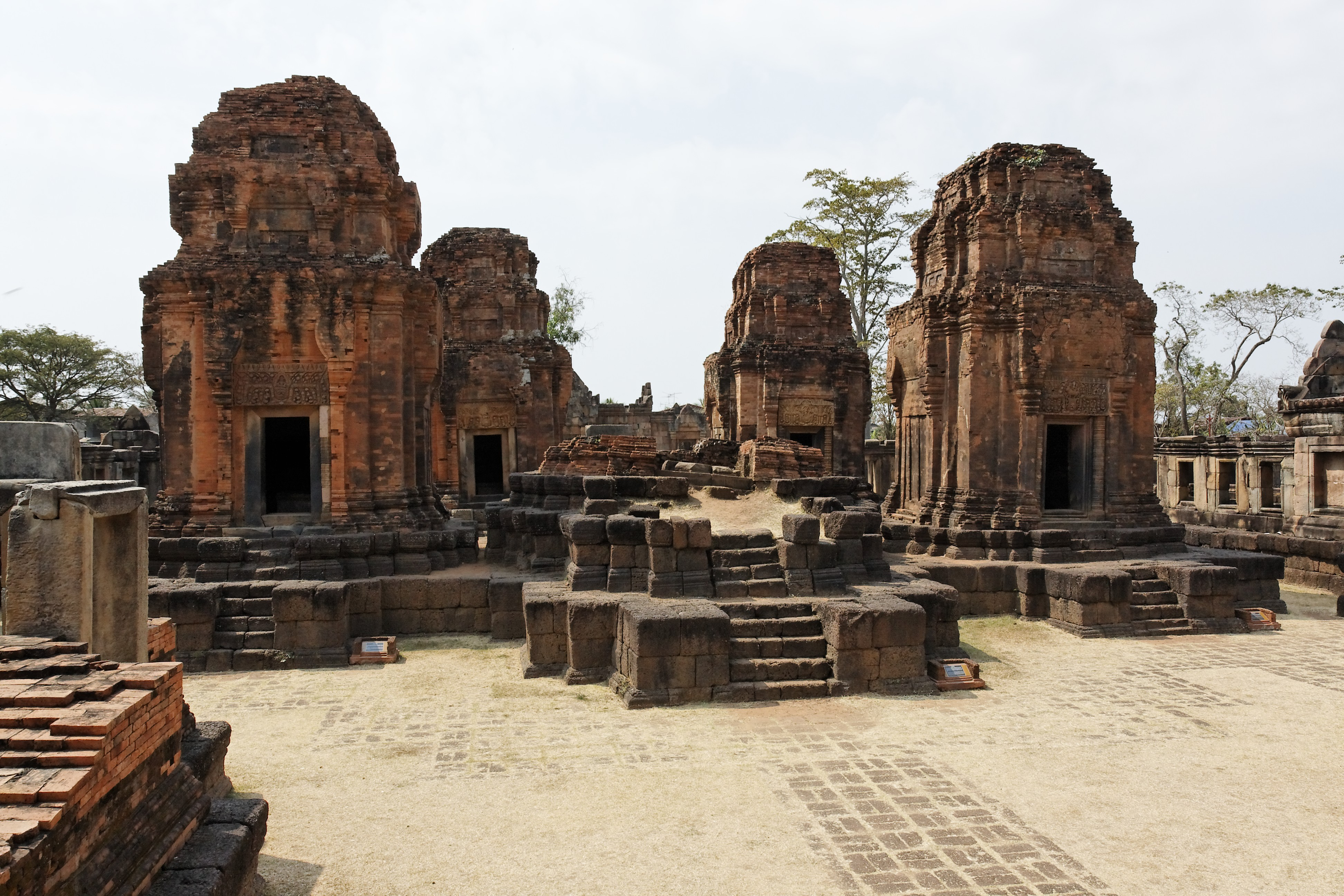

- Location in Thailand

Religion
- Affiliation: Hinduism
- District: Prakhon Chai
- Province: Buriram
- Deity: Shankar

Location
- Country: Thailand
- Interactive map of Muang Tam
- Coordinates: 14°29′48″N 102°59′1″E

Architecture
- Type: Khmer architecture
- Completed: 10th Century CE

Prasat Muang Tam (Thai: ปราสาทเมืองต่ำ, RTGS: Prasat Mueang Tam, pronounced [prāː.sàːt mɯ̄aŋ tàm]; lit. 'lowland castle') is a Khmer Hindu Temple in Prakhon Chai District, Buriram Province, Thailand. It is primarily in the Khleang and Baphuon styles, which dates its primary phases of construction to the late-10th and early-11th centuries. The primary deity was Shiva, although Vishnu was also worshipped there.

Like most Hindu temples, Muang Tam is oriented towards the east. It has a flat concentric plan, with a central sanctuary and two surrounded successively by an inner enclosure, ponds, and an outer enclosure. The ponds between the enclosures are an unusual feature of the temple, as is the central sanctuary, which is not elevated and has its towers arranged in rows of three and two. All the towers except the central one have been restored.

Kala are particularly prominent in the lintels of the temple. They are the best available aid in dating the structure, but the mix of styles (Khleang and Baphuon) makes accurate dating impossible. Several of the lintels on the outer gopuras are unfinished.

A small probably contemporaneous with the temple, lay to the east, while a later, larger baray survives further north between Muang Tam and Phanom Rung.

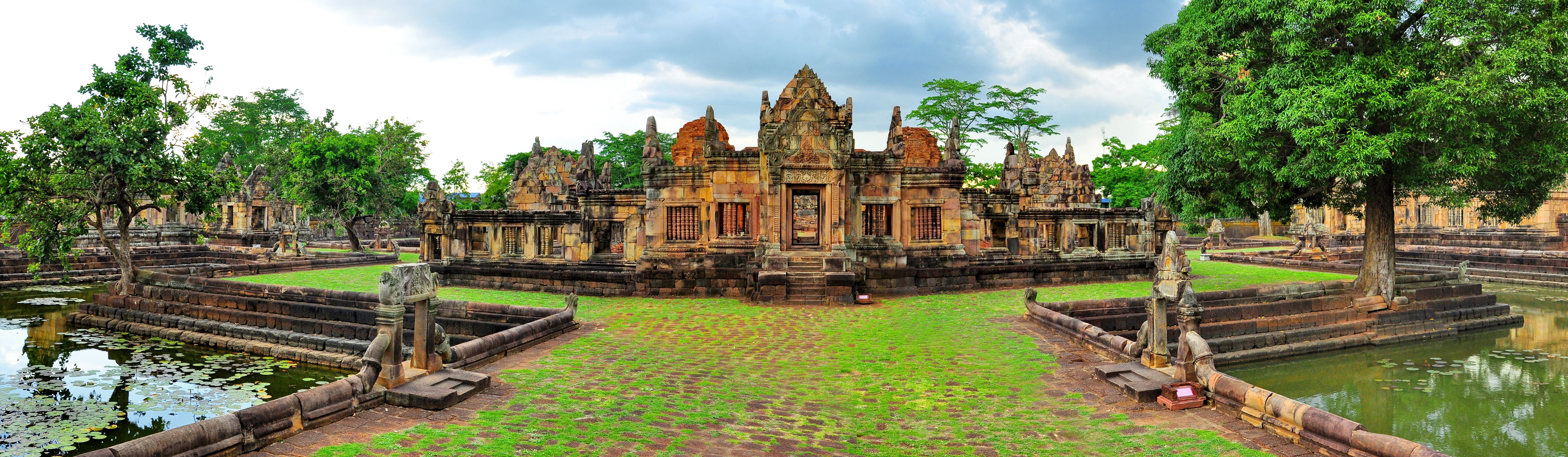
Prasat Hin Muang Tam
