= Ban Kruat district =

Ban Kruat บ้านกรวด
- District
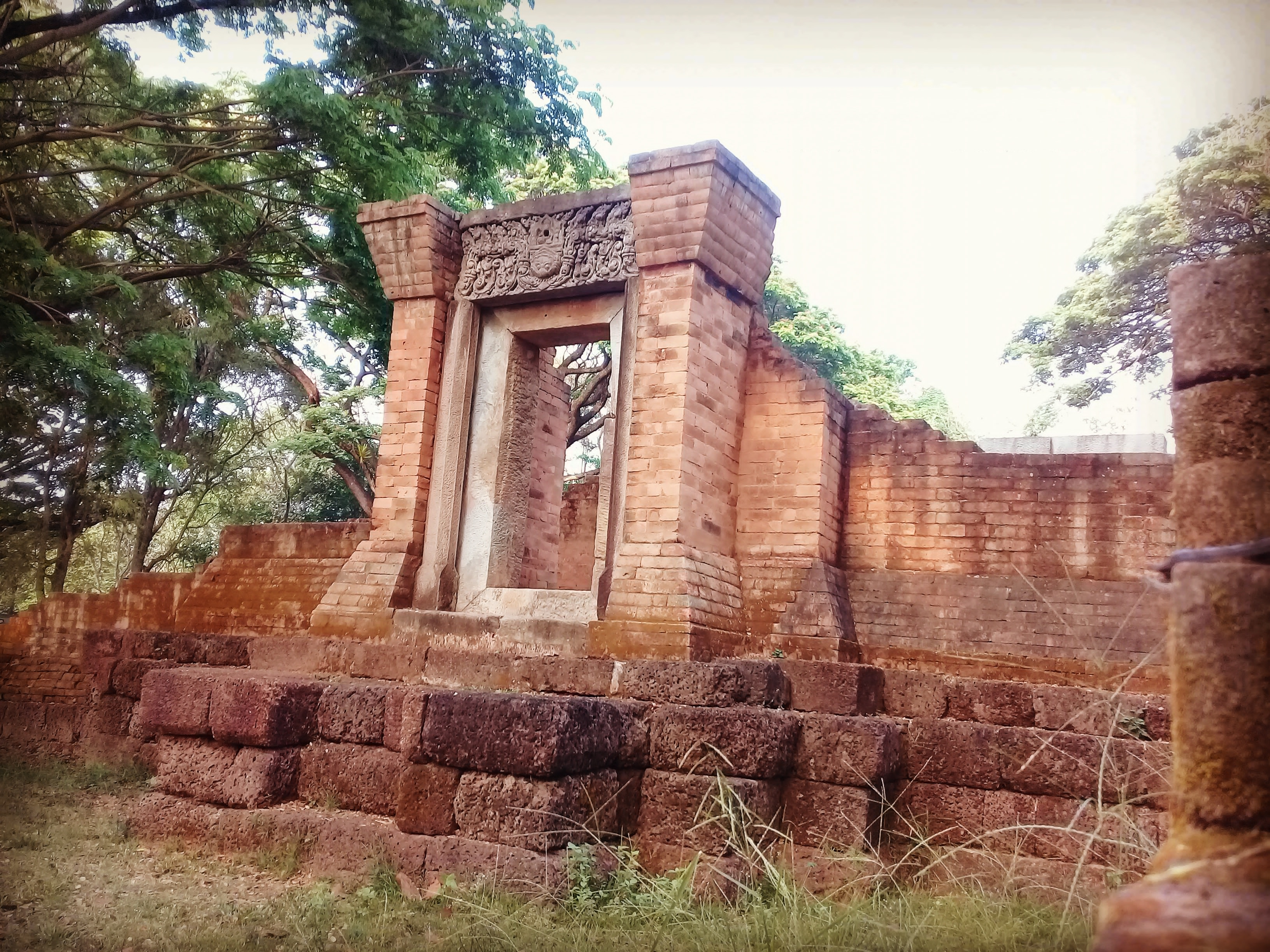
- Prasat Thamo

- District location in Buriram province
- Coordinates: 14°25′18″N 103°6′0″E
- Country: Thailand
- Province: Buriram
- Seat: Ban Kruat

Area
  - Total: 583.9 km^{2} (225.4 sq mi)

Population (2005)
  - Total: 72,124
  - Density: 123.5/km^{2} (320/sq mi)
- Time zone: UTC+7 (ICT)
- Postal code: 31180
- Geocode: 3108

Ban Kruat (Thai: บ้านกรวด, pronounced [bâːn krùa̯t]) is a district (amphoe) of Buriram province, northeastern Thailand.

== History ==
More than two hundred kiln mounds are recorded in the district and in neighbouring Lahan Sai, working between the 10th and the 12th centuries and supplying the Angkorian world with stoneware. Wares from these kilns travelled far to the west: they are among the material found at Ban Nong Chaeng in Don Chedi, Suphan Buri, with Northern and Southern Song ceramics and Northern Song coins.

The district was created in 1938 by splitting the single tambon Ban Kruat from Prakhon Chai district. It was, at first, a minor district (king amphoe). In 1965 it was upgraded to a full district.

== Geography ==
The district is bounded in the south by the Dangrek Range. Neighboring districts are (from the west clockwise) Lahan Sai and Prakhon Chai of Buriram Province, and Prasat and Phanom Dong Rak of Surin province. To the south it borders the province Oddar Meancheay of Cambodia.

== Motto ==
The Ban Kruat District's motto is "The city of metallurgy, ancient porcelain and quarry, beautiful Obok Viewpoint, Makha Dam and border in Phanomdong Rak mountain range."

== Administration ==
The district is divided into nine sub-districts (tambons), which are further subdivided into 122 villages (mubans). There are two sub-district municipalities (thesaban tambons): Ban Kruat covers parts of tambon Ban Kruat and Prasat, and Talad Nikhom Prasat covers further parts of tambon Prasat. There are also nine tambon administrative organizations (TAO) responsible for the non-municipal areas.

No.	Name	Thai name	Villages	Pop.
1.	Ban Kruat	บ้านกรวด	26	9,838
2.	Non Charoen	โนนเจริญ	11	8,537
3.	Nong Mai Ngam	หนองไม้งาม	14	10,121
4.	Prasat	ปราสาท	13	10,341
5.	Sai Taku	สายตะกู	14	8,878
6.	Hin Lat	หินลาด	8	6,296
7.	Bueng Charoen	บึงเจริญ	14	7,000
8.	Chanthop Phet	จันทบเพชร	12	7,157
9.	Khao Din Nuea	เขาดินเหนือ	10	6,326
