= 2026 Thai Women's League 2 =

Thai Women's League 2
- Season: 2026
- Dates: 31 January 2026 – 27 June 2026
- Champions: Khelang United
- Promoted: Khelang United; PTU Tha Khlong
- Relegated: Naluang School; Surin Hinkhon United
- Matches: 56
- Goals: 185 (3.3 per match)
- Biggest home win: 6 goals difference Khelang United 6–0 Surin Hinkhon United (15 March 2026)
- Biggest away win: 4 goals difference Surin Hinkhon United 1–5 Khon Kaen Sports School (20 April 2026); Bangkok Sports School 0–4 Khon Kaen Sports School (20 June 2026)
- Highest scoring: 8 goals Khelang United 5–3 PTU Tha Khlong (20 April 2026)
- Longest winning run: 5 matches Khelang United
- Longest unbeaten run: 9 matches Khelang United
- Longest winless run: 8 matches Surin Hinkhon United
- Longest losing run: 4 matches Bangkok Sports School

The 2026 Thai Women's League 2 is the 9th season of the Thai Women's League 2, the second-tier Thai professional league for women's association football clubs, since its establishment in 2010. A total of 8 teams will compete in the league.

== Teams ==
=== Number of teams by province ===
Position	Province	Number	Teams
1	Bangkok	2	Bangkok Sports School and Naluang School
2	Chonburi	1	Phranakorn
2	Khon Kaen	1	Khon Kaen Sports School
2	Lampang	1	Khelang United
2	Pathum Thani	1	PTU Tha Khlong
2	Sisaket	1	Sisaket
2	Surin	1	Surin Hinkhon United

=== Stadiums and locations ===
Locations of the 2026 Thai Women's League 2 teams

Team	Location	Stadium	Coordinates
Bangkok Sports School	Bangkok (Thung Khru)	72nd Anniversary Stadium, Bang Mot	13°38′48″N 100°29′34″E
Khelang United	Lampang (Mueang)	Lampang Sports School Artificial Pitch	18°19′11″N 99°29′16″E
Khon Kaen Sports School	Khon Kaen (Mueang)	Stadium of Khon Kaen Sports School	16°27′21″N 102°56′49″E
Naluang School	Bangkok (Thung Khru)	72nd Anniversary Stadium, Bang Mot	13°38′48″N 100°29′34″E
Phranakorn	Chonburi (Mueang)	Chonburi Sports School Artificial Pitch	13°24′45″N 100°59′33″E
PTU Tha Khlong	Pathum Thani (Khlong Luang)	Stadium of Valaya Alongkorn Rajabhat University under the Royal Patronage	14°08′00″N 100°36′25″E
Sisaket	Sisaket (Mueang)	Stadium of Sisaket Sports School	15°06′14″N 104°20′17″E
Surin Hinkhon United	Surin (Kap Choeng)	Khok Takhian Stadium	14°33′30″N 103°30′16″E

=== Foreign players ===
A Thai Women's League 2 team could register 3 foreign players from foreign players all around the world. A team can use 3 foreign players on the field in each game.

Note :
(substituted off) : players who released during second leg transfer window;
(substituted on) : players who registered during second leg transfer window.

AFC member countries players.
CAF member countries players.
CONCACAF member countries players.
CONMEBOL member countries players.
OFC member countries players.
UEFA member countries players.
No foreign player registered.

Club	Leg	Player 1	Player 2	Player 3
Bangkok Sports School	1st
Bangkok Sports School	2nd
Khelang United	1st
Khelang United	2nd
Khon Kaen Sports School	1st
Khon Kaen Sports School	2nd
Naluang School	1st
Naluang School	2nd
Phranakorn	1st	(Netherlands) Olivia Jordan Ravesloot	(United States) Maggie Wood	(Australia) Mackenzie Lea Hornman
Phranakorn	2nd	(Netherlands) Olivia Jordan Ravesloot	(United States) Maggie Wood	(Australia) Mackenzie Lea Hornman
PTU Tha Khlong	1st
PTU Tha Khlong	2nd
Sisaket	1st
Sisaket	2nd
Surin Hinkhon United	1st
Surin Hinkhon United	2nd

== League table ==
=== Standings ===
Pos	Team	Pld	W	D	L	GF	GA	GD	Pts	Qualification or relegation
1	Khelang United (C, P)	14	9	3	2	40	19	+21	30	Promotion to 2027 Thai Women's League 1
2	PTU Tha Khlong (P)	14	7	2	5	25	23	+2	23	Promotion to 2027 Thai Women's League 1
3	Khon Kaen Sports School	14	7	1	6	27	19	+8	22	
4	Bangkok Sports School	14	6	2	6	17	19	−2	20	
5	Phranakorn	14	5	4	5	15	11	+4	19	
6	Sisaket	14	5	2	7	26	33	−7	17 (Note: Sisaket ahead on head-to-head points record; Sisaket 4 pts, Naluang School 1 pt.)	
7	Naluang School (R)	14	4	5	5	18	20	−2	17	Relegation to 2027 Thai Women's League 2 qualification
8	Surin Hinkhon United (R)	14	2	3	9	17	41	−24	9	Relegation to 2027 Thai Women's League 2 qualification

Source: Thai League
Rules for classification: 1) Points; 2) Head-to-head points; 3) Head-to-head goal difference; 4) Head-to-head goal scored; 5) Overall goal difference; 6) Overall goal scored; 7) Fair play points; 8) Play-off without extra time).
(C) Champions; (P) Promoted; (R) Relegated

=== Positions by round ===
Team ╲ Round	1	2	3	4	5	6	7	8	9	10	11	12	13	14
Khelang United	1	2	5	4	3	1	1	1	1	1	1	1	1	1
PTU Tha Khlong	3	1	1	3	2	2	3	3	4	3	3	3	2	2
Khon Kaen Sports School	5	4	3	2	4	4	5	4	3	4	4	4	4	3
Bangkok Sports School	4	5	2	1	1	3	2	2	2	2	2	2	3	4
Phranakorn	6	7	7	8	8	8	8	7	7	6	5	7	7	5
Sisaket	8	8	8	6	5	6	6	6	6	7	7	6	6	6
Naluang School	2	3	4	5	6	5	4	5	5	5	6	5	5	7
Surin Hinkhon United	7	6	6	7	7	7	7	8	8	8	8	8	8	8

Source: Thai League
= Leader and promotion to 2027 Thai Women's League 1; = Promotion to 2027 Thai Women's League 1; = Relegation to 2027 Thai Women's League 2 qualification

=== Results by round ===
Team ╲ Round	1	2	3	4	5	6	7	8	9	10	11	12	13	14
Khelang United	W	D	L	W	W	W	W	W	D	W	D	W	L	W
PTU Tha Khlong	W	W	W	L	W	L	D	L	L	W	W	D	L	W
Khon Kaen Sports School	L	W	W	W	L	L	L	W	W	L	L	D	W	W
Bangkok Sports School	W	L	W	W	W	L	W	D	W	D	L	L	L	L
Phranakorn	L	L	D	L	L	D	W	D	D	W	W	L	W	W
Sisaket	L	L	L	W	W	D	L	D	L	L	W	W	W	L
Naluang School	W	D	D	L	L	W	D	D	D	L	L	W	W	L
Surin Hinkhon United	L	W	L	L	L	W	L	L	D	D	D	L	L	L

Source: Thai League
W = Won; D = Drawn; L = Lost

=== Results ===
Home \ Away	BKS	KLU	KKS	NLS	PNK	PTK	SKT	SHU
Bangkok Sports School	—	1–2	0–4	1–0	2–1	3–2	1–2	0–0
Khelang United	4–1	—	1–0	0–0	3–1	5–3	5–1	6–0
Khon Kaen Sports School	0–1	2–1	—	4–0	0–3	0–0	3–2	2–1
Naluang School	2–0	2–2	3–2	—	1–1	0–1	1–1	4–1
Phranakorn	0–0	0–1	2–0	2–0	—	0–2	2–0	0–1
PTU Tha Khlong	1–0	1–4	3–1	1–1	0–2	—	3–2	4–1
Sisaket	1–4	4–3	1–4	3–1	0–0	1–2	—	4–2
Surin Hinkhon United	0–3	3–3	1–5	1–3	1–1	3–2	2–4	—

Source: Thai League
Legend: Blue = home team win; Yellow = draw; Red = away team win.
For upcoming matches, an "a" indicates there is an article about the rivalry between the two participants.
