= Chaloem Phra Kiat district, Buriram =

Chaloem Phra Kiat เฉลิมพระเกียรติ
- District
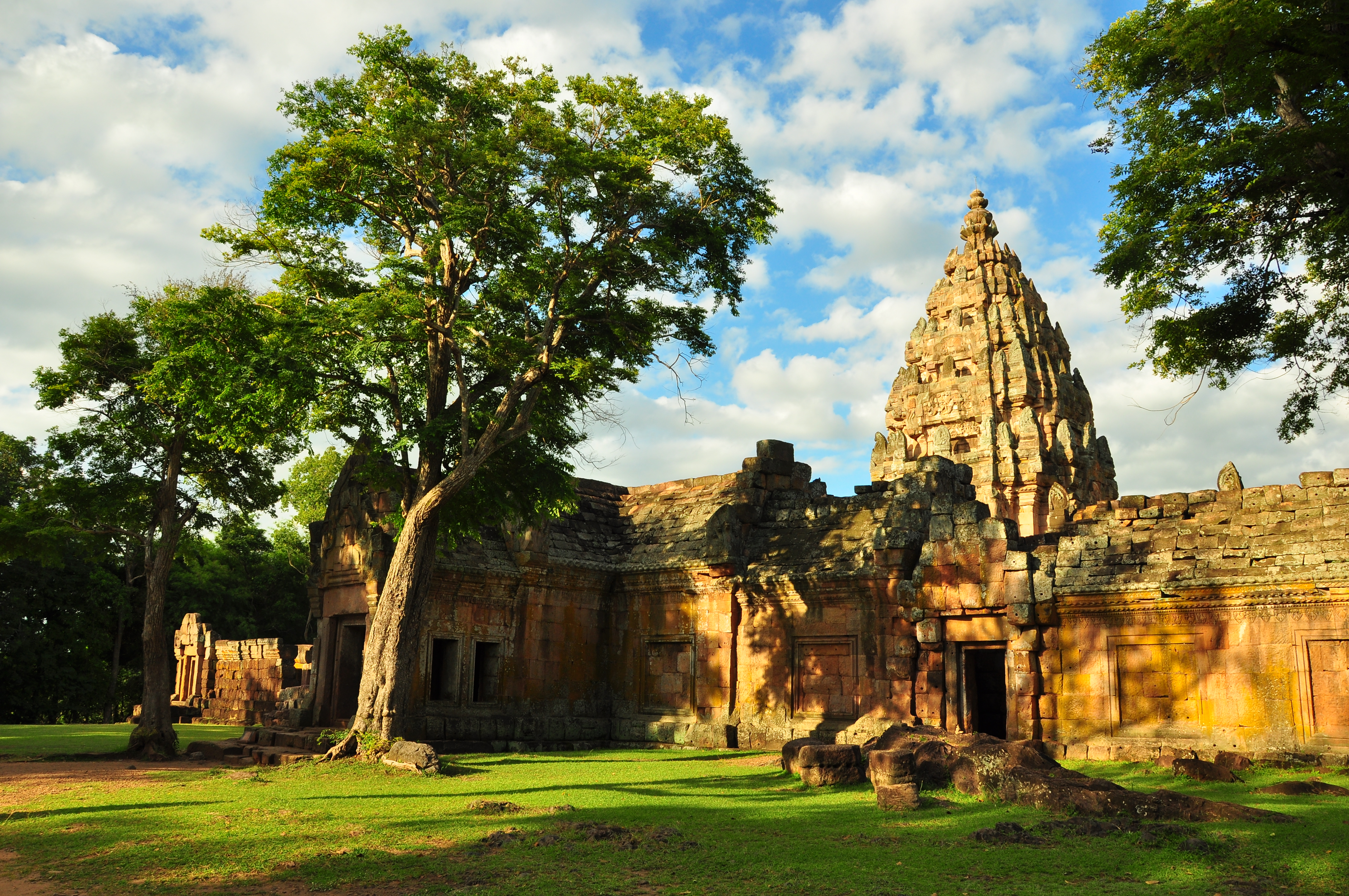
- Phanom Rung Historical Park

- District location in Buriram province
- Coordinates: 14°33′30″N 102°55′30″E
- Country: Thailand
- Province: Buriram
- Seat: Ta Pek

Area
  - Total: 349.7 km^{2} (135.0 sq mi)

Population (2005)
  - Total: 39,796
  - Density: 113.8/km^{2} (295/sq mi)
- Time zone: UTC+7 (ICT)
- Postal code: 31110
- Geocode: 3123

Chaloem Phra Kiat (Thai: เฉลิมพระเกียรติ, pronounced [tɕʰā.lɤ̌ːm pʰráʔ kìat]; Northeastern Thai: เฉลิมพระเกียรติ, pronounced [sā.lɤ̌ːm pʰàʔ kìat]), aka Phanom Rung district is a district (amphoe) of Buriram province, northeastern Thailand.

== History ==
The district was created on 5 December 1996, together with four other districts and renamed Chaloem Phra Kiat in celebration of the 50th anniversary of King Bhumibol Adulyadej's ascension to the throne.

The district was composed of the tambons Charoen Suk, Ta Pek and Isan Khet of Nang Rong district and tambon Thawon and Yai Yaem Watthana of Lahan Sai district.

== Geography ==
Neighboring districts are (from the east clockwise) Prakhon Chai, Lahan Sai and Nang Rong.

== Motto ==
The Chaloem Phra Kiat District's motto is "City of Phanom Rung, field of yellow cotton flowers, the royal district's name, Narai lintel, Prasat Tong Shrine, Poo Ak-kha-nee cloth."

== Administration ==
The district is divided into five sub-districts (tambons), which are further subdivided into 71 villages (mubans). Phanom Rung is a township (thesaban tambon) which covers almost the complete tambon Ta Pek and parts of tambon Isan Khet. There are a further four tambon administrative organizations (TAO).

No.	Name	Thai name	Villages	Pop.
1.	Charoen Suk	เจริญสุข	14	6,483
2.	Ta Pek	ตาเป๊ก	15	8,872
3.	Isan Khet	อีสานเขต	15	8,360
4.	Thawon	ถาวร	11	7,517
5.	Yai Yaem Watthana	ยายแย้มวัฒนา	16	8,564
