= Prakhon Chai district =

Prakhon Chai ประโคนชัย
- Amphoe
- Amphoe location in Buriram province
- Coordinates: 14°36′24″N 103°7′18″E
- Country: Thailand
- Province: Buriram
- Seat: Prakhon Chai

Area
  - Total: 890.121 km^{2} (343.678 sq mi)

Population (2005)
  - Total: 132,141
  - Density: 147.3/km^{2} (382/sq mi)
- Time zone: UTC+7 (ICT)
- Postal code: 31140
- Geocode: 3107

Prakhon Chai (Thai: ประโคนชัย, pronounced [prā.kʰōːn tɕʰāj]; Northeastern Thai: ประโคนชัย, pronounced [pā.kʰôːn sâj]) is a district (amphoe) in the southern part of Buriram province, northeastern Thailand. The district lies approximately 50 km south of Buriram City.

== Geography ==
Neighbouring districts are (from the south clockwise) Ban Kruat, Lahan Sai, Chaloem Phra Kiat, Nang Rong, Mueang Buriram, Phlapphla Chai of Buriram Province and Prasat of Surin province.

== History ==
The district was renamed from Talung (ตะลุง) to Prakhon Chai in 1939.

In 1964, artwork depicting Buddhist figures, including Avalokitesvara, was discovered in Prakhon Chai. Originating from the pre-Angkor period, these figures reflect traditional Indian styles, as passed down through the Cambodian tradition of the Chenla Kingdom.

== Motto ==
The Prakhon Chai District's Motto is "The Best of culture, Prasat Muang Tam, Jasmine rice, shrimp ferment, The Bird park and People are kind."

== Administration ==
The district is divided into 16 sub-districts (tambon), which are further subdivided into 199 villages (muban). Prakhon Chai is a township (thesaban tambon) which covers parts of tambon Prakhon Chai. There are also 16 tambon administrative organizations (TAO).

No.	Name	Thai	Villages	Pop.
1.	Prakhon Chai	ประโคนชัย	30	18,127
2.	Salaeng Thon	แสลงโทน	7	5,887
3.	Ban Sai	บ้านไทร	12	9,473
5.	Lawia	ละเวี้ย	13	9,789
6.	Chorakhe Mak	จรเข้มาก	18	11,519
7.	Pang Ku	ปังกู	14	9,938
8.	Khok Yang	โคกย่าง	9	4,371
10.	Khok Ma	โคกม้า	10	7,226
13.	Phaisan	ไพศาล	16	11,575
14.	Tako Taphi	ตะโกตาพิ	11	7,047
15.	Khao Khok	เขาคอก	15	9,797
16.	Nong Bon	หนองบอน	11	7,778
18.	Khok Makham	โคกมะขาม	7	4,182
19.	Khok Tum	โคกตูม	10	5,728
20.	Prathat Bu	ประทัดบุ	8	4,082
21.	Si Liam	สี่เหลี่ยม	8	5,622

Missing numbers are tambons which now form Phlapphla Chai District.
