= Prasat Ban Phluang =

Khmer Buddhist temple

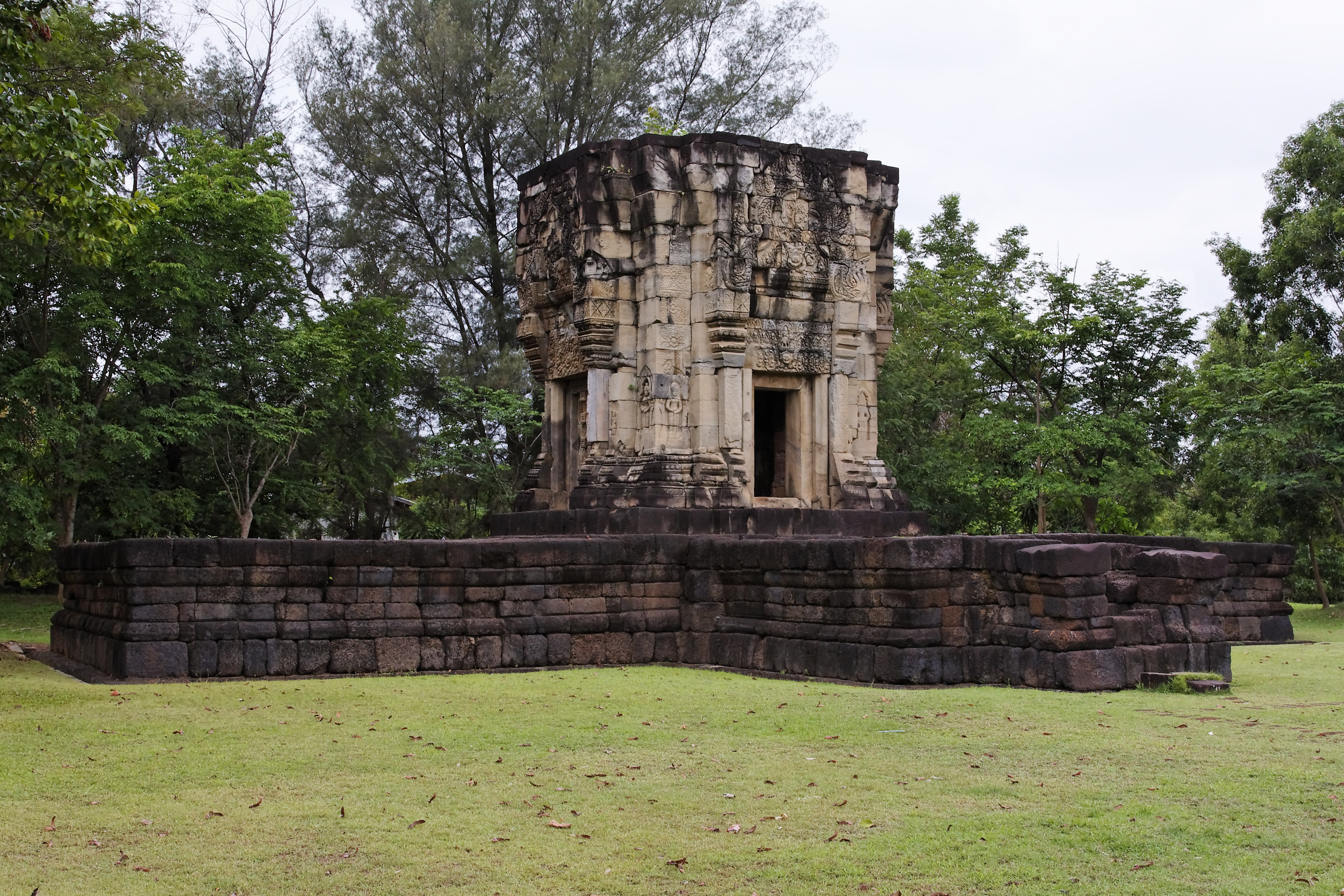

Religion
- Affiliation: Buddhism
- District: Prasat
- Province: Surin

Location
- Location: Ban Phluang village
- Country: Thailand
- Interactive map of Prasat Ban Phluang
- Coordinates: 14.593°N 103.365°E

Architecture
- Completed: Second half of the 11th century

Prasat Ban Phluang is an ancient Khmer Buddhist temple in Prasat district, Surin province, Thailand. It was built during the second half of the 11th century in the Khmer architectural style to honor Shiva. The towers were reconfigured between 1558 and 1657 by Laotian Buddhist monarchs who rebuilt the towers in a style similar to Si Khoraphum Temple in Surin and nearby Ban Muang Chan.

== Description ==
Built in the second half of the 11th century during the reign of Udayadityavarman II in the Khmer Baphuon architectural style, the temple is in Ban Phluang village 33 kilometres south of the town of Surin.

The site consists of a single tower built of sandstone on a laterite base surrounded by a U-shaped moat. The base is 8 metres wide and 23 metres long and sufficient to accommodate three towers and an entrance hall which suggests that the structure is unfinished possibly due to lack of funds. The upper section of the tower is missing and, as no further stone blocks were found at the site, it may also have been left unfinished or have been made of wood. To the east is a large baray or pond.

The tower has a single door facing east and three false doors on each of its sides. The lintels above the doors contain carvings of the highest order. Over the main door is Indra riding the elephant Airavata with a single head instead of the usual three. Below is a Kala face spewing garlands from its mouth and above a frieze of six meditating rishis or sages. Within the pediment above the lintel is Krishna raising Mount Govardhana with cattle and their keepers at his feet. Two dvarapalas or guardians stand in the door frame. The south lintel shows Indra on a three-headed elephant and the north lintel shows Krishna killing the serpent Kaliya.

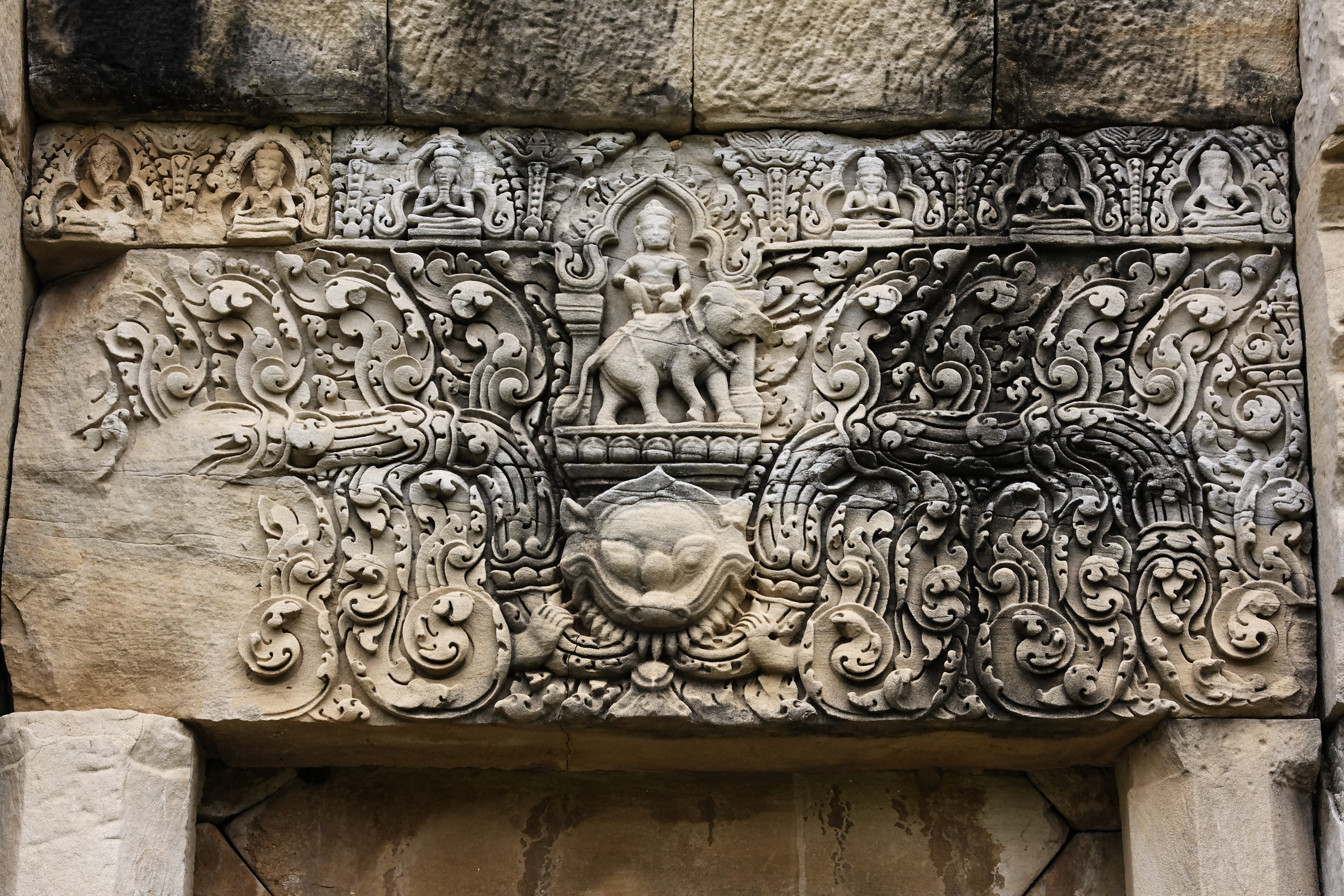
Lintel above the entrance

Pottery fragments sufficient for up to 300 vases were found at the site which were probably used in religious rituals. The site was restored in 1973 by American archaeologist Vance Childress.
