= Prasat district =

Prasat ปราสาท
- District
- District location in Surin province
- Coordinates: 14°38′26″N 103°24′17″E
- Country: Thailand
- Province: Surin
- Seat: Kang Aen
- Subdistrict: 18
- Muban: 241
- District established: 1938

Area
  - Total: 908.386 km^{2} (350.730 sq mi)

Population (2015)
  - Total: 156,900
  - Density: 169.1/km^{2} (438/sq mi)
- Time zone: UTC+7 (ICT)
- Postal code: 32140
- Geocode: 3205

Prasat (Thai: ปราสาท, pronounced [prāː.sàːt]) is a district (amphoe) in the southern part of Surin province, northeastern Thailand.

== Geography ==
Neighboring districts are (from the north clockwise): Mueang Surin, Lamduan, Sangkha, Kap Choeng, and Phanom Dong Rak of Surin Province; Ban Kruat, Prakhon Chai, Phlapphla Chai, and Krasang of Buriram province.

== History ==
The area of the district was originally part of Mueang Surin district. It was split off as a separate district on 4 March 1938, consisting of the seven tambons: Kang Aen, Bakdai, Ta Bao, Prue, Thung Mon, Phlai, and Thamo.

== Administration ==
=== Central administration ===
Prasat district is divided into 18 sub-districts (tambons), which are further subdivided into 241 administrative villages (mubans).

No.	Name	Thai	Villages	Pop.
1.	Kang Aen	กังแอน	18	18,837
2.	Thamo	ทมอ	13	6,599
3.	Phlai	ไพล	12	5,866
4.	Prue	ปรือ	19	11,566
5.	Thung Mon	ทุ่งมน	11	7,187
6.	Ta Bao	ตาเบา	19	9,062
7.	Nong Yai	หนองใหญ่	17	11,828
8.	Khok Yang	โคกยาง	18	14,112
9.	Khok Sa-at	โคกสะอาด	20	11,354
10.	Ban Sai	บ้านไทร	9	6,576
11.	Chok Na Sam	โชคนาสาม	14	11,457
12.	Chuea Phloeng	เชื้อเพลิง	12	7,756
13.	Prasat Thanong	ปราสาททนง	11	5,218
14.	Tani	ตานี	9	7,208
15.	Ban Phluang	บ้านพลวง	14	7,874
16.	Kantuatramuan	กันตวจระมวล	8	5,680
17.	Samut	สมุด	8	4,119
18.	Prathat Bu	ประทัดบุ	9	4,601

=== Local administration ===
There are three sub-district municipalities (thesaban tambons) in the district:

- Kang Aen (Thai: เทศบาลตำบลกังแอน) consisting of parts of sub-district Kang Aen.
- Nikhon Prasat (Thai: เทศบาลตำบลนิคมปราสาท) consisting of parts of sub-district Prue.
- Kantuatramuan (Thai: เทศบาลตำบลกันตวจระมวล) consisting of sub-district Kantuatramuan.

There are 17 sub-district administrative organizations (SAO) in the district:

- Kang Aen (Thai: องค์การบริหารส่วนตำบลกังแอน) consisting of parts of sub-district Kang Aen.
- Thamo (Thai: องค์การบริหารส่วนตำบลทมอ) consisting of sub-district Thamo.
- Phlai (Thai: องค์การบริหารส่วนตำบลไพล) consisting of sub-district Phlai.
- Prue (Thai: องค์การบริหารส่วนตำบลปรือ) consisting of parts of sub-district Prue.
- Thung Mon (Thai: องค์การบริหารส่วนตำบลทุ่งมน) consisting of sub-district Thung Mon.
- Ta Bao (Thai: องค์การบริหารส่วนตำบลตาเบา) consisting of sub-district Ta Bao.
- Nong Yai (Thai: องค์การบริหารส่วนตำบลหนองใหญ่) consisting of sub-district Nong Yai.
- Khok Yang (Thai: องค์การบริหารส่วนตำบลโคกยาง) consisting of sub-district Khok Yang.
- Khok Sa-at (Thai: องค์การบริหารส่วนตำบลโคกสะอาด) consisting of sub-district Khok Sa-at.
- Ban Sai (Thai: องค์การบริหารส่วนตำบลบ้านไทร) consisting of sub-district Ban Sai.
- Chok Na Sam (Thai: องค์การบริหารส่วนตำบลโชคนาสาม) consisting of sub-district Chok Na Sam.
- Chuea Phloeng (Thai: องค์การบริหารส่วนตำบลเชื้อเพลิง) consisting of sub-district Chuea Phloeng.
- Prasat Thanong (Thai: องค์การบริหารส่วนตำบลปราสาททนง) consisting of sub-district Prasat Thanong.
- Tani (Thai: องค์การบริหารส่วนตำบลตานี) consisting of sub-district Tani.
- Ban Phluang (Thai: องค์การบริหารส่วนตำบลบ้านพลวง) consisting of sub-district Ban Phluang.
- Samut (Thai: องค์การบริหารส่วนตำบลสมุด) consisting of sub-district Samut.
- Prathat Bu (Thai: องค์การบริหารส่วนตำบลประทัดบุ) consisting of sub-district Prathat Bu.
