= Chaloem Phra Kiat district =

There are five amphoe (districts) named Chaloem Phra Kiat (Thai: เฉลิมพระเกียรติ) in Thailand. All were created in 1996 in celebration of the 50th anniversary of King Bhumibol Adulyadej's accession to the throne, becoming effective on December 5, the birthday of the King. Chaloem Phra Kiat is an honorific way of addressing a member of the royal family.

- Chaloem Phra Kiat, Buriram province
- Chaloem Phra Kiat, Nakhon Ratchasima province
- Chaloem Phra Kiat, Nakhon Si Thammarat province
- Chaloem Phra Kiat, Nan province
- Chaloem Phra Kiat, Saraburi province
