= Phanom Dong Rak district =

Phanom Dong Rak พนมดงรัก
- District
- District location in Surin province
- Coordinates: 14°26′44″N 103°18′16″E
- Country: Thailand
- Province: Surin
- Seat: Bakdai

Area
  - Total: 318.0 km^{2} (122.8 sq mi)

Population (2005)
  - Total: 35,968
  - Density: 107.4/km^{2} (278/sq mi)
- Time zone: UTC+7 (ICT)
- Postal code: 32140
- Geocode: 3214

Phanom Dong Rak (Thai: พนมดงรัก, pronounced [pʰā.nōm dōŋ rák]) is the southwesternmost district (amphoe) of Surin province, northeastern Thailand.

== History ==
The area was separated from Kap Choeng district and made a minor district (king amphoe) on 1 April 1995.

On 15 May 2007, all 81 minor districts were upgraded to full districts. On 24 August the upgrade became official.

== Geography ==
Neighboring districts are (from the west clockwise): Ban Kruat of Buriram province; Prasat, Kap Choeng of Surin Province; and Oddar Meancheay of Cambodia.

The district is in the Phanom Dong Rak Range, the hills that form a boundary between Thailand and Cambodia. The name of the district translates as 'Dongrak Mountains'.

== Administration ==
The district is divided into four sub-districts (tambons), which are further subdivided into 55 villages (mubans). There are no municipal (thesaban) areas. There are four tambon administrative organizations (TAO).

No.	Name	Thai name	Villages	Pop.
1.	Bakdai	บักได	20	11,432
2.	Khok Klang	โคกกลาง	11	6,826
3.	Chik Daek	จีกแดก	12	7,668
4.	Ta Miang	ตาเมียง	12	10,042
