= Kap Choeng district =

Kap Choeng กาบเชิง
- District
- District location in Surin province
- Coordinates: 14°28′29″N 103°35′39″E
- Country: Thailand
- Province: Surin
- Seat: Kap Choeng

Area
  - Total: 574.0 km^{2} (221.6 sq mi)

Population (2005)
  - Total: 59,589
  - Density: 103.8/km^{2} (269/sq mi)
- Time zone: UTC+7 (ICT)
- Postal code: 32210
- Geocode: 3206

Kap Choeng (Thai: กาบเชิง, pronounced [kàːp t͡ɕʰɤ̄ːŋ]) is a district (amphoe) in the southern part of Surin province, northeastern Thailand.

== History ==
The village of Ban Kap Choeng is about 200 years old. It was originally under sub-district (tambon) Dan of Sangkha district, but 1937 was moved to Tambon Nong Yai, Prasat district. In 1964, it became part of the newly created sub-district of Kap Choeng.

On 25 May 1975, Tambon Kap Choeng and Bakdai were combined to form a minor district (king amphoe). Tambon Khok Klang was created in 1976, Tambons Dan and Khu Tan were transferred to it from Sangkha in 1977. On 20 March 1979, Kap Choeng was upgraded to a full district.

== Geography ==
Neighboring districts are (from the west clockwise): Phanom Dong Rak, Prasat and Sangkha of Surin Province. To the south is Oddar Meancheay of Cambodia.

The southern part of this district is in the Dângrêk Mountains. An international border crossing into Cambodia is called the Chong Chom Checkpoint which is located in Dan village in the southern part of this district. The checkpoint on the Cambodian side is called O Smach International Checkpoint in Samraong Municipality, Oddar Meanchey province.

== Administration ==
The district is divided into six sub-districts (tambons), which are further subdivided into 91 villages (mubans). There are no municipal (thesaban) areas. There are six tambon administrative organizations (TAO).

No.	Name	Thai name	Villages	Pop.
1.	Kap Choeng	กาบเชิง	19	14,123
4.	Khu Tan	คูตัน	14	5,601
5.	Dan	ด่าน	17	12,729
6.	Naeng Mut	แนงมุด	15	10,594
7.	Khok Takhian	โคกตะเคียน	13	11,435
10.	Takhian	ตะเคียน	13	5,107

Missing numbers are tambons which now form Phanom Dong Rak District.
