= Phanom Rung Historical Park =

Hindu-Buddhist temple in Buriram Province, Thailand

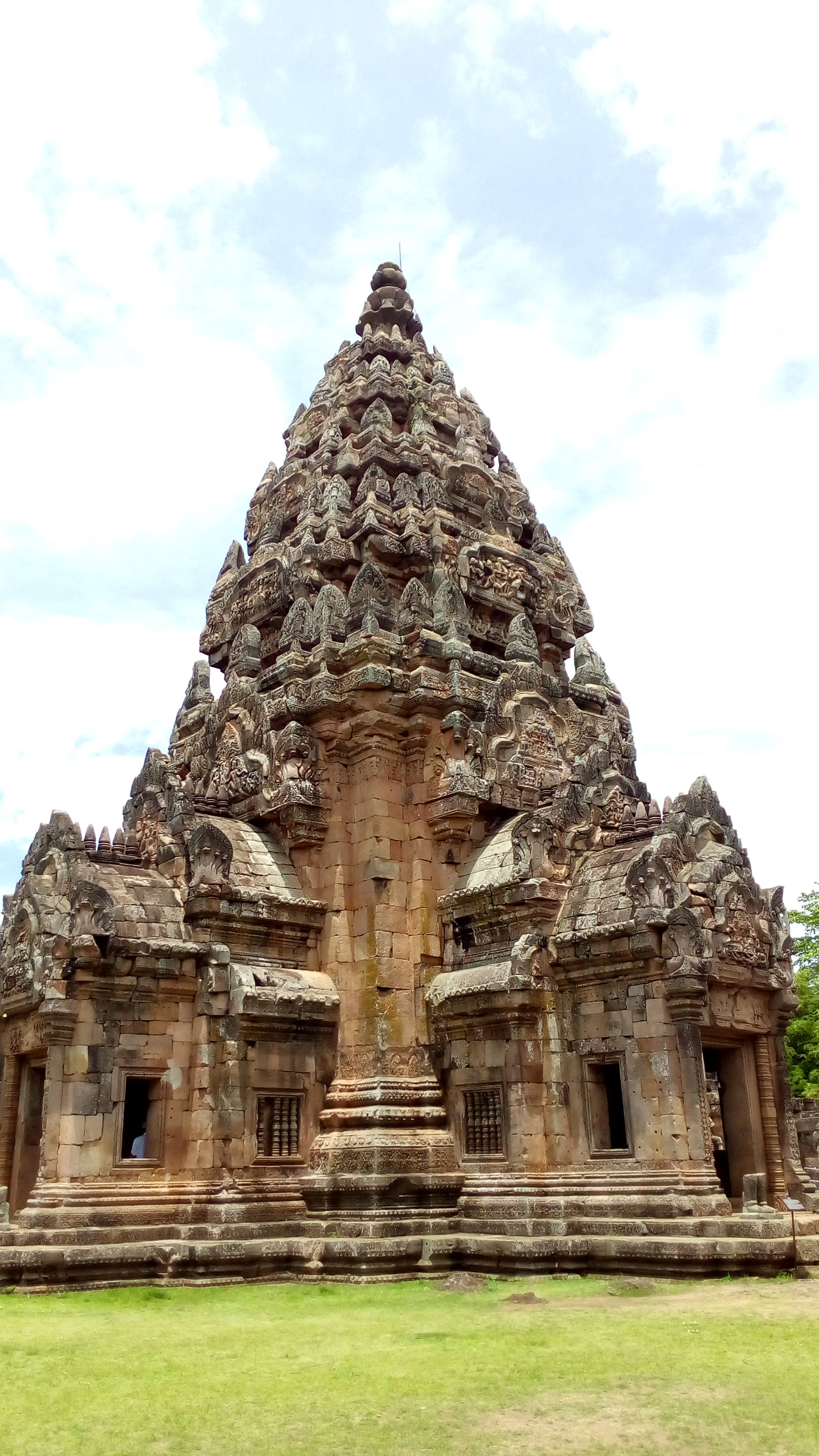

- Location in Thailand

Religion
- Affiliation: Buddhism
- District: Chaloem Phra Kiat
- Province: Buriram
- Deity: The Buddha; Shiva (formerly)

Location
- Country: Thailand
- Coordinates: 14°31′57″N 102°56′30″E

Architecture
- Type: Khmer
- Completed: 10th–13th centuries

Phanom Rung Historical Park is an archaeological site in Thailand, covering the ruins of Prasat Phanom Rung (Thai: ปราสาทพนมรุ้ง, pronounced [prāː.sàːt pʰā.nōm.rúŋ]), a Buddhist-Hindu Khmer Empire temple complex set on the rim of an extinct volcano at 402 metres (1,319 ft) elevation. It is located in Buriram Province in the Isan region of Thailand, and was built at a time when Khmer social-political influences were significant in Srisaket. It was built of sandstone and laterite between the 10th and 13th centuries. It was built on an extinct volcano, it is originally a Hindu religious site and later became a Buddhist site.

The Phanom Rung sanctuary compound was constructed over several phases, dated by means of iconography of its art and architectural styles together with its inscriptions. These comprise two foundations of sacred brick buildings of 10th century C.E., the minor sanctuary of 11th century, the central sanctuary built by King Suryavarman II in 12th century and two Bannalais (libraries) of the 13th century. Further sacred buildings built in the reign of King Jayavarman VII in 13th century, including the Royal attire Changing Pavilion, the Kudi Rishis of Nong Bua Ray, the medical centre or hospital (Arokayasala) and Prasat Ban Bu, a rest house with fire where travelers could shelter (Dharmasala) on the plain at the foot of Phanom Rung, alongside the road linking Angkor and Phimai. These evidence an important vice-regal centre on and around the mountain that flourishes from the 10th to the 13th centuries.

Thailand's Department of Fine Arts spent 17 years restoring the complex to its original state from 1971 to 1988. On 21 May 1988, the park was officially opened by Princess Maha Chakri Sirindhorn. In 2005, the temple was submitted to UNESCO for consideration as a future World Heritage Site.

== Site ==
Phanom Rung is an extinct volcano 386 metres (1,266 ft) in elevation in Ta Pek subdistrict, Chaloem Phra Kiat district, Buriram. The name comes from Khmer: ភ្នំរុង, meaning 'large mountain'.

== Architecture ==
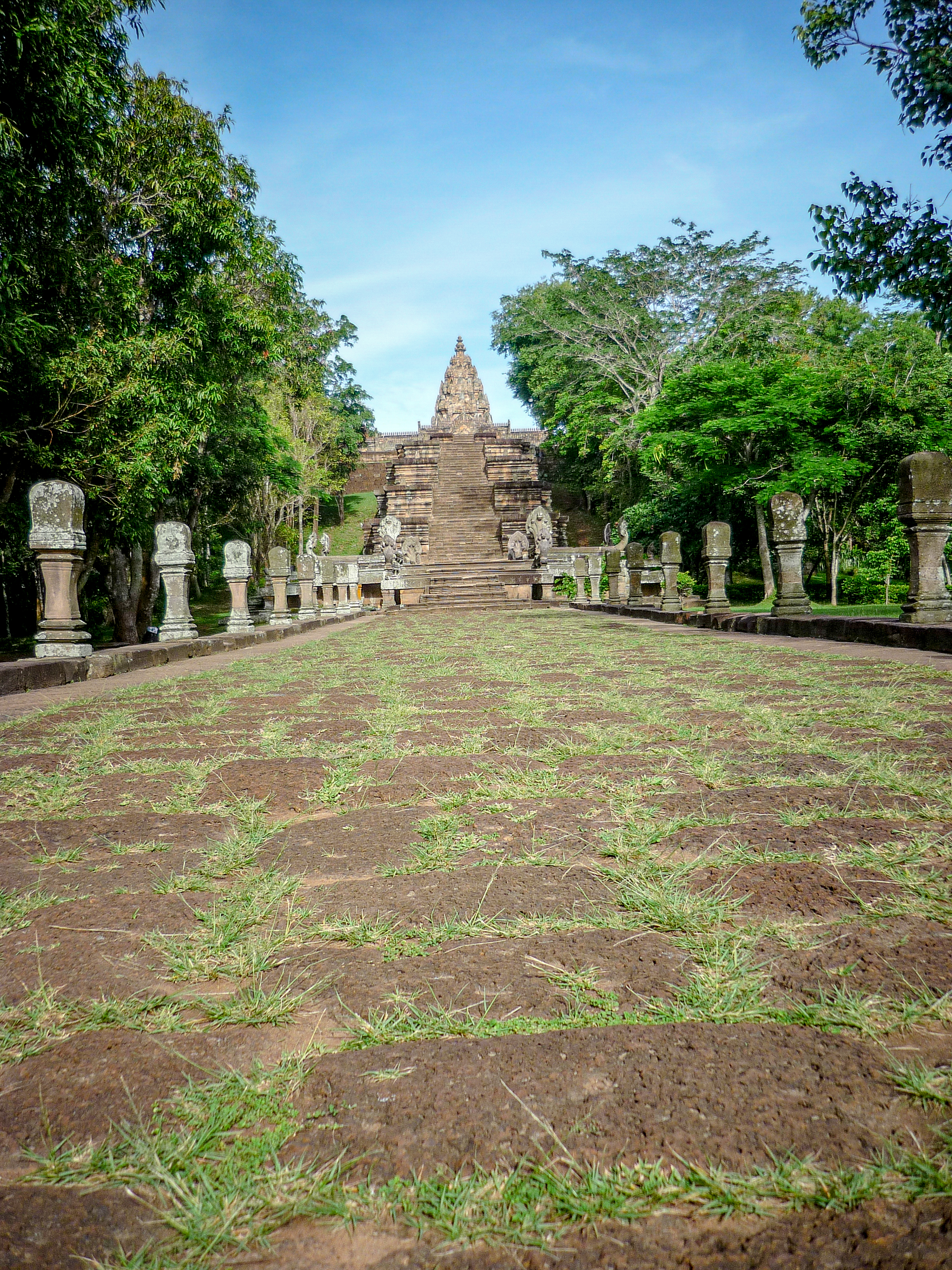
Stone-paved Naga causeway ascending toward the main sanctuary of Prasat Phanom Rung

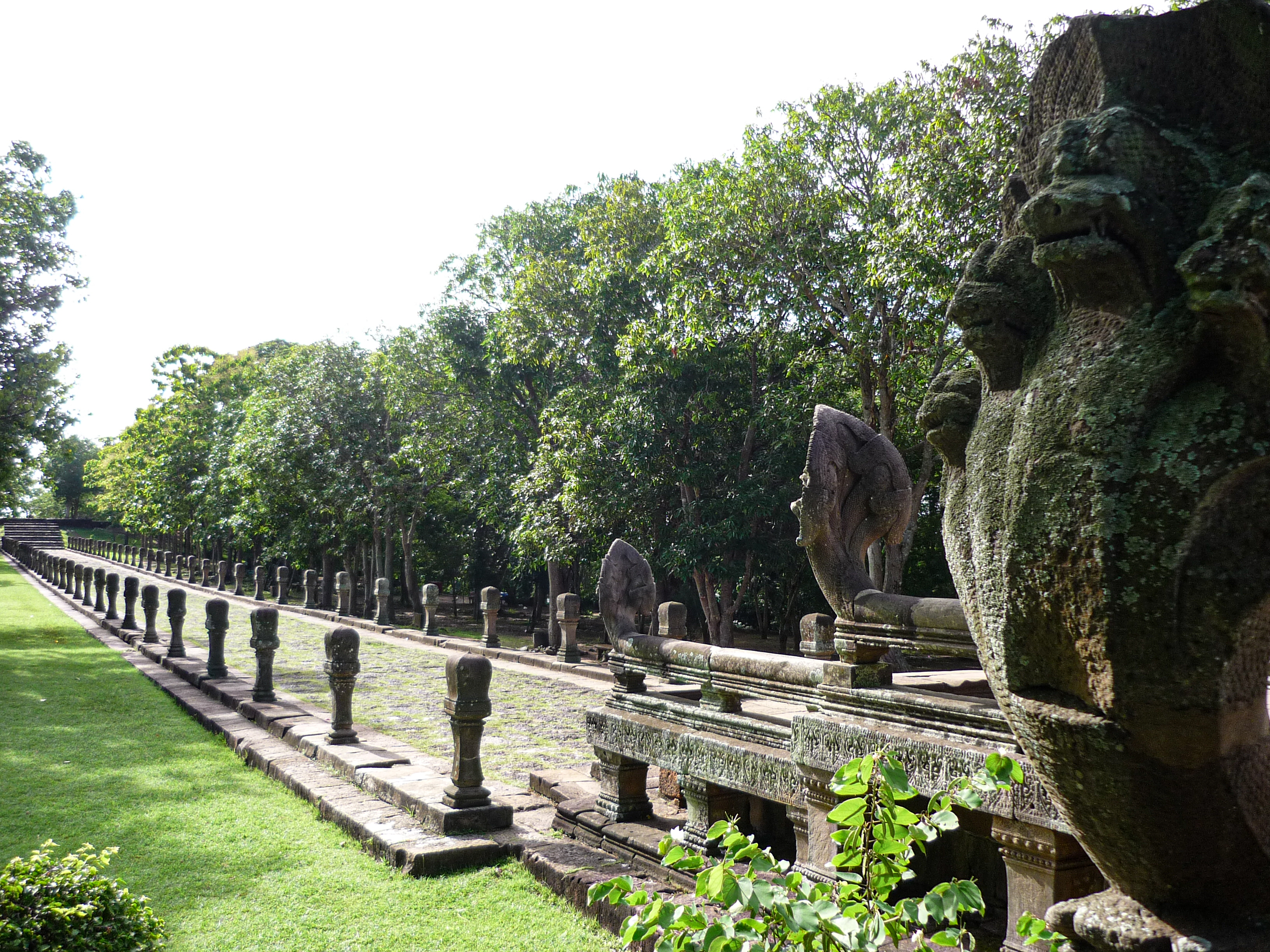
The Naga causeway

After the three-leveled lower stairway is the first cruciform platform, giving a first peek at the main temple. On the right, northward, is Phlab Phla or the White Elephant House. The pavilion is believed to be the place where kings and the royal family would change attire before rituals. Royalty would then enter the processional walkway, one of the most impressive elements of the park. It is 160 meters long and bordered by seventy sandstone posts with tops of lotus buds. The walkway itself is paved with laterite blocks.

The walkway leads to the first of three naga bridges. The five-headed snakes face all four directions and are from the 12th century. This bridge represents the connection between heaven and earth. The naga bridge leads to the upper stairway, which is divided into five sets. Each set has terraces on the sides. The last terrace is wide, made with laterite blocks. It has a cruciform shape and four small pools. A couple more steps lead to the second naga bridge. It has the same shape as the first one, only smaller. In the middle the remains of an eight petalled lotus carving can be seen.

This final terrace leads to the outer gallery. It probably used to be a wooden gallery with a tiled roof, but only a raised floor of laterite remains. After the outer gallery one reaches the inner gallery, which is divided in long and narrow rooms. It served as a wall around the principal tower. This last gallery leads to the third and last naga bridge, another small copy of the first one.

The bridge leads directly into the main sanctuary. After the antechamber and the annex, one reaches the principal tower. Double porches lead out in all directions. The inner sanctum used to have the "linga", the divine symbol of Shiva. Currently, only the "somasutra" remains which was used to drain water during religious rites. The entrances have various lintels and icons depicting Hindu religious stories, e.g., the dancing Shiva and the five yogis. The south entrance is guarded by a sandstone statue.

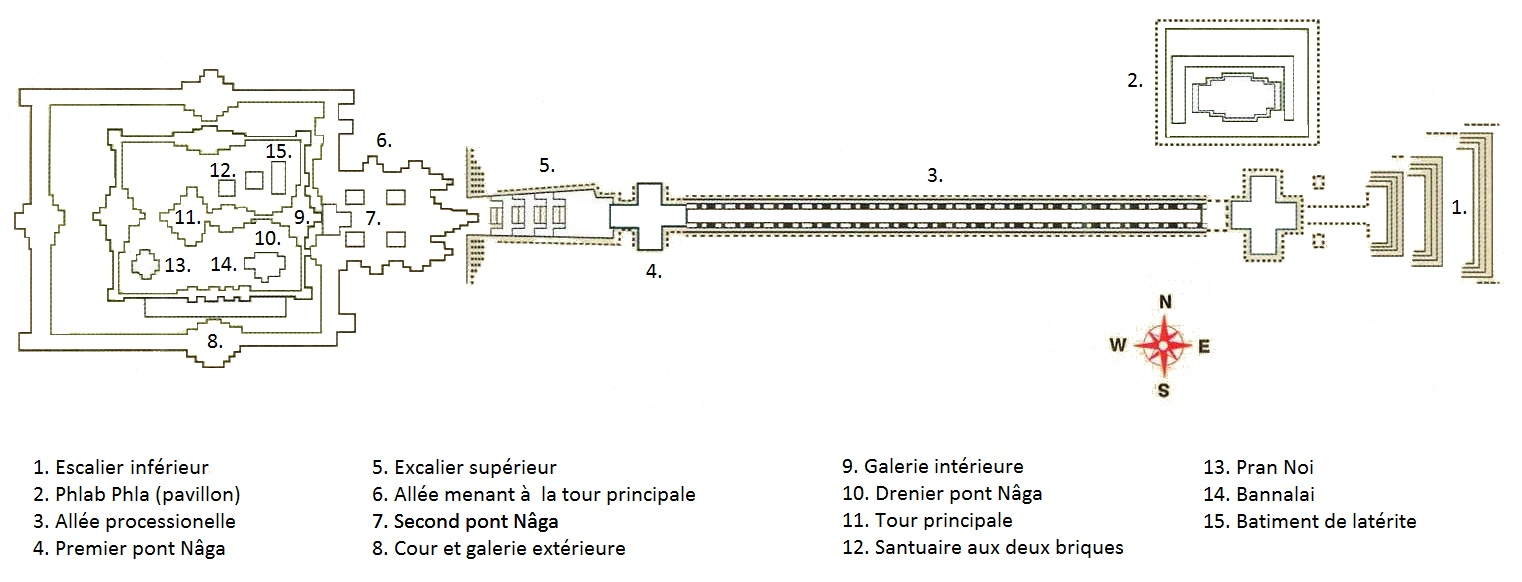
Layout of Phanom Rung temple

Apart from the main tower, other buildings in the compound are:

- Two brick sanctuaries built around the 10th century, northeast of the tower.
- The minor sanctuary southwest of the tower with a sandstone altar for a sacred image. It was built with sandstone in the 11th century. Prang Noi has only one entrance facing east. The sanctuary is square with indented corners, giving it a round feel.
- Two Bannalai southeast and northeast of the principal tower. The buildings are rectangular and have only one entrance. They were built in the last period, around the 13th century, and used as a library for holy scriptures.
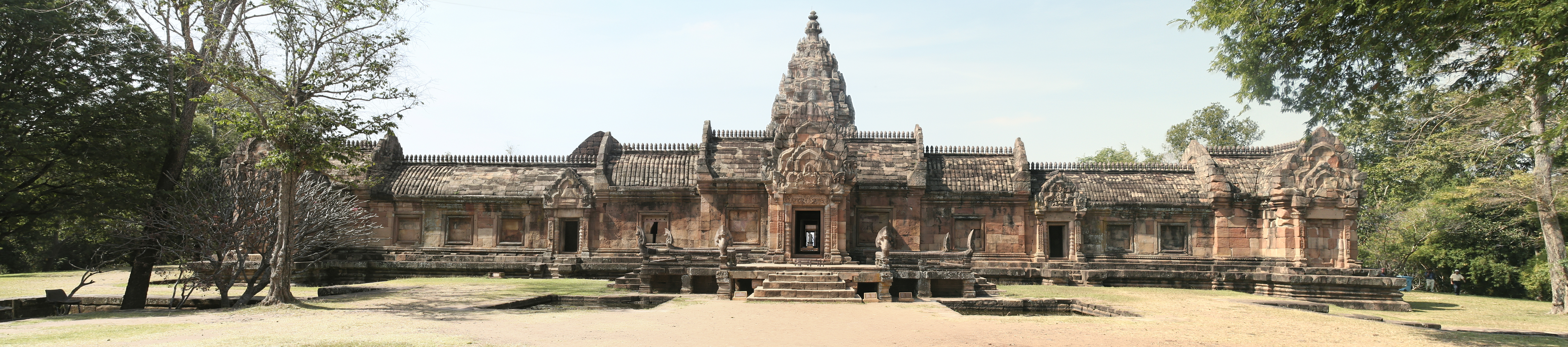
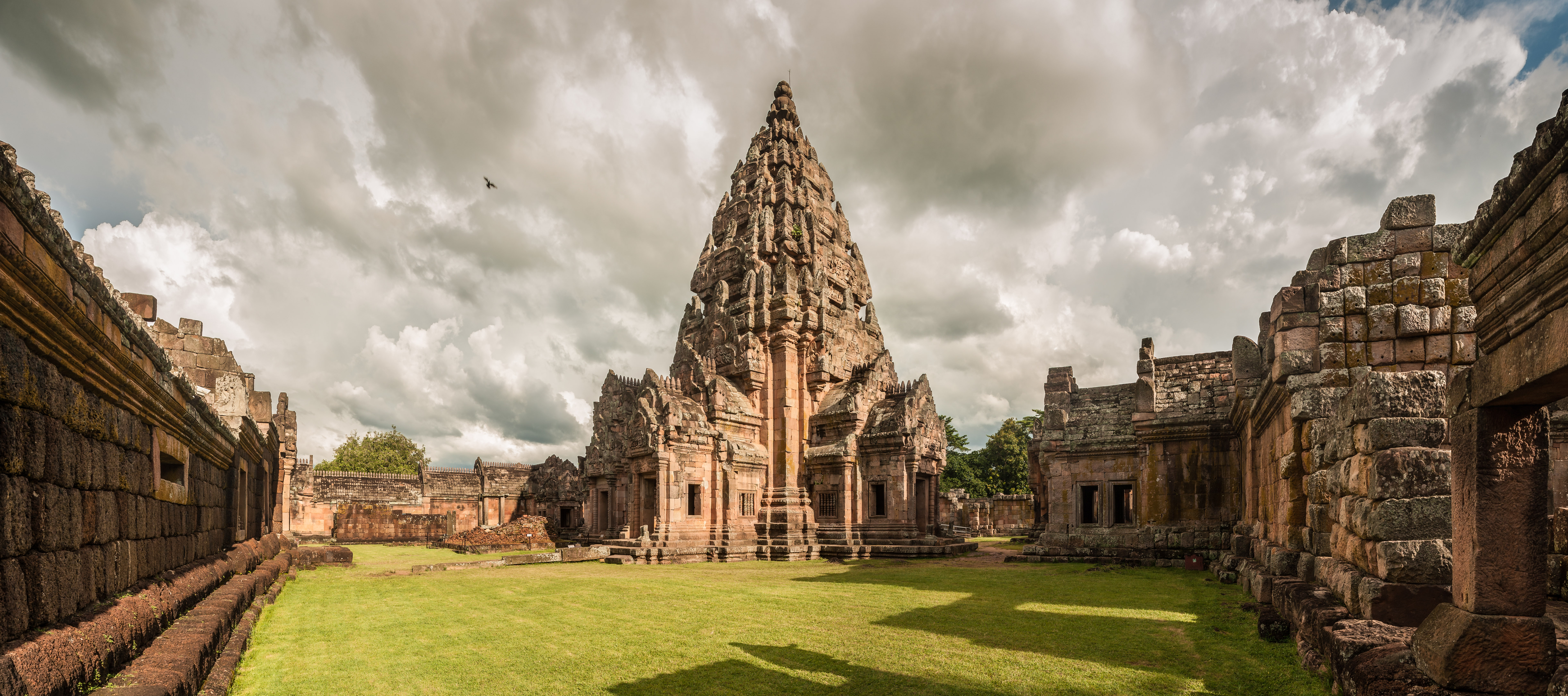
Phanom Rung temple

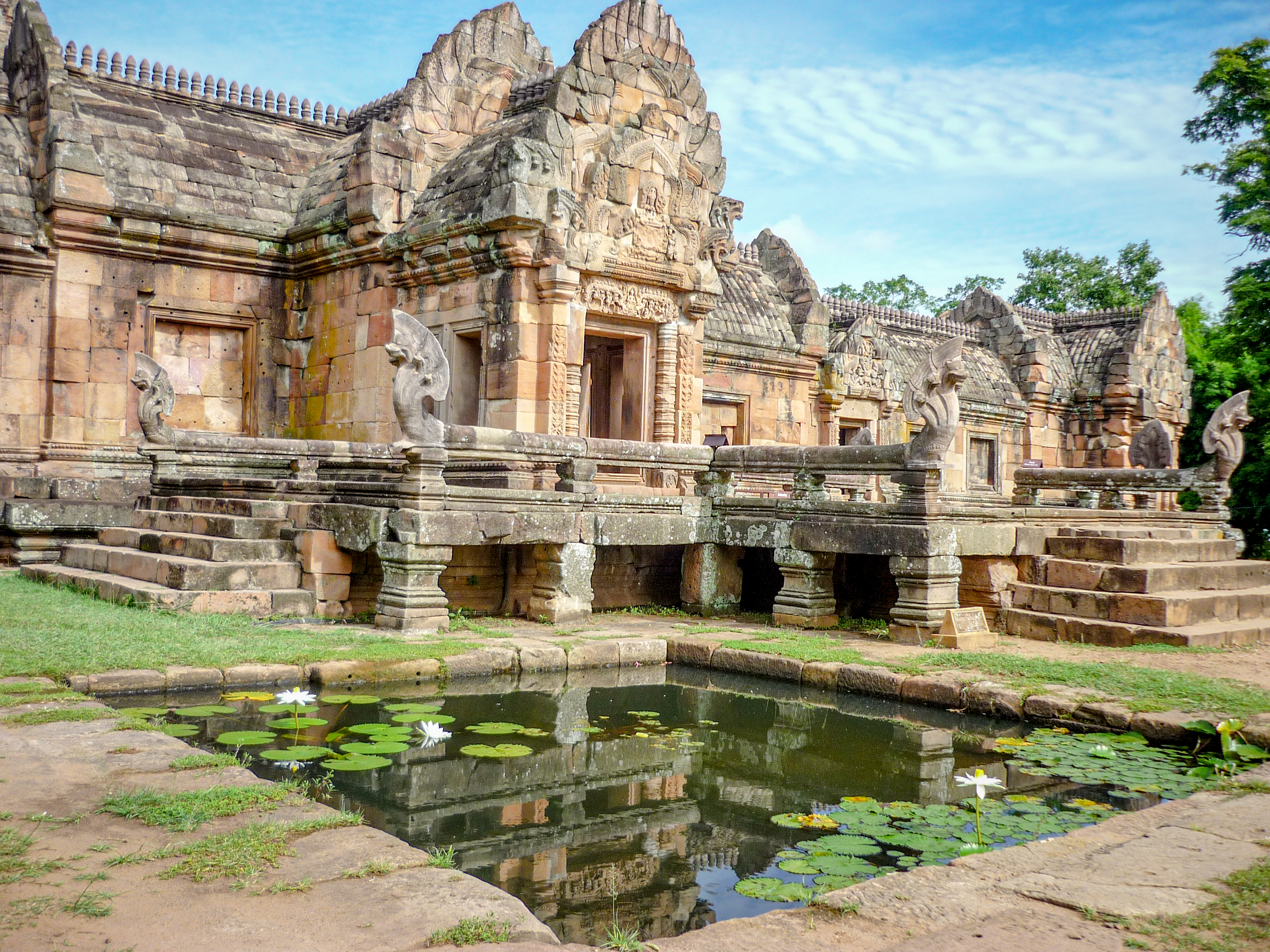
A series of lotus ponds is located in front of the temple

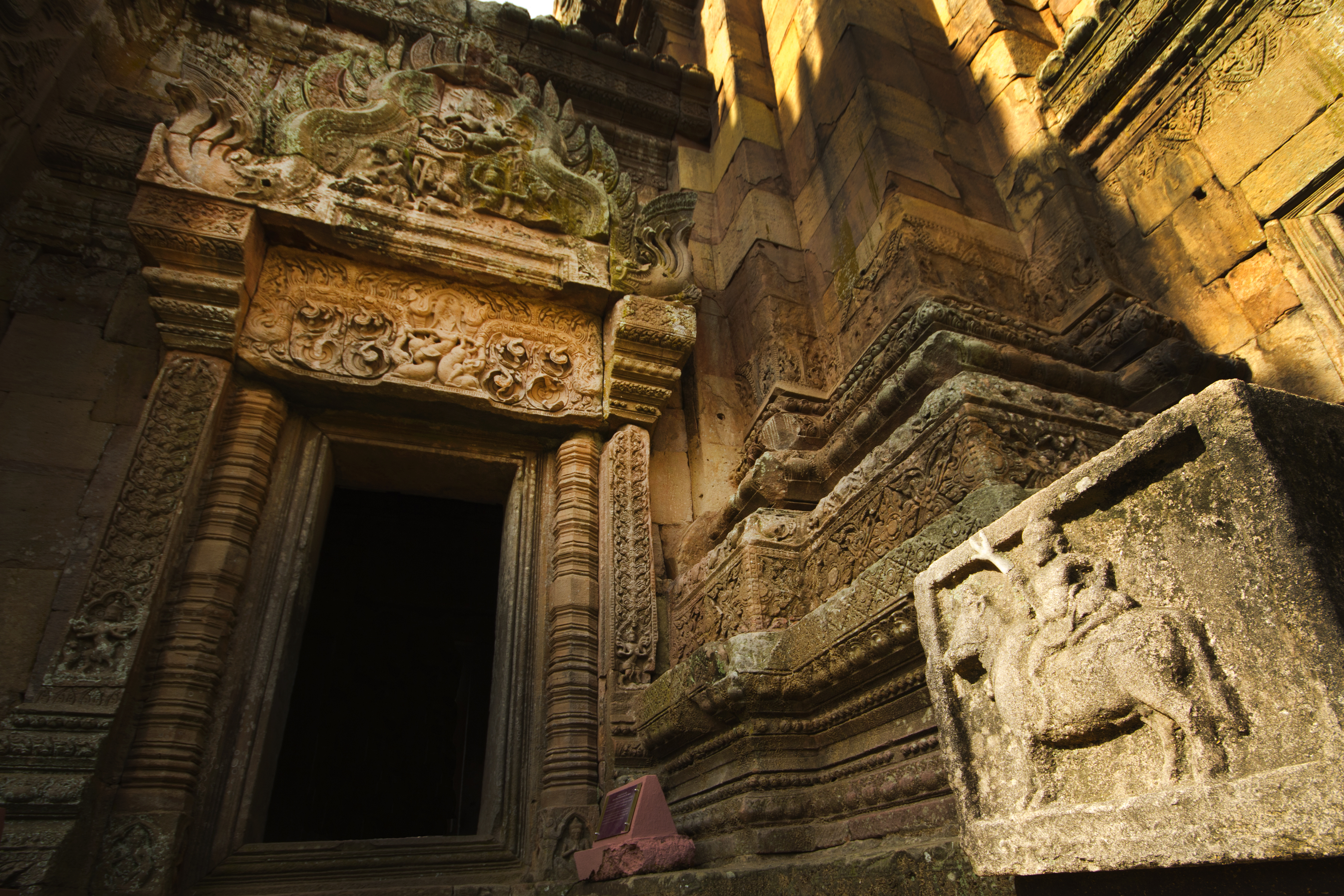
the northern gate of Phanom Rung temple complex

== Phra Narai Lintel ==
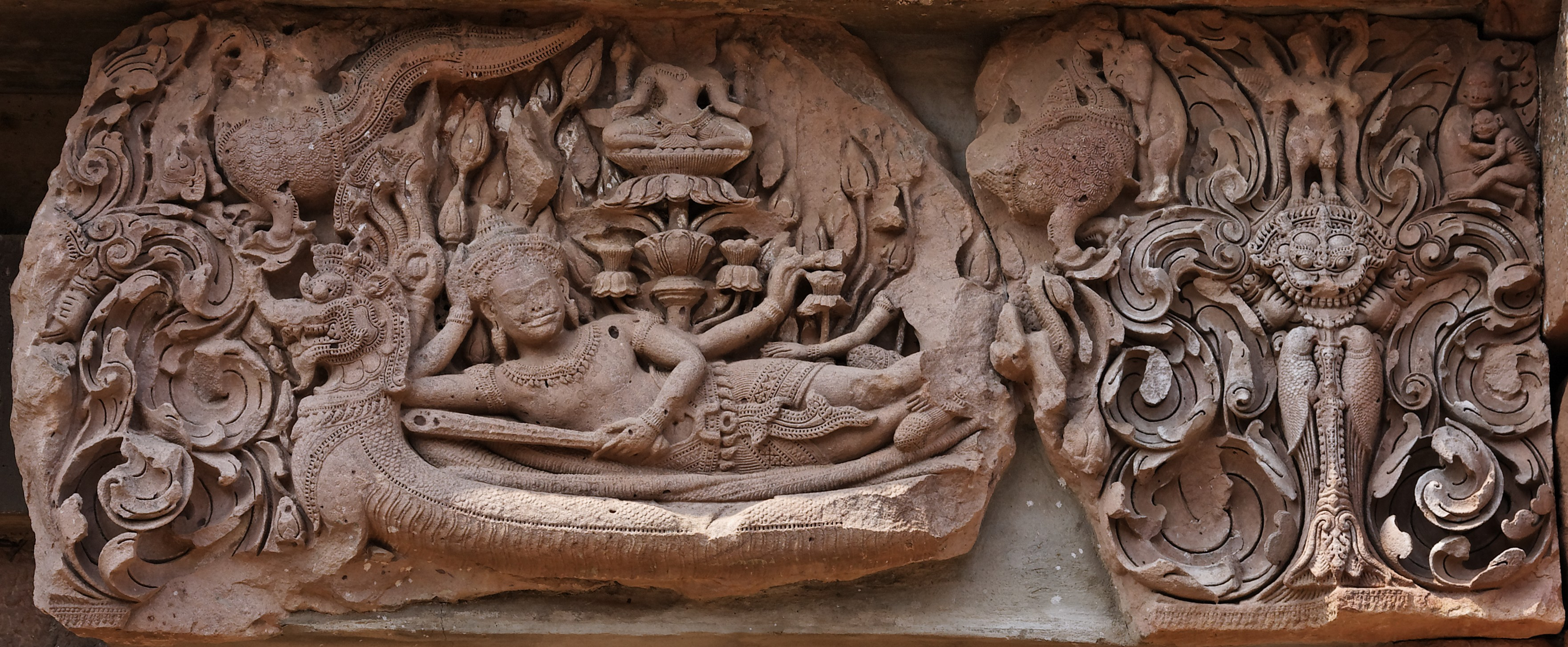
The Phra Narai Lintel

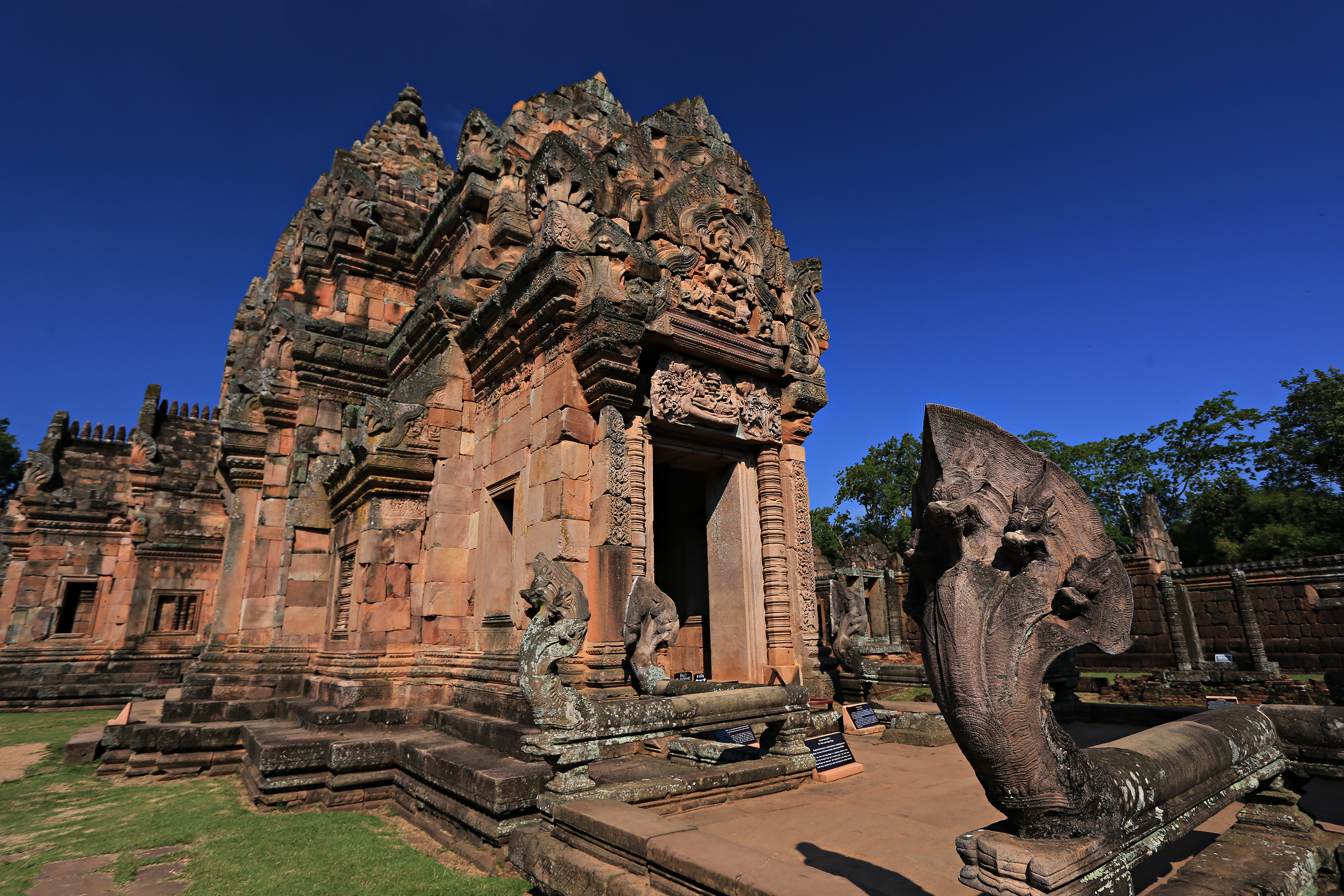
The Thap Lang Narai Banthomsin lintel is set above the temple's entrance, preceded by the Naga balustrade.

One of the most well-known elements of the temple is a decorative lintel placed above the eastern entrance to the central sanctuary. It depicts a reclining Vishnu or Vishnu Anantasayin, and is known in Thai as Thap Lang Narai Banthomsin (ทับหลังนารายณ์บรรทมสินธุ์).

The lintel is best known for its restitution from the Art Institute of Chicago in 1988. It had been stolen from the temple site in the 1960s and was acquired by the museum in 1967, where it was displayed for over twenty years, described as "the Birth of Brahma with Reclining Vishnu on a Makara". In early 1988, as restoration of the temple neared completion, calls were made by several parties in Thailand for its return. The issue became the subject of intense media attention, with some even accusing the US Government of facilitating the theft. The Thai government entered negotiations with the museum, which was unwilling to consider an unconditional return, since it had acquired the item in good faith. Finally, in October, the museum agreed to repatriate the lintel in exchange for a donation from the Chicago-based Elizabeth F. Cheney Foundation. The lintel's arrival in Thailand on 10 November was widely celebrated, and was covered live on the national TV pool. It was restored to its original position on 7 December, marking the completion of the temple's restoration.
