= Districts of Thailand =

Second-level administrative subdivision of Thailand

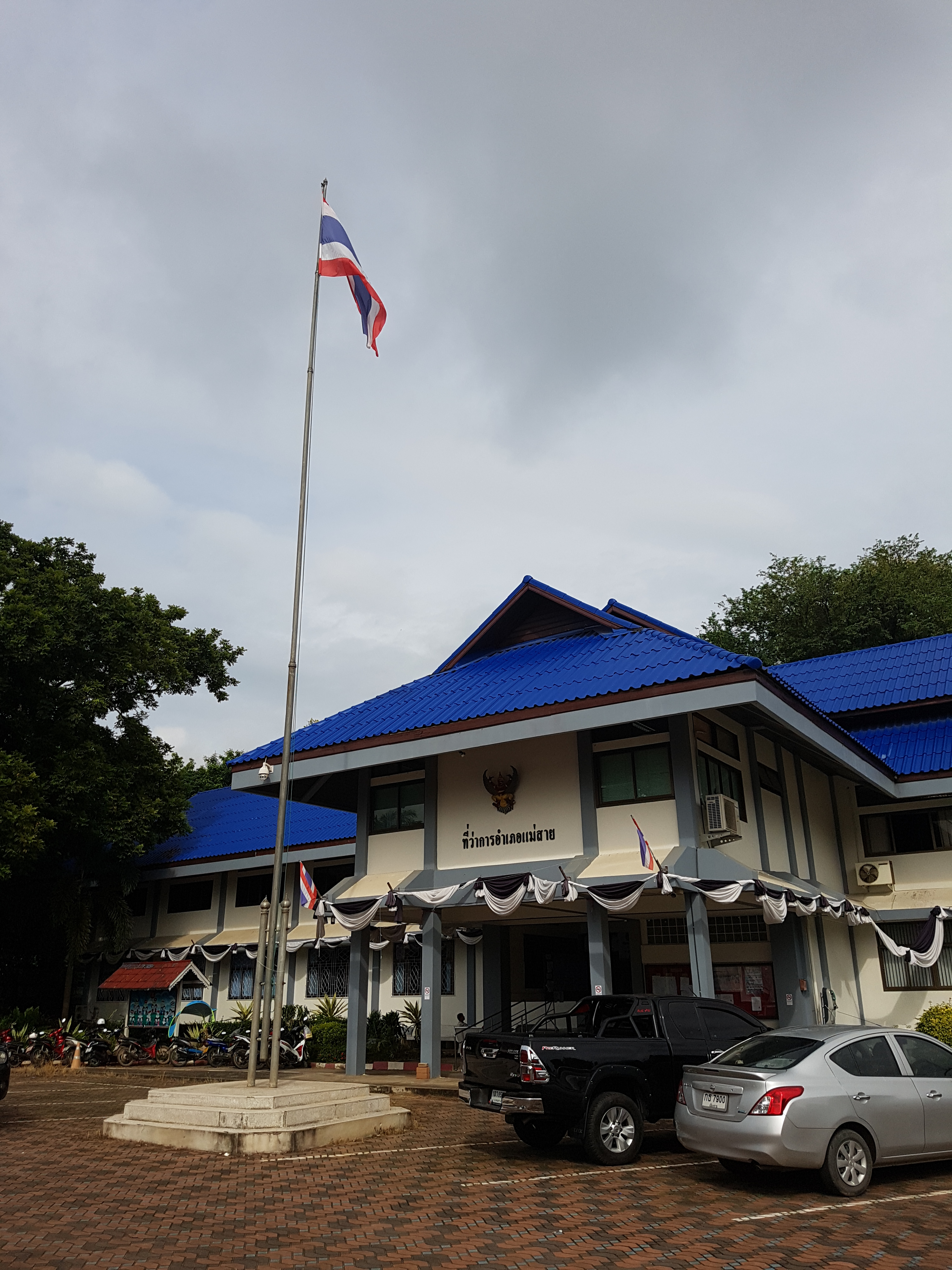
Office of amphoe Mae Sai in Chiang Rai province

An amphoe (Thai: อำเภอ, romanized: amphơ̄, IPA: [ʔāmpʰɤ̄ː]; 'district'), also anglicised as amphur (/ˈæmfɜːr/ or /ˈæmpɜːr/), is the second level administrative subdivision of Thailand. Groups of amphoe or districts make up the provinces, and are analogous to counties. The chief district officer is Nai Amphoe (นายอำเภอ). Amphoe are divided into tambons (Thai: ตำบล; 'subdistricts').

Altogether Thailand has 928 districts, including the 50 districts of Bangkok, which are called khet (เขต) since the Bangkok administrative reform of 1972. The number of districts in provinces varies, from only three in the smallest provinces, up to the 50 urban districts of Bangkok. Also the sizes and population of districts differ greatly. The smallest population is in Ko Kut (Trat province) with just 2,042 citizens, while Mueang Samut Prakan (Samut Prakan province) has 509,262 citizens. The khet of Bangkok have the smallest areas—Khet Samphanthawong is the smallest, with only 1.4 km^{2}—while the amphoe of the sparsely populated mountain regions are bigger than some provinces. Umphang (Tak province) at 4,325.4 km^{2} is the largest and also has the lowest population density. The average area of a district in Thailand is about 552.93 km^{2} (213.49 sq mi), while its average population of a district in Thailand is about 75,345 people.

The names of amphoe are usually unique, but in a few cases different Thai names have the same form in English due to the flaws of the romanization system. The notable exception, however, is the name Amphoe Chaloem Phra Kiat, which was given to five districts created in 1996 in celebration of the 50th anniversary of King Bhumibol Adulyadej's accession to the throne. Chaloem Phra Kiat (เฉลิมพระเกียรติ) means 'in commemoration of' or 'in honour of' a royal family member.

== Local administration ==
Each district is led by a district chief officer (nai amphoe, นายอำเภอ), who is appointed by the Ministry of Interior. The officer is a subordinate of the provincial governor.

== Amphoe mueang ==
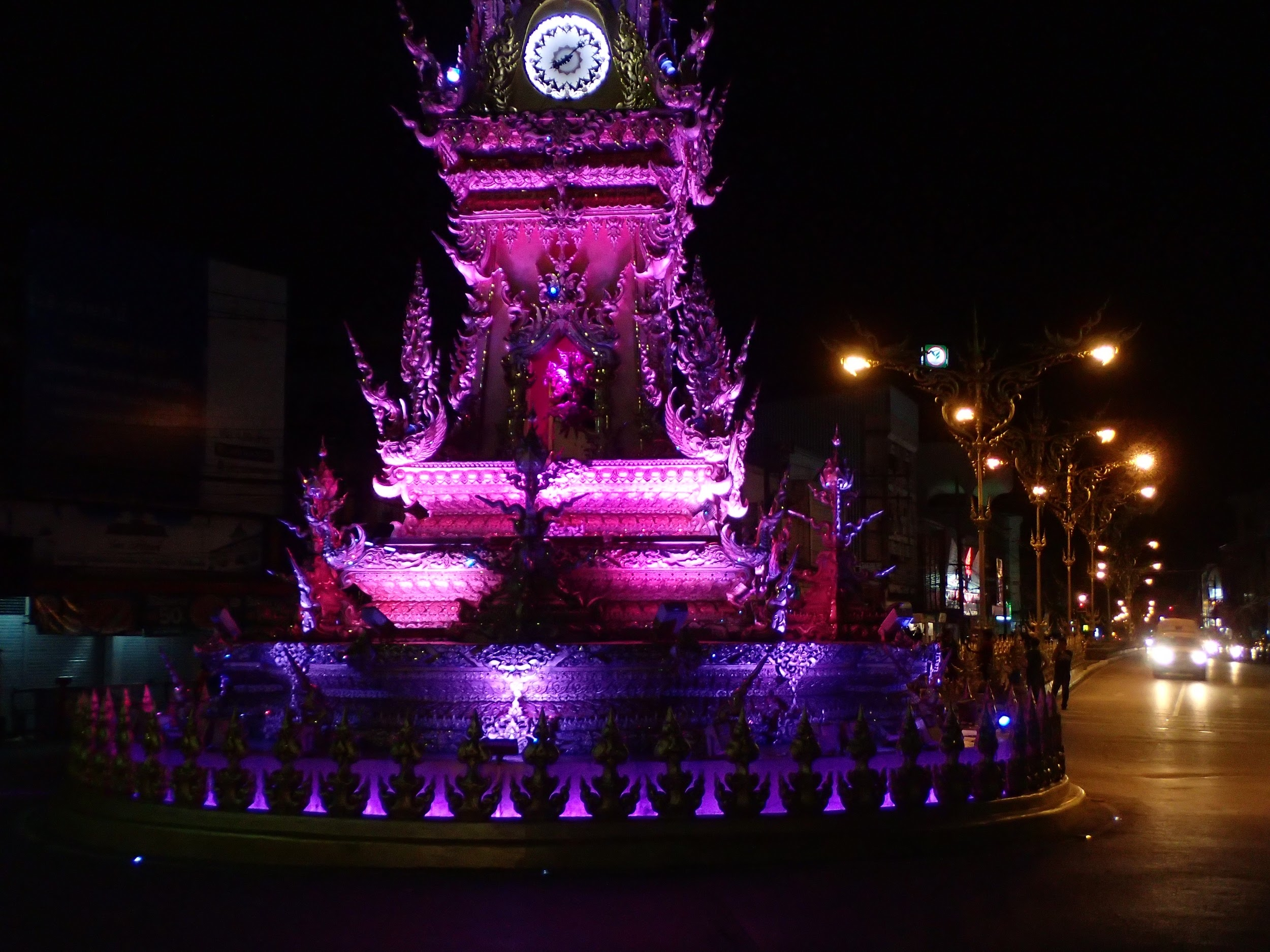
The Mueang Chiang Rai city clock tower in the centre of amphoe meaung Chiang Rai

The district which contains the administrative office of the province is the amphoe mueang (lit. town district). The district is not to be confused with the capital town itself, which is a different administrative entity usually much smaller than the district. Until the 1930s, most of the capital districts had names just like other districts, whereas districts dating back to old provinces had the word mueang in their name. In 1938 all the capital districts were renamed amphoe mueang, whereas in all non-capital districts mueang was removed from the name. The notable exception to this rule is Ayutthaya, where the capital district is named Amphoe Phra Nakhon Si Ayutthaya (instead of Amphoe Mueang Ayutthaya), the same as the province, which is fully named Phra Nakhon Si Ayutthaya. Also the capital districts of Thonburi and Phra Nakhon Provinces had the same name as the province, which they kept when the two provinces were merged to form Bangkok metropolis.

In most cases the capital district is also the most populous district of the province, as the provincial administration is usually in the largest town of the province. Songkhla province is the most striking exception, as the town (and thus also the district) Hat Yai grew much faster than the capital Mueang Songkhla due to its better transport connections.

There are four districts in Thailand (Chan, Pan, Suang, and Yang) which contain the term mueang in their name as well, even though they are not capital districts. All of these were created relatively recently, between 1973 and 1995.

== King amphoe ==
Minor districts (king amphoe, กิ่งอำเภอ — กิ่ง literally 'branch') are set up when the administration of areas remote from the district center is inconvenient for citizens. Most of the tasks of the amphoe are transferred to the king amphoe, but it is still partially a subordinate of the amphoe it was created from. When the king amphoe meets the necessary qualifications to become an amphoe, it is usually promoted. However, not every newly created amphoe begins as a king amphoe: if the qualifications are met directly, this phase is skipped. While usually a minor district is upgraded after a few years, in some cases it remains a minor district for decades. For example, Ko Yao was a minor district for 85 years until it was upgraded in 1988. Sometimes a district is downgraded to a minor district. Thung Wa lost a lot of its population to neighboring La-ngu minor district, so finally La-ngu was upgraded and Thung Wa downgraded. Another example is Chumphon Buri, which was reduced after the more developed part was split off to form a new district and the remaining district was downgraded.

The criteria required for an amphoe are a population of at least 30,000 people and at least five tambon, or, if the area is more than 25 km (16 mi) from the district office, a population of at least 15,000 and four tambon.

A minor district is led by a chief officer (Hua Na King Amphoe, หัวหน้ากิ่งอำเภอ).

The Thai word king (กิ่ง) means 'branch' and should not be confused with the English word "king". The officially recommended translation is "minor district" —however they are also quite commonly translated as sub-district, which is the recommended translation for tambon, and also wrongly suggests that they are at a lower administrative level than the amphoe.

The Thai government upgraded all remaining 81 minor districts to full districts on 15 May 2007 in order to streamline administration. With publication in the Royal Gazette on 24 August the order became official.

== District office ==
The administration of the district is housed in an office building called thi wa kan amphoe (ที่ว่าการอำเภอ), which also marks the center of each district. Distances on road signs are always calculated to this office building. The office is usually in the largest settlement of the district, to make it easily accessible to the majority of the population —one of the tasks of the amphoe is the civil registry, which makes the district the most important of the administrative levels for the Thai public.

== List of amphoe ==
Rank	Name	Population (Census 2000)	Name	Area (km^{2})	Name	Pop. Density Pop./km^{2}
1.	Mueang Samut Prakan	435,122	Umphang	4325.4	Pom Prap Sattru Phai	45,187.9
2.	Mueang Nakhon Ratchasima	430,053	Thong Pha Phum	3655.2	Samphanthawong	30,182.1
3.	Mueang Udon Thani	379,851	Ban Rai	3621.5	Thon Buri	24,494.5
4.	Mueang Khon Kaen	359,065	Mae Chaem	3361.2	Din Daeng	22,180.8
5.	Mueang Nonthaburi	332,388	Sangkhla Buri	3349.4	Khlong San	20,844.6
...
922.	Chaloem Phra Kiat	7,517	Khlong San	6.1	Nong Ya Plong	10.0
923.	Don Phut	6,957	Phra Nakhon	5.5	Kaeng Krachan	9.8
924.	Ko Sichang	4,417	Bang Rak	5.5	Sangkhla Buri	8.7
925.	Ko Chang	4,399	Pom Prap Sattru Phai	1.9	Si Sawat	6.1
926.	Ko Kut	2,042	Samphanthawong	1.4	Umphang	5.1

== See also ==
- Administrative divisions of Thailand
