= List of municipalities in Nakhon Ratchasima province =

This is a list of municipalities in Nakhon Ratchasima province, a province of Thailand. There are one city (Nakhon Ratchasima), four towns, and 70 townships.

== Cities ==
Nr.	City	Thai	Amphoe	Area (km²)	Population	Pop. density
1.	City of Nakhon Ratchasima	เทศบาลนครนครราชสีมา	Mueang Nakhon Ratchasima	37.5	166,615	4,443

== Towns ==
Nr.	Town	Thai	Amphoe	Area (km²)	Population	Pop. density
1.	Town of Bua Yai	เทศบาลเมืองบัวใหญ่	Bua Yai	10.626	12,578	1,183
2.	Town of Pak Chong	เทศบาลเมืองปากช่อง	Pak Chong	15.25	36,121	2,368
3.	Town of Sikhio	เทศบาลเมืองสีคิ้ว	Sikhio	11.63	18,259	1,569
4.	Town of Mueang Pak	เทศบาลเมืองเมืองปัก	Pak Thong Chai	12.41	14,448	1,164.22

== Townships ==
Nr.	Township	Thai	Amphoe	Area (km²)	Population	Pop. density
1.	Township of Khok Kruat	เทศบาลตำบลโคกกรวด	Mueang Nakhon Ratchasima	3.00	166,615	4,443
2.	Township of Khok Sung	เทศบาลตำบลโคกสูง	Mueang Nakhon Ratchasima	30.46	9,235	
3.	Township of Cho Ho	เทศบาลตำบลจอหอ	Mueang Nakhon Ratchasima	37.5	166,615	4,443
3.	Township of Chai Mongkhon	เทศบาลตำบลไชยมงคล	Mueang Nakhon Ratchasima	37.5	166,615	4,443
3.	Township of Mueang Mai Khok Kruat	เทศบาลตำบลเมืองใหม่โคกกรวด	Mueang Nakhon Ratchasima	37.5	166,615	4,443
4.	Township of Ban Pho	เทศบาลตำบลบ้านโพธิ์	Mueang Nakhon Ratchasima	16.63	8,931	
4.	Township of Ban Mai	เทศบาลตำบลบ้านใหม่	Mueang Nakhon Ratchasima	16.63	8,931	
4.	Township of Pru Yai	เทศบาลตำบลปรุใหญ่	Mueang Nakhon Ratchasima	16.63	8,931	
5.	Township of Phut Sa	เทศบาลตำบลพุดซา	Mueang Nakhon Ratchasima	37.5	166,615	4,443
5.	Township of Pho Klang	เทศบาลตำบลโพธิ์กลาง	Mueang Nakhon Ratchasima	37.5	166,615	4,443
6.	Township of Nong Khai Nam	เทศบาลตำบลหนองไข่น้ำ	Mueang Nakhon Ratchasima	43.44	5,792	
7.	Township of Nong Phai Lom	เทศบาลตำบลหนองไผ่ล้อม	Mueang Nakhon Ratchasima	37.5	166,615	4,443
8.	Township of Hua Thale	เทศบาลตำบลหัวทะเล	Mueang Nakhon Ratchasima	37.5	166,615	4,443
8.	Township of Suranari	เทศบาลตำบลสุรนารี	Mueang Nakhon Ratchasima	37.5	166,615	4,443
9.	Township of Klang Dong	เทศบาลตำบลกลางดง	Pak Chong	15.25	40,185	2,635.34
10.	Township of Sima Mongkhon	เทศบาลตำบลสีมามงคล	Pak Chong	15.25	40,185	2,635.34
11.	Township of Mu Si	เทศบาลตำบลหมูสี	Pak Chong	15.25	40,185	2,635.34
12.	Township of Wang Sai	เทศบาลตำบลวังไทร	Pak Chong	134.34	11,197	
13.	Township of Khlong Phai	เทศบาลตำบลคลองไผ่	Sikhio	11.63		
14.	Township of Lat Bua Khao	เทศบาลตำบลลาดบัวขาว	Sikhio	11.63		
15.	Township of Nong Nam Sai	เทศบาลตำบลหนองน้ำใส	Sikhio	101	12,443	
17.	Township of Pak Thong Chai	เทศบาลตำบลปักธงชัย	Pak Thong Chai	17.92	4,304	
18.	Township of Takhop	เทศบาลตำบลตะขบ	Pak Thong Chai	11.63		
19.	Township of Nok Ok	เทศบาลตำบลนกออก	Pak Thong Chai	60	6,083	
20.	Township of Bo Pla Thong	เทศบาลตำบลบ่อปลาทอง	Pak Thong Chai	49	3,511	
21.	Township of Lam Nang Kaeo	เทศบาลตำบลลำนางแก้ว	Pak Thong Chai	11.63		
22.	Township of Phimai	เทศบาลตำบลพิมาย	Phimai	11.63		
23.	Township of Rang Ka Yai	เทศบาลตำบลรังกาใหญ่	Phimai	11.63		
24.	Township of Non Sung	เทศบาลตำบลโนนสูง	Non Sung	11.63		
25.	Township of Don Wai	เทศบาลตำบลดอนหวาย	Non Sung	20.49	3,440	
26.	Township of Talat Khae	เทศบาลตำบลตลาดแค	Non Sung	11.63		
27.	Township of Makha	เทศบาลตำบลมะค่า	Non Sung	11.63		
28.	Township of Dan Khla	เทศบาลตำบลด่านคล้า	Non Sung	29	8,567	
29.	Township of Mai	เทศบาลตำบลใหม่	Non Sung	66.46	12,772	
30.	Township of Ho Kham	เทศบาลตำบลหอคำ	Non Sung	40.04	6,930	
31.	Township of Chok Chai	เทศบาลตำบลโชคชัย	Chok Chai	11.63		
32.	Township of Dan Kwian	เทศบาลตำบลด่านเกวียน	Chok Chai	11.63		
33.	Township of Tha Yiam	เทศบาลตำบลท่าเยี่ยม	Chok Chai	11.63		
34.	Township of Dan Khun Thot	เทศบาลตำบลด่านขุนทด	Dan Khun Thot	11.63		
35.	Township of Nong Krat	เทศบาลตำบลหนองกราด	Dan Khun Thot	11.63		
36.	Township of Nong Bua Takiat	เทศบาลตำบลหนองบัวตะเกียด	Dan Khun Thot	11.63		
37.	Township of Nong Bua Lakhon	เทศบาลตำบลหนองบัวละคร	Dan Khun Thot	11.63		
38.	Township of Sai Yong-Chaiyawan	เทศบาลตำบลไทรโยง-ไชยวาล	Khon Buri	11.63		
39.	Township of Chorakhe Hin	เทศบาลตำบลจระเข้หิน	Khon Buri	11.63		
40.	Township of Chae	เทศบาลตำบลแชะ	Khon Buri	11.63		
41.	Township of Khon Buri Tai	เทศบาลตำบลครบุรีใต้	Khon Buri	11.63		
42.	Township of Oraphim	เทศบาลตำบลอรพิมพ์	Khon Buri	11.63		
43.	Township of Sung Noen	เทศบาลตำบลสูงเนิน	Sung Noen	11.63		
44.	Township of Khut Chik	เทศบาลตำบลกุดจิก	Sung Noen	11.63		
45.	Township of Kham Thale So	เทศบาลตำบลขามทะเลสอ	Kham Thale So	11.63		
46.	Township of Kham Sakae Saeng	เทศบาลตำบลขามสะแกแสง	Kham Sakae Saeng	11.63		
47.	Township of Nong Hua Fan	เทศบาลตำบลหนองหัวฟาน	Kham Sakae Saeng	11.63		
48.	Township of Khong	เทศบาลตำบลเมืองคง	Khong	11.63		
49.	Township of Thephalai	เทศบาลตำบลเทพาลัย	Khong	11.63		
50.	Township of Non Thai	เทศบาลตำบลโนนไทย	Non Thai	11.63		
51.	Township of Khok Sawai	เทศบาลตำบลโคกสวาย	Non Thai	11.63		
52.	Township of Banlang	เทศบาลตำบลบัลลังก์	Non Thai	11.63		
53.	Township of Huai Thalaeng	เทศบาลตำบลห้วยแถลง	Huai Thalaeng	11.63		
54.	Township of Hin Dat	เทศบาลตำบลหินดาด	Huai Thalaeng	11.63		
55.	Township of Soeng Sang	เทศบาลตำบลเสิงสาง	Soeng Sang	11.63		
56.	Township of Non Sombun	เทศบาลตำบลโนนสมบูรณ์	Soeng Sang	11.63		
57.	Township of Ban Lueam	เทศบาลตำบลบ้านเหลื่อม	Ban Lueam	11.63		
58.	Township of Chakkarat	เทศบาลตำบลจักราช	Chakkarat	11.63		
59.	Township of Tha Chang	เทศบาลตำบลท่าช้าง	Chaloem Phra Kiat	11.63		
60.	Township of Chum Phuang	เทศบาลตำบลชุมพวง	Chum Phuang	11.63		
61.	Township of Non Daeng	เทศบาลตำบลโนนแดง	Non Daeng	11.63		
62.	Township of Nong Bua Lai	เทศบาลตำบลหนองบัวลาย	Bua Lai	11.63		
63.	Township of Prathai	เทศบาลตำบลประทาย	Prathai	11.63		
64.	Township of Phra Thong Kham	เทศบาลตำบลพระทองคำ	Phra Thong Kham	11.63		
65.	Township of Mueang Yang	เทศบาลตำบลเมืองยาง	Mueang Yang	68.54	8,363	
66.	Township of Nong Bua Wong	เทศบาลตำบลหนองบัววง	Lam Thamenchai	11.63		
67.	Township of San Chao Pho	เทศบาลตำบลศาลเจ้าพ่อ	Wang Nam Khiao	11.63		
68.	Township of Sida	เทศบาลตำบลสีดา	Sida	11.63		
69.	Township of Nong Hua Raet	เทศบาลตำบลหนองหัวแรต	Nong Bun Mak	93.99	8,265	
70.	Township of Laem Thong	เทศบาลตำบลแหลมทอง	Nong Bun Mak	69.22	5,667	
