= List of tambon in Thailand (D) =

This is a list of tambon (sub-districts) in Thailand, beginning with the letter D. This information is liable to change due to border changes or re-allocation of Tambons. Missing Tambon numbers show where the number is either not used or the Tambon has been transferred to a different Amphoe.

Tambon	ตำบล	Amphoe	อำเภอ	Changwat (Province)	จังหวัด	Region
Daen Chumphon	แดนชุมพล	Song	สอง	Phrae	แพร่	North
Daen Sa-nguan	แดนสงวน	Ranot (Malay: Renut)	ระโนด	Songkhla	สงขลา	South
Daeng Mo	แดงหม้อ	Khueang Nai	เขื่องใน	Ubon Ratchathani	อุบลราชธานี	North-East
Daeng Yai	แดงใหญ่	Mueang Khon Kaen	เมืองขอนแก่น	Khon Kaen	ขอนแก่น	North-East
Daeng Yai	แดงใหญ่	Ban Mai Chaiyaphot	บ้านใหม่ไชยพจน์	Buriram	บุรีรัมย์	North-East
Damnoen Saduak	ดำเนินสะดวก	Damnoen Saduak	ดำเนินสะดวก	Ratchaburi	ราชบุรี	West
Dan	ด่าน	Rasi Salai	ราษีไศล	Sisaket	ศรีสะเกษ	North-East
Dan Chak	ด่านจาก	Non Thai	โนนไทย	Nakhon Ratchasima	นครราชสีมา	North-East
Dan Chang	ด่านช้าง	Bua Yai	บัวใหญ่	Nakhon Ratchasima	นครราชสีมา	North-East
Dan Chang	ด่านช้าง	Na Klang	นากลาง	Nong Bua Lamphu	หนองบัวลำภู	North-East
Dan Chang	ด่านช้าง	Dan Chang	ด่านช้าง	Suphan Buri	สุพรรณบุรี	Central
Dan Chang	ด่านช้าง	Banphot Phisai	บรรพตพิสัย	Nakhon Sawan	นครสวรรค์	Central
Dan Chumphon	ด่านชุมพล	Bo Rai	บ่อไร่	Trat	ตราด	East
Dan Khla	ด่านคล้า	Non Sung	โนนสูง	Nakhon Ratchasima	นครราชสีมา	North-East
Dan Khun Thot	ด่านขุนทด	Dan Khun Thot	ด่านขุนทด	Nakhon Ratchasima	นครราชสีมา	North-East
Dan Kwian	ด่านเกวียน	Chok Chai	โชคชัย	Nakhon Ratchasima	นครราชสีมา	North-East
Dan Mae Chalaep	ด่านแม่แฉลบ	Si Sawat	ศรีสวัสดิ์	Kanchanaburi	กาญจนบุรี	West
Dan Mae Kham Man	ด่านแม่คำมัน	Laplae	ลับแล	Uttaradit	อุตรดิตถ์	North
Dan Mae La Mao	ด่านแม่ละเมา	Mae Sot	แม่สอด	Tak	ตาก	West
Dan Makham Tia	ด่านมะขามเตี้ย	Dan Makham Tia	ด่านมะขามเตี้ย	Kanchanaburi	กาญจนบุรี	West
Dan Muang Kham	ด่านม่วงคำ	Khok Si Suphan	โคกศรีสุพรรณ	Sakon Nakhon	สกลนคร	North-East
Dan Nai	ด่านใน	Dan Khun Thot	ด่านขุนทด	Nakhon Ratchasima	นครราชสีมา	North-East
Dan Nok	ด่านนอก	Dan Khun Thot	ด่านขุนทด	Nakhon Ratchasima	นครราชสีมา	North-East
Dan Sai	ด่านซ้าย	Dan Sai	ด่านซ้าย	Loei	เลย	North-East
Dan Sawi	ด่านสวี	Sawi	สวี	Chumphon	ชุมพร	South
Dan Si Suk	ด่านศรีสุข	Pho Tak	โพธิ์ตาก	Nong Khai	หนองคาย	North-East
Dan Thap Tako	ด่านทับตะโก	Chom Bueng	จอมบึง	Ratchaburi	ราชบุรี	West
Dao Khanong	ดาวคะนอง	Khet Thon Buri	ธนบุรี	Bangkok	กรุงเทพมหานคร	Central
Dao Rueang	ดาวเรือง	Mueang Saraburi	เมืองสระบุรี	Saraburi	สระบุรี	Central
Dato	ดาโต๊ะ	Nong Chik	หนองจิก	Pattani	ปัตตานี	South
Den Chai	เด่นชัย	Den Chai	เด่นชัย	Phrae	แพร่	North
Den Lek	เด่นเหล็ก	Nam Pat	น้ำปาด	Uttaradit	อุตรดิตถ์	North
Den Rat	เด่นราษฎร์	Nong Hi	หนองฮี	Roi Et	ร้อยเอ็ด	North-East
Den Yai	เด่นใหญ่	Hankha	หันคา	Chai Nat	ชัยนาท	Central
Di Lang	ดีลัง	Phatthana Nikhom	พัฒนานิคม	Lopburi	ลพบุรี	Central
Di Luang	ดีหลวง	Sathing Phra	สทิงพระ	Songkhla	สงขลา	South
Din Chi	ดินจี่	Kham Muang	คำม่วง	Kalasin	กาฬสินธุ์	North-East
Din Daeng	ดินแดง	Khet Din Daeng	ดินแดง	Bangkok	กรุงเทพมหานคร	Central
Din Daeng	ดินแดง	Phrai Bueng	ไพรบึง	Sisaket	ศรีสะเกษ	North-East
Din Daeng	ดินแดง	Lam Thap	ลำทับ	Krabi	กระบี่	South
Din Dam	ดินดำ	Changhan	จังหาร	Roi Et	ร้อยเอ็ด	North-East
Din Dam	ดินดำ	Phu Wiang	ภูเวียง	Khon Kaen	ขอนแก่น	North-East
Din Thong	ดินทอง	Wang Thong	วังทอง	Phitsanulok	พิษณุโลก	Central
Din Udom	ดินอุดม	Lam Thap	ลำทับ	Krabi	กระบี่	South
Doem Bang	เดิมบาง	Doem Bang Nang Buat	เดิมบางนางบวช	Suphan Buri	สุพรรณบุรี	Central
Doi Hang	ดอยฮาง	Mueang Chiang Rai	เมืองเชียงราย	Chiang Rai	เชียงราย	North
Doi Kaeo	ดอยแก้ว	Chom Thong	จอมทอง	Chiang Mai	เชียงใหม่	North
Doi Lan	ดอยลาน	Mueang Chiang Rai	เมืองเชียงราย	Chiang Rai	เชียงราย	North
Doi Lo	ดอยหล่อ	Doi Lo	ดอยหล่อ	Chiang Mai	เชียงใหม่	North
Doi Ngam	ดอยงาม	Phan	พาน	Chiang Rai	เชียงราย	North
Doi Tao	ดอยเต่า	Doi Tao	ดอยเต่า	Chiang Mai	เชียงใหม่	North
Dok Khamtai	ดอกคำใต้	Dok Khamtai	ดอกคำใต้	Phayao	พะเยา	North
Dok Lam	ดอกล้ำ	Pathum Rat	ปทุมรัตต์	Roi Et	ร้อยเอ็ด	North-East
Dok Mai	ดอกไม้	Suwannaphum	สุวรรณภูมิ	Roi Et	ร้อยเอ็ด	North-East
Dokmai	ดอกไม้	Prawet	ประเวศ	Bangkok	กรุงเทพมหานคร	Central
Dom Pradit	โดมประดิษฐ์	Nam Yuen	น้ำยืน	Ubon Ratchathani	อุบลราชธานี	North-East
Dom	ดม	Sangkha	สังขะ	Surin	สุรินทร์	North-East
Don	ดอน	Panare (Malay: Penarik)	ปะนาเระ	Pattani	ปัตตานี	South
Don	ดอน	Pak Thong Chai	ปักธงชัย	Nakhon Ratchasima	นครราชสีมา	North-East
Don Arang	ดอนอะราง	Nong Ki	หนองกี่	Buriram	บุรีรัมย์	North-East
Don Cha-em	ดอนชะเอม	Tha Maka	ท่ามะกา	Kanchanaburi	กาญจนบุรี	West
Don Chan	ดอนจาน	Don Chan	ดอนจาน	Kalasin	กาฬสินธุ์	North-East
Don Chang	ดอนช้าง	Mueang Khon Kaen	เมืองขอนแก่น	Khon Kaen	ขอนแก่น	North-East
Don Chedi	ดอนเจดีย์	Don Chedi	ดอนเจดีย์	Suphan Buri	สุพรรณบุรี	Central
Don Chedi	ดอนเจดีย์	Phanom Thuan	พนมทวน	Kanchanaburi	กาญจนบุรี	West
Don Chik	ดอนจิก	Phibun Mangsahan	พิบูลมังสาหาร	Ubon Ratchathani	อุบลราชธานี	North-East
Don Chimphli	ดอนฉิมพลี	Bang Nam Priao	บางน้ำเปรี้ยว	Chachoengsao	ฉะเชิงเทรา	East
Don Chomphu	ดอนชมพู	Non Sung	โนนสูง	Nakhon Ratchasima	นครราชสีมา	North-East
Don Dang	ดอนดั่ง	Nong Song Hong	หนองสองห้อง	Khon Kaen	ขอนแก่น	North-East
Don Du	ดอนดู่	Nong Song Hong	หนองสองห้อง	Khon Kaen	ขอนแก่น	North-East
Don Dueng	ดอนดึง	Ban Mi	บ้านหมี่	Lopburi	ลพบุรี	Central
Don Faek	ดอนแฝก	Nakhon Chai Si	นครชัยศรี	Nakhon Pathom	นครปฐม	Central
Don Fai	ดอนไฟ	Mae Tha	แม่ทะ	Lampang	ลำปาง	North
Don Hai Sok	ดอนหายโศก	Nong Han	หนองหาน	Udon Thani	อุดรธานี	North-East
Don Han	ดอนหัน	Mueang Khon Kaen	เมืองขอนแก่น	Khon Kaen	ขอนแก่น	North-East
Don Hua Lo	ดอนหัวฬ่อ	Mueang Chonburi	เมืองชลบุรี	Chonburi	ชลบุรี	East
Don Kaeo	ดอนแก้ว	Saraphi	สารภี	Chiang Mai	เชียงใหม่	North
Don Kaeo	ดอนแก้ว	Mae Rim	แม่ริม	Chiang Mai	เชียงใหม่	North
Don Kai Di	ดอนไก่ดี	Krathum Baen	กระทุ่มแบน	Samut Sakhon	สมุทรสาคร	Central
Don Kam	ดอนกำ	Sankhaburi	สรรคบุรี	Chai Nat	ชัยนาท	Central
Don Kamyan	ดอนกำยาน	Mueang Suphanburi	เมืองสุพรรณบุรี	Suphan Buri	สุพรรณบุรี	Central
Don Kha	ดอนคา	Bang Phae	บางแพ	Ratchaburi	ราชบุรี	West
Don Kha	ดอนคา	Tha Tako	ท่าตะโก	Nakhon Sawan	นครสวรรค์	Central
Don Kha	ดอนคา	U Thong	อู่ทอง	Suphan Buri	สุพรรณบุรี	Central
Don Khamin	ดอนขมิ้น	Tha Maka	ท่ามะกา	Kanchanaburi	กาญจนบุรี	West
Don Khlang	ดอนคลัง	Damnoen Saduak	ดำเนินสะดวก	Ratchaburi	ราชบุรี	West
Don Khoi	ดอนข่อย	Kamphaeng Saen	กำแพงแสน	Nakhon Pathom	นครปฐม	Central
Don Khwang	ดอนขวาง	Mueang Uthai Thani	เมืองอุทัยธานี	Uthai Thani	อุทัยธานี	Central
Don Klang	ดอนกลาง	Kosum Phisai	โกสุมพิสัย	Maha Sarakham	มหาสารคาม	North-East
Don Kloi	ดอนกลอย	Phibun Rak	พิบูลย์รักษ์	Udon Thani	อุดรธานี	North-East
Don Kloi	ดอนกลอย	Nong Khayang	หนองขาหย่าง	Uthai Thani	อุทัยธานี	Central
Don Ko Ka	ดอนเกาะกา	Bang Nam Priao	บางน้ำเปรี้ยว	Chachoengsao	ฉะเชิงเทรา	East
Don Kok	ดอนกอก	Na Pho	นาโพธิ์	Buriram	บุรีรัมย์	North-East
Don Krabueang	ดอนกระเบื้อง	Photharam	โพธาราม	Ratchaburi	ราชบุรี	West
Don Krabueang	ดอนกระเบื้อง	Ban Pong	บ้านโป่ง	Ratchaburi	ราชบุรี	West
Don Kruai	ดอนกรวย	Damnoen Saduak	ดำเนินสะดวก	Ratchaburi	ราชบุรี	West
Don Lan	ดอนลาน	Phak Hai	ผักไห่	Phra Nakhon Si Ayutthaya	พระนครศรีอยุธยา	Central
Don Makluea	ดอนมะเกลือ	U Thong	อู่ทอง	Suphan Buri	สุพรรณบุรี	Central
Don Man	ดอนมัน	Prathai	ประทาย	Nakhon Ratchasima	นครราชสีมา	North-East
Don Manao	ดอนมะนาว	Song Phi Nong	สองพี่น้อง	Suphan Buri	สุพรรณบุรี	Central
Don Manora	ดอนมะโนรา	Bang Khonthi	บางคนที	Samut Songkhram	สมุทรสงคราม	Central
Don Masang	ดอนมะสังข์	Mueang Suphanburi	เมืองสุพรรณบุรี	Suphan Buri	สุพรรณบุรี	Central
Don Moei	ดอนเมย	Mueang Amnat Charoen	เมืองอำนาจเจริญ	Amnat Charoen	อำนาจเจริญ	North-East
Don Mon	ดอนมนต์	Satuek	สตึก	Buriram	บุรีรัมย์	North-East
Don Mot Daeng	ดอนมดแดง	Don Mot Daeng	ดอนมดแดง	Ubon Ratchathani	อุบลราชธานี	North-East
Don Mueang	ดอนเมือง	Sikhio	สีคิ้ว	Nakhon Ratchasima	นครราชสีมา	North-East
Don Mueang	ดอนเมือง	Khet Don Mueang	ดอนเมือง	Bangkok	กรุงเทพมหานคร	Central
Don Mun	ดอนมูล	Sung Men	สูงเม่น	Phrae	แพร่	North
Don Nang Hong	ดอนนางหงส์	That Phanom	ธาตุพนม	Nakhon Phanom	นครพนม	North-East
Don Ngoen	ดอนเงิน	Chiang Yuen	เชียงยืน	Maha Sarakham	มหาสารคาม	North-East
Don Ngua	ดอนงัว	Borabue	บรบือ	Maha Sarakham	มหาสารคาม	North-East
Don Ong	ดอนโอง	Pho Chai	โพธิ์ชัย	Roi Et	ร้อยเอ็ด	North-East
Don Pao	ดอนเปา	Mae Wang	แม่วาง	Chiang Mai	เชียงใหม่	North
Don Phai	ดอนไผ่	Damnoen Saduak	ดำเนินสะดวก	Ratchaburi	ราชบุรี	West
Don Pho	ดอนโพธิ์	Mueang Lopburi	เมืองลพบุรี	Lopburi	ลพบุรี	Central
Don Pho Thong	ดอนโพธิ์ทอง	Mueang Suphanburi	เมืองสุพรรณบุรี	Suphan Buri	สุพรรณบุรี	Central
Don Phut	ดอนพุด	Don Phut	ดอนพุด	Saraburi	สระบุรี	Central
Don Phutsa	ดอนพุทรา	Don Tum	ดอนตูม	Nakhon Pathom	นครปฐม	Central
Don Pradu	ดอนประดู่	Pak Phayun	ปากพะยูน	Phatthalung	พัทลุง	South
Don Pru	ดอนปรู	Si Prachan	ศรีประจันต์	Suphan Buri	สุพรรณบุรี	Central
Don Rae	ดอนแร่	Mueang Ratchaburi	เมืองราชบุรี	Ratchaburi	ราชบุรี	West
Don Raet	ดอนแรด	Rattanaburi	รัตนบุรี	Surin	สุรินทร์	North-East
Don Rak	ดอนรัก	Nong Chik	หนองจิก	Pattani	ปัตตานี	South
Don Ruak	ดอนรวก	Don Tum	ดอนตูม	Nakhon Pathom	นครปฐม	Central
Don Sai	ดอนทราย	Khuan Khanun	ควนขนุน	Phatthalung	พัทลุง	South
Don Sai	ดอนทราย	Pak Tho	ปากท่อ	Ratchaburi	ราชบุรี	West
Don Sai	ดอนทราย	Mai Kaen	ไม้แก่น	Pattani	ปัตตานี	South
Don Sai	ดอนทราย	Ban Pho	บ้านโพธิ์	Chachoengsao	ฉะเชิงเทรา	East
Don Sai	ดอนทราย	Pak Phayun	ปากพะยูน	Phatthalung	พัทลุง	South
Don Sai	ดอนทราย	Photharam	โพธาราม	Ratchaburi	ราชบุรี	West
Don Sak	ดอนสัก	Don Sak	ดอนสัก	Surat Thani	สุราษฎร์ธานี	South
Don Salaep	ดอนแสลบ	Huai Krachao	ห้วยกระเจา	Kanchanaburi	กาญจนบุรี	West
Don Si Chum	ดอนศรีชุม	Dok Khamtai	ดอกคำใต้	Phayao	พะเยา	North
Don Sila	ดอนศิลา	Wiang Chai	เวียงชัย	Chiang Rai	เชียงราย	North
Don Sombun	ดอนสมบูรณ์	Yang Talat	ยางตลาด	Kalasin	กาฬสินธุ์	North-East
Don Ta Phet	ดอนตาเพชร	Phanom Thuan	พนมทวน	Kanchanaburi	กาญจนบุรี	West
Don Taeng	ดอนแตง	Khanu Woralaksaburi	ขาณุวรลักษบุรี	Kamphaeng Phet	กำแพงเพชร	Central
Don Tako	ดอนตะโก	Tha Sala	ท่าศาลา	Nakhon Si Thammarat	นครศรีธรรมราช	South
Don Tako	ดอนตะโก	Mueang Ratchaburi	เมืองราชบุรี	Ratchaburi	ราชบุรี	West
Don Tan	ดอนตาล	Don Tan	ดอนตาล	Mukdahan	มุกดาหาร	North-East
Don Tan	ดอนตาล	Mueang Suphanburi	เมืองสุพรรณบุรี	Suphan Buri	สุพรรณบุรี	Central
Don Tanin	ดอนตะหนิน	Bua Yai	บัวใหญ่	Nakhon Ratchasima	นครราชสีมา	North-East
Don Thong	ดอนทอง	Nong Don	หนองโดน	Saraburi	สระบุรี	Central
Don Thong	ดอนทอง	Mueang Phitsanulok	เมืองพิษณุโลก	Phitsanulok	พิษณุโลก	Central
Don Toei	ดอนเตย	Na Thom	นาทม	Nakhon Phanom	นครพนม	North-East
Don Tro	ดอนตรอ	Chaloem Phra Kiat	เฉลิมพระเกียรติ	Nakhon Si Thammarat	นครศรีธรรมราช	South
Don Tum	ดอนตูม	Bang Len	บางเลน	Nakhon Pathom	นครปฐม	Central
Don Wai	ดอนหวาย	Non Sung	โนนสูง	Nakhon Ratchasima	นครราชสีมา	North-East
Don Wan	ดอนหว่าน	Mueang Maha Sarakham	เมืองมหาสารคาม	Maha Sarakham	มหาสารคาม	North-East
Don Ya Nang	ดอนหญ้านาง	Phon Charoen	พรเจริญ	Bueng Kan	บึงกาฬ	North-East
Don Ya Nang	ดอนหญ้านาง	Phachi	ภาชี	Phra Nakhon Si Ayutthaya	พระนครศรีอยุธยา	Central
Don Yai	ดอนใหญ่	Si Mueang Mai	ศรีเมืองใหม่	Ubon Ratchathani	อุบลราชธานี	North-East
Don Yai	ดอนใหญ่	Bang Phae	บางแพ	Ratchaburi	ราชบุรี	West
Don Yai	ดอนใหญ่	Khong	คง	Nakhon Ratchasima	นครราชสีมา	North-East
Don Yai Hom	ดอนยายหอม	Mueang Nakhon Pathom	เมืองนครปฐม	Nakhon Phanom	นครพนม	North-East
Don Yai Nu	ดอนยายหนู	Kui Buri	กุยบุรี	Prachuap Khiri Khan	ประจวบคีรีขันธ์	West
Don Yang	ดอนยาง	Mueang Phetchaburi	เมืองเพชรบุรี	Phetchaburi	เพชรบุรี	West
Don Yang	ดอนยาง	Phato	พะโต๊ะ	Chumphon	ชุมพร	South
Don Yao Yai	ดอนยาวใหญ่	Non Daeng	โนนแดง	Nakhon Ratchasima	นครราชสีมา	North-East
Don Yo	ดอนยอ	Mueang Nakhon Nayok	เมืองนครนายก	Nakhon Nayok	นครนายก	Central
Dong Bang	ดงบัง	Bueng Khong Long	บึงโขงหลง	Bueng Kan	บึงกาฬ	North-East
Dong Bang	ดงบัง	Lue Amnat	ลืออำนาจ	Amnat Charoen	อำนาจเจริญ	North-East
Dong Bang	ดงบัง	Na Dun	นาดูน	Maha Sarakham	มหาสารคาม	North-East
Dong Bang	ดงบัง	Prachantakham	ประจันตคาม	Prachin Buri	ปราจีนบุรี	East
Dong Bang	ดงบัง	Khon San	คอนสาร	Chaiyaphum	ชัยภูมิ	North-East
Dong Chen	ดงเจน	Phu Kamyao	ภูกามยาว	Phayao	พะเยา	North
Dong Chon	ดงชน	Mueang Sakon Nakhon	เมืองสกลนคร	Sakon Nakhon	สกลนคร	North-East
Dong Daeng	ดงแดง	Chaturaphak Phiman	จตุรพักตรพิมาน	Roi Et	ร้อยเอ็ด	North-East
Dong Dam	ดงดำ	Li	ลี้	Lamphun	ลำพูน	North
Dong Din Daeng	ดงดินแดง	Nong Muang	หนองม่วง	Lopburi	ลพบุรี	Central
Đông Duan	ดงดวน	Na Dun	นาดูน	Maha Sarakham	มหาสารคาม	North-East
Đông Dueai	ดงเดือย	Kong Krailat	กงไกรลาศ	Sukhothai	สุโขทัย	Central
Dong I Chan	ดงอีจาน	Non Suwan	โนนสุวรรณ	Buriram	บุรีรัมย์	North-East
Dong Kam Met	ดองกำเม็ด	Khukhan	ขุขันธ์	Sisaket	ศรีสะเกษ	North-East
Đông Khêng	ดงเค็ง	Nong Song Hong	หนองสองห้อง	Khon Kaen	ขอนแก่น	North-East
Dong Khilek	ดงขี้เหล็ก	Mueang Prachinburi	เมืองปราจีนบุรี	Prachin Buri	ปราจีนบุรี	East
Dong Khon	ดงคอน	Sankhaburi	สรรคบุรี	Chai Nat	ชัยนาท	Central
Dong Khrang Noi	ดงครั่งน้อย	Kaset Wisai	เกษตรวิสัย	Roi Et	ร้อยเอ็ด	North-East
Dong Khrang Yai	ดงครั่งใหญ่	Kaset Wisai	เกษตรวิสัย	Roi Et	ร้อยเอ็ด	North-East
Dong Khu	ดงคู่	Si Satchanalai	ศรีสัชนาลัย	Sukhothai	สุโขทัย	Central
Dong Khui	ดงขุย	Chon Daen	ชนแดน	Phetchabun	เพชรบูรณ์	Central
Dong Khwang	ดงขวาง	Mueang Nakhon Phanom	เมืองนครพนม	Nakhon Phanom	นครพนม	North-East
Dong Khwang	ดงขวาง	Nong Khayang	หนองขาหย่าง	Uthai Thani	อุทัยธานี	Central
Dong Klang	ดงกลาง	Mueang Phichit	เมืองพิจิตร	Phichit	พิจิตร	Central
Dong Klang	ดงกลาง	Chaturaphak Phiman	จตุรพักตรพิมาน	Roi Et	ร้อยเอ็ด	North-East
Dong Klang	ดงกลาง	Khon San	คอนสาร	Chaiyaphum	ชัยภูมิ	North-East
Dong Krathong Yam	ดงกระทงยาม	Si Maha Phot	ศรีมหาโพธิ	Prachin Buri	ปราจีนบุรี	East
Dong Lakhon	ดงละคร	Mueang Nakhon Nayok	เมืองนครนายก	Nakhon Nayok	นครนายก	Central
Dong Lan	ดงลาน	Mueang Roi Et	เมืองร้อยเอ็ด	Roi Et	ร้อยเอ็ด	North-East
Dong Lan	ดงลาน	Si Chomphu	สีชมพู	Khon Kaen	ขอนแก่น	North-East
Dong Ling	ดงลิง	Kamalasai	กมลาไสย	Kalasin	กาฬสินธุ์	North-East
Dong Luang	ดงหลวง	Dong Luang	ดงหลวง	Mukdahan	มุกดาหาร	North-East
Dong Mayang	ดงมะยาง	Lue Amnat	ลืออำนาจ	Amnat Charoen	อำนาจเจริญ	North-East
Dong Mada	ดงมะดะ	Mae Lao	แม่ลาว	Chiang Rai	เชียงราย	North
Dong Mafai	ดงมะไฟ	Mueang Sakon Nakhon	เมืองสกลนคร	Sakon Nakhon	สกลนคร	North-East
Dong Mafai	ดงมะไฟ	Suwannakhuha	สุวรรณคูหา	Nong Bua Lamphu	หนองบัวลำภู	North-East
Dong Maha Wan	ดงมหาวัน	Wiang Chiang Rung	เวียงเชียงรุ้ง	Chiang Rai	เชียงราย	North
Dong Marum	ดงมะรุม	Khok Samrong	โคกสำโรง	Lopburi	ลพบุรี	Central
Dong Mo Thong	ดงหม้อทอง	Ban Muang	บ้านม่วง	Sakon Nakhon	สกลนคร	North-East
Dong Mo Thong Tai	ดงหม้อทองใต้	Ban Muang	บ้านม่วง	Sakon Nakhon	สกลนคร	North-East
Dong Mon	ดงมอน	Mueang Mukdahan	เมืองมุกดาหาร	Mukdahan	มุกดาหาร	North-East
Dong Mu	ดงหมู	Wan Yai	หว้านใหญ่	Mukdahan	มุกดาหาร	North-East
Dong Mueang	ดงเมือง	Yang Sisurat	ยางสีสุราช	Maha Sarakham	มหาสารคาม	North-East
Dong Mueang Aem	ดงเมืองแอม	Khao Suan Kwang	เขาสวนกวาง	Khon Kaen	ขอนแก่น	North-East
Dong Mun	ดงมูล	Nong Kung Si	หนองกุงศรี	Kalasin	กาฬสินธุ์	North-East
Dong Mun Lek	ดงมูลเหล็ก	Mueang Phetchabun	เมืองเพชรบูรณ์	Phetchabun	เพชรบูรณ์	Central
Dong Noi	ดงน้อย	Ratchasan	ราชสาส์น	Chachoengsao	ฉะเชิงเทรา	East
Dong Nuea	ดงเหนือ	Ban Muang	บ้านม่วง	Sakon Nakhon	สกลนคร	North-East
Dong Pa Kham	ดงป่าคำ	Mueang Phichit	เมืองพิจิตร	Phichit	พิจิตร	Central
Dong Phayung	ดงพยุง	Don Chan	ดอนจาน	Kalasin	กาฬสินธุ์	North-East
Dong Phlap	ดงพลับ	Ban Mi	บ้านหมี่	Lopburi	ลพบุรี	Central
Dong Phlong	ดงพลอง	Khaen Dong	แคนดง	Buriram	บุรีรัมย์	North-East
Dong Phraram	ดงพระราม	Mueang Prachinburi	เมืองปราจีนบุรี	Prachin Buri	ปราจีนบุรี	East
Dong Prakham	ดงประคำ	Phrom Phiram	พรหมพิราม	Phitsanulok	พิษณุโลก	Central
Dong Rak	ดงรัก	Benchalak	เบญจลักษ์	Sisaket	ศรีสะเกษ	North-East
Dong Rak	ดงรัก	Phu Sing	ภูสิงห์	Sisaket	ศรีสะเกษ	North-East
Dong Sawan	ดงสวรรค์	Na Klang	นากลาง	Nong Bua Lamphu	หนองบัวลำภู	North-East
Dong Sing	ดงสิงห์	Changhan	จังหาร	Roi Et	ร้อยเอ็ด	North-East
Dong Sombun	ดงสมบูรณ์	Tha Khantho	ท่าคันโท	Kalasin	กาฬสินธุ์	North-East
Dong Suea Lueang	ดงเสือเหลือง	Pho Prathap Chang	โพธิ์ประทับช้าง	Phichit	พิจิตร	Central
Dong Suwan	ดงสุวรรณ	Dok Khamtai	ดอกคำใต้	Phayao	พะเยา	North
Dong Ta Ngao	ดงตะงาว	Don Phut	ดอนพุด	Saraburi	สระบุรี	Central
Dong Takhop	ดงตะขบ	Taphan Hin	ตะพานหิน	Phichit	พิจิตร	Central
Dong Yai	ดงใหญ่	Phimai	พิมาย	Nakhon Ratchasima	นครราชสีมา	North-East
Dong Yai	ดงใหญ่	Wapi Pathum	วาปีปทุม	Maha Sarakham	มหาสารคาม	North-East
Dong Yang	ดงยาง	Na Dun	นาดูน	Maha Sarakham	มหาสารคาม	North-East
Dong Yen	ดงเย็น	Mueang Mukdahan	เมืองมุกดาหาร	Mukdahan	มุกดาหาร	North-East
Dong Yen	ดงเย็น	Ban Dung	บ้านดุง	Udon Thani	อุดรธานี	North-East
Dot	โดด	Pho Si Suwan	โพธิ์ศรีสุวรรณ	Sisaket	ศรีสะเกษ	North-East
Du	ดู่	Kanthararom	กันทรารมย์	Sisaket	ศรีสะเกษ	North-East
Du	ดู่	Prang Ku	ปรางค์กู่	Sisaket	ศรีสะเกษ	North-East
Du	ดู่	Rasi Salai	ราษีไศล	Sisaket	ศรีสะเกษ	North-East
Du Noi	ดู่น้อย	Chaturaphak Phiman	จตุรพักตรพิมาน	Roi Et	ร้อยเอ็ด	North-East
Du Phong	ดู่พงษ์	Santi Suk	สันติสุข	Nan	น่าน	North
Duan Yai	ดวนใหญ่	Mueang Chan	เมืองจันทร์	Sisaket	ศรีสะเกษ	North-East
Duan Yai	ดวนใหญ่	Wang Hin	วังหิน	Sisaket	ศรีสะเกษ	North-East
Duea Si Khan Chai	เดื่อศรีคันไชย	Wanon Niwat	วานรนิวาส	Sakon Nakhon	สกลนคร	North-East
Duk Ueng	ดูกอึ่ง	Nong Hi	หนองฮี	Roi Et	ร้อยเอ็ด	North-East
Dum Yai	ดุมใหญ่	Muang Sam Sip	ม่วงสามสิบ	Ubon Ratchathani	อุบลราชธานี	North-East
Dun	ดูน	Kanthararom	กันทรารมย์	Sisaket	ศรีสะเกษ	North-East
Dun Sat	ดูนสาด	Kranuan	กระนวน	Khon Kaen	ขอนแก่น	North-East
Dusit	ดุสิต	Khet Dusit	ดุสิต	Bangkok	กรุงเทพมหานคร	Central
Dusit	ดุสิต	Tham Phannara	ถ้ำพรรณรา	Nakhon Si Thammarat	นครศรีธรรมราช	South
Dusongyo	ดุซงญอ	Chanae	จะแนะ	Narathiwat	นราธิวาส	South

== See also ==
- Organization of the government of Thailand
- List of districts of Thailand
- List of districts of Bangkok
- List of tambon in Thailand
- Provinces of Thailand
- List of municipalities in Thailand
