= Ho Kham =

Ho Kham may refer to two administrative units, covering the same area

- Ho Kham subdistrict
- Ho Kham municipality
