= Khok Sung =

Khok Sung may refer to:

- Khok Sung District in Sa Kaeo Province, Thailand
- Khok Sung, Nakhon Ratchasima, a township municipality and subdistrict in Mueang Nakhon Ratchasima District, Nakhon Ratchasima Province, Thailand
