= Nong Khai Nam =

Coordinates: 15.105296°N 102.176689°E

Nong Khai Nam (Thai: เทศบาลตำบลหนองไข่น้ำ) is in the Mueang Nakhon Ratchasima district of Nakhon Ratchasima province, Thailand. It was created in 1999, and covers 43.44 km^{2}, eight villages and 5,792 citizens.
