= Thanayut Kaewjohor =

Thai footballer (born 1986)

Personal information
- Full name: Thanayut Kaewjohor
- Date of birth: 23 August 1986 (age 40)
- Place of birth: Nakhon Ratchasima, Thailand
- Height: 1.70 m (5 ft 7 in)
- Position: Defender

Team information
- Current team: Bangkok United
- Number: 6

Youth career
- 2005: Bangkok United

Senior career*
Years	Team	Apps	(Gls)
2006–present	Bangkok United	29	(0)
- * Club domestic league appearances and goals as of 14 November 2008

Thanayut Kaewjohor is a Thai professional footballer who currently plays for Bangkok United in the Thailand Premier League.

He previously played for Bangkok University FC in the 2007 AFC Champions League group stage.
