= Dan Kwian =

Village and subdistrict in Thailand

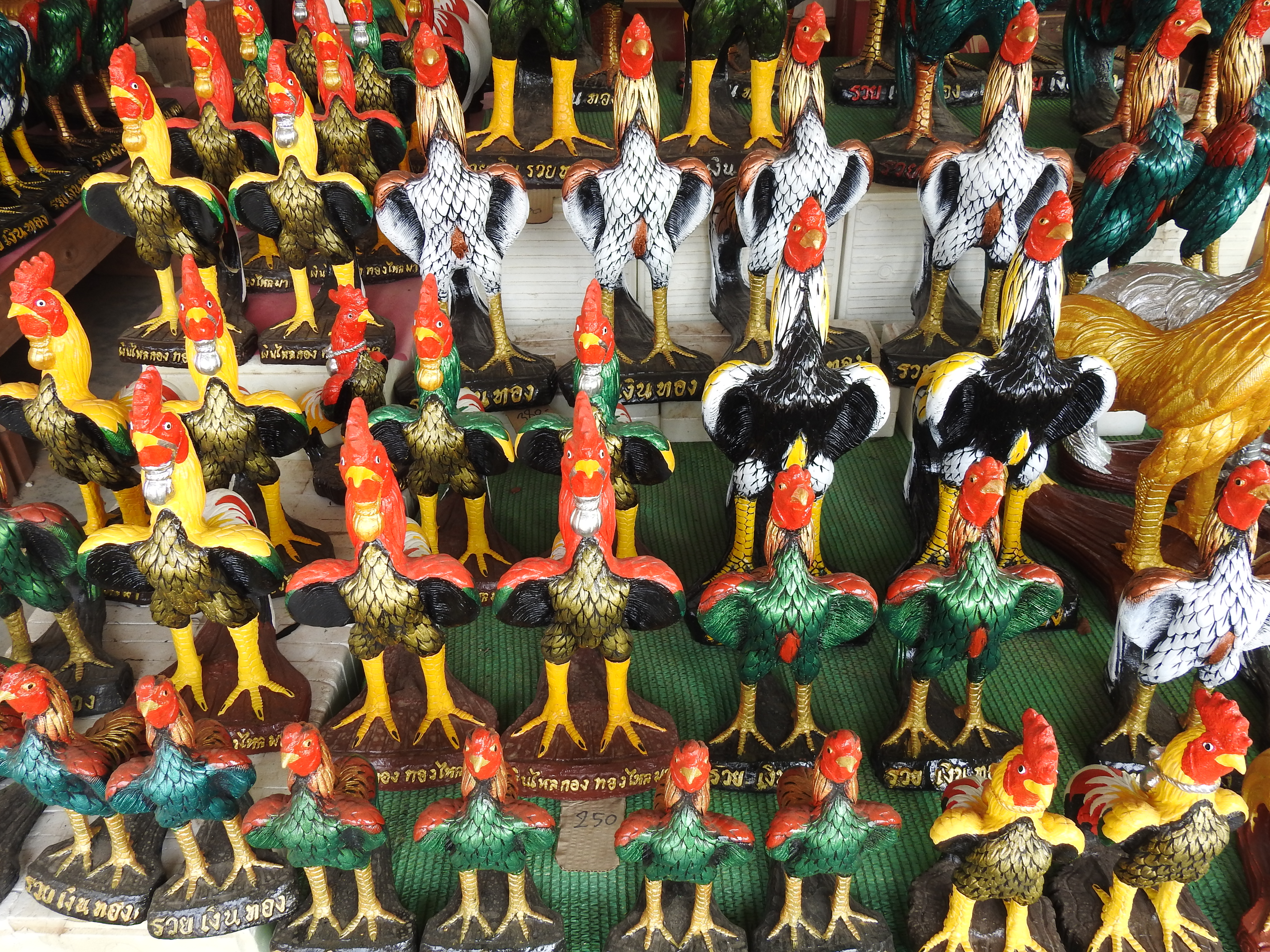
Crafts for sale in Dan Kwian, 2019.

Dan Kwian (Thai: ด่านเกวียน) is a village and subdistrict in Chok Chai District, Nakhon Ratchasima Province. It is known for its pottery and handicrafts. The village name Dan Kwian means toll station or check point (Dan) for oxcarts (Kwian).

== Location ==
Dan Kwian sits at a narrows of the Mun (Thai: แม่น้ำมูล) river and was a convenient river crossing point. The river provided the means for distributing utilitarian pottery produced in Dan Kwian to a wide market. The village, located on the road connecting Nakhon Ratchasima and Chok Chai, is broken into two distinct parts. Dan Kwian Din Phao (ด่านเกวียนดินเผา), a congregation of larger factories and a roadside sales area for ceramics, both local and sourced from other centers in Thailand, is located about 2 kilometers north of the historic village Moo Baan Dan Kwian (หมู่บ้านด่านเกวียน). The Tambon covers a 10.17 km^{2} area. The people of Dan Kwian are mostly employed in handicrafts and farming.

== History ==
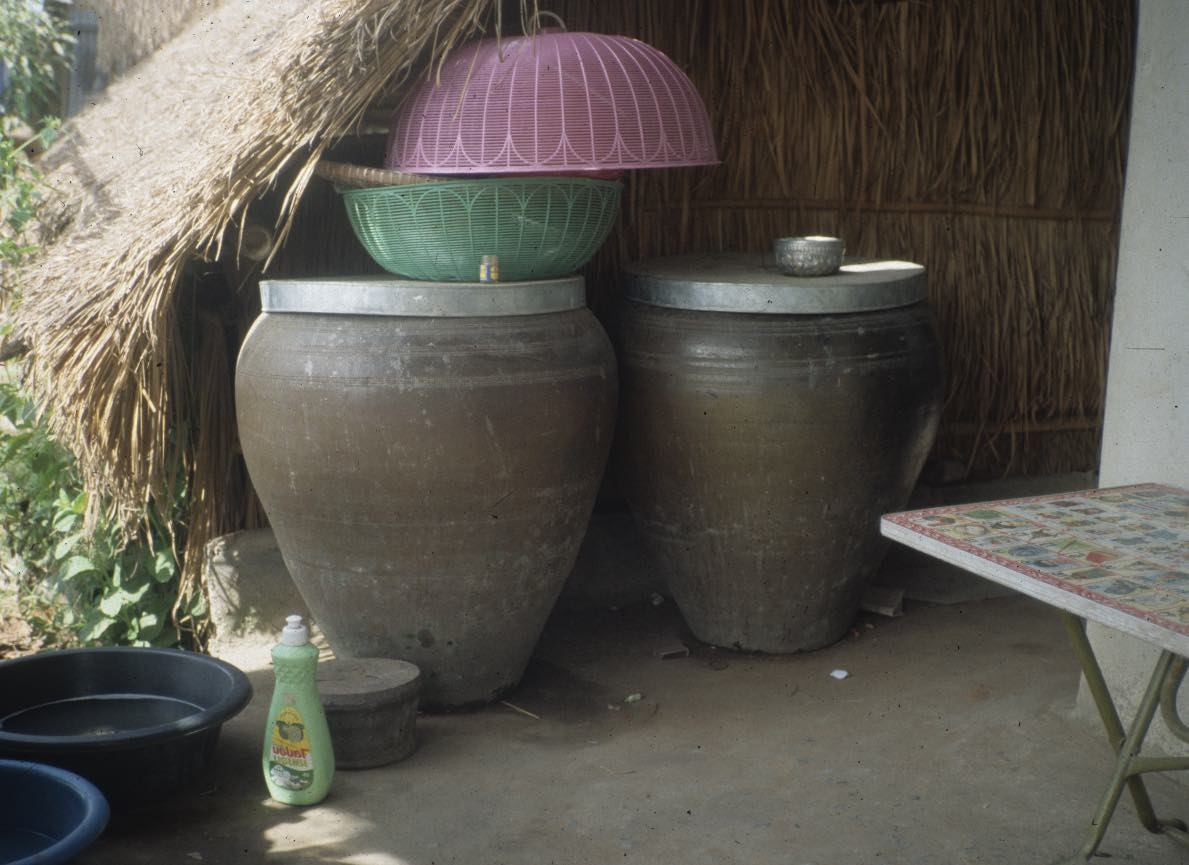
These are two Dan Kwian water jars in use in 1989

Pottery production in the area is said to have started around 1740, although this date has not been verified. The same account states that pottery production began with Mon (Thai: มอญ) refugees similar to the potters of Ko Kred (Kred Island). This claim, although popularly held, may not be accurate.

Prior to approximately 1972 nearly all the products of Dan Kwian kilns were functional vessels. Common forms were water storage jars of around 50 liters capacity, lidded jars for preparing fermented fish, mortars, and basins. There is no evidence of historic tableware production at Dan Kwian. Most of the pottery is fired in above-ground anagama-style wood kilns, although at least one noborigama chamber kiln, many gas kilns, and at least one electric kiln have been used in recent years. Ceramic ware in Dan Kwian was traditionally fired in two distinct styles, Phao Dam (Thai:เผาดำ), or "fired black," and Phao Deng (Thai:เผาแดง), "fired red." Phao Dam ware was fired to temperatures between approximately 1,200 °C (2,190 °F) and 1,250 °C (2,280 °F). The ware at this temperature became dark brown and vitreous. Phao Dam wares were prized for durability and lack of porosity. Most notable of these products are the once ubiquitous Dan Kwian water jars.

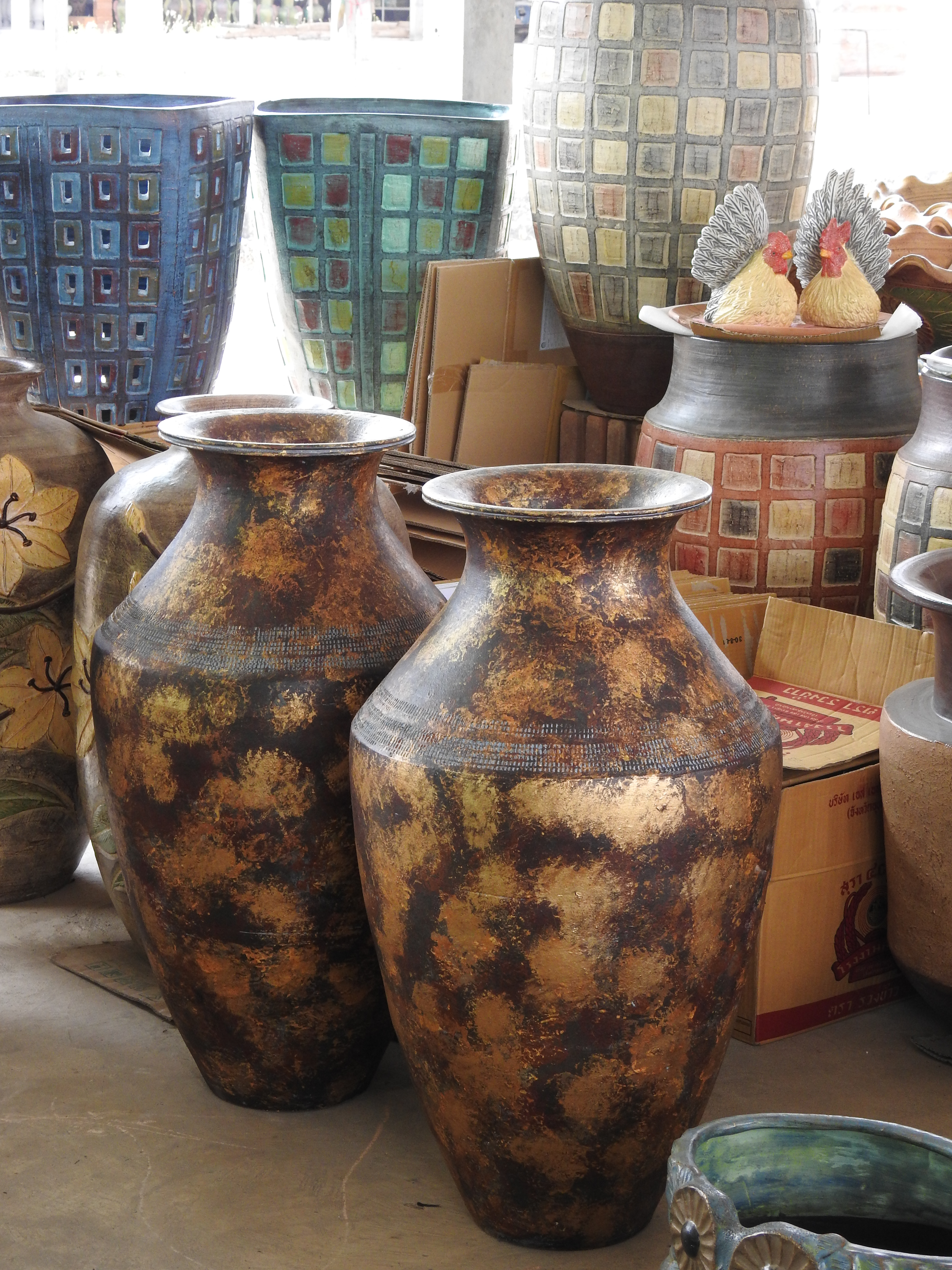
Pottery for sale in Dan Kwian, 2019.

Starting around 1972, decorative ware started to be made in Dan Kwian to serve a new market of urban consumers centered in Bangkok. University-based designers became involved with developing new products for hotels and other public spaces as well as private homes. At first this decorative ware consisted simply of water jars ornamented with carved decoration. Gradually the decorative ware expanded to include varied ornamental vessel forms, clay tile, carved ceramic murals, ceramic jewellery, and free-standing sculpture. Other media are also now produced in Dan Kwian, most notably cement-based carved sandstone replicas.
