= Nakhon Ratchasima railway station =

Railway station in Thailand

Coordinates: 14°58′21″N 102°04′44″E

Nakhon Ratchasima นครราชสีมา
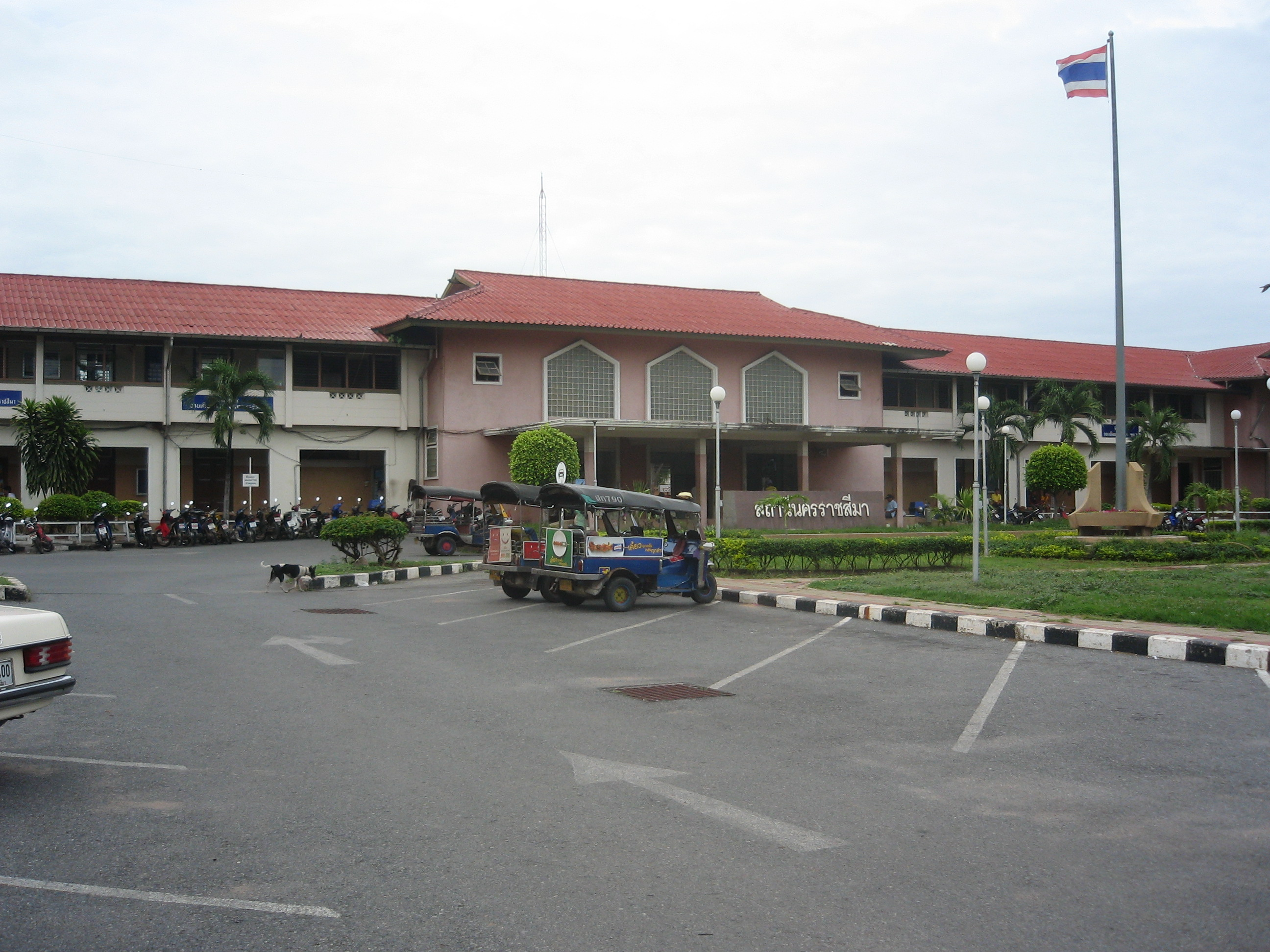

General information
- Location: Mukkhamontri Rd, Nai Muang, Muang, Nakhon Ratchasima; Nakhon Ratchasima Province; Thailand
- Operator: State Railway of Thailand
- Manager: Ministry of Transport
- Line: Ubon Ratchathani Main Line
- Platforms: 3
- Tracks: 10

Construction
- Structure type: Concrete building
- Accessible: Yes

Other information
- Station code: รส.
- Classification: Class 1

History
- Opened: 11 November 1900
- Rebuilt: 24 June 1955
- Former names: Khorat

Passengers
- 64,000

Services
Preceding station	State Railway of Thailand	Following station
Phukhao Lat towards Hua Lamphong or Krung Thep Aphiwat	Northeastern Line	Thanon Chira Junction towards Ubon Ratchathani or Khamsavath (Laos)
Location

Nakhon Ratchasima railway station is a 1st class station and the main railway station in Nakhon Ratchasima Province in Thailand. This station located in west side of the city of Nakhon Ratchasima. There are 18 daily trains and one daily Eastern & Oriental Express trains served to this station. Also, there are 4 to 6 special trains service in New Year, Songkran or other special festival. In the 2008 census, Nakhon Ratchasima Station served nearly 800,000 passengers.

== History ==
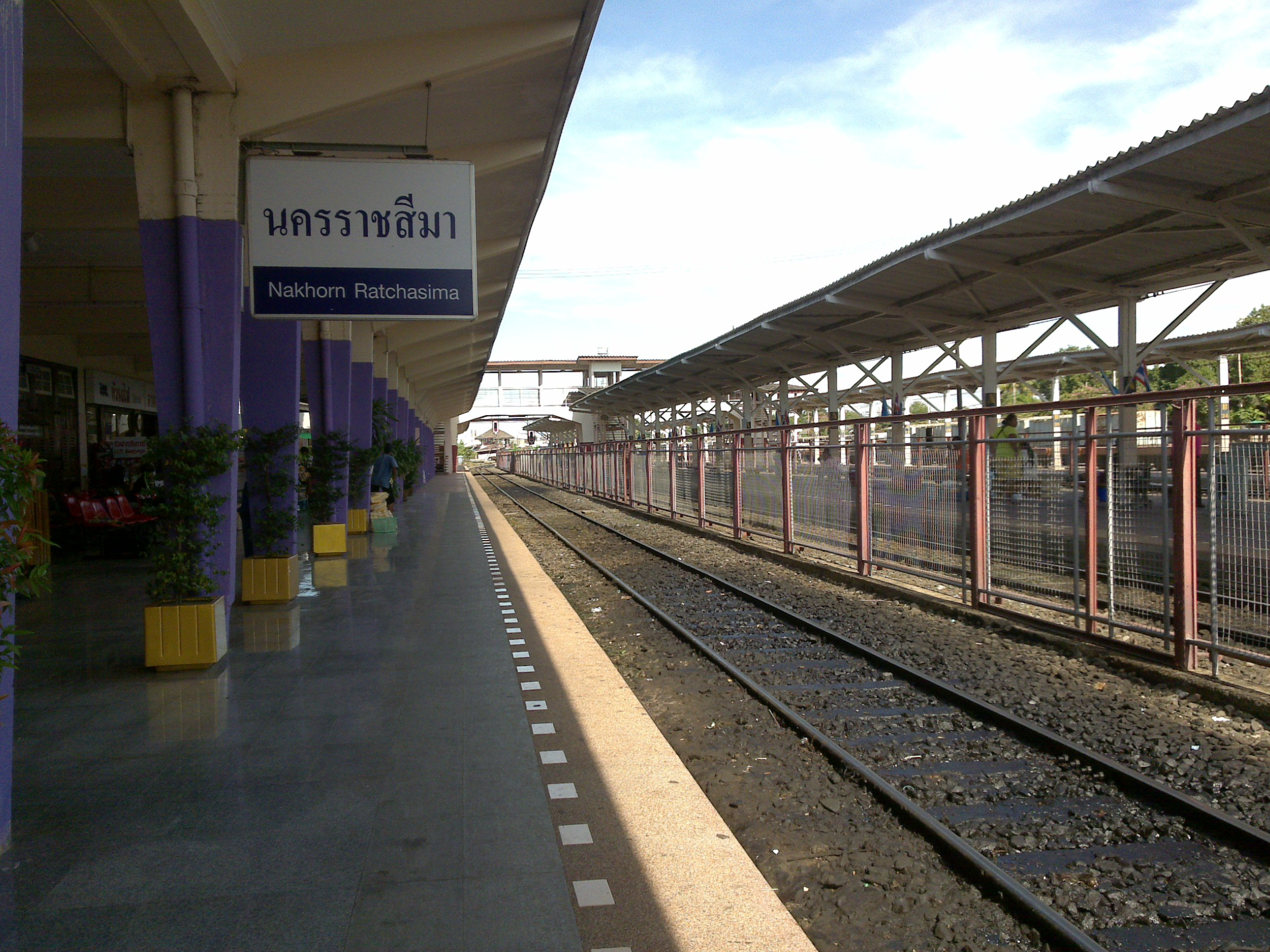
Platform of Nakhon Ratchasima station

Nakhon Ratchasima station was opened for service as Khorat Station using Standard gauge rolling stock on 11 November 1900. The opening ceremony was performed by King Chulalongkorn on 21 December 1900 as the terminus for the Nakhon Ratchasima Line from Bangkok.

The station was the terminus for the Northeastern region for about 20 years until the opening of the Tha Chang section of the Ubon Ratchathani Line on 1 November 1922. The gauge had previously been changed from standard gauge (4 ft 8 1/2 in) to one meter (1m) gauge and this work was completed in July 1922.

The station name was changed from Khorat station to Nakhon Ratchasima station in 1934.

The weekly Northeastern Express to Ubon Ratchathani (then called the Varindr terminus) was introduced to Ubon Ratchathani on 19 March 1938. Diesel Electric Locomotive power from Frich and SLM ran from Bangkok to Nakhon Ratchasima and the rest of the route (Nakhon Ratchasima station - Varindr) was covered by Hanomag Pacific Steam Locomotive. A weekly express to Khonkaen was introduced on 3 November 1939 and it was extended to Udon Thani on 24 June 1941, the opening day of Udon Thani station.

The station was bombed during World War II and the present station building replaced the wooden building on 24 June 1955 along with the construction of a new depot and maintenance center.

The current station will be dismantled soon to make space for the double track extension and the high speed rail between Bangkok and Vientiene (under construction)

== Train services ==
- Diesel Railcar Special Express train No. 21 from Bangkok to Ubon Ratchathani
- Diesel Railcar Special Express train No. 22 from Ubon Ratchathani to Bangkok
- E-sanwattana Special Express train No. 23 from Bangkok to Ubon Ratchathani
- E-sanwattana Special Express train No. 24 from Ubon Ratchathani to Bangkok
- Express train No.67 from Bangkok to Ubon Ratchathani
- Express train No.68 from Ubon Ratchathani to Bangkok
- Diesel Railcar Express train No. 71 from Ubon Ratchathani to Bangkok
- Diesel Railcar Express train No. 72 from Bangkok to Ubon Ratchathani
- Diesel Railcar Express train No. 77 from Bangkok to Nong Khai
- Diesel Railcar Express train No. 78 Udon Thani to Bangkok
- Rapid train No. 135 from Bangkok to Ubon Ratchathani
- Rapid train No. 136 from Ubon Ratchathani to Bangkok
- Rapid train No. 139 from Bangkok to Ubon Ratchathani
- Rapid train No. 140 from Ubon Ratchathani to Bangkok
- Rapid train No. 141 from Bangkok to Ubon Ratchathani
- Rapid train No. 142 from Ubon Ratchathani to Bangkok
- Rapid train No. 145 from Bangkok to Ubon Ratchathani
- Rapid train No. 146 from Ubon Ratchathani to Bangkok
- Ordinary train No. 233 from Bangkok to Surin
- Ordinary train No. 234 from Surin to Bangkok
- Local train No. 415 from Nakhon Ratchasima to Nong Khai
- Local train No. 418 from Nong Khai to Nakhon Ratchasima
- Local train No. 416 from Nakhon Ratchasima to Udon Thani
- Local train No. 417 from Udon Thani to Nakhon Ratchasima
- Local train No. 419 from Nakhon Ratchasima to Ubon Ratchathani
- Local train No. 420 from Ubon Ratchathani to Nakhon Ratchasima
- Local train No. 421 from Nakhon Ratchasima to Ubon Ratchathani
- Local train No. 426 from Ubon Ratchathani to Nakhon Ratchasima
- Local train No. 424 from Samrong Thab to Nakhon Ratchasima
- Local train No. 427 from Nakhon Ratchasima to Ubon Ratchathani
- Local train No. 428 from Ubon Ratchathani to Nakhon Ratchasima
- Local train No. 429 from Nakhon Ratchasima to Bua Yai junction
- Local train No. 430 from Bua Yai Junction to Nakhon Ratchasima
- Local train No. 431 from Kaeng Khoi Junction to Khon Kaen
- Local train No. 432 from Khon Kaen to Kaeng Khoi Junction
