= Nakhon Ratchasima =

Nakhon Ratchasima นครราชสีมา Korat
- City municipality
- City of Nakhon Ratchasima เทศบาลนครนครราชสีมา
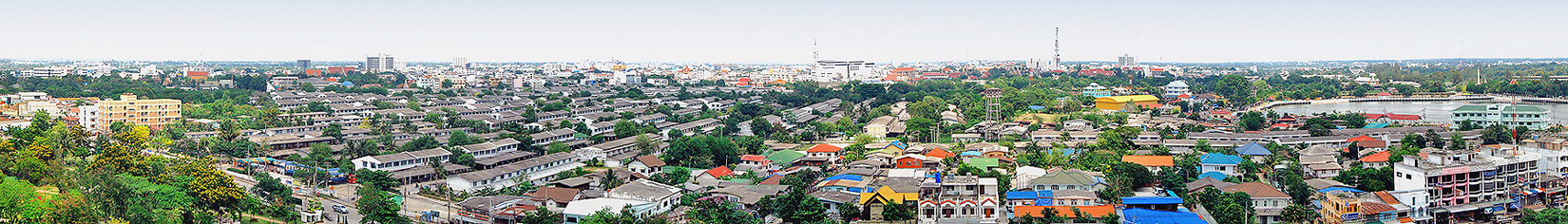
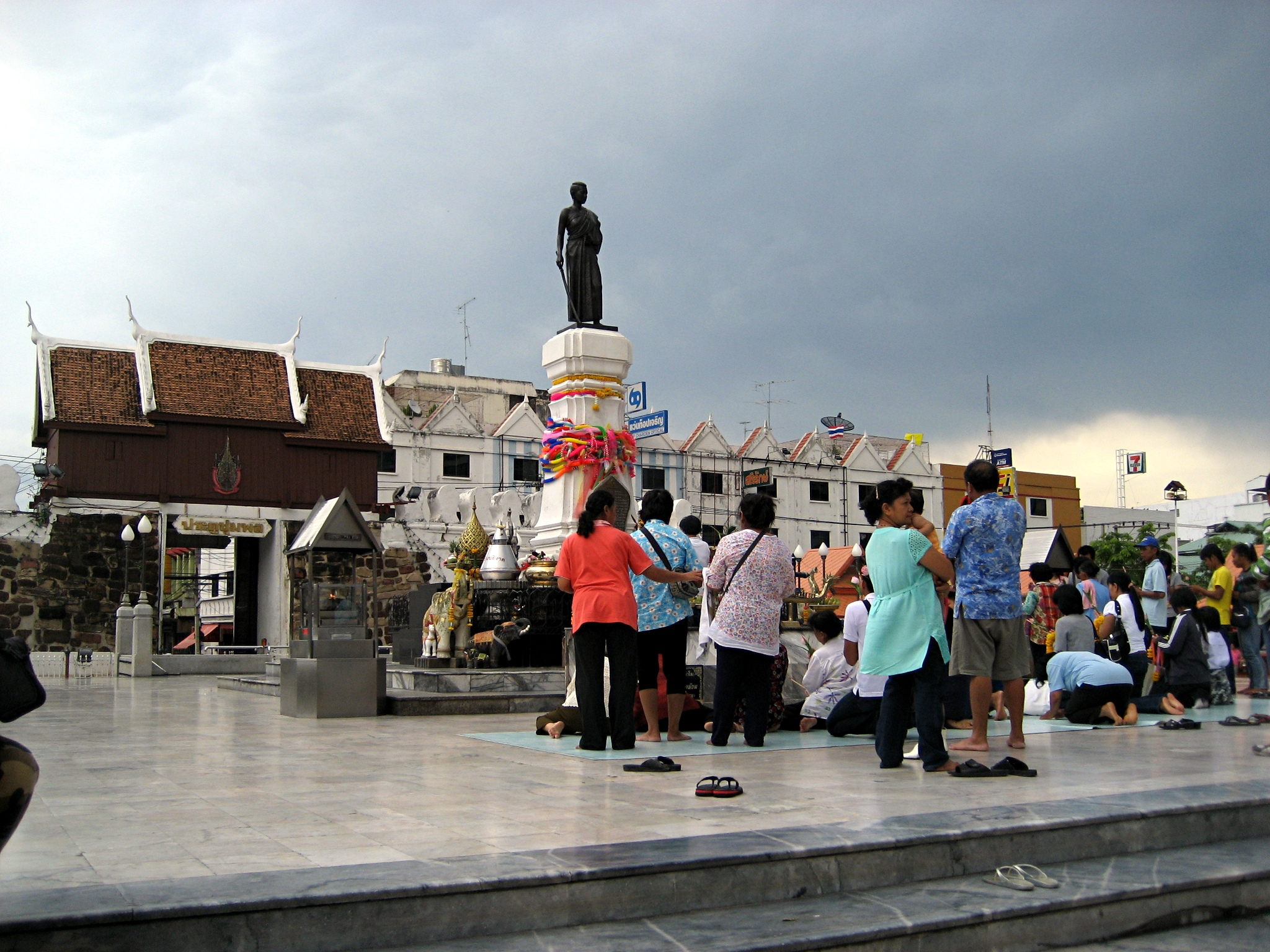
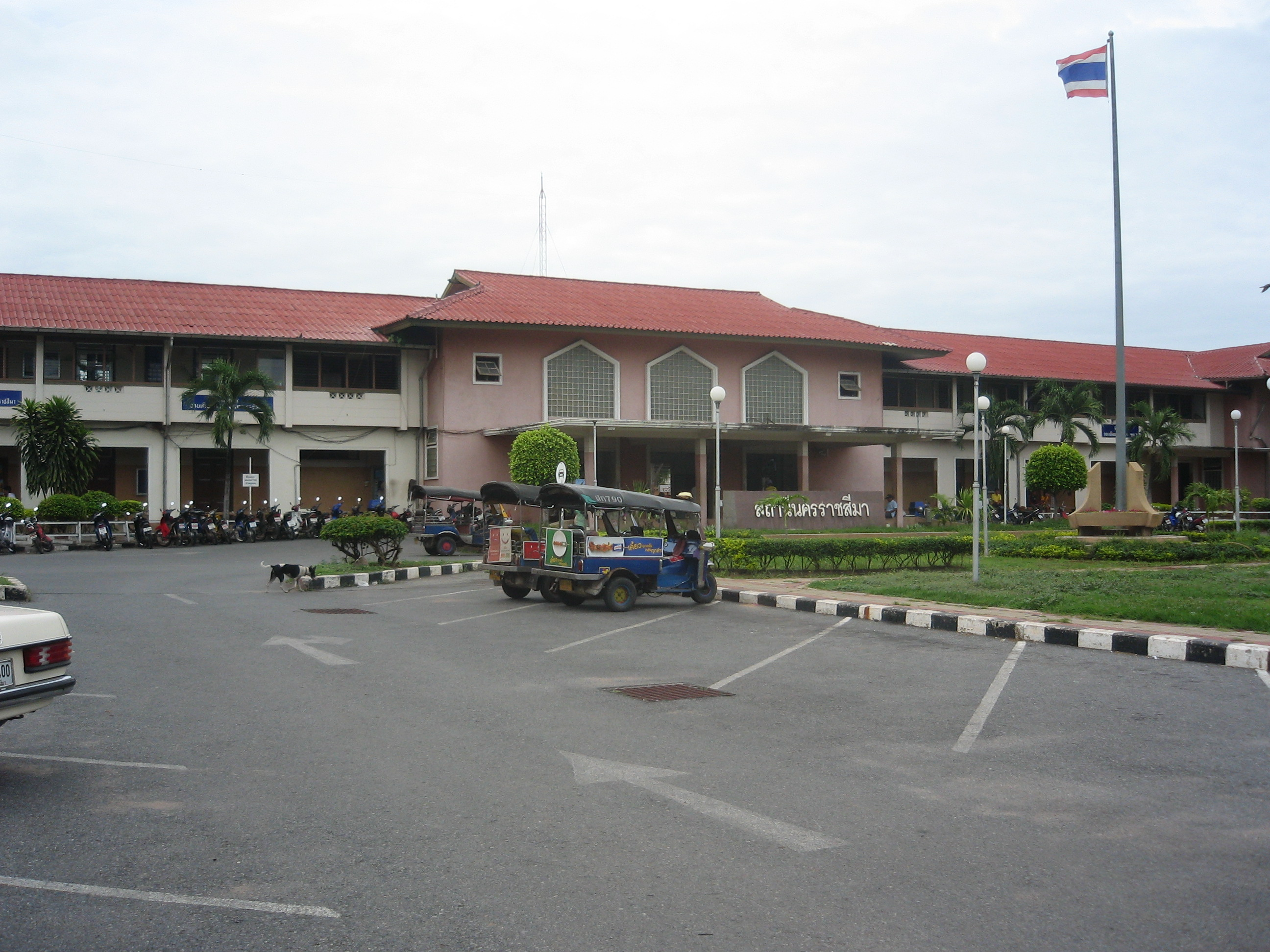
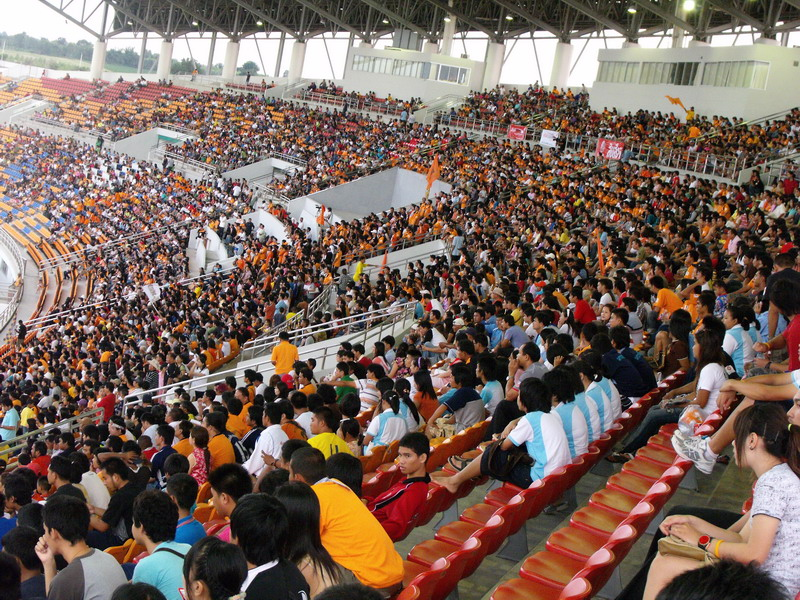
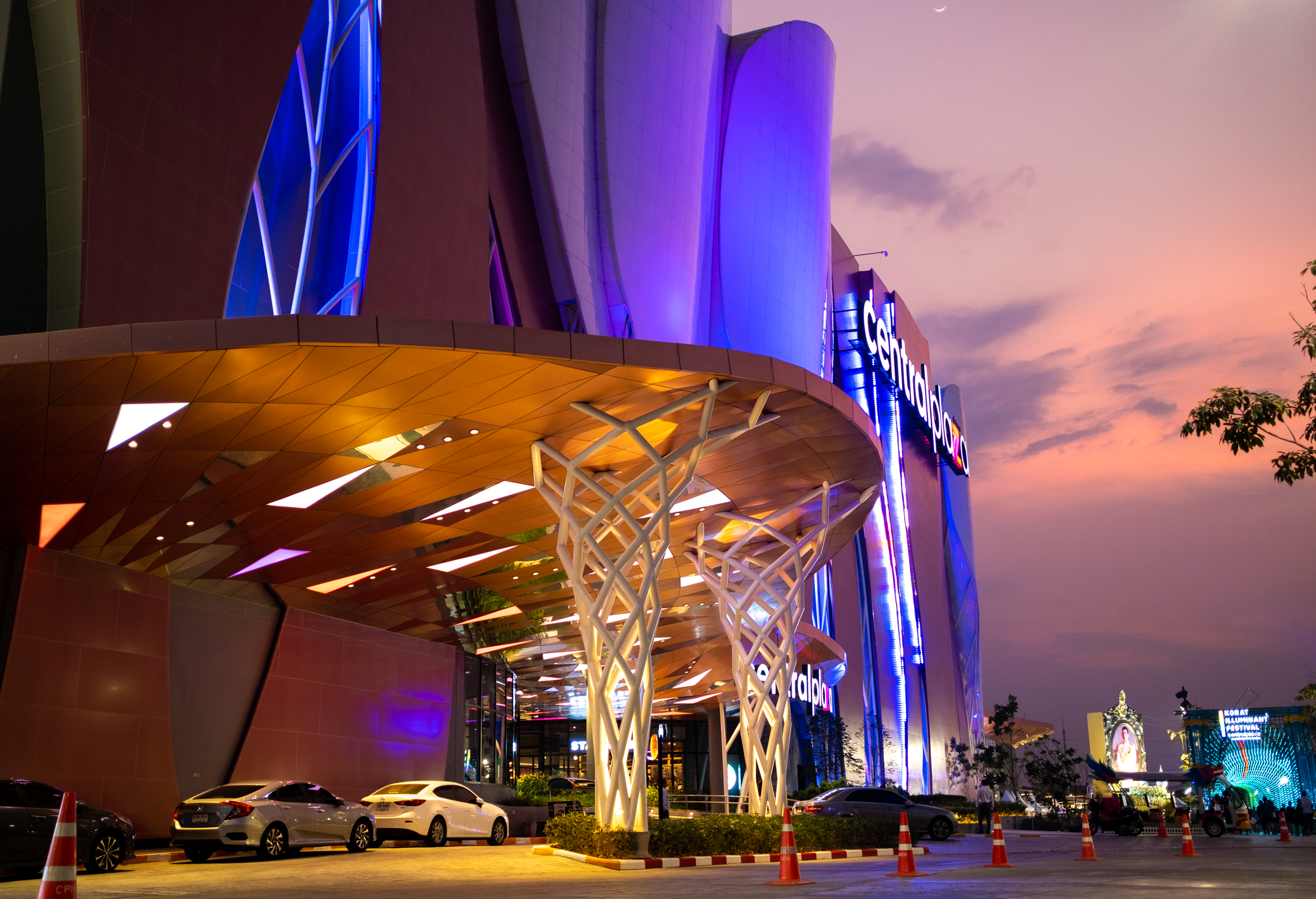
- From top left: View of Nakhon Ratchasima, monument of Thao Suranari with the Chumphon Gate in the background, Nakhon Ratchasima railway station, 80th Birthday Stadium and Central Korat

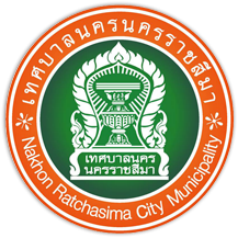
- Seal

- Location in Thailand
- Coordinates: 14°58′50″N 102°6′00″E
- Country: Thailand
- Province: Nakhon Ratchasima
- District: Mueang Nakhon Ratchasima
- Settled: 1656 (Ayutthaya Period)
- Sanitation: 3 Jan 1908
- Town: 10 Dec 1935
- City: 24 Sept 1995

Government
  - Type: City municipality
  - Mayor: Surawuth Cherdchai
  - Municipal Clerk: Arlom Tangtaku

Area
  - City municipality: 37.5 km^{2} (14.5 sq mi)
  - Urban: 755.6 km^{2} (291.7 sq mi)
  - Rank: 13th
- Elevation: 180 m (590 ft)

Population (2019)
  - City municipality: 126,391 (Registered residents)
  - Rank: 7th in Thailand
  - Density: 3,370/km^{2} (8,700/sq mi)
  - Urban: 466,098
  - Urban density: 616.85/km^{2} (1,597.6/sq mi)
- Time zone: UTC+7 (ICT)
- Postcode: 30000
- Calling code: 044
- Website: koratcity.go.th

Nakhon Ratchasima (Thai: นครราชสีมา, pronounced [ná(ʔ).kʰɔ̄ːn râːt.t͡ɕʰá.sǐː.māː]) is the capital of Nakhon Ratchasima province, the largest city in Northeastern Thailand and the third-largest city in Thailand. It is 250 kilometres (160 mi) northeast of Bangkok, one of the four major cities of Isan (Northeast Thailand), known as the "big four of Isan", and has a population of 466,098 people as of 2021. The city is commonly known as Korat (โคราช, pronounced [kʰōː.râːt]), a shortened form of its name.

Korat is at the western edge of the Korat Plateau. Historically, it once marked the boundary between Lao and Siam territory. It is the gateway to the Lao-speaking northeast of Thailand.

== Toponymy ==
Archaeological evidence suggests that in Sung Noen District 32 km west of present-day Nakhon Ratchasima (Korat) there were two ancient towns called Sema ("Bai sema" (ใบเสมา) are notable artifacts of the Korat plateau) and Khorakapura. (Pali púra becomes Sanskrit puri, hence Thai (buri), all connoting the same as Thai mueang: "city with defensive wall".) N The latter name was shortened to Nakhon Raj. (Nakhon (นคร) derives from Sanskrit nagara (नगर), "city"; Raj (ราช), from Sanskrit Raj, "sovereign.") The present city name is a portmanteau of Nakhon Raj and Sema.

The city is commonly known as "Korat" (Thai: โคราช), which is a short version of the ancient Khmer name "ankor raj".

== History ==
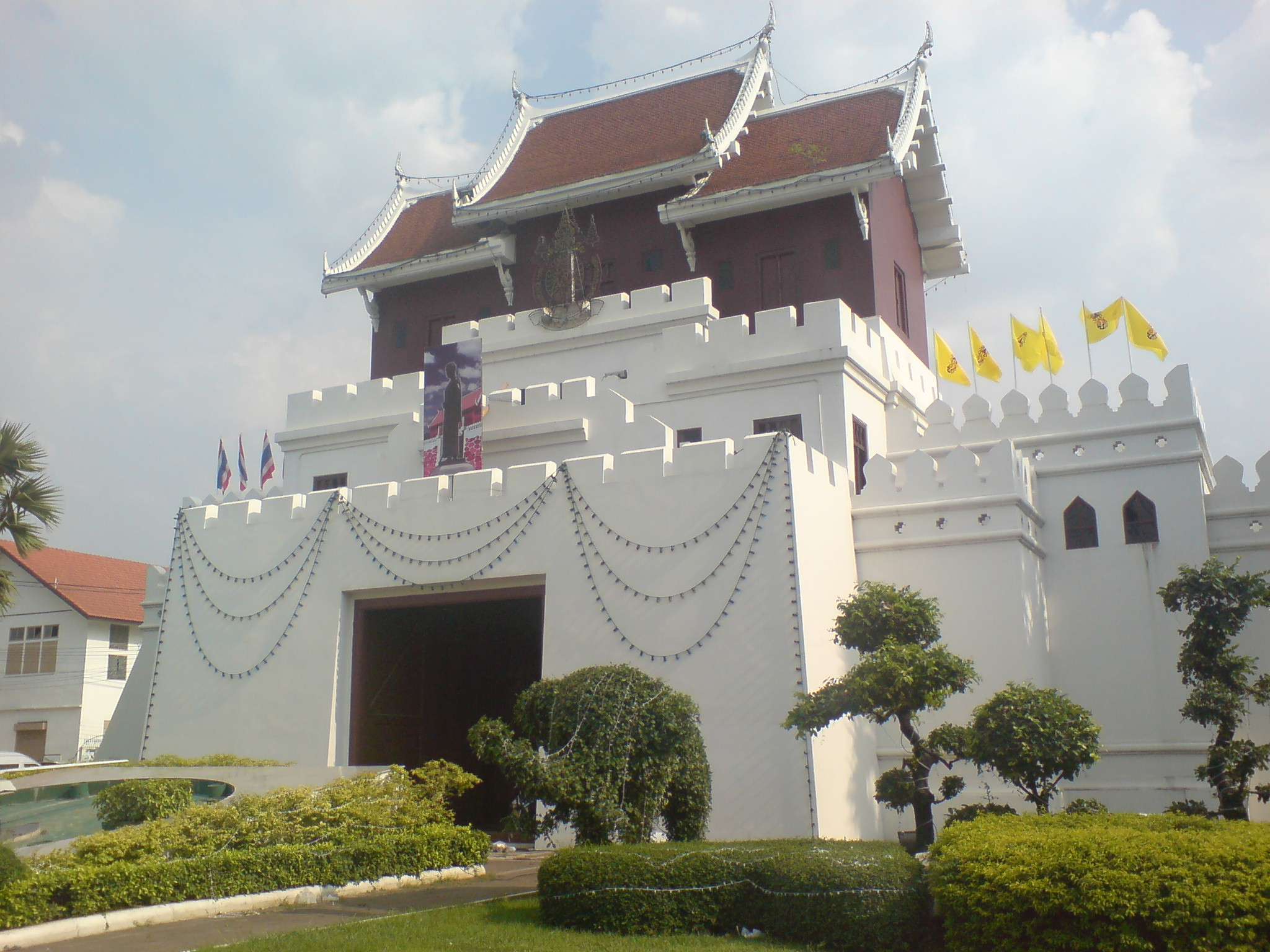
Ya Mo Entrance Gate at the junction of Ratchadamnoen Rd and Hwy 224

Prior to the 14th century, the area of Nakhon Ratchasima was under Khmer empire suzerainty and known in Khmer as Angkor raj, Nokor Reach Seyma, or Nokor Reach Borei, and Koreach. Phimai, to the north, was probably more important.

King Narai of Ayutthaya in the 17th century, ordered a new city built on the site to serve as a stronghold on Ayutthaya's northeastern frontier. Nakhon Ratchasima was thereafter mentioned in Siamese chronicles and legal documents as a "second-class" city of the Ayutthaya Kingdom. A royal governor ruled the city in a hereditary position.

After the final phase of the Ayutthaya kingdom ended with its complete destruction by the Burmese in 1767, a son of King Boromakot attempted to set himself up ruler in Phimai, holding sway over Korat and other eastern provinces. King Taksin of the Thonburi Kingdom (1768–1782) sent two of his generals, brothers Thong Duang and Boonma, to defeat the prince, who was executed in 1768. Thong Duang later became King Rama I of the kingdom, and Korat became his strategic stronghold on the northeastern frontier to supervise the Lao and Khmer tributary states.

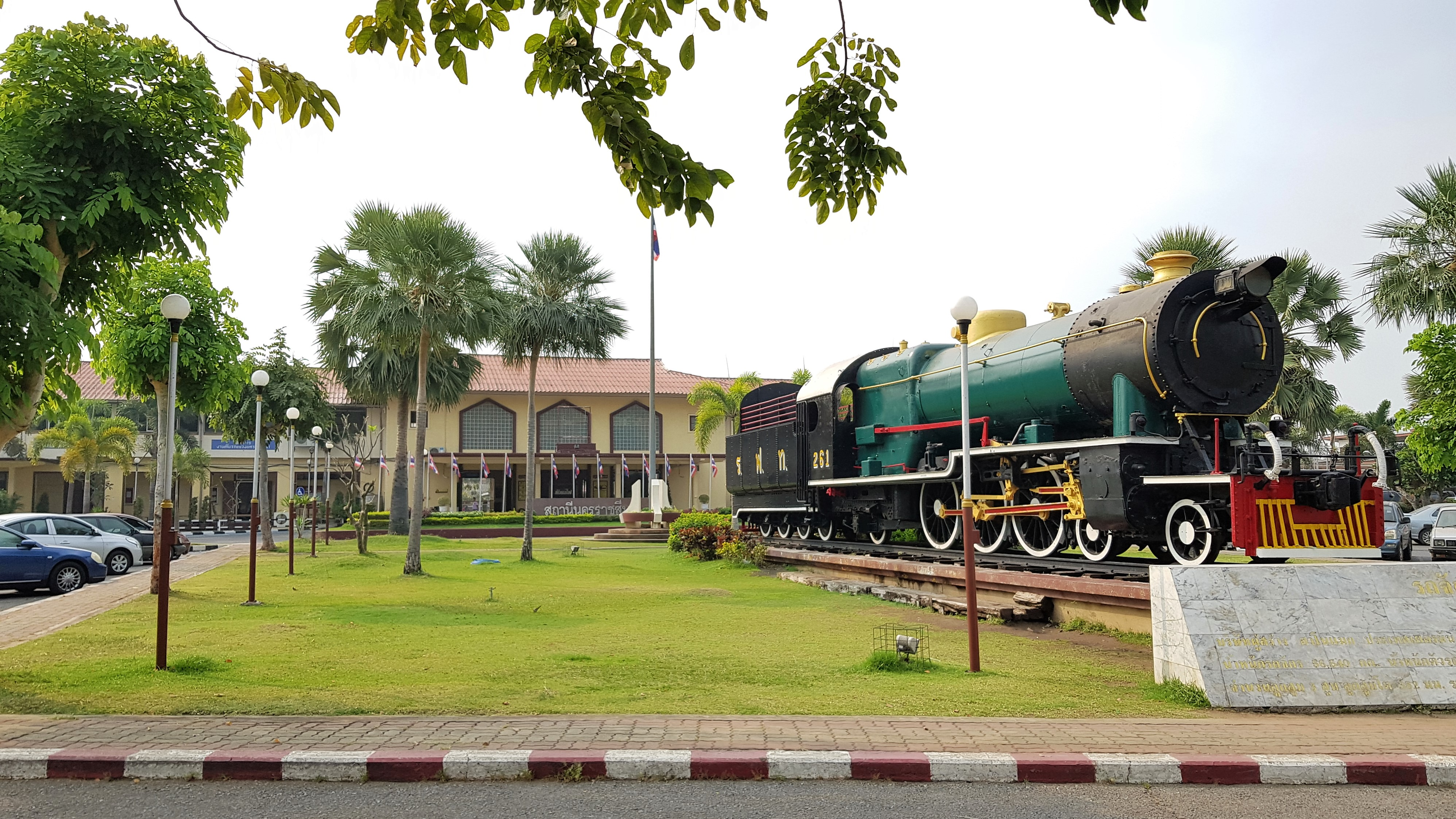
Nakhon Ratchasima Railway Station

In 1826, Vientiane King Chao Anouvong, perceiving Siam as weakened, attacked Korat in the Laotian Rebellion against King Rama III that was to rage on for two years. Lady Mo, the wife of the deputy governor at the time, is credited with having freed the city from Anouvong's army, and has been honored with a statue in the center of downtown Korat. A full account of the war and its impact on Laos and Siam, is detailed in the book, Lady Mo and Heroism at Tung Samrit, written by Frank G Anderson. The city's old wall, east of the monument was designed and built by a French engineer who is believed to be the one who also built Naraimaharaj Palace in Lopburi. The French-based design is reflected in the moat system that surrounds the innermost portion of the city.

Nakhon Ratchasima continued to be an important political and economic center in the northeastern region under the Monthon administrative reforms of the late-19th century. In November 1900, the Royal State Railways of Siam began operation of the Nakhon Ratchasima Line from Bangkok with Korat Station as its terminus. It was officially opened on 21 December 1900 by King Chulalongkorn. The Ubon Ratchathani Line to the town of Warin opened 1 November 1922. The Thanon Chira Junction to Khon Kaen opened on 1 April 1933. Korat station was changed to Nakhon Ratchasima Railway Station in 1934.

In October 1933, after the Siamese revolution of 1932 ended the absolute monarchy, Nakhon Ratchasima became the headquarters of the Boworadet Rebellion, an abortive uprising against the new government in Bangkok.

During World War II, the troops from Nakhon Ratchasima joined the fight in Franco-Thai War, The Thai army was able to temporarily recapture some of the territory. After the war, the United States helped build Mittraphap Road from Saraburi to Nakhon Ratchasima.

In April 1981 during another attempted coup, the government, together with the royal family, took refuge in Korat.

From 1962 to 1976, during the Vietnam War, Korat Royal Thai Air Force Base hosted components of the Royal Thai Air Force, the United States Air Force, and a complement of the Royal New Zealand Air Force (RNZAF). After the US withdrawal in 1976, the Thai Air Force assumed full control. During the 1980s and early 1990s, the airfield was jointly operated as a civil airport for Nakhon Ratchasima. This ended with the opening of Nakhon Ratchasima Airport in the early 1990s.

On 13 August 1993, Thailand's worst disaster happened in the city, the collapse of the Royal Plaza Hotel, killing 137 people.

On 8 and 9 February 2020, Thailand's deadliest shooting at the time occurred in the city, when an offduty Royal Thai Army Sergeant shot 29 people dead and wounded 58 others, mostly at the local Terminal 21 mall, before being killed by responding officers.

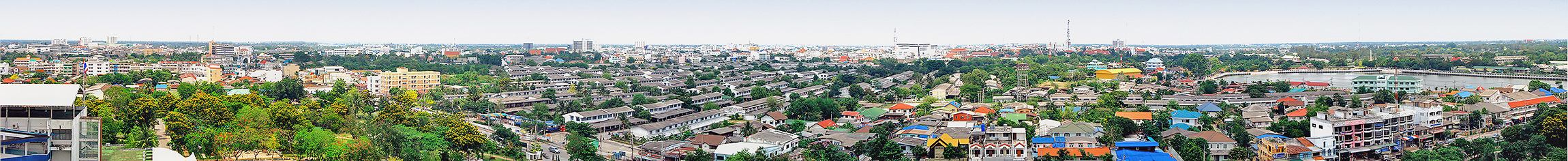
Korat City from Fort Suranaree Hospital

== Demography ==
As of 2019, Nakhon Ratchasima Municipality had a population of 126,391. This number represents only part of the city's current size.

To reflect the population growth since Korat's original designation as a city municipality (thesaban nakhon) in 1995, both the Department of Public Works and Town & Country Planning and the Nakhon Ratchasima Provincial Administrative Organization regularly publish up-to-date city boundaries (Thai: เขตเมือง). These boundaries extend the original municipal borders into adjacent sub-districts, and comprise the whole Capital district of Mueang Nakhon Ratchasima, which forms Korat's urban area. Korat is the third-largest city in Thailand behind Bangkok and Chiang Mai with an urban population of 466,098 as of 2021, which amounts to 17.7 percent of the total population of Nakhon Ratchasima province (2.6 million).

== Administration ==
On 4 January 1908 Pho Klang subdistrict became Nakhon Ratchasima sanitation. The sanitation changed to town municipality (thesaban mueang) on 11 December 1935. On 8 March 1937 the municipality was enlarged to 4.4 km^{2}. and later on 1 January 1983 to 37.5 km^{2} or 5 percent of Mueang Nakhon Ratchasima District. The status was upgraded to city municipality (thesaban nakhon) on 25 September 1995. The administration of the city municipality is responsible for a population of 126,391 registered residents in 71,022 households.

== Climate ==
Nakhon Ratchasima has a tropical savanna climate (Aw in the Köppen climate classification), with the large majority of its rain falling between May and October.

Climate data for Nakhon Ratchasima (1991–2020, extremes 1951-present)
| Month | Jan | Feb | Mar | Apr | May | Jun | Jul | Aug | Sep | Oct | Nov | Dec | Year |
|---|---|---|---|---|---|---|---|---|---|---|---|---|---|
| Record high °C (°F) | 37.7 (99.9) | 40.6 (105.1) | 42.3 (108.1) | 44.0 (111.2) | 42.7 (108.9) | 39.2 (102.6) | 39.2 (102.6) | 37.2 (99.0) | 36.7 (98.1) | 35.1 (95.2) | 36.1 (97.0) | 36.0 (96.8) | 44.0 (111.2) |
| Mean daily maximum °C (°F) | 31.0 (87.8) | 33.5 (92.3) | 35.7 (96.3) | 36.6 (97.9) | 35.4 (95.7) | 34.7 (94.5) | 34.0 (93.2) | 33.3 (91.9) | 32.4 (90.3) | 31.3 (88.3) | 30.9 (87.6) | 29.9 (85.8) | 33.2 (91.8) |
| Daily mean °C (°F) | 24.8 (76.6) | 26.9 (80.4) | 29.2 (84.6) | 30.1 (86.2) | 29.5 (85.1) | 29.3 (84.7) | 28.8 (83.8) | 28.3 (82.9) | 27.6 (81.7) | 27.0 (80.6) | 26.0 (78.8) | 24.4 (75.9) | 27.7 (81.8) |
| Mean daily minimum °C (°F) | 19.2 (66.6) | 21.1 (70.0) | 23.7 (74.7) | 25.1 (77.2) | 25.4 (77.7) | 25.4 (77.7) | 25.0 (77.0) | 24.8 (76.6) | 24.4 (75.9) | 23.6 (74.5) | 21.5 (70.7) | 19.3 (66.7) | 23.2 (73.8) |
| Record low °C (°F) | 4.9 (40.8) | 10.6 (51.1) | 13.0 (55.4) | 16.0 (60.8) | 18.9 (66.0) | 22.0 (71.6) | 21.3 (70.3) | 21.7 (71.1) | 20.4 (68.7) | 16.6 (61.9) | 9.1 (48.4) | 6.2 (43.2) | 4.9 (40.8) |
| Average precipitation mm (inches) | 8.6 (0.34) | 12.7 (0.50) | 46.3 (1.82) | 79.5 (3.13) | 151.7 (5.97) | 120.0 (4.72) | 130.1 (5.12) | 178.0 (7.01) | 238.8 (9.40) | 135.0 (5.31) | 19.6 (0.77) | 2.6 (0.10) | 1,122.9 (44.21) |
| Average precipitation days (≥ 1.0 mm) | 1.0 | 1.3 | 3.7 | 5.7 | 10.5 | 9.2 | 10.1 | 12.5 | 14.4 | 8.9 | 2.0 | 0.5 | 79.8 |
| Average relative humidity (%) | 65.7 | 62.1 | 62.6 | 66.4 | 73.4 | 73.0 | 74.0 | 76.6 | 81.2 | 78.4 | 71.2 | 66.4 | 70.9 |
| Mean monthly sunshine hours | 226.3 | 211.9 | 201.5 | 186.0 | 155.0 | 114.0 | 117.8 | 117.8 | 108.0 | 145.7 | 186.0 | 226.3 | 1,996.3 |
| Mean daily sunshine hours | 7.3 | 7.5 | 6.5 | 6.2 | 5.0 | 3.8 | 3.8 | 3.8 | 3.6 | 4.7 | 6.2 | 7.3 | 5.5 |
Source 1: World Meteorological Organization
Source 2: Office of Water Management and Hydrology, Royal Irrigation Department (sun 1981–2010)(extremes)

== Economy ==
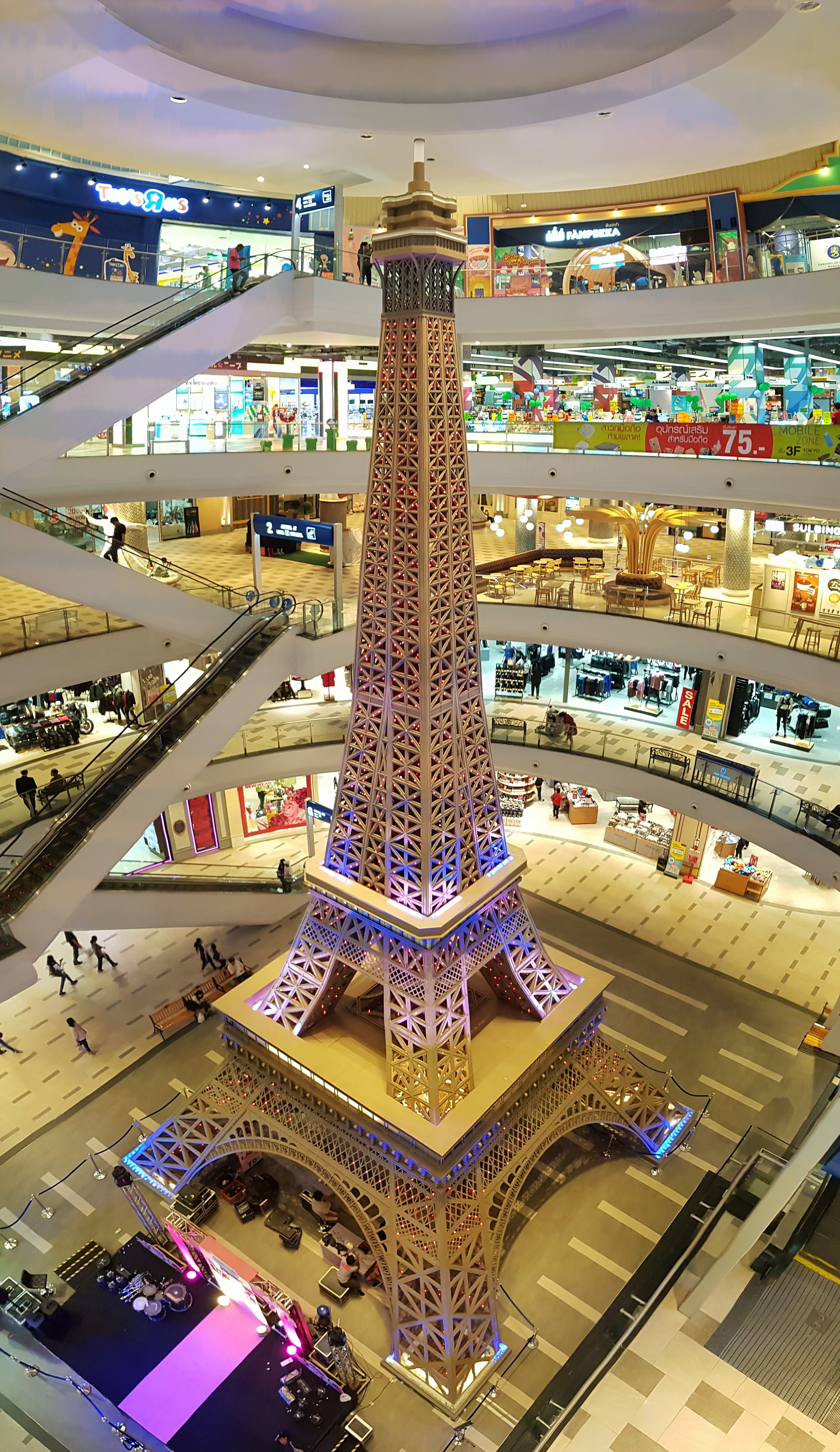
One of the halls inside Terminal 21 Shopping Mall

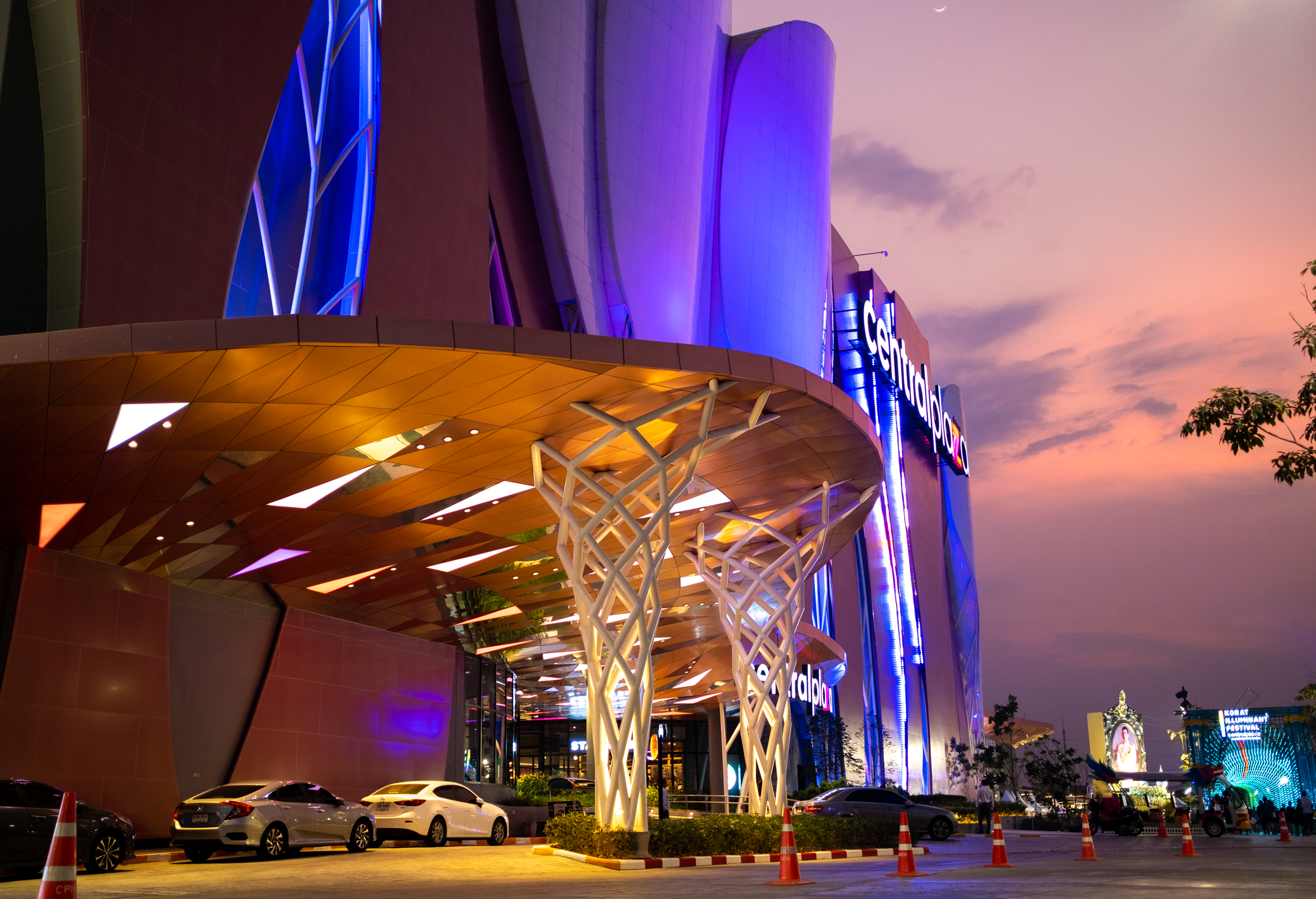
CentralPlaza at sunset

Korat's economy has traditionally been heavily dependent on agriculture. It is known as a processing centre for Isan's production of rice, tapioca, and sugar. The Isan region accounts for half of Thailand's exports of those commodities. Together, these three agricultural commodities employ 700,000 Isan families. Korat is also one of two sites in Thailand manufacturing disk drives by Seagate Technology, employing 12,100 workers in Korat.

=== Retail ===
All three of Thailand's largest Bangkok-based department store chains have invested in expansive outlets in the city, which will provide one million square metres of retail space by late 2017.

== Transport ==
=== Air ===
Nakhon Ratchasima Airport lies 26 kilometres (16 mi) east of the city. There are no scheduled air services operating from the airport.

=== Rail ===
Nakhon Ratchasima is on the northeastern railway line, connecting Bangkok with Ubon Ratchathani and Nong Khai. There are two main railway stations in the city: Nakhon Ratchasima Railway Station on Mukkhamontri Road and Thanon Chira Junction Railway Station on Watcharasarit Road. In 2017, a 60 km (37 mi) dual-track line will connect Korat to Khon Kaen. It is the first segment of a dual track network that will connect Isan with the Laem Chabang seaport. A high-speed rail line to Bangkok is due to open in 2027.

=== Road ===
Passing near the city is Mittraphap Road (Thailand Route 2), the main arterial road that joins Bangkok with the province capitals of Saraburi, Nakhon Ratchasima. Khon Kaen, Udon Thani, and Nong Khai (the major gateway to Laos). A new motorway connecting Korat to Bangkok is under construction in 2016 and will reduce travel time on the 250 km (160 mi) journey to just over two hours.

== Education ==
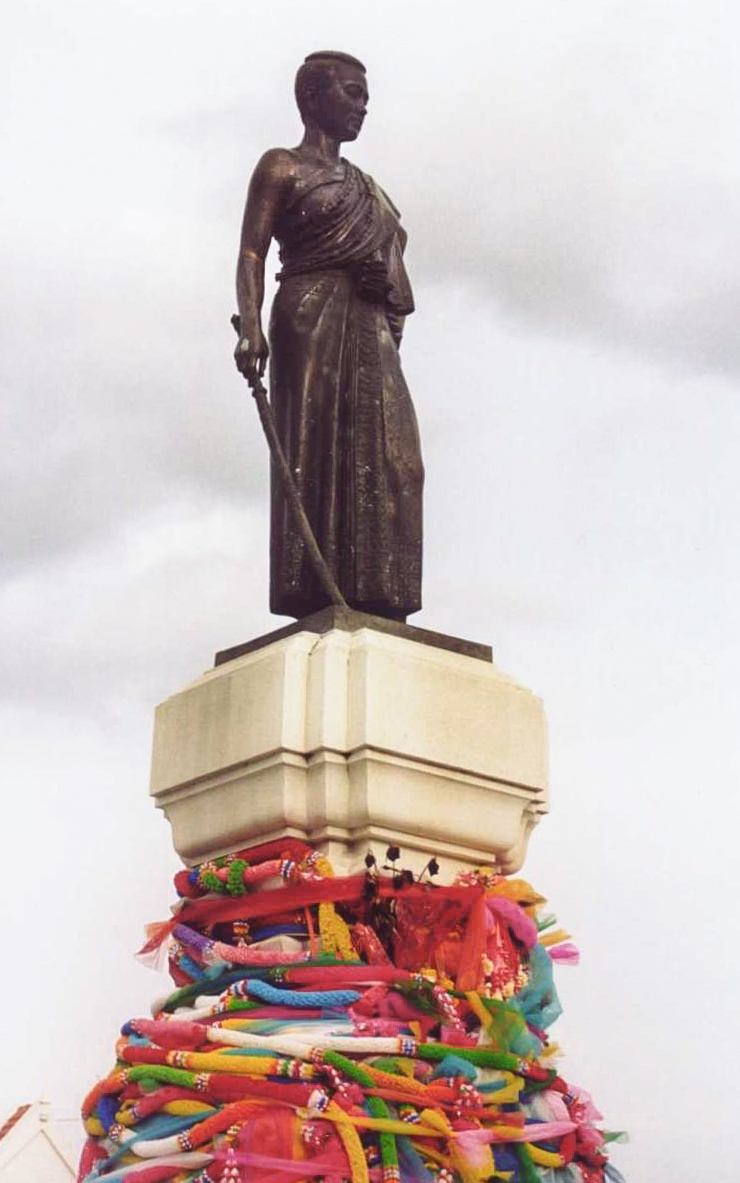
Statue of Lady Mo, Korat city centre

=== Universities ===
There are four universities in the area.

- Suranaree University of Technology
- Nakhon Ratchasima Rajabhat University
- Rajamangala University of Technology Isan
- Vongchavalitkul University

=== Schools ===
- Assumption College Nakhonratchasima
- Boonwattana School
- Boonwattana 2 School
- Bunlua Wittayanusorn School
- Koratpittayakom Nakhon Ratchasima
- Mahitsaratibodee School
- Marie Vitthaya School Nakhon Ratchasima
- Metapaht School
- Nakhon Ratchasima Municipality Sport School
- Ratchasima Wittayalai School
- Sarasas Witaed Nakhon Ratchasima
- Saint Mary Business Administration College
- Suranari Witthaya School
- Suranari Witthaya 2 School
- Surathampitak School
- Surawiwat School
- Triamudomsuksanomklao Nakhon Ratchasima School
- Ubolratana Rajakanya Ratchawittayalai Nakhonratchasima School

=== International schools ===
- Anglo Singapore International School (Korat Campus)
- Korat Montessori
- Notre Dame Nakhon Ratchasima School
- Sarasas Witaed Korat School
- Saint Stephen's International School (Khao Yai Campus)
- Wesley International School

== Hospitals ==
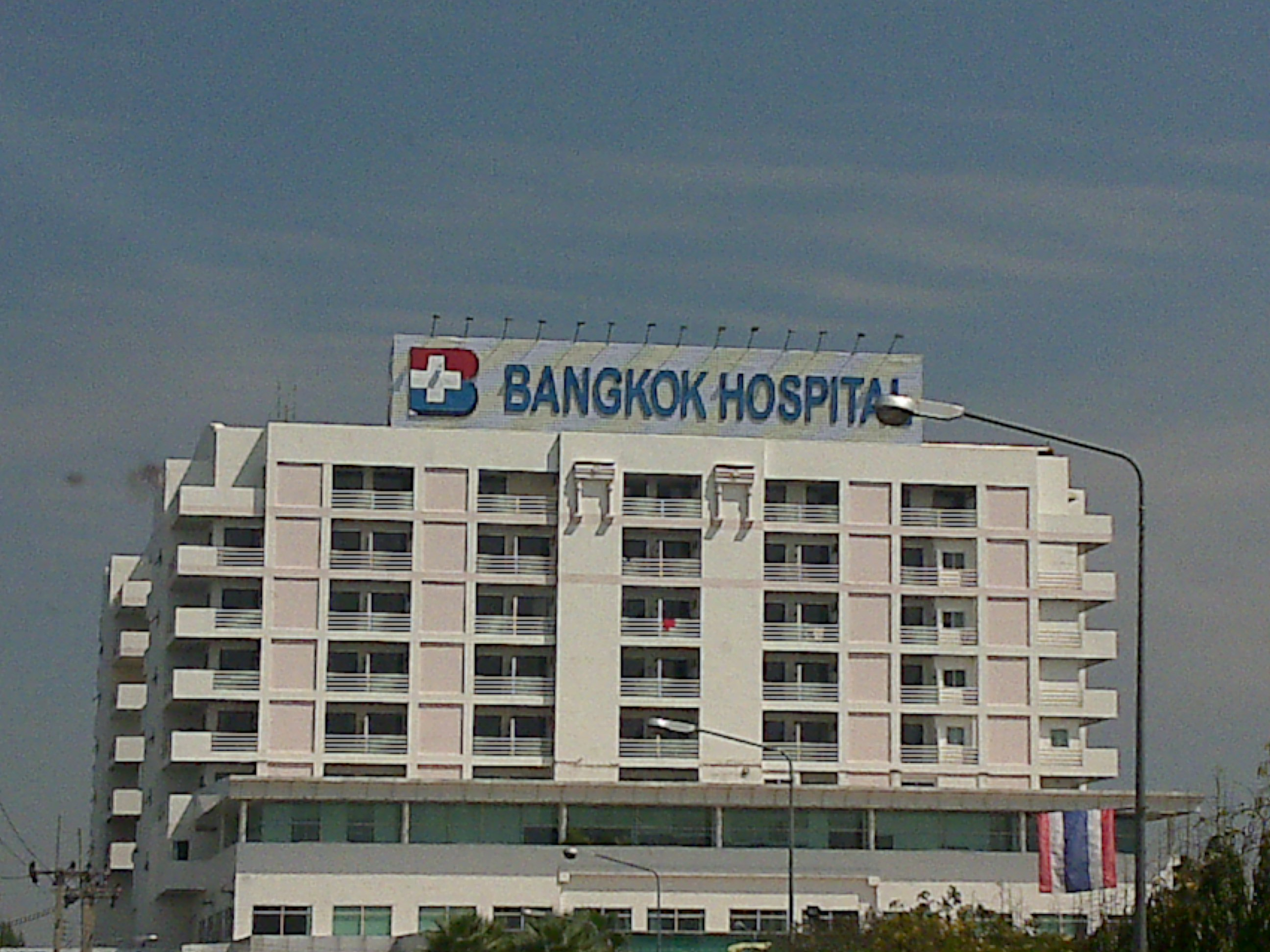
Bangkok-Ratchasima Hospital

- Maharat Nakhon Ratchasima Hospital
- Suranaree University of Technology Hospital
- Fort Suranaree Hospital
- Saint Mary's Hospital
- Korat Memorial Hospital
- Bangkok-Ratchasima Hospital
- Po-Pat Hospital
- Po-Pat 2 Hospital
- The Golden Gate Hospital

== Sports ==
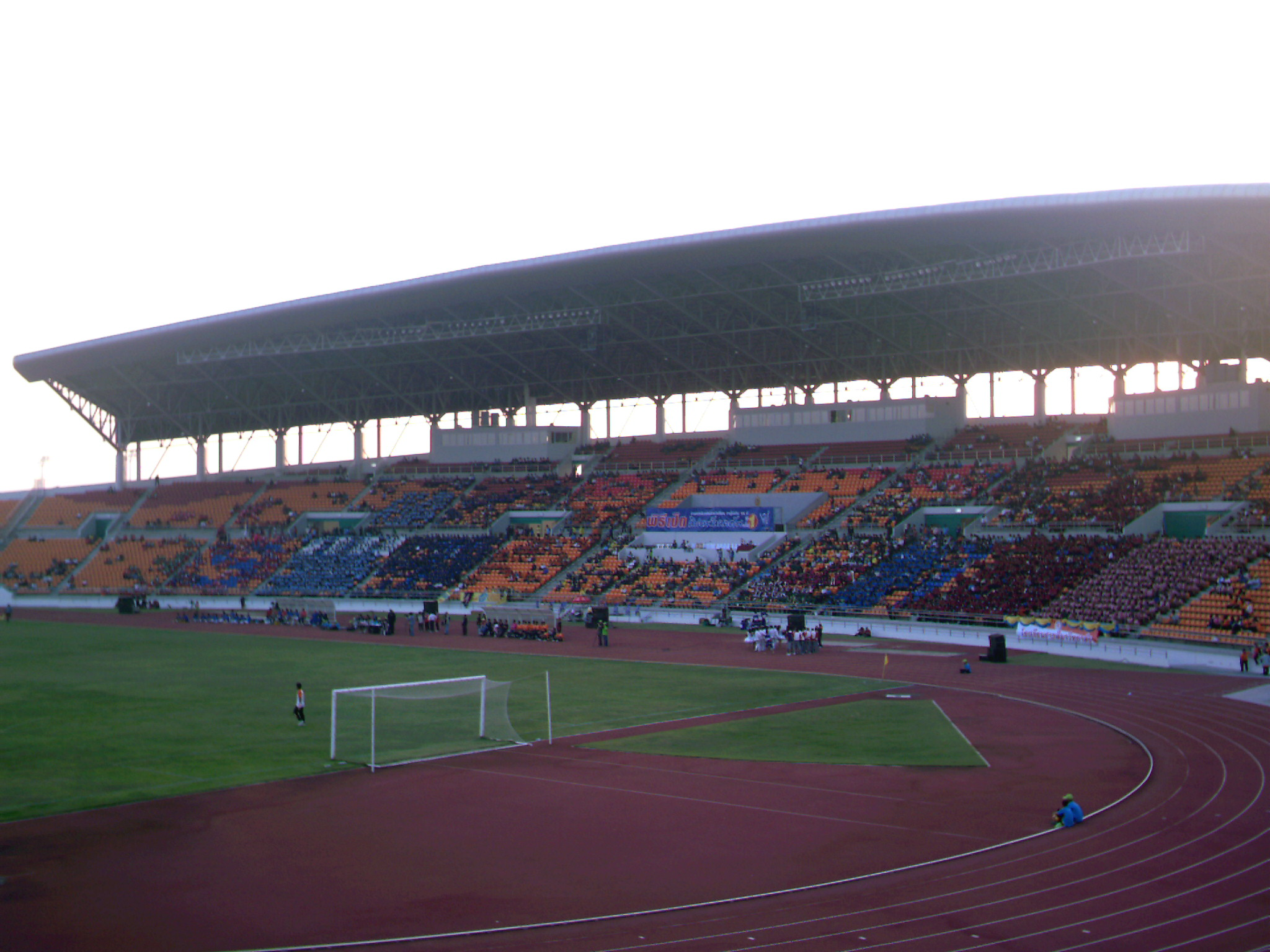
His Majesty the King's 80th Birthday Anniversary, 5 December 2007 Sports Complex

The 80th Birthday Stadium is the main stadium in His Majesty the King's 80th Birthday Anniversary, 5th December 2007 Sports Complex. It is home to Nakhon Ratchasima FC that competes in the national first tier football level, Thailand Premier League and it was used for the 2007 Southeast Asian Games.

The stadium is in the former SEA Games sports complex on Highway 304 (Pak Thong Chai Road) to the southwest of the city. The stadium is all-seats with a capacity of 20,000.

Nakhon Ratchasima is the home of the four-times Men's Volleyball Thailand League winner, Nakhon Ratchasima the Mall and the three-times Women's Volleyball Thailand League winner, Nakhon Ratchasima the Mall. It is also the birthplace of football player Thanayut Kaewjohor.

== See also ==
- List of Cities, Towns and Townships in Nakhon Ratchasima Province
