= Mai, Nakhon Ratchasima =

Mai (Thai: เทศบาลตำบลใหม่) is a subdistrict municipality in Non Sung District, Nakhon Ratchasima Province. It was created as a Tambon Administrative Organization (TAO) was in 1996, and upgraded to a municipality in 2008. It covers the complete subdistrict Mai, an area of 66.46 km^{2} (25.66 sq mi) in 16 villages with 12,746 citizens.
