= Nong Hua Raet =

Coordinates: 14.718603°N 102.333857°E

Nong Hua Raet หนองหัวแรต
- Subdistrict municipality
- Interactive map of Nong Hua Raet
- Country: Thailand
- Province: Nakhon Ratchasima
- District: Nong Bun Mak District
- Time zone: UTC+7 (ICT)

Nong Hua Raet (Thai: หนองหัวแรต) is a subdistrict municipality (thesaban tambon) in the Nong Bun Mak District of Nakhon Ratchasima Province, Thailand. It was created as subdistrict administrative organization in 1996 and upgraded to a municipality in 2008. It covers 93.99 km^{2}, 15 villages, and 8,265 citizens.
