= Chok Chai district =

Chok Chai โชคชัย
- District
- District location in Nakhon Ratchasima province
- Coordinates: 14°43′56″N 102°9′47″E
- Country: Thailand
- Province: Nakhon Ratchasima
- Seat: Chok Chai

Area
  - Total: 503.9 km^{2} (194.6 sq mi)

Population (2015)
  - Total: 81,632
  - Density: 146.2/km^{2} (379/sq mi)
- Time zone: UTC+7 (ICT)
- Postal code: 30190
- Geocode: 3007

Chok Chai (Thai: โชคชัย, pronounced [tɕʰôːk tɕʰāj]; Northeastern Thai: โชคชัย, pronounced [sôːk sa᷇j]) is a district (amphoe) in Nakhon Ratchasima province, northeastern Thailand.

== History ==
The district was originally named Krathok (กระโทก). The government renamed it Chok Chai (meaning 'lucky victory') in 1945. The name was chosen to commemorate the victory of King Taksin the Great over the warlord of Phimai after the fall of Ayutthaya.

== Geography ==
Neighboring districts are (from the north clockwise): Mueang Nakhon Ratchasima, Chaloem Phra Kiat, Nong Bun Mak, Khon Buri and Pak Thong Chai.

== Administration ==
=== Central administration ===
Chok Chai is divided into 10 sub-districts (tambons), which are further subdivided into 132 administrative villages (mubans).

No.	Name	Thai	Villages	Pop.
1.	Krathok	กระโทก	13	7,629
2.	Phlapphla	พลับพลา	18	8,321
3.	Tha Ang	ท่าอ่าง	10	8,311
4.	Thung Arun	ทุ่งอรุณ	17	8,055
5.	Tha Lat Khao	ท่าลาดขาว	11	4,038
6.	Tha Chalung	ท่าจะหลุง	10	5,096
7.	Tha Yiam	ท่าเยี่ยม	16	10,853
8.	Chok Chai	โชคชัย	15	13,862
9.	Lalom Mai Phatthana	ละลมใหม่พัฒนา	12	6,537
10.	Dan Kwian	ด่านเกวียน	10	8,930

=== Local administration ===
There are three sub-district municipalities (thesaban tambons) in the district:

- Chok Chai (Thai: เทศบาลตำบลโชคชัย) consisting of parts of sub-districts Krathok and Chok Chai.
- Dan Kwian (Thai: เทศบาลตำบลด่านเกวียน) consisting of parts of sub-districts Tha Ang and Dan Kwian.
- Tha Yiam (Thai: เทศบาลตำบลท่าเยี่ยม) consisting of sub-district Tha Yiam.

There are nine sub-district administrative organizations (SAO) in the district:

- Krathok (Thai: องค์การบริหารส่วนตำบลกระโทก) consisting of parts of sub-district Krathok.
- Phlapphla (Thai: องค์การบริหารส่วนตำบลพลับพลา) consisting of sub-district Phlapphla.
- Tha Ang (Thai: องค์การบริหารส่วนตำบลท่าอ่าง) consisting of parts of sub-district Tha Ang.
- Thung Arun (Thai: องค์การบริหารส่วนตำบลทุ่งอรุณ) consisting of sub-district Thung Arun.
- Tha Lat Khao (Thai: องค์การบริหารส่วนตำบลท่าลาดขาว) consisting of sub-district Tha Lat Khao.
- Tha Chalung (Thai: องค์การบริหารส่วนตำบลท่าจะหลุง) consisting of sub-district Tha Chalung.
- Chok Chai (Thai: องค์การบริหารส่วนตำบลโชคชัย) consisting of parts of sub-district Chok Chai.
- Lalom Mai Phatthana (Thai: องค์การบริหารส่วนตำบลละลมใหม่พัฒนา) consisting of the sub-district Lalom Mai Phatthana.
- Dan Kwian (Thai: องค์การบริหารส่วนตำบลด่านเกวียน) consisting of parts of the sub-district Dan Kwian.

== Climate ==
Climate data for Chok Chai (1991–2020, extremes 1970-present)
Month	Jan	Feb	Mar	Apr	May	Jun	Jul	Aug	Sep	Oct	Nov	Dec	Year
Record high °C (°F)	37.1 (98.8)	39.0 (102.2)	41.2 (106.2)	43.1 (109.6)	42.2 (108.0)	38.5 (101.3)	38.5 (101.3)	37.5 (99.5)	36.7 (98.1)	35.1 (95.2)	36.5 (97.7)	35.8 (96.4)	43.1 (109.6)
Mean daily maximum °C (°F)	31.4 (88.5)	33.6 (92.5)	35.5 (95.9)	36.2 (97.2)	35.1 (95.2)	34.3 (93.7)	33.5 (92.3)	33.1 (91.6)	32.3 (90.1)	31.4 (88.5)	31.0 (87.8)	30.2 (86.4)	33.1 (91.6)
Daily mean °C (°F)	24.5 (76.1)	26.6 (79.9)	28.8 (83.8)	29.7 (85.5)	29.1 (84.4)	28.9 (84.0)	28.4 (83.1)	28.0 (82.4)	27.4 (81.3)	26.8 (80.2)	25.6 (78.1)	24.0 (75.2)	27.3 (81.2)
Mean daily minimum °C (°F)	18.3 (64.9)	20.3 (68.5)	23.1 (73.6)	24.6 (76.3)	25.1 (77.2)	25.1 (77.2)	24.7 (76.5)	24.5 (76.1)	24.1 (75.4)	23.2 (73.8)	20.9 (69.6)	18.4 (65.1)	22.7 (72.9)
Record low °C (°F)	7.2 (45.0)	10.3 (50.5)	11.7 (53.1)	15.5 (59.9)	18.2 (64.8)	21.6 (70.9)	20.4 (68.7)	21.1 (70.0)	20.2 (68.4)	16.1 (61.0)	9.7 (49.5)	6.5 (43.7)	6.5 (43.7)
Average precipitation mm (inches)	8.7 (0.34)	12.8 (0.50)	36.7 (1.44)	74.6 (2.94)	148.8 (5.86)	110.9 (4.37)	120.4 (4.74)	150.5 (5.93)	204.4 (8.05)	159.7 (6.29)	23.9 (0.94)	3.9 (0.15)	1,055.3 (41.55)
Average precipitation days (≥ 1.0 mm)	0.7	1.3	3.2	5.3	10.9	9.3	10.5	12.5	14.5	10.6	2.4	0.6	81.8
Average relative humidity (%)	67.5	64.4	64.8	68.5	75.1	74.5	75.4	77.4	82.0	80.7	74.6	69.8	72.9
Source: World Meteorological Organization, Meteomanz (record), (extremes)
