= Nong Nam Sai, Sikhio =

Coordinates: 14.925762°N 101.484083°E

Nong Nam Sai (หนองน้ำใส) is a sub-district, (Tambon), in the Sikhio District of Nakhon Ratchasima Province, Thailand. It was created in 1996, and covers 101 km^{2}, 18 villages, and 12,443 citizens.
