= Dan Khla =

Coordinates: 15.1513846°N 102.21373°E

Dan Khla (Thai: เทศบาลตำบลด่านคล้า) is a sub-district municipality of Non Sung District, Nakhon Ratchasima Province, Thailand. It was created as a TAO in 1996 and upgraded to a municipality in 2008. It covers 29 km^{2}, 14 villages and 8,567 citizens.
