= Mueang Yang =

Subdistrict of Mueang Yang district, Nakhon Ratchasima, Thailand

Mueang Yang (Thai: ตำบลเมืองยาง) is a subdistrict (Tambon) in the Mueang Yang district of Nakhon Ratchasima Province, Thailand. It covers 68.54 km^{2} (26.46 sq mi), contains 12 villages and 8,131 citizens. The whole area of the subdistrict is covered by the subdistrict municipality (Thesaban Tambon) of Mueang Yang (เทศบาลตำบลเมืองยาง). The subdistrict administrative organization (SAO) of Mueang Yang was created in 1996.
