= Nok Ok =

Coordinates: 14.6811°N 102.0222°E

Nok Ok นกออก
- Tambon
- Interactive map of Nok Ok
- Country: Thailand
- Province: Nakhon Ratchasima
- District: Pak Thong Chai District

Area
  - Total: 60 km^{2} (23 sq mi)

Population (2008)
  - Total: 6,026
  - Density: 100/km^{2} (260/sq mi)
- Time zone: UTC+7 (ICT)
- Postal Code: 30150
- Geocode: 301406

Nok Ok (Thai: นกออก) is a subdistrict (tambon) and a subdistrict municipality (thesaban tambon) in Pak Thong Chai District, Nakhon Ratchasima Province, Thailand.

== Geography ==
Neighboring subdistricts are (from the north clockwise): Mueang Pak, Don, Kaem Sap, Sakae Rat, and Ngio.

== History ==
While the subdistrict (tambon) Nok Ok is much older, the Tambon administrative organization (TAO) as the local administration unit was established in 1996. Effective June 30, 2008 it was upgraded to a subdistrict municipality.

== Administration ==
The subdistrict is divided into 10 administrative villages (muban).

1	บ้านบุโกรก	Ban Bu Krok
2	บ้านพระเพลิง	Ban Phra Phloeng
3	บ้านโคกสระน้อย	Ban Khok Sa Noi
4	บ้านสระน้อย	Ban Sa Noi
5	บ้านนกออก	Ban Nok Ok
6	บ้านทุ่งจาน	Ban Thung Chan
7	บ้านท่าน้ำซับ	Ban Tha Nam Chap
8	บ้านปรางค์	Ban Prang
9	บ้านนกออก	Ban Nok Ok
