= Laem Thong =

Laem Thong (Thai: เทศบาลตำบลแหลมทอง) is a subdistrict municipality (Thesaban Tambon) in Nong Bun Mak District, Nakhon Ratchasima Province, Thailand. It became a municipality on July 18, 2008. The TAO was established in 1996 and covers an area of 69.22 km^{2}, consisting of ten villages and a population of 5,667 residents.
