= Doi Ngam =

Doi Ngam ดอยงาม
- Tambon
- Interactive map of Doi Ngam
- Coordinates: 19°32′36″N 99°49′3″E
- Country: Thailand
- Province: Chiang Rai
- District: Phan

Population (2014)
  - Total: 6,263
- Time zone: UTC+7 (ICT)
- Postal code: 57120
- TIS 1099: 570505

Doi Ngam (Thai: ดอยงาม) is a tambon (subdistrict) of Phan District, in Chiang Rai Province, Thailand. In 2014, it had a population of 6,263 people.

== Administration ==
=== Central administration ===
The tambon is subdivided into 14 administrative villages (muban).

No.	Name	Thai
1.	Ban San Sai	บ้านสันทราย
2.	Ban Cham Khao Thong	บ้านจำคาวตอง
3.	Ban San Phak Hueat	บ้านสันผักเฮือด
4.	Ban San Nong Khwai	บ้านสันหนองควาย
5.	Ban Tha Dok Kaeo	บ้านท่าดอกแก้ว
6.	Ban San Makok	บ้านสันมะกอก
7.	Ban San Chang Tai	บ้านสันช้างตาย
8.	Ban Nong Mot	บ้านหนองหมด
9.	Ban San Kamphaeng	บ้านสันกำแพง
10.	Ban San That	บ้านสันธาตุ
11.	Ban San Khong	บ้านสันโค้ง
12.	Ban Pa Tueng	บ้านป่าตึง
13.	Ban Mae Nat	บ้านแม่หนาด
14.	Ban Saraphi	บ้านสารภี

=== Local administration ===
The area of the subdistrict is covered by the subdistrict administrative organization (SAO) Doi Ngam (องค์การบริหารส่วนตำบลดอยงาม)
