= Pak Thong Chai =

Coordinates: 14°43′N 102°01′E

Pak Thong Chai (เทศบาลตำบลปักธงชัย), is a tambon (TAO) in Pak Thong Chai District, Nakhon Ratchasima Province, established on 16 July 2008. The TAO was originally named Mueang Pak (เมืองปัก) and was renamed together with the upgrade, as the central part of the subdistrict already forms a sub-district municipality named Mueang Pak. The TAO was created in 1996, covers 17.92 km^{2}, seven villages and 4,304 citizens.
