= Sikhio district =

Sikhio สีคิ้ว
- District
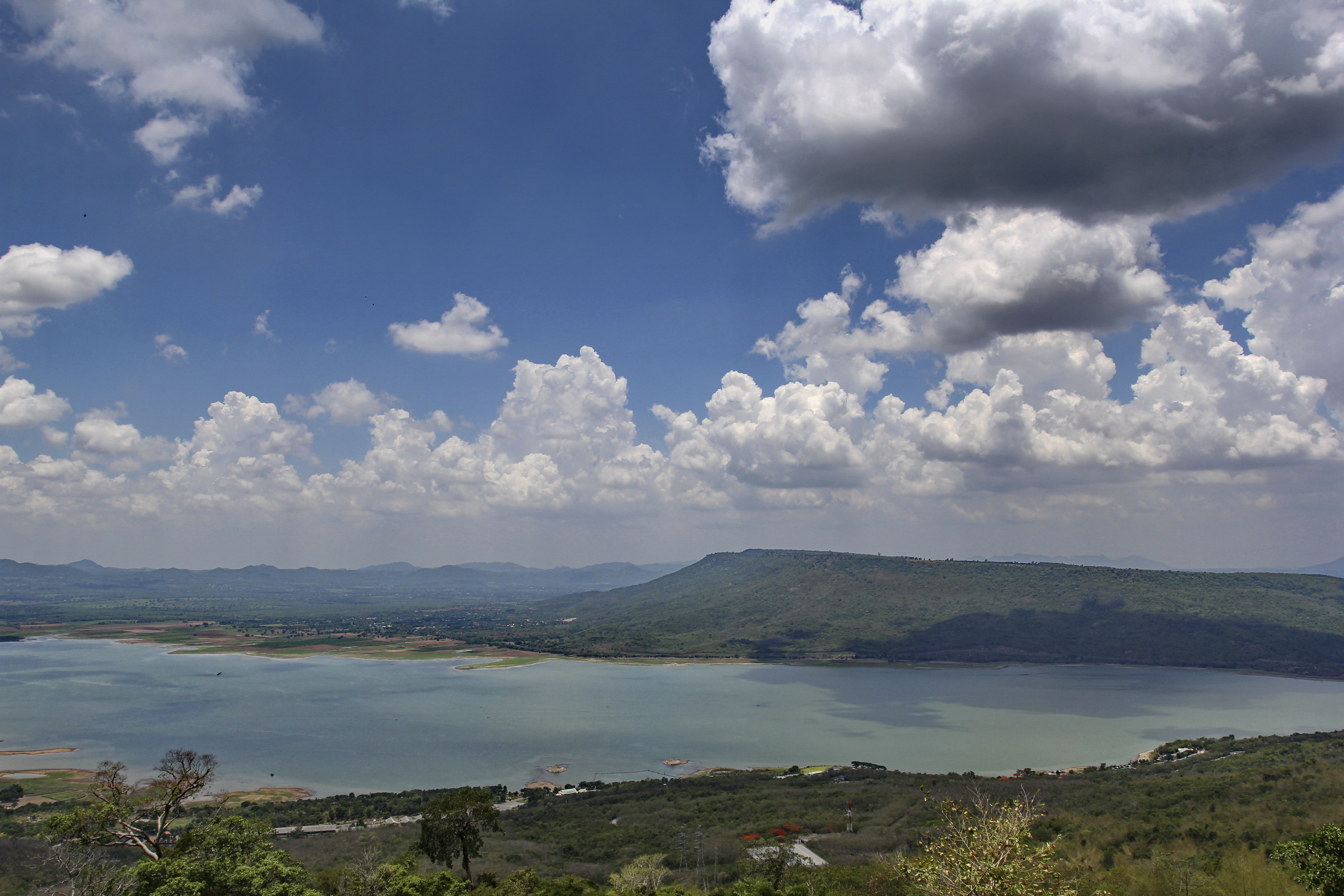
- Lam Takhong Dam, Sikhio

- District location in Nakhon Ratchasima province
- Coordinates: 14°53′30″N 101°43′24″E
- Country: Thailand
- Province: Nakhon Ratchasima
- Seat: Sikhio

Area
  - Total: 1,247.068 km^{2} (481.496 sq mi)

Population (2005)
  - Total: 121,356
  - Density: 97.3/km^{2} (252/sq mi)
- Time zone: UTC+7 (ICT)
- Postal code: 30140, 30340
- Geocode: 3020

Sikhio (Thai: สีคิ้ว, pronounced [sǐː.kʰíw]; Northeastern Thai: สีคิ้ว, pronounced [sǐː.kʰȉw]) is a district (amphoe) in the western part of Nakhon Ratchasima province, Thailand.

== History ==
Originally known as Mueang Nakhon Chantuek, Sikhio is an ancient frontier city between the Thai-dominated Chao Phraya valley and the Lao-dominated Khorat Plateau. Nakhon Chantuek was controlled directly by the central government of Siam. On 1 April 1898, it became a subordinate mueang of Nakhon Ratchasima. The district office was moved to Ban Nong Bua in 1901, and moved again to Ban Sikhio in 1906, both times because the original location was malaria infected. In 1939, the district was renamed from Chanthuek to Sikhio.

Sikhio has been a human settlement for a long time. There is evidence as paintings on the cave walls on local hill, Khao Chan Ngam. 4,000 years old ancient paintings, the only one in Nakhon Ratchasima province. Even after 4,000 years, they are still coloured and clearly visible. The painters used the mixture of soil and tree resin to pain these works. There are some paintings too but the colour is quite faded. It is assumed that these paintings to be drafted or painted from hematite ore. It gives red colour when being mixed with tree resin. The paintings were painted on the wall of a cave in late prehistoric period.

== Geography ==
The district is in the Dong Phaya Yen mountain range. Neighbouring districts are (from the north clockwise): Dan Khun Thot, Sung Noen, and Pak Chong of Nakhon Ratchasima; Muak Lek of Saraburi province; and Lam Sonthi of Lopburi province.

== Administration ==
The district is divided into 12 sub-districts (tambons), which are further subdivided into 170 villages (mubans). The town (thesaban mueang) Sikhio covers parts of tambons Sikhio and Mittraphap. There are another four sub-district municipalities (thesaban tambons), Lad Bua Khao covering parts of tambon Lad Bua Khao, and Khlong Phai covering parts of tambon Khlong Phai, Mueang Sikhio. Those parts of tambon Sikhio not covered by the town Sikhio, and Nong Nam Sai the full same-named sub-district. There are another 10 tambon administrative organizations (TAO).

No.	Name	Thai name	Villages	Pop.
1.	Sikhio	สีคิ้ว	18	17,750
2.	Ban Han	บ้านหัน	11	4,479
3.	Kritsana	กฤษณา	12	6,681
4.	Lat Bua Khao	ลาดบัวขาว	17	19,907
5.	Nong Ya Khao	หนองหญ้าขาว	15	9,104
6.	Kut Noi	กุดน้อย	14	7,536
7.	Nong Nam Sai	หนองน้ำใส	18	12,429
8.	Wang Rong Yai	วังโรงใหญ่	14	7,518
9.	Mittraphap	มิตรภาพ	13	13,380
10.	Khlong Phai	คลองไผ่	10	9,353
11.	Don Mueang	ดอนเมือง	16	6,998
12.	Nong Bua Noi	หนองบัวน้อย	12	6,221
