= Don Wai =

Don Wai (Thai: เทศบาลตำบลดอนหวาย) is a subdistrict municipality (Thesaban Tambon), Non Sung District, Nakhon Ratchasima Province, Thailand. It became a municipality effective February 28, 2008. The TAO was created 1999, covers 20.49 km^{2}, seven villages, and has a population of 3,440.
