= Khok Sung, Nakhon Ratchasima =

Coordinates: 15°04′34″N 102°07′10″E

Khok Sung (Thai: โคกสูง) is a subdistrict (tambon) and subdistrict municipality (thesaban tambon) in Mueang Nakhon Ratchasima District of Nakhon Ratchasima Province, Thailand. The municipality was upgraded from subdistrict administration organization (TAO) status on July 1, 2008. The TAO was created in 1996. It covers 30.46 km^{2}, and consists of 11 villages with 9,235 citizens.
