= Ho Kham municipality =

Thai municipality

Coordinates: 18°26′03″N 103°26′06″E

Ho Kham (Thai: เทศบาลตำบลหอคำ) is a subdistrict municipality (Thesaban Tambon) in Mueang Bueng Kan District, Bueng Kan Province, Thailand. The municipality covers the whole subdistrict Ho Kham. It covers an area of 40.04 km^{2} and 14 administrative villages. As of 2012, it has a total population of 7,116 people.

== History ==
The local administration was created as a subdistrict administrative organization (TAO) in 1996. Effective July 18, 2008 it was upgraded to a subdistrict municipality.
