= Pak Thong Chai district =

District of Thailand

Pak Thong Chai ปักธงชัย
- District
- District location in Nakhon Ratchasima province
- Coordinates: 14°43′11″N 102°1′17″E
- Country: Thailand
- Province: Nakhon Ratchasima
- Seat: Mueang Pak

Area
  - Total: 1,374.3 km^{2} (530.6 sq mi)

Population (2007)
  - Total: 115,244
  - Density: 83.9/km^{2} (217/sq mi)
- Time zone: UTC+7 (ICT)
- Postal code: 30150
- Geocode: 3014

Pak Thong Chai (Thai: ปักธงชัย, pronounced [pàk tʰōŋ tɕʰāj]; Northeastern Thai: ปักธงชัย, pronounced [pǎk tʰôŋ sâj]) is a district (amphoe) in the southern part of Nakhon Ratchasima province, northeastern Thailand.

== History ==
The area was an important city in the Khmer era, controlled by Mueang Phimai. In the reign of King U Thong of Ayutthaya it was named Mueang Pak. When King Narai the Great built Mueang Nakhon Ratchasima as the northeastern frontier city of Ayutthaya, Mueang Pak was a frontier city of Nakhon Ratchasima, then called Dan Chapo (ด่านจะโปะ). King Taksin the Great changed the name of the city to Pak Thong Chai and set aside this area for Lao people from Vientiane kingdom. He promoted Phia Upparacha of Vientiane to be Phraya Wongsa Akkharat (พระยาวงษาอรรคราช), the governor of Pak Thong Chai.

King Chulalongkorn (Rama V) changed the city status to a district (amphoe) in 1908 as part of the thesaphiban administrative reforms.

== Geography ==
Neighboring districts are (from the north clockwise): Sung Noen, Mueang Nakhon Ratchasima, Chok Chai, Khon Buri, and Wang Nam Khiao.

== Administration ==
The district is divided into 16 sub-districts (tambons), which are further subdivided into 215 villages (mubans). There are six sub-district municipalities (thesaban tambons): Mueang Pak, covering parts of tambons Mueang Pak and Thong Chai Nuea; Pak Thong Chai, part of tambon Pak Thong Chai; and Takhop covering part of tambon Takhop; Nok Ok, Lam Nang Kaeo, and Bo Pla Thong, and Nok Ok, Lam Nang Kaeo, and Bo Pla Thong each cover parts of the same-named tambons.

No.	Name	Thai	Pop.
1.	Mueang Pak	เมืองปัก	18,515
2.	Takhu	ตะคุ	12,224
3.	Khok Thai	โคกไทย	4,577
4.	Samrong	สำโรง	3,445
5.	Takhop	ตะขบ	14,214
6.	Nok Ok	นกออก	6,083
7.	Don	ดอน	4,279
9.	Tum	ตูม	5,476
10.	Ngio	งิ้ว	6,514
11.	Sakae Rat	สะแกราช	8,787
12.	Lam Nang Kaeo	ลำนางแก้ว	5,020
16.	Phu Luang	ภูหลวง	5,384
17.	Thong Chai Nuea	ธงชัยเหนือ	8,362
18.	Suk Kasem	สุขเกษม	4,732
19.	Kasem Sap	เกษมทรัพย์	3,535
20.	Bo Pla Thong	บ่อปลาทอง	4,097

Missing numbers correspond to tambons which now form Wang Nam Khiao District.

== Economy ==
Pak Thong Chai is famous for producing high quality silk. The people of Pak Thong Chai weaved silk and sold it to Jim Thompson, an American merchant who was well known for promoting Thai silk to be popular and internationally famous for a long time.
