= Non Sung district =

Non Sung โนนสูง
- District
- District location in Nakhon Ratchasima province
- Coordinates: 15°10′48″N 102°15′25″E
- Country: Thailand
- Province: Nakhon Ratchasima
- Seat: Non Sung

Area
  - Total: 677.0 km^{2} (261.4 sq mi)

Population (2012)
  - Total: 127,178
  - Density: 187.9/km^{2} (487/sq mi)
- Time zone: UTC+7 (ICT)
- Postal code: 30160, 30420
- Geocode: 3010

Non Sung (Thai: โนนสูง, pronounced [nōːn sǔːŋ]; Northeastern Thai: โนนสูง, pronounced [nôːn sǔːŋ]) is a district (amphoe) in the central part of Nakhon Ratchasima province, northeastern Thailand.

== Etymology ==
The old name of the district was Klang. The word klang in Thai means 'middle', which refers to the location of the district between the Nok District (now Bua Yai District) and Nai District (Mueang Nakhon Ratchasima District).

When Thai people had to choose a family name at the beginning of the 20th century, many of the locals created names with the word klang.

== History ==
The district's name was changed from Non Wat to Non Sung in 1939.

== Geography ==
Neighbouring districts are (from the north clockwise) Khong, Phimai, Chakkarat, Chaloem Phra Kiat, Mueang Nakhon Ratchasima, Non Thai, and Kham Sakaesaeng.

Ban Non Wat, a village in the district, is an important Bronze Age archaeological site.

== Administration ==
The district is divided into 16 sub-districts (tambons). There are seven townships (thesaban tambons) within the district: Non Sung covers tambon Non Sung; Talat Khae covers parts of tambon Than Prasat; Don Wai covers tambon Don Wai; Makha covers tambon Makha; Dan Khla covers tambon Dan Khla; Mai covers tambon Mai; and Ho Kham covers tambon Ho Kham.

1.	Non Sung	โนนสูง
2.	Mai	ใหม่
3.	Tanot	โตนด
4.	Bing	บิง
5.	Don Chomphu	ดอนชมพู
6.	Than Prasat	ธารปราสาท
7.	Lum Khao	หลุมข้าว
8.	Makha	มะค่า
9.	Phon Songkhram	พลสงคราม
10.	Chan-at	จันอัด
11.	Kham Thao	ขามเฒ่า
12.	Dan Khla	ด่านคล้า
13.	Lam Kho Hong	ลำคอหงษ์
14.	Mueang Prasat	เมืองปราสาท
15.	Don Wai	ดอนหวาย
16.	Lam Mun	ลำมูล
