= Chok Chai =

Coordinates: 14°44′N 102°10′E

Chok Chai โชคชัย
- Subdistrict
- Interactive map of Chok Chai
- Country: Thailand
- Province: Chiang Rai
- District: Doi Luang

Population (2005)
  - Total: 8,793
- Time zone: UTC+7 (ICT)

Chok Chai (Thai: โชคชัย) is a village and tambon (sub-district) of Doi Luang District, in Chiang Rai Province, Thailand. In 2005 it had a population of 8,793 people. The tambon contains 11 villages.
