= Tabo–Huai Yai Wildlife Sanctuary =

Protected area of Thailand

- เขตรักษาพันธุ์สัตร์ป่าตะเบาะ-ห้วยใหญ่
- IUCN category Ia (strict nature reserve)
- Location within Thailand
- Location: Phetchabun, Chaiyaphum Provinces, Thailand
- Nearest city: Phetchabun
- Coordinates: 16°09′N 101°18′E
- Area: 652 km^{2} (252 sq mi)
- Established: 1997
- Governing body: Department of National Parks, Wildlife and Plant Conservation

Tabo–Huai Yai Wildlife Sanctuary (Thai: เขตรักษาพันธุ์สัตว์ป่าตะเบาะ-ห้วยใหญ่;RTGS: Khet Raksa Phan Satpa Tabo-Huai Yai) is a wildlife sanctuary in Bueng Sam Phan, Nong Phai, Mueang Phetchabun districts of Phetchabun Province and Nong Bua Daeng, Phakdi Chumphon districts of Chaiyaphum Province of Thailand. The sanctuary covers an area of 652 square kilometres (252 sq mi) and was established in 1997.

== Geography ==
Tabo–Huai Yai Wildlife Sanctuary is located about 25 kilometres (16 mi) southeast of Phetchabun town in Sa Kaeo Subdistrict, Bueng Sam Phan District and Bo Thai, Tha Duang subdistricts, Nong Phai District and Na Yom, Tabo subdistricts, Mueang Phetchabun District of Phetchabun Province and Nang Daet, Tham Wua Daeng, Wang Chomphu subdistricts, Nong Bua Daeng District and Ban Chiang, Chao Thong, Laem Thong, Wang Thong subdistricts, Phakdi Chumphon District of Chaiyaphum Province.
The sanctuary's area is 652 square kilometres (252 sq mi) and is abutting Tat Mok National Park to the north, connected with Phu Khiao Wildlife Sanctuary to the northeast and neighbouring Sai Thong National Park to the southeast. Mountain ranges lie on the east and west sides of the sanctuary, the altitude varies from 270 metres (890 ft) to 1,000 metres (3,300 ft).

== Topography ==
Landscape is covered by forested mountains, such as Khao Khi Tao, Khao Lam Luk, Khao Pak Song, Khao Phraya Fo and Khao Tabo. The area is divided into 34% high slope mountain area (shallow valleys, mountain tops, upper slopes and deeply incised streams), 62% hill slope area (open slopes, midslope ridges and u-shaped valleys) and 4% plains.

== History ==
According to the Cabinet Resolution dated May 14 1991, the Forest Department took steps to establish the Tabo–Huai Yai Wildlife Sanctuary on January 14 1992, as announced in the Government Gazette, part 114, section 19 Kor, page 22, date June 10 1997. Since 2002 this wildlife sanctuary has been managed by Protected Areas Regional Office 11 (Phitsanulok).

== Flora ==
The sanctuary features mixed deciduous forest (51%), dry evergreen forest (25%), agricultural area (16%), Abandoned farms (3%), dry deciduous forest (2%), degraded forest (2%) and savanna (1%).

== Fauna ==
In the sanctuary are the following number of species: 60 mammals, 178 birds, 66 reptiles and 32 amphibians.

Mammals in the sanctuary are:

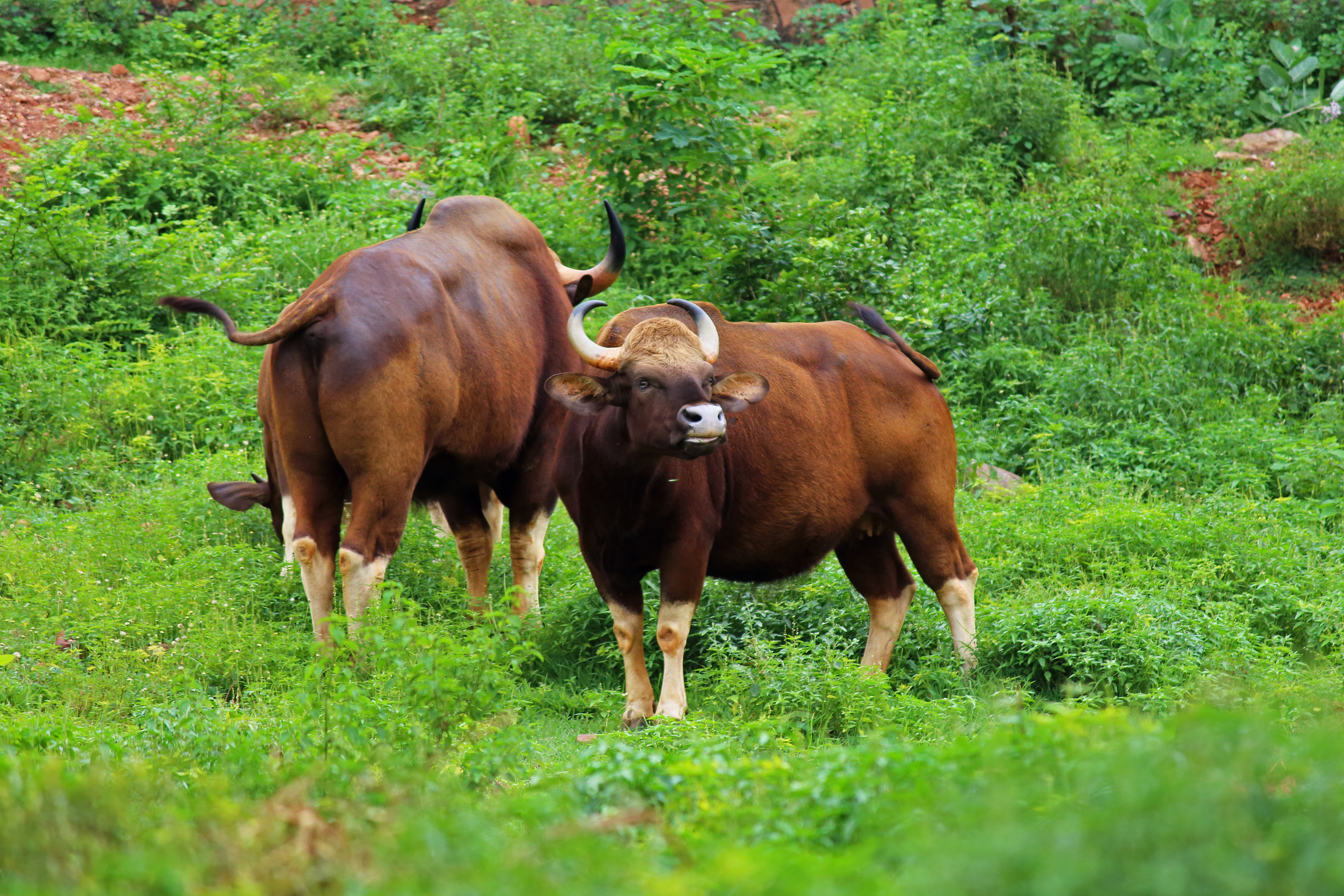
Guar (Bos gaurus)

- Asian black bear (Ursus thibetanus)
- Asian elephant (Elaphus maximus)
- Asian wild dog (Cuon alpinus)
- Banteng (Bos javanicus)
- Barking deer (Muntiacus spp.)
- Flying squirrel (Petinomys spp.)
- Gaur (Bos gaurus)
- Lar gibbon (Hylobatus lar)
- Langur (Trachypithacus spp.)
- Macaque (Macaca spp.)
- Mainland serow (Capricornis sumatraensis)
- Red fox (Vulpes vulpes)
- Sambar deer (Rusa unicolor)
- Sun bear (Helarctos Malayanus)
- Tiger (Panthera tigris)
- Treeshrew (Tupaia spp.)

Five mammal species are listed as Endangered on the IUCN Red List:

- Asian elephant (Elaphus maximus)
- Asian wild dog (Cuon alpinus)
- Banteng (Bos javanicus)
- Lar gibbon (Hylobatus lar)
- Tiger (Panthera tigris)

Seven mammal species are listed as Vulnerable:

- Asian black bear (Ursus thibetanus)
- Flying squirrel (Petinomys spp.)
- Gaur (Bos gaurus)
- Mainland serow (Capricornis sumatraensis)
- Red fox (Vulped vukpes)
- Sambar deer (Rusa unicolor)
- Sun bear (Helarctos Malayanus)

Birds with Hornbill sightings.

Reptiles in the sanctuary are:

- Bengal monitor (Varanus bengalensis)
- Big-headed turtle (Platysternon megacephalum)
- Butterfly lizard (Leiolepsis spp.)
- Lizard (Lacertilia spp.)
- Softshell Turtle (Trionychidea spp.)
- Tokay gecko (Gekko gecko)

Amphibians in the sanctuary are:

- Blunt-headed burrowing frog (Glyphoglossus molossus)
- Crested frog
- Tree frog

== Location ==
Tabo-Huai Yai Wildlife Sanctuary in overview PARO 11 (Phitsanulok)

16) Tabo-Huai Yai Wildlife Sanctuary in overview PARO 11 (Phitsanulok)

	Wildlife sanctuary				
11	Mae Charim	12	Nam Pat	13	Phu Khat
14	Phu Miang-Phu Thong	15	Phu Pha Daeng	16	Tabo-Huai Yai
	National park			1	Khao Kho
2	Khwae Noi	3	Lam Nam Nan	4	Nam Nao
5	Namtok Chat Trakan	6	Phu Hin Rong Kla	7	Phu Soi Dao
8	Tat Mok	9	Thung Salaeng Luang	10	Ton Sak Yai

== See also ==
- List of protected areas of Thailand
- DNP - Tabo-Huai Yai Wildlife Sanctuary
- List of Protected Areas Regional Offices of Thailand
