= Phu Laen Kha National Park =

National park in Thailand

- อุทยานแห่งชาติภูแลนคา
- IUCN category II (national park)
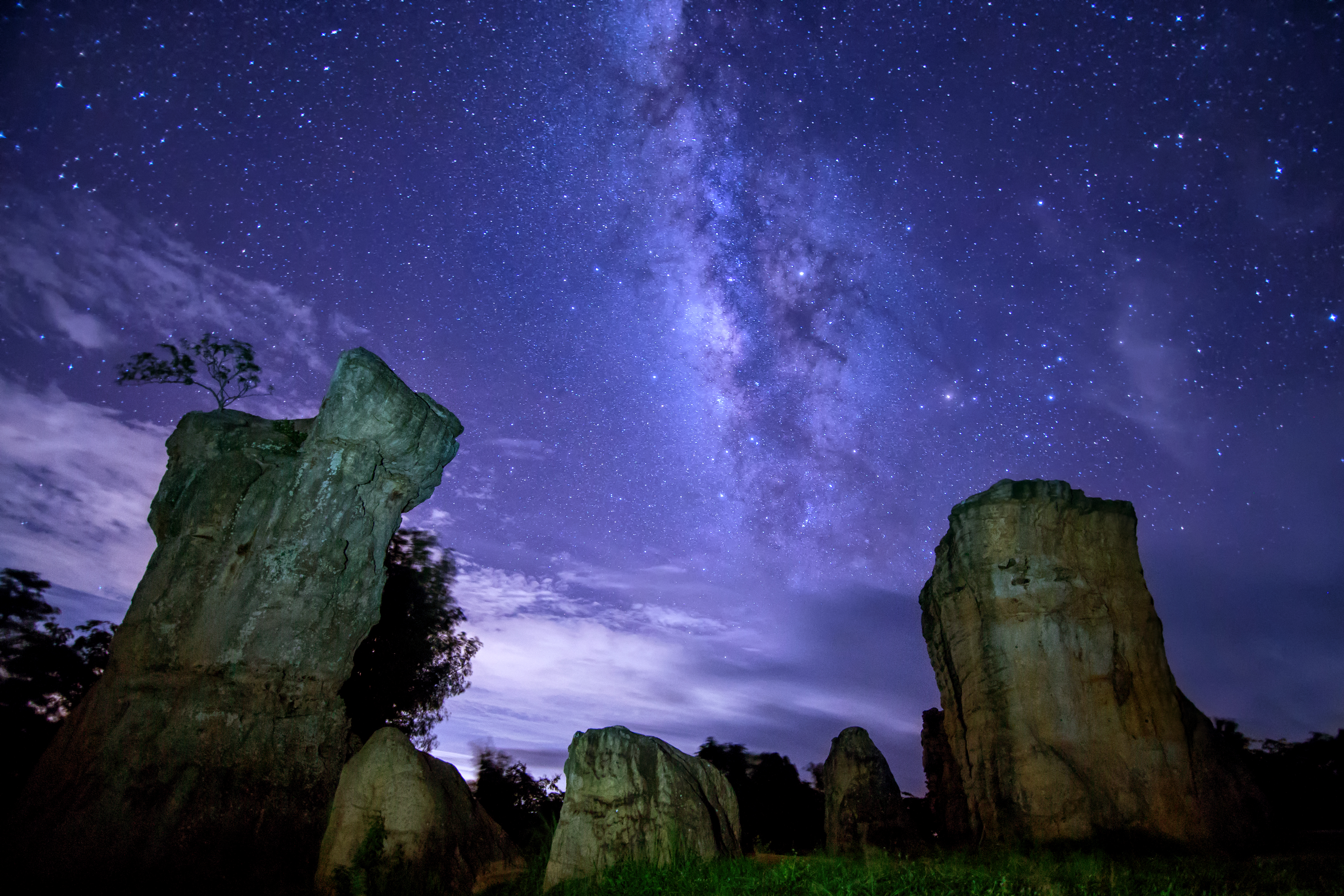
- Mo Hin Khao at night with clearly milky way and stars

- Location within Thailand
- Location: Chaiyaphum Province, Isan, Thailand
- Nearest city: Chaiyaphum
- Coordinates: 16°0′36.3348″N 101°53′26.2284″E
- Area: 200.50 km^{2} (77.41 sq mi)
- Established: 20 December 1996
- Governing body: Department of National Parks, Wildlife and Plant Conservation

Phu Laen Kha National Park (Thai: อุทยานแห่งชาติภูแลนคา) is a national park in Thailand with a total area of 200.50 km^{2} (77.41 sq mi) in Amphoe Kaset Sombun, Amphoe Nong Bua Daeng, Amphoe Mueang Chaiyaphum and Amphoe Ban Khwao of Chaiyaphum Province in northeastern region. It is the 180th national park of Thailand. It is an area consists of complicated mountains and plateaus at an elevation of about 200–725 m (656–2,379 ft).

== Sights ==
- Mo Hin Khao (มอหินขาว) is an iconic rock formation on the sward, similar to Stonehenge of England. Therefore, it is known as "Thailand Stonehenge", regarded as both the symbol and the landmark that is best known for the national park. In addition, this place was also selected to be one of the 2009 TV commercial locations of Tourism Authority of Thailand (TAT) under the campaign "12 Months 7 Stars 9 Suns" (12 เดือน 7 ดาว 9 ตะวัน) presented by Thongchai "Bird" McIntyre.

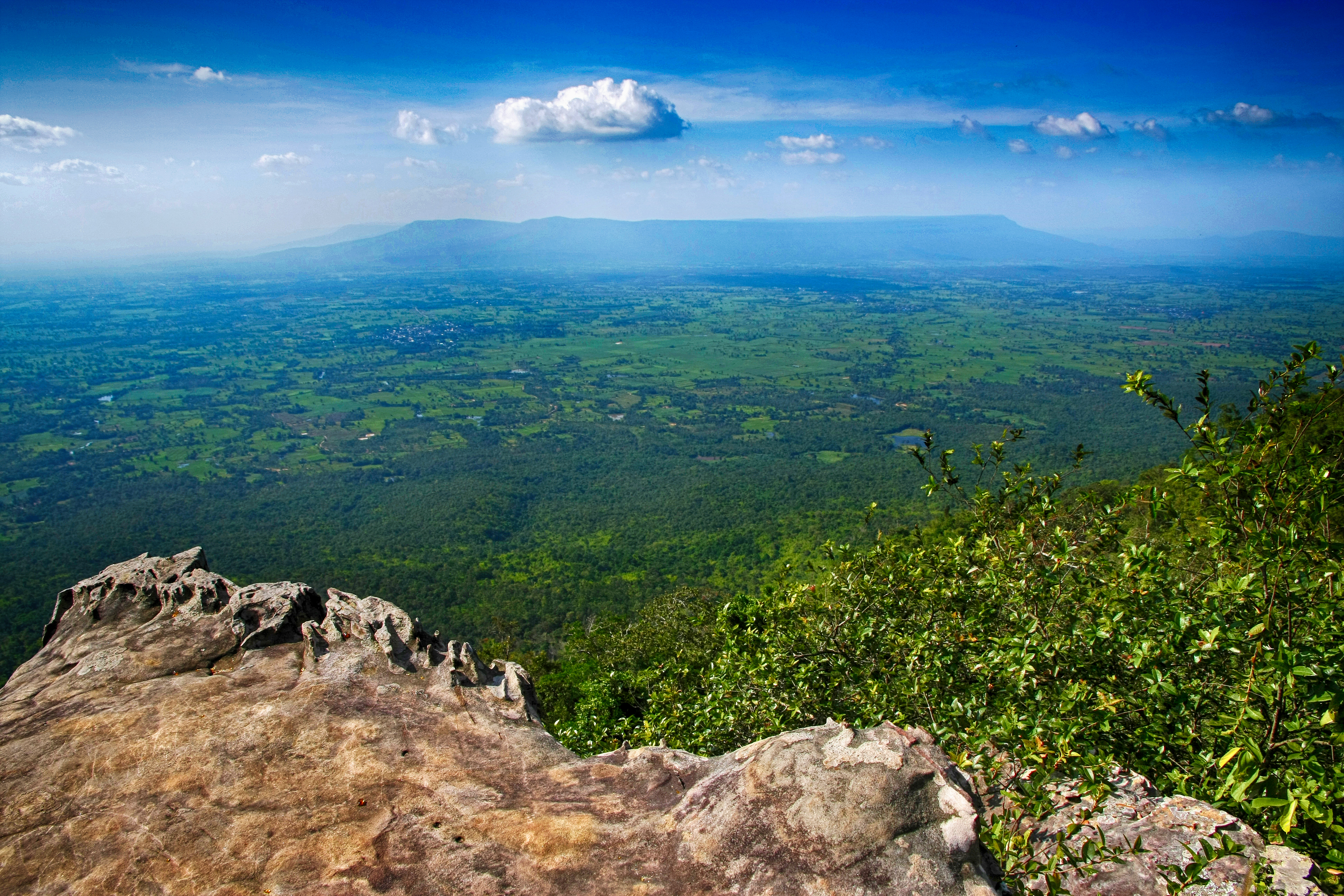
View of Chiyaphum and Phang Heuy mountain range from Pha Hua Nak viewpoint.

- Pha Hua Nak (ผาหัวนาค), cliff and viewpoint that are not far from Mo Hin Khao (about 4 km (2 mi)). Pha Hua Nak is about 905 m (2969 ft) above average sea level and can see the Mueang Chaiyaphum below, with cool temperatures throughout the day. On the opposite side of Pha Hua Nak is the Phang Heuy mountain range (เทือกเขาพังเหย). Its name refers to "Naga [mythical serpent]'s head cliff", according to its characteristics.
- Pha Kluai Mai (ผากล้วยไม้), another viewpoint cliff of the park.
- Hin Prasart (หินปราสาท), a striking natural upright rock apart from Mo Hin Khao.
- Pratu Khlong (ประตูโขลง), a strange stone that looks like a beautiful arch.

== Location ==
Phu Laenkha National Park in overview PARO 7 (Nakhon Ratchasima)

2) Phu Laenkha National Park in overview PARO 7 (Nakhon Ratchasima)

	National park
1	Pa Hin Ngam
2	Phu Laenkha
3	Sai Thong
4	Tat Ton
	Wildlife sanctuary
5	Dong Yai
6	Pha Phueng
7	Phu Khiao

	Non-hunting area
8	Angkepnam Huai Chorakhe Mak
9	Angkepnam Huai Talat
10	Angkepnam Sanambin
11	Bueng Lahan
12	Khao Phaeng Ma
13	Lam Nang Rong
14	Nong Waeng
15	Pa Khao Phu Luang
16	Phu Khao Fai Kradong

	Forest park
17	Khao Kradong
