= Sai Thong National Park =

National park in Thailand

- อุทยานแห่งชาติไทรทอง
- IUCN category II (national park)
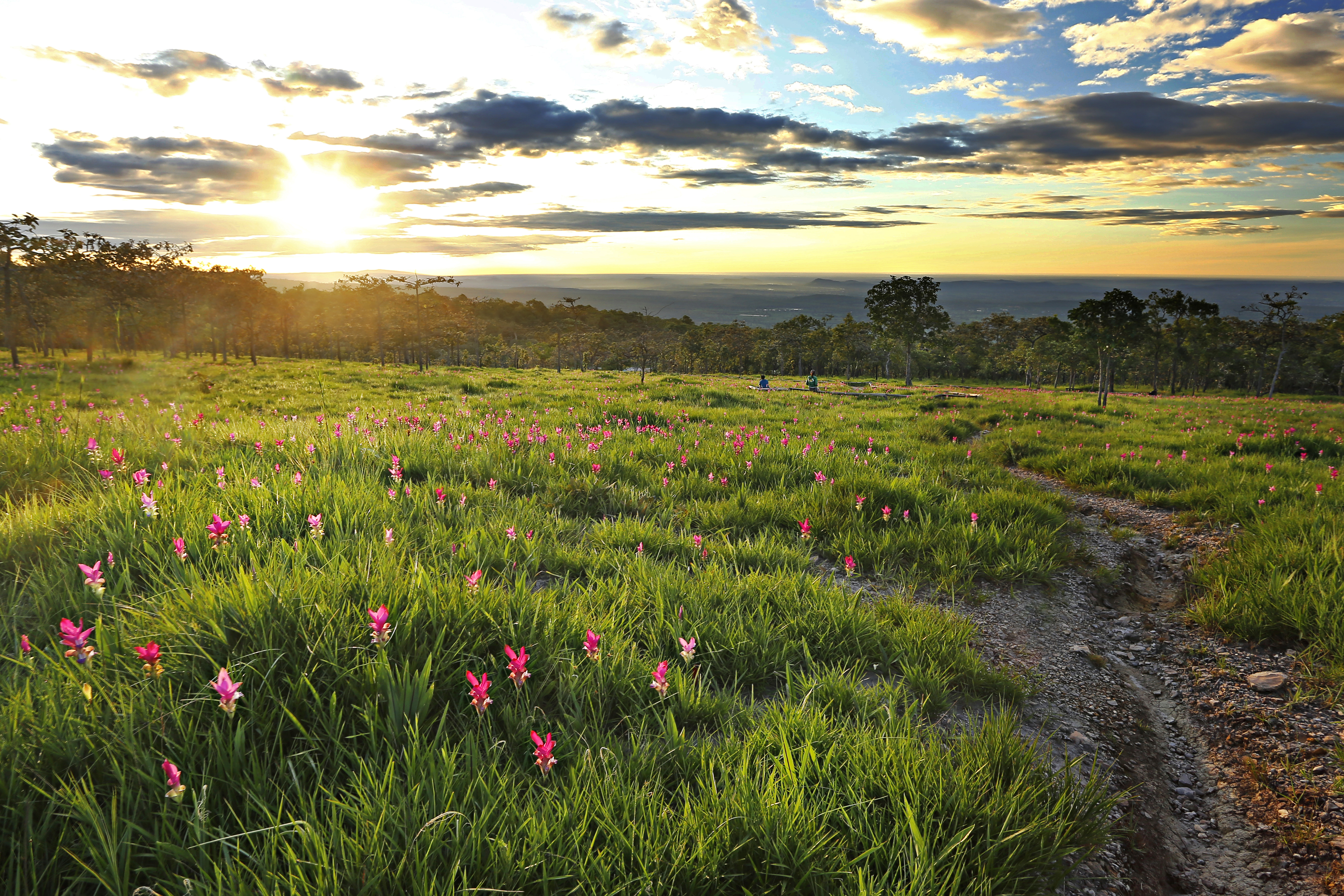
- Krachiao blossoms

- Location within Thailand
- Location: Thailand
- Nearest city: Chaiyaphum
- Coordinates: 15°52′17″N 101°30′54″E
- Area: 319 km^{2} (123 sq mi)
- Established: 30 December 1992
- Visitors: 51,233 (in 2019)
- Governing body: Department of National Parks, Wildlife and Plant Conservation

Sai Thong National Park (Thai: อุทยานแห่งชาติไทรทอง) is a national park in Thailand's Chaiyaphum Province. This mountainous park features waterfalls, scenic viewpoints, and a seasonal flower field.

== Geography ==
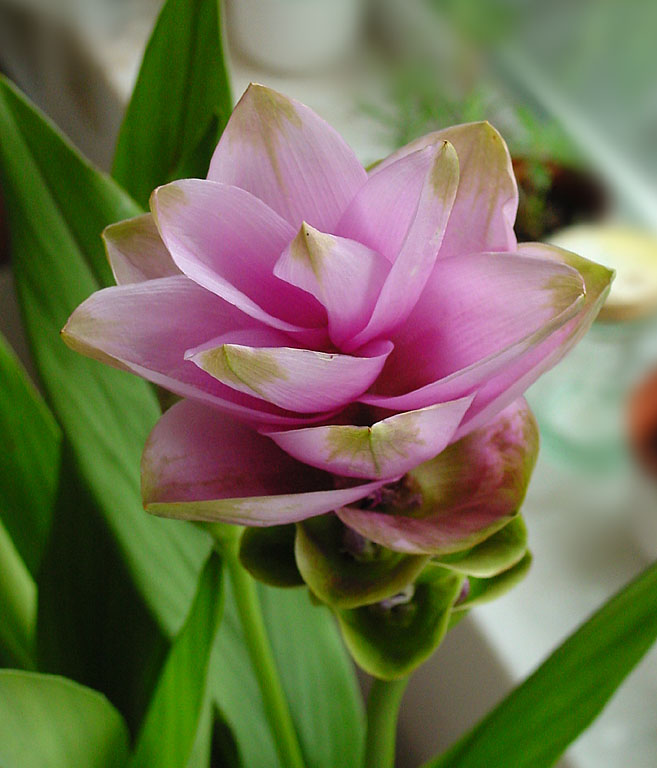
Siam tulip

Sai Thong National Park is about 70 km (43 mi) west of Chaiyaphum town in the Nong Bua Rawe, Thep Sathit, Phakdi Chumphon and Nong Bua Daeng Districts of Chaiyaphum Province. The park's area is 199,375 rai ~ 319 km^{2} (123 sq mi). The park is in the Phang Hoei mountain range and the park's highest point is Khao Phang Hoei at 1,008 m (3,307 ft). Numerous tributaries of the Chi River have their source within the park's boundaries. The park's forest types consist of mixed deciduous, dipterocarp and dry evergreen forest.

== Previous inhabitants ==
Shortly after Sai Thong was established in 1992, the forest dwellers who had lived there before the park was created, had their dwellings and lands annexed by the park. Indigenous forest dwellers, whose forebears were living in the area before Thailand came into being, were deemed criminals subject to imprisonment. More than 10 million persons in some 2,700 forest communities across Thailand face eviction and legal sanctions. More than 7,000 villagers are sent to jail each year for park encroachment. Forest evictions, often violent, have increased following the 2014 Thai coup d'état under the junta's "forest reclaiming" policy. The current (2019) national park law that criminalizes forest dwellers will soon be replaced by a new version that is even more oppressive. The new law gives forest officials the power to summon people for questioning and to enter their homes at any time. They will be empowered to destroy dwellings in the forest at will. Penalties will include jail sentences of up to 20 years and maximum fines of two million baht.

In 2018, 14 cassava-growing peasants, nine of them women, were found guilty by a lower court of encroaching on Sai Thong National Park after forestry authorities filed complaints against the villagers for refusing to leave. The villagers were ordered to pay compensation fees for environmental degradation ranging from 40,000 to 1.58 million baht (US$1,300-51,000) for 1 to 48 rai (0.16-7.7 hectares) of land use. Those charged with refusing to leave had settled there in the 1970s, before the national park was established in 1992.

== Location ==
Sai Thong National Park in overview PARO 7 (Nakhon Ratchasima)

3) Sai Thong National Park in overview PARO 7 (Nakhon Ratchasima)

	National park
1	Pa Hin Ngam
2	Phu Laenkha
3	Sai Thong
4	Tat Ton
	Wildlife sanctuary
5	Dong Yai
6	Pha Phueng
7	Phu Khiao

	Non-hunting area
8	Angkepnam Huai Chorakhe Mak
9	Angkepnam Huai Talat
10	Angkepnam Sanambin
11	Bueng Lahan
12	Khao Phaeng Ma
13	Lam Nang Rong
14	Nong Waeng
15	Pa Khao Phu Luang
16	Phu Khao Fai Kradong

	Forest park
17	Khao Kradong

== See also ==
- List of Protected Areas Regional Offices of Thailand
