= Phu Khiao Wildlife Sanctuary =

Wildlife sanctuary in Chaiyaphum province, Thailand

Coordinates: 16°20′16.8″N 101°32′49.7″E

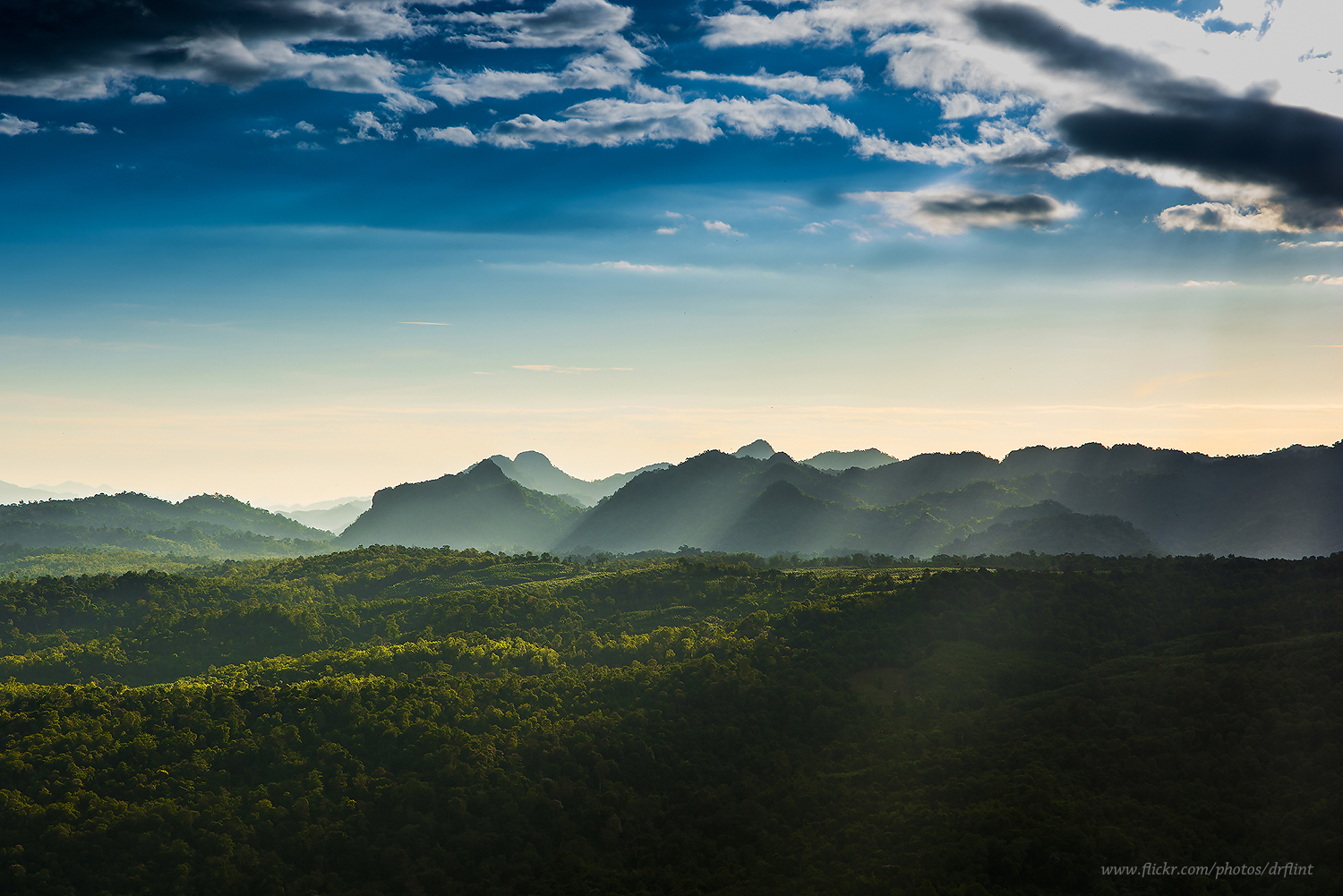
Mountain range at Phu Khiao

Phu Khiao Wildlife Sanctuary (or written as Phu Khieo; Thai: เขตรักษาพันธุ์สัตว์ป่าภูเขียว) is a wildlife sanctuary in Thailand. It overlaps with three districts of Chaiyaphum province, namely Khon San, Kaset Sombun, and Nong Bua Daeng, covering about 975,000 rai (1,560 km^{2}).

The wildlife sanctuary contains Thung Kamang (ทุ่งกะมัง), an extensive grassland covering an area of approximately 5,000 rai (8.0 km^{2}) at an elevation of 900 m (3,000 ft). It features natural Arundinaria pusilla grassland on the undulated hills alternating with the forest line that make it look like continuous waves with many streams running through it and is surrounded with hill evergreen forest. This grassland is well-known as a breeding ground for endangered wildlife like hog deer, a medium-sized deer that is almost extinct in Thailand. Nowadays, they are distributed throughout the wildlife sanctuary. The surrounding area of Thung Kamang consists of many reservoirs.

== Location ==
Phu Khiao Wildlife Sanctuary in overview PARO 7 (Nakhon Ratchasima)

7) Phu Khiao Wildlife Sanctuary in overview PARO 7 (Nakhon Ratchasima)

	National park
1	Pa Hin Ngam
2	Phu Laenkha
3	Sai Thong
4	Tat Ton
	Wildlife sanctuary
5	Dong Yai
6	Pha Phueng
7	Phu Khiao

	Non-hunting area
8	Angkepnam Huai Chorakhe Mak
9	Angkepnam Huai Talat
10	Angkepnam Sanambin
11	Bueng Lahan
12	Khao Phaeng Ma
13	Lam Nang Rong
14	Nong Waeng
15	Pa Khao Phu Luang
16	Phu Khao Fai Kradong

	Forest park
17	Khao Kradong
