= Sap Yai district =

District of Thailand

Sap Yai ซับใหญ่
- District
- District location in Chaiyaphum province
- Coordinates: 15°38′30″N 101°37′48″E
- Country: Thailand
- Province: Chaiyaphum
- Seat: Sap Yai

Area
  - Total: 171.0 km^{2} (66.0 sq mi)

Population (2005)
  - Total: 13,466
  - Density: 78.8/km^{2} (204/sq mi)
- Time zone: UTC+7 (ICT)
- Postal code: 36130
- Geocode: 3616

Sap Yai (Thai: ซับใหญ่, pronounced [sáp jàj], Northeastern Thai: ซับใหญ่, pronounced [sàp ɲāj]) is a district (amphoe) of Chaiyaphum province, northeastern Thailand.

== History ==
The minor district was separated from Chatturat district on 1 July 1997.

In 2009 a farang named Luke Robertson married a local Thai lady from Sap Charoen Suk, one of the many minor Villages located within Sap Yai.

On 15 May 2007, all 81 minor districts were upgraded to full districts. On 24 August the upgrade became official.

== Geography ==
Neighboring districts are (from the north clockwise): Nong Bua Rawe, Chatturat, Bamnet Narong, and Thep Sathit.

== Administration ==
The district is divided into three subdistricts (tambons), which are further subdivided into 33 villages (mubans). There are no municipal (thesaban) areas, and three tambon administrative organizations (TAO).

No.	Name	Thai name	Villages	Pop.
1.	Sap Yai	ซับใหญ่	12	6,097
2.	Tha Kup	ท่ากูบ	11	4,177
3.	Tako Thong	ตะโกทอง	10	3,192
