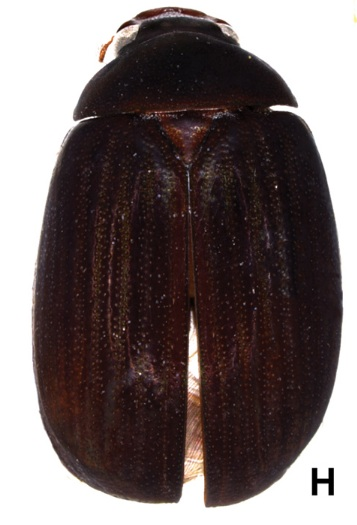

Scientific classification
- Kingdom: Animalia
- Phylum: Arthropoda
- Clade: Pancrustacea
- Class: Insecta
- Order: Coleoptera
- Suborder: Polyphaga
- Infraorder: Scarabaeiformia
- Family: Scarabaeidae
- Genus: Tetraserica
- Species: T. pahinngamensis

Binomial name
- Tetraserica pahinngamensis Fabrizi, Dalstein & Ahrens, 2019

= Tetraserica pahinngamensis =

Species of beetle

Tetraserica pahinngamensis is a species of beetle of the family Scarabaeidae. It is found in Thailand.

== Description ==
Adults reach a length of about 7.6–8.9 mm. The surface of the labroclypeus and the disc of the frons are glabrous. The smooth area anterior to the eye is twice as wide as long.

== Etymology ==
The species name refers to its occurrence in the Pa Hin Ngam National Park.
