= Lom Sak district =

Lom Sak หล่มสัก
- District
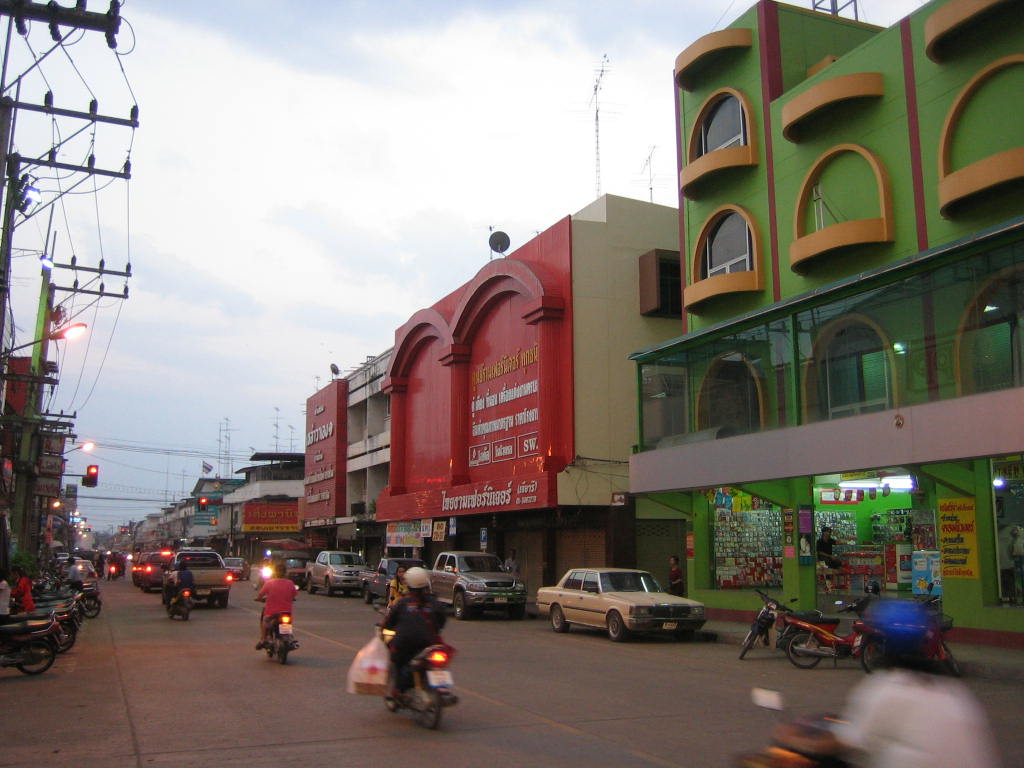

- District location in Phetchabun province
- Coordinates: 16°46′46″N 101°14′32″E
- Country: Thailand
- Province: Phetchabun

Area
  - Total: 1,535.3 km^{2} (592.8 sq mi)

Population (2000)
  - Total: 150,680
  - Density: 98.1/km^{2} (254/sq mi)
- Time zone: UTC+7 (ICT)
- Postal code: 67110
- Geocode: 6703

Lom Sak (Thai: หล่มสัก, pronounced [lòm sàk]) is a district (amphoe) in the northern part of Phetchabun province, northern Thailand.

== History ==
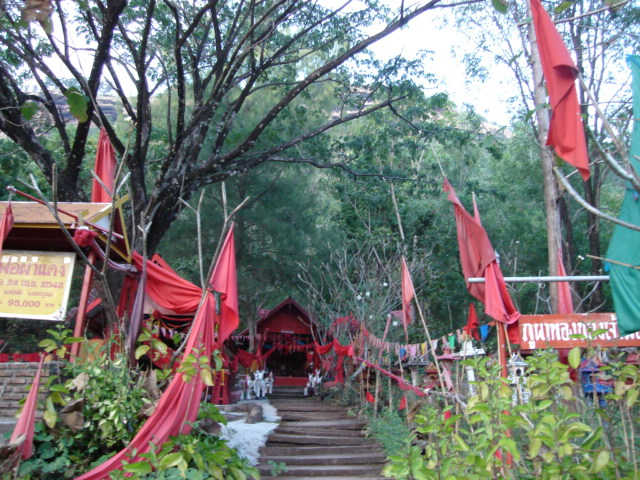
A shrine to Tai folk religion deity Pho Padang in Lom Sak.

The history of Lom Sak area dates back to the founding of the Sukhothai Kingdom in the 13th century. The governor of Mueang Rat (Lom Sak), Pho Khun Pha Mueang (พ่อขุนผาเมือง), was one of the Thai warlords who defeated the Khmer. When Pho Khun Bang Klang Hao (พ่อขุนบางกลางหาว) and a friend established the Sukhothai Kingdom, he supported his friend to be the first king because his wife was Khmer.

In 1767 in the reign of King Taksin the Great, Phraya Chakri (the later King Rama I) returned from an expedition to Vientiane through the area of present-day Lom Kao district. Some of the people from Vientiane settled there. When the new town grew bigger, they moved their town to the plain near the Pa Sak River and named the new town Lom Sak. Later other Lao from Vientiane, who was forced by King Taksin to settle in Lopburi, returned and settled in Lom Sak.

According to the historian Prince Damrong Rajanubhab, Mueang Lom Sak was established in the reign of King Nangklao (Rama III). When King Chulalongkorn (Rama V) created the monthon as part of the Thesaphiban administrative reforms, Mueang Lom Sak was controlled by Monthon Phetchabun. Later it was downgraded to be a district of Phetchabun Province. In 1916, the district was named Wat Pa (วัดป่า). The name was changed back to Lom Sak on 11 November 1938.

From 1970 to 1980 the hills of Lom Sak were a stronghold of the Communist Party of Thailand.

== Geography ==
Neighboring districts are (from the north clockwise) Lom Kao and Nam Nao of Phetchabun Province, Khon San of Chaiyaphum province, and Mueang Phetchabun and Khao Kho of Phetchabun.

Nam Nao National Park protects some of the hills of the district. Khao Kho National Park is currently being developed and will also occupy parts of the district.

== Climate ==
Climate data for Lom Sak (1991–2020, extremes 1970-present)
Month	Jan	Feb	Mar	Apr	May	Jun	Jul	Aug	Sep	Oct	Nov	Dec	Year
Record high °C (°F)	37.3 (99.1)	38.8 (101.8)	40.7 (105.3)	42.3 (108.1)	41.4 (106.5)	39.7 (103.5)	37.3 (99.1)	37.0 (98.6)	36.2 (97.2)	36.3 (97.3)	37.1 (98.8)	36.3 (97.3)	42.3 (108.1)
Mean daily maximum °C (°F)	32.3 (90.1)	34.1 (93.4)	36.0 (96.8)	36.8 (98.2)	35.3 (95.5)	34.0 (93.2)	32.7 (90.9)	32.0 (89.6)	32.5 (90.5)	32.8 (91.0)	32.6 (90.7)	31.4 (88.5)	33.5 (92.4)
Daily mean °C (°F)	24.4 (75.9)	26.1 (79.0)	28.2 (82.8)	29.4 (84.9)	28.9 (84.0)	28.5 (83.3)	27.8 (82.0)	27.4 (81.3)	27.3 (81.1)	27.0 (80.6)	25.9 (78.6)	24.2 (75.6)	27.1 (80.8)
Mean daily minimum °C (°F)	18.1 (64.6)	19.5 (67.1)	22.0 (71.6)	24.0 (75.2)	24.6 (76.3)	24.6 (76.3)	24.2 (75.6)	24.0 (75.2)	23.9 (75.0)	22.8 (73.0)	20.4 (68.7)	18.2 (64.8)	22.2 (72.0)
Record low °C (°F)	6.7 (44.1)	9.8 (49.6)	11.6 (52.9)	18.0 (64.4)	20.4 (68.7)	20.9 (69.6)	20.6 (69.1)	20.3 (68.5)	18.8 (65.8)	14.0 (57.2)	8.6 (47.5)	5.5 (41.9)	5.5 (41.9)
Average precipitation mm (inches)	6.8 (0.27)	16.3 (0.64)	41.5 (1.63)	63.1 (2.48)	134.3 (5.29)	127.7 (5.03)	144.7 (5.70)	204.7 (8.06)	196.3 (7.73)	81.8 (3.22)	13.3 (0.52)	6.3 (0.25)	1,036.8 (40.82)
Average precipitation days (≥ 1.0 mm)	1.0	1.4	3.8	5.8	11.3	11.9	13.9	15.2	13.5	7.0	1.4	0.7	86.9
Average relative humidity (%)	63.6	61.5	62.8	66.5	75.0	77.8	80.4	82.7	83.1	77.3	69.4	64.9	72.1
Mean monthly sunshine hours	257.3	243.0	238.7	204.0	158.1	117.0	120.9	58.9	108.0	198.4	252.0	275.9	2,232.2
Mean daily sunshine hours	8.3	8.6	7.7	6.8	5.1	3.9	3.9	1.9	3.6	6.4	8.4	8.9	6.1
Source 1: World Meteorological Organization
Source 2: Office of Water Management and Hydrology, Royal Irrigation Department (sun 1981–2010)(extremes)

== Administration ==
The district is divided into 23 sub-districts (tambons), which are further subdivided into 251 villages (mubans). Lom Sak itself is a town (thesaban mueang) which covers tambon Lom Sak. There are a further 20 tambon administrative organizations (TAO).

1.	Lom Sak	หล่มสัก
2.	Wat Pa	วัดป่า
3.	Tan Diao	ตาลเดี่ยว
4.	Fai Na Saeng	ฝายนาแซง
5.	Nong Sawang	หนองสว่าง
6.	Nam Hia	น้ำเฮี้ย
7.	Sak Long	สักหลง
8.	Tha Ibun	ท่าอิบุญ
9.	Ban Sok	บ้านโสก
10.	Ban Tio	บ้านติ้ว
11.	Huai Rai	ห้วยไร่
12.	Nam Ko	น้ำก้อ
13.	Pak Chong	ปากช่อง
14.	Nam Chun	น้ำชุน
15.	Nong Khwai	หนองไขว่
16.	Lan Ba	ลานบ่า
17.	Bung Khla	บุ่งคล้า
18.	Bung Namtao	บุ่งน้ำเต้า
19.	Ban Klang	บ้านกลาง
20.	Chang Talut	ช้างตะลูด
21.	Ban Rai	บ้านไร่
22.	Pak Duk	ปากดุก
23.	Ban Wai	บ้านหวาย
