= Pa Hin Ngam National Park =

National park in Thailand

- IUCN category II (national park)
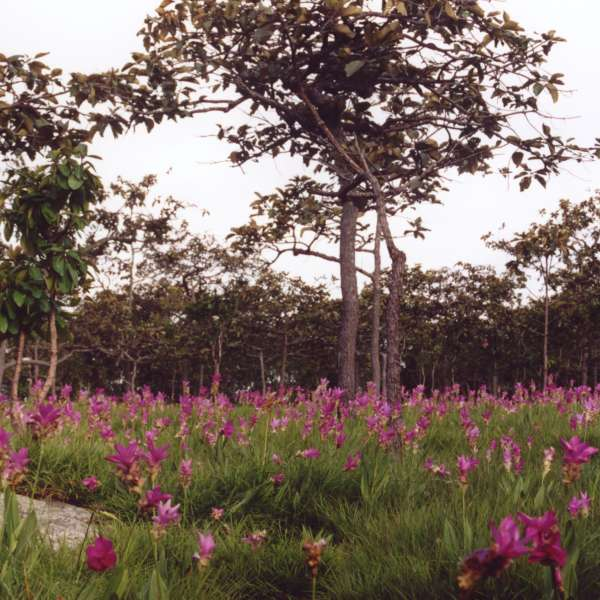
- Siamese tulip fields

- Location within Thailand
- Location: Thep Sathit district, Chaiyaphum Province, Thailand
- Coordinates: 15°39′34″N 101°23′24″E
- Area: 100 km^{2} (39 sq mi)
- Established: 1986 and then 1994
- Visitors: 106,428 (in 2019)
- Governing body: Department of National Parks, Wildlife and Plant Conservation

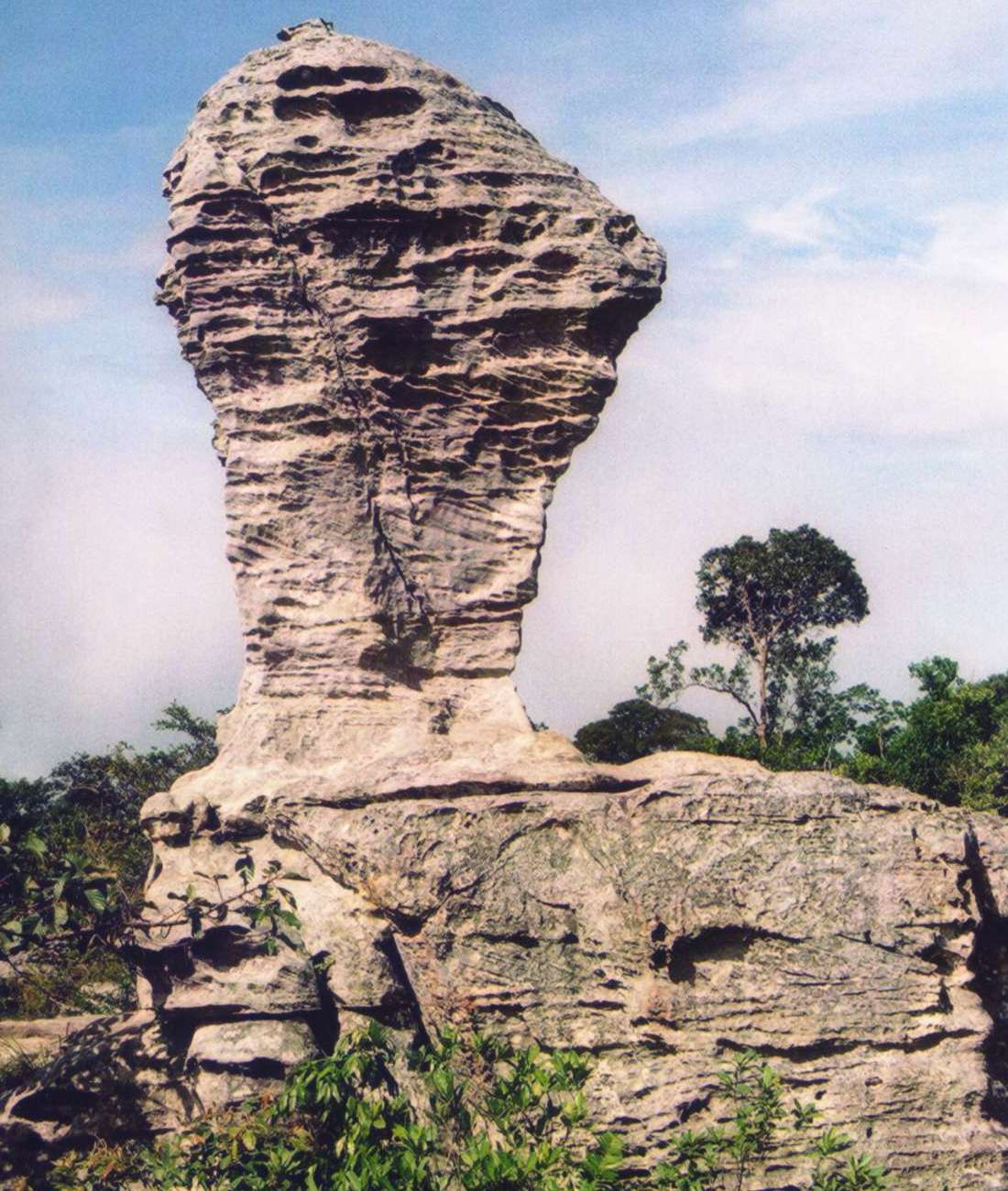
Rock formations

Pa Hin Ngam National Park (Thai: ป่าหินงาม) is a national park in Chaiyaphum Province, Thailand. "Hin ngam" means "beautiful stone", "pa" means "forest". The park got its name from the strange rock formations at the west end of the park. Erosion has carved several large rocks into striking and unusual shapes.

In 1985, the Tep Satit Forestry Department first surveyed the area, long popular with locals, and recommended its protection. In October 1986, Pa Hin Ngam Park was created, covering 10 km^{2} around the strange rock formations which gave the park its name. In 1993, the Forestry Department of Thailand conducted a more thorough survey including the surrounding area, and recommended that it become a national park. The national park covering 62,437 rai ~ 100 square kilometres (39 sq mi) was created on 19 September 1994, which was officially gazetted in 2007.

The park is at the boundary of the Dong Phaya Yen Mountains and the Khorat Plateau. The steep cliff at the 846 m high Sut Phan Din viewpoint affords a view into a valley of the Sonthi River and the Sap Langka Wildlife Sanctuary. The name "Sut Phan Din" (สุดแผ่นดิน) means "end of land", reflecting the steepness of the cliff. This cliff also marks the watershed between the Chao Phraya and the Mekong rivers.

- Lan Hin Ngam (ลานหินงาม) It was caused by the erosion of the soil and rocks into different shapes, which can be imagined as many kinds of objects and animals such as nails, radar, and hens.
- Dok Kra Jiao or Bua Sawan Field (ทุ่งดอกกระเจียว หรือ ทุ่งบัวสวรรค์) Kra Jiao, a kind of curcuma, is an annual plant in the same species as ginger-galingale, scattered generally from Lan Hin Ngam to the Sut Phaendin viewpoint. Near the viewpoint is one of the fields of the Siam tulip (Curcuma alismatifolia), called "Dok Kra Jiao" (ดอกกระเจียว) in Thai. The dipterocarp forests bloom with the purple flowers at the beginning of the rainy season in July.
- Sut Phaendin (สุดแผ่นดิน) is a steep cliff and the highest point of the Phang Hoei mountain range, two kilometres from the park office at 846 metres elevation. It is the cliff connecting between the central and northeastern regions.
- Namtok Thep Phana (น้ำตกเทพพนา) is a medium-size waterfall originating from Huai Krachon flowing from the Phang Hoei mountain range. It has three tiers. There is water only during the rainy season.

== Flora ==
Pa Hin Ngam National park has the area that is full of green 112 square kilometers, has many kinds of plants, and the place to see the beautiful plants in the national park. There are two places that have different kinds of plant, the first is the place where you also can see the view that has a lot of trees called "Sut Phaendin" and the second is the place that has the most beautiful flower in the national park called "Bua Sawan Field". Most of the area is a green field and it looks fertile because of many kinds of trees and they can be grown for the whole year. There are two different kinds of plants, the tropical plant and the dry evergreen plant. Also, these plants are protected by the officer of the national park for keeping them safe because the plants can be easy to destroy. However, the second place called "Bua Sawan Field" has more beautiful plants than Sut Phaendin.

Bua Sawan Field has only a plant called Siam tulip locally called "Dok Kra jiao". But it grows only during the rainy season.

== Location ==
Pa Hin Ngam National Park in overview PARO 7 (Nakhon Ratchasima)

1) Pa Hin Ngam National Park in overview PARO 7 (Nakhon Ratchasima)

	National park
1	Pa Hin Ngam
2	Phu Laenkha
3	Sai Thong
4	Tat Ton
	Wildlife sanctuary
5	Dong Yai
6	Pha Phueng
7	Phu Khiao

	Non-hunting area
8	Angkepnam Huai Chorakhe Mak
9	Angkepnam Huai Talat
10	Angkepnam Sanambin
11	Bueng Lahan
12	Khao Phaeng Ma
13	Lam Nang Rong
14	Nong Waeng
15	Pa Khao Phu Luang
16	Phu Khao Fai Kradong

	Forest park
17	Khao Kradong

== See also ==
- List of national parks of Thailand
- List of Protected Areas Regional Offices of Thailand
