= Mueang Phetchabun district =

Mueang Phetchabun เมืองเพชรบูรณ์
- District
- District location in Phetchabun province
- Coordinates: 16°26′35″N 101°8′57″E
- Country: Thailand
- Province: Phetchabun

Area
  - Total: 2,281.0 km^{2} (880.7 sq mi)

Population (2015)
  - Total: 210,513
  - Density: 92.6/km^{2} (240/sq mi)
- Time zone: UTC+7 (ICT)
- Postal code: 67000
- Geocode: 6701

Mueang Phetchabun (Thai: เมืองเพชรบูรณ์, pronounced [mɯ̄a̯ŋ pʰét.t͡ɕʰā.būːn]) is the capital district (amphoe mueang) of Phetchabun province, northern Thailand.

== History ==
Mueang Phetchabun was an ancient frontier city, established in Sukhothai era. Prince Damrong Rajanubhab founded the forts on both banks of the Pa Sak River. Inside the old city is a Wat Mahathat, the symbol of an important city.

During the Thesaphiban administrative reform, Phetchabun Province was merged with Lom Sak, and became part of the Monthon Phetchabun in 1899. Monthon Phetchabun was included as part of Monthon Phitsanulok in 1904 and re-established in 1907. The monthon was again included in Phitsanulok in 1915.

Due to its strategic location, in 1943 Mueang Phetchabun was proposed as the new capital of Thailand, to be named Nakhonban Phetchabun (นครบาลเพชรบูรณ์). This proposal, by Prime Minister Field Marshal Plaek Phibunsongkhram, was not approved by parliament, thus it continued to be a district as before.

== Geography ==
Neighboring districts are (from the south clockwise) Nong Phai, Chon Daen, Wang Pong of Phetchabun Province, Noen Maprang of Phitsanulok province, Khao Kho, Lom Sak of Phetchabun Province, Khon San and Nong Bua Daeng of Chaiyaphum province.

Tat Mok National Park (อุทยานแห่งชาติตาดหมอก) is in the district.

The main water resource is the Pa Sak River.

== Administration ==
=== Central administration ===
Mueang Phetchabun is divided into 17 subdistricts (tambons), which are further subdivided into 221 administrative villages (mubans).

No.	Name	Thai	Villages	Pop.
1.	Nai Mueang	ในเมือง	-	22,038
2.	Tabo	ตะเบาะ	11	8,601
3.	Ban Tok	บ้านโตก	13	11,311
4.	Sadiang	สะเดียง	13	25,545
5.	Pa Lao	ป่าเลา	16	9,832
6.	Na Ngua	นางั่ว	13	12,674
7.	Tha Phon	ท่าพล	21	18,062
8.	Dong Mun Lek	ดงมูลเหล็ก	11	9,581
9.	Ban Khok	บ้านโคก	17	12,200
10.	Chon Phrai	ชอนไพร	11	8,148
11.	Na Pa	นาป่า	17	12,850
12.	Na Yom	นายม	15	8,341
13.	Wang Chomphu	วังชมภู	14	16,265
14.	Nam Ron	น้ำร้อน	11	7,151
15.	Huai Sakae	ห้วยสะแก	14	9,907
16.	Huai Yai	ห้วยใหญ่	14	10,981
17.	Rawing	ระวิง	10	7,026

=== Local administration ===
There is one town (thesaban mueang) in the district:

- Phetchabun (Thai: เทศบาลเมืองเพชรบูรณ์) consisting of sub-district Nai Mueang.

There are three sub-district municipalities (thesaban tambons) in the district:

- Tha Phon (Thai: เทศบาลตำบลท่าพล) consisting of parts of sub-district Tha Phon.
- Wang Chomphu (Thai: เทศบาลตำบลวังชมภู) consisting of parts of sub-district Wang Chomphu.
- Na Ngua (Thai: เทศบาลตำบลนางั่ว) consisting of sub-district Na Ngua.

There are 15 sub-district administrative organizations (SAO) in the district:

- Tabo (Thai: องค์การบริหารส่วนตำบลตะเบาะ) consisting of sub-district Tabo.
- Ban Tok (Thai: องค์การบริหารส่วนตำบลบ้านโตก) consisting of sub-district Ban Tok.
- Sadiang (Thai: องค์การบริหารส่วนตำบลสะเดียง) consisting of sub-district Sadiang.
- Pa Lao (Thai: องค์การบริหารส่วนตำบลป่าเลา) consisting of sub-district Pa Lao.
- Tha Phon (Thai: องค์การบริหารส่วนตำบลท่าพล) consisting of parts of sub-district Tha Phon.
- Dong Mun Lek (Thai: องค์การบริหารส่วนตำบลดงมูลเหล็ก) consisting of sub-district Dong Mun Lek.
- Ban Khok (Thai: องค์การบริหารส่วนตำบลบ้านโคก) consisting of sub-district Ban Khok.
- Chon Phrai (Thai: องค์การบริหารส่วนตำบลชอนไพร) consisting of sub-district Chon Phrai.
- Na Pa (Thai: องค์การบริหารส่วนตำบลนาป่า) consisting of sub-district Na Pa.
- Na Yom (Thai: องค์การบริหารส่วนตำบลนายม) consisting of sub-district Na Yom.
- Wang Chomphu (Thai: องค์การบริหารส่วนตำบลวังชมภู) consisting of parts of sub-district Wang Chomphu.
- Nam Ron (Thai: องค์การบริหารส่วนตำบลน้ำร้อน) consisting of sub-district Nam Ron.
- Huai Sakae (Thai: องค์การบริหารส่วนตำบลห้วยสะแก) consisting of sub-district Huai Sakae.
- Huai Yai (Thai: องค์การบริหารส่วนตำบลห้วยใหญ่) consisting of sub-district Huai Yai.
- Rawing (Thai: องค์การบริหารส่วนตำบลระวิง) consisting of sub-district Rawing.
