= Khon San district =

Khon San คอนสาร
- District
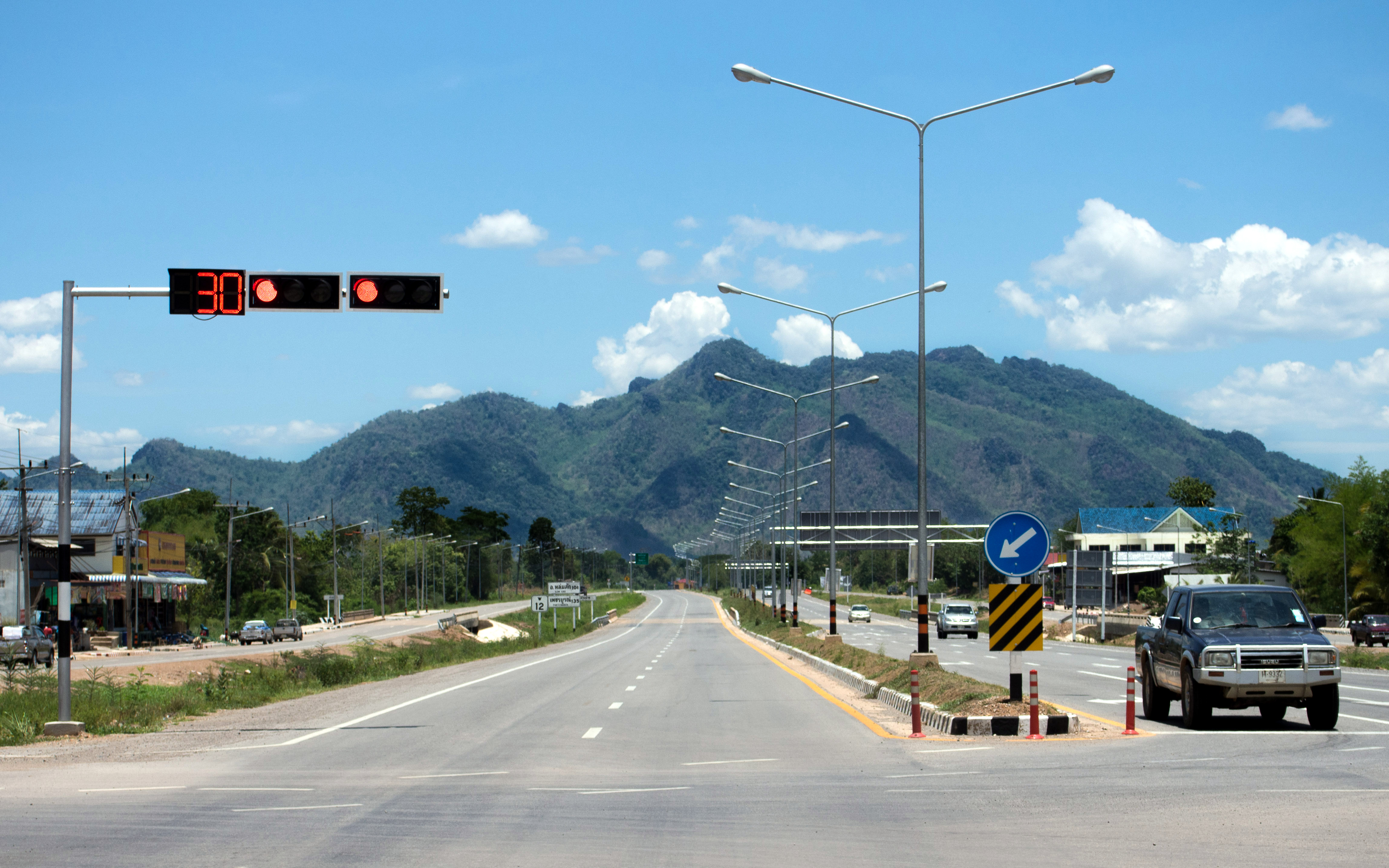
- View from the main intersection of Highway 12 in Khon San township towards the Phetchabun Mountains to the west

- District location in Chaiyaphum province
- Coordinates: 16°36′48″N 101°55′11″E
- Country: Thailand
- Province: Chaiyaphum
- Seat: Khon San
- Subdistrict: 8
- Muban: 85

Area
  - Total: 966.665 km^{2} (373.231 sq mi)

Population (2016)
  - Total: 62,037
  - Density: 60.9/km^{2} (158/sq mi)
- Time zone: UTC+7 (ICT)
- Postal code: 36180
- Geocode: 3613

Khon San (Thai: คอนสาร, pronounced [kʰɔ̄ːn sǎːn]; Northeastern Thai: คอนสาร, pronounced [kʰɔ̂ːn sǎːn]) is the northernmost district (amphoe) of Chaiyaphum province, northeastern Thailand.

== History ==
In the early of the Rattanakosin era at the end of the 18th century, Mr. Phumi led the people from Mueang Nakhon Thai district, a subordinate of Phitsanulok, to establish their new town in this area. Mr. Phumi who was the town leader sent tribute to King Rama I. The king promoted him to be Muen Aram Kamhaeng and Luang Phichit Songkhram later, the first governor position of Khon San.

As the way from Bangkok to Khon San was so long, government officers had to carry royal command documents (Thai: San สาร) by a wooden bar on their shoulders. This method of carrying is called khon (คอน) in Thai.

In the reign of King Rama V, the town was downgraded to be a subdistrict of Phu Khiao district. On 16 August 1958 it was again separated from Phu Khiao and became a minor district (king amphoe), then containing the three tambons Khon San, Nun Khun, and Thung Phra. It was upgraded to a full district on 10 December 1959.

== Geography ==
Neighboring districts are (from the north clockwise): Phu Pha Man and Chum Phae of Khon Kaen province; Phu Khiao, Kaset Sombun, and Nong Bua Daeng of Chaiyaphum Province; Mueang Phetchabun, Lom Sak, and Nam Nao of Phetchabun province.

In the south of the district is the Phu Khiao Wildlife Sanctuary. The Chulabhorn Dam creates an artificial lake on the Nam Phrom River, covering about 12 km^{2}. The 700 metre long, 70 metre high dam was finished in 1973 and is used for generating hydroelectric power.

Khon San is a fertile district because there are many springs with water springing throughout the year.

== Administration ==
=== Central administration ===
Khon San is divided into eight subdistricts (tambons), which are further subdivided into 85 administrative villages (mubans).

No.	Name	Thai	Villages	Pop.
1.	Khon San	คอนสาร	9	8,392
2.	Thung Phra	ทุ่งพระ	10	5,600
3.	Non Khun	โนนคูณ	11	7,901
4.	Huai Yang	ห้วยยาง	19	15,493
5.	Thung Luilai	ทุ่งลุยลาย	7	6,162
6.	Dong Bang	ดงบัง	9	5,540
7.	Thung Na Lao	ทุ่งนาเลา	11	6,543
8.	Dong Klang	ดงกลาง	9	6,406

=== Local administration ===
There are three subdistrict municipalities (thesaban tambons) in the district:

- Khon San (Thai: เทศบาลตำบลคอนสาร) consisting of parts of subdistricts Khon San and Dong Bang.
- Huai Yang (Thai: เทศบาลตำบลห้วยยาง) consisting of subdistrict Huai Yang.
- Thung Luilai (Thai: เทศบาลตำบลทุ่งลุยลาย) consisting of subdistrict Thung Luilai.

There are six subdistrict administrative organizations (SAO) in the district:

- Khon San (Thai: องค์การบริหารส่วนตำบลคอนสาร) consisting of parts of subdistrict Khon San.
- Thung Phra (Thai: องค์การบริหารส่วนตำบลทุ่งพระ) consisting of subdistrict Thung Phra.
- Non Khun (Thai: องค์การบริหารส่วนตำบลโนนคูณ) consisting of subdistrict Non Khun.
- Dong Bang (Thai: องค์การบริหารส่วนตำบลดงบัง) consisting of parts of subdistrict Dong Bang.
- Thung Na Lao (Thai: องค์การบริหารส่วนตำบลทุ่งนาเลา) consisting of subdistrict Thung Na Lao.
- Dong Klang (Thai: องค์การบริหารส่วนตำบลดงกลาง) consisting of subdistrict Dong Klang.

== Economy ==
Areca nut is an important cash crop of the district.
