= Thep Sathit district =

Thep Sathit เทพสถิต
- District
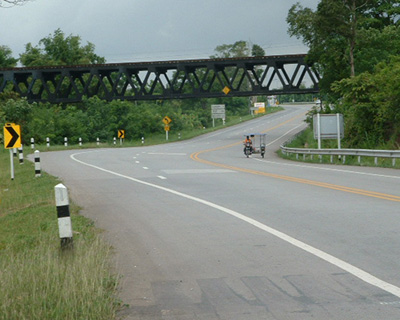
- The railway bridge of northeastern rail route crosses over Suranarai Road in Thep Sathit

- District location in Chaiyaphum province
- Coordinates: 15°23′30″N 101°27′0″E
- Country: Thailand
- Province: Chaiyaphum
- Seat: Wa Tabaek

Area
  - Total: 875.6 km^{2} (338.1 sq mi)

Population (2005)
  - Total: 65,735
  - Density: 75.1/km^{2} (195/sq mi)
- Time zone: UTC+7 (ICT)
- Postal code: 36230
- Geocode: 3609

Thep Sathit (Thai: เทพสถิต, pronounced [tʰêːp sā.tʰìt]; Northeastern Thai: เทพสถิต, pronounced [tʰêːp sā.tʰȉt]) is a district (amphoe) in the southwestern part of Chaiyaphum province, eastern Thailand.

== History ==
The minor district (king amphoe) Thep Sathit was created on 1 November 1976, when the three tambons Wa Tabaek, Na Yang Klak, and Huai Yai Chio were split off from Bamnet Narong district. On 1 April 1983 it was upgraded to a full district.

== Geography ==
The western boundary of the district is formed by the steep Phang Hoei ridge, with its highest elevation at the Sut Phaen Din, 846 m above sea level. To the east the terrain descends slowly towards the Khorat Plateau. Pa Hin Ngam National Park, famous for its Siam tulip fields, is in the western hills of this district.

Neighboring districts are (from the north clockwise): Phakdi Chumphon, Nong Bua Rawe, Sap Yai, Bamnet Narong of Chaiyaphum Province; Thepharak of Nakhon Ratchasima province; Lam Sonthi of Lopburi province; and Wichian Buri of Phetchabun province.

== Administration ==
The district is divided into five subdistricts (tambons), which are further subdivided into 84 villages (mubans). Thep Sathit has township (thesaban tambon) status and covers part of the tambon Wa Tabaek. There are a further five tambon administrative organizations (TAO).

| No. | Name | Thai name | Villages | Pop. |
|---|---|---|---|---|
| 1. | Wa Tabaek | วะตะแบก | 20 | 15,472 |
| 2. | Huai Yai Chio | ห้วยยายจิ๋ว | 20 | 13,939 |
| 3. | Na Yang Klak | นายางกลัก | 15 | 13,347 |
| 4. | Ban Rai | บ้านไร่ | 15 | 11,515 |
| 5. | Pong Nok | โป่งนก | 14 | 11,462 |
