= Tat Ton National Park =

National park in Thailand

- อุทยานแห่งชาติตาดโตน
- IUCN category II (national park)
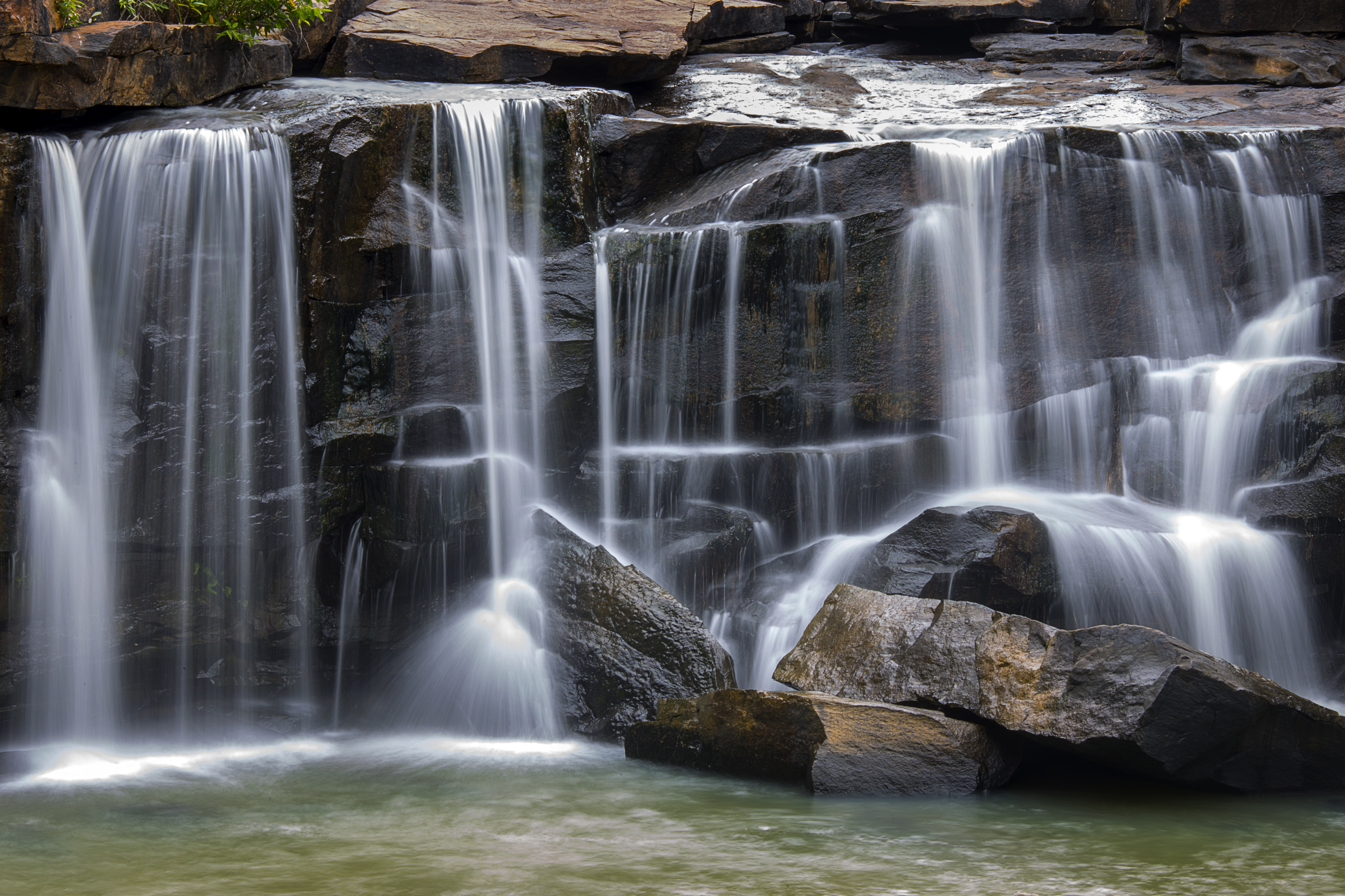
- Tat Ton waterfall
- Interactive map of Tat Ton National Park
- Location: Chaiyaphum Province, Thailand
- Nearest city: Chaiyaphum
- Coordinates: 15°59′16″N 102°2′29″E
- Area: 217 km^{2} (84 sq mi)
- Established: December 1980
- Visitors: 388,665 (in 2019)
- Governing body: Department of National Parks, Wildlife and Plant Conservation (DNP)

Tat Ton National Park (Thai: อุทยานแห่งชาติตาดโตน) is a national park in Chaiyaphum Province, Thailand. The park is in the Laen Kha mountain range. It features waterfalls and mountain highland scenery. On 31 December 1980, Tat Ton was designated Thailand's 23rd national park.

== Geography ==
Tat Ton National Park is 23 kilometres (14 mi) north of Chaiyaphum town in Mueang Chaiyaphum District. The park's area is 135,737 rai ~ 217 square kilometres (84 sq mi).

The park encompasses three peaks of the Laen Kha mountains: Phu Kaset, Phu Dee, and Phu Youk.

== Attractions ==
The park's most popular attraction is Tat Ton waterfall, 6 metres (20 ft) high but expanding to 50 metres (160 ft) width during the rainy season months from May to October. Other waterfalls in the park include Tat Fa, Pha Lang and Pha Song Chan.

== Flora and fauna ==
The park's forests are dipterocarp and dry evergreen. Tree species include Shorea roxburghii, Shorea obtusa, Dipterocarpus tuberculatus, Irvingia malayana, Calophyllum polyanthum, Shorea siamensis, Xylia xylocarpa, Sindora siamensis, Garcinia celebica, Dalbergia oliveri, Memecylon ovatum and Vietnamosasa pusilla.

Animal species include barking deer, wild pig, mongoose and Siamese hare.

== Location ==
Tat Ton National Park in overview PARO 7 (Nakhon Ratchasima)

4) Tat Ton National Park in overview PARO 7 (Nakhon Ratchasima)

	National park
1	Pa Hin Ngam
2	Phu Laenkha
3	Sai Thong
4	Tat Ton
	Wildlife sanctuary
5	Dong Yai
6	Pha Phueng
7	Phu Khiao

	Non-hunting area
8	Angkepnam Huai Chorakhe Mak
9	Angkepnam Huai Talat
10	Angkepnam Sanambin
11	Bueng Lahan
12	Khao Phaeng Ma
13	Lam Nang Rong
14	Nong Waeng
15	Pa Khao Phu Luang
16	Phu Khao Fai Kradong

	Forest park
17	Khao Kradong

== See also ==
- List of national parks of Thailand
- List of Protected Areas Regional Offices of Thailand
