= Ban Khwao district =

Ban Khwao บ้านเขว้า
- District
- District location in Chaiyaphum province
- Coordinates: 15°46′42″N 101°54′25″E
- Country: Thailand
- Province: Chaiyaphum

Area
  - Total: 544.3 km^{2} (210.2 sq mi)

Population (2008)
  - Total: 51,277
  - Density: 94.2/km^{2} (244/sq mi)
- Time zone: UTC+7 (ICT)
- Postal code: 36170
- Geocode: 3602

Ban Khwao (Thai: บ้านเขว้า, pronounced [bâːn kʰwâw]; Northeastern Thai: บ้านเขว้า, pronounced [bâːn kʰwàw]) is a district (amphoe) of Chaiyaphum province, northeastern Thailand. It is a region known for its quality Thai silk.

== History ==
In 1806, people from Ban Khao (Thai: บ้านข่าว, RTGS: Ban Khao) in Nakhon Ratchasima province migrated to the area of modern-day Ban Khwao District. When their new settlement proved to be successful, they sent the 'good news' (Thai: ข่าว, RTGS: khao) to their relatives in the old village. The new community flourished, and the people agreed to name the new village Ban Khwao (lit. 'village of good news') to commemorate its history.

The area was made a minor district on 1 January 1955, when the two subdistricts Ban Khwao and Talat Raeng were split off from Mueang Chaiyaphum District. It was upgraded to a full district on 23 July 1957.

== Geography ==
Neighboring districts are (from the north clockwise): Nong Bua Daeng, Mueang Chaiyaphum, Noen Sa-nga, Chatturat and Nong Bua Rawe.

== Administration ==
The district is divided into six subdistricts (tambons), which are further subdivided into 94 villages (mubans). The township (thesaban tambon) Ban Khwao covers four villages of tambon Ban Khwao.

No.	Name	Thai	Villages	Pop.
1.	Ban Khwao	บ้านเขว้า	18	15,131
2.	Talat Raeng	ตลาดแร้ง	28	11,549
3.	Lum Lamchi	ลุ่มลำชี	22	9,808
4.	Chi Bon	ชีบน	10	5,852
5.	Phu Laen Kha	ภูแลนคา	8	4,299
6.	Non Daeng	โนนแดง	8	4,667
