= Chaiyaphum province =

Coordinates: 15°48′28″N 102°1′59″E

Chaiyaphum ชัยภูมิ
- Province
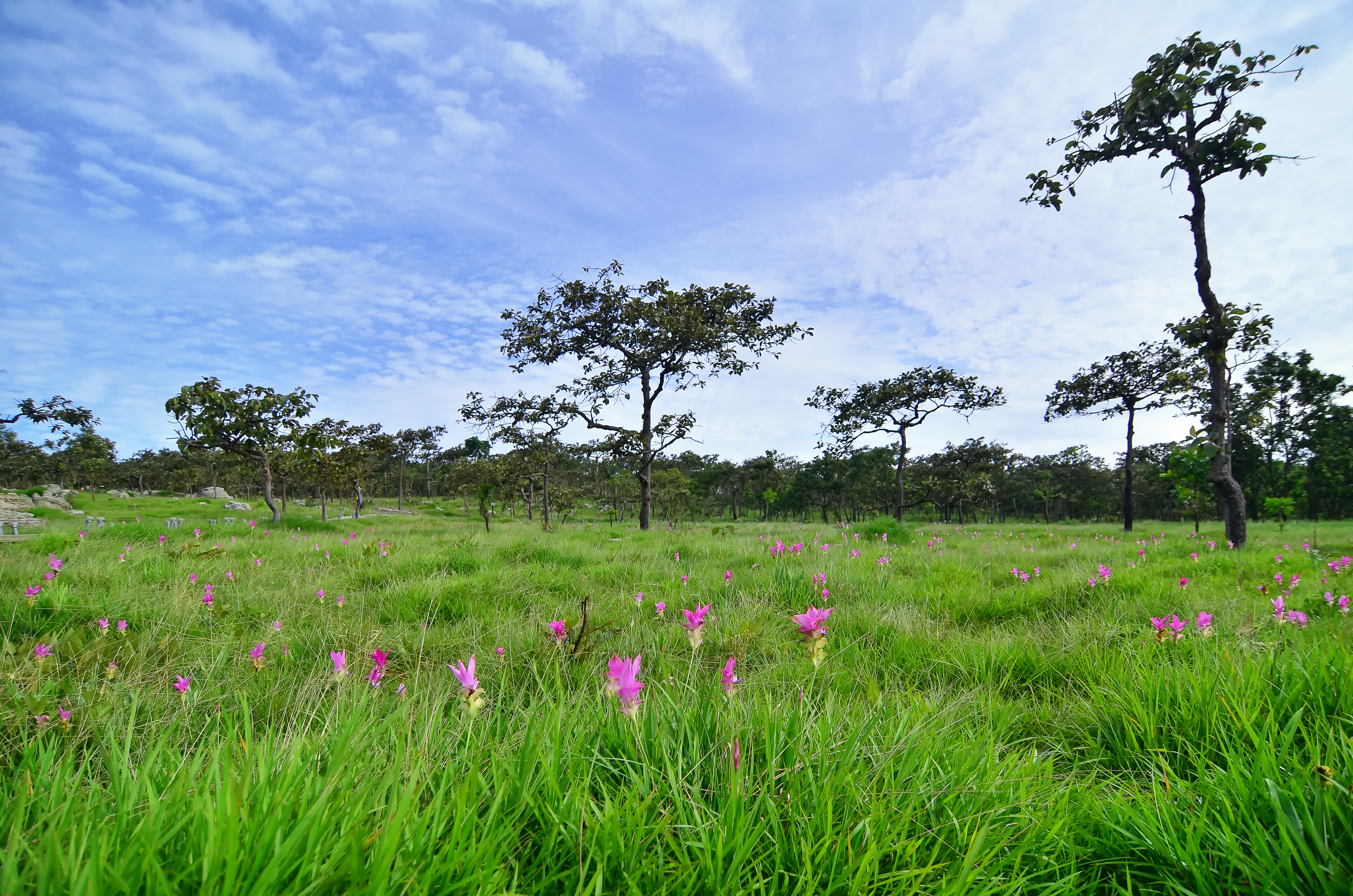
- Pa Hin Ngam National Park

- Flag Seal
- Motto: ชัยภูมิ เมืองผู้กล้า พญาแล ("Chaiyaphum. City of the brave and Phaya Lae.")
- Map of Thailand highlighting Chaiyaphum province
- Country: Thailand
- Capital: Chaiyaphum

Government
  - Type: Province and Provincial Administrative Organization
  - Body: Chaiyaphum Province and Chaiyaphum Provincial Administrative Organization
  - Governor: Anan Nakniyom
  - PAO Chief Executive: Sureewan Nakasai

Area
  - Total: 12,698 km^{2} (4,903 sq mi)
  - Rank: 8th

Population (2024)
  - Total: ▼1,106,404
  - Rank: 19th
  - Density: 87/km^{2} (230/sq mi)
  - Rank: 53rd

Human Achievement Index
  - HAI (2022): 0.6318 "somewhat low" Ranked 50th

GDP
  - Total: baht 60 billion (US$2.1 billion) (2019)
- Time zone: UTC+7 (ICT)
- Postal code: 36xxx
- Calling code: 044
- ISO 3166 code: TH-36
- Website: chaiyaphum.go.th chpao.org

Chaiyaphum (Thai: ชัยภูมิ, pronounced [tɕʰāj.jā.pʰūːm]; Northeastern Thai: ไซยภูมิ, pronounced [sa᷇j.jā.pʰu᷇ːm]) is one of Thailand's seventy-six provinces (changwat), located in central northeastern Thailand, also called Isan. Neighboring provinces are (from north clockwise) Khon Kaen, Nakhon Ratchasima, Lopburi, and Phetchabun.

== Toponymy ==
The word chaiya originates from the Sanskrit word jaya meaning 'victory', and the word phum from Sanskrit bhumi meaning 'earth' or 'land'. Hence the name of the province literally means 'land of victory'. The Malay/Indonesian/Sanskrit word jayabumi is equivalent.

== Geography ==
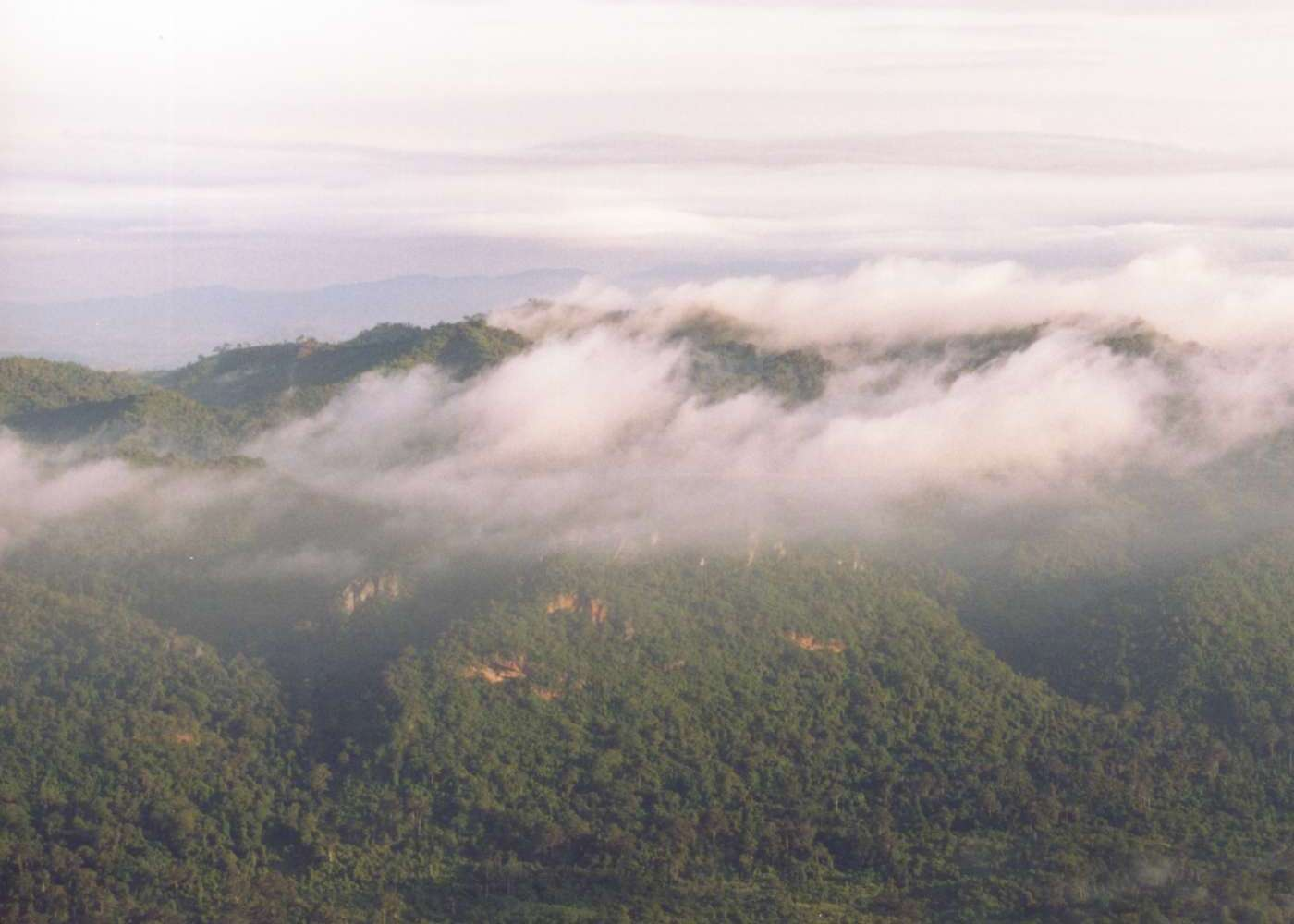
The Luak ridge of the Phetchabun Mountains and the Sonthi River valley, from the Sut Phaen Din viewpoint of Pa Hin Ngam National Park.

The province is bisected by the Phetchabun mountain range, with the highest elevation in the province at 1,222 m. The east of the province is part of the Khorat Plateau. The total forest area is 3,982 km^{2} (1,537 sq mi) or 31.4 percent of provincial area.

Tat Ton National Park is in the northwest, featuring some scenic waterfalls and dry dipterocarp forests. The biggest attraction of the Sai Thong National Park in the west is the Sai Thong waterfall, but also some fields of the Siam tulip. Similar fields can be found in the Pa Hin Ngam National Park in the southwest. This park's name ('beautiful rock forest') derives from the strangely shaped rock formations found there. Phu Laenkha National Park covers 200 km^{2} of forested hills northwest of Chaiyaphum city.

=== National parks ===
The province has six national parks. Four fall in region 7 (Nakhon Ratchasima) of Thailand's protected areas, Nam Nao in region 11 (Phitsanulok) and Nam Phong in region 8 (Khon Kaen). (Visitors in fiscal year 2024)

| Nam Nao National Park | 966 km^{2} (373 sq mi) | (26,942) |
| Sai Thong National Park | 319 km^{2} (123 sq mi) | (69,603) |
| Tat Ton National Park | 217 km^{2} (84 sq mi) | (306,746) |
| Phu Laenkha National Park | 200 km^{2} (77 sq mi) | (126,476) |
| Nam Phong National Park | 197 km^{2} (76 sq mi) | (27,256) |
| Pa Hin Ngam National Park | 100 km^{2} (39 sq mi) | (164,374) |

=== Wildlife sanctuaries ===
The province has three wildlife sanctuaries. Two of them, with one further sanctuary, make up region 7 (Nakhon Ratchasima) of Thailand's protected areas; Tabo–Huai Yai belongs to region 11 (Phitsanulok).

| Phu Khiao Wildlife Sanctuary | 1,560 km^{2} (600 sq mi) |
| Tabo–Huai Yai Wildlife Sanctuary | 654 km^{2} (253 sq mi) |
| Pha Phueng Wildlife Sanctuary | 189 km^{2} (73 sq mi) |

Location protected areas of Chaiyaphum

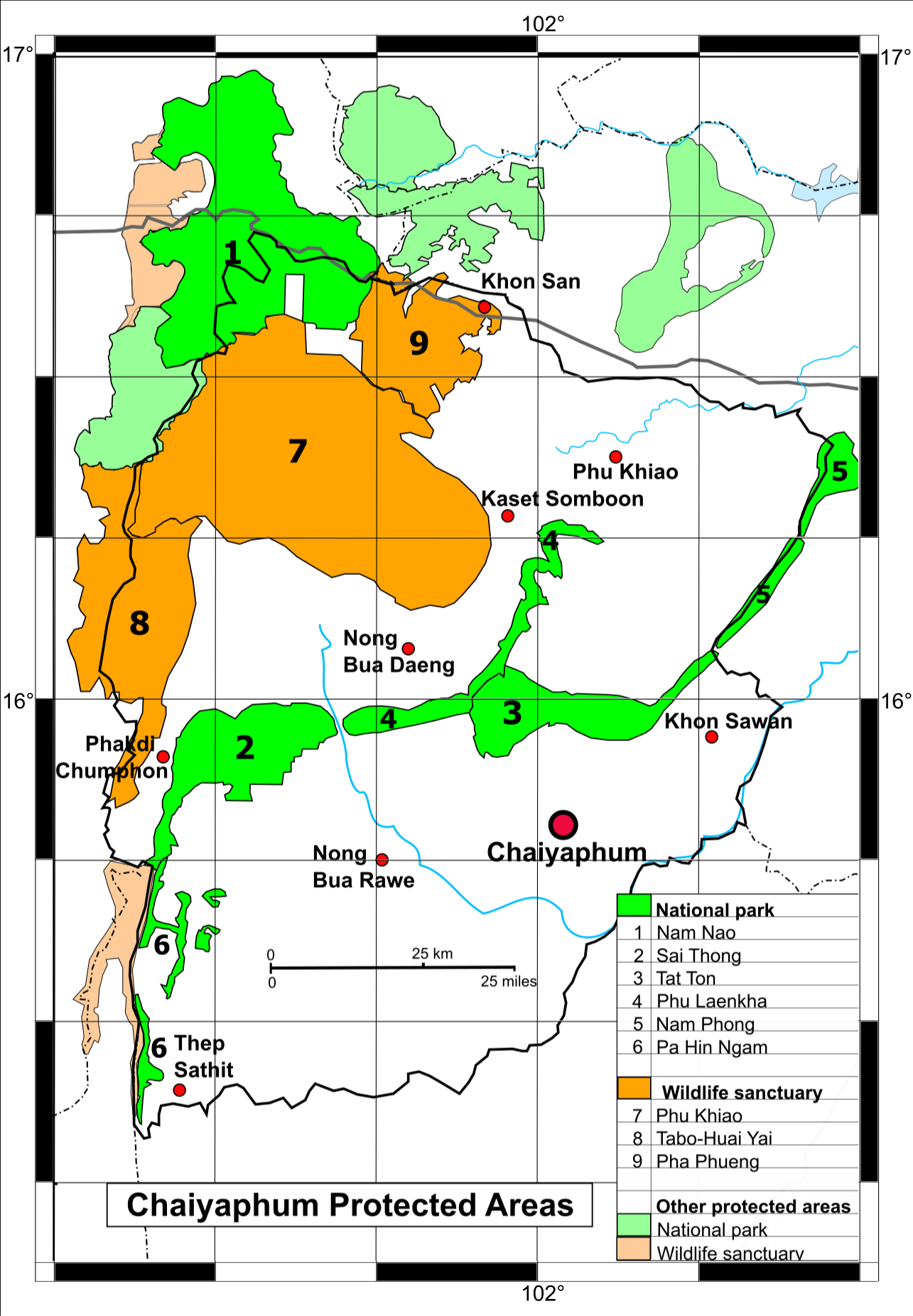
Chaiyaphum protected areas

| | National park |
| 1 | Nam Nao |
| 2 | Sai Thong |
| 3 | Tat Ton |
| 4 | Phu Laenkha |
| 5 | Nam Phong |
| 6 | Pa Hin Ngam |

| | Wildlife sanctuary |
| 7 | Phu Khiao |
| 8 | Tabo-Huai Yai |
| 9 | Pa Phueng |

== History ==
=== Early period ===
Two inscribed sema stones, Buddhist boundary markers, are recorded from Kaset Sombun district. K 404 was read in 1989 as praising Cuḍāmaṇī, a lady or queen of high rank on whose support the power and glory of the king's realm rested. That basis has been rejected, on the ground that nothing in the text supports even the proposal that Cuḍāmaṇī was the name of a person. A second stone from the district, in Sanskrit written in Khmer script, mentions a sugatapratimavuddhasima. The term has been read as a Buddha image set up inside a boundary marked by sema, rather than a space for monks to assemble in. It is now held at the Phimai National Museum in Nakhon Ratchasima province. K.404 is also described as a 7th- or 8th-century Sanskrit inscription with Mon characteristics, found at Nong Hin Tan, naming a king Jaya Singhavarman.

The city of Chaiyaphum is often said to date from the 12th century, when it is described as a small place on a route running west from Angkor towards Prasat Muang Sing in what is now Kanchanaburi province. (Note: A route is not by itself evidence of administration. The Preah Khan inscription of 1191 lists rest houses on the roads east to Champa and north to Vimāya, the modern Phimai, but names no road running west from the Angkorian capital. The text names a third route as well, a circuit through Jayavatī, Jayasiṃhavatī, Jayavāravatī, Jayarājagiri and Suvīrapurī which carries 44 of its 121 fire houses. Its editor locates none of the five places and gives the circuit no direction.) Seven Sanskrit inscriptions of śaka 1108, that is 1186, record hospital foundations of the Angkorian king Jayavarman VII (r. 1181–1218). They are numbered K.368, K.375, K.386, K.387, K.395, K.402 and K.952, and were found at sites in the Nakhon Ratchasima, Chaiyaphum and Surin regions, at Sai Fong on the Mekong, in what is now Laos, and near Ubon. One of the outliers of the group was found in this province. All of Jayavarman VII's hospital inscriptions open by invoking the same three deities, the medicine Buddha Bhaiṣajyaguru with Sūryavairocana and Candravairocana.

=== Modern history ===
Under Narai, who reigned from 1656 to 1688, Khorat was fortified and became the provincial centre for the parts of the plateau under Thai control, and Chaiyaphum is named among the five towns within its circle of power.

In 1817 the area was settled by Lao people led by Nai Lae, an official of King Anouvong of Vientiane, which was a tributary state of the Thai monarch. They settled in Baan Nam Khun Nong E Chan in Nakhon Ratchasima province, but soon abandoned it in favor of Ban Luang (today's city of Chaiyaphum). In 1826 Anouvong rebelled against the Thai King Rama III, seeking to gain complete independence. Nai Lae, by then made a chao praya by the Thai monarch, supported the Siamese troops. Chao Phaya Lae was killed defending his city against Anouvong's army, but Anouvong was defeated by Thai forces weeks later and Anouvong taken in chains to Bangkok. King Rama III remembered Chao Phaya Lae for his loyalty and awarded him the title Phraya Phakdi Chumpon. He is still a local hero and his statue has become a symbol of the province.

== People ==
Most people in Chaiyaphum province are ethnically Lao. The first language of most people is the Lao language. Nyah Kur, thought an offshoot of Old Mon, is spoken in about twenty-five villages in the Khorat, Phetchabun and Chaiyaphum provinces.

== Economy ==
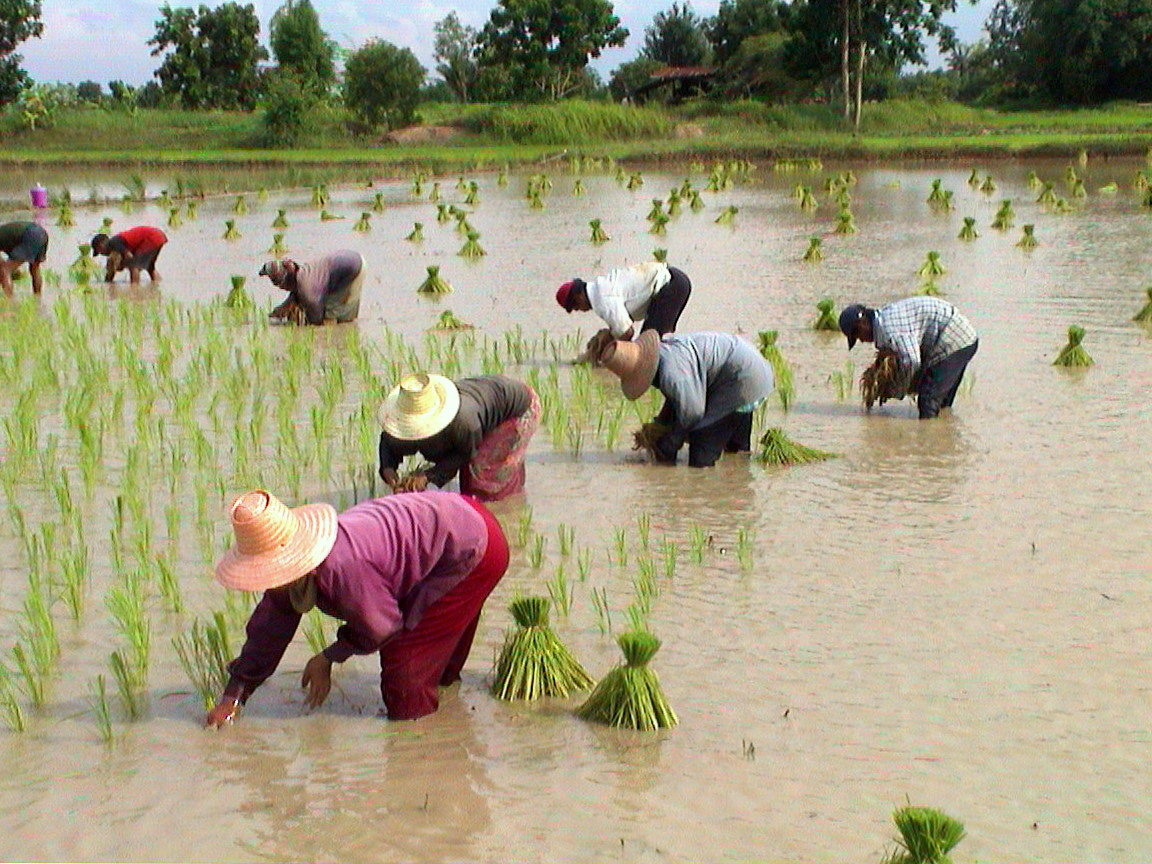
Rice, Chaiyaphum province

The principal crops of Chaiyaphum include rice, tapioca, sugar cane, and taro root. Chulabhorn Dam, in Thung Lui Lai Subdistrict, Khon San district is a major source of irrigation water. After the drought of 2019 the Royal Irrigation Department proposed three more dams in Chaiyaphum. They are Wang Saphung Dam in Nong Bua Daeng District, Lam Nam Chee Dam in Ban Khwao District, and Prong Khun Petch Dam in Nong Bua Rawe District. The dams would have a combined capacity of 160 million m^{3} of water, which could irrigate 127,000 rai of farmland.

== Health ==
Chaiyaphum Hospital is the main hospital of the province, operated by the Ministry of Public Health.

== Symbols ==
The provincial seal shows a triangular flag, a symbol of victory in war.

The provincial tree is the Siamese senna (Cassia siamea), and the provincial flower the Siam Tulip (Curcuma alismatifolia). The provincial aquatic life is the bronze featherback (Notopterus notopterus).

The provincial slogan เมืองโบราณ บ้านนักสู้ ภูเสียดฟ้า ป่าช้างหลาย ทุ่งไพรรก น้ำตกใส ผ้าไหมดี สตรีงาม แดนธรรมแดนทอง translates to 'Enchanted city, home to heroes, mountain peaks, elephant forests, waterfalls, beautiful silk, lovely ladies, conscientious Buddhists'.

== Administrative divisions ==
Map of sixteen districts

=== Provincial government ===
The province is divided into 16 districts (amphoes). The districts are further divided into 124 subdistricts (tambons) and 1393 villages (mubans).

1. Mueang Chaiyaphum
2. Ban Khwao
3. Khon Sawan
4. Kaset Sombun
5. Nong Bua Daeng
6. Chatturat
7. Bamnet Narong
8. Nong Bua Rawe
9. Thep Sathit
10. Phu Khiao
11. Ban Thaen
12. Kaeng Khro
13. Khon San
14. Phakdi Chumphon
15. Noen Sa-nga
16. Sap Yai

=== Local government ===
As of 26 November 2019 there are: one Chaiyaphum Provincial Administration Organisation (ongkan borihan suan changwat) and 36 municipal (thesaban) areas in the province. Chaiyaphum has town (thesaban mueang) status. Further 35 subdistrict municipalities (thesaban tambon). The non-municipal areas are administered by 106 Subdistrict Administrative Organisations - SAO (ongkan borihan suan tambon).

== Human achievement index 2022 ==
| Health | Education | Employment | Income |
| 69 | 57 | 34 | 27 |
| Housing | Family | Transport | Participation |
| 3 | 54 | 69 | 41 |
Province Chaiyphum, with an HAI 2022 value of 0.6318 is "somewhat low", occupies place 50 in the ranking.

Since 2003, United Nations Development Programme (UNDP) in Thailand has tracked progress on human development at sub-national level with the Human achievement index (HAI), a composite index covering eight key areas. The National Economic and Social Development Board (NESDB) took over this task in 2017.

| Rank | Classification |
| 1–13 | "High" |
| 14–29 | "Somewhat high" |
| 30–45 | "Average" |
| 46–61 | "Somewhat low" |
| 62–77 | "Low" |

Map with provinces and HAI 2022 rankings

== Gallery ==
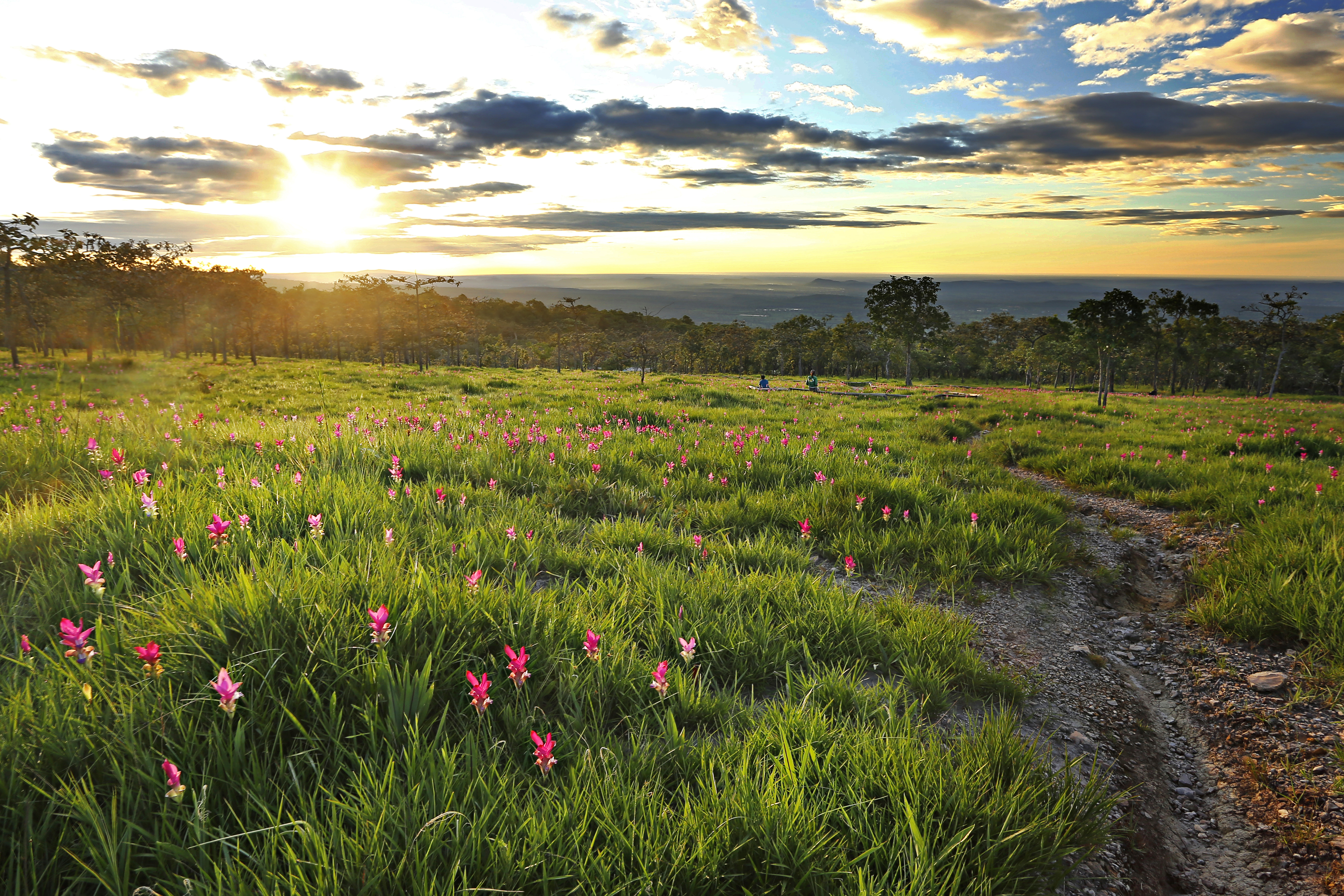
Sai Thong National Park

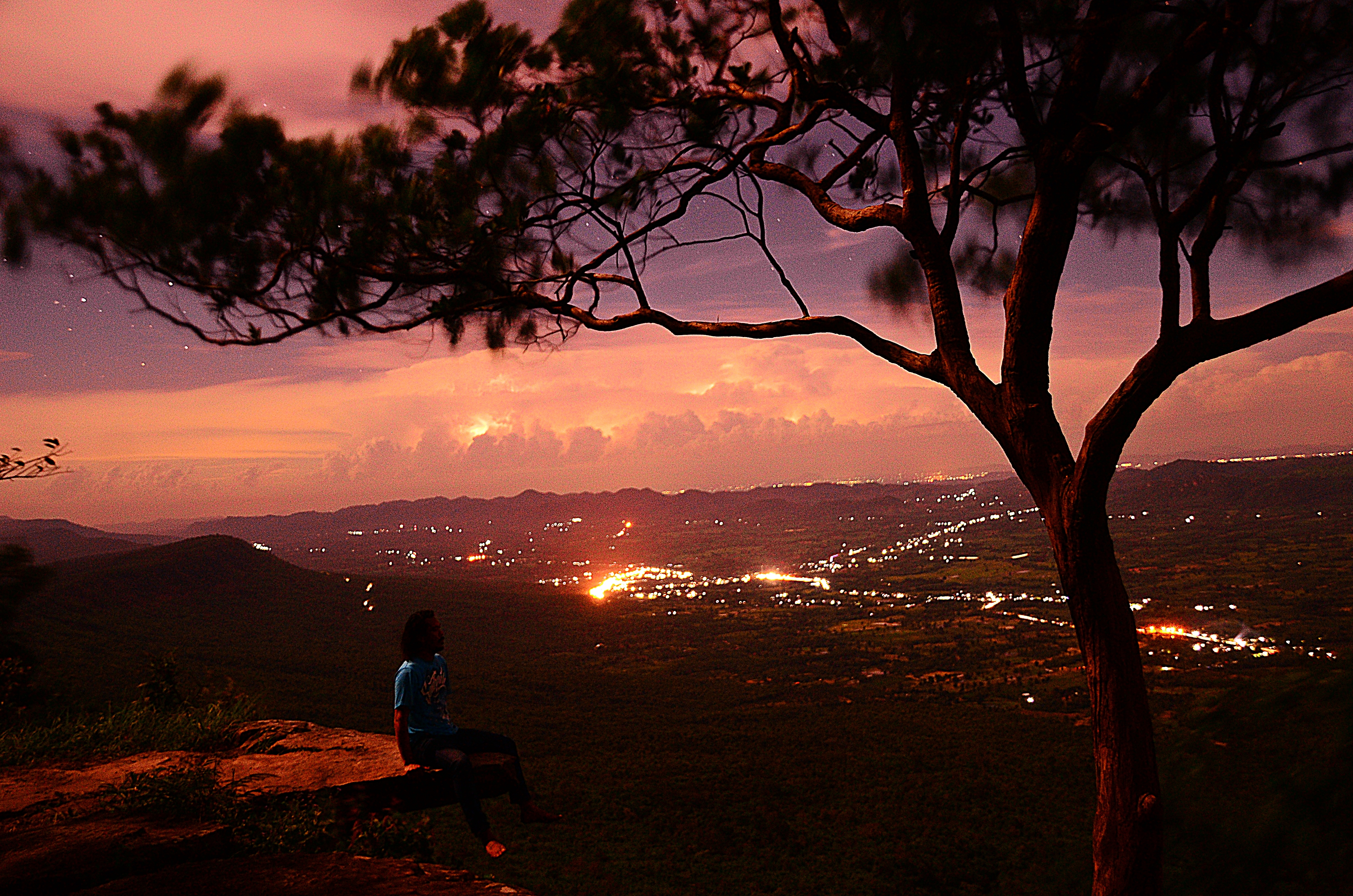
Pha Ham Hot, Sai Thong National Park

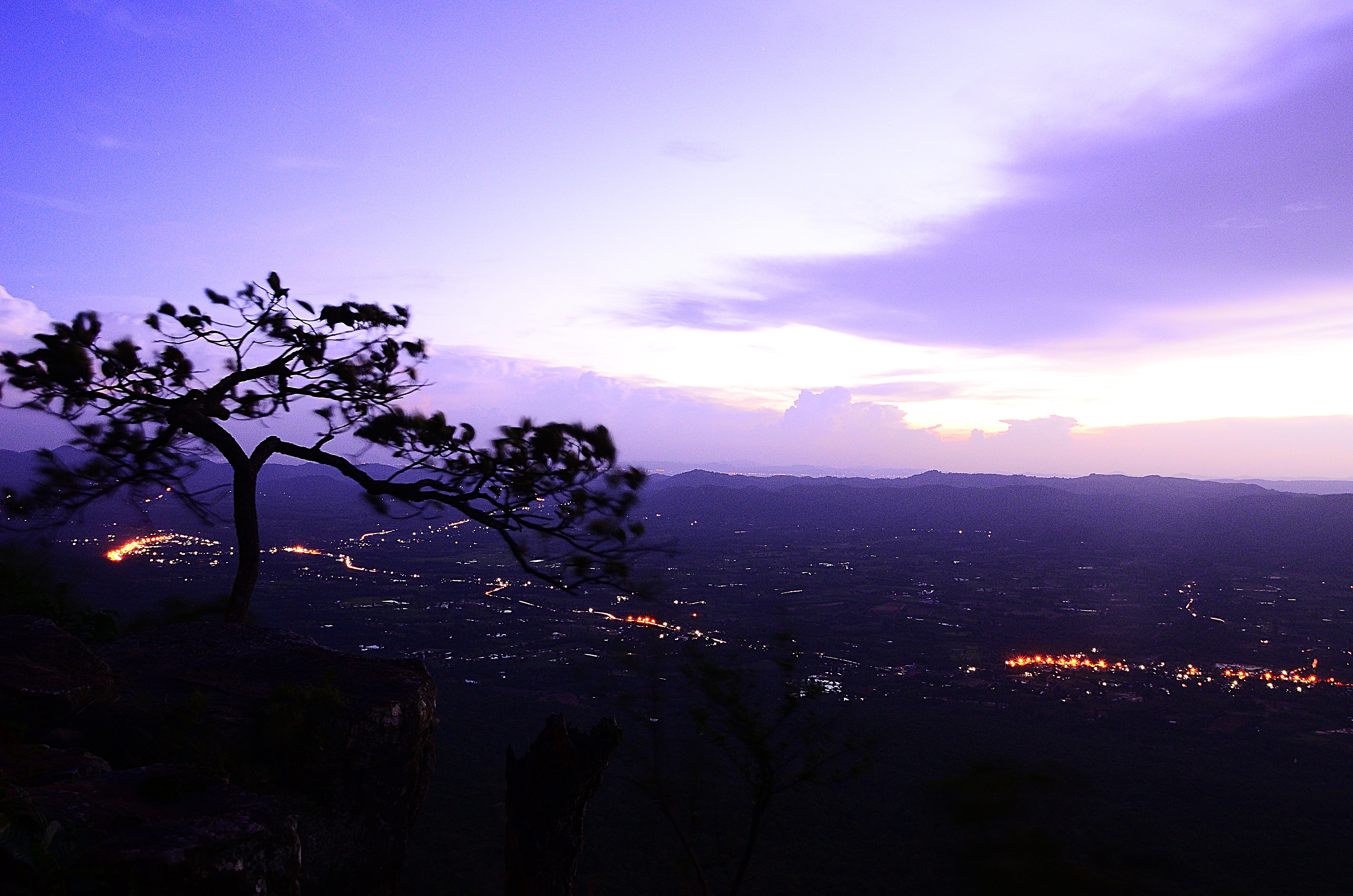
Pha Ham Hot, Sai Thong National Park

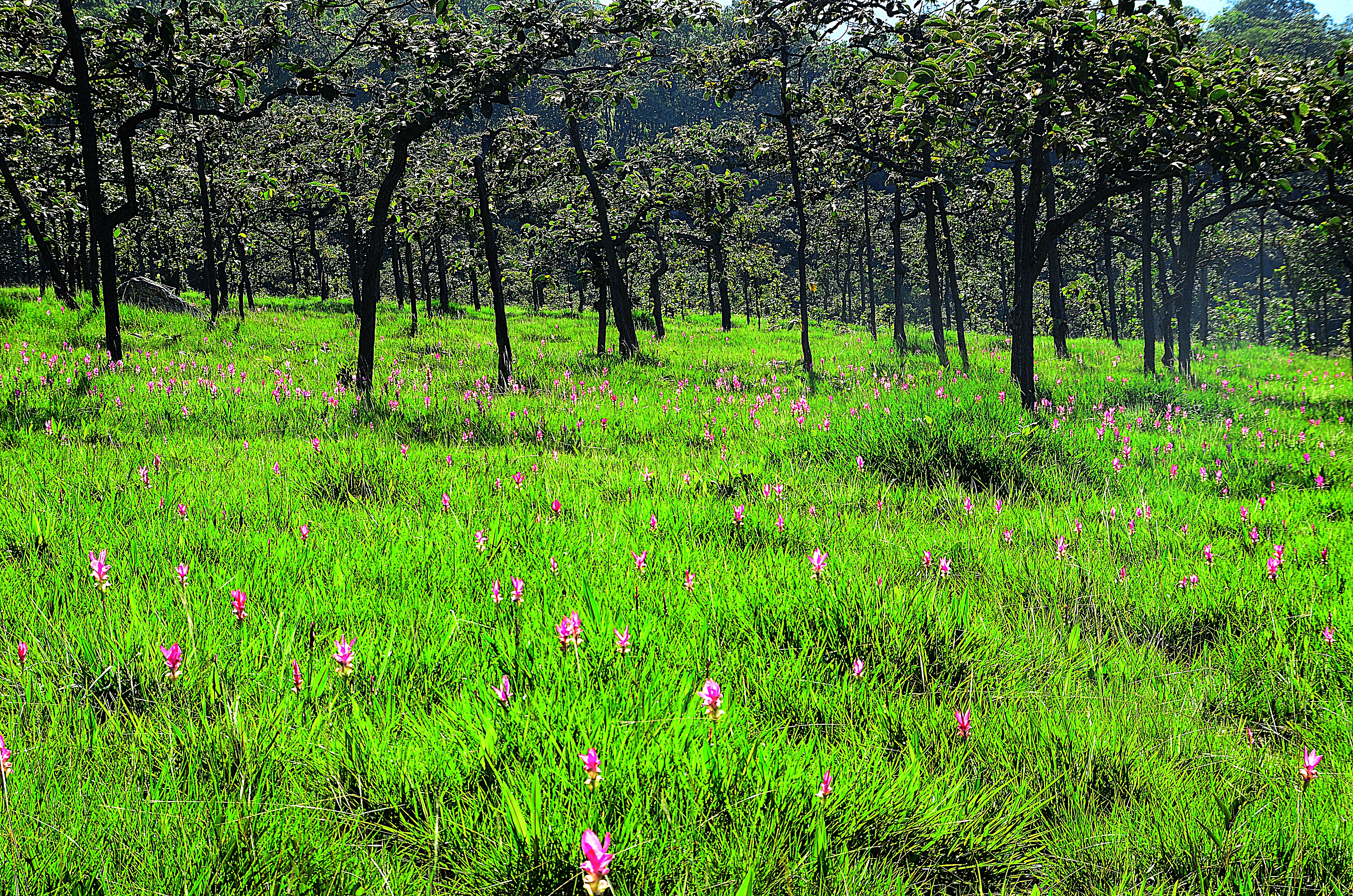
Pathumma (Curcuma alismatifolia), Sai Thong National Park

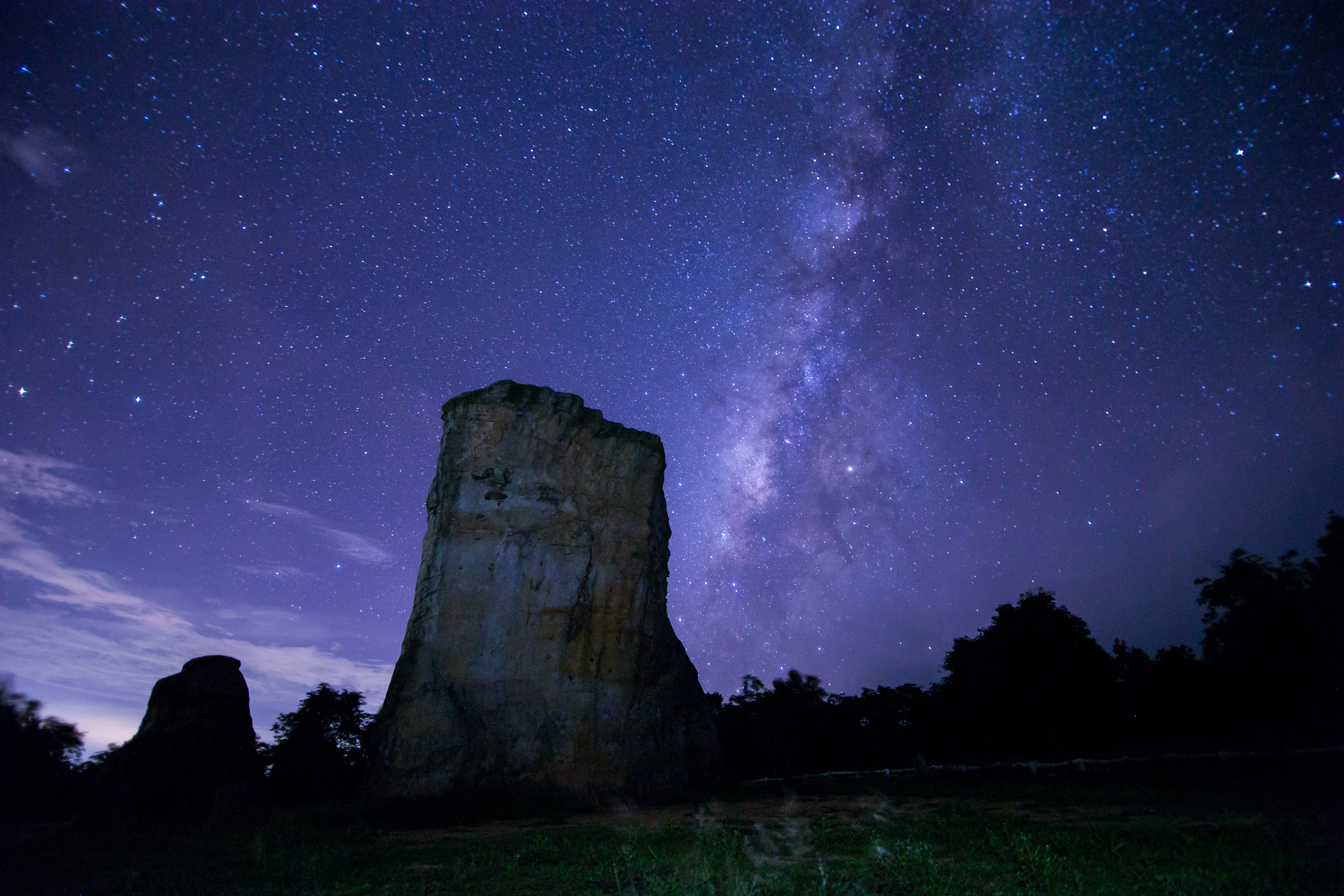
Phu Laen Kha National Park

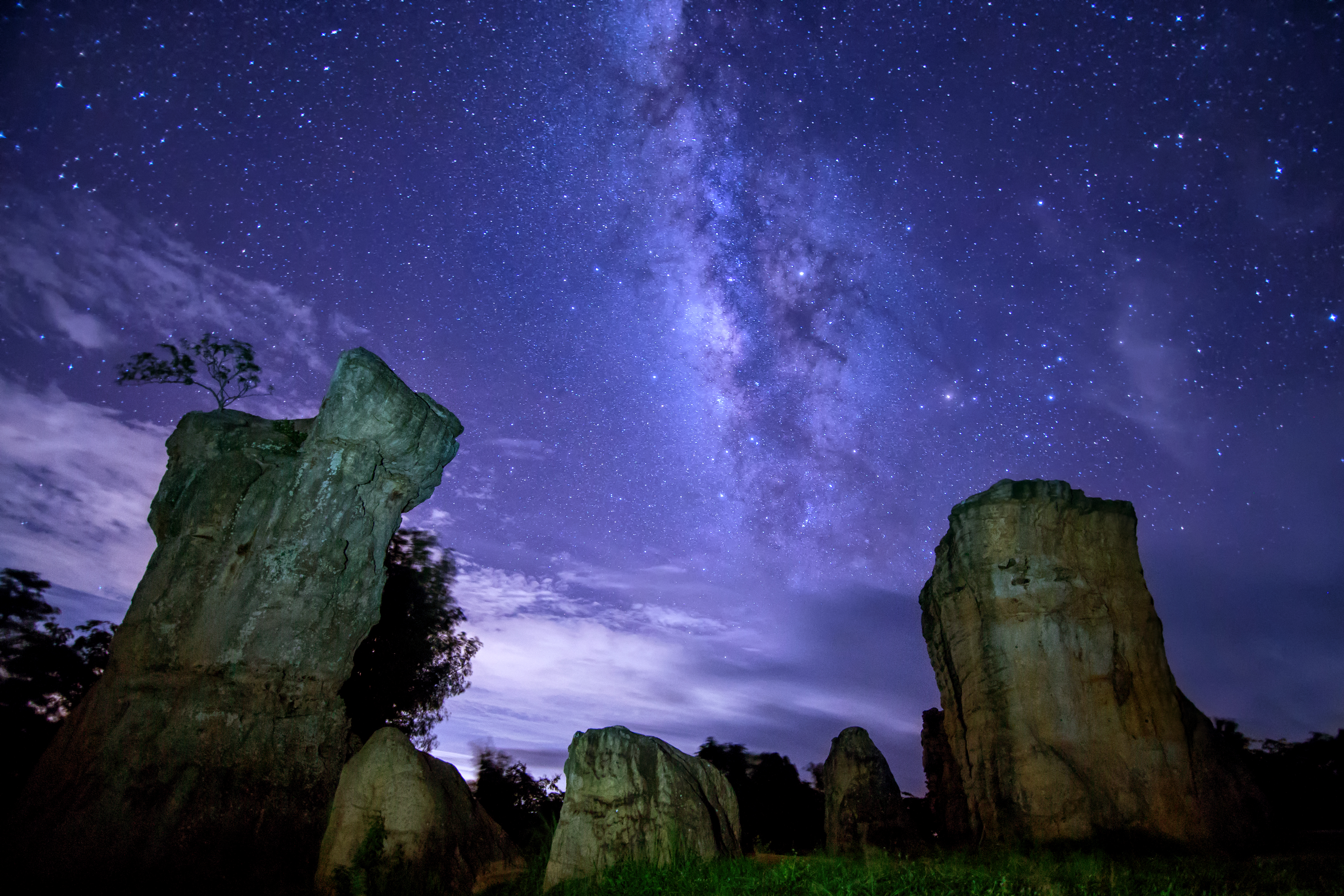
Phu Laen Kha National Park

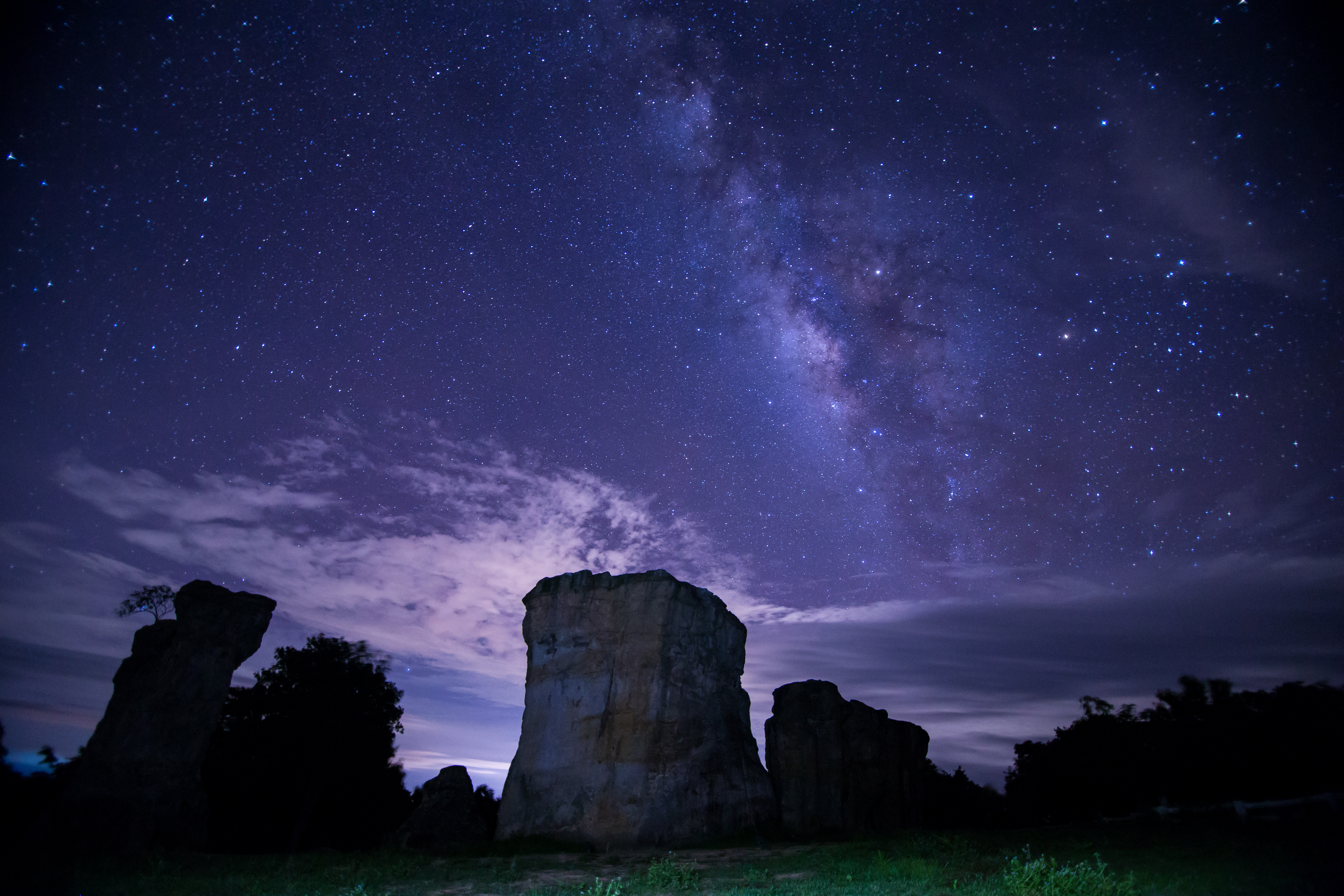
Phu Laen Kha National Park

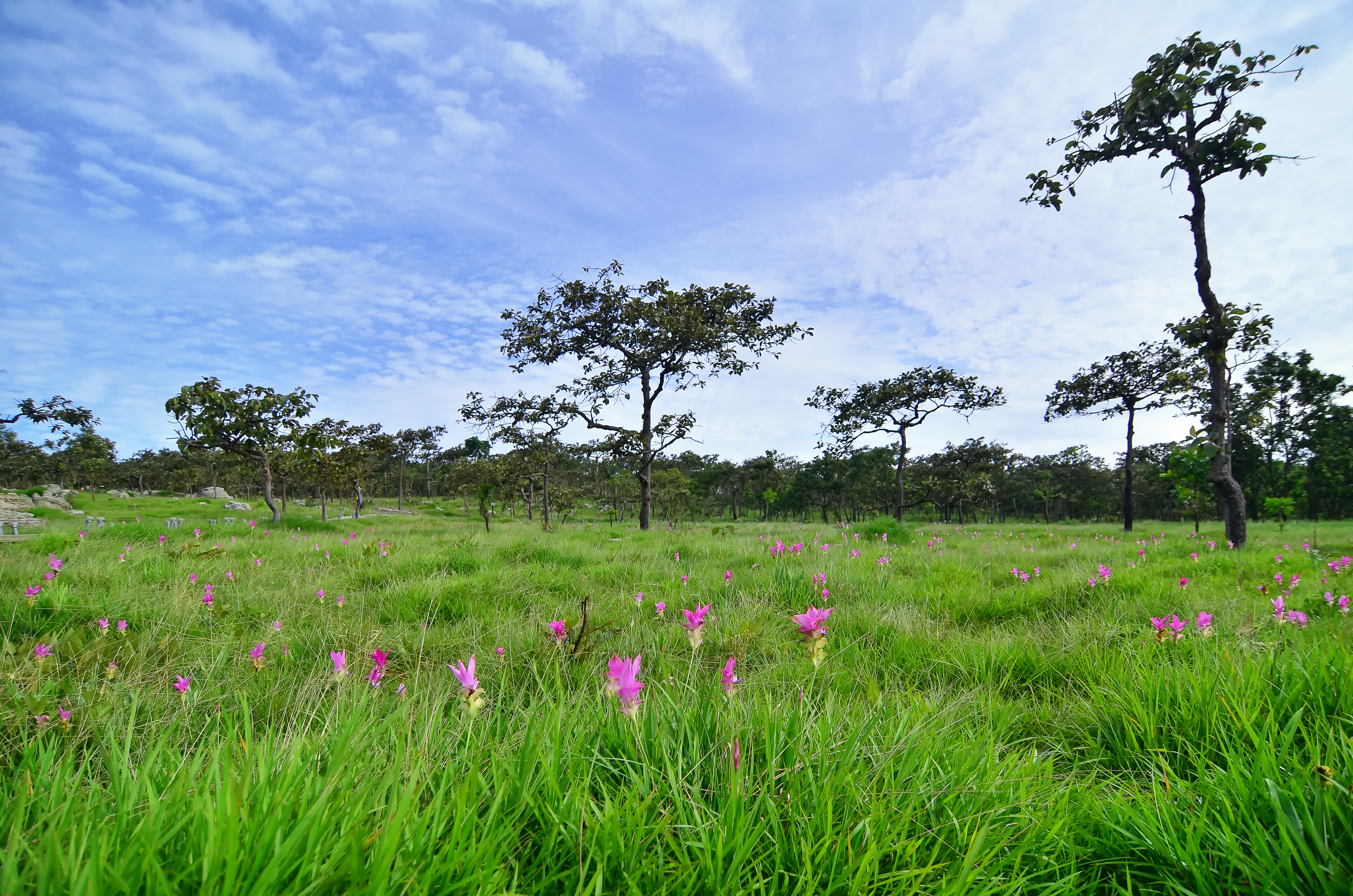
Pathumma (Curcuma alismatifolia), Pa Hin Ngam National Park

== See also ==
- Khit cloth
