= Kaset Sombun district =

Kaset Sombun เกษตรสมบูรณ์
- District
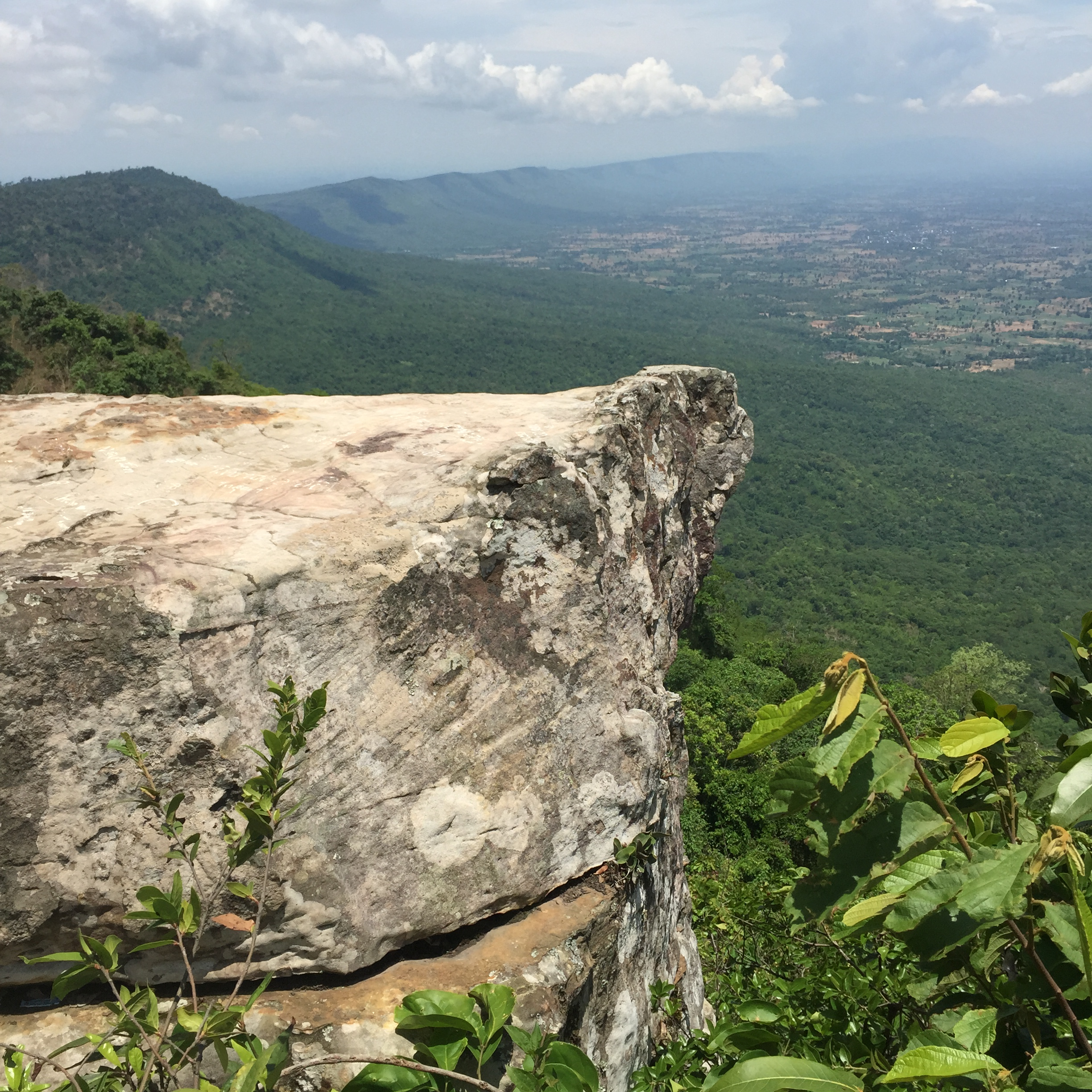
- Phu Laen Kha National Park

- District location in Chaiyaphum province
- Coordinates: 16°16′49″N 101°57′14″E
- Country: Thailand
- Province: Chaiyaphum
- Seat: Ban Yang

Area
  - Total: 1,419.0 km^{2} (547.9 sq mi)

Population (2007)
  - Total: 110,382
  - Density: 77.8/km^{2} (202/sq mi)
- Time zone: UTC+7 (ICT)
- Postal code: 36120
- Geocode: 3604

Kaset Sombun (Thai: เกษตรสมบูรณ์, pronounced [kā.sèːt sǒm.būːn]; Northeastern Thai: เกษตรสมบูรณ์, pronounced [kā.sèːt sǒm.bùːn]) is a district (amphoe) in the northern part of Chaiyaphum province, northeastern Thailand.

== History ==
Originally, Kaset Sombun was a minor district under Phu Khio District. In 1917 the minor district's name was changed from Kaset Sombun to Ban Yang, the name of the central tambon. On 1 March 1939 the minor district was upgraded to a full district and given back its historical name, Kaset Sombun.

== Geography ==
Neighbouring districts are (from the north clockwise) Khon San, Phu Khiao, Kaeng Khro, Mueang Chaiyaphum and Nong Bua Daeng.

To the north of the district is the Phu Khiao Wildlife Reserve. Phu Laen Kha National Park is in the three southeastern tambons of the district, and continues to the southwest to Mueang and Nong Bua Daeng Districts.

== Administration ==
The district is divided into 11 subdistricts (tambons), which are further subdivided into 144 villages (mubans). There are two subdistrict municipalities (thesaban tambons): Kaset Sombun covers parts of tambon Ban Yang and Ban Pao parts of the same-named tambon. There are a further 11 tambon administrative organizations (TAO).

No.	Name	Thai	Pop.
1.	Ban Yang	บ้านยาง	12,294
2.	Ban Han	บ้านหัน	13,529
3.	Ban Duea	บ้านเดื่อ	15,025
4.	Ban Pao	บ้านเป้า	10,840
5.	Kut Lo	กุดเลาะ	7,207
6.	Non Kok	โนนกอก	10,166
7.	Sa Phon Thong	สระโพนทอง	8,320
8.	Nong Kha	หนองข่า	8,255
9.	Nong Phon Ngam	หนองโพนงาม	12,489
10.	Ban Bua	บ้านบัว	4,867
12.	Non Thong	โนนทอง	7,390

Geocode 11 belongs to Sap Si Thong, which was reassigned to Mueang Chaiyaphum District in 2003.
