= Chatturat district =

Chatturat จัตุรัส
- District
- District location in Chaiyaphum province
- Coordinates: 15°33′56″N 101°50′44″E
- Country: Thailand
- Province: Chaiyaphum

Area
  - Total: 731.0 km^{2} (282.2 sq mi)

Population (2007)
  - Total: 75,948
  - Density: 102/km^{2} (260/sq mi)
- Time zone: UTC+7 (ICT)
- Postal code: 36130
- Geocode: 3606

Chatturat (Thai: จัตุรัส, pronounced [tɕàt.tùʔ.ràt]; Northeastern Thai: จัตุรัส, pronounced [tɕǎt.tǔʔ.lát]) is a district (amphoe) of Chaiyaphum province, northeastern Thailand.

== Administration ==
The district is divided into nine sub-districts (tambons).
