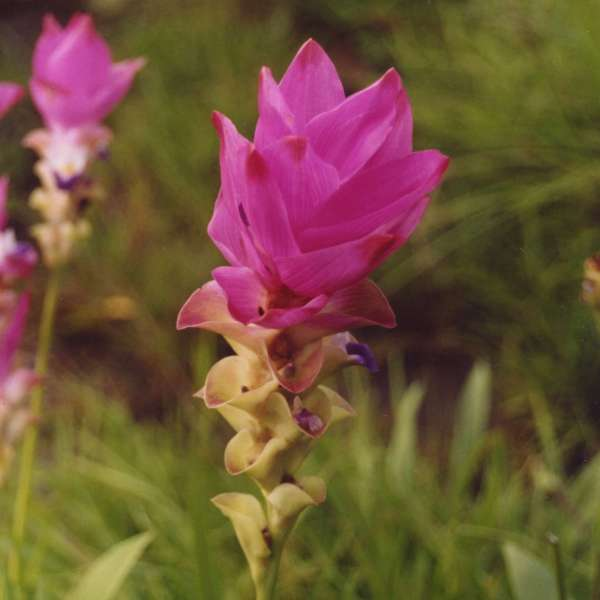

Conservation status
- Near Threatened (IUCN 3.1)

Scientific classification
- Kingdom: Plantae
- Clade: Embryophytes
- Clade: Tracheophytes
- Clade: Spermatophytes
- Clade: Angiosperms
- Clade: Monocots
- Clade: Commelinids
- Order: Zingiberales
- Family: Zingiberaceae
- Genus: Curcuma
- Species: C. alismatifolia

Binomial name
- Curcuma alismatifolia Gagnep.

Synonyms
- Hitcheniopsis alismatifolia (Gagnep.) Loes. in H.G.A.Engler

= Curcuma alismatifolia =

Siam tulip

Species of plant

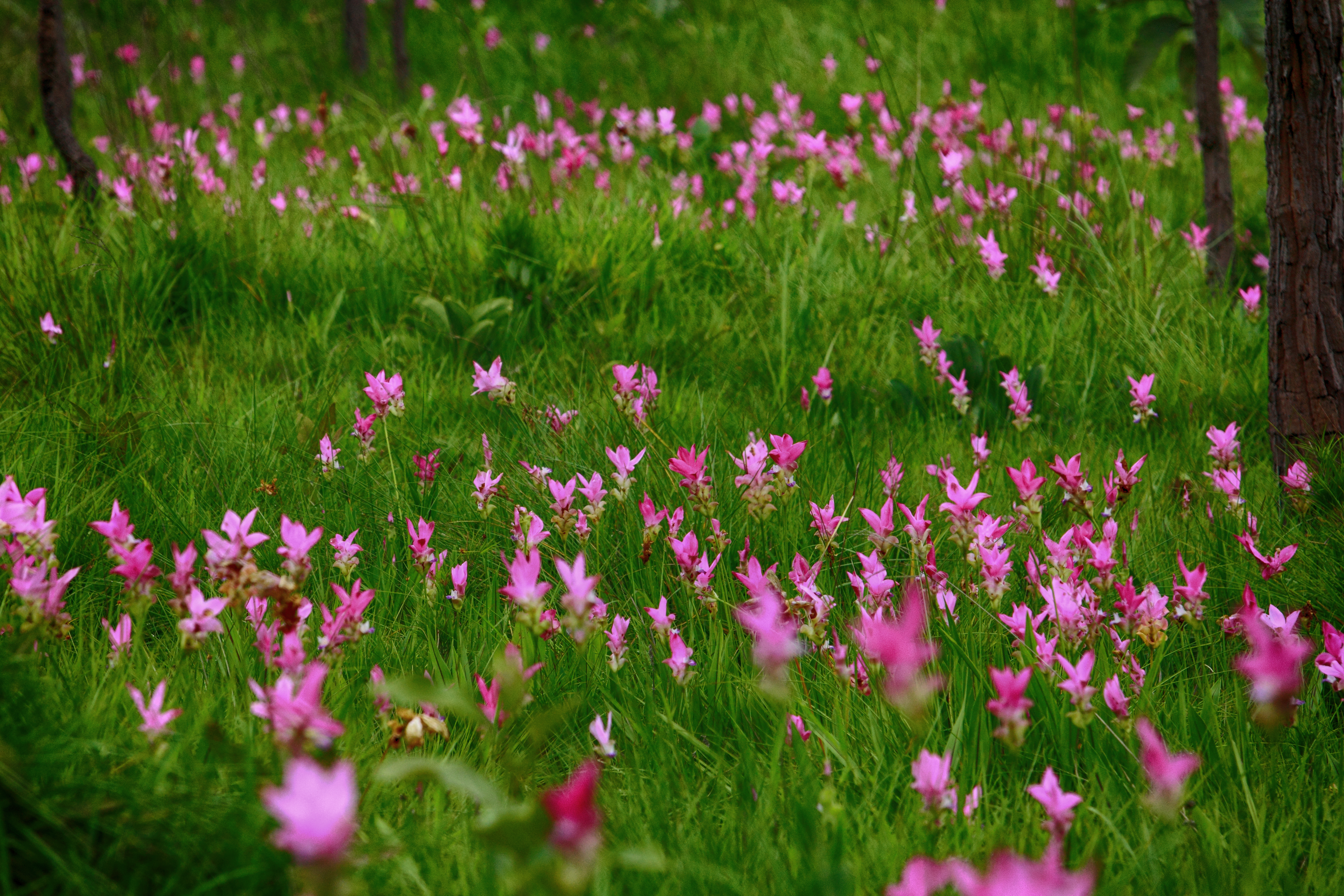
A field of wild Siam tulips in Pa Hin Ngam National Park, Thailand

Curcuma alismatifolia, Siam tulip or summer tulip (Thai: ปทุมมา, RTGS: pathumma; กระเจียวบัว, RTGS: krachiao bua; ขมิ้นโคก, RTGS: khamin khok) is a tropical plant native to Laos, northern Thailand, and Cambodia. Despite its name, it is not related to the tulip, but is a close relative of turmeric. It can grow as an indoor plant. It is a perennial herb growing up to 2 feet (0.61 metres) tall.

Malvidin 3-rutinoside is a pigment responsible for bract color in C. alismatifolia.
