= Nong Bua Daeng district =

Nong Bua Daeng หนองบัวแดง
- District
- District location in Chaiyaphum province
- Coordinates: 16°4′54″N 101°48′12″E
- Country: Thailand
- Province: Chaiyaphum
- Seat: Nong Bua Daeng

Area
  - Total: 2,215.5 km^{2} (855.4 sq mi)

Population (2000)
  - Total: 92,766
  - Density: 41.9/km^{2} (109/sq mi)
- Time zone: UTC+7 (ICT)
- Postal code: 36210
- Geocode: 3605

Nong Bua Daeng (Thai: หนองบัวแดง, pronounced [nɔ̌ːŋ būa dɛ̄ːŋ]; Northeastern Thai: หนองบัวแดง, pronounced [nɔ̌ːŋ bùa dɛ̀ːŋ]) is a district (amphoe) of Chaiyaphum province, northeastern Thailand.

== History ==
The district was established as a minor district (king amphoe) on 16 July 1965, when the two tambons Nong Bua Daeng and Nang Daet were split off from Kaset Sombun District. It was upgraded to a full district on 1 April 1969.

== Geography ==
Neighbouring districts are (from the north clockwise): Khon San district, Kaset Sombun, Mueang Chaiyaphum, Ban Khwao, Nong Bua Rawe, and Phakdi Chumphon of Chaiyaphum Province; and Nong Phai and Mueang Phetchabun of Phetchabun province.

== Administration ==
The district is divided into eight subdistricts (tambons), which are further subdivided into 130 villages (mubans). There is one municipality (thesaban), and eight tambon administrative organizations (TAO).

1.	Nong Bua Daeng	หนองบัวแดง
2.	Kut Chum Saeng	กุดชุมแสง
3.	Tham Wua Daeng	ถ้ำวัวแดง
4.	Nang Daet	นางแดด
7.	Nong Waeng	หนองแวง
8.	Khu Mueang	คูเมือง
9.	Tha Yai	ท่าใหญ่
11.	Wang Chomphu	วังชมภู

Missing numbers are now tambons of Phakdi Chumphon District.
