= Bangkok–Nong Khai high-speed railway =

Thai train service

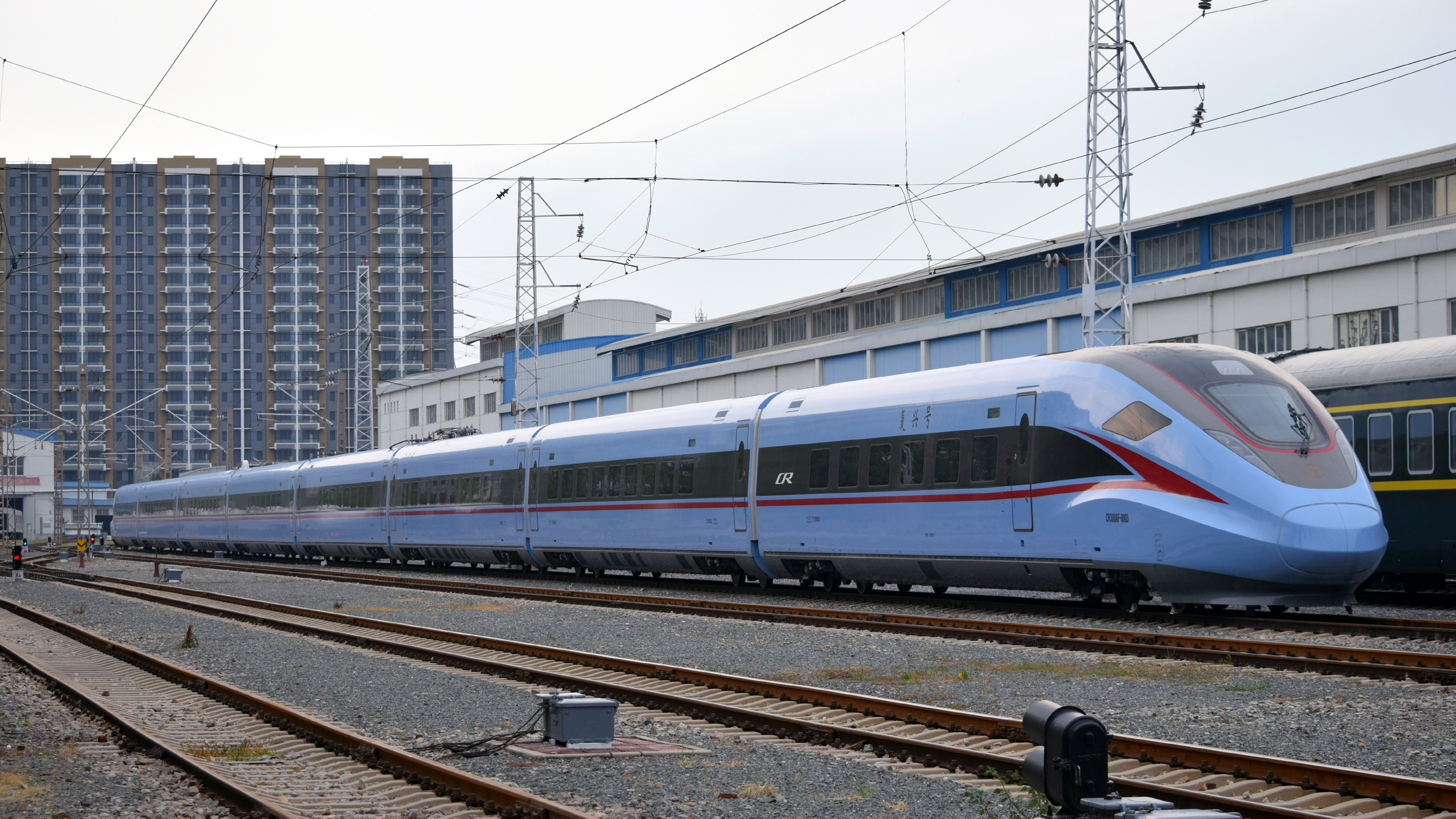
- CRRC Fuxing Series EMU proposed for Northeastern high-speed rail line passenger services.

Overview
- Other name(s): Northeastern high-speed rail line China–Thailand railway
- Status: Under construction (Bangkok–Nakhon Ratchasima)
- Locale: Thailand
- Termini: Krung Thep Aphiwat; Nakhon Ratchasima (Phase 1) Nong Khai (Phase 2) Vientiane (Phase 3)
- Continues from: Boten–Vientiane railway (planned)

Service
- Type: High-speed rail
- Operator: State Railway of Thailand
- Depot: Chiang Rak Noi

History
- Work began: 21 December 2017(Phase 1) est. 2026 (Phase 2)
- Planned opening: 2031 (Phase 1)

Technical
- Line length: Phase 1: 253 km (157 mi); Phase 2: 356 km (221 mi); Phase 3: 16 km (9.9 mi)
- Num of tracks: 2
- Track gauge: 1,435 mm (4 ft 8 1/2 in) standard gauge
- Operating speed: 250 km/h (160 mph)

The Bangkok–Nong Khai high-speed railway or Northeastern high-speed rail line is a high-speed railway under construction in Thailand. It will be the first high-speed line in Thailand, and is planned to be constructed in multiple phases.

Construction began on the 253 kilometres (157 mi) first phase between Bangkok and Nakhon Ratchasima in 2017, but has progressed to only 52.4% completion as of March 2026 due to multiple delays. Operations on the line are expected to commence in 2030. The total cost of the first phase is estimated at 179 billion Thai baht.

The second phase, from Nakhon Ratchasima to Nong Khai, was approved by the Thai Cabinet in February 2025. It will span 357 kilometres (222 mi) and cost approximately 341 billion baht, with operations expected to commence in 2031.

The third phase, from Nong Khai to Vientiane, has not been confirmed. There is however an existing single 1,000 mm railway connection in the central reservation of the First Thai–Lao Friendship Bridge.

The railway is envisioned to serve as a major connection along the Kunming–Singapore railway central line.

== History ==
Route map

High-speed rail in Thailand was first planned by the Thai parliament in 2010 with a proposal of five routes radiating from Bangkok.

In March 2013, then-transport minister revealed that only one company would be selected to run all high-speed train routes, scheduled to be operational between 2018 and 2019. The first 86 km (53 mi) section from Krung Thep Aphiwat Central Terminal to Ayutthaya was planned to be tendered in late-2013; however following the 2014 Thai coup d'état, plans were deferred.

In November 2014, Thailand and China signed a memorandum of understanding agreeing to create a joint committee construct the Thai portion of the transnational railway running from Kunming, China, to the Gulf of Thailand. In November 2015, both parties agreed to divide the project into four phases. Under the framework, a joint venture will be set up to run the project. China will conduct feasibility studies, design the system, construct tunnels and bridges, and lay track. Thailand will conduct social and environmental impact studies, expropriate land for construction, handle general civil engineering and power supply, and supply construction materials. In 2016, the formal agreement on construction was signed by the Chinese and Thailand governments.

China will operate and maintain the system for the first three years of operation. Both countries will share responsibility from the third to seventh years. Afterward, Thailand will have sole responsibility, and China will advise. China will provide training for operations and maintenance. Despite China offering financial packages for its infrastructure deal, Thailand chose to pay the whole project cost, ensuring the independent ownership of the railway.

Dual standard-gauge tracks will be laid in the project. In Thailand, two routes will diverge at a junction in Kaeng Khoi District in Saraburi Province. One will connect Bangkok to Kaeng Khoi. The other route will connect Kaeng Khoi with Map Ta Phut Industrial Estate of Rayong Province. From Kaeng Khoi, tracks will lead north to Nakhon Ratchasima and on to Nong Khai Province. The Bangkok to Nong Khai HSR line will connect to the 617 km (383 mi) Boten–Vientiane railway from Vientiane to the northern Lao border and the 414 km (257 mi) line from the Lao border to Kunming.

In July 2021, authorities said that "works which will have to be postponed are the [... tracks] between Nawa Nakhon and Ban Pho, between Phra Kaeo and Saraburi"; furthermore another postponement, "presumably until [... 2022 is] the section between Don Mueang and Nawa Nakhon".

As of Q4 2022, the "first phase between Bangkok and Nakhon Ratchasima is [...] behind schedule"; furthermore, it's "15% completed when it should have been 37%"; the Phase 1 line was The phase one was originally set to be completed by 2026, but was delayed to 2027. The primary reason was contributed to the COVID-19 pandemic. The initial phase between Nakhon Ratchasima and Bangkok was estimated to cost 5.1 billion US dollars.

During its routine cabinet meeting on 4 February 2025, the Cabinet of Thailand sanctioned the second phase of the China–Thailand Railway Cooperation Project, specifically the Korat-Nong Khai segment of the Bangkok–Nong Khai high-speed train connection. The project is slated to commence in 2025 and is anticipated to conclude in 2030.

== Rolling stock ==
Northeastern High Speed Railway will use Fuxing Hao CR300AF High-speed rail EMU, produced by CRRC. The CR300AF models has a maximum speed of 300 km/h (Operating speed in Thailand will be 250 km/h).

== Construction ==
Construction is divided into sections: Bangkok–Kaeng Khoi, Kaeng Khoi–Nakhon Ratchasima, Nakhon Ratchasima–Nong Khai. Construction of Thailand's 873 km (542 mi) portion of the railway system started in December 2017 and is expected to take three years for phase 1 to Nakhon Ratchasima. The first contract consisted of a 3.5 km section from Klong Dan to Pang Asok with a budget of 371 million baht after a nine percent decrease from the initial budget.

In February 2018, the Thai transport minister stated that the contract for the first phase, the 250.8 km Bangkok to Nakhon Ratchasima section, would be issued by May 2018. The second contract will cover the 11 km section from Sikhio to Kut Chik. The first phase of the line to Nakhon Ratchasima has been divided into 14 contracts, with contracts 3–7 to be auctioned by June 2018, while contracts 8–14 would be auctioned before the end of 2018. Later, however, there were disputes between China, Thailand and Laos over the financing of the project. Thailand decided to finance its part of the route itself, although only the high-speed route Bangkok – Nakhon Ratchasima is to be built for the time being. After several postponements, the Bangkok (Krung Thep Aphiwat Central Terminal) to Nakhon Ratchasima high-speed rail project (Phase 1) was officially launched by the Thai government in October 2020. However, the Nakhon Ratchasima to Nong Khai section (Phase 2) was confirmed in February 2025 and the Nong Khai to Vientiane section (Phase 3) has not yet been confirmed.

=== Sikhio Crane collapse ===
On 14 January 2026, a crane working on the high-speed rail project collapsed and hit a passenger train, killing at least 32 people on board.

=== Construction contracts and progress ===
| Contracts | Details | Type | Distance (kilometers) | Budget (million baht) | Contractor | Progress (November 2024) | Progress (November 2025) | Progress (November 2026) |
|---|---|---|---|---|---|---|---|---|
| 4-1 | Krung Thep Aphiwat Central Terminal–Don Mueang International Airport | Elevated | 11.83 | - | Asia Era One Co., Ltd. (included in construction contract of 3 Airports project) | 0% | 0% | 0% |
| 4-2 | Don Mueang International Airport–Nawa Nakhon | Elevated | 21.80 | 8,626 | Sino-hydro Co., Ltd. Sahakan Wisawakorn Co., Ltd. Tipakorn Co., Ltd. | 1.45% | 8.12% | 13.28% |
| 4-3 | Nawa Nakhon–Ban Pho | Elevated | 23 | 11,525 | China State Construction Engineering Corporation Co., Ltd. Nawarat Patanakarn PLC. A.S. Associate Engineering (1964) Co., Ltd. | 44.59% | 62.18% | 68.87% |
| 4-4 | Chiang Rak Noi depot | Ground level | - | 6,500 | Italian Thai Development | 26.36% | 52.26% | 60.25% |
| 4-5 | Ban Pho–Phra Kaeo, including Ayutthaya station | Ground level and elevated | 13.30 | 9,913 | . | 0% | 0% | 0% |
| 4-6 | Phra Kaeo–Saraburi | Ground level and elevated | 31.6 | 9,429 | Unique Engineering and Construction PLC. | 8.57% | 16.26% | 32.23% |
| 4-7 | Saraburi–Kaeng Khoi, including Saraburi and Kaeng Khoi station | Ground level and elevated | 12.99 | 8,560 | Civil Engineering PCL | 60.50% | 68.79% | 73.75% |
| 3-1 | Kaeng Khoi–Klang Dong and Pang Asok–Bandai Ma | Ground level and elevated | 30.21 | 9,330 | Italian Thai PLC-CREC. | 2.81% | 24.35% | 44.92% |
| 1-1 | Klang Dong–Pang Asok | Ground level | 3.5 | 425 | Department of Highways | 100% completed | 100% completed | 100% completed |
| 3-2 | Muak Lek–Lam Takhong | Tunnel | 12.23 | 4,200 | Nawarat Patanakarn PCL | 81.41% | 99.60% | 99.99% |
| 3-3 | Bandai Ma–Lam Takhong, including Pak Chong station | Elevated | 26.10 | 9,838 | Thai Engineer and Industry Co., Ltd. | 55.35% | 59.41% | 60.05% |
| 3-4 | Lam Takhong–Sikhio, and Kut Chik–Khok Kruat | Ground level and elevated | 37.45 | 7,790 | Italian-Thai Development | 82.55% | 99.45% | 99.99% |
| 2-1 | Sikhio–Kut Chik | Ground level | 11 | 3,115 | Civil Engineering PCL | 100% completed | 100% completed | 100% completed |
| 3-5 | Khok Kruat–Nakhon Ratchasima | Ground level and elevated | 12.38 | 7,700 | SPTK Joint Venture | 11.92% | 16.27% | 18.12% |

== Route ==
| Station | Distance from Bangkok (km) | Distance from the last station (km) |
Phase 1
| Krung Thep Aphiwat | 0 | 0 |
| Don Mueang | 13.8 | 13.8 |
| Ayutthaya | 67.4 | 53.6 |
| Saraburi | 109.5 | 42.1 |
| Pak Chong | 173.3 | 63.8 |
| Nakhon Ratchasima | 250.5 | 77.2 |
Phase 2
| Bua Yai | | |
| Ban Phai | | |
| Khon Kaen | | |
| Udon Thani | | |
| Nong Khai | | |
Phase 3
| Vientiane | | |

A map depicting the planned high speed rail lines of Thailand as of 2022.

Phase 1: Bangkok (Krung Thep Aphiwat) – Don Mueang – Ayutthaya – Saraburi – Pak Chong – Nakhon Ratchasima

Phase 2: Nakhon Ratchasima – Bua Yai – Ban Phai – Khon Kaen – Udon Thani – Nong Khai

Phase 3: Nong Khai – Vientiane (including a new Mekong bridge which is 50 meters from the current one)

Key stations on the Bangkok – Nong Khai high-speed railway
