= Khlong Muak Lek =

River in Thailand

Coordinates: 14°33′N 101°12′E

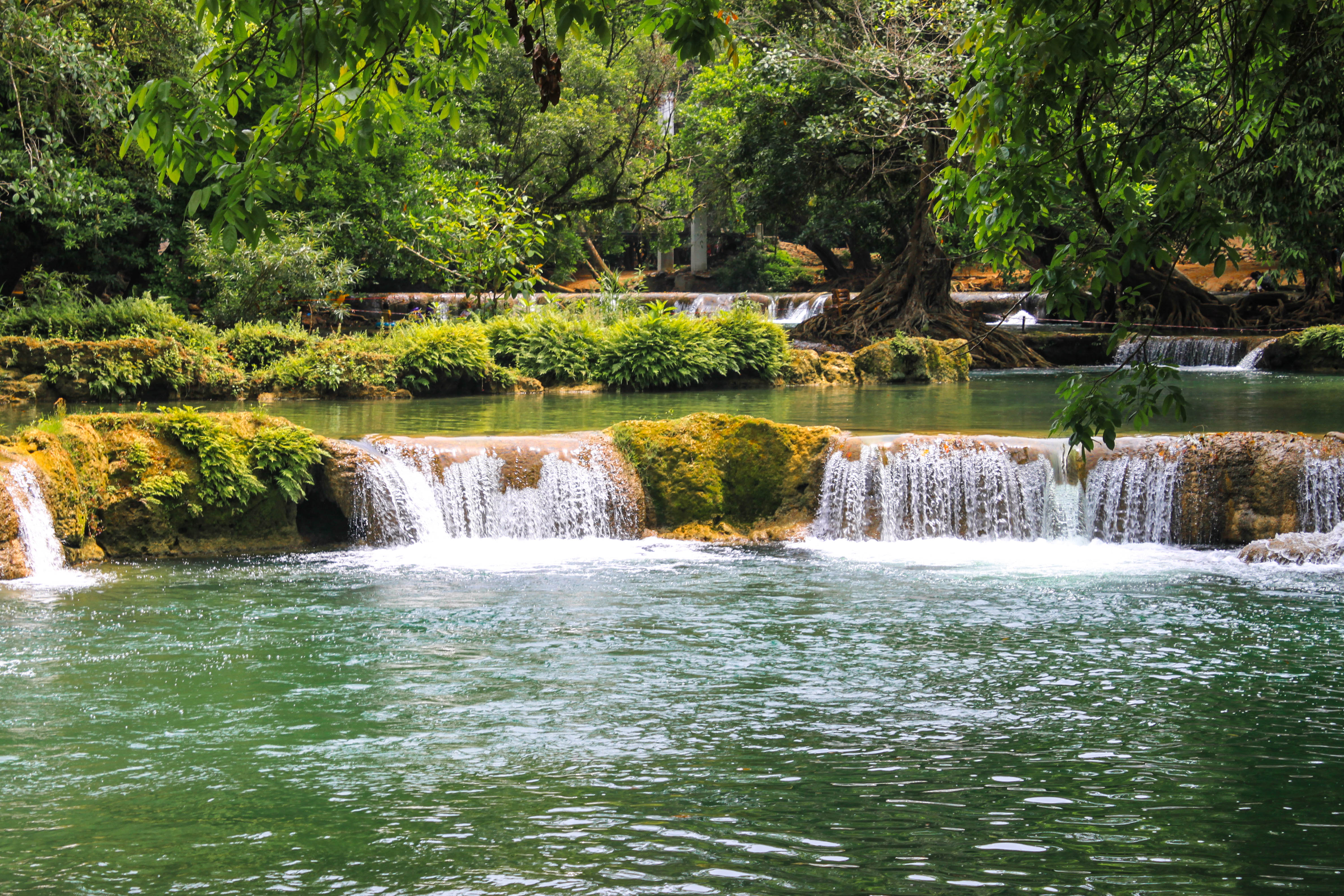
The Chet Sao Noi Waterfalls

Khlong Muak Lek (Thai: คลองมวกเหล็ก, pronounced [kʰlɔ̄ːŋ mûa̯k lèk]) or Huai Muak Lek (ห้วยมวกเหล็ก, [hûa̯j–]) is a watercourse of Thailand. It is a tributary of the Pa Sak River, part of the Chao Phraya River basin.

Despite its name (khlong usually meaning 'canal'), Khlong Muak Lek is a natural river. It originates from Khao Inthani in the Dong Phaya Yen Mountains, in the area of Khao Yai National Park, and flows northwards, forming the boundary between Muak Lek District of Saraburi Province and Pak Chong District of Nakhon Ratchasima, before entering Muak Lek, turning west, and ultimately joining the Pa Sak in Kham Phran Subdistrict of Wang Muang District, just downstream from Pa Sak Jolasid Dam. Its total length is 71 kilometres (44 mi).

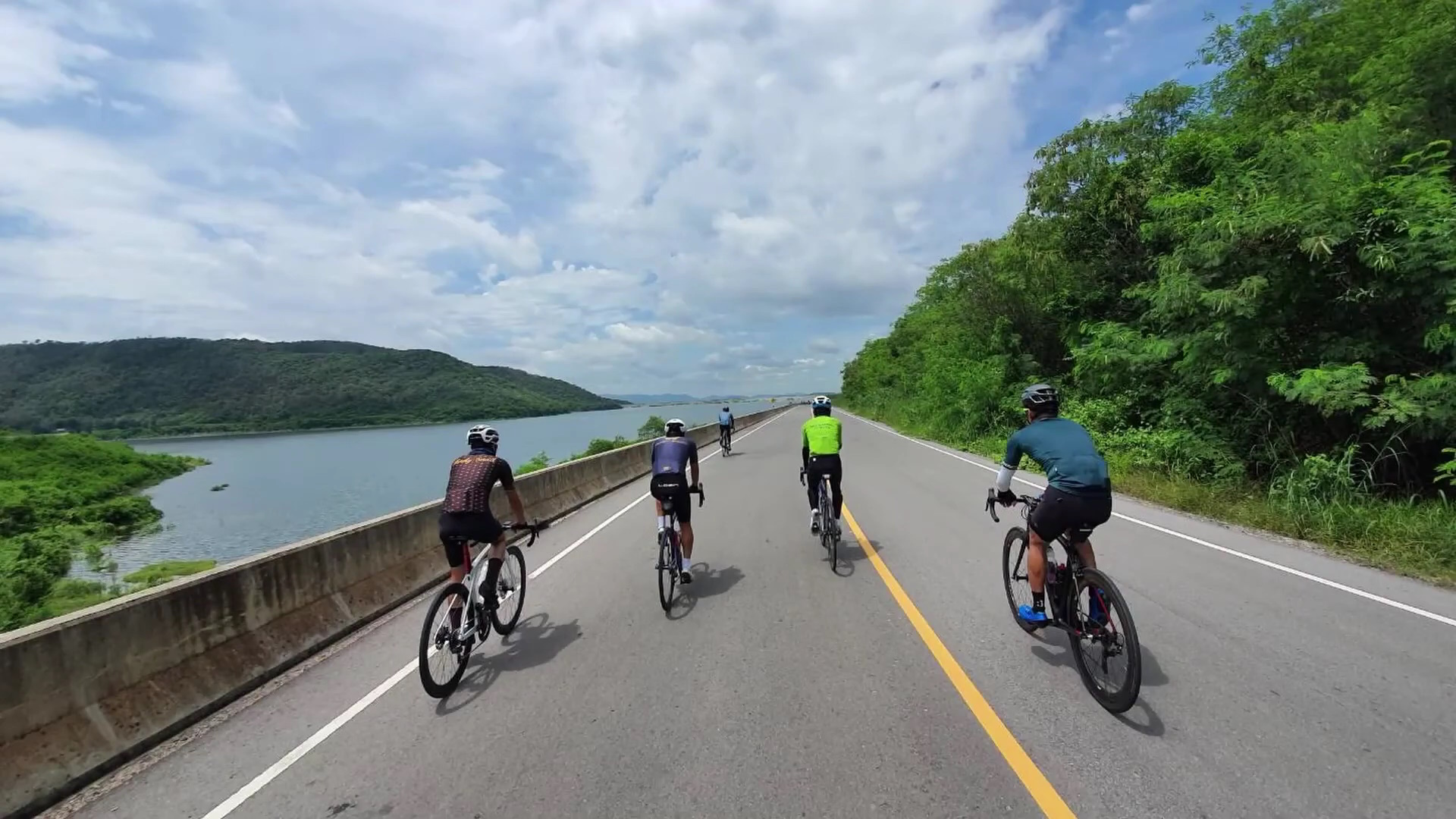
The Muak Lek Reservoir serves as a destination for cycling and other excursions.

The river has several rapids and small waterfalls, which serve as tourist attractions, most significantly the Chet Sao Noi Waterfalls in Namtok Chet Sao Noi National Park, which covers forested hills flanking the river. A dam, built from 2012 to 2020, forms the Muak Lek Reservoir, which irrigates the Wang Muang District area.
