= Chaiyaphum (disambiguation) =

Chaiyaphum can refer to these places in Thailand:

- the town Chaiyaphum
- Chaiyaphum Province
- Mueang Chaiyaphum district
