= Pak Chong district =

Pak Chong ปากช่อง
- District
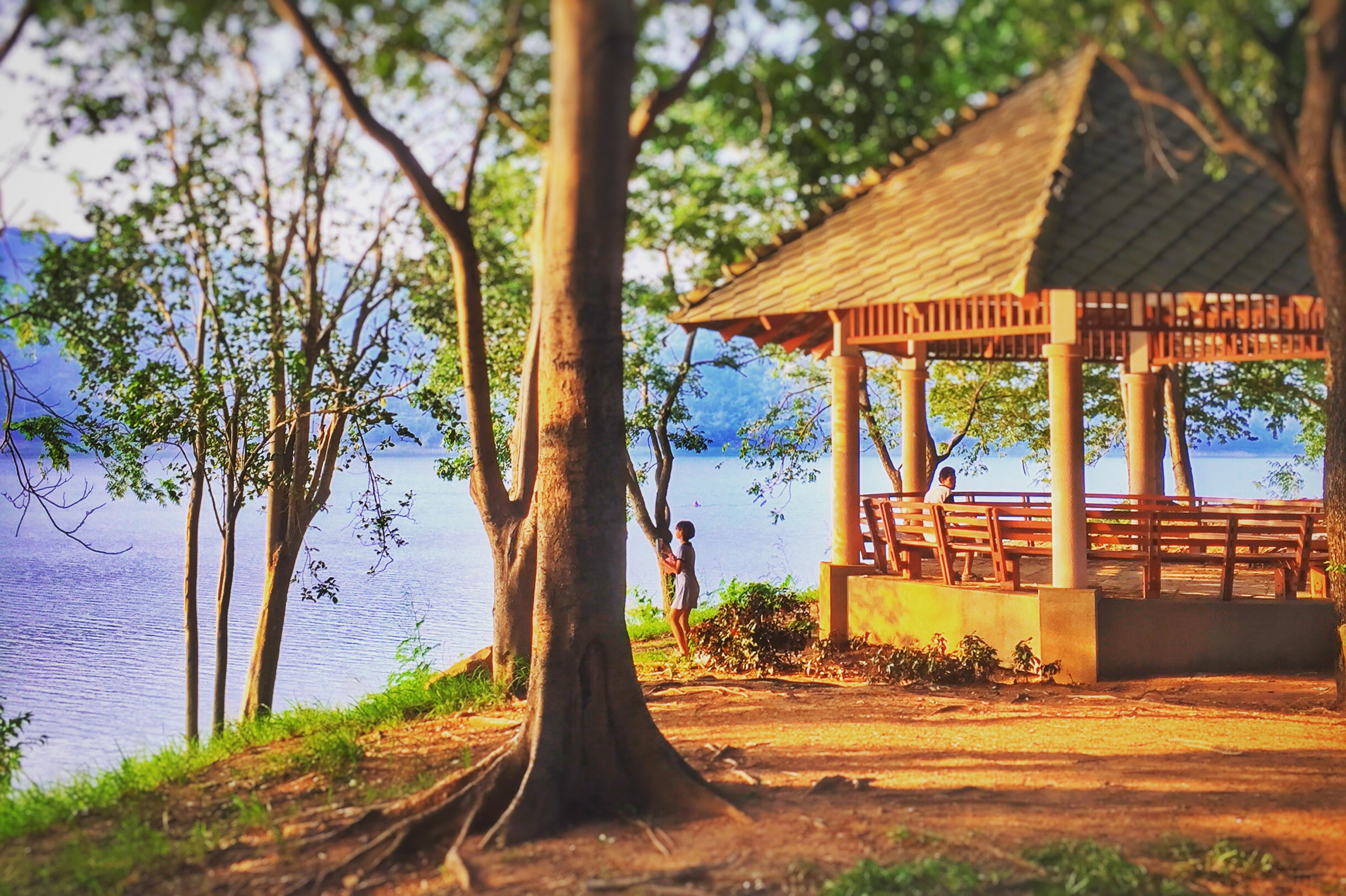
- Lam Takhong Reservoir

- District location in Nakhon Ratchasima province
- Coordinates: 14°42′45″N 101°25′19″E
- Country: Thailand
- Province: Nakhon Ratchasima
- Seat: Pak Chong

Area
  - Total: 1,825.2 km^{2} (704.7 sq mi)

Population (2015)
  - Total: 193,197
  - Density: 100/km^{2} (260/sq mi)
- Time zone: UTC+7 (ICT)
- Postal code: 30130, 30320
- Geocode: 3021

Pak Chong (Thai: ปากช่อง, pronounced [pàːk tɕʰɔ̂ŋ]; Northeastern Thai: ปากช่อง, pronounced [pàːk sɔ̄ŋ]) is the westernmost district (amphoe) of Nakhon Ratchasima province, northeastern Thailand, and the main point of entry into Isan as the main road and rail lines cross the Dong Phaya Yen Mountains into the region. It is a popular tourist destination, especially among weekenders from Bangkok, and is home to many resorts and touristy attractions, in addition to the main entrance into Khao Yai National Park.

== History ==
Up until the mid-19th century, the area of Pak Chong district and Muak Lek to its west was covered by a thick jungle known as Dong Phaya Fai (later to become known as Dong Phaya Yen), through which passed an important though harshly inhospitable route through the mountains that provided access into the Khorat Plateau from the town of Sara Buri. The population centre of Pak Chong was originally a small village on the eastern fringe of the jungle, which, according to writings of Prince Damrong Rajanubhab, was the farthest point carts from Khorat could travel before needing to continue on foot through the rugged hills. When the Northeastern Railway was built through the area in 1898 during the reign of King Chulalongkorn (Rama V), a cutting was made through the hills at the village, leading it to become known as Ban Pak Chong, meaning 'village at the mouth of the cutting'.

At the time, the village was part of Tambon Khanong Phra of Amphoe Chan Thuek, which became renamed as Tambon Chanthuek of Amphoe Sikhio in 1939. In 1949, Ban Pak Chong was upgraded to subdistrict (tambon) status. It was upgraded to a minor district (king amphoe) effective 1 January 1957, consisting of the four subdistricts Pak Chong, Chanthuek, Klong Dan, and Mu Si. It was upgraded to a full district in July 1958.

The forests of Dong Phaya Yen were rapidly cleared following the construction of Mittraphap Road in 1955, which vastly opened up access to the area. Most of the land became dedicated to agriculture, particularly plantations of maize and cassava, following government incentives. Only scattered forested hills remain, leading up to Khao Yai National Park on the district's southern edge, which was established as the country's first national park in 1962. Proximity to the national park would later contribute to the district's development as a tourist destination, especially in the 2000s to 2010s.

The local government of Pak Chong town was first established as a sanitary district (sukhaphiban) in 1956. It was established as a subdistrict municipality (thesaban tambon) in 1981 and became a town municipality (thesaban mueang) in 2005.

== Geography ==
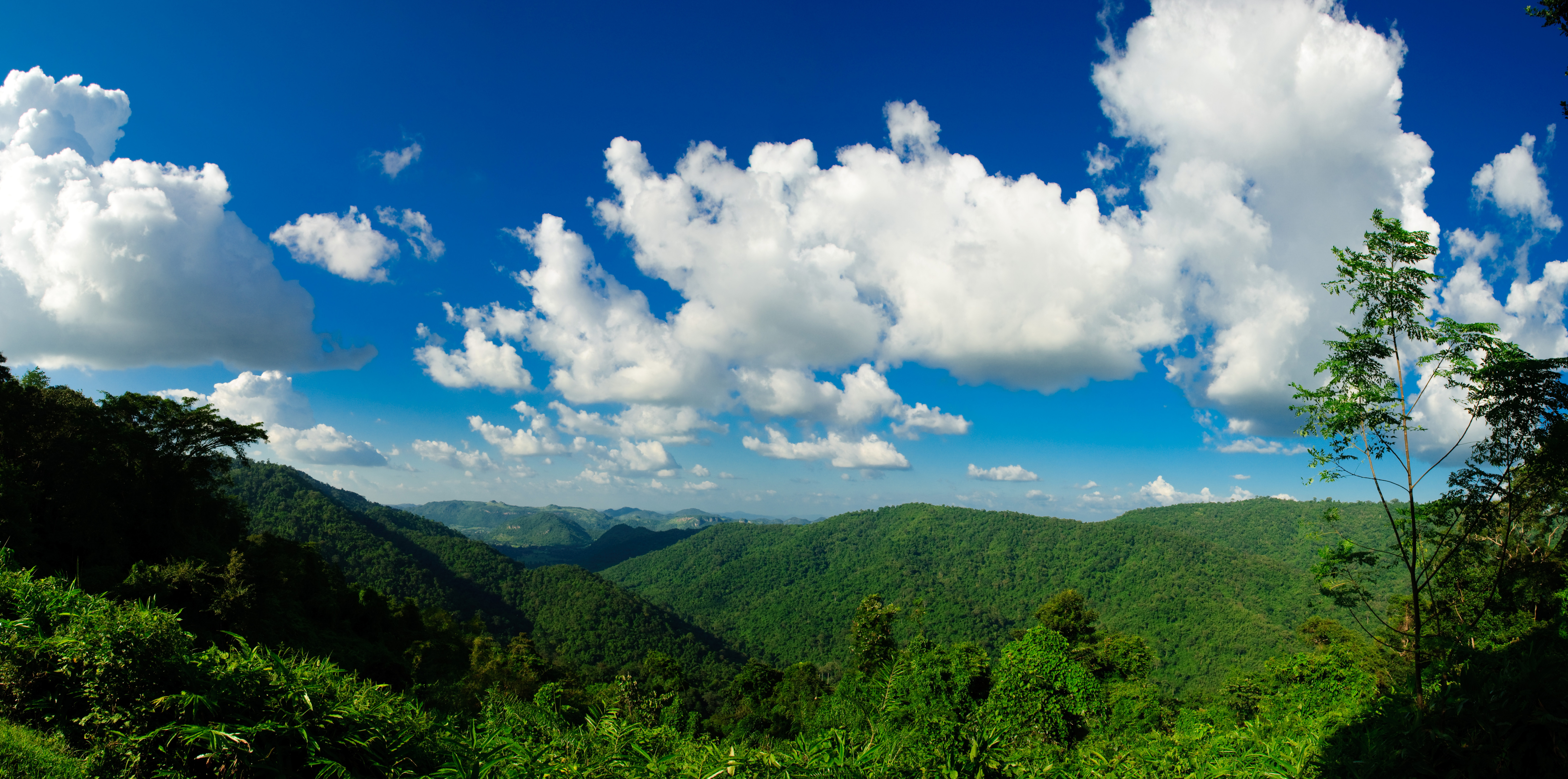
Khao Yai National Park

Pak Chong is the biggest district of Nakhon Ratchasima by area, at 1,825.17 square kilometres (704.70 sq mi). It is bordered by Nakhon Ratchasima's districts of Sikhio to the northeast and Sung Noen, Pak Thong Chai and Wang Nam Khiao to the east, Prachantakham district of Prachin Buri province and Pak Phli and Mueang Nakhon Nayok districts of Nakhon Nayok province to the south, and Muak Lek of Saraburi province to the west and northwest.

The district lies within the hills of the Dong Phaya Yen Mountains, which form the southwestern boundary of the Isan region (northeastern Thailand). The district is limited in the east by the Khorat Cuesta, which forms a ridge marking the edge of the Khorat Plateau, while the ridge of the Sankamphaeng Mountains, covered by Khao Yai National Park, forms its southern border. The stream Khlong Muak Lek, flowing northwards from the mountains, marks its western boundary. The Lam Takhong, also originating in Khao Yai, flows northwards through the district, passing through Pak Chong town and emptying into the Lam Takhong Dam reservoir in the district's northeast.

Pak Chong district is the main entry point into Isan from the central region, as the primary routes of both road and rail traverse the district from west to northeast through the Dong Phaya Yen pass. Pak Chong town lies slightly north of the district's physical centre, while its southern area, abutting Khao Yai National Park and generally also known as Khao Yai, has developed into a spread-out resort area. The town of Klang Dong—meaning 'middle of the jungle'—lies southwest of Pak Chong town along the road and railway, to the district's west.

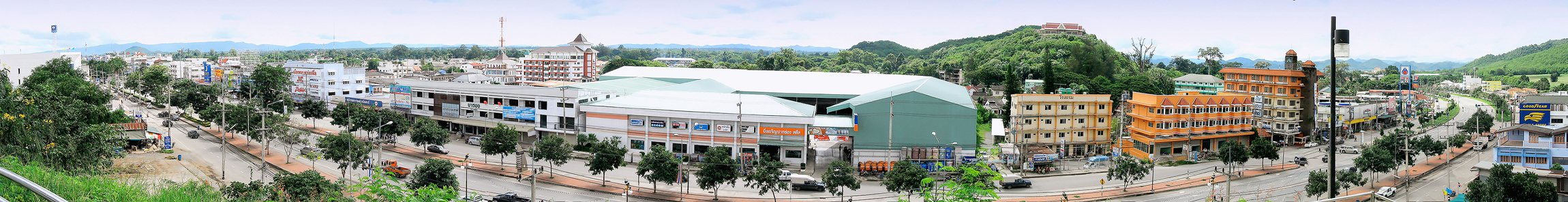
Pak Chong and Old Hwy 2 (note the new road is the bypass to the south). View from Khao Noy Park

== Climate ==
Climate data for Pak Chong, elevation 386 m (1,266 ft), (1993–2022)
Month	Jan	Feb	Mar	Apr	May	Jun	Jul	Aug	Sep	Oct	Nov	Dec	Year
Mean daily maximum °C (°F)	29.9 (85.8)	32.0 (89.6)	33.5 (92.3)	33.7 (92.7)	32.7 (90.9)	32.2 (90.0)	31.2 (88.2)	30.7 (87.3)	30.3 (86.5)	30.0 (86.0)	29.8 (85.6)	28.9 (84.0)	31.2 (88.2)
Daily mean °C (°F)	23.6 (74.5)	25.3 (77.5)	27.0 (80.6)	27.5 (81.5)	27.5 (81.5)	27.5 (81.5)	26.9 (80.4)	26.5 (79.7)	25.7 (78.3)	25.3 (77.5)	24.7 (76.5)	23.2 (73.8)	25.9 (78.6)
Mean daily minimum °C (°F)	18.0 (64.4)	19.6 (67.3)	21.5 (70.7)	22.8 (73.0)	23.7 (74.7)	24.0 (75.2)	23.8 (74.8)	23.4 (74.1)	22.7 (72.9)	22.0 (71.6)	20.7 (69.3)	18.5 (65.3)	21.7 (71.1)
Average precipitation mm (inches)	16.6 (0.65)	29.7 (1.17)	71.2 (2.80)	115.2 (4.54)	169.8 (6.69)	95.2 (3.75)	109.6 (4.31)	141.8 (5.58)	252.2 (9.93)	142.8 (5.62)	29.8 (1.17)	14.8 (0.58)	1,188.7 (46.79)
Average precipitation days	2.5	3.9	8.0	12.2	15.7	14.2	16.0	17.3	20.1	13.4	5.0	1.5	129.8
Average relative humidity (%)	64	64	68	72	76	75	76	79	84	82	73	67	73
Source: Soil Resources Survey and Research Division

== Economy ==
The majority of the population of Pak Chong district as well as Pak Chong town are employed in agriculture, with maize being the main produce, followed by cassava. Cattle rearing forms an important industry in the district, which is one of the country's top dairy producers, along with neighbouring Muak Lek. Several factories in diverse industries including sack-weaving, electronics, rock-crushing and livestock feed production serve as a major source of employment.

Tourism is also a large contributor to the economy, with tourists coming to visit Khao Yai National Park as well as other attractions in the wider Khao Yai area to the south of the district. Agritourism draws visitors to major farms and vineyards, Khao Yai being one of Thailand's two wine-producing regions along with Hua Hin. Numerous resorts, golf clubs, cafés, art galleries and shopping centres are scattered throughout the area, many of which feature novelty European-themed architectural styles and cater to domestic tourists, mainly the Bangkok middle-class. Development of holiday properties is a major driver of real estate development in the Khao Yai area.

The Royal Thai Army's special combat training camp is in Nong Taku, Khanong Phra subdistrict. It trains five classes of 300 soldiers each per year in the 56-day training course.

== Transport ==
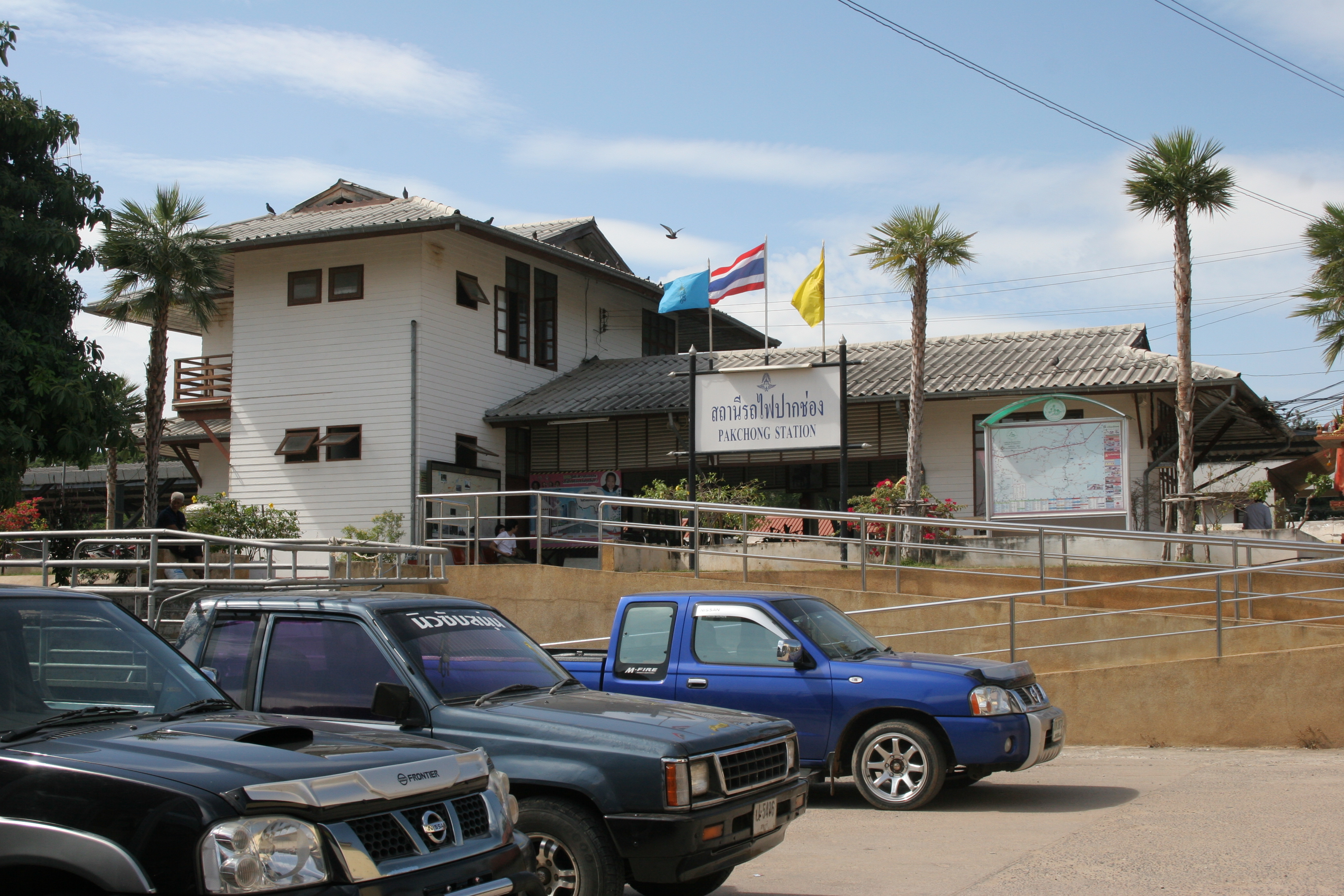
Pak Chong railway station

Mittraphap Road, designated National Highway 2, is the primary highway that carries traffic between Bangkok and the entire Isan region. It links Pak Chong westward to Muak Lek and northeastward to Sikhio. While the original route passed through the town of Pak Chong and continues to serve as its main thoroughfare, the main highway now bypasses the town to the south. The under-construction Motorway 6, which is scheduled to open in 2022, will feature an access ramp for Pak Chong and Khao Yai on Thanarat Road (Highway 2090), the main access road linking the town to the national park's main northern entrance.

The State Railway of Thailand's Northeastern Line passes through the district with stations at Klang Dong, Pang Asok, Bandai Ma, Pak Chong, Sap Muang, Chanthuek and Khlong Khanan Chit, Pak Chong railway station being the only class 1 station. As of 2022, the railway is being upgraded to double-track, along with construction of the Bangkok–Nong Khai high-speed railway, which will have a station at Pak Chong.

Some long-distance trains from Bangkok to Udon Thani or Nong Khai and all trains to Ubon Ratchathani stop at Pak Chong, as well as the local trains connecting Kaeng Khoi Junction with Nakhon Ratchasima railway station and beyond.

== Administration ==
=== Central administration ===
Pak Chong is divided into 12 sub-districts (tambons), which are further subdivided into 219 administrative villages (mubans).

No.	Name	Thai	Villages	Pop.
1.	Pak Chong	ปากช่อง	22	44,059
2.	Klang Dong	กลางดง	15	13,034
3.	Chanthuek	จันทึก	22	17,246
4.	Wang Katha	วังกะทะ	24	9,580
5.	Mu Si	หมูสี	19	12,759
6.	Nong Sarai	หนองสาหร่าย	25	39,074
7.	Khanong Phra	ขนงพระ	15	12,537
8.	Pong Talong	โป่งตาลอง	13	5,217
9.	Khlong Muang	คลองม่วง	21	10,379
10.	Nong Nam Daeng	หนองน้ำแดง	11	10,010
11.	Wang Sai	วังไทร	18	11,435
12.	Phaya Yen	พญาเย็น	14	7,867

=== Local administration ===
There is one town (thesaban mueang) in the district:

- Pak Chong (Thai: เทศบาลเมืองปากช่อง) consisting of parts of the sub-districts Pak Chong and Nong Sarai.

There are four sub-district municipalities (thesaban tambons) in the district:

- Klang Dong (Thai: เทศบาลตำบลกลางดง) consisting of parts of sub-districts Klang Dong and Phaya Yen.
- Wang Sai (Thai: เทศบาลตำบลวังไทร) consisting of sub-district Wang Sai.
- Mu Si (Thai: เทศบาลตำบลหมูสี) consisting of sub-district Mu Si.
- Sima Mongkhon (Thai: เทศบาลตำบลสีมามงคล) consisting of parts of sub-district Klang Dong.

There are nine sub-district administrative organizations (SAO) in the district:

- Pak Chong (Thai: องค์การบริหารส่วนตำบลปากช่อง) consisting of parts of sub-district Pak Chong.
- Chanthuek (Thai: องค์การบริหารส่วนตำบลจันทึก) consisting of sub-district Chanthuek.
- Wang Katha (Thai: องค์การบริหารส่วนตำบลวังกะทะ) consisting of sub-district Wang Katha.
- Nong Sarai (Thai: องค์การบริหารส่วนตำบลหนองสาหร่าย) consisting of parts of sub-district Nong Sarai.
- Khanong Phra (Thai: องค์การบริหารส่วนตำบลขนงพระ) consisting of sub-district Khanong Phra.
- Pong Talong (Thai: องค์การบริหารส่วนตำบลโป่งตาลอง) consisting of sub-district Pong Talong.
- Khlong Muang (Thai: องค์การบริหารส่วนตำบลคลองม่วง) consisting of sub-district Khlong Muang.
- Nong Nam Daeng (Thai: องค์การบริหารส่วนตำบลหนองน้ำแดง) consisting of sub-district Nong Nam Daeng.
- Phaya Yen (Thai: องค์การบริหารส่วนตำบลพญาเย็น) consisting of parts of sub-district Phaya Yen.
