= Namtok Chet Sao Noi National Park =

- อุทยานแห่งชาติน้ำตกเจ็ดสาวน้อย
- IUCN category II (national park)
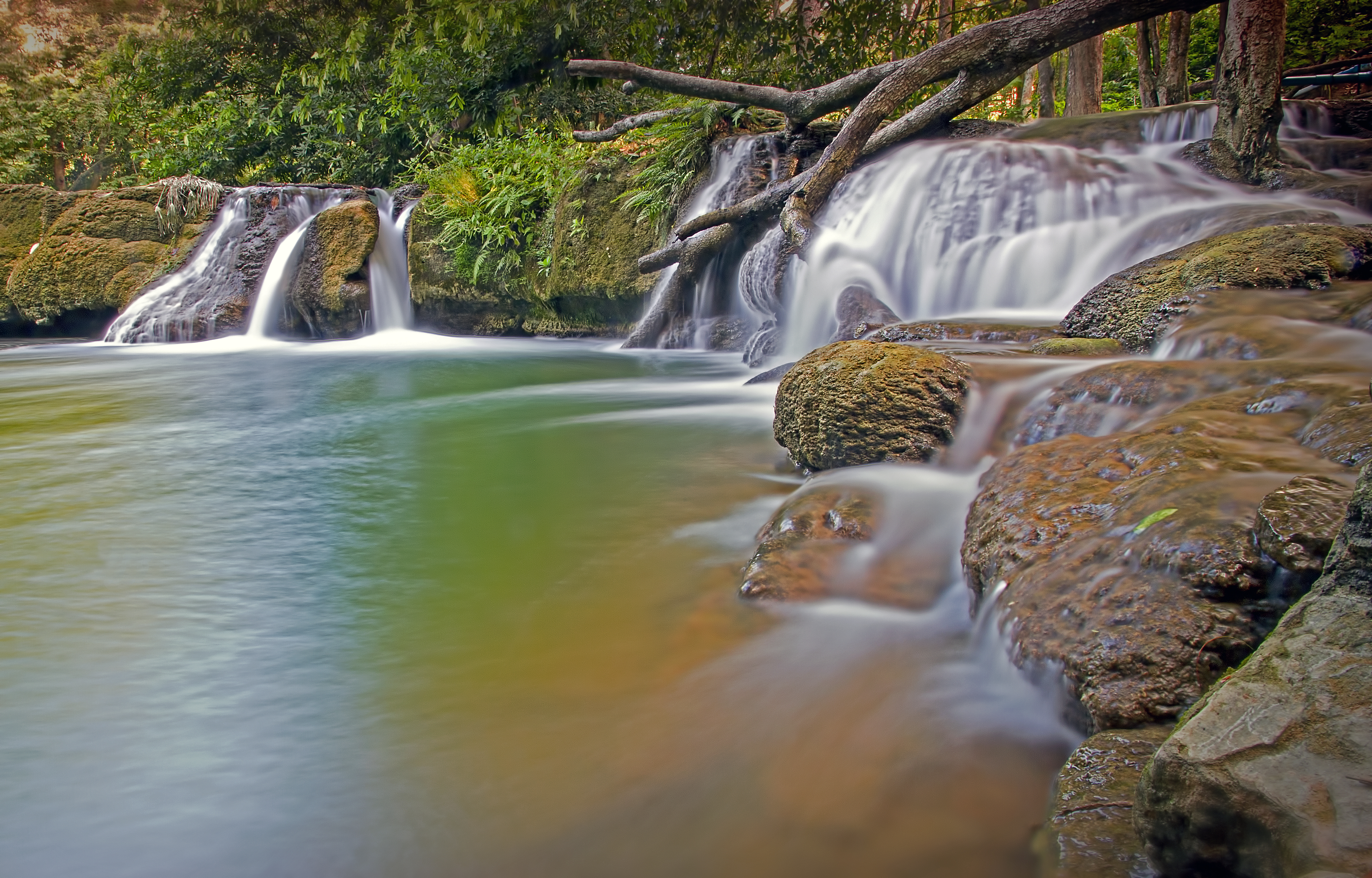
- Chet Sao Noi waterfall

- Location within Thailand
- Location: Saraburi and Nakhon Ratchasima provinces, Thailand
- Nearest city: Pak Chong
- Coordinates: 14°43′34″N 101°11′21″E
- Area: 42 km^{2} (16 sq mi)
- Established: 26 December 2016
- Visitors: 389,101 (in 2019)
- Governing body: Department of National Parks, Wildlife and Plant Conservation

Namtok Chet Sao Noi National Park (Thai: อุทยานแห่งชาติน้ำตกเจ็ดสาวน้อย) is a national park in Thailand, with a total area of 26,238 rai ~ 42 square kilometres (16 sq mi) covering Muak Lek district, Wang Muang district, Saraburi province and Pak Chong district, Nakhon Ratchasima province.

== Geography and history ==
Namtok Chet Sao Noi or Chet Sao Noi waterfall (lit. 'seven little girls waterfall') is a small waterfall. The waterfall flows along a stream and has seven tiers (hence the name seven little girls), but there are many different stories about the waterfall names. The height of each tier is approx four m (13 ft), with spacious, shaded swimming areas available underneath.

It has been upgraded from the forest park to be the 129th national park of Thailand on 26 December 2016 and is the first site in the King Rama X's reign.

== Sights ==
- Namtok Chet Sao Noi
- Muak Lek Creek
- Tree Tunnel The tree tunnel on the bend of Highway 2089 (Muak Lek–Wang Muang) making it over 200 m (656 ft) long.

== Flora and fauna ==
Namtok Chet Sao Noi is covered in tropical rain forest, including such species as Pterocarpus macrocarpus, Sterculia foetida, Bombax ceiba, Garuga pinnata, Senna garrettiana, Senna garrettiana, Ficus carica, Holarrhena pubescens and Fernandoa adenophylla.

Animal species include serow, jackal, marten, small civet, porcupine, palm civet, hare, ground squirrel, striped squirrel, flying squirrel, mongoose, pangolin, black baza, palm swift, shrike, snail-eating turtle, house gecko, monitor lizard, water monitor, python, birdwing.

== Location ==
Namtok Chet Sao Noi National Park in overview PARO 1 (Saraburi branch)

1) Namtok Chet Sao Noi National Park in overview PARO 1 (Saraburi branch)

	National park
1	Namtok Chet Sao Noi
2	Namtok Sam Lan
	Wildlife sanctuary
3	Sap Langka

	Non-hunting area
4	Kaeng Khoi
5	Khao Erawan
6	Khao Somphot
7	Khao Wong Chan Daeng
8	Khuean Pasak Jolasid
9	Wat Phai Lom–Wat Amphu Wararam
10	Wat Tan En

	Botanical garden
11	Phu Kae

== See also ==
- List of national parks of Thailand
- List of Protected Areas Regional Offices of Thailand
