= Dhamayatra of Lumpatao River Basin =

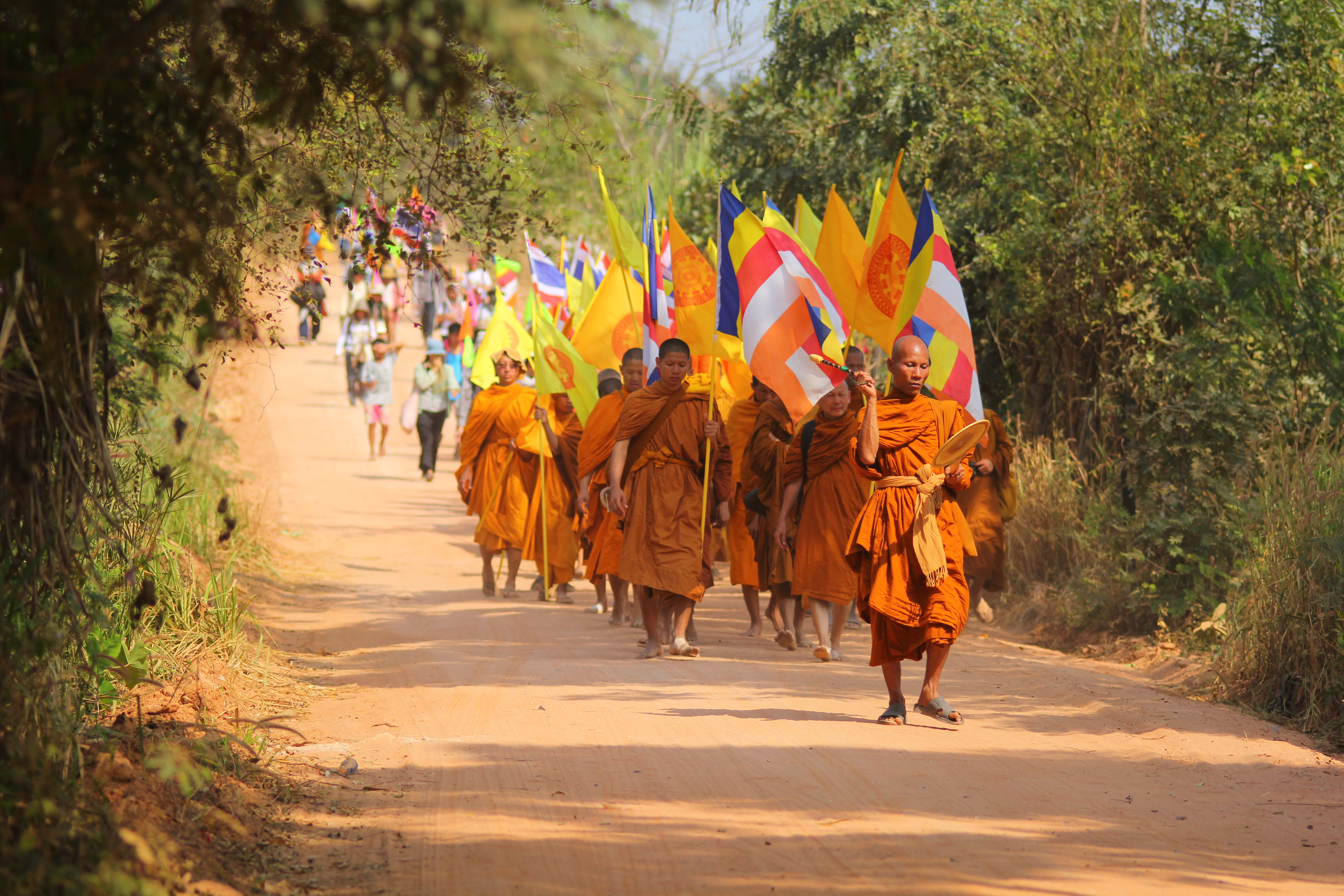
Dhamayatra group walking through the forest of Lumpatao River Basin, Chaiyaphum, Thailand

Dhamayatra (Thai: ธรรมยาตรา) is a name of an activity in which a group of people created a long distance walking campaign to peacefully represent the importance of some problems in society. Dhamayatra have been used many times, especially in south east Asia, including Thailand. One of the most famous Dhamayatra in Thailand is “Dhamayatra of Lumpatao River Basin” (Thai: ธรรมยาตราลุ่มน้ำลำปะทาว) which is a 7-day event held every year in Chaiyaphum province. “Dhamayatra of Lumpatao River Basin” has been held 16 times with the purpose of creating awareness of environmental problems in Thailand.

== History ==
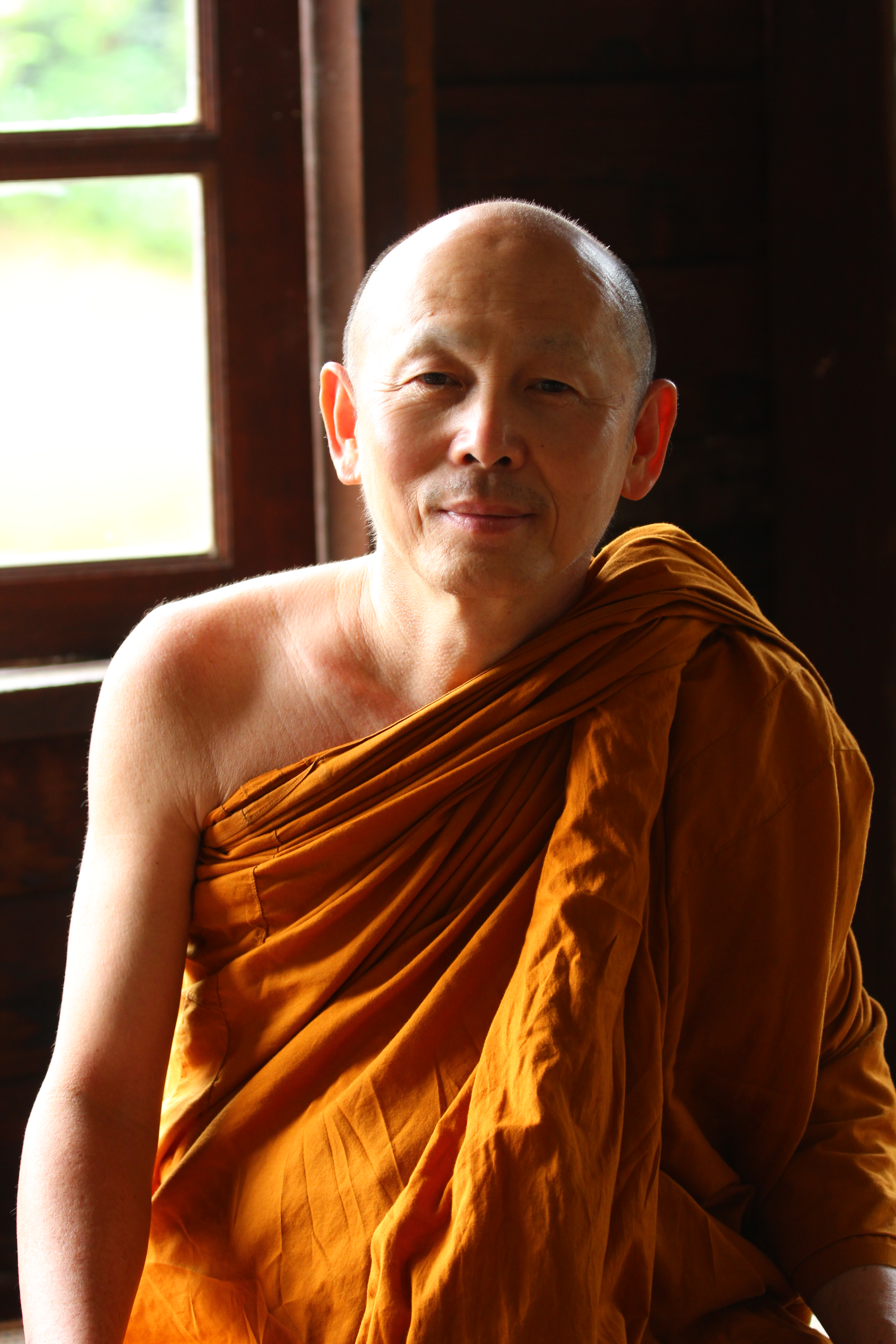
Pra Paisan Visalo, one of the Dhamayatra of Lampatao River Basin founder

=== Lampatao Environment Issue ===
A long time ago, Lampatao river basin had an abundance of nature. But after the Industrial Revolution came to Thailand in the 1880s, the government changed the country’s direction. They started a forest concession and created the Lumpatao Dam, which involved destroying a lot of forest in the process. They also encouraged farmers to do monoculture farming which uses a lot of chemical compounds. As the time past, the Lampatao River basin lost a lot of forest, many local animals and plant went extinct, and local people also faced many natural disasters.

=== Starting the Campaign ===
Luang Pho Kam Khean and Phra Paisal Visalo of Wat Pa Sukato in Lampatao River Basin observe that the environment in this area is a critical issue. They started the Dhamayatra in the year 2000[1] in order to generate an awareness of this environmental issue. The main target was the local villagers.

== Daily life and activities ==
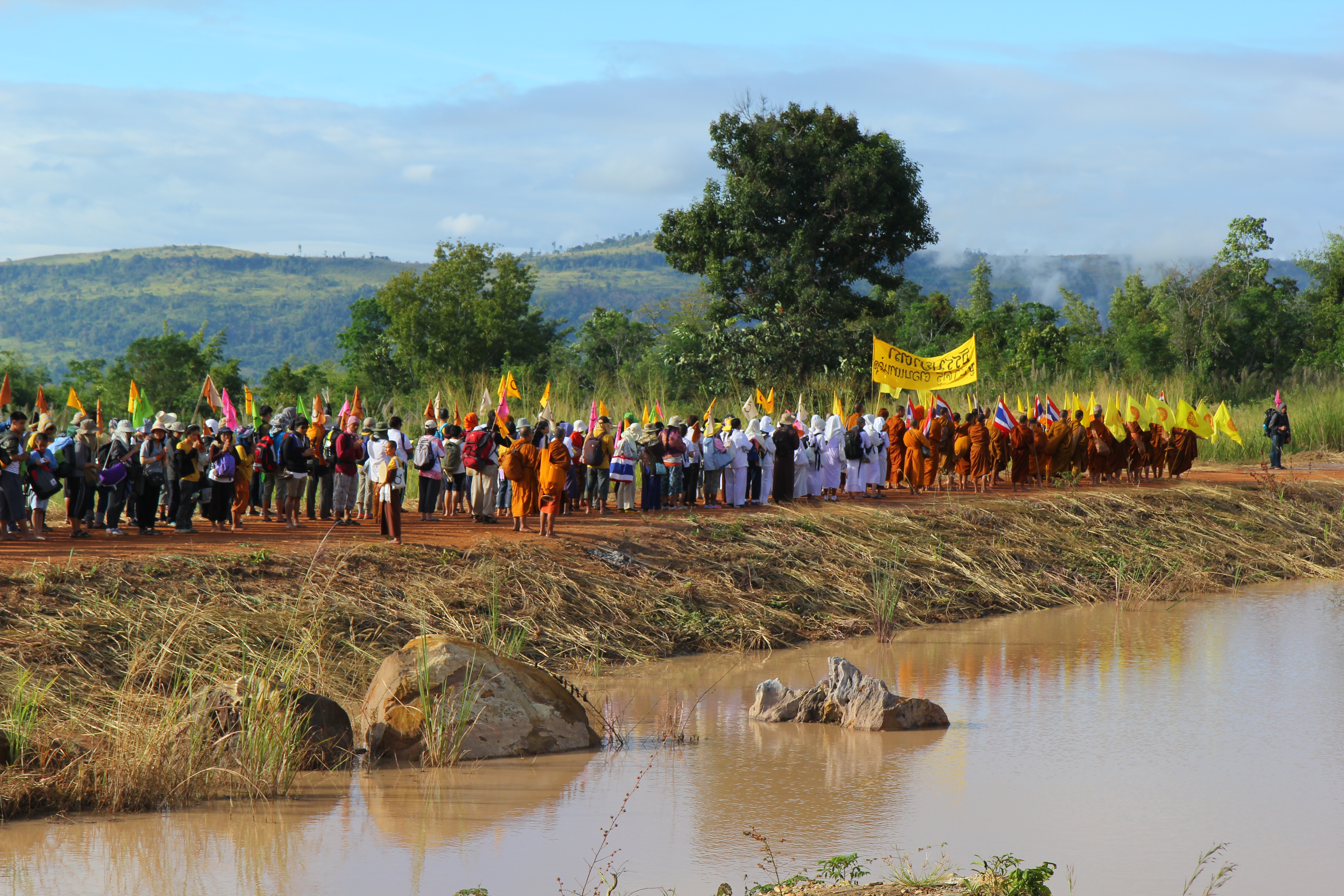
Group of Dhamayatra of Lampatao River Basin preparing the caravan

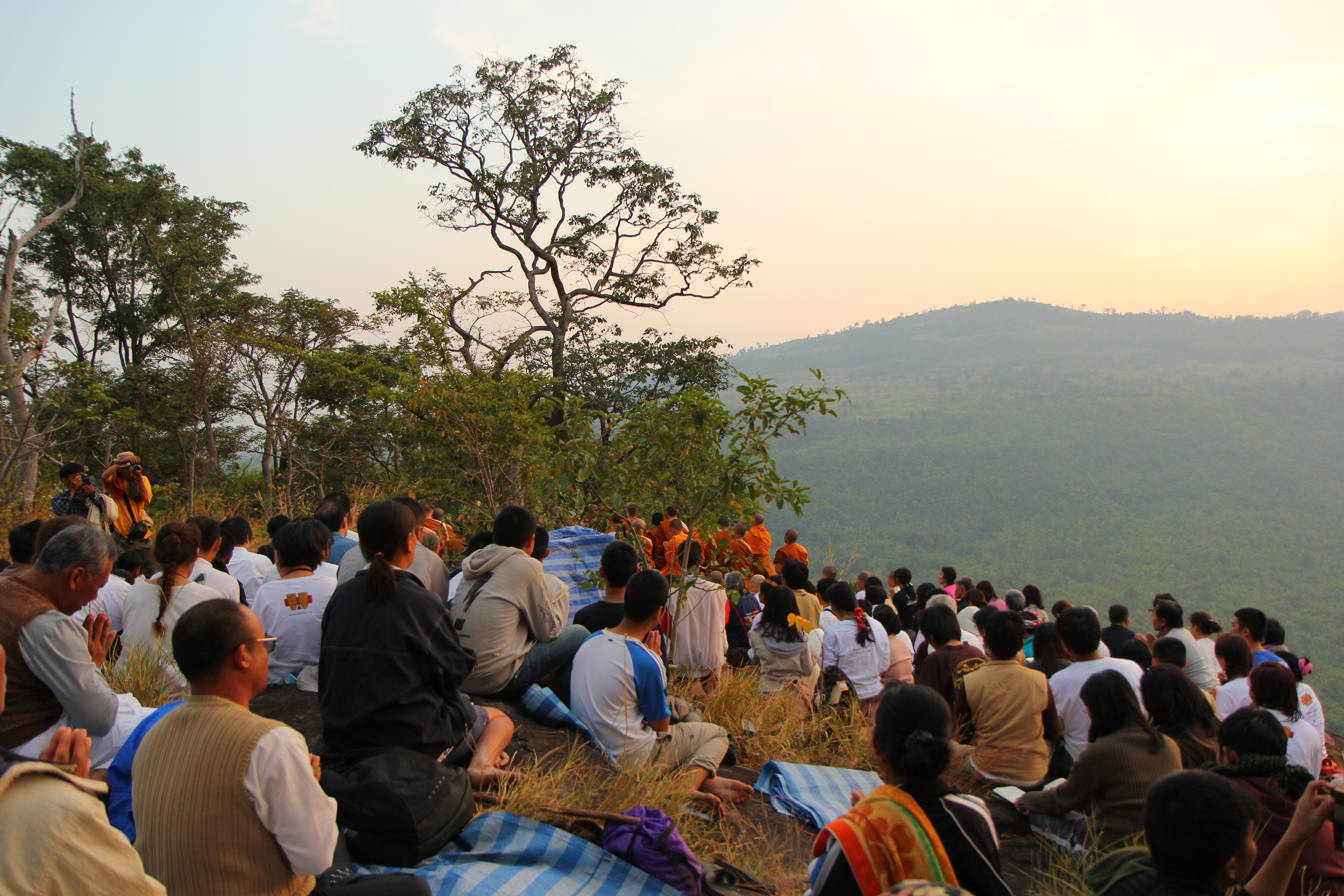
Dhamayatra group meditating on the mountain during the sunset

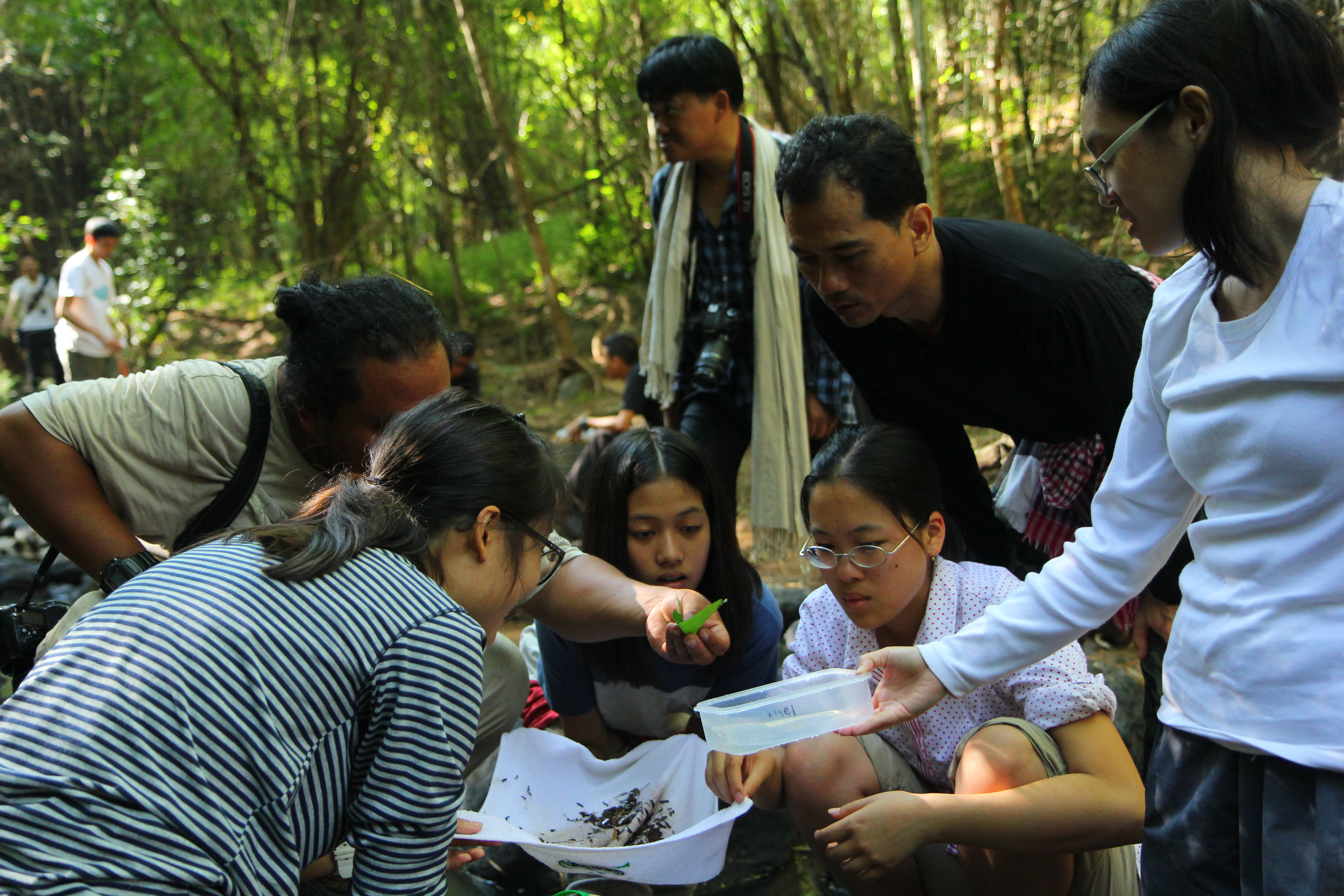
Water checking activities in Dhamayatra of Lampata River Basin

=== People ===
A core team consists of monks from Wat Pa Sukato who are led by Luang Pho Kam Khean and Pra Paisan Visalo and the group also includes people from the province. Moreover, each year other interested people participate in the events, including villagers, student activists, and NGO workers.

=== Route ===
The walking path is changed every year, but it always is approximately 100 km in length, which is split into seven days. Participants start by walking only a short distance in the very first day and then increase the distance slightly with each successive day. Each day is split into morning and afternoon trips, with a lunch break in between. And there are some short breaks during each period. They walk past a variety of atmospheres. The participants walk across the mountain, the forest and the city by the lead of monks. They continue the walk, regardless of the weather.

=== Living ===
The waking goal in each day is to arrive at the next milestone in order to rest at night, which is almost always a temple. Because in Thailand, a Buddhist country, many temples are spread all around the country, so it is a very good place for the group to get rest. The meals, including breakfast and lunch, come from food that villagers have given to the temple. They don’t take dinner due to the monks' dietary rules. But some days, the group also need to rest in a forest. On those days, meals need to be pre-prepared.

=== Meditating ===
Because Dhamayatra uses the thought of Dhamma, the participants also meditate. Praying and meditating are done both in the morning and in the evening. They also pray for the nature before starting the walk each day.

=== Activities ===
This campaign also has activities for people in the group which can be separated according to two purposes. The first are science-based activities which give knowledge. They have water checking activities to show the problems of low-quality water in the area they walk past, blood tests to show how many chemical compounds are in their bodies, and an organic fertilizer making activity to teach villagers an alternative to using chemical fertilizers. The second are social-based activities which help the people in the group to know each other better, such as games and the exchanging of knowledge and experience.
