= Khao Yai (disambiguation) =

Khao Yai, meaning 'large mountain' in Thai, usually refers to an area in the Sankamphaeng mountain range of Thailand which is now Khao Yai National Park.

Khao Yai may also refer to:

- Khao Yai area, the resort area adjoining the national park in Pak Chong District, Nakhon Ratchasima Province
- Khao Yai District, a former name of Pak Phli District, Nakhon Nayok Province
- Khao Yai Subdistrict in Ao Luek District, Krabi Province
- Khao Yai Subdistrict in Cha-am District, Phetchaburi Province
- Khao Yai is a name shared by several mountains in the Tenasserim Hills
  - Khao Yai, Ratchaburi, a-1,050-m high mountain in Ratchaburi Province
  - Khao Yai, Sangkhla Buri, an 805-m-high mountain in Sangkhla Buri District, Kanchanaburi Province
  - Khao Yai, Thong Pha Phum, a 1,025-m-high mountain in Thong Pha Phum District, Kanchanaburi Province
  - Khao Yai, Thap Sakae, a 919-m-high mountain in Thap Sakae District, Prachuap Khiri Khan Province
