= Chaiyabhumbhakdeechumphon School =

- โรงเรียนชัยภูมิภักดีชุมพล

Location
- 19 Bannakarn Rd. Muangchaiyaphum District Chaiyaphum Province; Chaiyaphum, 36000; Thailand
- Coordinates: 15.805800°N 102.032797°E

Information
- Type: Government
- Motto: natthī panya sama ābha
- Established: 25 December 1899
- Founder: Provost Charun Nirotkit
- School board: The Secondary Service Area Office 30
- Authority: Office of the Basic Education Commission Ministry of Education (Thailand)
- Director: Sarawut Singharatho
- Teaching staff: 192
- Grades: 7–12 (mathayom 1–6)
- Gender: Coeducational
- Enrolment: 3096 (2009 academic year)
- Classes: 79
- Average class size: 49
- Colours: Yellow and red
- Song: Chaiyabhumbhakdeechumphon March (Thai: มาร์ชชัยภูมิภักดีชุมพล)
- Revenue: 93,567,200 Baht (2,672,777.14 USD) (Year 2013)
- Website: http://www.cb.ac.th

Chaiyabhumbhakdeechumphon School (Thai: โรงเรียนชัยภูมิภักดีชุมพล) is a provincial secondary school of Chaiyaphum in north-east Thailand. It was established in 1899 (Rattanakosin Sok 118) during the reign of King Chulalongkorn.

== Directors ==
No	Name	Term start/Term end
1	Phra Kru Charun Nirotkit	A.D. 1899–1891
2	Phra A-chan Koet	A.D. 1891–1892
3	Phra A-chan Pleng	A.D. 1907–1912
4	Phra A-chan Pom	A.D. 1912–1914
5	Phromma Siriphromma	A.D. 1914–1920
6	Nu (Manu) Nakhamadi	A.D 1920–1933
7	Kulap Praphatnobhon	A.D. 1933–1935
8	Thong Phong-Anan	A.D. 1935–1945
9	Chalo Prathummanon	A.D. 1947–1947
10	Chalerm Chiranat	A.D. 1947–1951
11	Laue Khamwachiraphithak	A.D. 1951–1969
12	Chup Wongnara	A.D. 1969–1974
13	Manot Panto	A.D. 1974–1976
14	Dilok Watchanasunthon	A.D. 1974–1978
15	Suang Yuwakan	A.D. 1978– 1982
16	Samli Phadungsi	A.D. 1982–1986
17	Thong-In Pheaphukheo	A.D. 1986–1997
18	Khanit Phiromkraiphak	A.D. 1997–1998
19	Amphan Rakmani	A.D. 1998–2000
20	Wongchai Chanachai	A.D. 2000–2010
21	Phisit Suepnukanwattana	A.D. 2010–2012
22	Surawit Phonmani	A.D. 2012–2015
23	Sarawut Singharatho	A.D. 2015–present
