= Muak Lek district =

Muak Lek มวกเหล็ก
- District
- District location in Saraburi province
- Coordinates: 14°39′20″N 101°11′54″E
- Country: Thailand
- Province: Saraburi
- Seat: Muak Lek

Area
  - Total: 681.4 km^{2} (263.1 sq mi)

Population (2005)
  - Total: 49,572
  - Density: 72.75/km^{2} (188.4/sq mi)
- Time zone: UTC+7 (ICT)
- Postal code: 18180
- Geocode: 1911

Muak Lek (Thai: มวกเหล็ก, pronounced [mûak lèk]) is a district (amphoe) of Saraburi province, Thailand. It occupies the province's easternmost part, in the Dong Phaya Yen Mountains which divide the central and northeastern regions. Originally a formidable jungle, much of the forest cover was cleared in the 20th century, though several forested hills remain, with natural features serving as tourist destinations—parts of Khao Yai and Namtok Chet Sao Noi national parks are within the district area. Dairy farming is an important industry in the district, having been introduced to the country here in 1962.

== History ==
Up through the 19th century, the area of Muak Lek district, together with Pak Chong district to its east, was covered by the thick jungle of Dong Phaya Fai (later renamed Dong Phaya Yen), through which passed an important though harshly inhospitable route through the mountains into the Khorat Plateau from Saraburi. The Northeastern Railway was built through the pass in 1898, with a station at Muak Lek town. Conditions during the construction were harsh, with many workers perishing to disease. Knud Lyne Rahbek (1878–1897), a Danish assistant railway surveyor and the son of chief engineer Knud Rahbek, died here and is buried in a prominent grave near the station.

The forests of Dong Phaya Yen were rapidly cleared following the construction of Mittraphap Road in 1955, which vastly opened up access to the area. When the Thai government pushed for the development of a dairy industry with Danish assistance in 1960s, Muak Lek was chosen as the site of the Thai–Danish Dairy Farm and its training centre, which opened in 1962.

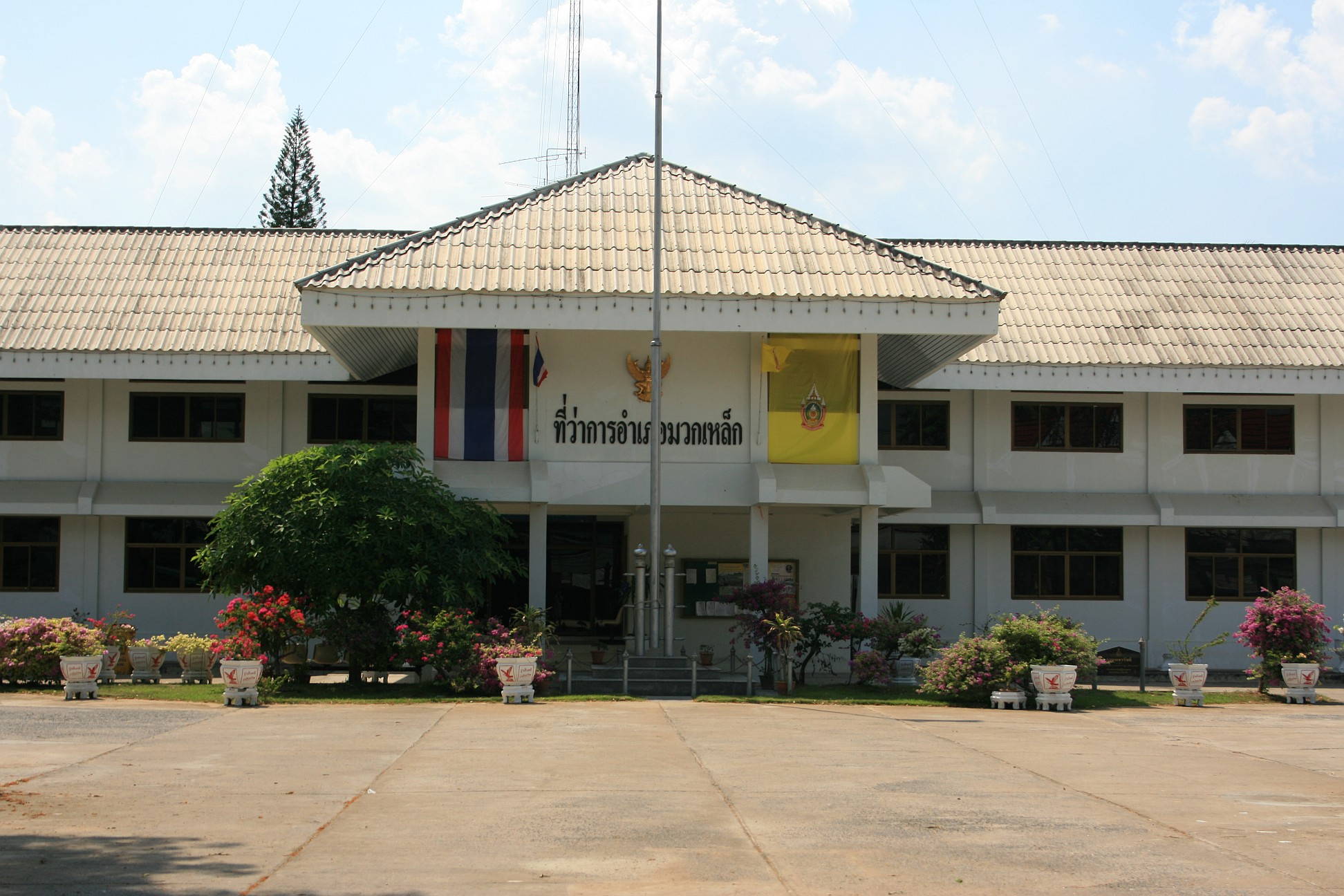
District office

Muak Lek district used to be a subdistrict (tambon) under Saraburi province's Kaeng Khoi district. It was created as a district on 27 December 1968, when the area of the former Tambon Muak Lek was split into three tambon containing 33 villages, and formed a new district named Muak Lek. The new district started operation on 21 January 1969. On 7 May 1970 the permanent district office building was opened.

In 1988 the northwestern area was split off from the district to form the new Wang Muang district.

== Geography ==
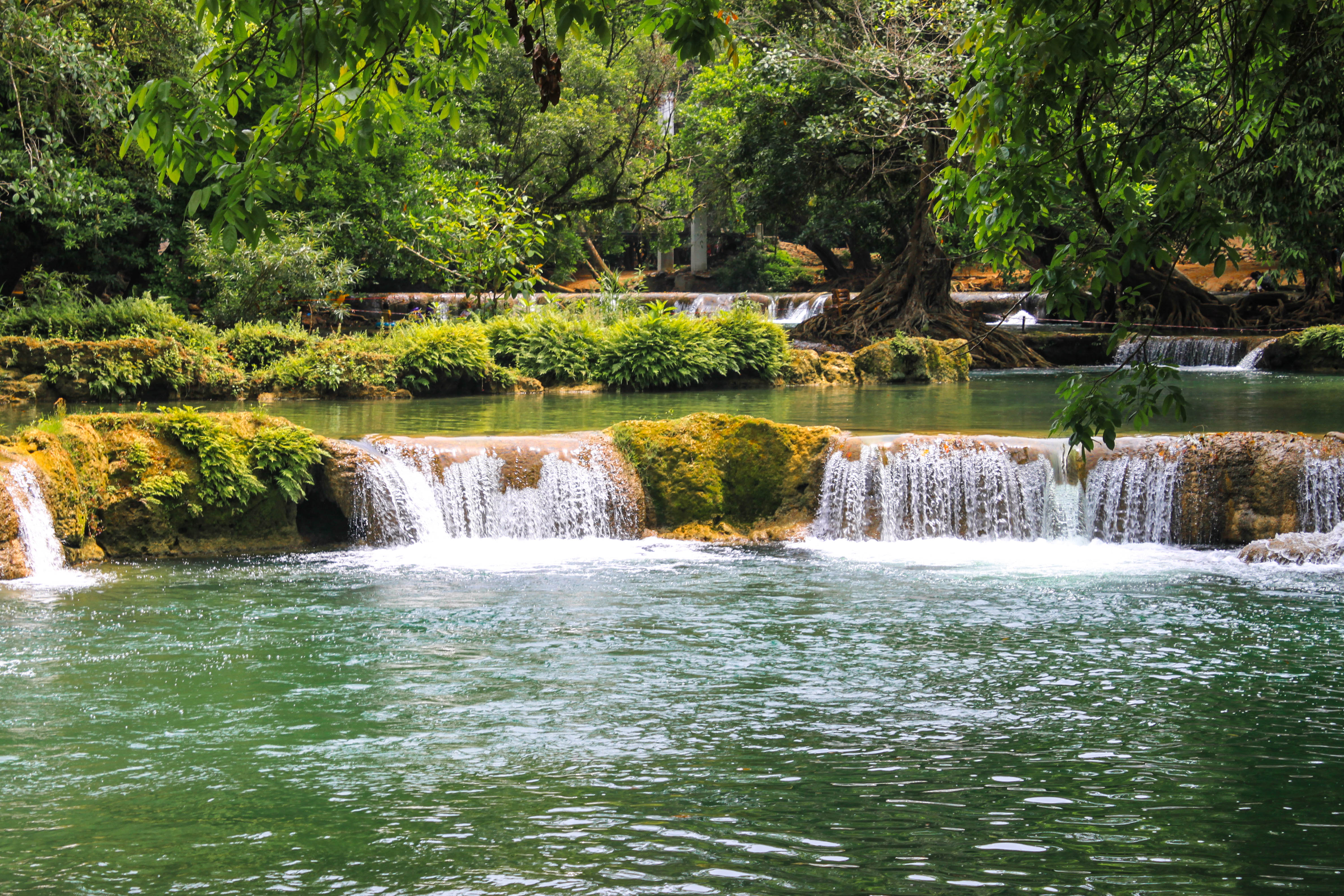
Chet Sao Noi Waterfalls

Muak Lek, in the east of the province, is the second-largest district of Saraburi by area. Neighbouring districts are from the north clockwise: Phatthana Nikhom, Tha Luang, and Lam Sonthi of Lopburi province; Sikhio and Pak Chong of Nakhon Ratchasima province; Mueang Nakhon Nayok of Nakhon Nayok province; and Kaeng Khoi and Wang Muang of Saraburi.

The district lies in the hills of the Dong Phaya Yen Mountains, which separate central Thailand from the northeastern region (Isan). Khao Yai National Park occupies part of the district at its southern end. Khlong Muak Lek, a stream originating from Khao Yai, separates Muak Lek district from Pak Chong as it flows northwards to join the Pa Sak River. Muak Lek town lies on the western bank of the stream, with the Muak Lek Waterfall in its vicinity. The Chet Sao Noi Waterfalls lie downstream to the north, and the eponymous national park covers forested hill areas in the vicinity.

== Economy ==
The majority of Muak Lek district's population practice agriculture, with maize being the most common crop. Dairy farming is an important component of Muak Lek's economy, the district being a major centre of dairy production in the country as it is home to the headquarters of the state enterprise the Dairy Farming Promotion Organization of Thailand (DPO), in Mittraphap Sub-district.

Tourism also contributes to the district's economy, its natural attractions, agritourism and outdoor activities attracting visitors who usually visit along with further attractions in Pak Chong district's Khao Yai area. Several resorts and Scout camps are located in the district. The campus of Asia-Pacific International University is also in Muak Lek, just west of the town, as is the new campus of the Royal Thai Air Force Academy. Some quarries of the cement factories in neighbouring Kaeng Khoi district also extend into Muak Lek's area.

== Transport ==
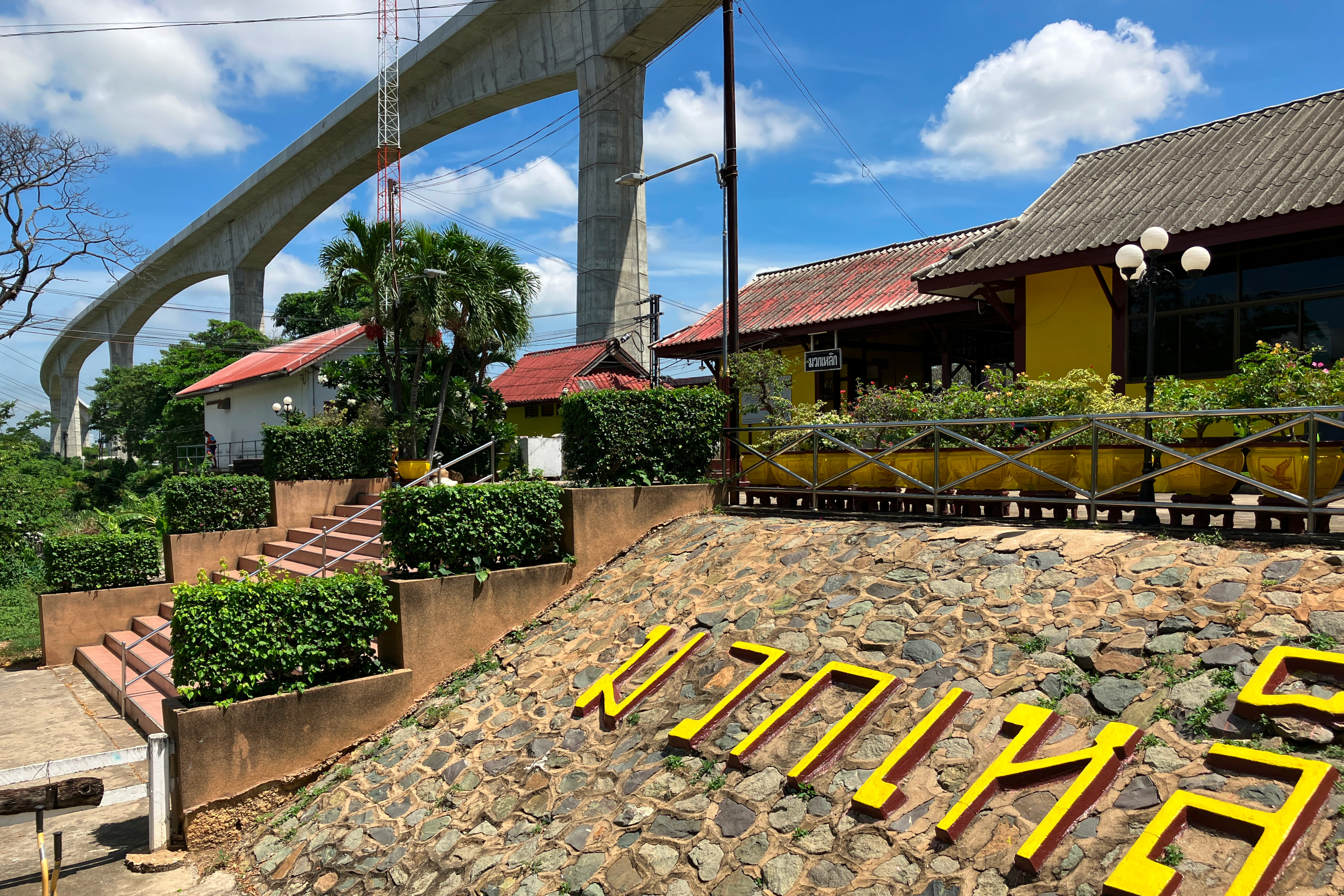
The old Muak Lek Railway Station, with the new viaduct passing overhead

The district is crossed by Mittraphap Road—designated National Highway 2—and the northeastern railway line on their way through the hills and into Isan. The under-construction (as of 2022) Motorway 6, with an access ramp serving Muak Lek, is expected to supplant Mittraphap as the most direct route from Bangkok to Nakhon Ratchasima.

As Khlong Muak Lek forms a valley between the surrounding hills, the original railway was forced to snake through the area in a large U shape as it passed the town to the east. As part of infrastructure work to upgrade the railway to double-track from 2016 to 2024, a 50-metre (160 ft)-high viaduct—the first of its kind in Thailand—was built to cross over the valley and the town altogether. A new station was built 3 kilometres (1.9 mi) west of the original location.

== Administration ==
The district is divided into six sub-districts (tambons), which are further subdivided into 65 villages (mubans). Muak Lek itself has township status (thesaban tambon) and covers parts of tambons Muak Lek and Mittraphap. There are six tambon administrative organizations (TAO).

No.	Name	Thai name	Villages	Pop.
1.	Muak Lek	มวกเหล็ก	13	9,925
2.	Mittraphap	มิตรภาพ	10	10,448
4.	Nong Yang Suea	หนองย่างเสือ	14	6,318
5.	Lam Somphung	ลำสมพุง	10	4,468
7.	Lam Phaya Klang	ลำพญากลาง	18	11,305
9.	Sap Sanun	ซับสนุ่น	15	7,108

The missing numbers 3, 6 and 8 were the tambon which now forms Wang Muang.
