= Wang Sai =

Wang Sai วังไทร
- Tambon
- Interactive map of Wang Sai
- Coordinates: 14°41′39″N 101°32′30″E
- Country: Thailand
- Province: Nakhon Ratchasima
- Amphoe: Pak Chong

Population (2020)
  - Total: 11,431
- Time zone: UTC+7 (TST)
- Postal code: 30130
- TIS 1099: 302111

Wang Sai (Thai: วังไทร) is a tambon (subdistrict) of Pak Chong District, in Nakhon Ratchasima Province, Thailand. In 2020 it had a total population of 11,431 people.

== History ==
The subdistrict was created effective August 1, 1984 by splitting off 5 administrative villages from Nong Sarai.

== Administration ==
=== Central administration ===
The tambon is subdivided into 18 administrative villages (muban).

No.	Name	Thai
1.	Ban Hin Phoeng	บ้านหินเพิง
2.	Ban Wang Sai	บ้านวังไทร
3.	Ban Sap Noi	บ้านซับน้อย
4.	Ban Nong Kae	บ้านหนองแก
5.	Ban Hin Dat	บ้านหินดาด
6.	Ban Pa Takhian	บ้านป่าตะเคียน
7.	Ban Kut Ngong	บ้านกุดโง้ง
8.	Ban Khlong Hin Pun	บ้านคลองหินปูน
9.	Ban Makha Phrong	บ้านมะค่าโพรง
10.	Ban Mo Sai Thong	บ้านมอทรายทอง
11.	Ban Hin Phoeng Nuea	บ้านหินเพิงเหนือ
12.	Ban Pa Oi	บ้านป่าอ้อย
13.	Ban Khao Noi	บ้านเขาน้อย
14.	Ban Phu Thai Phatthana	บ้านภูไทพัฒนา
15.	Ban Taluk Chaeng	บ้านตะลุกแจง
16.	Ban Phu Ngoen	บ้านภูเงิน
17.	Ban Nong Phai Phatthana	บ้านหนองไผ่พัฒนา
18.	Ban Khlong Hin Lap	บ้านคลองหินลับ

=== Local administration ===
The whole area of the subdistrict is covered by the subdistrict municipality (Thesaban Tambon) Wang Sai (เทศบาลตำบลวังไทร).
