= Khok Kruat railway station =

Railway station in Khok Kruat, Thailand

Coordinates: 14°55′51.5″N 101°57′32.2″E

Khok Kruat โคกกรวด

General information
- Location: Tessaban Khok Kruat 5 Rd, Khok Kruat Sub-District, Mueang Nakhon Ratchasima District; Nakhon Ratchasima Province; Thailand
- Operator: State Railway of Thailand (SRT)
- Manager: Ministry of Transport
- Line: Ubon Ratchathani Main Line
- Platforms: 1
- Tracks: 2

Construction
- Structure type: At-grade
- Architectural style: Colonial architecture

Other information
- Station code: คก.
- Classification: Class 3

Services
Preceding station	State Railway of Thailand	Following station
Kut Chik towards Hua Lamphong or Krung Thep Aphiwat	Northeastern Line	Phu Khao Lat towards Ubon Ratchathani or Khamsavath (Laos)
Location

Khok Kruat railway station (Thai: สถานีรถไฟโคกกรวด) is a railway station in Isan region (northeastern Thailand), located in Khok Kruat Sub-District, Mueang Nakhon Ratchasima District, Nakhon Ratchasima Province (Korat). The station is classified as the third class of railway station and is 249.94 km (155 mi) from Bangkok railway station (Hua Lamphong).

The station building is a striking high space under the colonial-style wooden building, built circa 1937.

A serial killer, Somkid Phumphuang who was a dubbed "Thai Jack the Ripper", while fleeing the arrest of the police, was arrested on the train on the morning of December 18, 2019 at Pak Chong railway station as the police received intelligence from a young student who boarded the same train as him at this station.

== Train services ==
- Ordinary train No. 233/234 Bangkok–Surin –Bangkok
- Local train No. 431/432 Kaeng Khoi Junction–Khon Kaen–Kaeng Khoi Junction
