= Mu Si =

Coordinates: 14.534°N 101.379111°E

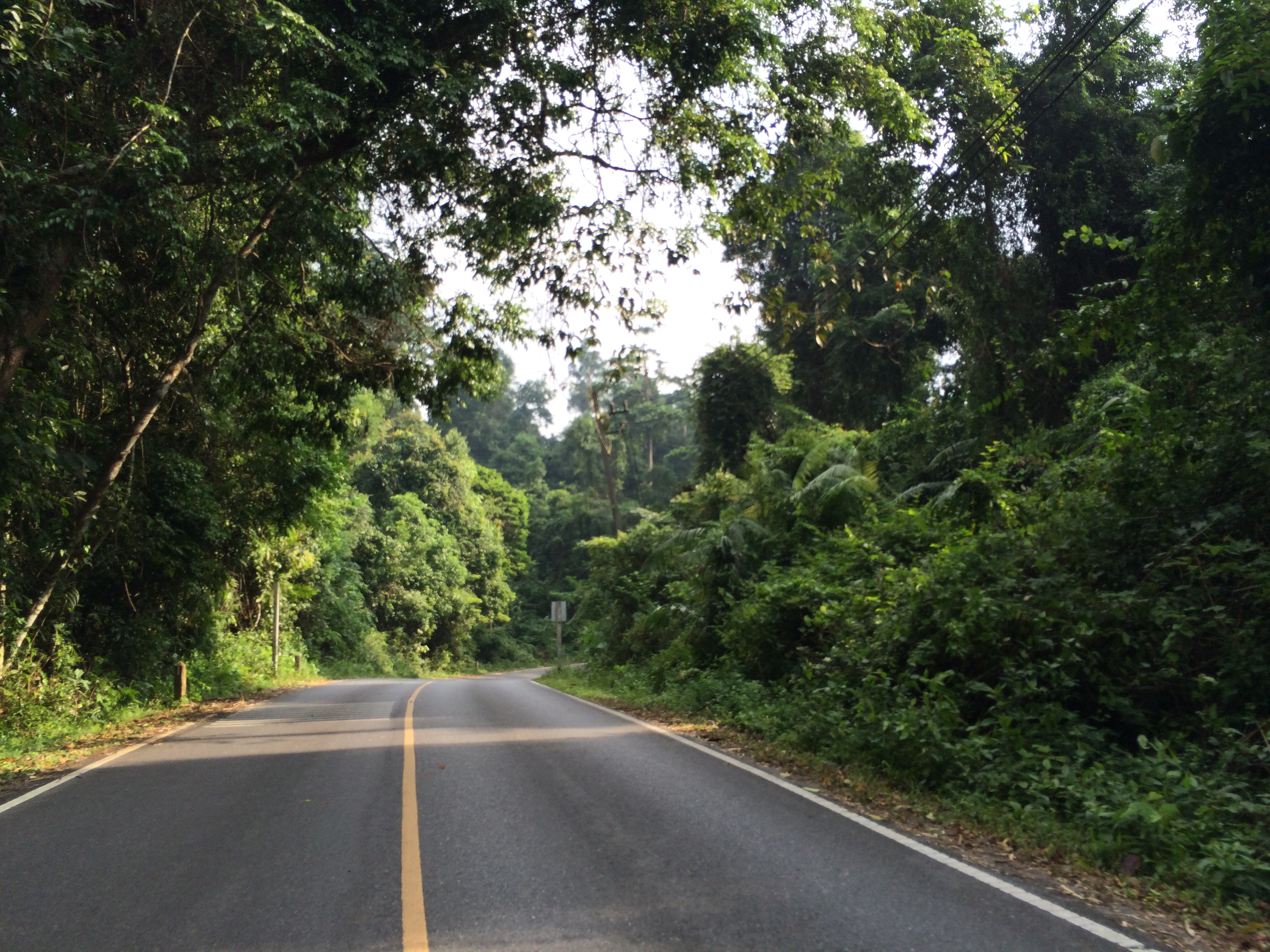
Thanarat Road in the area of Mu Si

Mu Si (Thai: หมูสี, pronounced [mǔːsǐː]) is a tambon (subdistrict) of Pak Chong District, Nakhon Ratchasima Province, northeast Thailand.

== Description ==
Mu Si is an area adjacent to the Khao Yai National Park, the largest and most fertile forest in the country. Therefore, there are often wild animals such as elephants invading to find food in the farmland of the locals.

The term "Mu Si" is the name of a native coconut types.

== Geography ==
Most of the area is plain at the foothills, with an area of 109.19 square kilometers or 68,244.50 rai or 378 square kilometers (including Khao Yai National Park).

Surrounding areas include (from north clockwise): Nong Nam Daeng and Khanong Phra in its district, Pong Talong in its district, Nakhon Nayok and Prachinburi Provinces, Phaya Yen in its district, respectively.

== Transportation ==
Thanarat Road (Highway 2090) is a main thoroughfare that cuts through the area including Khao Yai National Park. The road bridging Mu Si with Nakhon Nayok and Prachinburi Provinces.

== Administration ==
Mu Si is governed by the Subdistrict-Municipality Mu Si (เทศบาลตำบลหมูสี).

The area also consists of 19 administrative villages (muban).

No.	Name	Thai
1.	Ban Bung Toei	บ้านบุ่งเตย
2.	Ban Mai Samakkhi	บ้านใหม่สามัคคี
3.	Ban Tha Maprang	บ้านท่ามะปราง
4.	Ban Mu Si	บ้านหมูสี
5.	Ban Khud Khla	บ้านกุดคล้า
6.	Ban Khlong Duea	บ้านคลองเดื่อ
7.	Ban Rai	บ้านไร่
8.	Ban Khlong Din Dam	บ้านคลองดินดำ
9.	Ban Luead Thai	บ้านเลือดไทย
10.	Ban Haew Pla Kang	บ้านเหวปลากั้ง
11.	Ban Wang Ton Tone	บ้านวังโต่นโต้น
12.	Ban Tha Chang Tai	บ้านท่าช้างใต้
13.	Ban Wang Pradu	บ้านวังประดู่
14.	Ban Ko Kaeo	บ้านเกาะแก้ว
15.	Ban Khlong Suea	บ้านคลองเสือ
16.	Ban Tha Chang Nuea	บ้านท่าช้างเหนือ
17.	Ban Khlong Phen	บ้านคลองเพล
18.	Ban Uthum Phon Pattana	บ้านอุทุมพรพัฒนา
19.	Ban Khlong Pun	บ้านคลองปูน

== Tourism ==
Mu Si has a large sunflower field. The ripe sunflower seeds are a food source for a large flock of red-breasted parakeets that fly from the Khao Yai forestland every day from 06.00–08.00 hrs, creating colours and excitement for visitors.
