= Lam Takhong Dam =

- Location within Thailand
- Official name: เขื่อนลำตะคอง
- Country: Thailand
- Location: Pak Chong and Sikhio, Nakhon Ratchasima
- Coordinates: 14°51′54″N 101°33′37″E
- Status: In use
- Opening date: 1974
- Owner: Electricity Generating Authority of Thailand

Dam and spillways
- Type of dam: Earth core rockfill dam
- Impounds: Lam Takhong River
- Height: 40.3 m (132 ft)
- Length: 251 m (823 ft)

Reservoir
- Creates: Lam Takhong Dam Reservoir
- Total capacity: 310×10^{6} m^{3} (251,321 acre⋅ft)

Power Station
- Operator: Electricity Generating Authority of Thailand
- Commission date: 2002
- Turbines: 2 x 250 MW reversible pump-generators
- Installed capacity: 500 MW
- Annual generation: 400 GWh

The Lam Takhong Dam (Thai: เขื่อนลำตะคอง, RTGS: Khuean Lam Takhong, pronounced [kʰɯ̀a̯n lām tā.kʰɔ̄ːŋ]) is an embankment dam on the Lam Takhong River between Pak Chong District and Sikhio District in Nakhon Ratchasima Province, Thailand. The dam was originally constructed in 1974 for the purposes of irrigation and water supply but after 2002, its water storage also serves as the lower reservoir for the Lam Takhong pumped storage power plant, Thailand's first power plant of that type.

== Background ==
Construction on the Lam Takhong Dam began in 1969 and was completed in 1974, while the pumped storage project was initially proposed in 1975. From 1989 to 1991, the Japan International Cooperation Agency funded a feasibility study. Khon Kaen University conducted an environmental impact assessment beginning in 1991 and by 1994, the project was approved for construction. The project was to be constructed in two 500 MW phases. The first phase began in December 1995 and was completed in 2001, with the first two 250 MW generators operational in August 2002. After the 1997 Asian financial crisis, Phase 2 never began. The power plant and its components were constructed underground to preserve the nature and scenery of the area. During construction, various complaints were raised about the blasting of the upper reservoir. The dust from blasting reportedly had negative effects on locals and their farms.

== Design and operation ==
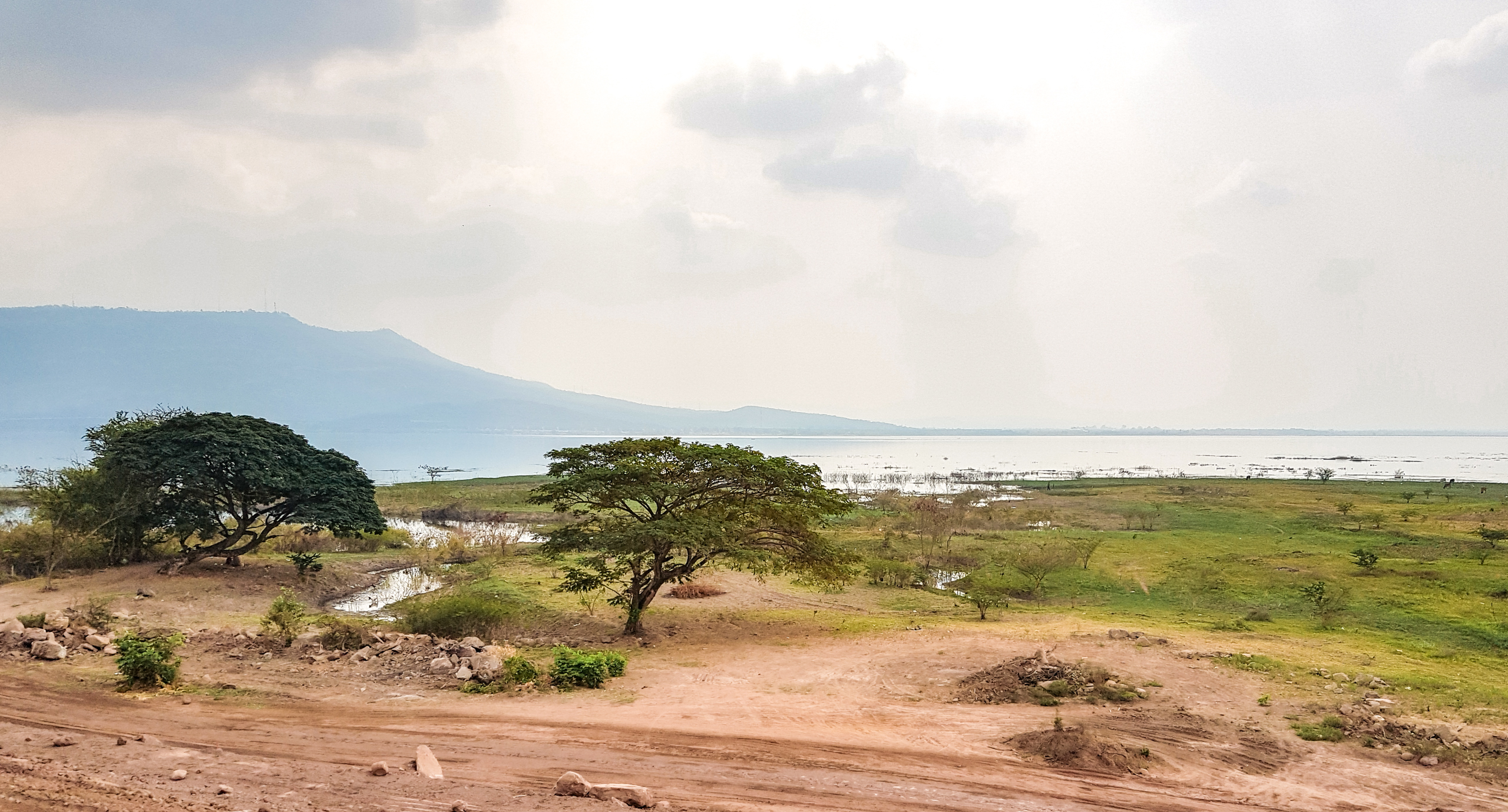
Lam Takhong Reservoir as seen from an express train on the northern shore

The Lam Takhong Dam is a 251 m (823 ft) long and 40.3 m (132 ft) high earth-fill embankment dam. It creates a reservoir with a capacity of 310,000,000 m^{3} (251,321 acre⋅ft). The upper reservoir 17°14′31″N 99°00′58″E is located 6.8 km (4 mi) southwest of the main dam on top of a hill. The upper reservoir is created by an asphalt lining 2,170 m (7,119 ft) long and 50 m (164 ft) high. It has a capacity of 10,300,000 m^{3} (8,350 acre⋅ft) and surface area of 0.34 km^{2} (0.13 sq mi). The power station is a pumped-storage type and contains two 250 MW reversible pump-generators. Water is a first pumped to the upper reservoir and then during peak-demand hours, it is sent back down to the power station for power production. This process repeats itself. The power station is connected to the upper reservoir via two 650 m (2,133 ft) long, 6 m (20 ft) diameter penstocks. Water returning from the power station does so via two 1,430 m (4,692 ft) long, 6.8 m (22 ft) diameter tailrace tunnels.

In September 2014, EGAT awarded a US$64.3 million contract to Voith Hydro to supply electromechanical equipment for the expansion of the facility. The expansion will more than double Lam Takhong's current output capacity. When complete, total capacity of the pumped storage plant will be 1,000 MW—500 MW from two units installed in Phase 1 and 500 MW from two units installed in Phase 2. The expansion is expected to be completed in 2018.

== See also ==
- List of power stations in Thailand
- Mekong River Commission
