= Pak Chong railway station =

Railway station in Thailand

Coordinates: 14.7049°N 101.4106°E

Pak Chong ปากช่อง
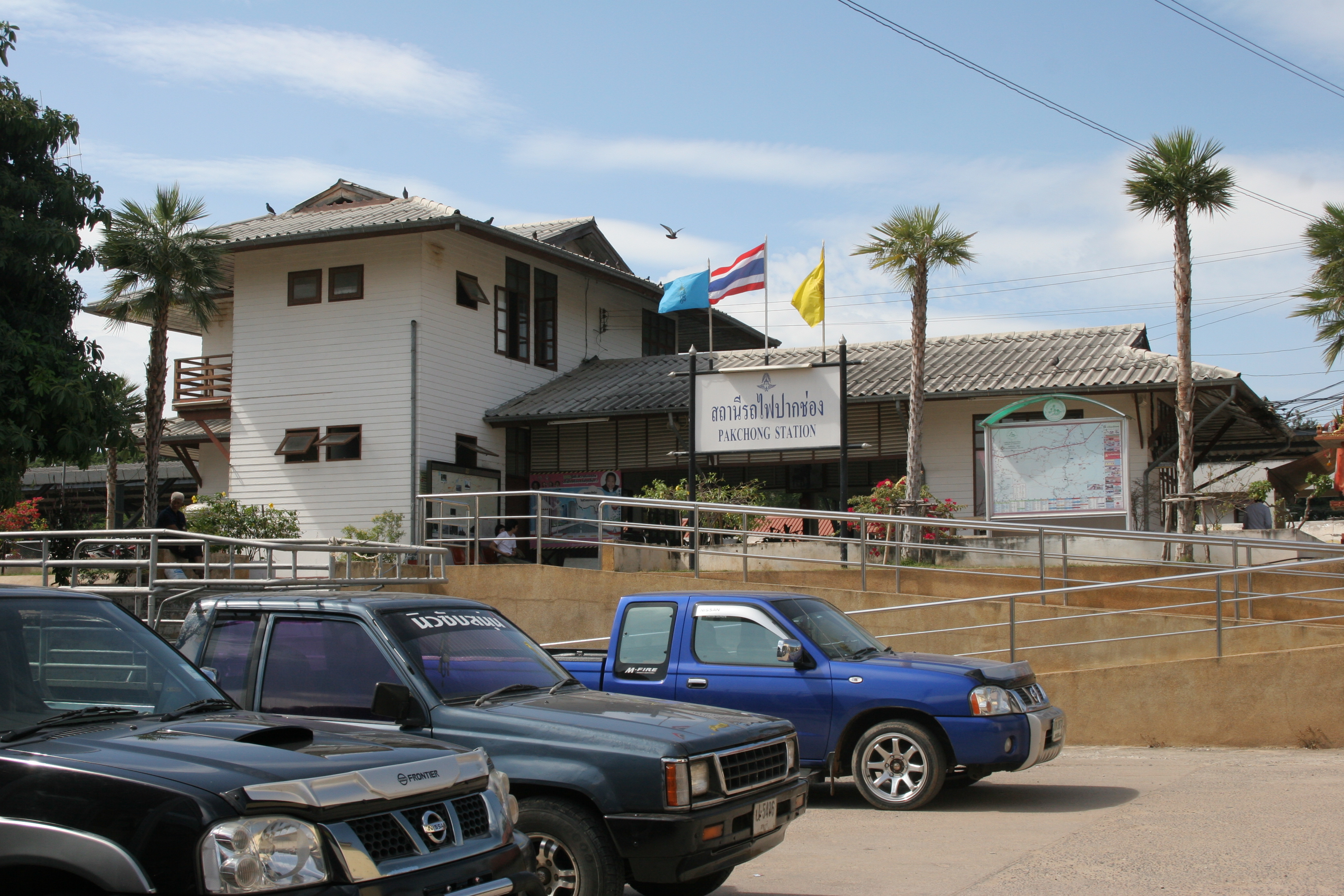
- Pak Chong Railway Station in 2013

General information
- Location: Pak Chong Subdistrict, Pak Chong District; Nakhon Ratchasima Province; Thailand
- Operator: State Railway of Thailand
- Manager: Ministry of Transport
- Line: Ubon Ratchathani Main Line
- Platforms: 2
- Tracks: 8

Construction
- Structure type: At-grade
- Parking: Yes

Other information
- Station code: ปช.
- Classification: Class 1

History
- Opened: May 1899

Services
Preceding station	State Railway of Thailand	Following station
Bandai Ma towards Hua Lamphong or Krung Thep Aphiwat	Northeastern Line	Sap Muang towards Ubon Ratchathani or Khamsavath (Laos)
Location

Pak Chong railway station is a railway station located in Pak Chong Subdistrict, Pak Chong District, Nakhon Ratchasima. It is a class 1 railway station located 179.93 km (111.8 mi) from Bangkok railway station. It opened in May 1899 as part of the Northeastern Line Muak Lek–Pak Chong section. The line continued to Nakhon Ratchasima in December 1900. It is the nearest and most accessible station for Khao Yai National Park. It is currently being reconstructed as part of the double-tracking project between Map Kabao and Thanon Chira Junction.

== Train services ==
- Special Express No. 21/22 Bangkok–Ubon Ratchathani–Bangkok
- Express No. 67/68 Bangkok–Ubon Ratchathani–Bangkok
- Express No. 71/72 Bangkok–Si Sa Ket–Bangkok
- Express No. 73/74 Bangkok–Sikhoraphum–Bangkok
- Express No. 77/78 Bangkok–Nong Khai–Bangkok
- Rapid No. 135/136 Bangkok–Ubon Ratchathani–Bangkok
- Rapid No. 139/140 Bangkok–Ubon Ratchathani–Bangkok
- Rapid No. 141/142 Bangkok–Ubon Ratchathani–Bangkok
- Rapid No. 145/146 Bangkok–Ubon Ratchathani–Bangkok
- Ordinary No. 233/234 Bangkok–Surin–Bangkok
- Local No. 431/432 Kaeng Khoi Junction–Khon Kaen–Kaeng Khoi Junction
