= Chaiyaphum =

Chaiyaphum ชัยภูมิ
- Town
- เทศบาลเมืองชัยภูมิ
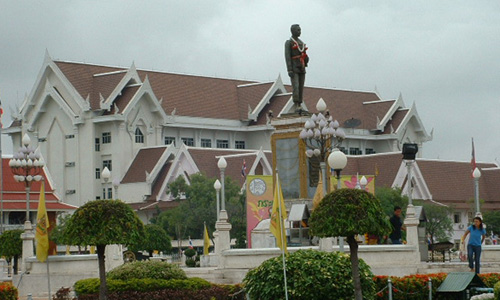
- Chaiyaphum Town Hall

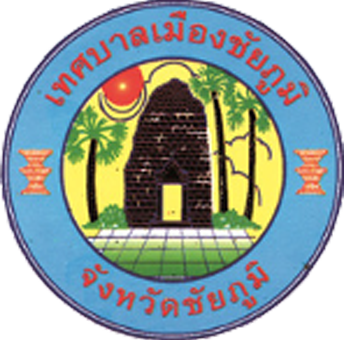
- Seal

- Location in Thailand
- Coordinates: 15°48′20″N 102°01′52″E
- Country: Thailand
- Province: Chaiyaphum
- District: Mueang Chaiyaphum

Government
  - Mayor: Banyong Kiatkongchuchai

Area
  - Total: 30.78 km^{2} (11.88 sq mi)
- Elevation: 185 m (607 ft)

Population (2015)
  - Total: 58,350
- Time zone: UTC+7 (ICT)
- Area code: (+66) 44
- Website: chaiyaphummunicipality.com

Chaiyaphum (Thai: ชัยภูมิ, pronounced [tɕʰāj.jā.pʰūːm]; Northeastern Thai: ไซยภูมิ, pronounced [sa᷇j.ɲā.pʰu᷇ːm]) is a town (thesaban mueang) in northeastern Thailand, capital of Chaiyaphum Province. As of 2015 it had a population of 58,350, and covers the full tambon Nai Mueang of Mueang Chaiyaphum District. Chaiyaphum is 337 road kilometres northeast of Bangkok.

As of 2021, there are wild elephants in the town.

== Geography ==
Chaiyaphum lies on the Khorat Plateau at 185 metres (607 ft) elevation. The land in the immediate vicinity of the city is flat, but the Phetchabun Mountains rise to the west.

== Climate ==
Chaiyaphum has a tropical savanna climate (Köppen climate classification Aw). Winters are dry and warm. Temperatures rise until April, which is very hot with the average daily maximum at 36.4 °C (97.5 °F). The monsoon season is from late April to October, with heavy rain and somewhat cooler temperatures during the day, although nights remain warm.

Climate data for Chaiyaphum (1991–2020, extremes 1957-present)
Month	Jan	Feb	Mar	Apr	May	Jun	Jul	Aug	Sep	Oct	Nov	Dec	Year
Record high °C (°F)	38.4 (101.1)	39.6 (103.3)	41.5 (106.7)	43.5 (110.3)	42.3 (108.1)	38.5 (101.3)	37.6 (99.7)	37.7 (99.9)	35.7 (96.3)	33.5 (92.3)	37.1 (98.8)	35.8 (96.4)	43.5 (110.3)
Mean daily maximum °C (°F)	31.2 (88.2)	33.6 (92.5)	35.8 (96.4)	36.6 (97.9)	35.0 (95.0)	33.9 (93.0)	32.9 (91.2)	32.2 (90.0)	32.1 (89.8)	31.8 (89.2)	31.5 (88.7)	30.4 (86.7)	33.1 (91.6)
Daily mean °C (°F)	24.6 (76.3)	26.7 (80.1)	29.1 (84.4)	30.1 (86.2)	29.2 (84.6)	28.8 (83.8)	28.2 (82.8)	27.6 (81.7)	27.5 (81.5)	27.2 (81.0)	26.1 (79.0)	24.4 (75.9)	27.5 (81.4)
Mean daily minimum °C (°F)	19.0 (66.2)	20.8 (69.4)	23.5 (74.3)	25.0 (77.0)	25.2 (77.4)	25.1 (77.2)	24.7 (76.5)	24.3 (75.7)	24.2 (75.6)	23.6 (74.5)	21.5 (70.7)	19.2 (66.6)	23.0 (73.4)
Record low °C (°F)	6.3 (43.3)	11.5 (52.7)	13.1 (55.6)	17.9 (64.2)	18.0 (64.4)	21.9 (71.4)	21.3 (70.3)	21.4 (70.5)	21.0 (69.8)	14.6 (58.3)	10.4 (50.7)	6.8 (44.2)	6.3 (43.3)
Average precipitation mm (inches)	8.9 (0.35)	7.2 (0.28)	51.4 (2.02)	88.5 (3.48)	147.8 (5.82)	133.2 (5.24)	129.2 (5.09)	215.2 (8.47)	237.8 (9.36)	109.7 (4.32)	16.0 (0.63)	5.6 (0.22)	1,150.5 (45.30)
Average precipitation days (≥ 1.0 mm)	0.7	1.2	3.6	5.4	11.1	9.6	10.7	12.6	14.1	7.3	1.3	0.5	78.1
Average relative humidity (%)	61.6	58.6	59.5	63.9	73.2	74.4	76.4	79.1	81.2	74.9	66.9	62.5	69.4
Average dew point °C (°F)	16.2 (61.2)	17.2 (63.0)	19.6 (67.3)	21.8 (71.2)	23.5 (74.3)	23.5 (74.3)	23.3 (73.9)	23.4 (74.1)	23.7 (74.7)	22.0 (71.6)	19.0 (66.2)	16.3 (61.3)	20.8 (69.4)
Mean monthly sunshine hours	279.0	245.8	275.9	240.0	195.3	153.0	120.9	117.8	144.0	198.4	252.0	260.4	2,482.5
Mean daily sunshine hours	9.0	8.7	8.9	8.0	6.3	5.1	3.9	3.8	4.8	6.4	8.4	8.4	6.8
Source 1: World Meteorological Organization
Source 2: Office of Water Management and Hydrology, Royal Irrigation Department (sun 1981–2010)(extremes)

== Transportation ==
Route 201 begins in Chum Phae, and runs past Chaiyaphum (without actually entering the town) to Mittraphap near Sikhio. Route 202 leads east to Yasothon, Amnat Charoen, and the border with Laos at Khemarat. Route 225 leads west to Nakhon Sawan.

== Education ==
Chaiyabhumbhakdeechumphon School is located in the town.
