= Thai wine =

Wine making in Thailand

The Thai wine industry began development in the late twentieth century. As a tropical country, Thailand lies well outside the latitudes traditionally regarded as suitable for cultivating grapes for winemaking, though the development of adaptive viticulture techniques has allowed for some success, and Thai wines have become recognized among a growing range of new-latitude wines.

Grapes had been introduced to Thailand when the French embassy sent by Louis XIV presented specimens of White Malaga (Beba) to King Narai.

The grapes were used solely for fruit until well into the twentieth century, when a wine industry started to develop. The majority comes from two regions: Hua Hin on the northwest gulf of Thailand coast and the Khao Yai area in the foothills of the national park of the same name.

The grapes are forced by pruning into bearing two crops a year; the fine wines are those that ripen during the (relatively) dry season, while a vin de table is made from the wet season crop. Other vinifera grapes such as Chenin blanc and Shiraz are becoming popular.
