= Lam Takhong =

Coordinates: 14°52′22″N 101°44′52″E

- Native name: ลำตะคอง (Thai)

Location
- Country: Thailand

Physical characteristics
- Source
  - location: Khao Yai National Park
  - elevation: 782 m (2,566 ft)
- Mouth
  - location: Mun River
  - elevation: 167 m (548 ft)
- Length: 187.96 km (116.79 mi)

Lam Takhong (Thai: ลำตะคอง, pronounced [lām tā.kʰɔ̄ːŋ]; Northeastern Thai: ลำตะคอง, pronounced [lâm tā.kʰɔ̂ːŋ]) is a watercourse in Thailand and a tributary of the Mun River in northeastern Thailand. It is impounded by the Lam Takhong Dam.
