= Khao Yai area =

Resort destination in Thailand

The Khao Yai area is a resort destination in Pak Chong district of Nakhon Ratchasima province, Thailand. It covers the south of the district, adjacent to Khao Yai National Park.

Agritourism draws visitors to major farms and vineyards, Khao Yai being one of Thailand's two wine-producing regions along with Hua Hin. Numerous resorts, golf clubs, cafés, art galleries and shopping centres are scattered throughout the area, many of which feature novelty European-themed architectural styles and cater to domestic tourists, mainly the Bangkok middle-class. Development of holiday properties is a major driver of real estate development in the Khao Yai area.
