= Wang Muang district =

Wang Muang วังม่วง
- District
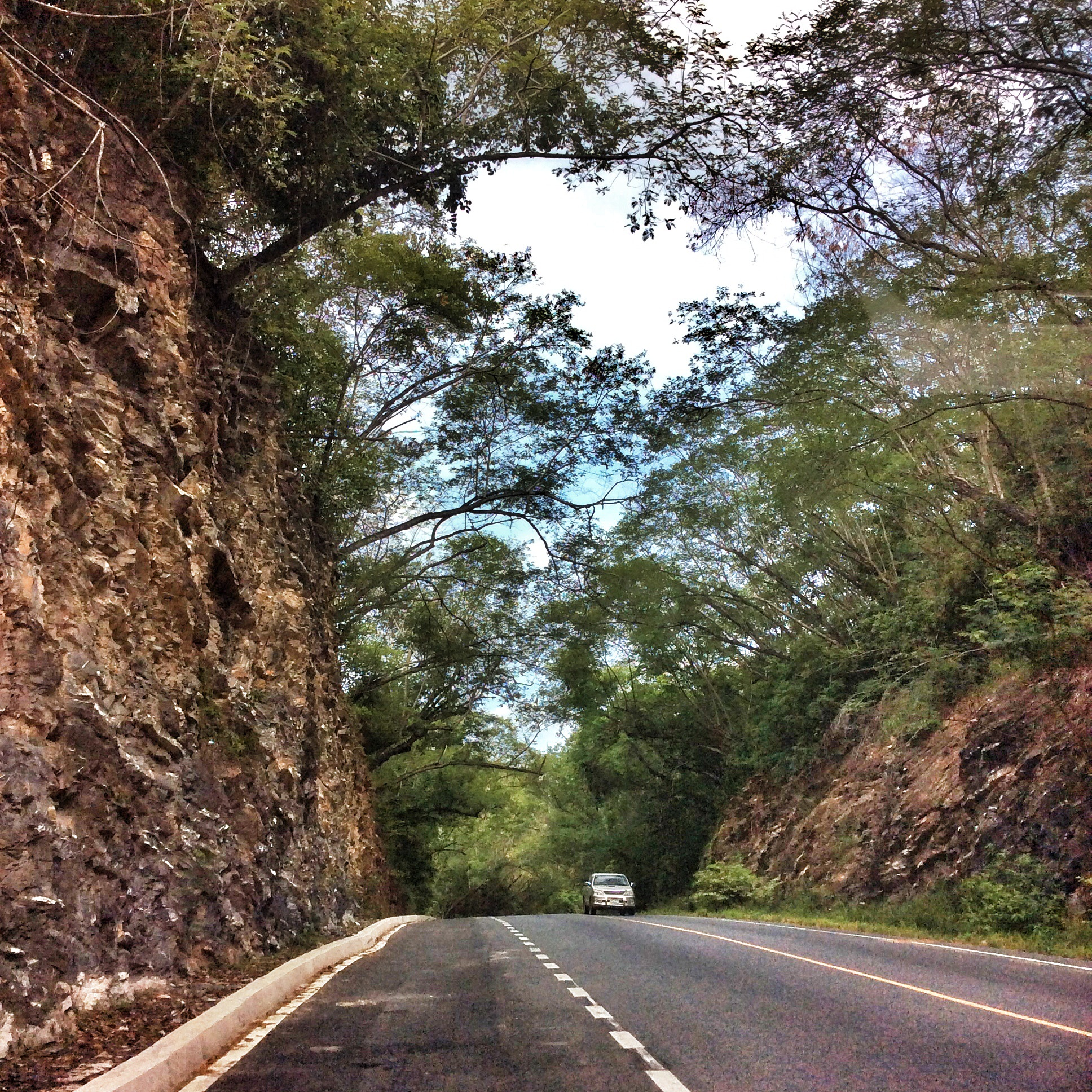
- The pass on highway 2089

- District location in Saraburi province
- Coordinates: 14°50′44″N 101°8′4″E
- Country: Thailand
- Province: Saraburi
- Seat: Wang Muang

Area
  - Total: 338.0 km^{2} (130.5 sq mi)

Population (2005)
  - Total: 17,536
  - Density: 51.88/km^{2} (134.4/sq mi)
- Time zone: UTC+7 (ICT)
- Postal code: 18220
- Geocode: 1912

Wang Muang (Thai: วังม่วง, pronounced [wāŋ mûaŋ]) is a district (amphoe) in the northern part of Saraburi province, central Thailand.

== History ==
The district was created as a minor district (king amphoe) on 1 April 1990, with three tambons taken from Muak Lek district. It was upgraded to full district status on 7 September 1995.

== Geography ==
Neighboring districts are (from the north clockwise) Phatthana Nikhom of Lopburi province and Muak Lek and Kaeng Khoi of Saraburi Province.

== Administration ==
The district is divided into three sub-districts (tambons), which are further subdivided into 31 villages (mubans). Wang Muang is the only township (thesaban tambon), covering parts of tambons Wang Muang and Kham Phran. There are three tambon administrative organizations (TAO).

No.	Name	Thai name	Villages	Pop.
1.	Salaeng Phan	แสลงพัน	5	2,616
2.	Kham Phran	คำพราน	9	6,511
3.	Wang Muang	วังม่วง	17	8,409
