= Sikhio Town =

Coordinates: 14°54′N 101°43′E

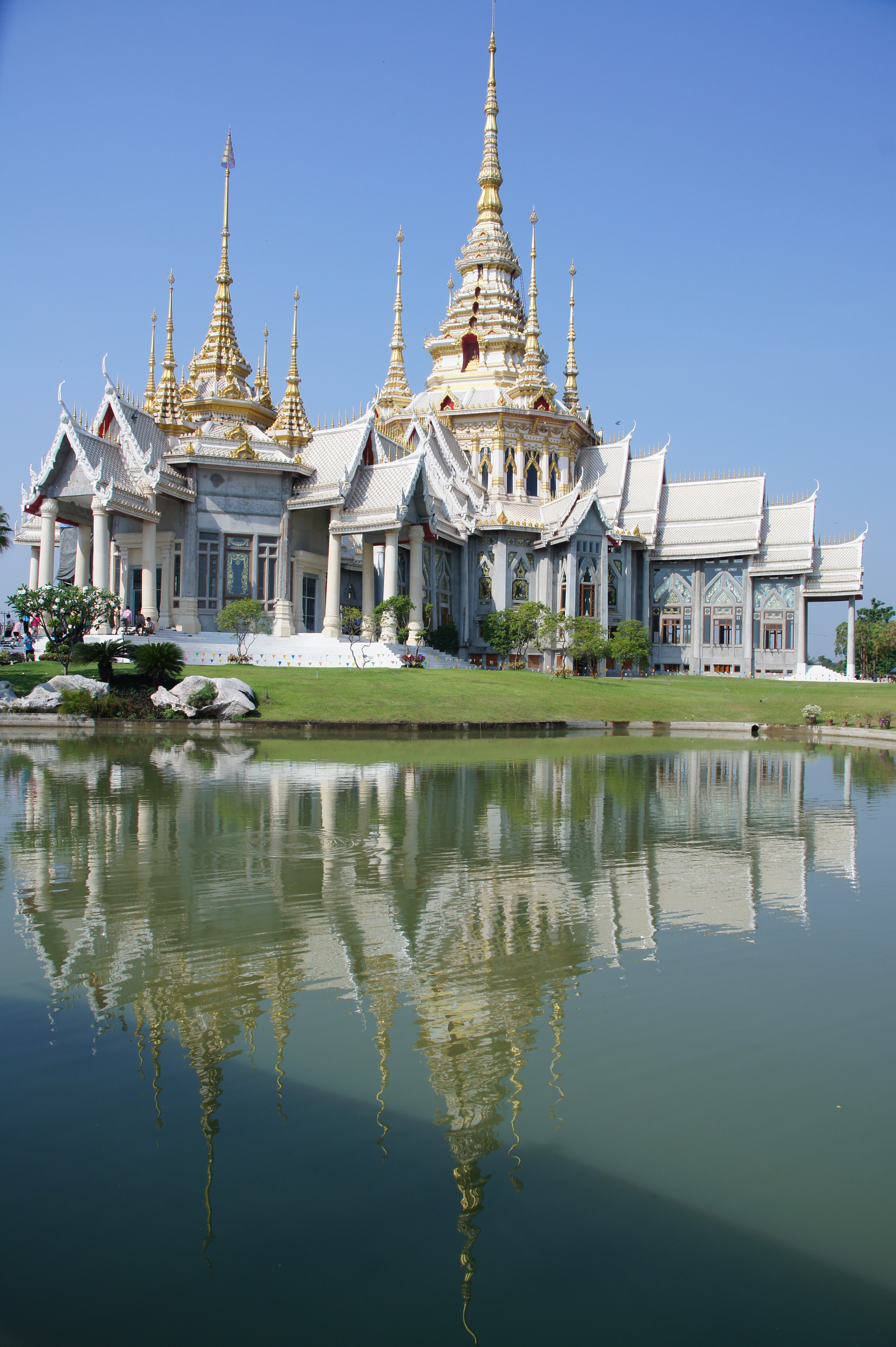
The Great Hall of Wat Luang Phor Toh

Sikhio (Thai: สีคิ้ว) is the central town of Sikhio District, Nakhon Ratchasima Province, northeastern Thailand. It covers parts of the sub-districts Sikhio and Mittraphab, a total area of 11.63 km^{2}. As of 2007 it had a population of 18,663. The town is subdivided into 19 boroughs (chumchon).

== History ==
Sikhio was established as a sanitary district (sukhaphiban) in 1956. In 1966 the area of the district was enlarged. Like all sanitary districts, it was upgraded to a sub-district municipality (thesaban tambon) in 1999. Effective 31 January 2008 it was upgraded to a town (thesaban mueang).

== Transport ==
Sikhio is on the northeastern railway connecting Bangkok with Nakhon Ratchasima. Mittraphap Road passes south of town.
