= Burmese names =

Burmese names (Burmese: မြန်မာ အမည်) lack the serial structure of most Western names. Like other Mainland Southeast Asian people (except Vietnamese), the people of Myanmar have no customary matronymic or patronymic naming system and no tradition of surnames. Although other Mainland Southeast Asian countries such as Thailand, Laos, Cambodia, and Malaysia introduced the use of surnames or patronyms in the early 20th century, Myanmar never introduced the use of surnames and lacks surnames in the modern day. Instead, Burmese names use an honorific prefix to reflect the person's stage in life and position in society.

== Traditional and Western-style names ==
Burmese names were originally one syllable, as in the cases of U Nu and U Thant ("U" being an honorific). In the mid-20th century, many Burmese started using two syllables, albeit without any formal structure. In the late 1890s, British scholars observed that Arakanese commonly adopted three-syllable names whereas Burmans were still using one or two at most. As they become more familiar with Western culture, Burmese people are gradually increasing the number of syllables in their children's names, by use of various structures. Today, names with up to four syllables are common for men and up to five for women.

Scholars such as Thant Myint-U have argued that the rise of complex Burmese personal names resulted from the collapse of the Burmese monarchy, which ended the sophisticated system of Pali-Burmese styles, crown service and gentry titles, leaving the majority of Burmese with single-syllable names. Former titles, such as min (မင်း; "leader"), were re-appropriated as part of personal names.

For example, Burmese nationalist Aung San's parents were named Pha (ဖာ) and Suu (စု), both of which are single-syllable names. His birth name was Htain Lin (ထိန်လင်း), but he changed his name to Aung San (အောင်ဆန်း) later in life. His child is named Aung San Suu Kyi (အောင်ဆန်းစုကြည်). The first part of her name, "Aung San", is from her father's name at the time of her birth. "Suu" comes from her grandmother. "Kyi" comes from her mother, Khin Kyi (ခင်ကြည်). The addition of the father or mother's name in a person's name is now quite frequent, although it does not denote the development of a family name. Other nomenclature systems are used as well.

The use of the names of one's parents and relatives in personal names has been criticized as an un-Burmese adoption of seriality, although it differs from historical Western practices.

Burman names commonly include Pali-derived words combined with native Burmese words, including:

- Female:
  - sanda (စန္ဒာ "moon", from canda)
  - thanda (သန္တာ "coral", from santa)
  - thiri (သီရိ "splendour", from siri)
  - hawma (ဟေမာ, "frost/snow", compare hima in "Himalayas")
- Male:
  - thura (သူရ "brave, gallant" from sūra)
  - thiha (သီဟ "lion", from sīha)
  - zeya (ဇေယျာ "victory", from jāya)
  - wunna (ဝဏ္ဏ "gold")

Burmese people who marry foreigners or move to countries that use surnames may use their name as if part of it represented a family name. For example, Tun Myint's wife changed her last name to Myint, but Myint is part of his personal name.

== Honorifics ==
Honorifics are additions to a given name, commonly used both in written and spoken communication, especially with shorter names comprising one or two syllables. The practice of using honorifics is widespread across all cultures in the Burmese region. While certain ethnic groups may have unique honorifics, these terms are typically recognized and adopted by other groups rather than being translated.

For instance, Aung San's parents are commonly referred to as U Pha and Daw Suu. While these could be translated as "Mr. Pha" and "Ms. Suu", they are often used in a more informal manner.

Some of the common honorifics used in Burmese culture include:

- Ashin (အရှင် or အသျှင်): Used for monks, Your Majesty, nobles, and occasionally for women (e.g., Ashin Jinarakkhita).
- Binnya, Banya (ဗညား or ဗညာ): Indicates royalty and nobility, derived from the Mon term ဗညာ (e.g., Binnya U).
- Bo, Bogyoke (ဗိုလ် or ဗိုလ်ချုပ်): Used for military officers (e.g., Bogyoke Aung San).
- Baya/Phaya (ဘုရား): Used to address Buddha, kings, monks, bishops, and high-ranking members of royalty.
- Daw (ဒေါ်): Used for mature women or women in senior positions (e.g., Daw Aung San Suu Kyi).
- Duwa (ဒူးဝါး): Used for Kachin chiefs.
- Gyi (ကြီး): Suffix used to show respect (e.g., Khin-gyi Pyaw).
- Khun (ခွန်): Used for Shan men (of Kengtung ancestry such as Khun Htun Oo) and Pa'O men.
- Ko (ကို): Used for men of similar age (e.g., Ko Mya Aye).
- Ma (မ): Used for young women or women of similar age.
- Mahn (မန်း): Used for Kayin (Karen) men (e.g., Mahn Win Maung).
- Maung (abbr. Mg; မောင်): Used to address a man younger than oneself, also commonly used as a prefix for male names.
- Mi (မိ): Used for some young women, usually as a nickname (e.g., Mi Swe), also for Mon women.
- Minh (မင်း): Used for Mon boys, equivalent to Maung (from Mon မာံ).
- Nai (နိုင်): Used for Mon men, equivalent to U (e.g., Nai Shwe Kyin) (from Mon နဲာ).
- Nang (နန်း): Used for Shan women of nobility (from Shan ၼၢင်း).
- Naw (နော်): Used for Karen women, especially in S'gaw Karen.
- Nant (နမ့်): Used for Karen women, especially in West Pwo Karen.
- Nan (နန်း): Used for Karen women, especially in East Pwo Karen; also for Shan women.
- Sai (စိုင်း): Used for Shan men (e.g., Sai Htee Saing) (from Shan ၸၢႆး).
- Salai (ဆလိုင်း): Used for Chin men.
- Sao (စဝ်): Used for Shan royalty (e.g., Sao Shwe Thaik) (from Shan ၸဝ်ႈ).
- Saw (စော): Used for Shan royalty (Burmanized form of Sao) (e.g., Saw Mon Hla); also for Karen men, especially in S'gaw Karen and East Pwo Karen (e.g., Saw Nga Man, Saw Bo Mya).
- Sa (စ): Used for Karen men, especially in West Pwo Karen.
- Sawbwa (စော်ဘွား): Burmese approximation of Shan saopha (ၸဝ်ႈၽႃႉ), used as a suffix for Shan chiefs (e.g., Nyaungshwe Sawbwa Sao Shwe Thaik).
- Saya (ဆရာ): Used for men of senior rank or age in civilian communities, also used for private, lance corporal, corporal in various armed organizations.
- Sayadaw (ဆရာတော်): Used for senior monks (e.g., Sayadaw U Pandita, Sayadaw Taung Galay).
- Sayama (ဆရာမ): Used for female teachers, Pronoun Use.
- Shin (ရှင် or သျှင်): Used for monks and noble men and women (archaic; e.g., Shin Arahan, Shin Ye Htut, Yawei Shin Htwe).
- Thamein (သမိန်): Burmanized form of Mon သၟီ used by Mon royalty (e.g., Smim Htaw).
- Thakin (သခင်): Members of Dobama Asiayone, known as "the Thakins" (archaic; e.g., Thakin Kodaw Hmaing).
- Theippan (သိပ္ပံ): Used for writers (archaic; e.g., Theippan Maung Wa).
- U (ဦး): Used for mature men or men in a senior position and monks (e.g., U Thant, U Nu).
- Pu (ပူး): Used for mature men or men in a senior position and monks in Chin tribal dialects and Mizo language (e.g. Pu Pa Thang)
- Pi (ပီး): Used for mature women or women in a senior position in Chin tribal dialects and Mizo language (e.g. Pi Ni Sui Lian)
- Yebaw (ရဲဘော်): Used to refer to men in revolutionary groups (e.g., Yèbaw Tun Maung).

== Indexing ==
According to The Chicago Manual of Style, Burmese names are indexed by the first element unless this element is an honorific. Honorifics are mentioned after the other elements of the name, separated by a comma, or are not stated at all.

== Astrology-based naming system ==
Many Burmese Buddhists also use astrology (which is determined by the child's day of birth in the traditional eight-day calendar) to name their children. For instance, a Monday-born child may have a name beginning with the letter "k" (က). The following is a traditional chart that corresponds the day of birth with the first letter used in a child's name, although this naming scheme is not universally used today:

Day	Letters
Monday (တနင်္လာ)	က (ka), ခ (kha), ဂ (ga), ဃ (ga, gha), င (nga)
Tuesday (အင်္ဂါ)	စ (sa), ဆ (sa, has), ဇ (za), ဈ (za, zha), ည (nya)
Wednesday morning (ဗုဒ္ဓဟူး)	လ (la), ဝ (wa)
Wednesday afternoon (ရာဟု)	ယ (ya), ရ (ya, ra)
Thursday (ကြာသာပတေး)	ပ (pa), ဖ (hpa, pha), ဗ (ba), ဘ (ba, bha), မ (ma)
Friday (သောကြာ)	သ (tha), ဟ (ha)
Saturday (စနေ)	တ (ta), ထ (hta), ဒ (da), ဓ (da, dha), န (na)
Sunday (တနင်္ဂနွေ)	အ (a)
