= List of railway bridges and viaducts in Thailand =

This is a list of viaducts and significant bridges of Thailand's railways, past and present.

== 0–9 ==
- 100-metres Bridge, Prachuap Khiri Khan Province

== B ==
- Ban Mai Bridge, Nakhon Sawan Province
- Ban Phai Elevated Railway, Khon Kaen Province
- Bangkok Elevated Road and Train System viaduct (incompleted), Bangkok and Pathum Thani Province
- Bang Mun Nak Bridge, Phichit Province
- Bang Pakong River Railway bridge, Chachoengsao Province
- Bang Saphan River Railway bridge, Prachuap Khiri Khan Province
- Bridge near Prachantakham railway station, Prachinburi Province
- Bueng Boraphet Railway bridge, Nakhon Sawan Province
- BTS Skytrain viaduct, Bangkok
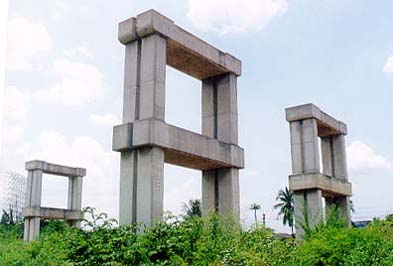
Bangkok Elevated Road and Train System viaduct between Bang Sue and Don Muang

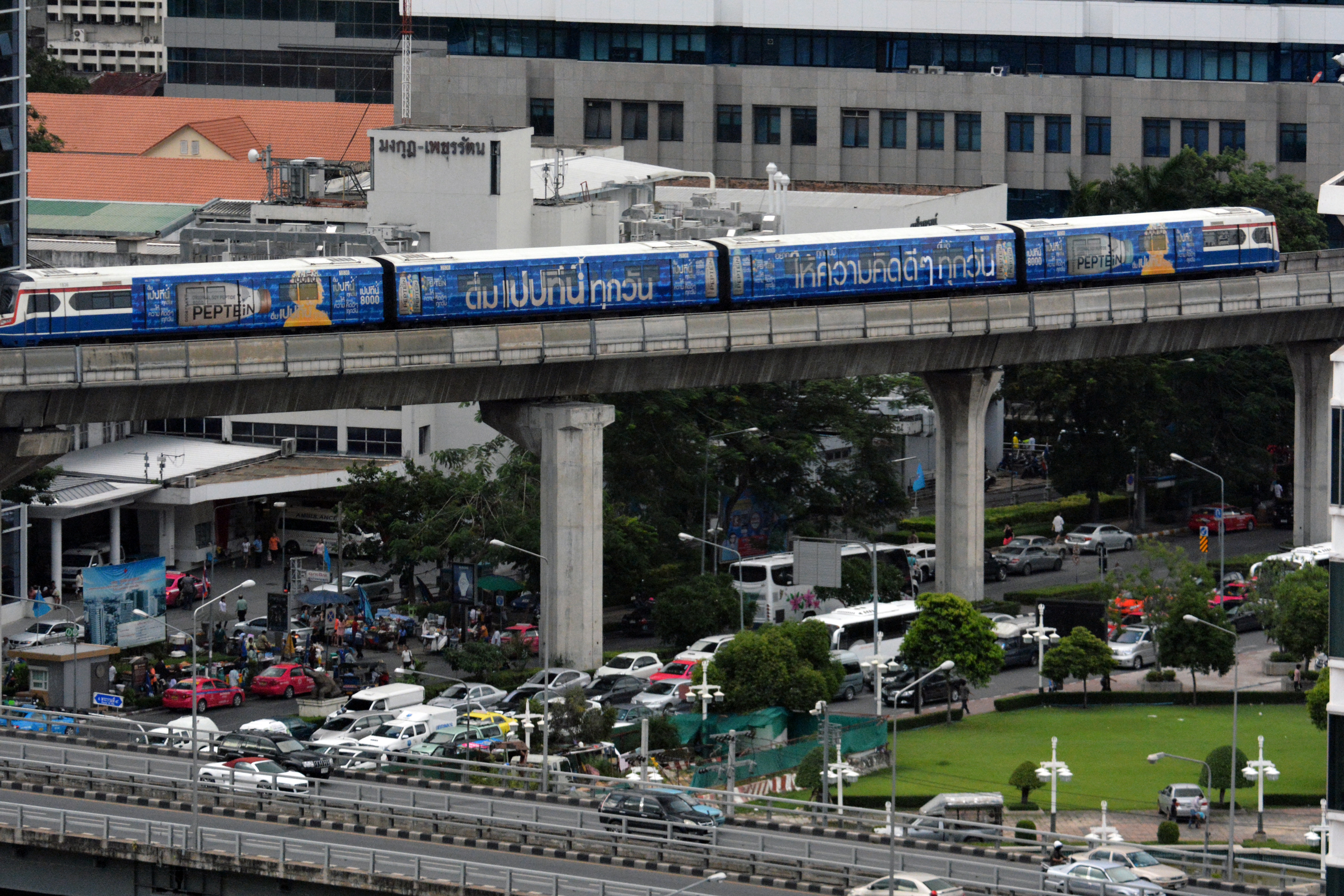
BTS Skytrain viaduct

== C ==
- Chakri Railway bridge, crossing Pa Sak River, Phra Nakhon Si Ayutthaya Province
- Chawang River Railway bridge, Nakhon Si Thammarat Province
- Chi River Railway bridge, Khon Kaen Province
- Chulachomklao bridge, or Ban Don Bridge, Tha Kham Bridge, Surat Thani Bridge, Surat Thani Province
- Chulalongkorn Railway bridge, crossing Mae Klong River, Ratchaburi Province
- Composite Bridge, using instead of Pang La Bridge, Lampang Province
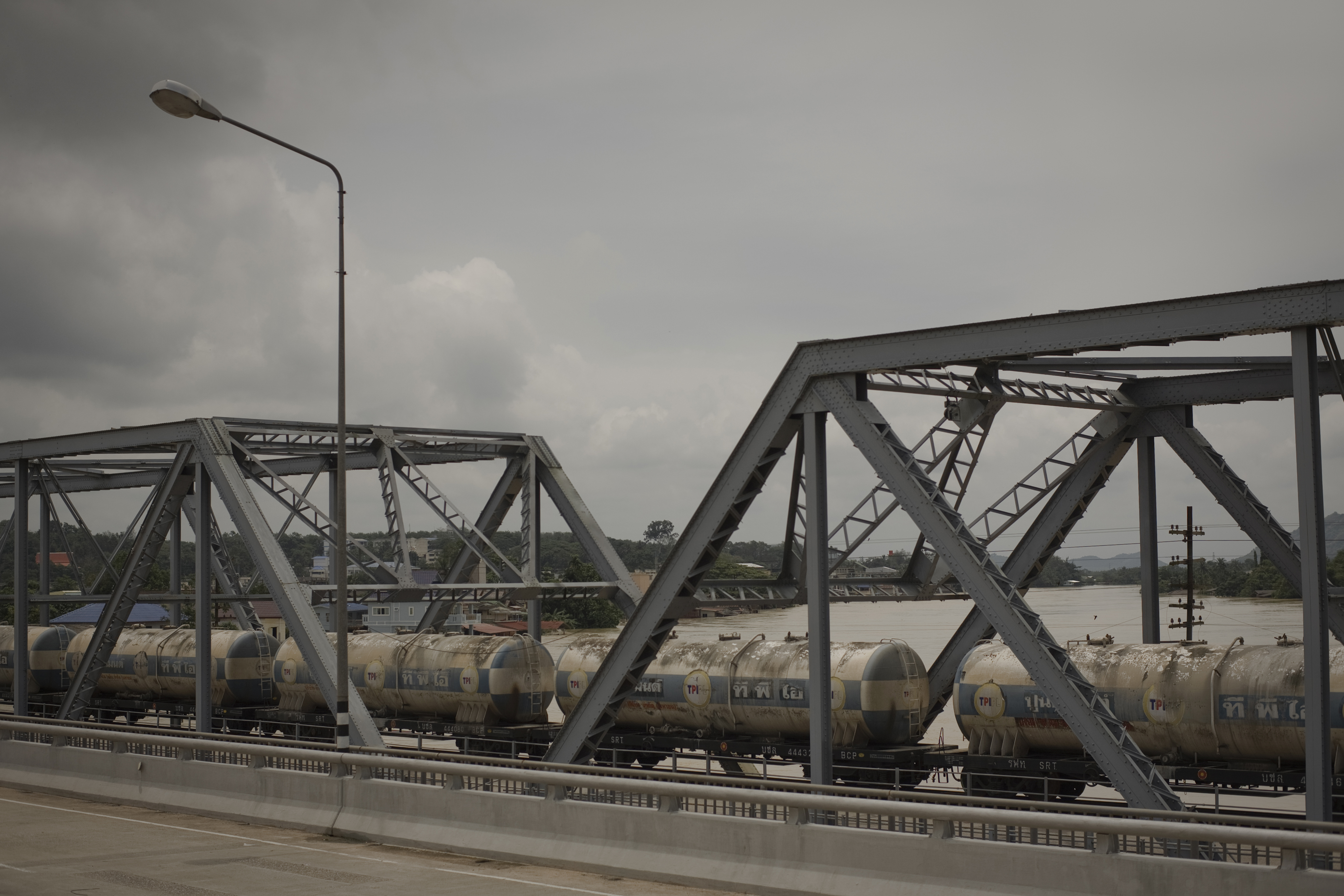
Chulachomklao bridge

== D ==
- Dong Ta Khob Bridge, Phichit Province

== G ==
- Guang River Railway bridge, Lamphun Province

== H ==
- Hanuman River Railway bridge, Prachinburi Province
- Hua Dong Bridge, Phichit Province
- Hua Hin Elevated Railway, Prachuap Khiri Khan Province (Under Construction)
- Huai Chorakhemak Railway bridge, Buriram Province
- Huai Kha Yung Railway bridge, Si Sa Ket Province
- Huai Mae Ta Bridge, crossing Yom River, Phrae Province
- Huai Samran Railway bridge, Si Sa Ket Province
- Huai Thap Than Railway bridge, Surin Province

== K ==
- Khlong Bangkok Noi Railway bridge, Bangkok
- Khlong Bang Khen Railway bridge, Bangkok
- Khlong Bang Prong Bridge, Nakhon Sawan Province
- Khlong Bang Ra Mat Bridge, Bangkok
- Khlong Bang Sue Railway bridge, Bangkok
- Khlong Chan Dee Bridge, Nakhon Si Thammarat Province
- Khlong Cholaprathan Anusatsananun Bridge, Nakhon Sawan Province
- Khlong Chorakhephuek Bridge, Nakhon Sawan Province
- Khlong Ka Mang Railway bridge, Phra Nakhon Si Ayutthaya Province
- Khlong Luek Bridge, near the Cambodia border, Sa Kaeo Province
- Khlong Pla Kot Bridge, Nakhon Sawan Province
- Khlong Rang Sit Railway bridge, Pathum Thani Province
- Khlong Sam Sen Railway bridge, Bangkok
- Khlong Tha Lo Bridge, Phichit Province
- Khlong Tha Luang Bridge, Phichit Province
- Khlong Yan Railway bridge, Surat Thani Province
- Khok Khlee Bridge, Lopburi Province
- Khon Kaen Elevated Railway, Khon Kaen Province
- Kwae Noi Railway bridge, Phitsanulok Province
- Kui Buri River Railway bridge, Prachuap Khiri Khan Province

== L ==
- Lam Chakkarat Railway bridge, Nakhon Ratchasima Province
- Lam Chi Railway bridge, Surin Province
- Lam Plai Mat Railway bridge, Buriram Province
- Lang Suan River Railway bridge, Chumphon Province
- Lopburi Bypass Elevated Railway, Lopburi Province (Under Construction)

== M ==
- Mae Thiap Bridge, Phitsanulok Province
- Maha Nak Railway bridge, Bangkok
- Huai Muak Lek Bridge, Saraburi Province
- Muak Lek Elevated Railway, Saraburi Province (Under Construction)

== N ==
- Nong Pling Bridge, Nakhon Sawan Province

== P ==
- Pak Pan Bridge, Phrae Province
- Pang La Bridge or Ha Ho Bridge, Lampang Province
- Pattani River Railway bridge, Yala Province
- Pa Sak Cholasit Dam Bridges, consist of 5 bridge spans, Saraburi and Lopburi Province
- Pa Sak River Railway bridge, Saraburi Province
- Pa Sak River Railway bridge, Lopburi Province
- Phra Prong Bridge, Prachinburi Province
- Phetchaburi River Railway bridge, Phetchaburi Province
- Phong River Railway bridge, Khon Kaen Province
- Poramin Bridge, or Ban Dara Bridge, Uttaradit Province
- Prachantakham River Bridge, Prachinburi Province
- Pranburi River Railway bridge, Prachuap Khiri Khan Province
- Phra Wiang Bridge, Surat Thani Province

== R ==
- Railway bridges near Bang Krathum railway station, Phitsanulok Province
- Rama VI Bridge, crossing Chao Phraya River, Bangkok, one of the longest truss bridge in Thailand.
- Rama I Canal Bridge, Songkhla Province
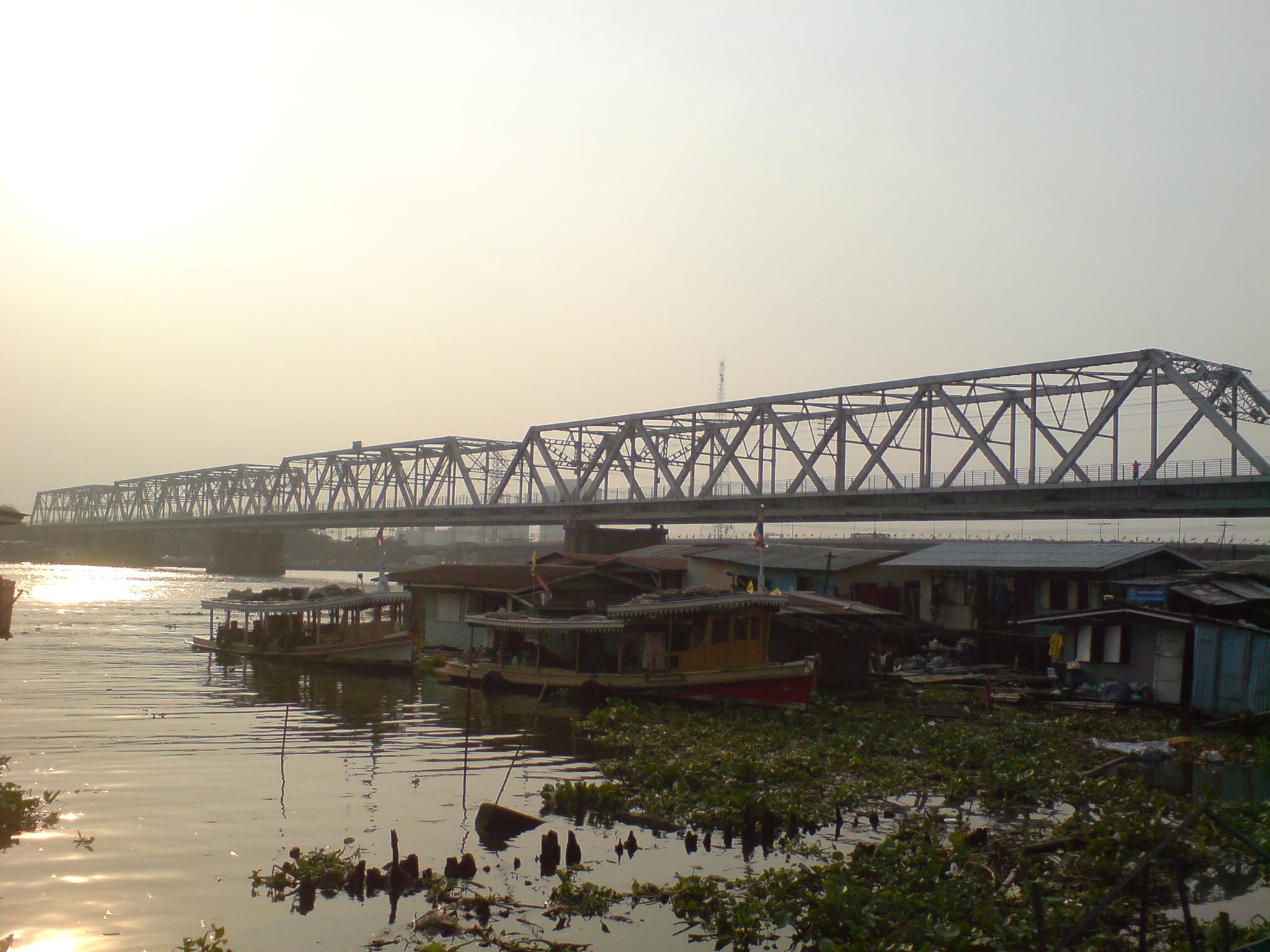
Rama VI Bridge, the most famous railway bridge in Thailand

== S ==
- Saowabha Bridge, crossing Tha Chin River, Nakhon Pathom Province
- Sai Buri River Railway bridge, Yala Province
- Sam Ho Bridge, Lampang Province
- Song Ho Bridge, Lampang Province
- Suvarnabhumi Airport Link viaduct, Bangkok and Samut Prakan Province
- Sri Surat Bridge, Surat Thani Province
- Sri Tapi Bridge, Surat Thani Province

== T ==
- First Thai–Lao Friendship Bridge, Nong Khai Province
- Tham Krasae Bridge, Kanchanaburi Province
- Tha Chang Bridge, crossing Mun River, Nakhon Ratchasima Province
- Tha Chom Phu Bridge, or White Bridge, Lamphun Province
- Tha Taphao River Railway bridge, Chumphon Province
- Thepha River Railway bridge, Songkhla Province
- The Bridge on the River Kwai, Kanchanaburi Province
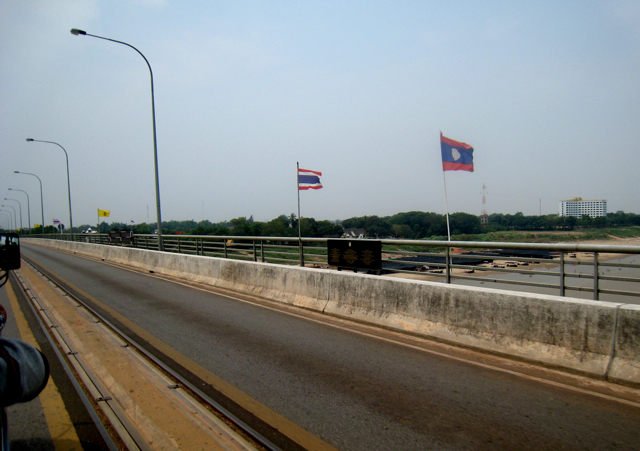
First Thai–Lao Friendship Bridge

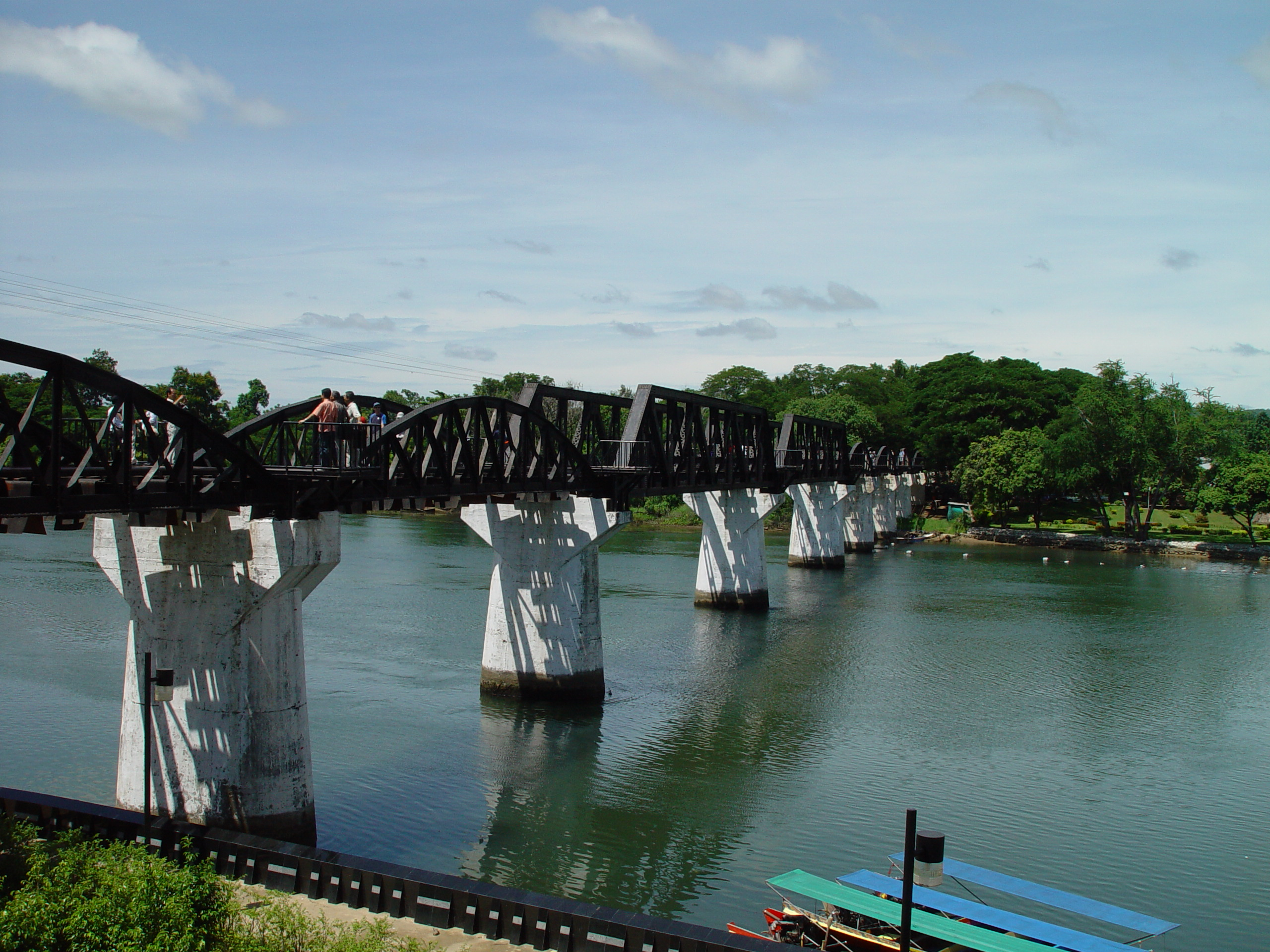
The Bridge on the River Kwai

== W ==
- Wang River Railway bridge, Lampang Province
- Watabaek Bridge, crossing Suranarai Road, Chaiyaphum Province
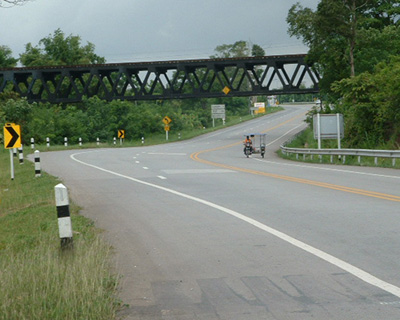
Watabaek Bridge of northeastern rail route crosses over Suranarai Road in Amphoe Thep Sathit, Chaiyaphum Province

== Y ==
- Yothaka Bridge, crossing Nakhon Nayok River, Chachoengsao Province

== See also ==
- List of railway tunnels in Thailand
- List of bridges in Thailand
