= Thai name =

Thai naming conventions and laws in Thailand

Thai names use the Western order of a given name followed by a family name. This is like Lao, but differs from the patterns of Cambodian which place the family name first.

Like Iranian and Turkish counterparts, Thai family names are a relatively recent introduction. They are required to be unique to a family; they are usually quite long as a result. Prior to the promulgation of the Surname Act of 1913 by King Vajiravudh (Rama VI), inhabitants of Siam did not have surnames, identifying themselves instead by their parents' given names or the place they resided.

Thais are formally referred to by given names and not by family names. While given names are used in formal settings and for recordkeeping, most Thais are also given a nickname at birth that is used in daily life. This nickname takes precedence over the given name in most other social situations, including school or the workplace.

== Surnames ==
Last names became legally required of Thai citizens in 1913 with the passing of the Surname Act 1913. Until then, most Thais used only a first or given name. The Person Name Act, BE 2505 (1962), mandates that new Thai surnames must be no longer than ten Thai letters, excluding vowel symbols and diacritics. The same law also forbids the creation of a surname that is a duplicate of any existing surnames; however, there are some duplicates dating to the time before computer databases were available to prevent this. Some creations incorporated the name of their location (muban, tambon, or amphoe) into their surnames, similar to family name suffixes.

The Surname Act 1913 also decreed that married women can either bear her husband's surname or keep her maiden name (in Clause 6). A woman's right to choose her surname ended in 1941 with the passage of the "Personal Name Act 1941". The law forced women to use their husband's surname after marriage (Clause 13). The Personal Name Act 1941 was revised in 1962. The 1962 law allowed a divorced woman to continue using her maiden surname (Clause 13 of the Personal Name Act 1962). A widow could keep her husband's surname or could revert to her maiden surname (Clause 14). The Personal Name Act 2002 gave a married woman the right to use her maiden name or assume her spouse's surname. She has to choose one or the other when the marriage is registered. A couple also has the right to use a different surname.

As a measure of the diversity of Thai names, in a sample of 45,665 names, 81% of family names were unique and 35% of given names were unique. The people with shared family names are related, and the diversity of given names is conventional.

=== Ethnic surnames ===
The surnames of most of the non-Chinese Thai population, such as the Siamese, Mon, Persian, Portuguese, Isan, Lanna, Northern Khmer, or Kuy often use simple words in their surname. Common origins for surnames include naming them after ancestors, professions, or places of residence. For example, the surname of footballer Siwarak Tedsungnoen comes from the name of Sung Noen District. People from Nakhon Ratchasima also have a large number of surnames that reflect the names or historical names of the districts and subdistricts from which their families originate. Examples include Chongprongklang and Klangsathon, which are associated with Non Sung District or Kham Sakaesaeng District, as the area was historically known as Amphoe Klang (Klang District). Other examples include Bosantia, Phuangsantia, and Kaengsantia, which are associated with Chok Chai District or Non Thai District; Phatkhunthot, Ketkhunthot, and Phopkhunthot, which are associated with Dan Khun Thot District; and Jongjohor, Koetjohor, and Kaewjohor, which are associated with Cho Ho Subdistrict, Mueang Nakhon Ratchasima District.

=== Chinese surnames ===
Surnames among Thais of Chinese descent are mostly derived from the Chinese surname and contain hints toward the original. For example, the family of former Prime Minister Thaksin Shinawatra, adopted the surname in 1938, where the first syllable of the surname, "Shin", is derived from the Chinese surname 丘, while the surname of former Prime Minister Banharn Silpa-archa contains "archa", meaning "horse", which translated to Sanskrit from original Chinese surname Bae (馬) in Chinese. However, this is not always the case, such as the family of former Prime Minister Srettha Thavisin, whose surname does not have any hint of his Chinese surname 高.

=== Malay surnames ===
Malay traditional culture does not include surnames. The majority of Thais of Malay descent surnames are in the same style as mainstream Thai, such as Madsiri or Pitsuwan. However, some Thai Malays also use Malay terms in their surnames such as Dolah, Lahsoh, Soleb, Sriyankem, Yousoh, etc.

=== Romanization of surnames ===
The romanization of Thai in some surnames, especially ones bestowed by the king, do not follow the standard Royal Thai General System of Transcription (RTGS), which follows Thai phonology, but instead follow the romanization of the original Pali or Sanskrit root. For example, in the surname Temeeyaves เตมียาเวส, the ว consonant corresponds to /w/ in Thai phonology, but the relevant Sanskrit root has /v/ there, leading to the transcription with v. This kind of romanization can also be seen in the name of monarchs. For example, the usual romanization for the current King's name is Vajiralongkorn, as opposed to Wachiralongkon.

The main purpose of Royal Thai General System of Transcription (RTGS) transcription is to transcribe Thai words in newspapers, official government publications, and road signs. The general Thai public hardly knows about this system, not to mention knows how to transcribe their names with it. Therefore, people come up with their own romanization of their names. It is very common to find two people with the same Thai names (given names or surnames) but spelling their names differently in the Latin alphabet.

== Given names ==
Thai names generally convey positive attributes, and some Thais change their names frequently, a practice virtually unknown in most countries outside of marriage. (Family names are changed less frequently, as it requires permission from senior members of the family.) Many times, changes are sought to get rid of bad luck; this practice lies in tradition, which holds that name changes confuse malicious ghosts and spirits of one's identity.

According to Denis Segaller, author of Thai Ways, there are at least "tens of thousands" of formal given names in Thailand, and that compared to any given country in the West "there are many times more first names". He also stated that people in Thailand were creating more given names on a daily basis. Such given names are usually gender-specific; according to Segaller, the number of truly gender-neutral names numbered "perhaps two or three hundred"; he characterised this number as being very small. Because family names are relatively new in Thai society, dating only to 1913, Thai people are primarily known by their given names. According to Segaller, some Thai who have been friends for long periods of time do not know their friends' family names, and "The first-name habit is so deeply ingrained in Thai society".

== Nicknames ==
Thais typically address one another by nicknames (Thai: ชื่อเล่น; RTGS: chue len), or auxiliary names, if they have them. The small minority of Thais who do not have a nickname may be addressed by shortened versions of their formal given names. Bestowed by relatives or playmates in early childhood, nicknames are commonly one syllable (or worn down from two to one). These may often be nonsense words or humorous and seldom relate to the registered name except in cases where it is a diminutive, such as Nok for Noknoi, or 'bird' from 'little bird'. They are freely used in everyday life. Some may have additional nicknames bestowed by friends or colleagues, especially during school or adolescence. Nicknames may link with a notable physical feature or behavior. In everyday life, a Thai is introduced by nickname and others may not know the person's formal name. When so introduced, one usually continues to use the nickname.

The evolution of Thai nicknames dates back to the Sukhothai era, when names were used to mark the order of children. Nicknames such as Ai, Yee, and Sam designated children as 'one', 'two', and 'three'. Later, in the Ayutthaya and Rattanakosin periods, children began to be named for physical attributes, such as Daeng ('red') or Uan ('fat') or for desirable items such as Thong ('gold'). Conversely, unflattering nicknames such as Mah ('dog'), Moo ('pig'), or Gop ('frog') were employed to keep malign spirits from coveting the child. King Mongkut (Rama IV) (1804–1868) stimulated interest in naming babies in accordance with astrological principles as outlined in the ancient scripture, Namtaksapakorn.

Some Thai Chinese have courtesy names which are used when interacting with Mainland Chinese and Taiwanese people only, like Dhanin and Suphachai Chearavanont known in Chinese as 'Kok Min' (國民) and 'Rong Ren' (榕仁).

During the time of Field Marshal Plaek Phibunsongkhram (1897–1964), gender-based naming was introduced. Names ending in "-sak", "-chai", and "-yot" were for male babies, "-porn" or "-sri" for females. In the 21st century, assigning nicknames still relies heavily on astrological beliefs, but also in keeping up with current naming fashions. Observers have noted such modern nicknames as "Porsche", "Mercedes", "Benz", "Man U", "Big Mac", "Internet", and "Google", among others.

King Bhumibol Adulyadej's nickname, for example, was Ong Lek (Thai: องค์เล็ก; Ong is a numerative noun for kings, princes, princesses, priests, images of Buddha, gods, angels, palaces, pagodas; lek means 'little (one)', a common name for younger siblings). Former Prime Minister Thaksin Shinawatra's nickname is Maeo (Thai: แม้ว), Thai for the Miao people. By way of example preceding formal naming, Plaek Pibulsongkram's childhood name 'Plaek' meant 'strange'. He later adopted as a surname what was originally an award for academic excellence and generally known in public life by the shortened form Pibun. Thailand's first female prime minister, Yingluck Shinawatra, is nicknamed Pu 'crab' (ปู; Thai pronunciation: [pūː]).

Many Thai given names are rooted in Sanskrit and Pali, though Thai names may also derive from other languages, including Thai, Chinese, Malay, and English.

== Forms of address ==
In the past, different words were used to address men and women. Nai (นาย) or Ay (อ้าย) were used before a man's given name. Am daeng (อําแดง) or Ii (อี) were used before a woman's given name. A man named Somchai was addressed as Nai Somchai or Ay Somchai. A woman whose name was Somsri was addressed as Am daeng Somsri or Ii Somsri. There was no law concerning this matter, it was purely a matter of custom.

In 1917, Rama VI declared a new law, the "Form of Address for Woman Act, 1917". The act mandated a new form of address, Nangsao (นางสาว) ('Miss') for women who were unmarried (the wording used in the act was "woman who has no husband") and Nang (นาง) ('Missus' [Mrs.]) for women who were married ('married woman or woman who has husband'). Once a woman married, she had to use the address Nang before her given name for the rest of her life even if she divorced or widowed. This form of address applied to commoners, not to women in royal or noble families.

In 1921, the king proclaimed the form of address for girls. He specified that "girl" meant a female under 15 years old; they were addressed as nangsao, as were females older than 15 years of age and unmarried (meaning 'married to a man').

The Form of Address for Women Act 2008 mandates that married or divorced women can choose to use either Nang or Nangsao before their given names. It gives a married woman the right to change all her documents (ID card, driver's license, bank account) to include the title Nangsao before her given name.

Today, in polite speech, Thais address each other by a given name, preceded by the courtesy title khun, particularly with persons of higher status or public distinction. Thai family names are only stated in conjunction with the given name, and people are not addressed solely by their family names. Thai media, print and spoken, after the first mention, address people by given names only unless two people with the same given name are in the same piece of media; in those cases, full names are used. English-language newspapers in Thailand follow the same rule. Directories index peoples' names by their given names. This means that the addressing form of title and surname is not present in Thailand.

== Royal and noble names ==
East Asian monarchs often adopted regnal names upon ascending the throne, which is still done in Thailand. In addition, subjects of a monarch may be awarded both a title and a name, such as in the case of Sing (or Singh) Sinhaseni (สิงห์ สิงหเสนี) who was awarded the title of Chao Phraya and the name of Bodindecha (Thai: เจ้าพระยาบดินทรเดชา).

Kings Rama I and Rama II were awarded noble titles and names before they assumed regnal names, which were then changed by subsequent kings. As neither noble titles nor names are necessarily unique, it is customary to list the highest title and awarded named first, followed by former names and titles (and personal and family names in parentheses) as needed.

== Indexing ==
According to the Chicago Manual of Style, Thai names may be indexed depending upon the individual practice. Often they may be alphabetized under the given name with no comma or inversion, but they may also be alphabetized under the surname with a comma and with an inversion.

== See also ==
- Rama (Kings of Thailand)
- Thai honorifics
