= Suranarai Road =

Road in Thailand

National Highway 205
- ทางหลวงแผ่นดินหมายเลข 205
- ถนนสุรนารายณ์ Thanon Suranarai

Route information
- Length: 231.085 km (143.590 mi)
- Existed: 1942–present

Major junctions
- From: Amphoe Ban Mi
- To: Tambon Nai Muaeng

Location
- Country: Thailand
- Major cities: Nakhon Ratchasima

Highway system
- Highways in Thailand; Motorways; Asian Highways

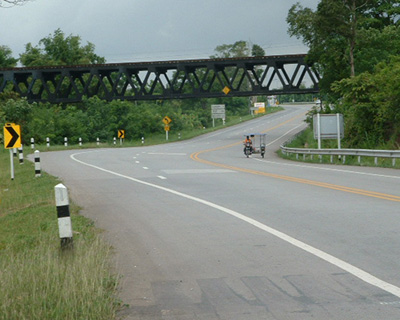
The railway bridge of northeastern rail route crosses over Suranarai Road in Amphoe Thep Sathit, Chaiyaphum Province

Suranarai Road (Thai: ถนนสุรนารายณ์, RTGS: Thanon Suranarai, pronounced [tʰā.nǒn sù.rā.nāː.rāːj]) or Highway 205 is a road connecting Lopburi Province with northeastern Thailand. The road begins at Ban Mi District, Lopburi Province and ends at Mueang Nakhon Ratchasima District, Nakhon Ratchasima Province. It is a strategic inter-regional road, linking the Lopburi military base in central Thailand to Nakhon Ratchasima. The road was built in 1943, during Prime Minister Field marshal Plaek Phibunsongkhram's tenure, but was not completed until 1951. Part of the road was built on abandoned railway track, with several railway bridges being converted into road bridges.

The districts and provinces along the road are Amphoe Khok Samrong, Amphoe Chai Badan, and Amphoe Lam Sonthi of Lopburi Province, Amphoe Thep Sathit and Amphoe Bamnet Narong of Chaiyaphum Province, and Amphoe Phra Thong Kham and Amphoe Non Thai of Nakhon Ratchasima Province.

The name originates from its role as a transportation link between Lopburi and Nakhon Ratchasima province, therefore, the sacred figures revered by both provinces, Thao Suranari and Narai ncluded in the name.
