= Kut Chik, Nakhon Ratchasima =

Coordinates: 14°54′13.3″N 101°53′13.2″E

Kut Chik (Thai: กุดจิก, pronounced [kùt t͡ɕìk]) is a tambon (subdistrict) of Sung Noen district, Nakhon Ratchasima province, northeastern Thailand.

== History ==
Historically, there were locals, immigrant Chinese, merchants who settled down at Kut Chik. It was an important economic zone of Nakhon Ratchasima and Sung Noen. The northeastern railway has passed here since the King Chulalongkorn (Rama V)'s era, the economic growth was prosperous. The old Chinese or locals had a trading here.

Kut Chik in the late 1980s and the early 1990s, market opened early in the morning to evening. The area behind Kut Chik railway station that were all farming zones and the rice mill was nearby. Farmers delivered their crops on the rail to Bangkok. The railway at that time was considered the most important transportation route because there is no Mittraphap Road (Highway 2), railway as a main lifeblood of local economic growth. People traveling to bring agricultural produce to sell either in Korat (Nakhon Ratchasima city) or Bangkok must travel through here.

During the Second World War, Chinese merchants in Korat moved here to seek refuge from the bomb. They came to stay Kut Chik from time to time and when it's time for important festivals many of them still come back to pay their respects. Kut Chik has many Chinese joss houses.

== Geography ==
Kut Chik is regarded as an area with fertility suitable for cultivation because there is a Lam Takhong river flowing through. So, Kut Chik have full of water and can farm rice throughout the year.

== Economy ==
Farming is the main occupation of the Kut Chik people. In the olden days, farmers can grow rice cultivation only in season. Now they can grow rice five times in two years. The rice cultivation goes well. When the economy grows, as a result, people have better living conditions and status. Parents can afford to send their children to school. New generation then had higher education and worked as government officials. That makes the area of Kut Chit have a large proportion of the population with government jobs and instructors.

In the past, it was economic town which based on farms, however, there are more factories in local presently. As a result, there are more workers with fewer farmers.

== Administration ==
Kut Chik is administered by two local governments, the Subdistrict Administrative Organization (SAO) Kut Chik (องค์การบริหารส่วนตำบลกุดจิก) and Municipality of Kut Chick (เทศบาลตำบลกุดจิก), they consisting of parts of subdistrict Kut Chik as well as some parts of neighbouring area Na Klang.

Kut Chik also consists of two muban (village).

== Local product ==
Kut Chik is the origin of Mi Korat, the unique rice noodle of Nakhon Ratchasima. These rice noodles are made from broken rice grown in Kut Chik. It is a long-standing occupation of more than 100 years, presumably influenced by the Chinese food of the immigrant Chinese. Every production process is made by hand and charcoal stove.

At present, there is only one household left of the rice noodle makers.

== Places ==
- Kut Chik railway station
- Saphan Dam (Black Bridge)
