= Wat Thammachak Semaram =

Buddhist temple in Nakhon Ratchasima province, Thailand

- วัดธรรมจักรเสมาราม
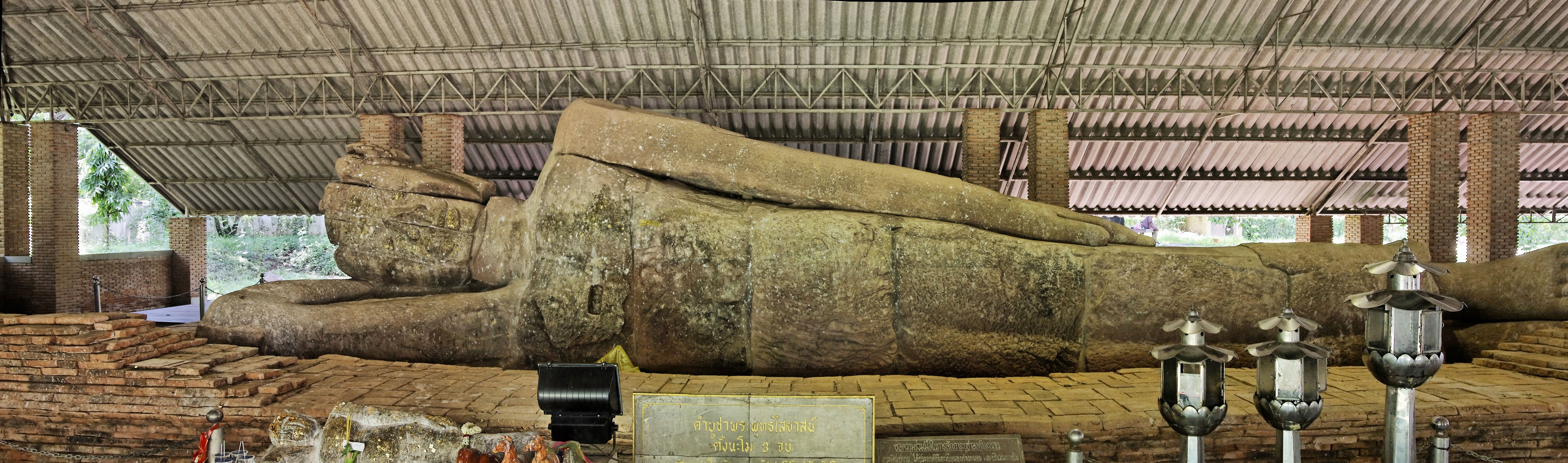
- Buddha statue, Dvaravati style, at Wat Thammachak Semaram

- Location in Thailand

Religion
- Affiliation: Buddhism
- Sect: Theravāda

Location
- Location: Ban Khlong Khwang, Sema subdistrict, Sung Noen district, Nakhon Ratchasima province, Thailand
- Interactive map of Wat Thammachak Semaram
- Coordinates: 14°55′00″N 101°47′37″E

Wat Thammachak Semaram (Thai: วัดธรรมจักรเสมาราม) is a Buddhist temple at Ban Khlong Khwang in Sema subdistrict, Sung Noen district, Nakhon Ratchasima province, northeastern Thailand. It stands about 500 m south-west of the ancient town of Mueang Sema and holds a large stone reclining Buddha and a sandstone dharmacakra, both recovered outside the walls of that town and both attributed to the Dvaravati period.

== Findings ==
=== Reclining Buddha ===
The image has been described as the largest stone reclining Buddha found in Thailand. It has been given as red sandstone, 13 m long and of the 8th century, in a northeastern Dvaravati style, and as the largest such image in the country. Its style has also been read as Dvaravati with local influence, and its date as the 13th Buddhist century, 658 to 757 CE.

The figure has been measured at up to 12 m, and read not as a reclining image but as a standing one that later fell.

=== Dharmacakra ===
The sandstone dharmacakra has been taken to be of about the same date as the reclining Buddha and as the town itself. The wheel of the Mueang Sema area is the most easterly yet recovered.
