= Dangda =

Dangda (Thai: แดงดา) is a Thai surname. Notable people with the surname include:

- Taneekarn Dangda (born 1992), Thai footballer
- Teerasil Dangda (born 1988), Thai footballer, brother of Taneekarn
