= Thepharak district =

Thepharak เทพารักษ์
- District
- District location in Nakhon Ratchasima province
- Coordinates: 15°18′34″N 101°33′2″E
- Country: Thailand
- Province: Nakhon Ratchasima
- Seat: Samnak Takhro
- District established: 1995

Area
  - Total: 357.5 km^{2} (138.0 sq mi)

Population (2000)
  - Total: 23,279
  - Density: 65.1/km^{2} (169/sq mi)
- Time zone: UTC+7 (ICT)
- Postal code: 30210
- Geocode: 3026

Thepharak (Thai: เทพารักษ์, pronounced [tʰēː.pʰāː.rák]; Northeastern Thai: เทพารักษ์, pronounced [tʰêː.pʰâː.làk]) is a district (amphoe) in the northwestern part of Nakhon Ratchasima province.

== History ==
Originally, Tambon Samnak Takhrau was part of Tambon Pan Chana, Dan Khun Thot district. On 1 April 1995, the Interior Ministry separated Tambons Samnak Takhrau, Nong Waeng, and Bueng Prue to create the new minor district (king amphoe) Samnak Takhrau.

Luang Phau Khun, a monk of Wat Ban Rai, proposed changing the district's name to "Theparak". As the minor district was near the districts of Thep Sathit and Si Thep and both districts contain the word "thep" ('angel') (Deva), the district is thus protected by angels. The government adopted this suggestion and renamed the district Theparak.

On 15 May 2007, all 81 minor districts were upgraded to full districts. With publication in the Royal Gazette on 24 August, the upgrade became official.

== Geography ==
Neighboring districts are (from the north clockwise) Thep Sathit and Bamnet Narong of Chaiyaphum province, Dan Khun Thot of Nakhon Ratchasima Province, and Lam Sonthi of Lopburi province.

== Administration ==
The district is divided into four sub-districts (tambons), which are further subdivided into 58 villages (mubans). There are no municipal (thesaban) areas. There are four tambon administrative organizations (TAO).

1.	Samnak Takhro	สำนักตะคร้อ
2.	Nong Waeng	หนองแวง
3.	Bueng Prue	บึงปรือ
4.	Wang Yai Thong	วังยายทอง
