= Kham Thale So district =

Kham Thale So ขามทะเลสอ
- District
- District location in Nakhon Ratchasima province
- Coordinates: 14°57′39″N 101°56′51″E
- Country: Thailand
- Province: Nakhon Ratchasima
- Seat: Kham Thale So

Area
  - Total: 203.6 km^{2} (78.6 sq mi)

Population (2000)
  - Total: 28,306
  - Density: 139/km^{2} (360/sq mi)
- Time zone: UTC+7 (ICT)
- Postal code: 30280
- Geocode: 3019

Kham Thale So (Thai: ขามทะเลสอ, pronounced [kʰǎːm tʰā.lēː sɔ̌ː]; Northeastern Thai: ขามทะเลสอ, pronounced [kʰǎːm tʰā.lêː sɔ̌ː]) is a district (amphoe) of Nakhon Ratchasima province, northeastern Thailand.

== History ==
The government separated some parts of Non Thai and Sung Noen districts and created the minor district (king amphoe) Kham Thale So in 1958, which was upgraded to a full district in 1965.

== Geography ==
Neighbouring districts are (from the north clockwise) Non Thai, Mueang Nakhon Ratchasima, Sung Noen, and Dan Khun Thot.

== Administration ==
The district is divided into five sub-districts (tambons). Kham Thale So is also a township (thesaban tambon) which covers parts of the tambon Kham Thale So.

1.	Kham Thale So	ขามทะเลสอ
2.	Pong Daeng	โป่งแดง
3.	Phan Dung	พันดุง
4.	Nong Suang	หนองสรวง
5.	Bueng O	บึงอ้อ

== Economy ==
The district is the site of salt mines operated by the Saltworks Company, a major producer of salt for the chemical and food industries.
