= Nai Shwe Kyin =

Burmese activist (1908–2003)

Shwe Kyin

Leader and 1st President of NMSP, New Mon State Party
- In office second half of 1948 – March 2003
- Preceded by: None
- Succeeded by: Nai Htin

Personal details
- Born: 1 March 1908 Pa-an Township, British Burma
- Died: 7 March 2003 (aged 90) Mawlamyine, Mon State, Myanmar
- Spouse: Mi Tin
- Education: Rangoon University

Nai Shwe Kyin (1 March 1913 – 7 March 2003) was a Burmese civil rights revolutionary during the country's transition from British colonial rule and through the ensuing civil war between the insurgent ruling Burmese and the Mon minority.

As a youth activist at the Rangoon University, Shwe Kyin founded the civil rights group "Mon Freedom League" and was jailed when civil war broke out on the eve of Burmese independence in 1948.

Upon his release two years later, Shwe Kyin joined in the armed revolutionary group known as the Mon People Front (MPF).

In 1958, the MPF surrendered their arms in a pact with the Burmese ruling class to participate in elections as a legal political party. In defiance, Shwe Kyin refused to disarm and founded the New Mon State Party to continue an armed struggle. This group gained favor among young Mon students and eventually replaced the MPF as the primary Mon armed resistance.

In 1990, he became the President of National Democratic Front (NDF), an umbrella political organization of ethnic nationalities.

In 1995, the New Mon State Party agreed to ceasefire with the current regime. Nai Shwe Kyin died in 2003.
