= Nong Pling Bridge =

Nong Pling Bridge สะพานหนองปลิง
- Coordinates: 15°41′49″N 100°09′00″E
- Carries: 1 Railway track
- Crosses: Unnamed canal
- Locale: Nakhon Sawan Province
- Official name: Nong Pling Bridge
- Maintained by: State Railway of Thailand

Characteristics
- Design: Truss bridge
- Total length: about 40.00 metres

History
- Constructed by: NEUNG HWA INDUSTRY CO., LTD.
- Opened: 1976

Nong Pling Bridge is a one-span railway bridge in Thailand. It is in Nakhon Sawan Province on the Northern Line Railway, near Nakhon Sawan Railway Station. There is only one span, with a length of about 40 metres.

== Features ==
It is a one-span truss bridge.
