= Dan Khun Thot district =

Dan Khun Thot ด่านขุนทด
- District
- District location in Nakhon Ratchasima province
- Coordinates: 15°12′35″N 101°45′57″E
- Country: Thailand
- Province: Nakhon Ratchasima
- Seat: Dan Khun Thot

Area
  - Total: 1,428.1 km^{2} (551.4 sq mi)

Population (2000)
  - Total: 126,253
  - Density: 88.4/km^{2} (229/sq mi)
- Time zone: UTC+7 (ICT)
- Postal code: 30210, 36220
- Geocode: 3008

Dan Khun Thot (Thai: ด่านขุนทด, pronounced [dàːn kʰǔn tʰót]; Northeastern Thai: ด่านขุนทด, pronounced [dáːn kʰǔn tʰòt]) is a district (amphoe) in the western part of Nakhon Ratchasima province, Thailand.

== History ==
The town Dan Khun Thot was built before the reign of King Taksin. It became a district in 1908. At the same time, the centre of the town was moved from Wat Pho Chumphon to the west side of Ban Han School. The district was thus renamed Ban Han. Later it was named Phan Chana, until it was again renamed Dan Khun Thot in 1914.

== Geography ==
Neighbouring districts are (from the north clockwise): Bamnet Narong and Chatturat of Chaiyaphum province; Phra Thong Kham, Non Thai, Kham Thale So, Sung Noen, and Sikhio of Nakhon Ratchasima; Lam Sonthi of Lopburi province; and Thepharak of Nakhon Ratchasima.

== Administration ==
The district is divided into 16 sub-districts (tambons). There are three townships (thesaban tambons) within the district: Dan Khun Thot covers parts of tambon Dan Khun Thot, Nong Krat covers parts of tambon Nong Krat, and Nong Bua Takiat covers tambon Nong Bua Takiat.

No.	Name	Thai name
1.	Kut Phiman	กุดพิมาน
2.	Dan Khun Thot	ด่านขุนทด
3.	Dan Nok	ด่านนอก
4.	Dan Nai	ด่านใน
5.	Takhian	ตะเคียน
6.	Ban Kao	บ้านเก่า
7.	Ban Praeng	บ้านแปรง
8.	Phan Chana	พันชนะ
9.	Sa Chorakhe	สระจรเข้
10.	Nong Krat	หนองกราด
11.	Nong Bua Takiat	หนองบัวตะเกียด
12.	Nong Bua Lakhon	หนองบัวละคร
13.	Hin Dat	หินดาด
14.	Huai Bong	ห้วยบง
15.	Non Muaeng Patthana	โนนเมืองพัฒนา
16.	Nong Sai	หนองไทร
