= Bamnet Narong district =

Bamnet Narong บำเหน็จณรงค์
- District
- District location in Chaiyaphum province
- Coordinates: 15°30′1″N 101°41′11″E
- Country: Thailand
- Province: Chaiyaphum
- Seat: Ban Chuan

Area
  - Total: 560.3 km^{2} (216.3 sq mi)

Population (2000)
  - Total: 54,750
  - Density: 97.7/km^{2} (253/sq mi)
- Time zone: UTC+7 (ICT)
- Postal code: 36160
- Geocode: 3607

Bamnet Narong (Thai: บำเหน็จณรงค์, pronounced [bām.nèt nā.rōŋ]; Northeastern Thai: บำเหน็จณรงค์, pronounced [bàm.nȅt nā.lôŋ]) is a district (amphoe) in the southwestern part of Chaiyaphum province, northeastern Thailand.

== History ==
In the reign of King Rama II of Rattanakosin, the area of Bamnet Narong was a frontier town called Dan Chuan (ด่านชวน). As the town was in a strategic location, King Nangklao (Rama III) ordered a soldier from Mueang Khukhan to be the head of the town. In 1826, King Anouvong of Lan Xang moved his troops to Siam. At Nakhon Ratchasima, the headman of Dan Chuan led his soldiers to battle against the Laotian troop. Because of his courage, King Rama III promoted the leader of Dan Chuan to be Phra Ritthi Rue Chai (พระฤทธิฤาชัย) and upgraded Dan Chuan to be Mueang Bamnet Narong, under Mueang Nakhon Ratchasima.

In 1897 King Chulalongkorn downgraded Bamnet Narong to be a district of Chaiyaphum Province. It was downgraded to be Tambon Ban Chuan of Chatturat district in 1903. Later it was upgraded to be Bamnet Narong minor district (king amphoe) in 1905. It was renamed Ban Chuan after the central tambon, and back to the original name in 1939. It became a full district on 24 June 1956.

== Geography ==
Neighboring districts are (from the west clockwise): Thep Sathit, Sap Yai, and Chatturat of Chaiyaphum Province; Dan Khun Thot and Thepharak of Nakhon Ratchasima province.

== Administration ==
The district is divided into seven sub-districts (tambons), which are further subdivided into 88 villages (mubans). There are two townships (thesaban tambons) in the district: Bamnet Narong covers parts of tambons Ban Chuan, Ban Phet Phu Khiao, and parts of tambon Ban Phet. There are a further seven tambon administrative organizations (TAO).

1.	Ban Chuan	บ้านชวน
2.	Ban Phet	บ้านเพชร
3.	Ban Tan	บ้านตาล
4.	Hua Thale	หัวทะเล
5.	Khok Roeng Rom	โคกเริงรมย์
6.	Ko Manao	เกาะมะนาว
7.	Khok Phet Phatthana	โคกเพชรพัฒนา

== Economy ==
Bamnet Narong is site of a potash mine. The Electricity Generating Authority of Thailand (EGAT) plans to build a coal-fired power plant to power the mine. Those plans have encountered opposition from anti-coal activists.
