= Chulachomklao Bridge =

Chulachomklao bridge สะพานจุลจอมเกล้า
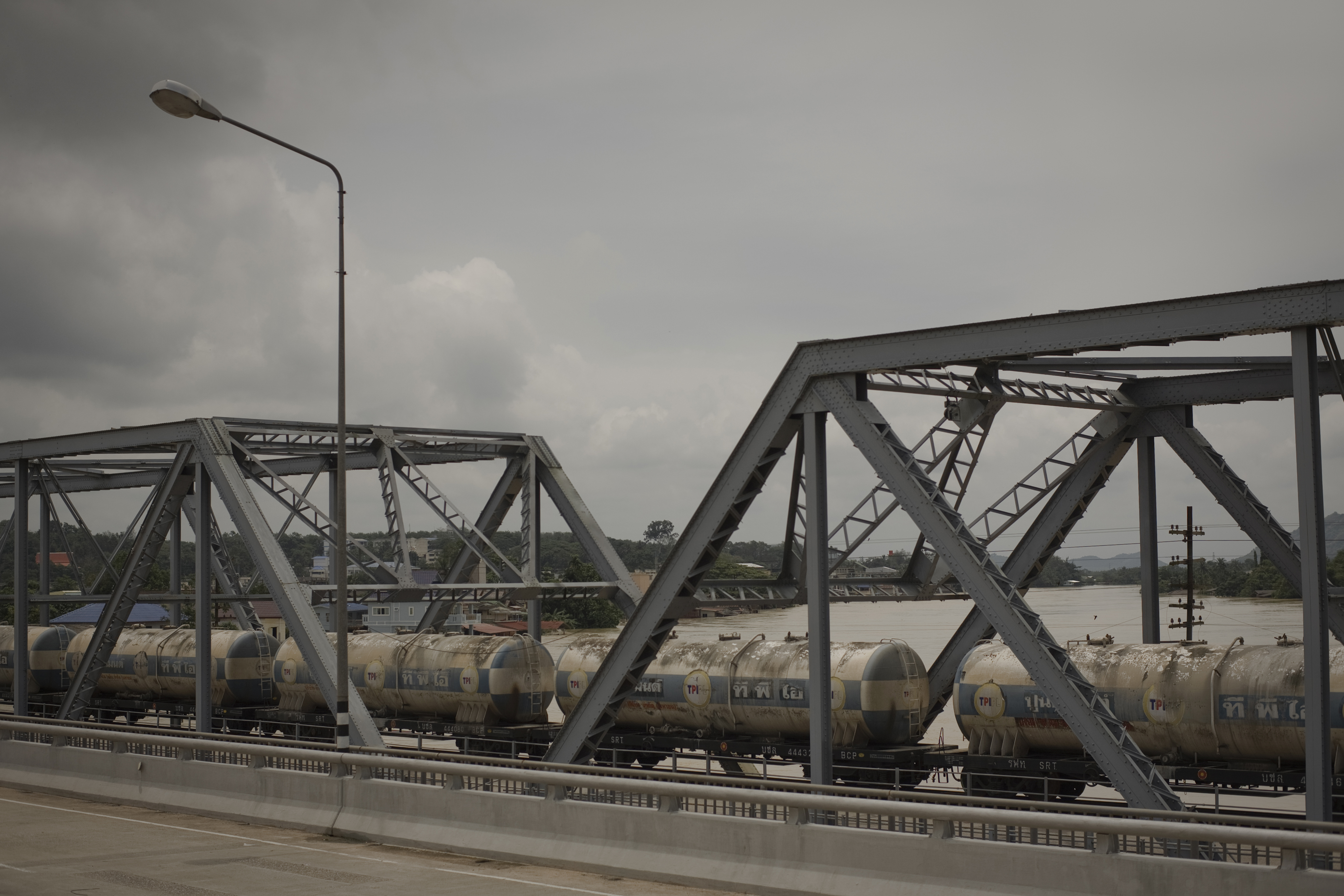
- View from road bridge
- Coordinates: 9°06′46″N 99°13′25″E
- Carries: Railway track, pedestrians and disused road
- Crosses: Tapi River
- Locale: Surat Thani, southern Thailand
- Official name: Chulachomklao bridge

Characteristics
- Design: 3-span through-truss

History
- Opened: 1916

Location
- Interactive map of Chulachomklao bridge

Chulachomklao bridge (Thai: สะพานจุลจอมเกล้า) is a railway bridge over the Tapi River in Tambon Tha Kham, Amphoe Phunphin, Surat Thani Province in southern Thailand. It was officially opened in 1916. The bridge was severely damaged during World War II, was repaired 1952-1953 and officially reopened in 1953.

The bridge is located 1.3 km from Surat Thani Railway Station. The bridge has 3 spans, all of through-truss design.

== Location ==
The Chulachomklao bridge is live Surat Thani, Thailand.
