= Mya Aye =

Mya Aye is a common Burmese name, and may refer to:

- Mya Aye (activist) (born 1966), Burmese activist, one of the leaders of the 8888 generation pro-democracy student activists
- Mya Aye (minister) (1942–2013), Burmese educator and government minister
- Mya Aye (golfer), (born 1940), Burmese professional golfer
