= Na Klang, Nakhon Ratchasima =

Coordinates: 14°53′31″N 101°54′49″E

Na Klang นากลาง
- Tambon
- Interactive map of Na Klang
- Country: Thailand
- Province: Nakhon Ratchasima
- Amphoe: Sung Noen

Population (2017)
  - Total: 6,880
- Time zone: UTC+7 (TST)
- Postal code: 30380
- TIS 1099: 301809

Na Klang (Thai: นากลาง, pronounced [nāː klāːŋ]) is a tambon (subdistrict) of Sung Noen District, in Nakhon Ratchasima Province, Thailand. In 2017 it had a total population of 6,880 people.

== Administration ==
=== Central administration ===
The tambon is subdivided into 9 administrative villages (muban).

| No. | Name | Thai |
|---|---|---|
| 1. | Ban Na Klang | บ้านนากลาง |
| 2. | Ban Na Yai | บ้านนาใหญ่ |
| 3. | Ban Huai Takhro | บ้านห้วยตะคร้อ |
| 4. | Ban Nong Bon | บ้านหนองบอน |
| 5. | Ban Na Klang | บ้านนากลาง |
| 6. | Ban Na Yai Phatthana | บ้านนาใหญ่พัฒนา |
| 7. | Ban Bu Ta Tong | บ้านบุตาต้อง |
| 8. | Ban Na Klang | บ้านนากลาง |
| 9. | Ban Na Klang Phatthana | บ้านนากลางพัฒนา |

=== Local administration ===
The area of the subdistrict is shared by 2 local governments.

- the subdistrict municipality (Thesaban Tambon) Kut Chik (เทศบาลตำบลกุดจิก)
- the subdistrict administrative organization (SAO) Na Klang (องค์การบริหารส่วนตำบลนากลาง)
