= Phra Thong Kham district =

Phra Thong Kham พระทองคำ
- District
- District location in Nakhon Ratchasima province
- Coordinates: 15°18′24″N 101°58′54″E
- Country: Thailand
- Province: Nakhon Ratchasima
- Seat: Sa Phra

Area
  - Total: 359.5 km^{2} (138.8 sq mi)

Population (2000)
  - Total: 44,232
  - Density: 123/km^{2} (320/sq mi)
- Time zone: UTC+7 (ICT)
- Postal code: 30220
- Geocode: 3028

Phra Thong Kham (Thai: พระทองคำ, pronounced [pʰráʔ tʰɔ̄ːŋ kʰām]; Northeastern Thai: พระทองคำ, pronounced [pʰàʔ tʰɔ̂ːŋ kʰâm]) is a district (amphoe) in the northern part of Nakhon Ratchasima province, northeastern Thailand.

== History ==
Tambon Sa Phra, Thap Rang, Phang Thiam, Nong Hoi and Map Krat were separated from Non Thai district to create the Phra Thong Kham minor district on 15 July 1996.

On 15 May 2007, all 81 minor districts were upgraded to full districts. On 24 August the upgrade became official.

== Etymology ==
Phra Thong Kham in Thai language means 'Golden Lord Buddha image'. The name Phra Thong Kham has two origins: the center of the minor district was in Ban Pa Kham, Tambon Sa Phra. The people selected the last words from the location name and add Thong as a middle word for good meaning; Phraya Palat Thong Kham was the husband of Thao Suranaree, the heroine of Nakhon Ratchasima.

== Geography ==
Neighbouring districts are (from the north clockwise): Chatturat and Noen Sa-nga of Chaiyaphum province; Khong, Kham Sakaesaeng, Non Thai, and Dan Khun Thot of Nakhon Ratchasima Province.

== Administration ==
The district is divided into five subdistricts (tambons). The township (thesaban tambon) Phra Thong Kham covers parts of the tambon Sa Phra.

1.	Sa Phra	สระพระ
2.	Map Krat	มาบกราด
3.	Phang Thiam	พังเทียม
4.	Thap Rang	ทัพรั้ง
5.	Nong Hoi	หนองหอย
