= Lao name =

Lao names (Lao: ຊື່ [sɯː]), like Thai ones, are given in Western order, where the family name goes after the first given name. On official documents, both first given name and surname are written, but it is customary to refer to people in formal situations by their first name, plus titles and honorifics, alone.

In daily life, outside of formal, international, or academic spheres, Lao people generally refer to themselves and others by nicknames, or seu lin—literally "playnames" (Lao: ຊື່ຫຼິ້ນ [sɯː lin]). Much like the nicknames of Thai people (with whom the Lao share a great deal of cultural similarity), the names are often unflattering, although some are based on onomatopoeia, nonsense syllables, or peculiar characteristics. This is largely based on old superstitions from times when health care was not available and there was high infant mortality, as many of these names were supposed to ward off evil spirits from claiming the child.

The French Colonial government mandated the introduction of surnames in Laos in 1943, beginning first with the royalty and the elite before becoming a common practice among the other classes. To this day, among isolated ethnic groups and remote rural villages, it is still possible to find individuals who do not possess a surname.

Both first and surname are a mixture of Pali or Sanskrit and Lao words. The wording comes from variety of influences, such as nature, animals, and royal titles. Lao names are generally made up of two or three words, but when translated into English span nearly 10–15 letters, for which both Lao and Thai names are known.

== Common name components ==
Name Component	Modern Spelling	Archaic Spelling	Origin and Meaning
Boun	ບຸນ [bun˩(˧)]	N/A	Pali puñña, “happiness,” “prosperity,” "goodness,” “virtue”.
Vong(sa) [wóŋ], Phong(sa) [pʰóŋ]	ວົງ, ພົງ	ວົງສ໌, ພົງສ໌	Sanskrit vamsha, "royal lineage" or "family", hence this component is a staple in many Lao surnames.
Singh or Syha	ສິງ [sǐŋ], ສິຫະ [sǐː háʔ]	ສິງຫ໌, N/A	Sanskrit siṃha, "Leo" or "lion".
Chan, Chanh, Chantha [càn]	ຈັນ	ຈັນທ໌, ຈັນທຣ໌	Sanskrit chandra, "moon", not to be confused with the tiane in Vientiane which means "sandalwood".
Dao	ດາວ	N/A	Lao, "star."
Dara [daː ráː], [daː láː]	ດາລາ	ດາຣາ	Sanskrit tara, "Evening Star".
Pha [pʰāʔ], Phra [pʰrāʔ]	ພະ	ພຣະ	Lao, usually imparts royal or religious significance to the following component.
Kham	ຄຳ [kʰám]	N/A	Lao, "golden" or "precious."
Mali	ມະລິ [ma-li]	ມາລີ	Lao/Thai, "Jasmine" (Thai: มะลิ) or "blossom".
Ngeun, Ngoen	ເງິນ [ŋɤn˧˥]	N/A	Lao, "money" or "silver."
Racha, Rasa [ráː sáː], [láː sáː]	ລາຊາ, ລາດ	ຣາຊາ, ຣາຊ	Sanskrit raja, "king".
Savane, Savan, Savanh [sáʔ wǎn]	ສະຫວັນ	ສວັຣ, ສວັຣຄ໌	Sanskrit swarga, or "heaven".
Seng, Saeng	ແສງ [sǣng]	N/A	Lao, "light".
Phou, Phu [pʰúː]	ພູ	N/A	Lao, "mountain".
Sri, Si [sǐː]	ສີ	ສີ, ສຣີ	Sanskrit sri, or "splendid".
Keo, Kaew, Kèw [kɛ̂ːw]	ແກ້ວ	N/A	Lao, "glass", "precious", "gem".
Vora, Worra [vɔː rāʔ]	ວໍລະ	ວໍຣະ	Sanskrit varaha, "excellent", "superb".
Chai, Sai, Xai, Xay [sái]	ໄຊ	ໄຊຍ໌, ຊັຍ	Sanskrit jaya, "victory".
Tong, Thong	ທອງ [tʰɔːŋ˧˥]	N/A	Lao, "golden" or "copper."

== List of Lao Surnames ==
Surname	Population	Components
Inthavong	ອິນທະວົງ	ອິນທະ,'Intha' - Indra ວົງ, 'Vong' - Family, Lineage
Chanthavong	ຈັນທະວົງ	ຈັນທະ, 'Chantha' - Moon ວົງ, 'Vong' - Family, Lineage
Thammavong	ທັມມະວົງ	ທັມມະ, 'Thamma' - Dharma ວົງ, 'Vong' - Family, Lineage
Noy		
Manivong	ມະນີວົງ	ມະນີ, 'Mani' - Jewel, Gem ວົງ, 'Vong' - Family, Lineage
Phanthavong	ພັນທະວົງ	ພັນທະ, 'Phantha' - Connect, Join, Tie ວົງ, 'Vong' - Family, Lineage
Lao		
Kham	ຄຳ	ຄຳ, 'Kham' - Gold
Keo	ແກ້ວ	ແກ້ວ, 'Keo' - Glass
Phommachanh	ພົມມະຈັນ	ພົມມະ, 'Phomma' - Brahma ຈັນ, 'Chanh' - Moon
Sayavong	ໄຊຍະວົງ	ໄຊຍະ, 'Saya' - Victory ວົງ, 'Vong' - Family, Lineage
Vongphachanh	ວົງພະຈັນ	ວົງ, 'Vong' - Family, Lineage ພະ, 'Pha' - Holy, Royal ຈັນ, 'Chanh' - Moon
Xayavong	ໄຊຍະວົງ	ໄຊຍະ, 'Xaya' - Victory ວົງ, 'Vong' - Family, Lineage
Phommavong	ພົມມະວົງ	ພົມມະ, 'Phomma' - Brahma ວົງ, 'Vong' - Family, Lineage
Chanthalangsy	ຈັນທະລັງສີ	ຈັນທະ, 'Chantha' - Moon ລັງສີ, 'langsi' - Ray, Beam
Keomany	ແກ້ວມະນີ	ແກ້ວ, 'Keo' - Glass ມະນີ, 'Mani' - Jewel, Gem
Phimmasone	ພິມມະສອນ	ພິມ, 'Phim' - Law, Custom, Form ສອນ, 'Sone' - Arrow, Weapon
Seng		
Vongxay	ວົງໄຊ	ວົງ, 'Vong' - Family, Lineage ໄຊ, 'Xay' - Victory

== See also ==
- Indian honorifics
- Indosphere
- Greater India
