= Kham Sakaesaeng district =

Kham Sakaesaeng ขามสะแกแสง
- District
- District location in Nakhon Ratchasima province
- Coordinates: 15°19′46″N 102°10′15″E
- Country: Thailand
- Province: Nakhon Ratchasima
- Seat: Kham Sakaesaeng

Area
  - Total: 298.0 km^{2} (115.1 sq mi)

Population (2000)
  - Total: 43,365
  - Density: 145.5/km^{2} (377/sq mi)
- Time zone: UTC+7 (ICT)
- Postal code: 30290
- Geocode: 3011

Kham Sakaesaeng (Thai: ขามสะแกแสง, pronounced [kʰǎːm sā.kɛ̄ː.sɛ̌ːŋ]; Northeastern Thai: ขามสะแกแสง, pronounced [kʰǎːm sā.kɛ̀ː.sɛ̌ːŋ]) is a district (amphoe) in the northern part of Nakhon Ratchasima province, northeastern Thailand.

== History ==
The government separated the two tambons Kham Sakaesaeng and Mueang Nat from Non Sung district and created the minor district (king amphoe) Kham Sakaesaeng on 25 November 1968. It was upgraded to a full district on 28 June 1973.

== Geography ==
Neighbouring districts are (from the north clockwise): Khong, Non Sung, Non Thai, and Phra Thong Kham.

== Administration ==
The district is divided into seven sub-districts (tambons). There two townships (thesaban tambons) within the district: Kham Sakae Saeng covers part of tambon Kham Sakae Saeng and Nong Hua Fan covers parts of tambons Nong Hua Fan and Mueang Nat.

1.	Kham Sakaesaeng	ขามสะแกแสง
2.	Non Mueang	โนนเมือง
3.	Mueang Nat	เมืองนาท
4.	Chiwuek	ชีวึก
5.	Pha-ngat	พะงาด
6.	Nong Hua Fan	หนองหัวฟาน
7.	Mueang Kaset	เมืองเกษตร
