= Mueang Nakhon Ratchasima district =

Mueang Nakhon Ratchasima อำเภอเมืองนครราชสีมา
- District
- District location in Nakhon Ratchasima province
- Coordinates: 14°58′16″N 102°5′59″E
- Country: Thailand
- Province: Nakhon Ratchasima
- Subdistricts: 25
- Mubans: 243
- Established: 1895

Government
  - Type: Local Administration: 10 municipalities, 17 SAO.
  - District Chief Officer: Samarn Wongvanayuth

Area
  - Total: 755.6 km^{2} (291.7 sq mi)

Population (2009)
  - Total: 454,647
  - Density: 601/km^{2} (1,560/sq mi)
- Time zone: UTC+7 (ICT)
- Postal code: 30000, 30280, 30310
- Geocode: 3001

Mueang Nakhon Ratchasima (Thai: เมืองนครราชสีมา, pronounced [mɯ̄aŋ ná(ʔ).kʰɔ̄ːn râːt.tɕʰā.sǐː.māː]; Northeastern Thai: เมืองนครราชสีมา, pronounced [mɯ̂aŋ nà(ʔ).kʰɔ̂ːn lâːt.sā.sǐː.mâː]) is one of 32 districts of Nakhon Ratchasima province, northeastern Thailand.

== Overview ==
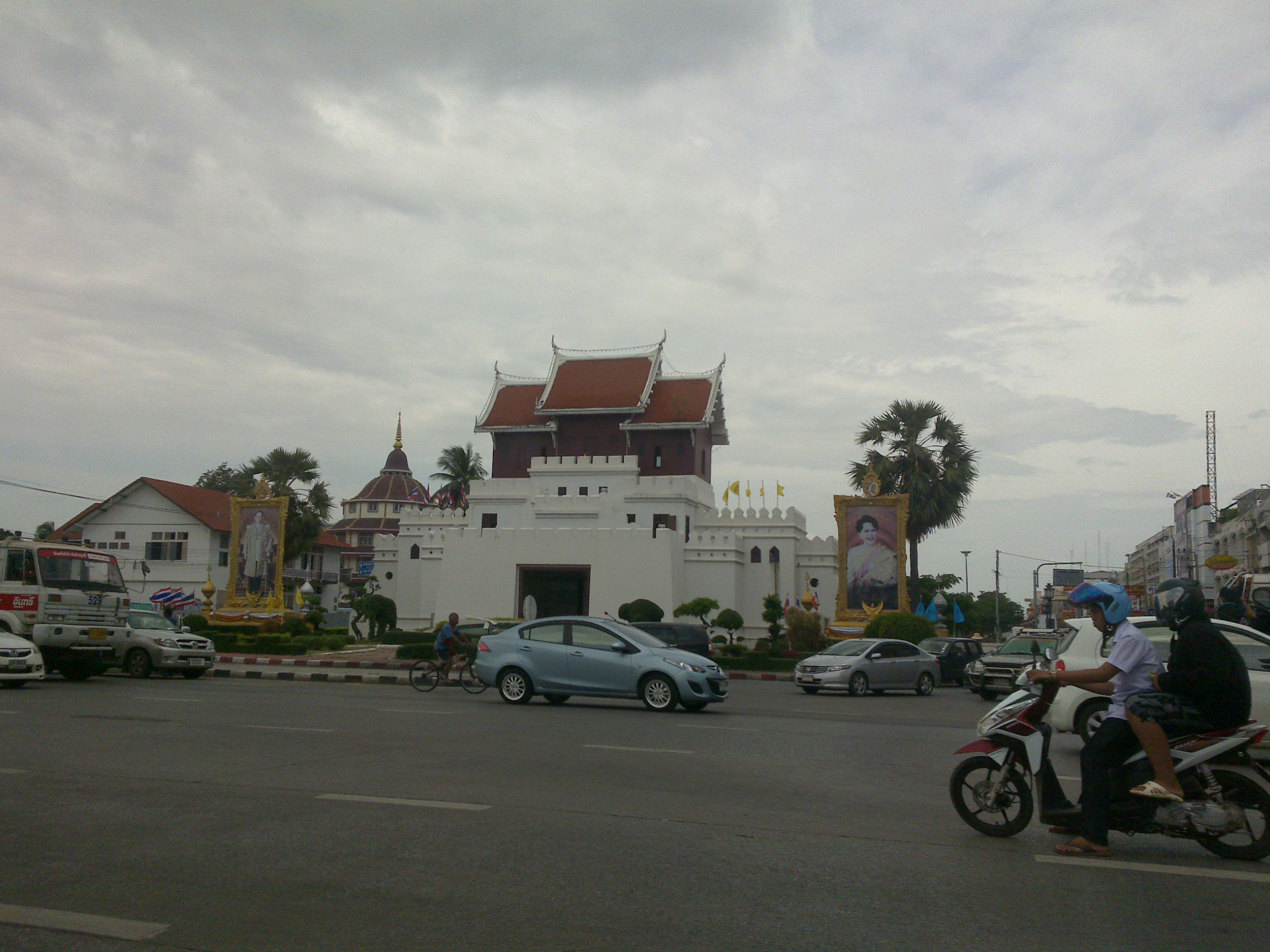
Main Gate, Korat

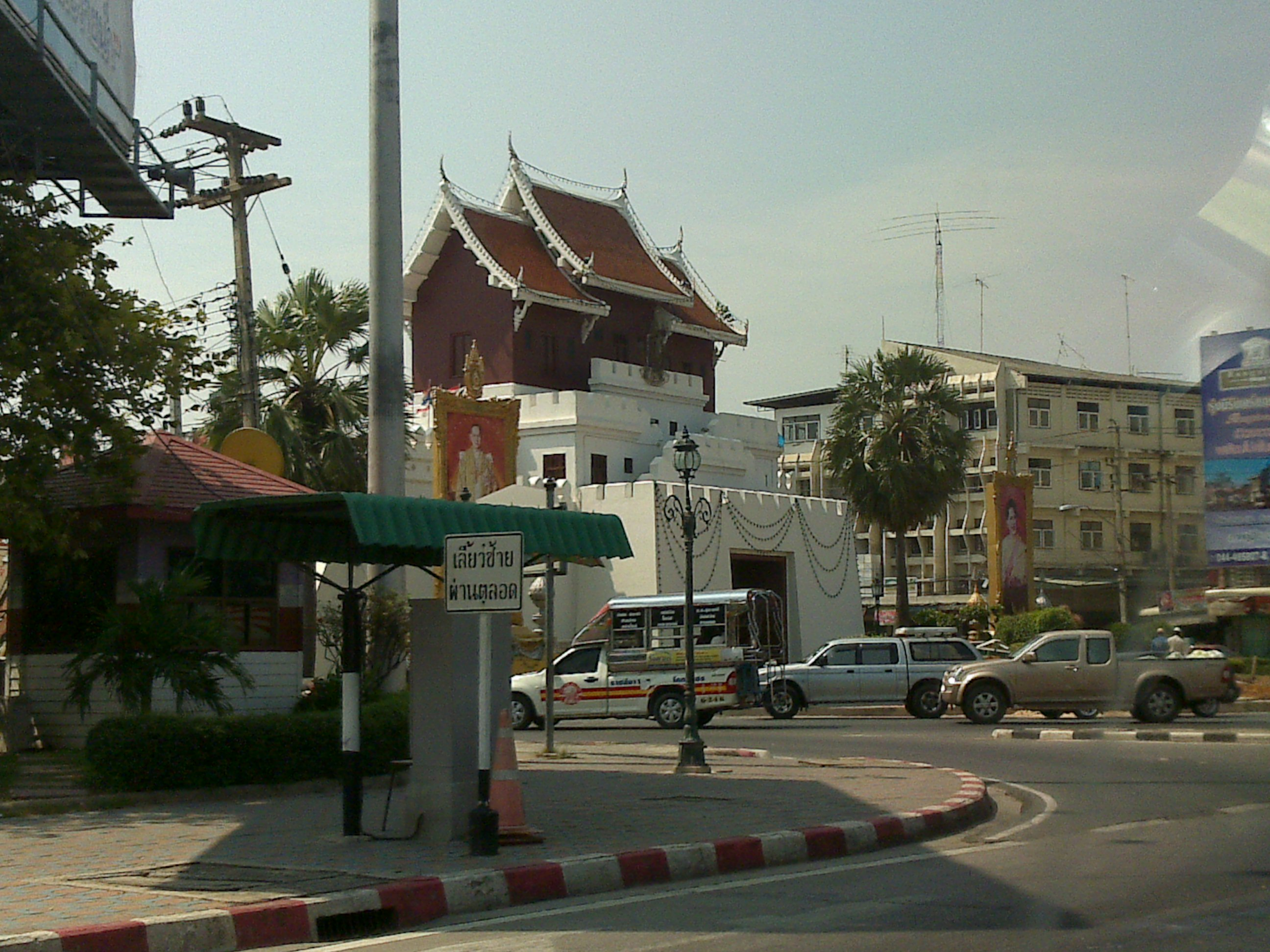
Main gate of Khorat

Nakhon Ratchasima was built in the reign of King Narai the Great of Ayutthaya kingdom. The king merged two cities, Mueang Sema and Mueang Khorakha Pura (Khorat), and moved to the present area. He named the new city "Nakhon Ratchasima".

"Khorat", as it is commonly known, is on the Khorat Plateau, the lower part of northeastern plateau of Thailand. The city itself serves as the gateway to the northeastern region. From Bangkok, it is 259 km by road. It has an area of 468,704 rai (750 km^{2}; 290 mi^{2}) with a population of 433,838 inhabitants (2008).

== Geography ==
Neighbouring districts are (from the north clockwise): Non Thai, Non Sung, Chaloem Phra Kiat, Chok Chai, Pak Thong Chai, Sung Noen, and Kham Thale So.

The main river through the district is the Lam Takhong.

== Administration ==
The district is divided into 25 sub-districts (tambons) with 27 local administrations.

The district contains 9 sub-district municipalities (thesaban tambon) and one city municipality (thesaban nakhon). The City of Nakhon Ratchasima or Korat City, covers the area of Nai Mueang Sub-district (tambon) and parts of Ban Ko Sub-district. Nine township municipalities (thesaban tambons): Pho Klang covers Pho Klang Sub-district; Hua Thale covers Hua Tale Sub-district; Nong Phai Lom covers Nong Phai Lom Sub-district; Cho Ho covers parts of Cho Ho Sub-district and parts of Ban Ko Sub-district; Khok Sung covers Khok Sung Sub-district; Pru Yai covers Pru Yai Sub-district; Khok Kruat and Mueang Mai Khok Kruat cover Khok Kruat Sub-district; Nong Khai Nam covers Nong Khai Nam Sub-district.

	Municipality	Sub-districts	Population (2010)	Area (km^{2})	Distance To District Office (km)	Pop. density (per km^{2})	Household (unit)
1.	City of Nakhon Ratchasima	Nai Mueang, Ban Ko	141,714	37.50	1.3	3,779	61,184
2.	Pho Klang	Pho Klang	25,632	55.23	8.5	464	10,121
3.	Hua Thale	Hua Thale	24,587	15.59	8	1,577	10,404
4.	Nong Phai Lom	Nong Phai Lom	19,744	17.89	3	1,104	10,285
5.	Cho Ho	Cho Ho อำเภอ จอหอ, Ban Ko	15,239	9.50	8	1,604	7,428
6.	Mueang Mai Khok Kruat	Khok Kruat	12,576	64.17	13	193	4,671
7.	Khok Sung	Khok Sung	9,758	30.56	15	302	3,098
8.	Pru Yai	Pru Yai	9,365	16.63	11	601	3,939
9.	Khok Kruat	Khok Kruat	7,160	3.00	18	2,387	2,951
10.	Nong Khai Nam	Nong Khai Nam	5,835	43.44	19	134	1,434

And 17 Subdistrict Administrative Organizations (SAO): Ban Ko, Ban Mai, Ban Pho, Chai Mongkhon, Cho Ho, Maroeng, Muen Wai, Nong Bua Sala, Nong Chabok, Nong Krathum, Nong Rawiang, Phanao, Phon Krang, Phutsa, Si Num, Suranaree and Talat responsible for the non-municipal areas.

	Subdistrict Administrative Organization (SAO)	Population (2010 census)	Area (km^{2})	Distance To District Office(km.)	Pop. density (Pop. per km^{2})	Households (unit)
1.	Ban Mai	17,544	19.55	8	897	5,934
2.	Nong Bua Sala	17,155	36.61	10	468	9,177
3.	Suranaree	16,070	49.90	15	322	7,299
4.	Cho Ho ตำบล จอหอ	12,447	26.97	12.5	462	4,403
5.	Nong Chabok	11,637	23.56	7	494	4,643
6.	Nong Rawiang	10,828	54.77	16	199	3,287
7.	Ban Ko	10,715	11.30	6	948	4,932
8.	Muen Wai	10,077	9.76	5	1,032	4,489
9.	Phutsa	9,512	39.46	11	241	2,655
10.	Ban Pho	8,931	44.36	18	201	3,096
11.	Maroeng	7,063	10.25	10.5	689	2,239
12.	Nong Krathum	6,957	18.50	8	376	2,978
13.	Chai Mongkhon	6,738	60.18	18	112	2,645
14.	Si Mum	6,301	15.0	15	420	1,812
15.	Talat	6,187	22.20	15	279	2,448
16.	Phanao	4,872	18.16	9	268.28	1,407
17.	Phon Krang	4,796	18.65	17	257	1,103
