= Sung Noen district =

Sung Noen สูงเนิน
- District
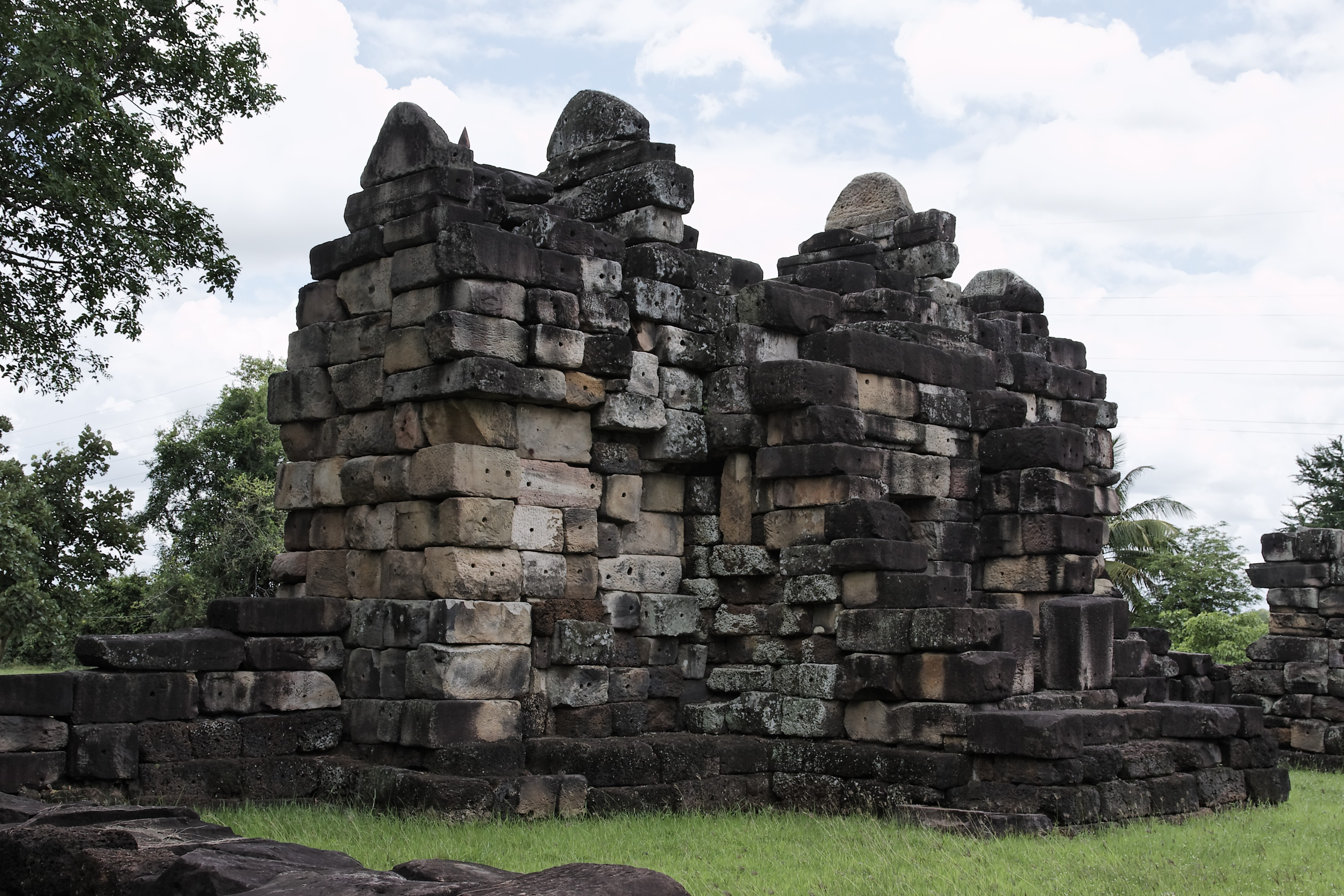
- Prasat Mueang Kao, an ancient Khmer temple located in Sung Noen

- District location in Nakhon Ratchasima province
- Coordinates: 14°54′0″N 101°49′18″E
- Country: Thailand
- Province: Nakhon Ratchasima
- Seat: Sung Noen

Area
  - Total: 782.9 km^{2} (302.3 sq mi)

Population (2014)
  - Total: 82,383
  - Density: 97.1/km^{2} (251/sq mi)
- Time zone: UTC+7 (ICT)
- Postal code: 30170, 30380
- Geocode: 3018

Sung Noen (Thai: สูงเนิน, pronounced [sǔːŋ nɤ̄ːn]; Northeastern Thai: สูงเนิน, pronounced [sǔːŋ nɤ̂ːn]) is a district (amphoe) in the western part of Nakhon Ratchasima province, northeastern Thailand. It contains Mueang Sema, one of the largest moated towns of the Khorat Plateau and a major site of the Dvaravati period. An old town in the district has also been identified with Mueang Rat, the seat of Pha Mueang, though the identification is disputed.

== History ==
The literal translation of Sung Noen is 'high hills', as the area has two high (sung) hills (noen) beside a pond, and has never been flooded. Sung Noen was the location of two ancient cities, Mueang Sema and Khorakha (Khorat) Pura. (Note: Pali púra became Sanskrit puri, hence Thai บุรี, บูรี (buri) all connoting the same as Thai mueang: city with defensive wall)

Mueang Sema, on the Lam Ta Khong in the Mun system, covers over 150 ha and is one of the two largest moated settlements of the Khorat Plateau. Its excavator assigned the earliest phase, of the 4th and 5th centuries, to late prehistory. The second, of the 6th to 9th, was assigned to the Dvaravati period, and the third, of the 9th to 12th, to a time of growing Khmer influence. Stephen A. Murphy disputes the first of those labels. Pottery from the earliest layers recurs at Chan Sen in the central plain and develops there into a common Dvaravati type, and the site has no earlier prehistoric levels at all. Finds from the site include a dhammacakra and an 11-metre sandstone Buddha in the reclining mahāparinirvāṇa posture. Only seventeen sema stones are recorded there, all of them plain or badly worn and none carved with narrative scenes, which Murphy sets against the size and standing of the town. A few still stand where they were placed, around a Dvaravati structure that may have been an ordination hall. The dhammacakra is the only one known from the whole of the Khorat Plateau, against more than forty recorded in central Thailand. Murphy holds that apart from Mueang Sema it is hard to make a case for a strong or meaningful political presence of Dvaravati overlords on the plateau.

A survey by Sujit Wongthes describes villages ringing the town, each centred on a temple. They held Dvaravati Buddha images and Lopburi-style door posts, and alignments of standing stones lie at Ban Hin Tang. He read an earthen dam across the Huai Krok Chanuan and a set of canals as irrigation works. He put the reclining Buddha at up to 12 metres and reported a view that it was first a standing image that later fell.

The old town at Sung Noen has been identified with Mueang Rat, the seat of Pha Mueang, one of the founders of the Sukhothai Kingdom. The identification is disputed. Sujit Wongthes, reviewing the proposals in 1983, found the location of Mueang Rat unsettled. Besides Sung Noen they include the present city of Nakhon Ratchasima and sites in Phitsanulok and Uttaradit provinces.

When the Northeastern railway was finished in 1901, the village of Ban Sung Noen grew around it, and the government raised Sung Noen to district status.

== Geography ==
Neighbouring districts are (from the north clockwise) Dan Khun Thot, Kham Thale So, Mueang Nakhon Ratchasima, Pak Thong Chai, Wang Nam Khiao and Sikhio.

== Administration ==
=== Central administration ===
Sung Noen is divided into 11 subdistricts (tambons), which are further subdivided into 127 administrative villages (mubans).

No.	Name	Thai	Villages	Pop.
1.	Sung Noen	สูงเนิน	15	19,662
2.	Sema	เสมา	16	9,212
3.	Khorat	โคราช	8	2,615
4.	Bung Khilek	บุ่งขี้เหล็ก	13	4,434
5.	Non Kha	โนนค่า	8	4,971
6.	Khong Yang	โค้งยาง	8	2,633
7.	Makluea Kao	มะเกลือเก่า	20	12,685
8.	Makluea Mai	มะเกลือใหม่	12	8,000
9.	Na Klang	นากลาง	9	6,494
10.	Nong Takai	หนองตะไก้	12	6,961
11.	Kut Chik	กุดจิก	6	4,716

=== Local administration ===
There are two subdistrict municipalities (thesaban tambons) in the district:

- Kut Chik (Thai: เทศบาลตำบลกุดจิก) consisting of parts of subdistricts Na Klang, Kut Chik.
- Sung Noen (Thai: เทศบาลตำบลสูงเนิน) consisting of parts of subdistrict Sung Noen.

There are 11 subdistrict administrative organizations (SAO) in the district:

- Sung Noen (Thai: องค์การบริหารส่วนตำบลสูงเนิน) consisting of parts of subdistrict Sung Noen.
- Sema (Thai: องค์การบริหารส่วนตำบลเสมา) consisting of subdistrict Sema.
- Khorat (Thai: องค์การบริหารส่วนตำบลโคราช) consisting of subdistrict Khorat.
- Bung Khilek (Thai: องค์การบริหารส่วนตำบลบุ่งขี้เหล็ก) consisting of subdistrict Bung Khilek.
- Non Kha (Thai: องค์การบริหารส่วนตำบลโนนค่า) consisting of subdistrict Non Kha.
- Khong Yang (Thai: องค์การบริหารส่วนตำบลโค้งยาง) consisting of subdistrict Khong Yang.
- Makluea Kao (Thai: องค์การบริหารส่วนตำบลมะเกลือเก่า) consisting of subdistrict Makluea Kao.
- Makluea Mai (Thai: องค์การบริหารส่วนตำบลมะเกลือใหม่) consisting of subdistrict Makluea Mai.
- Na Klang (Thai: องค์การบริหารส่วนตำบลนากลาง) consisting of parts of Na Klang.
- Nong Takai (Thai: องค์การบริหารส่วนตำบลหนองตะไก้) consisting of subdistrict Nong Takai.
- Kut Chik (Thai: องค์การบริหารส่วนตำบลกุดจิก) consisting of parts of subdistrict Kut Chik.

== See also ==
- Bai sema
