= Non Thai district =

Non Thai โนนไทย
- District
- District location in Nakhon Ratchasima province
- Coordinates: 15°11′54″N 102°4′10″E
- Country: Thailand
- Province: Nakhon Ratchasima
- Seat: Non Thai

Area
  - Total: 542.0 km^{2} (209.3 sq mi)

Population (2015)
  - Total: 72,039
  - Density: 138.2/km^{2} (358/sq mi)
- Time zone: UTC+7 (ICT)
- Postal code: 30220
- Geocode: 3009

Non Thai (Thai: โนนไทย, pronounced [nōːn tʰāj]; Northeastern Thai: โนนไทย, pronounced [nôːn tʰâj]) is a district (amphoe) of Nakhon Ratchasima province, northeastern Thailand.

== History ==
Originally, the area was Khwaeng San Thia (แขวงสันเทียะ). San Thia is Khmer, meaning 'a place to gather salt'. The name refers to the tradition of salt production in the area.

In 1900, Khwaeng San Thia was changed to a district and renamed Non Lao. The following year it was named San Thia. In 1919, the district name was changed to Non Lao again. Finally in the phase of Thai nationalism under Field Marshal Plaek Phibunsongkhram, the district name was changed to Non Thai in 1939 to remove the reference to the Lao population in the name.

== Geography ==
Neighbouring districts are (from the north clockwise): Phra Thong Kham, Kham Sakaesaeng, Non Sung, Mueang Nakhon Ratchasima, Kham Thale So, and Dan Khun Thot.

== Administration ==
=== Central administration ===
Non Thai is divided into 10 sub-districts (tambons), which are further subdivided into 133 administrative villages (mubans).

No.	Name	Thai	Villages	Pop.
1.	Non Thai	โนนไทย	17	12,891
2.	Dan Chak	ด่านจาก	13	8,740
3.	Kampang	กำปัง	16	9,699
4.	Samrong	สำโรง	17	6,981
5.	Khang Phlu	ค้างพลู	10	5,404
6.	Ban Wang	บ้านวัง	11	4,715
7.	Banlang	บัลลังก์	19	7,928
8.	Sai O	สายออ	11	7,558
9.	Thanon Pho	ถนนโพธิ์	9	3,987
14.	Makha	มะค่า	10	4,136

Missing numbers are tambon which now form Phra Thong Kham District.

=== Local administration ===
There are three sub-district municipalities (thesaban tambons) in the district:

- Khok Sawai (Thai: เทศบาลตำบลโคกสวาย) consisting of parts of sub-district Sai O.
- Non Thai (Thai: เทศบาลตำบลโนนไทย) consisting of parts of sub-district Non Thai.
- Banlang (Thai: เทศบาลตำบลบัลลังก์) consisting of sub-district Banlang.

There are nine sub-district administrative organizations (SAO) in the district:

- Non Thai (Thai: องค์การบริหารส่วนตำบลโนนไทย) consisting of parts of sub-district Non Thai.
- Dan Chak (Thai: องค์การบริหารส่วนตำบลด่านจาก) consisting of sub-district Dan Chak.
- Kampang (Thai: องค์การบริหารส่วนตำบลกำปัง) consisting of sub-district Kampang.
- Samrong (Thai: องค์การบริหารส่วนตำบลสำโรง) consisting of sub-district Samrong.
- Khang Phlu (Thai: องค์การบริหารส่วนตำบลค้างพลู) consisting of sub-district Khang Phlu.
- Ban Wang (Thai: องค์การบริหารส่วนตำบลบ้านวัง) consisting of sub-district Ban Wang.
- Sai O (Thai: องค์การบริหารส่วนตำบลสายออ) consisting of parts of sub-district Sai O.
- Thanon Pho (Thai: องค์การบริหารส่วนตำบลถนนโพธิ์) consisting of sub-district Thanon Pho.
- Makha (Thai: องค์การบริหารส่วนตำบลมะค่า) consisting of sub-district Makha.
