= List of railway stations in Thailand =

This is a list of all railway stations in Thailand that are or was operated by State Railway of Thailand (SRT). This list does not include rapid transit stations of the BTS Skytrain, MRT and SRTET (Airport Rail Link) and SRT Red Lines.

== Open Railway Stations and Halts ==
The following table lists all open railway stations in Thailand as of September 2021 in English alphabetical order. All stations are on the Northern Line, Northeastern Line, Southern Line, Eastern Line or the Maeklong Railway and their respective branch lines railway station open all total is 446 station 4,044 km 46 province in thailand.

English name	Thai Name	Station Code	Station Class	Line	District	Province	Notes
Ai Satia	ไอสะเตีย	ไอ.	Halt	Southern	Cho-airong	Narathiwat	
Aranyaprathet	อรัญประเทศ	อร.	2	Eastern	Aranyaprathet	Sa Kaeo	
Asok	อโศก	อโ.	Halt	Eastern	Ratchathewi	Bangkok	
Assumption Convent School	โรงเรียนอัสสัมชัญคอนแวนต์	อแ.	Halt	Northeastern	Chai Badan	Lopburi	
Aviation Academy	โรงเรียนการบิน	ริ.	Halt	Southern	Kamphaeng Saen	Nakhon Pathom	
Ayutthaya	อยุธยา	อย.	1	Northern, Northeastern	Phra Nakhon Si Ayutthaya	Phra Nakhon Si Ayutthaya	Main station for Phra Nakhon Si Ayutthaya Province.
Balo	บาลอ	าล.	4	Southern	Raman	Yala	
Bamnet Narong	บำเหน็จณรงค์	าจ.	2	Northeastern	Bamnet Narong	Chaiyaphum	
Ban Bo	บ้านบ่อ	บ่.	Halt	Maeklong	Mueang	Samut Sakhon	
Ban Bung	บ้านบุ่ง	บง.	4	Northern	Phrom Phiram	Phitsanulok	
Ban Chang	บ้านฉาง	บฉ.	4	Eastern	Ban Chang	Rayong	Freight use only.
Ban Chi Phakhao	บ้านชีผ้าขาว	ผา.	Halt	Maeklong	Mueang	Samut Sakhon	
Ban Chimphli	บ้านฉิมพลี	ฉพ.	Halt	Southern	Taling Chan	Bangkok	
Ban Chong Tai	บ้านช่องใต้	ชต.	3	Northeastern	Kaeng Khoi	Saraburi	
Ban Chongko	บ้านจงโก	จโ.	Halt	Northeastern	Lam Sonthi	Lopburi	
Ban Dan	บ้านด่าน	บด.	4	Northern	Mueang	Uttaradit	
Ban Dara Junction	ชุมทางบ้านดารา	ดร.	3	Northern	Phichai	Uttaradit	Junction for the Northern Main Line and Northern Line Sawankhalok Branch.
Ban Din Lan	บ้านดินลาน	ดล.	4	Southern	Bang Klam	Songkhla	
Ban Don Klang	บ้านดอนกลาง	ลก.	Halt	Northern, Northeastern	Uthai	Phra Nakhon Si Ayutthaya	
Ban Don Rak	บ้านดอนรัก	รก.	Halt	Southern	Phunphin	Surat Thani	
Ban Don Riap	บ้านดอนเรียบ	ดเ.	Halt	Southern	Phunphin	Surat Thani	
Ban Don Yai	บ้านดอนใหญ่	ดญ.	4	Northeastern	Khong	Nakhon Ratchasima	
Ban Dong Bang	บ้านดงบัง	ดบ.	4	Eastern	Prachantakham	Prachinburi	
Ban Dong Phlong	บ้านดงพลอง	ดพ.	3	Northeastern	Non Sung	Nakhon Ratchasima	
Ban Duat	บ้านดวด	ดว.	3	Southern	Lamae	Chumphon	
Ban Haet	บ้านแฮด	ฮด.	3	Northeastern	Ban Haet	Khon Kaen	
Ban Han	บ้านหัน	าห.	3	Northeastern	Non Sila	Khon Kaen	
Ban Hin Khon	บ้านหินโคน	หโ.	3	Northeastern	Chakkarat	Nakhon Ratchasima	
Ban Huai Khwang	บ้านห้วยขวาง	ยข.	3	Eastern	Bang Lamung	Chonburi	
Ban Huai Taen	บ้านห้วยแตน	ยแ.	Halt	Southern	Khao Chaison	Phatthalung	
Ban Huai Yoong	บ้านห้วยยูง	ยู.	Halt	Southern	Phra Phrom	Nakhon Si Thammarat	
Ban Kaeng	บ้านแก้ง	บแ.	Halt	Eastern	Mueang	Sa Kaeo	
Ban Kalan	บ้านกะลัน	ลน.	3	Northeastern	Sikhoraphum	Surin	
Ban Kalong	บ้านกาหลง	กห.	Halt	Maeklong	Mueang	Samut Sakhon	
Ban Kao Ngiu	บ้านเก่างิ้ว	งิ.	Halt	Northeastern	Bua Yai	Nakhon Ratchasima	
Ban Kao	บ้านเก่า	าน.	Halt	Southern	Mueang	Kanchanaburi	
Ban Khai Thai	บ้านค่ายไทย	ทย.	Halt	Southern	Mueang	Phatthalung	
Ban Khanai	บ้านขนาย	าย.	Halt	Southern	Phunphin	Surat Thani	
Ban Khlo	บ้านคล้อ	าค.	3	Northeastern	Kanthararom	Sisaket	
Ban Khok Krabuang	บ้านโคกกระเบื้อง	ะอ.	Halt	Northeastern	Ban Lueam	Nakhon Ratchasima	
Ban Khok Ma	บ้านคอกม้า	คา.	3	Southern	Pathio	Chumphon	
Ban Khom	บ้านขอม	ขม.	Halt	Maeklong	Mueang	Samut Sakhon	
Ban Khon Hat	บ้านขอนหาด	ขห.	3	Southern	Cha-uat	Nakhon Si Thammarat	
Ban Khon	บ้านโคน	บค.	3	Northern	Phichai	Uttaradit	
Ban Khron	บ้านครน	คร.	Halt	Southern	Sawi	Chumphon	
Ban Khu Bua	บ้านคูบัว	บบ.	3	Southern	Mueang	Ratchaburi	
Ban Klap	บ้านกลับ	บก.	3	Northern	Nong Don	Saraburi	
Ban Kloi	บ้านกลอย	ย้.	Halt	Northeastern	Bamnet Narong	Chaiyaphum	
Ban Klong Luk Border	ด่านพรมแดนบ้านคลองลึก	ลง.	3	Eastern	Aranyaprathet	Sa Kaeo	Border Station with Cambodia (Poipet).
Ban Kluay	บ้านกล้วย	าก.	3	Southern	Mueang	Ratchaburi	
Ban Ko Daeng	บ้านเกาะแดง	เด.	Halt	Eastern	Kabin Buri	Prachinburi	
Ban Ko Muk	บ้านเกาะมุกข์	ะม.	Halt	Southern	Tha Chana	Surat Thani	
Ban Ko Pring	บ้านเกาะปริง	ะป.	Halt	Southern	Thung Song	Nakhon Si Thammarat	
Ban Ko	บ้านเกาะ	กะ.	3	Northeastern	Mueang	Nakhon Ratchasima	
Ban Ko Rang	บ้านเกาะรัง	รง.	Halt	Northeastern	Chai Badan	Lopburi	
Ban Ko Yai	บ้านเกาะใหญ่	กใ.	3	Southern	Khuan Niang	Songkhla	
Ban Koei Chen	บ้านเกยเชน	กซ.	Halt	Southern	Ron Phibun	Nakhon Si Thammarat	
Ban Kok Kwaow	บ้านกกกว้าว	ว้.	Halt	Northern	Takhli	Nakhon Sawan	
Ban Kradon	บ้านกระโดน	กโ.	3	Northeastern	Mueang	Nakhon Ratchasima	
Ban Kraphi	บ้านกระพี้	พี.	Halt	Northeastern	Bua Yai	Nakhon Ratchasima	
Ban Krut	บ้านกรูด	กร.	2	Southern	Bang Saphan	Prachuap Khiri Khan	
Ban Laem	บ้านแหลม	แห.	3	Maeklong	Mueang	Samut Sakhon	
Ban Lueam	บ้านเหลื่อม	นเ.	2	Northeastern	Ban Lueam	Nakhon Ratchasima	
Ban Ma	บ้านม้า	มา.	3	Northern, Northeastern	Phra Nakhon Si Ayutthaya	Phra Nakhon Si Ayutthaya	
Ban Mai	บ้านใหม่	บห.	3	Northern	Mueang	Phitsanulok	
Ban Mai Samrong	บ้านใหม่สำโรง	สำ.	3	Northeastern	Sikhio	Nakhon Ratchasima	
Ban Makha	บ้านมะค่า	มค.	3	Northeastern	Non Sung	Nakhon Ratchasima	
Ban Makok Tai	บ้านมะกอกใต้	บใ.	Halt	Southern	Khuan Khanun	Phatthalung	
Ban Mi	บ้านหมี่	บม.	1	Northern	Ban Mi	Lopburi	
Ban Mo	บ้านหมอ	มอ.	1	Northern	Ban Mo	Saraburi	
Ban Na Khok	บ้านนาโคก	าโ.	Halt	Maeklong	Mueang	Samut Sakhon	
Ban Na Khwang	บ้านนาขวาง	บ้.	Halt	Maeklong	Mueang	Samut Sakhon	
Ban Na	บ้านนา	นน.	3	Southern	Ban Na Doem	Surat Thani	
Ban Nang Long	บ้านนางหลง	นล.	3	Southern	Cha-uat	Nakhon Si Thammarat	
Ban Niam	บ้านเนียม	นเ.	3	Northeastern	Uthumphon Phisai	Sisaket	
Ban Nikhom	บ้านนิคม	นิ.	Halt	Southern	Khok Pho	Pattani	
Ban Non Phueng	บ้านโนนผึ้ง	นผ.	Halt	Northeastern	Kanthararom	Sisaket	
Ban Nong Bua	บ้านหนองบัว	าบ.	Halt	Northeastern	Phatthana Nikhom	Lopburi	
Ban Nong Kan Nga	บ้านหนองกันงา	ก้.	Halt	Northeastern	Mueang	Nakhon Ratchasima	
Ban Nong Kham	บ้านหนองขาม	บ้.	Halt	Northeastern	Noen Sa-nga	Chaiyaphum	
Ban Nong Prue Pong	บ้านหนองปรือโป่ง	นป.	Halt	Northeastern	Ban Lueam	Nakhon Ratchasima	
Ban Nong Sriwichai	บ้านหนองศรีวิชัย	ศิ.	Halt	Eastern	Prachantakham	Prachinburi	
Ban Nong Tat	บ้านหนองตาด	ตา.	3	Northeastern	Mueang	Buriram	
Ban Pa Kai	บ้านป่าไก่	ไป.	Halt	Southern	Pak Tho	Ratchaburi	
Ban Pa Wai	บ้านป่าหวาย	ปว.	3	Northern	Mueang	Lopburi	
Ban Pak Chap	บ้านปากจาบ	จบ.	Halt	Northeastern	Bamnet Narong	Chaiyaphum	
Ban Pak Phli	บ้านปากพลี	าป.	3	Eastern	Pak Phli	Nakhon Nayok	Only passenger station in Nakhon Nayok Province, making it the de facto provincial station.
Ban Patae	บ้านปาแต	ตแ.	Halt	Southern	Raman	Yala	
Ban Phachi Junction	ชุมทางบ้านภาชี	ภช.	1	Northern, Northeastern	Phachi	Phra Nakhon Si Ayutthaya	Junction for Northern and Northeastern Main Lines.
Ban Phai Na Bun Junction	ชุมทางบ้านไผ่นาบุญ	บญ.	3	Northeastern, Eastern	Mueang	Saraburi	Freight-only. Junction for Northeastern Main Line and the Eastern Line Phra Phutthachai Branch.
Ban Phai	บ้านไผ่	บผ.	1	Northeastern	Ban Phai	Khon Kaen	
Ban Phanao	บ้านพะเนา	พเ.	3	Northeastern	Mueang	Nakhon Ratchasima	
Ban Phlu Ta Luang	บ้านพลูตาหลวง	พต.	3	Eastern	Sattahip	Chonburi	
Ban Pho	บ้านโพ	บพ.	3	Northern, Northeastern	Bang Pa-in	Phra Nakhon Si Ayutthaya	
Ban Phra Phut	บ้านพระพุทธ	ะท.	Halt	Northeastern	Chaloem Phra Kiat	Nakhon Ratchasima	
Ban Phrom Saeng	บ้านพรมแสง	พส.	Halt	Eastern	Kabin Buri	Prachinburi	
Ban Phru Krachaeng	บ้านพรุกระแชง	แช.	3	Southern	Wiang Sa	Surat Thani	
Ban Pin	บ้านปิน	บป.	2	Northern	Long	Phrae	
Ban Plak Raet	บ้านปลักแรด	แด.	Halt	Northern	Tha Ruea	Phra Nakhon Si Ayutthaya	
Ban Pokpaek	บ้านป๊อกแป๊ก	ปป.	2	Northeastern	Mueang	Saraburi	
Ban Pong Kom	บ้านโป่งคอม	อม.	Halt	Eastern	Watthana Nakhon	Sa Kaeo	
Ban Pong	บ้านโป่ง	โป.	1	Southern	Ban Pong	Ratchaburi	
Ban Pong Sieo	บ้านโป่งเสี้ยว	ปเ.	Halt	Southern	Mueang	Kanchanaburi	
Ban Pu Pong	บ้านพุพง	พุ.	Halt	Southern	Sai Yok	Kanchanaburi	
Ban Rai	บ้านไร่	นไ.	Halt	Northeastern	Bua Yai	Nakhon Ratchasima	
Ban Sa Khrok	บ้านสระครก	ะค.	Halt	Northeastern	Bua Yai	Nakhon Ratchasima	
Ban Sai Thong	บ้านทรายทอง	ซท.	Halt	Southern	Bang Saphan Noi	Prachuap Khiri Khan	
Ban Salaeng Phan	บ้านแสลงพัน	งพ.	3	Northeastern	Lam Plai Mat	Buriram	
Ban Salo Bukit Yuaerae	บ้านสะโลว์บูกิ๊ตยือแร	ยื.	Halt	Southern	Rueso	Narathiwat	
Ban Sang	บ้านสร้าง	สา.	3	Eastern	Ban Sang	Prachinburi	
Ban Sap Somboon	บ้านทรัพย์สมบูรณ์	ซส.	Halt	Southern	Pathio	Chumphon	
Ban Sok Rang	บ้านโสกรัง	บั.	Halt	Northeastern	Bua Yai	Nakhon Ratchasima	
Ban Song	บ้านส้อง	สอ.	1	Southern	Wiang Sa	Surat Thani	
Ban Sunthra	บ้านสุนทรา	บท.	Halt	Southern	Khuan Khanun	Phatthalung	
Ban Ta Noen	บ้านตาเนิน	บต.	Halt	Northeastern	Noen Sa-nga	Chaiyaphum	
Ban Tae	บ้านแต้	แต.	Halt	Northeastern	Uthumphon Phisai	Sisaket	
Ban Takhli	บ้านตาคลี	ตล.	1	Northern	Takhli	Nakhon Sawan	
Ban Tako	บ้านตะโก	ตโ.	Halt	Northeastern	Mueang	Buriram	
Ban Teng Nam	บ้านเต็งหนาม	เห.	3	Northern	Mueang	Phitsanulok	
Ban Tha Chang	บ้านท่าช้าง	บช.	Halt	Southern	Phra Phrom	Nakhon Si Thammarat	
Ban Thap Chang	บ้านทับช้าง	ทช.	2	Eastern	Prawet	Bangkok	
Ban Thon	บ้านถ่อน	บถ.	Halt	Northeastern	Warin Chamrap	Ubon Ratchathani	
Ban Thung Khai	บ้านทุ่งค่าย	น่.	Halt	Southern	Cha-uat	Nakhon Si Thammarat	
Ban Thung Lo	บ้านทุ่งหล่อ	ลอ.	3	Southern	Chaloem Phra Kiat	Nakhon Si Thammarat	
Ban Thung Luang	บ้านทุ่งหลวง	าว.	Halt	Southern	Phunphin	Surat Thani	
Ban Thung Pho Junction	ชุมทางบ้านทุ่งโพธิ์	ทโ.	2	Southern	Phunphin	Surat Thani	Junction for the Southern Main Line and the Southern Line Khiri Rat Nikhom Branch.
Ban Ton Don	บ้านต้นโดน	บโ.	3	Southern	Khao Chaison	Phatthalung	
Ban Trok Kae	บ้านตรอกแค	คั.	Halt	Southern	Cha-uat	Nakhon Si Thammarat	
Ban Tum	บ้านตูม	ตม.	3	Northern	Mueang	Phitsanulok	
Ban Tun	บ้านตูล	ตน.	3	Southern	Cha-uat	Nakhon Si Thammarat	
Ban Wa Tabaek (Thep Sathit)	บ้านวะตะแบก (เทพสถิต)	แบ.	3	Northeastern	Thep Sathit	Chaiyaphum	
Ban Wang Chai	บ้านวังชัย	วช.	Halt	Northeastern	Nam Phong	Khon Kaen	
Ban Yang	บ้านยาง	ง้.	Halt	Southern	Khiri Rat Nikhom	Surat Thani	
Bandai Ma	บันไดม้า	ได.	2	Northeastern	Pak Chong	Nakhon Ratchasima	
Bang Bamru	บางบำหรุ	บำ.	1	Southern	Bang Phlat	Bangkok	
Bang Bon	บางบอน	าา.	Halt	Maeklong	Bang Bon	Bangkok	
Bang Chak	บางจาก	จก.	3	Southern	Mueang	Phetchaburi	
Bang Kaeo	บางแก้ว	แก.	2	Southern	Bang Kaeo	Phatthalung	
Bang Khem	บางเค็ม	งเ.	3	Southern	Amphawa	Samut Songkhram	
Bang Klam	บางกล่ำ	บล.	2	Southern	Bang Klam	Songkhla	
Bang Krachao	บางกระเจ้า	ะจ.	Halt	Maeklong	Mueang	Samut Sakhon	
Bang Krathum	บางกระทุ่ม	ทม.	2	Northern	Bang Krathum	Phitsanulok	
Bang Lamung	บางละมุง	มุ.	1	Eastern	Bang Lamung	Chonburi	
Bang Mun Nak	บางมูลนาก	นา.	1	Northern	Bang Mun Nak	Phichit	
Bang Nam Jued	บางน้ำจืด	นจ.	Halt	Maeklong	Mueang	Samut Sakhon	
Bang Nam Priao	บางน้ำเปรี้ยว	บย.	3	Eastern	Bang Nam Priao	Chachoengsao	
Bang Pa-in	บางปะอิน	บอ.	1	Northern, Northeastern	Bang Pa-in	Phra Nakhon Si Ayutthaya	
Bang Phra	บางพระ	ระ.	3	Eastern	Si Racha	Chonburi	
Bang Ramat	บางระมาด	รม.	Halt	Southern	Taling Chan	Bangkok	
Bang Saphan Noi	บางสะพานน้อย	พน.	2	Southern	Bang Saphan Noi	Prachuap Khiri Khan	
Bang Saphan Yai	บางสะพานใหญ่	พญ.	1	Southern	Bang Saphan	Prachuap Khiri Khan	
Bang Si Khot	บางสีคต	บี.	Halt	Maeklong	Mueang	Samut Sakhon	
Bang Son	บางซ่อน	ซอ.	Halt	Southern	Bang Sue	Bangkok	
Bang Sue Junction	ชุมทางบางซื่อ	บซ.	1	Northern, Northeastern, Southern	Bang Sue	Bangkok	Old Bang Sue station, serving ordinary trains terminating at Bangkok (Hua Lamphong).
Bang Thorat	บางโทรัด	งโ.	Halt	Maeklong	Mueang	Samut Sakhon	
Bang Toei	บางเตย	งย.	Halt	Eastern	Mueang	Chachoengsao	
Bangkok (Hua Lamphong)	กรุงเทพ (หัวลำโพง)	กท.	Special Station	Northern, Northeastern, Southern, Eastern	Pathum Wan	Bangkok	Former central railway station of Bangkok. Officially known only as "Bangkok" until the opening of Krung Thep Aphiwat Central Terminal.
Bo Krang	บ่อกรัง	กง.	Halt	Southern	Phunphin	Surat Thani	
Bo Nok	บ่อนอก	บน.	3	Southern	Mueang	Prachuap Khiri Khan	
Bo Takhro	บ่อตะคร้อ	บร.	3	Southern	Pak Tho	Ratchaburi	
Bu Rusi	บุฤาษี	บุ.	3	Northeastern	Mueang	Surin	
Bu Yai	บุใหญ่	ให.	3	Eastern	Kaeng Khoi	Saraburi	Freight use only.
Bua Yai Junction	ชุมทางบัวใหญ่	วญ.	1	Northeastern	Bua Yai	Nakhon Ratchasima	Junction for the Northeastern Line Nong Khai Main Line and Northeastern Line Kaeng Khoi-Bua Yai Branch.
Bueng Boraphet	บึงบอระเพ็ด	เพ.	3	Northern	Mueang	Nakhon Sawan	
Bueng Phra	บึงพระ	บะ.	1	Northern	Mueang	Phitsanulok	
Bukit	บูกิต	บู.	3	Southern	Cho-airong	Narathiwat	
Bung Wai	บุ่งหวาย	งห.	3	Northeastern	Warin Chamrap	Ubon Ratchathani	
Buriram	บุรีรัมย์	รย.	1	Northeastern	Mueang	Buriram	Main station for Buriram Province.
Cha Muang	ชะม่วง	ชว.	3	Southern	Bang Saphan	Prachuap Khiri Khan	
Cha-am	ชะอำ	ชอ.	1	Southern	Cha-am	Phetchaburi	
Chachoengsao Junction	ชุมทางฉะเชิงเทรา	ฉท.	1	Eastern	Mueang	Chachoengsao	Junction for the Eastern Line Aranyaprathet Main Line and the Eastern Line Chuk Samet Main Line. Main station for Chachoengsao Province.
Chai Buri	ชัยบุรี	ไช.	Halt	Southern	Mueang	Phatthalung	
Chaiya	ไชยา	ชย.	1	Southern	Chaiya	Surat Thani	
Chakkarat	จักราช	จช.	2	Northeastern	Chakkarat	Nakhon Ratchasima	
Chalerm Kanchana	เฉลิมกาญจนา	ฉก.	Halt	Northeastern	Mueang	Sisaket	
Chana	จะนะ	จน.	2	Southern	Chana	Songkhla	
Chansen	จันเสน	จส.	2	Northern	Takhli	Nakhon Sawan	
Chanthuk	จันทึก	จท.	2	Northeastern	Pak Chong	Nakhon Ratchasima	
Charansanitwong	จรัลสนิทวงศ์	รว.	Halt	Southern	Bangkok Noi	Bangkok	
Chatturat	จัตุรัส	จต.	1	Northeastern	Chatturat	Chaiyaphum	Main station for Chaiyaphum Province.
Cha-uat	ชะอวด	ชด.	2	Southern	Cha-uat	Nakhon Si Thammarat	
Chawang	ฉวาง	ฉว.	2	Southern	Chawang	Nakhon Si Thammarat	
Chet Samian	เจ็ดเสมียน	จม.	2	Southern	Photharam	Ratchaburi	
Chiang Mai	เชียงใหม่	ชม.	1	Northern	Mueang	Chiang Mai	Main station for Chiang Mai Province.
Chiang Rak Noi	เชียงรากน้อย	ชน.	2	Northern, Northeastern	Bang Pa-in	Phra Nakhon Si Ayutthaya	
Chiang Rak	เชียงราก	ชร.	2	Northern, Northeastern	Khlong Luang	Pathum Thani	
Cho-airong	เจาะไอร้อง	จอ.	2	Southern	Cho-airong	Narathiwat	
Chitralada	จิตรลดา	จล.	Special	Northern, Northeastern, Southern	Dusit	Bangkok	Royal use only.
Chom Thong	จอมทอง	ทจ.	Halt	Maeklong	Chom Thong	Bangkok	
Chonburi	ชลบุรี	ชบ.	1	Eastern	Mueang	Chonburi	Main station for Chonburi Province.
Chong Khae	ช่องแค	ชค.	1	Northern	Takhli	Nakhon Sawan	
Chong Khaep	ช่องแคบ	อบ.	Halt	Southern	Sai Yok	Kanchanaburi	
Chong Khao	ช่องเขา	ชข.	3	Southern	Ron Phibun	Nakhon Si Thammarat	
Chong Samran	ช่องสำราญ	อช.	3	Northeastern	Thep Sathit	Chaiyaphum	
Chuk Samet	จุกเสม็ด	จเ.	1	Eastern	Sattahip	Chonburi	
Chumphon	ชุมพร	ชพ.	1	Southern	Mueang	Chumphon	Main station for Chumphon Province.
Chum Saeng	ชุมแสง	ชส.	1	Northern	Chum Saeng	Nakhon Sawan	
Den Chai	เด่นชัย	ดช.	1	Northern	Den Chai	Phrae	Main station for Phrae Province.
Don Mueang	ดอนเมือง	ดม.	1	Northern, Northeastern	Don Mueang	Bangkok	
Don Sai	ดอนทราย	ดซ.	3	Southern	Thap Sakae	Prachuap Khiri Khan	
Don Si Non	ดอนสีนนท์	ดอ.	3	Eastern	Ban Pho	Chachoengsao	
Don Thong	ดอนทอง	ดถ.	Halt	Southern	Bang Pla Ma	Suphan Buri	
Don Thup	ดอนธูป	ดธ.	3	Southern	Tha Chana	Surat Thani	
Don Ya Nang	ดอนหญ้านาง	ญา.	Halt	Northern	Phachi	Phra Nakhon Si Ayutthaya	
Dong Maku	ดงมะกุ	ดง.	3	Northern	Takhli	Nakhon Sawan	
Dong Takhop	ดงตะขบ	ดข.	3	Northern	Bang Mun Nak	Phichit	
Han Kong	หารกง	ฮก.	Halt	Southern	Pak Phayun	Phatthalung	
Han Thao	หารเทา	หท.	2	Southern	Pak Phayun	Phatthalung	
Hang Chat	ห้างฉัตร	หฉ.	3	Northern	Hang Chat	Lampang	
Hat Yai Junction	ชุมทางหาดใหญ่	หใ.	1	Southern	Hat Yai	Songkhla	Junction for the Southern Main Line and the Southern Line Padang Besar Branch. Main station for Songkhla Province.
Hin Dat	หินดาษ	ดา.	3	Northeastern	Huai Thalaeng	Nakhon Ratchasima	
Hin Kong	หินกอง	หก.	Halt	Southern	Bang Saphan	Prachuap Khiri Khan	
Hin Lap	หินลับ	หล.	3	Northeastern	Muak Lek	Saraburi	
Hin Son	หินซ้อน	หซ.	3	Northeastern	Kaeng Khoi	Saraburi	
Ho Krai	หอไกร	ไก.	3	Northern	Bang Mun Nak	Phichit	
Hua Dong	หัวดง	หด.	2	Northern	Mueang	Phichit	
Hua Hin	หัวหิน	หห.	1	Southern	Hua Hin	Prachuap Khiri Khan	
Hua Mak	หัวหมาก	หม.	1	Eastern	Suan Luang	Bangkok	
Hua Mat	หัวมาด	มั.	Halt	Southern	Lamae	Chumphon	
Hua Ngiu	หัวงิ้ว	หง.	3	Northern	Phayuha Khiri	Nakhon Sawan	
Hua Takhe	หัวตะเข้	หข.	1	Eastern	Lat Krabang	Bangkok	
Hua Wai	หัวหวาย	หว.	3	Northern	Takhli	Nakhon Sawan	
Huai Chot	ห้วยโจด	ยจ.	Halt	Eastern	Watthana Nakhon	Sa Kaeo	
Huai Dua	ห้วยเดื่อ	หอ.	Halt	Eastern	Watthana Nakhon	Sa Kaeo	
Huai Kaeo	ห้วยแก้ว	หก.	3	Northern	Ban Mi	Lopburi	
Huai Ket	ห้วยเกตุ	ยต.	3	Northern	Taphan Hin	Phichit	
Huai Khayung	ห้วยขยุง	ขย.	3	Northeastern	Warin Chamrap	Ubon Ratchathani	
Huai Khwang	ห้วยขวาง	ขว.	Halt	Southern	Sam Roi Yot	Prachuap Khiri Khan	
Huai Koeng	ห้วยเกิ้ง	ยก.	3	Northeastern	Kumphawapi	Udon Thani	
Huai Mae Ta	ห้วยแม่ต้า	วต.	Halt	Northern	Long	Phrae	
Huai Mut	ห้วยมุด	มด.	3	Southern	Ban Na San	Surat Thani	
Huai Prik	ห้วยปริก	หป.	3	Southern	Chawang	Nakhon Si Thammarat	
Huai Rahat	ห้วยระหัด	ยร.	Halt	Northeastern	Bua Yai	Nakhon Ratchasima	
Huai Rai	ห้วยไร่	หา.	3	Northern	Den Chai	Phrae	
Huai Rak Mai	ห้วยรากไม้	รไ.	Halt	Northern	Mae Mo	Lampang	
Huai Rat	ห้วยราช	หร.	2	Northeastern	Huai Rat	Buriram	
Huai Rian	ห้วยเรียน	ยเ.	Halt	Northern	Hang Chat	Lampang	
Huai Rong	ห้วยโรง	โง.	Halt	Southern	Pak Tho	Ratchaburi	
Huai Sai Nua	ห้วยทรายเหนือ	ซน.	3	Southern	Cha-am	Phetchaburi	
Huai Sai Tai	ห้วยทรายใต้	ซใ.	3	Southern	Cha-am	Phetchaburi	
Huai Sak	ห้วยสัก	ยส.	2	Southern	Bang Saphan Noi	Prachuap Khiri Khan	
Huai Sam Phat	ห้วยสามพาด	หพ.	3	Northeastern	Prachaksinlapakhom	Udon Thani	
Huai Sieo	ห้วยเสียว	ยว.	3	Northeastern	Nam Phong	Khon Kaen	
Huai Thalaeng	ห้วยแถลง	ถล.	2	Northeastern	Huai Thalaeng	Nakhon Ratchasima	
Huai Thap Than	ห้วยทับทัน	ทท.	2	Northeastern	Huai Thap Than	Sisaket	
Huai Yai Chiu	ห้วยยายจิ๋ว	จย.	3	Northeastern	Thep Sathit	Chaiyaphum	
Huai Yang	ห้วยยาง	หย.	2	Southern	Thap Sakae	Prachuap Khiri Khan	
Huai Yot	ห้วยยอด	ยอ.	2	Southern	Huai Yot	Trang	
Kabin Buri	กบินทร์บุรี	กบ.	2	Eastern	Kabin Buri	Prachinburi	
Kabin Kao	กบินทร์เก่า	กก.	Halt	Eastern	Kabin Buri	Prachinburi	
Kadae	กะแด๊ะ	กแ.	Halt	Southern	Ra-ngae	Narathiwat	
Kadon Kho	กะโดนค้อ	ดค.	3	Northeastern	Sikhoraphum	Surin	
Kaeng Khoi Junction	ชุมทางแก่งคอย	กค.	1	Northeastern, Eastern	Kaeng Khoi	Saraburi	Junction for the Northeastern Main Line, Northeastern Line Kaeng Khoi-Bua Yai Branch and Eastern Line Phra Phutthachai Branch.
Kaeng Luang	แก่งหลวง	กล.	3	Northern	Long	Phrae	
Kaeng Suea Ten	แก่งเสือเต้น	แส.	3	Northeastern	Phatthana Nikhom	Lopburi	
Kan Kheha	การเคหะ	เค.	Halt	Maeklong	Bang Bon	Bangkok	
Kanchanaburi	กาญจนบุรี	กญ.	1	Southern	Mueang	Kanchanaburi	Main station for Kanchanaburi Province.
Kantang	กันตัง	กต.	1	Southern	Kantang	Trang	
Kanthararom	กันทรารมย์	าร.	2	Northeastern	Kanthararom	Sisaket	
Kapang	กะปาง	กป.	Halt	Southern	Ratsada	Trang	
Kham Kling	คำกลิ้ง	ลค.	Halt	Northeastern	Mueang	Udon Thani	
Khan Kradai	คั่นกระได	กด.	3	Southern	Mueang	Prachuap Khiri Khan	
Khanthuli	คันธุลี	คล.	3	Southern	Tha Chana	Surat Thani	
Khao Chai Rat	เขาไชยราช	ขช.	3	Southern	Pathio	Chumphon	
Khao Chaison	เขาชัยสน	เช.	2	Southern	Khao Chaison	Phatthalung	
Khao Chi Chan Junction	ชุมทางเขาชีจรรย์	ชจ.	3	Eastern	Sattahip	Chonburi	Junction for the Eastern Line Chuk Samet Main Line and Map Ta Phut Branch.
Khao Chum Thong Junction	ชุมทางเขาชุมทอง	ชท.	3	Southern	Ron Phibun	Nakhon Si Thammarat	Junction for the Southern Main Line and Southern Line Nakhon Si Thammarat Branch,
Khao Hin Dat	เขาหินดาด	ดด.	Halt	Northeastern	Kaeng Khoi	Saraburi	
Khao Hua Khwai	เขาหัวควาย	ขค.	3	Southern	Phunphin	Surat Thani	
Khao Khok	เขาคอก	ขก.	Halt	Northeastern	Kaeng Khoi	Saraburi	
Khao Lung	เขาหลุง	ขุ.	Halt	Southern	Khiri Rat Nikhom	Surat Thani	
Khao Phanom Baek	เขาพนมแบก	ขบ.	3	Southern	Chaiya	Surat Thani	
Khao Phlu	เขาพลู	ขพ.	3	Southern	Phunphin	Surat Thani	
Khao Phlueng	เขาพลึง	ขง.	Halt	Northern	Den Chai	Phrae	
Khao Phrabat	เขาพระบาท	ขะ.	Halt	Eastern	Si Racha	Chonburi	
Khao Pip	เขาปีป	ขป.	Halt	Southern	Thung Tako	Chumphon	
Khao Pun	เขาปูน	เป.	Halt	Southern	Mueang	Kanchanaburi	
Khao Suan Kwang	เขาสวนกวาง	สง.	3	Northeastern	Khao Suan Kwang	Khon Kaen	
Khao Suan Thurian	เขาสวนทุเรียน	ขร.	3	Southern	Sawi	Chumphon	
Khao Sung	เขาสูง	ขส.	Halt	Northeastern	Kaeng Khoi	Saraburi	
Khao Tao	เขาเต่า	ขต.	3	Southern	Hua Hin	Prachuap Khiri Khan	
Khao Thamon	เขาทโมน	โม.	3	Southern	Mueang	Phetchaburi	
Khao Thong	เขาทอง	ขท.	3	Northern	Phayuha Khiri	Nakhon Sawan	
Khao Yai Ka Ta	เขายายกะตา	เย.	Halt	Northeastern	Chai Badan	Lopburi	
Khao Yoi	เขาย้อย	เข.	3	Southern	Khao Yoi	Phetchaburi	
Khet Mueang	เขตเมือง	ดเ.	Halt	Maeklong	Mueang	Samut Sakhon	
Khiri Rat Nikhom	คีรีรัฐนิคม	รค.	2	Southern	Khiri Rat Nikhom	Surat Thani	
Khlong Bang Phra	คลองบางพระ	คบ.	3	Eastern	Mueang	Chachoengsao	
Khlong Bang Tan	คลองบางตาล	บา.	2	Southern	Ban Pong	Ratchaburi	
Khlong Chak	คลองจาก	ลจ.	Halt	Maeklong	Mueang	Samut Sakhon	
Khlong Chandi	คลองจันดี	จด.	1	Southern	Chawang	Nakhon Si Thammarat	
Khlong Chang	คลองจัง	คจ.	3	Southern	Na Bon	Nakhon Si Thammarat	
Khlong Khanan Chit	คลองขนานจิตร	ขจ.	3	Northeastern	Pak Chong	Nakhon Ratchasima	
Khlong Khanan	คลองขนาน	คข.	3	Southern	Lang Suan	Chumphon	
Khlong Khut	คลองขุด	ขด.	Halt	Southern	Tha Chang	Surat Thani	
Khlong Kui	คลองกุย	อก.	Halt	Southern	Na Bon	Nakhon Si Thammarat	
Khlong Kwaeng Klan	คลองแขวงกลั่น	แข.	Halt	Eastern	Mueang	Chachoengsao	
Khlong Luang Phaeng	คลองหลวงแพ่ง	คพ.	3	Eastern	Lat Krabang	Bangkok	
Khlong Maha Sawat	คลองมหาสวัสดิ์	มว.	Halt	Southern	Phutthamonthon	Nakhon Pathom	
Khlong Maphlap	คลองมะพลับ	มป.	3	Northern	Si Nakhon	Sukhothai	
Khlong Ngae	คลองแงะ	คง.	1	Southern	Sadao	Songkhla	
Khlong Noklek	คลองนกเล็ก	ลเ.	Halt	Maeklong	Mueang	Samut Sakhon	
Khlong Nueng	คลองหนึ่ง	ลห.	Halt	Northern, Northeastern	Khlong Luang	Pathum Thani	
Khlong Phai	คลองไผ่	คผ.	3	Northeastern	Sikhio	Nakhon Ratchasima	
Khlong Phutsa	คลองพุทรา	พซ.	2	Northern, Northeastern	Bang Pa-in	Phra Nakhon Si Ayutthaya	
Khlong Pla Kot	คลองปลากด	ปก.	3	Northern	Chum Saeng	Nakhon Sawan	
Khlong Prap	คลองปราบ	ปบ.	Halt	Southern	Ban Na San	Surat Thani	
Khlong Sai	คลองทราย	คซ.	3	Southern	Mae Lan	Pattani	
Khlong Sai	คลองไทร	คไ.	3	Southern	Tha Chang	Surat Thani	
Khlong Sip Kao Junction	ชุมทางคลองสิบเก้า	สเ.	3	Eastern	Bang Nam Priao	Chachoengsao	
Khlong Sun	คลองสูญ	คู.	Halt	Southern	Wiang Sa	Surat Thani	
Khlong Ta Khot	คลองตาคต	ตค.	3	Southern	Photharam	Ratchaburi	
Khlong Tan	คลองตัน	คต.	2	Eastern	Huai Khwang	Bangkok	
Khlong Ton Sai	คลองต้นไทร	ไซ.	Halt	Maeklong	Chom Thong	Bangkok	
Khlong Udom Chonlajorn	คลองอุดมชลจร	ดจ.	Halt	Eastern	Mueang	Chachoengsao	
Khlong Wang Chang	คลองวังช้าง	คช.	3	Southern	Pathio	Chumphon	
Khlong Ya	คลองยา	ยา.	Halt	Southern	Ban Na Doem	Surat Thani	
Khlong Yan	คลองยัน	คอ.	Halt	Southern	Khiri Rat Nikhom	Surat Thani	
Khlong Yi Sip Et	คลองยี่สิบเอ็ด	เอ.	Halt	Eastern	Bang Nam Priao	Chachoengsao	
Khok Kathiam	โคกกะเทียม	คท.	3	Northern	Mueang	Lopburi	
Khok Khli	โคกคลี	คี.	3	Northeastern	Lam Sonthi	Lopburi	
Khok Khram	โคกคราม	คค.	3	Southern	Ron Phibun	Nakhon Si Thammarat	
Khok Khwai	คอกควาย	วา.	Halt	Maeklong	Mueang	Samut Sakhon	
Khok Kruat	โคกกรวด	คก.	3	Northeastern	Mueang	Nakhon Ratchasima	
Khok Makok	โคกมะกอก	กอ.	3	Eastern	Mueang	Prachinburi	
Khok Sa-at	โคกสะอาด	อา.	Halt	Northeastern	Sikhio	Nakhon Ratchasima	Reduced to halt on 17 August 2020.
Khok Sai	โคกทราย	โท.	3	Southern	Pak Phayun	Phatthalung	
Khok Salung	โคกสลุง	คุ.	2	Northeastern	Phatthana Nikhom	Lopburi	
Khok Saya	โคกสยา	โย.	Halt	Southern	Su-ngai Padi	Narathiwat	
Khok Ta Hom	โคกตาหอม	โห.	Halt	Southern	Bang Saphan	Prachuap Khiri Khan	
Khon Kaen	ขอนแก่น	ขอ.	1	Northeastern	Mueang	Khon Kaen	Main station for Khon Kaen Province.
Khuan Hin Mui	ควนหินมุ้ย	มย.	3	Southern	Lang Suan	Chumphon	
Khuan Khiam	ควนเคี่ยม	คเ.	3	Southern	Pak Phayun	Phatthalung	
Khuan Niang	ควนเนียง	เน.	2	Southern	Khuan Niang	Songkhla	
Khuan Nong Khwa	ควนหนองคว้า	คว.	3	Southern	Chulabhorn	Nakhon Si Thammarat	
Khuan Phra	ควนพระ	คะ.	Halt	Southern	Pak Phayun	Phatthalung	
Khun Tan	ขุนตาน	ขน.	2	Northern	Mae Tha	Lamphun	
Khwae Noi	แควน้อย	คน.	3	Northern	Phrom Phiram	Phitsanulok	
Klang Dong	กลางดง	าง.	2	Northeastern	Pak Chong	Nakhon Ratchasima	
Ko Maha Mongkol	เกาะมหามงคล	กม.	Halt	Southern	Sai Yok	Kanchanaburi	
Ko Saba	เกาะสะบ้า	กส.	2	Southern	Thepha	Songkhla	
Krabiat	กระเบียด	เบ.	3	Southern	Chawang	Nakhon Si Thammarat	
Krasang	กระสัง	ะส.	2	Northeastern	Krasang	Buriram	
Krung Thep Aphiwat Central Terminal	กรุงเทพอภิวัฒน์	กภ.	Special Station	Northern, Northeastern, Southern	Bang Sue	Bangkok	Current central railway station of Bangkok. Official opening for long-distance trains on 19 January 2023.
Kui Buri	กุยบุรี	กย.	2	Southern	Kui Buri	Prachuap Khiri Khan	
Kumphawapi	กุมภวาปี	วป.	1	Northeastern	Kumphawapi	Udon Thani	
Kut Chik	กุดจิก	กจ.	3	Northeastern	Sung Noen	Nakhon Ratchasima	
Lad Yai	ลาดใหญ่	ลญ.	Halt	Maeklong	Mueang	Samut Songkhram	
Laem Chabang	แหลมฉบัง	ฉบ.	1	Eastern	Si Racha	Chonburi	Freight use only.
Laem Tanot	แหลมโตนด	โน.	2	Southern	Khuan Khanun	Phatthalung	
Lak Chang	หลักช้าง	หช.	3	Southern	Chang Klang	Nakhon Si Thammarat	
Lalo	ลาโละ	ลล.	3	Southern	Rueso	Narathiwat	
Lam Chi	ลำชี	ลช.	2	Northeastern	Mueang	Surin	
Lam Narai	ลำนารายณ์	ลา.	1	Northeastern	Chai Badan	Lopburi	
Lam Plai Mat	ลำปลายมาศ	ลำ.	1	Northeastern	Lam Plai Mat	Buriram	
Lamae	ละแม	แม.	2	Southern	Lamae	Chumphon	
Lamphun	ลำพูน	ลพ.	1	Northern	Mueang	Lamphun	Main station for Lamphun Province.
Lang Suan	หลังสวน	งส.	1	Southern	Lang Suan	Chumphon	
Lat Bua Khao	ลาดบัวขาว	ลข.	3	Northeastern	Sikhio	Nakhon Ratchasima	
Lat Krabang	ลาดกระบัง	ะบ.	2	Eastern	Lat Krabang	Bangkok	
Lopburi	ลพบุรี	ลบ.	1	Northern	Mueang	Lopburi	Main station for Lopburi Province.
Luk Kae	ลูกแก	ลแ.	2	Southern	Tha Maka	Kanchanaburi	
Lumsum	ลุ่มสุ่ม	ลุ.	Halt	Southern	Sai Yok	Kanchanaburi	
Ma Lai Maen	มาลัยแมน	-	Halt	Southern	Mueang	Suphan Buri	
Mae Chang	แม่จาง	มจ.	3	Northern	Mae Mo	Lampang	
Mae Mo	แม่เมาะ	มม.	2	Northern	Mae Mo	Lampang	
Mae Nam	แม่น้ำ	มน.	1	Eastern	Yan Nawa	Bangkok	Freight use only.
Mae Phuak	แม่พวก	มพ.	Halt	Northern	Den Chai	Phrae	
Mae Tan Noi	แม่ตานน้อย	มต.	3	Northern	Hang Chat	Lampang	
Mae Tha	แม่ทะ	มท.	3	Northern	Mae Tha	Lampang	
Mae Thiap	แม่เทียบ	แท.	3	Northern	Bang Krathum	Phitsanulok	
Maeklong	แม่กลอง	แอ.	3	Maeklong	Mueang	Samut Songkhram	Main station for Samut Songkhram Province.
Mahachai	มหาชัย	ชั.	1	Maeklong	Mueang	Samut Sakhon	Main station for Samut Sakhon Province.
Mai Kaen	ไม้แก่น	ไม.	3	Southern	Raman	Yala	
Makkasan	มักกะสัน	มส.	1	Eastern	Ratchathewi	Bangkok	Not officially a junction, but serves as a junction for the Eastern Main Line and Eastern Line Mae Nam Branch.
Maluan	มะลวน	ลว.	2	Southern	Phunphin	Surat Thani	
Mamuang Song Ton	มะม่วงสองต้น	สต.	Halt	Southern	Mueang	Nakhon Si Thammarat	
Map Ammarit	มาบอำมฤต	มร.	2	Southern	Pathio	Chumphon	
Map Kabao	มาบกะเบา	มบ.	2	Northeastern	Kaeng Khoi	Saraburi	
Map Phra Chan	มาบพระจันทร์	บจ.	3	Northern, Northeastern	Uthai	Phra Nakhon Si Ayutthaya	
Map Ta Phut	มาบตะพุด	าพ.	2	Eastern	Mueang	Rayong	Freight use only.
Maruebo	มะรือโบ	โบ.	2	Southern	Ra-ngae	Narathiwat	
Muak Lek	มวกเหล็ก	มล.	1	Northeastern	Muak Lek	Saraburi	
Mueang Khong	เมืองคง	งค.	1	Northeastern	Khong	Nakhon Ratchasima	
Mueang Phon	เมืองพล	อล.	1	Northeastern	Phon	Khon Kaen	
Mueang Thi	เมืองที	อท.	3	Northeastern	Mueang	Surin	
Na Bon	นาบอน	าอ.	2	Southern	Na Bon	Nakhon Si Thammarat	
Na Cha-ang	นาชะอัง	ชง.	3	Southern	Mueang	Chumphon	
Na Kann	นากาญจน์	นญ.	Halt	Southern	Mueang	Kanchanaburi	
Na Muang	นาม่วง	มง.	2	Southern	Na Mom	Songkhla	
Na Phak Khuang	นาผักขวง	ผข.	3	Southern	Bang Saphan	Prachuap Khiri Khan	
Na Phu	นาพู่	ภู.	3	Northeastern	Phen	Udon Thani	
Na Pradu	นาประดู่	าด.	2	Southern	Khok Pho	Pattani	
Na Prue	นาปรือ	ปร.	Halt	Southern	Mueang	Phatthalung	
Na San	นาสาร	นส.	1	Southern	Ban Na San	Surat Thani	
Na Tha	นาทา	ยน.	3	Northeastern	Mueang	Nong Khai	
Nakhon Chai Si	นครชัยศรี	รช.	2	Southern	Nakhon Chai Si	Nakhon Pathom	
Nakhon Chum	นครชุมน์	นช.	3	Southern	Photharam	Ratchaburi	
Nakhon Lampang	นครลำปาง	ลป.	1	Northern	Mueang	Lampang	Main station for Lampang Province.
Nakhon Pathom	นครปฐม	คฐ.	1	Southern	Mueang	Nakhon Pathom	Main station for Nakhon Pathom Province.
Nakhon Ratchasima	นครราชสีมา	รส.	1	Northeastern	Mueang	Nakhon Ratchasima	Main station for Nakhon Ratchasima Province.
Nakhon Sawan	นครสวรรค์	นว.	1	Northern	Mueang	Nakhon Sawan	Main station for Nakhon Sawan Province.
Nakhon Si Thammarat	นครศรีธรรมราช	ธำ.	1	Southern	Mueang	Nakhon Si Thammarat	Main station for Nakhon Si Thammarat Province.
Nam Phong	น้ำพอง	อง.	2	Northeastern	Nam Phong	Khon Kaen	
Nam Tok	น้ำตก	าต.	2	Southern	Sai Yok	Kanchanaburi	
Nam Tok Sai Yok Noi	น้ำตกไทรโยคน้อย	-	Halt	Southern	Sai Yok	Kanchanaburi	Excursion Train use only.
Nava Nakhon	นวนคร	วะ.	Halt	Northern, Northeastern	Khlong Luang	Pathum Thani	
Nikhom Rotfai Mahachai	นิคมรถไฟมหาชัย	-	Halt	Maeklong	Mueang	Samut Sakhon	
Noen Makok	เนินมะกอก	มก.	3	Northern	Phayuha Khiri	Nakhon Sawan	
Noen Sawat	เนินสวัสดิ์	เว.	Halt	Northeastern	Bua Yai	Nakhon Ratchasima	
Noen Thua Paep	เนินถั่วแปป	ถป.	Halt	Northeastern	Non Sung	Nakhon Ratchasima	
Non Khro	โนนคร้อ	น้.	Halt	Northeastern	Chatturat	Chaiyaphum	
Non Phayom	โนนพยอม	พอ.	3	Northeastern	Nam Phong	Khon Kaen	
Non Sa-at	โนนสะอาด	โอ.	3	Northeastern	Non Sa-at	Udon Thani	
Non Sung	โนนสูง	นโ.	1	Northeastern	Non Sung	Nakhon Ratchasima	
Non Thong Lang	โนนทองหลาง	นท.	3	Northeastern	Bua Yai	Nakhon Ratchasima	
Nong Bua Lai	หนองบัวลาย	งบ.	3	Northeastern	Bua Lai	Nakhon Ratchasima	
Nong Bua Junction	ชุมทางหนองบัว	นบ.	3	Northeastern, Eastern	Mueang	Saraburi	Junction for the Northeastern Main Line and the Eastern Line Phra Phutthachai Branch.
Nong Chim	หนองฉิม	ฉม.	3	Northeastern	Noen Sa-nga	Chaiyaphum	
Nong Chok	หนองจอก	หจ.	2	Southern	Tha Yang	Phetchaburi	
Nong Don	หนองโดน	โด.	2	Northern	Nong Don	Saraburi	
Nong Hin	หนองหิน	นห.	2	Southern	Mueang	Prachuap Khiri Khan	
Nong Jik	หนองจิก	อจ.	Halt	Southern	Cha-uat	Nakhon Si Thammarat	
Nong Kae	หนองแก	นอ.	3	Southern	Hua Hin	Prachuap Khiri Khan	
Nong Khaen	หนองแคน	หค.	Halt	Northeastern	Uthumphon Phisai	Sisaket	
Nong Khai	หนองคาย	นค.	1	Northeastern	Mueang	Nong Khai	Main station for Nong Khai Province. Border station with Laos (Thanaleng).
Nong Khang	หนองคาง	อค.	3	Southern	Sam Roi Yot	Prachuap Khiri Khan	
Nong Khon Kwang	หนองขอนกว้าง	ออ.	3	Northeastern	Mueang	Udon Thani	
Nong Krachap	หนองกระจับ	อะ.	Halt	Eastern	Mueang	Prachinburi	
Nong Krathing	หนองกระทิง	ทง.	3	Northeastern	Huai Thalaeng	Nakhon Ratchasima	
Nong Kuai	หนองกวย	นก.	3	Northeastern	Phachi	Phra Nakhon Si Ayutthaya	
Nong Lom	หนองหล่ม	งล.	3	Northern	Mueang	Lamphun	
Nong Maeo	หนองแมว	นง.	3	Northeastern	Non Sung	Nakhon Ratchasima	
Nong Mai Luang	หนองไม้เหลือง	นม.	3	Southern	Ban Lat	Phetchaburi	
Nong Makhuea	หนองมะเขือ	งอ.	3	Northeastern	Phon	Khon Kaen	
Nong Manorom	หนองมโนรมย์	มโ.	3	Northeastern	Chakkarat	Nakhon Ratchasima	
Nong Mongkhon	หนองมงคล	หน.	Halt	Southern	Bang Saphan	Prachuap Khiri Khan	
Nong Nam Khao	หนองน้ำขาว	งข.	Halt	Eastern	Ban Sang	Prachinburi	
Nong Nam Khun	หนองน้ำขุ่น	นข.	3	Northeastern	Sikhio	Nakhon Ratchasima	
Nong Nian	หนองเนียน	งน.	Halt	Southern	Mueang	Chumphon	
Nong Phluang	หนองพลวง	งว.	3	Northeastern	Bua Yai	Nakhon Ratchasima	
Nong Pho	หนองโพ	นพ.	3	Northern	Takhli	Nakhon Sawan	
Nong Pla Lai	หนองปลาไหล	ปล.	3	Southern	Khao Yoi	Phetchaburi	
Nong Pladuk Junction	ชุมทางหนองปลาดุก	ปด.	2	Southern	Ban Pong	Ratchaburi	Junction for the Southern Main Line, Southern Line Suphan Buri Branch and the Southern Line Nam Tok Branch (Burma Railway).
Nong Saeng	หนองแซง	นซ.	2	Northeastern	Nong Saeng	Saraburi	
Nong Saeng	หนองแสง	หแ.	Halt	Eastern	Prachantakham	Prachinburi	
Nong Sai Khao	หนองทรายขาว	ซข.	3	Northern	Ban Mi	Lopburi	
Nong Sala	หนองศาลา	งา.	3	Southern	Cha-am	Phetchaburi	
Nong Sang	หนองสัง	อส.	3	Eastern	Kabin Buri	Prachinburi	
Nong Sida	หนองสีดา	นด.	3	Northeastern	Nong Saeng	Saraburi	
Nong Suea	หนองเสือ	บส.	Halt	Southern	Tha Muang	Kanchanaburi	
Nong Takai	หนองตะไก้	งต.	3	Northeastern	Mueang	Udon Thani	
Nong Tao	หนองเต่า	นต.	3	Northern	Ban Mi	Lopburi	
Nong Teng	หนองเต็ง	เต.	3	Northeastern	Krasang	Buriram	
Nong Tom	หนองตม	หต.	2	Northern	Phrom Phiram	Phitsanulok	
Nong Waeng	หนองแวง	อว.	3	Northeastern	Mueang	Sisaket	
Nong Wiwat	หนองวิวัฒน์	วิ.	3	Northern	Tha Ruea	Phra Nakhon Si Ayutthaya	
Nong Wua Thao	หนองวัวเฒ่า	วถ.	3	Northern	Mueang	Lampang	
Ongkharak	องครักษ์	อษ.	3	Eastern	Ongkharak	Nakhon Nayok	Freight use only.
Pa Phai	ป่าไผ่	ปผ.	3	Southern	Ra-ngae	Narathiwat	
Pa Rai	ป่าไร่	ปไ.	Halt	Southern	Khok Pho	Pattani	
Pa Sak Jolasid Dam	เขื่อนป่าสักชลสิทธิ์	ขธ.	Halt	Northeastern	Phatthana Nikhom	Lopburi	
Pa Sao	ป่าเส้า	ปส.	3	Northern	Mueang	Lamphun	
Padang Besar (Thai)	ปาดังเบซาร์ (ไทย)	ปซ.2	1	Southern	Sadao	Songkhla	Border Station with Malaysia (Padang Besar). Immigration facilities in Malaysian station.
Paet Riu	แปดริ้ว	แร.	Halt	Eastern	Mueang	Chachoengsao	
Pak Chong	ปากช่อง	ปช.	1	Northeastern	Pak Chong	Nakhon Ratchasima	
Pak Khlong	ปากคลอง	ปค.	2	Southern	Khuan Khanun	Phatthalung	
Pak Nam Pho	ปากน้ำโพ	ปพ.	1	Northern	Mueang	Nakhon Sawan	
Pak Pan	ปากปาน	ปา.	3	Northern	Den Chai	Phrae	
Pak Phraek	ปากแพรก	ปแ.	Halt	Southern	Tha Muang	Kanchanaburi	
Pak Tako	ปากตะโก	ตก.	2	Southern	Thung Tako	Chumphon	
Pak Tho	ปากท่อ	ปท.	2	Southern	Pak Tho	Ratchaburi	
Pang Asok	ปางอโศก	โศ.	2	Northeastern	Pak Chong	Nakhon Ratchasima	
Pang Muang	ปางม่วง	ปม.	3	Northern	Hang Chat	Lampang	
Pang Puai	ปางป๋วย	ปย.	3	Northern	Mae Mo	Lampang	
Pang Ton Phueng	ปางต้นผึ้ง	ปต.	3	Northern	Mueang	Uttaradit	
Pathio	ปะทิว	ะท.	1	Southern	Pathio	Chumphon	
Pattani (Khok Pho)	ปัตตานี (โคกโพธิ์)	นี.	1	Southern	Khok Pho	Pattani	Main station for Pattani Province.
Pattaya Floating Market	ตลาดน้ำ 4 ภาค	ตภ.	Halt	Eastern	Bang Lamung	Chonburi	
Pattaya	พัทยา	พา.	2	Eastern	Bang Lamung	Chonburi	
Pattaya Tai	พัทยาใต้	ใต.	Halt	Eastern	Bang Lamung	Chonburi	
Pha Khan	ผาคัน	ผน.	3	Northern	Long	Phrae	
Pha Kho	ผาคอ	ผค.	Halt	Northern	Long	Phrae	
Pha Sadet	ผาเสด็จ	ผด.	2	Northeastern	Kaeng Khoi	Saraburi	
Phaendin Thong	แผ่นดินทอง	แง.	3	Northeastern	Chai Badan	Lopburi	
Phai Yai	ไผ่ใหญ่	ผญ.	Halt	Northern	Ban Mi	Lopburi	
Phan Thong	พานทอง	งท.	3	Eastern	Phan Thong	Chonburi	
Phatthalung	พัทลุง	พท.	1	Southern	Mueang	Phatthalung	Main station for Phatthalung Province.
Phaya Thai	พญาไท	ญท.	Halt	Eastern	Ratchathewi	Bangkok	
Phetchaburi	เพชรบุรี	พบ.	1	Southern	Mueang	Phetchaburi	Main station for Phetchaburi Province.
Phichai	พิชัย	พย.	1	Northern	Phichai	Uttaradit	
Phichit	พิจิตร	พจ.	1	Northern	Mueang	Phichit	Main station for Phichit Province.
Phitsanulok	พิษณุโลก	พล.	1	Northern	Mueang	Phitsanulok	Main station for Phitsanulok Province.
Pho Than Klai Wachasit	พ่อท่านคล้ายวาจาสิทธิ์	วจ.	Halt	Southern	Chang Klang	Nakhon Si Thammarat	
Phon Songkhram	พลสงคราม	พค.	3	Northeastern	Non Sung	Nakhon Ratchasima	
Phon Thong	โพนทอง	โพ.	2	Northern	Takhli	Nakhon Sawan	
Photharam	โพธาราม	พร.	1	Southern	Photharam	Ratchaburi	
Phra Chom Klao	พระจอมเกล้า	พม.	Halt	Eastern	Lat Krabang	Bangkok	
Phra Kaeo	พระแก้ว	พก.	3	Northern, Northeastern	Phachi	Phra Nakhon Si Ayutthaya	
Phra Prong	พระปรง	พป.	Halt	Eastern	Kabin Buri	Prachinburi	
Phrom Daen	พรมแดน	พแ.	Halt	Maeklong	Mueang	Samut Sakhon	Located on the border between Mueang Samut Sakhon District, Samut Sakhon Province and Bang Khun Thian District, Bangkok
Phrom Phiram	พรหมพิราม	พห.	2	Northern	Phrom Phiram	Phitsanulok	
Phrong Akat	โพรงอากาศ	โก.	Halt	Eastern	Bang Nam Priao	Chachoengsao	
Phrong Maduea	โพรงมะเดื่อ	พด.	2	Southern	Mueang	Nakhon Pathom	
Phruphi	พรุพี	พพ.	2	Southern	Ban Na San	Surat Thani	
Phu Khao Lat	ภูเขาลาด	ขล.	3	Northeastern	Mueang	Nakhon Ratchasima	
Phuttamonthon Sai 2	พุทธมณฑลสาย 2	ทล.	Halt	Southern	Thawi Watthana	Bangkok	
Prachantakham	ประจันตคาม	จค.	2	Eastern	Prachantakham	Prachinburi	
Prachinburi	ปราจีนบุรี	ปจ.	1	Eastern	Mueang	Prachinburi	Main station for Prachinburi Province.
Prachuap Khiri Khan	ประจวบคีรีขันธ์	จข.	1	Southern	Mueang	Prachuap Khiri Khan	Main station for Prachuap Khiri Khan Province.
Pradiphat	ประดิพัทธ์	ปิ.	Halt	Northern, Northeastern, Southern	Phaya Thai	Bangkok	
Pran Buri	ปราณบุรี	ปน.	1	Southern	Pran Buri	Prachuap Khiri Khan	
Preng	เปรง	คป.	3	Eastern	Mueang	Chachoengsao	
Rai Kled Dao	ไร่เกล็ดดาว	รล.	Halt	Northern	Den Chai	Phrae	
Rai Oi	ไร่อ้อย	รอ.	3	Northern	Phichai	Uttaradit	
Raman	รามัน	รั.	2	Southern	Raman	Yala	
Ramathibodi Hospital	โรงพยาบาลรามาธิบดี	รธ.	Halt	Northern, Northeastern, Southern	Ratchathewi	Bangkok	
Rang Pho	รางโพธิ์	รโ.	2	Maeklong	Bang Bon	Bangkok	
Rang Sakae	รางสะแก	รแ.	Halt	Maeklong	Bang Bon	Bangkok	Exists only on paper. No visible station structure or signage.
Rangsit	รังสิต	รต.	1	Northern, Northeastern	Thanyaburi	Pathum Thani	Main station for Pathum Thani Province.
Ratchaburi	ราชบุรี	รร.	1	Southern	Mueang	Ratchaburi	Main station for Ratchaburi Province.
Ron Phibun	ร่อนพิบูลย์	รบ.	2	Southern	Ron Phibun	Nakhon Si Thammarat	
Rong Rien Chansen	โรงเรียนจันเสน	รจ.	Halt	Northern	Takhli	Nakhon Sawan	
Rueso	รือเสาะ	สะ.	2	Southern	Rueso	Narathiwat	
Sa Kaeo Provincial Office	ศูนย์ราชการจังหวัดสระแก้ว	ศก.	Halt	Eastern	Mueang	Sa Kaeo	
Sa Kaeo	สระแก้ว	ะก.	2	Eastern	Mueang	Sa Kaeo	Main station for Sa Kaeo Province.
Sa Kosi Narai	สระโกสินารายณ์	สโ.	2	Southern	Ban Pong	Ratchaburi	
Saeng Daet	แสงแดด	สด.	3	Southern	Mueang	Chumphon	
Sai Yai	ใสใหญ่	สใ.	3	Southern	Thung Song	Nakhon Si Thammarat	
Sala Din	ศาลาดิน	ดิ.	Halt	Northeastern	Bua Lai	Nakhon Ratchasima	
Sala Lamduan	ศาลาลำดวน	ลด.	Halt	Eastern	Mueang	Sa Kaeo	
Sala Mae Tha	ศาลาแม่ทา	ลท.	3	Northern	Mae Tha	Lamphun	
Sala Pha Lat	ศาลาผาลาด	ผล.	3	Northern	Mae Tha	Lampang	
Sala Thammasop	ศาลาธรรมสพน์	ทพ.	2	Southern	Thawi Watthana	Bangkok	
Salaya	ศาลายา	ลย.	1	Southern	Phutthamonthon	Nakhon Pathom	
Sam Krathai	สามกระทาย	สท.	3	Southern	Kui Buri	Prachuap Khiri Khan	
Sam Roi Yot	สามร้อยยอด	สย.	2	Southern	Sam Roi Yot	Prachuap Khiri Khan	
Sam Sen	สามเสน	สส.	1	Northern, Northeastern, Southern	Dusit	Bangkok	
Sam Yaek	สามแยก	แย.	Halt	Maeklong	Bang Bon	Bangkok	
Samran	สำราญ	าญ.	2	Northeastern	Mueang	Khon Kaen	
Samrong Thap	สำโรงทาบ	สบ.	2	Northeastern	Samrong Thap	Surin	
Sanam Chandra Palace	พระราชวังสนามจันทร์	สจ.	Halt	Southern	Mueang	Nakhon Pathom	
Sap Muang	ซับม่วง	ซม.	3	Northeastern	Pak Chong	Nakhon Ratchasima	
Saphan Chulalongkorn	สะพานจุฬาลงกรณ์	จา.	Halt	Southern	Mueang	Ratchaburi	
Saphan Khwae Yai	สะพานแควใหญ่	แค.	Halt	Southern	Mueang	Kanchanaburi	
Saphan Tham Krasae	สะพานถ้ำกระแซ	แซ.	Halt	Southern	Sai Yok	Kanchanaburi	
Saphli	สะพลี	สี.	3	Southern	Pathio	Chumphon	
Saraburi	สระบุรี	ะร.	1	Northeastern	Mueang	Saraburi	Main station for Saraburi Province
Saraphi	สารภี	ภี.	3	Northern	Saraphi	Chiang Mai	
Sawankhalok	สวรรคโลก	สว.	3	Northern	Sawankhalok	Sukhothai	Main station for Sukhothai Province.
Sawi	สวี	ะว.	1	Southern	Sawi	Chumphon	
Si Racha Junction	ชุมทางศรีราชา	ศช.	1	Eastern	Si Racha	Chonburi	Junction for Eastern Line Ban Phlu Ta Luang Line and Eastern Line Laem Chabang Branch.
Sikhio	สีคิ้ว	สค.	2	Northeastern	Sikhio	Nakhon Ratchasima	
Sikhoraphum	ศีขรภูมิ	รภ.	1	Northeastern	Sikhoraphum	Surin	
Sila At	ศิลาอาสน์	ศล.	1	Northern	Mueang	Uttaradit	
Sisaket	ศรีสะเกษ	เก.	1	Northeastern	Mueang	Sisaket	Main station for Sisaket Province.
Soi Wat Lan Boon	ซอยวัดลานบุญ	ซว.	Halt	Eastern	Lat Krabang	Bangkok	
Sri Samran	ศรีสำราญ	สญ.	Halt	Southern	Song Phi Nong	Suphan Buri	
Suan Nong Nuch	สวนนงนุช	นุ.	Halt	Eastern	Sattahip	Chonburi	
Suan Son Pradiphat	สวนสนประดิพัทธ์	สป.	Halt	Southern	Hua Hin	Prachuap Khiri Khan	Will become a railway station.
Sukhumvit 71	สุขุมวิท 71	วท.	Halt	Eastern	Suan Luang	Bangkok	
Sung Noen	สูงเนิน	สน.	2	Northeastern	Sung Noen	Nakhon Ratchasima	
Su-ngai Kolok	สุไหงโก-ลก	โล.	1	Southern	Su-ngai Kolok	Narathiwat	Border Station with Malaysia (Rantau Panjang). Tracks connected but rail border closed.
Su-ngai Padi	สุไหงปาดี	งด.	1	Southern	Su-ngai Padi	Narathiwat	
Suphan Buri	สุพรรณบุรี	สพ.	2	Southern	Mueang	Suphan Buri	Main station for Suphan Buri Province.
Suranarai	สุรนารายณ์	ะน.	3	Northeastern	Chai Badan	Lopburi	
Surat Thani	สุราษฎร์ธานี	รท.	1	Southern	Phunphin	Surat Thani	Main station for Surat Thani Province.
Surin	สุรินทร์	สร.	1	Northeastern	Mueang	Surin	Main station for Surin Province.
Ta Paet	ตาแปด	ตป.	2	Southern	Thepha	Songkhla	
Talat Lam Narai	ตลาดลำนารายณ์	รน.	Halt	Northeastern	Chai Badan	Lopburi	
Talat Phlu	ตลาดพลู	ลู.	2	Maeklong	Thon Buri	Bangkok	
Taling Chan Junction	ชุมทางตลิ่งชัน	ตช.	1	Southern	Taling Chan	Bangkok	Junction for Southern Main Line and Southern Line Bang Sue-Taling Chan Link.
Tanyong Mat	ตันหยงมัส	ยม.	1	Southern	Ra-ngae	Narathiwat	Main station for Narathiwat Province.
Taphan Hin	ตะพานหิน	ตห.	1	Northern	Taphan Hin	Phichit	
Tase	ตาเซะ	ตซ.	3	Southern	Mueang	Yala	
Tha Chalaep	ท่าแฉลบ	ฉล.	2	Southern	Nakhon Chai Si	Nakhon Pathom	
Tha Chalom	ท่าฉลอม	ฉอ.	Halt	Maeklong	Mueang	Samut Sakhon	
Tha Chalom City Hospital	โรงพยาบาลนครท่าฉลอม	-	Halt	Maeklong	Mueang	Samut Sakhon	Opened November 2021.
Tha Chana	ท่าชนะ	นะ.	2	Southern	Tha Chana	Surat Thani	
Tha Chang	ท่าช้าง	ชา.	3	Northeastern	Chaloem Phra Kiat	Nakhon Ratchasima	
Tha Chang	ท่าฉาง	ทฉ.	2	Southern	Tha Chang	Surat Thani	Spelt "Tha Shang" on station signs
Tha Chomphu	ทาชมภู	าช.	3	Northern	Mae Tha	Lamphun	
Tha Kasem	ท่าเกษม	ทเ.	Halt	Eastern	Mueang	Sa Kaeo	
Tha Khae	ท่าแค	ทแ.	3	Northern	Mueang	Lopburi	
Tha Kilen	ท่ากิเลน	กน.	2	Southern	Sai Yok	Kanchanaburi	
Tha Lo	ท่าฬ่อ	ทฬ.	3	Northern	Mueang	Phichit	
Tha Maenglak	ท่าแมงลัก	งก.	3	Southern	Thepha	Songkhla	
Tha Muang	ท่าม่วง	าม.	3	Southern	Tha Muang	Kanchanaburi	Serves as an Inland Container Depot (ICD)
Tha Phra	ท่าพระ	พะ.	3	Northeastern	Mueang	Khon Kaen	
Tha Ruea Noi	ท่าเรือน้อย	ทน.	2	Southern	Tha Maka	Kanchanaburi	
Tha Ruea	ท่าเรือ	ทร.	1	Northern	Tha Ruea	Phra Nakhon Si Ayutthaya	
Tha Sak	ท่าสัก	าส.	2	Northern	Phichai	Uttaradit	
Tha Sao	ท่าเสา	เส.	Halt	Northern	Mueang	Uttaradit	
Tha Ta Suea	ท่าตาเสือ	ตส.	Halt	Southern	Sai Yok	Kanchanaburi	
Tha Thong	ท่าทอง	ทอ.	Halt	Southern	Thung Tako	Chumphon	
Thale Wa	ทะเลหว้า	ทห.	Halt	Northern	Takhli	Nakhon Sawan	
Thamen Chai	ทะเมนชัย	มช.	2	Northeastern	Lam Plai Mat	Buriram	
Thammasat University	มหาวิทยาลัยธรรมศาสตร์ ศูนย์รังสิต	ธส.	Halt	Northern, Northeastern	Khlong Luang	Pathum Thani	
Than Pho	ทานพอ	ทา.	2	Southern	Chawang	Nakhon Si Thammarat	
Thanon Chira Junction	ชุมทางถนนจิระ	จร.	1	Northeastern	Mueang	Nakhon Ratchasima	Junction for Northeastern Line Ubon Ratchathani Main Line and Northeastern Line Nong Khai Main Line.
Thanon Songpol	ถนนทรงพล	ซง.	Halt	Southern	Ban Pong	Ratchaburi	
Thap Krit	ทับกฤช	ทก.	2	Northern	Chum Saeng	Nakhon Sawan	
Thap Sakae	ทับสะแก	สก.	3	Southern	Thap Sakae	Prachuap Khiri Khan	
Thepha	เทพา	เท.	2	Southern	Thepha	Songkhla	
Thi Wang	ที่วัง	ทว.	3	Southern	Thung Song	Nakhon Si Thammarat	
Thon Buri	ธนบุรี	ธบ.	1	Southern	Bangkok Noi	Bangkok	
Thung Bua	ทุ่งบัว	วบ.	Halt	Southern	Kamphaeng Saen	Nakhon Pathom	
Thung Kha	ทุ่งคา	ทค.	3	Southern	Mueang	Chumphon	
Thung Mamao	ทุ่งมะเม่า	มเ.	3	Southern	Mueang	Prachuap Khiri Khan	
Thung Pradu	ทุ่งประดู่	ทด.	1	Southern	Thap Sakae	Prachuap Khiri Khan	
Thung Si Thong	ทุ่งสีทอง	ที.	Halt	Maeklong	Mueang	Samut Sakhon	
Thung Song Junction	ชุมทางทุ่งสง	ทส.	1	Southern	Thung Song	Nakhon Si Thammarat	Junction for the Southern Main Line and Southern Line Kantang Branch.
Thung Thong	ทุ่งทอง	ทุ.	Halt	Southern	Tha Muang	Kanchanaburi	
To Deng	โต๊ะเด็ง	ตด.	3	Southern	Su-ngai Padi	Narathiwat	
Ton Samrong	ต้นสำโรง	โร.	2	Southern	Mueang	Nakhon Pathom	
Trang	ตรัง	ตร.	1	Southern	Mueang	Trang	Main station for Trang Province.
Tron	ตรอน	ตอ.	1	Northern	Tron	Uttaradit	
Ubon Ratchathani	อุบลราชธานี	อน.	1	Northeastern	Warin Chamrap	Ubon Ratchathani	Main station for Ubon Ratchathani Province.
Udon Thani	อุดรธานี	รด.	1	Northeastern	Mueang	Udon Thani	Main station for Udon Thani Province.
Urupong	อุรุพงษ์	รุ.	Halt	Eastern	Ratchathewi	Bangkok	
U Taphao	อู่ตะเภา	อต.	1	Eastern	Sattahip	Chonburi	
Uthumphon Phisai	อุทุมพรพิสัย	อุ.	1	Northeastern	Uthumphon Phisai	Sisaket	
Uttaradit	อุตรดิตถ์	อด.	1	Northern	Mueang	Uttaradit	Main station for Uttaradit Province.
Vajiravudh Camp	ค่ายวชิราวุธ	-	Special	Eastern	Si Racha	Chonburi	Scouts use only
Wang Duan	วังด้วน	วด.	3	Southern	Mueang	Prachuap Khiri Khan	
Wang Ka-am	วังกะอาม	วอ.	Halt	Northeastern	Bamnet Narong	Chaiyaphum	
Wang Kaphi	วังกะพี้	วก.	3	Northern	Mueang	Uttaradit	
Wang Krang	วังกร่าง	กา.	3	Northern	Bang Mun Nak	Phichit	
Wang Krot	วังกรด	วร.	2	Northern	Mueang	Phichit	
Wang Lan	วังลาน	วน.	Halt	Southern	Mueang	Kanchanaburi	
Wang Pho	วังโพ	วง.	2	Southern	Sai Yok	Kanchanaburi	
Wang Phong	วังก์พง	วพ.	2	Southern	Pran Buri	Prachuap Khiri Khan	
Wang Sing	วังสิงห์	วห.	Halt	Southern	Sai Yok	Kanchanaburi	
Wang Takhian	วังตะเคียน	วเ.	Halt	Southern	Mueang	Kanchanaburi	
Wang Wua	วังวัว	วว.	Halt	Southern	Phra Phrom	Nakhon Si Thammarat	
Wang Yai	วังใหญ่	วใ.	Halt	Southern	Sai Yok	Kanchanaburi	
Wang Yen	วังเย็น	วย.	2	Southern	Mueang	Kanchanaburi	
Wat Chang Hai	วัดช้างให้	ชห.	2	Southern	Khok Pho	Pattani	
Wat Khuan Mit	วัดควนมีด	วม.	3	Southern	Chana	Songkhla	
Wat Khuan Phayer	วัดควนเผยอ	วผ.	Halt	Southern	Pak Phayun	Phatthalung	
Wat Ngiu Rai	วัดงิ้วราย	งร.	2	Southern	Nakhon Chai Si	Nakhon Pathom	
Wat Sai	วัดไทร	วซ.	Halt	Maeklong	Chom Thong	Bangkok	
Wat Sing	วัดสิงห์	สิ.	3	Maeklong	Chom Thong	Bangkok	
Wat Suwan	วัดสุวรรณ	สุ.	2	Southern	Phutthamonthon	Nakhon Pathom	
Watthana Nakhon	วัฒนานคร	วค.	3	Eastern	Watthana Nakhon	Sa Kaeo	
Whagor	หว้ากอ	ห้.	Halt	Southern	Mueang	Prachuap Khiri Khan	
Wihan Daeng	วิหารแดง	แว.	3	Eastern	Wihan Daeng	Saraburi	Freight use only.
Wisai	วิสัย	ไส.	3	Southern	Mueang	Chumphon	
Wongwian Yai	วงเวียนใหญ่	งญ.	1	Maeklong	Thon Buri	Bangkok	
Wutthakat	วุฒากาศ	-	Halt	Maeklong	Thon Buri	Bangkok	
Yala	ยะลา	ยล.	1	Southern	Mueang	Yala	Main station for Yala Province.
Yanasangwararam	ญาณสังวราราม	ญส.	3	Eastern	Sattahip	Chonburi	
Yommarat	ยมราช	ยช.	Halt	Northern, Northeastern, Southern	Ratchathewi	Bangkok	
Yothaka	โยทะกา	ยท.	3	Eastern	Ban Sang	Prachinburi	

== Closed Railway Stations and Halts ==
The following table lists all closed railway stations in Thailand as of September 2021 in English alphabetical order. The list does not include stations of the Burma Railway Nam Tok Sai Yok Noi-Thanbyuzayat which was demolished at the end of World War II. The list also does not include stations of railways not operated by the SRT, such as the Paknam Railway, the Phra Phutthabat Railway, the Bang Bua Thong Railway etc. The majority of railway stations/halts listed were present in the Station Code Book of 1 October 1979.

English name	Thai Name	Station Code	Station Class	Line	District	Province	Date closed	Notes
Ang Hin	อ่างหิน	-	Halt	Northern	Mueang	Nakhon Sawan	1944	
Ban Bang Dan	บ้านบางดาน	-	Halt	Southern	Mueang	Songkhla	1 July 1978	
Ban Don Ri	บ้านดอนรี	รา.	Halt	Southern	Phunphin	Surat Thani	?	
Ban Dong Rueang	บ้านดงเรือง	งง.	Halt	Northeastern	Kumphawapi	Udon Thani	?	
Ban Khao	บ้านขาว	ขา.	3	Northeastern	Mueang	Udon Thani	?	
Ban Klang Na	บ้านกลางนา	-	Halt	Southern	Hat Yai	Songkhla	1 July 1978	
Ban Ko Mee	บ้านเกาะหมี	-	Halt	Southern	Hat Yai	Songkhla	1 July 1978	
Ban Makham Lom	บ้านมะขามล้ม	มข.	Halt	Southern	Bang Pla Ma	Suphan Buri	?	
Ban Nong Khri	บ้านหนองขรี	-	Halt	Southern	Phunphin	Surat Thani	?	
Ban Nong Mu	บ้านหนองหมู	มู.	Halt	Northern	Phayuha Khiri	Nakhon Sawan	2004	
Ban Pa Ko	บ้านป่ากอ	ป่.	Halt	Southern	Kantang	Trang	?	
Ban Phalai	บ้านพะไล	พไ.	Halt	Northeastern	Mueang	Nakhon Ratchasima	?	
Ban Pho Mun	บ้านโพธิ์มูล	-	1	Northeastern	Warin Chamrap	Ubon Ratchathani	1977	On a spur line from Bung Wai station. Closed due to inconvenient transport of goods.
Ban Pho Ngam	บ้านโพธิ์งาม	พง.	Halt	Southern	Kamphaeng Saen	Nakhon Pathom	?	
Ban Phru	บ้านพรุ	าพ.	Halt	Southern	Hat Yai	Songkhla	Likely 1982	
Ban Phun	บ้านพูน	นู.	Halt	Southern	Thung Song	Nakhon Si Thammarat	?	
Ban Tha Khoi	บ้านท่าข่อย	าข.	Halt	Southern	Sadao	Songkhla	Likely 1982	
Ban Yupo	บ้านยุโป	ยโ.	Halt	Southern	Mueang	Yala	Before 2008	Likely closed due to unrest during the South Thailand insurgency.
Bang Khen	บางเขน	บข.	1	Northern, Northeastern	Chatuchak	Bangkok	19 January 2023	Closed after the start of long-distance services at Krung Thep Aphiwat Central Terminal. Replaced by SRT Dark Red Line station.
Bang Krabun	บางกระบูน	กู.	Halt	Maeklong	Mueang	Samut Songkhram	?	
Bang Nam Jued	บางน้ำจืด	งจ.	Halt	Southern	Tha Chang	Surat Thani	?	
Bo Fai	บ่อฝ้าย	บฝ.	Halt	Southern	Hua Hin	Prachuap Khiri Khan	?	
Bo Haeo	บ่อแฮ้ว	บฮ.	Halt	Northern	Mueang	Lampang	?	
Bo Khaem	บ่อแขม	บแ.	Halt	Southern	Cha-am	Phetchaburi	?	
Chot Nong Kae	โจดหนองแก	โจ.	Halt	Northeastern	Phon	Khon Kaen	?	
Doi Ti	ดอยติ	ดต.	Halt	Northern	Mueang	Lamphun	?	
Don Khun Wiset	ดอนขุนวิเศษ	ดส.	Halt	Southern	Kamphaeng Saen	Nakhon Pathom	1 March 1977	
Don Sa-nguan	ดอนสงวน	ดน.	Halt	Southern	Song Phi Nong	Suphan Buri	?	
Grand Canal	แกรนด์คาแนล	คแ.	Halt	Northern, Northeastern	Don Mueang	Bangkok	15 September 2020	Closed due to SRT Dark Red Line construction.
Hua Toei	หัวเตย	-	Halt	Southern	Phunphin	Surat Thani	?	
Huai Hai	ห้วยไห	ยห.	Halt	Northeastern	Mueang	Khon Kaen	?	
Huai Kiang	ห้วยเกี๋ยง	?	Halt	Northern	?	Lamphun	?	
Huai Mae Lan	ห้วยแม่ลาน	แล.	Halt	Northern	Long	Phrae	?	
Huai Suea	ห้วยเสือ	วส.	Halt	Southern	Mueang	Phetchaburi	?	
Jamboree	แจมโบรี่	-	Halt	Eastern	Sattahip	Chonburi	8 January 2003	Single purpose use for the 20th World Scout Jamboree.
Kamphaeng Saen	กำแพงแสน	กำ.	Halt	Southern	Kamphaeng Saen	Nakhon Pathom	15 December 1976	
Kan Kheha KM.19	การเคหะ กม.19	คห.	Halt	Northern, Northeastern	Don Mueang	Bangkok	19 January 2023	Closed after the start of long-distance services at Krung Thep Aphiwat Central Terminal. Replaced by SRT Dark Red Line station.
Khao Bandai Nang	เขาบันไดนาง	-	3	Southern	Hat Yai	Songkhla	1 July 1978	
Khao Din	เขาดิน	เด.	Halt	Southern	Tha Muang	Kanchanaburi	?	
Khao Lao	เขาหลาว	-	Halt	Southern	Pak Tho	Ratchaburi	?	
Khao Wor	เขาวอ	บว.	Halt	Southern	Lang Suan	Chumphon	?	
Khlong Hae	คลองแห	-	Halt	Southern	Hat Yai	Songkhla	1 July 1978	
Khlong Lamung	คลองละมุง	ลม.	Halt	Northern	Phichai	Uttaradit	?	
Khlong Muan	คลองมวน	คม.	Halt	Southern	Ratsada	Trang	?	
Khlong Ple	คลองเปล	-	Halt	Southern	Hat Yai	Songkhla	1 July 1978	
Khlong Ram	คลองรำ	รำ.	3	Southern	Sadao	Songkhla	Likely 1982	
Khlong Rangsit	คลองรังสิต	คส.	Halt	Northern, Northeastern	Thanyaburi	Pathum Thani	15 September 2020	Closed due to SRT Dark Red Line construction.
Khlong Rian	คลองเรียน	เร.	Halt	Southern	Hat Yai	Songkhla	Before 1989	
Khlong Teng	คลองเต็ง	ตง.	Halt	Southern	Mueang	Trang	?	
Khlong Yang	คลองยาง	คย.	Halt	Northern	Sawankhalok	Sukhothai	?	
Khok Chang	คอกช้าง	-	Halt	Northeastern	Sakhrai	Nong Khai	?	
Khok Makham Pom	โคกมะขามป้อม	-	Halt	Northeastern	Chai Badan	Lopburi	Likely 1998	Submerged by Pa Sak Jolasid Dam Reservoir in original route alignment. Closure mentioned in an environmental impact report of the new railway viaduct dated January 1997.
Khuan Hin	ควนหิน	-	3	Southern	Mueang	Songkhla	1 July 1978	
Khuan Jong	ควนจง	จง.	Halt	Southern	Na Mom	Songkhla	Before 1989	
Khuan Mao	ควนเมา	เม.	Halt	Southern	Ratsada	Trang	?	
Khuan Pa Ching	ควนป่าชิง	ปง.	Halt	Southern	Chana	Songkhla	1 September 1980	
Kut Kwang	กุดกว้าง	ดก.	Halt	Northeastern	Mueang	Khon Kaen	?	
Lak Hok	หลักหก	หั.	Halt	Northern, Northeastern	Mueang	Pathum Thani	15 September 2020	Replaced by SRT Dark Red Line station.
Lak Si	หลักสี่	ลส.	1	Northern, Northeastern	Lak Si	Bangkok	19 January 2023	Closed after the start of long-distance services at Krung Thep Aphiwat Central Terminal. Replaced by SRT Dark Red Line station.
Lam Phura	ลำภูรา	ลร.	Halt	Southern	Huai Yot	Trang	?	
Manao Wan	มะนาวหวาน	มห.	Halt	Northeastern	Phatthana Nikhom	Lopburi	Likely 1998	Submerged by Pa Sak Jolasid Dam Reservoir in original route alignment. Closure mentioned in an environmental impact report of the new railway viaduct dated January 1997.
Na Po	นาป้อ	ปอ.	Halt	Southern	Mueang	Trang	?	
Nam Krachai	น้ำกระจาย	-	3	Southern	Mueang	Songkhla	1 July 1978	
Nam Noi	น้ำน้อย	-	3	Southern	Hat Yai	Songkhla	1 July 1978	
Nam Rit	น้ำริด	นร.	Halt	Northern	Mueang	Uttaradit	1 May 1936	
Nikhom Rotfai KM.11	นิคมรถไฟกม.11	รถ.	Halt	Northern, Northeastern	Chatuchak	Bangkok	19 January 2023	Closed after the start of long-distance services at Krung Thep Aphiwat Central Terminal. Replaced by SRT Dark Red Line station.
Nong Bua Ngoen	หนองบัวเงิน	เง.	Halt	Northeastern	Sakhrai	Nong Khai	?	
Nong Fak	หนองฟัก	นฟ.	Halt	Southern	Kamphaeng Saen	Nakhon Pathom	?	
Nong Khai Nam	หนองไข่น้ำ	อข.	Halt	Northeastern	Mueang	Nakhon Ratchasima	2019	Opened 10 January 2011 to serve the nearby Sima Thani housing project. Closed after the completion of the double-tracking project and the opening of Ban Kradon station.
Nong Mek	หนองเม็ก	งม.	Halt	Northeastern	Mueang	Khon Kaen	?	
Nong Phakchi	หนองผักชี	ผช.	Halt	Southern	Bang Pla Ma	Suphan Buri	?	
Nong Riang	หนองเรียง	นย.	Halt	Northern	Sawankhalok	Sukhothai	?	
Nong Song Hong	หนองสองห้อง	สห.	3	Northeastern	Mueang	Nong Khai	?	
Nong Taphot	หนองตาพด	ตพ.	Halt	Southern	Cha-am	Phetchaburi	?	
Nong Tum	หนองตูม	ตู.	3	Northeastern	Mueang	Udon Thani	?	
Nong Wan Priang	หนองวัลย์เปรียง	หเ.	Halt	Southern	Song Phi Nong	Suphan Buri	?	
Pak Khlong San	ปากคลองสาน	คส.	1	Maeklong	Khlong San	Bangkok	1 January 1961	Closed to make way for increased road traffic.
Pa Tiao	ป่าเตียว	-	Halt	Southern	Kantang	Trang	19 July 1965	
Phahon Yothin	พหลโยธิน	พหลโยธิน	1	Northern	Bang Sue	Bangkok	27 December 2013	Short-lived railway station at the back of Bangkok Bus Terminal (Chatuchak).
Phru Yai	พรุใหญ่	ใญ.	Halt	Southern	Kantang	Trang	?	
Ratchaprarop	ราชปรารภ	-	Halt	Eastern	Ratchathewi	Bangkok	?	Replaced by Airport Rail Link Station.
Rong Rian Don Mueang	โรงเรียนดอนเมือง	-	Halt	Northern, Northeastern, Southern	Don Mueang	Bangkok	?	
Rong Rian Samsen	โรงเรียนสามเสน	-	Halt	Northern, Northeastern, Southern	Phaya Thai	Bangkok	?	
Saen Suk	แสนสุข	แน.	Halt	Eastern	Mueang	Chonburi	?	
Sakae Yang Mu	สะแกย่างหมู	สู.	Halt	Southern	Bang Pla Ma	Suphan Buri	?	
Sala Thung Lung	ศาลาทุ่งลุง	ลง.	3	Southern	Hat Yai	Songkhla	Likely 1982	Converted into community park.
Samae San	แสมสาร	-	Halt	Eastern	Sattahip	Chonburi	?	
Saphang Khoen	สะพังเขิน	-	Halt	Southern	Song Phi Nong	Suphan Buri	?	
Songkhla	สงขลา	สข.	1	Southern	Mueang	Songkhla	1 July 1978	A railway booking office exists in the old station building.
Sra Thammakhan	สระธรรมขันธ์	ธข.	Halt	Northeastern	Mueang	Nakhon Ratchasima	?	
Suan Mun	สวนมัน	สม.	Halt	Southern	Mueang	Trang	?	
Sun Fuek Nakhon Ban	ศูนย์ฝึกนครบาล	-	Halt	Northern, Northeastern	Lak Si	Bangkok	?	
Talat Hat Yai	ตลาดหาดใหญ่	-	Halt	Southern	Hat Yai	Songkhla	1 July 1978	
Talat Mai Don Mueang	ตลาดใหม่ดอนเมือง	ตใ.	Halt	Northern, Northeastern	Don Mueang	Bangkok	19 January 2023	Closed after the start of long-distance services at Krung Thep Aphiwat Central Terminal. However, in the final years before its closure, no trains stopped at the halt.
Talat Nam Noi	ตลาดน้ำน้อย	-	Halt	Southern	Hat Yai	Songkhla	1 July 1978	
Talat Nong Khai	ตลาดหนองคาย	ตง.	Halt	Northeastern	Mueang	Nong Khai	2008	Original provincial station for Nong Khai before the current station was built.
Talat Phawong	ตลาดพะวง	-	Halt	Southern	Mueang	Songkhla	1 July 1978	
Tha Maka	ท่ามะกา	มะ.	Halt	Southern	Tha Maka	Kanchanaburi	?	
Thai	ไทย	ไท.	Halt	Eastern	Aranyaprathet	Sa Kaeo	1 July 1974	Closed after suspension of Thai-Cambodia cross-border services during the Khmer Rouge rule.
Thale Bok	ทะเลบก	ทะ.	Halt	Southern	Kamphaeng Saen	Nakhon Pathom	?	
Thap Kwang	ทับกวาง	กว.	Halt	Northeastern	Kaeng Khoi	Saraburi	?	Closed from difficulties in stopping trains due to inappropriate rail slope.
Thon Buri (Old)	ธนบุรี (เก่า)	ธบ.	1	Southern	Bangkok Noi	Bangkok	4 October 2003	Replaced by Bangkok Noi Station (now renamed Thon Buri). Currently houses the Siriraj Bhimuksthan Museum.
Thung Na Thale	ทุ่งนาทะเล	-	Halt	Southern	Mueang	Kanchanaburi	15 September 1978	
Thung Nam Sum	ทุ่งน้ำซึม	ทซ.	Halt	Northern	Phayuha Khiri	Nakhon Sawan	?	
Thung Song Hong	ทุ่งสองห้อง	หส.	Halt	Northern, Northeastern	Lak Si	Bangkok	19 January 2023	Closed after the start of long-distance services at Krung Thep Aphiwat Central Terminal. Replaced by SRT Dark Red Line station.
Thung Ta Kaeo	ทุ่งตาแก้ว	-	Halt	Northeastern	Chai Badan	Lopburi	?	
U-Taphao	อู่ตะเภา	อภ.	Halt	Southern	Hat Yai	Songkhla	1 September 1986	Was a junction for the Southern Main Line and the now defunct Southern Line Songkhla Branch.
Vittayalai Kaset	วิทยาลัยเกษตร	-	Halt	Southern	Mueang	Kanchanaburi	?	
Wat Khlong Pu	วัดคลองปู	วู.	Halt	Northern	Sawankhalok	Sukhothai	?	
Wat Ko Chan	วัดเกาะจันทร์	วจ.	Halt	Eastern	Mueang	Chachoengsao	?	
Wat Samian Nari	วัดเสมียนนารี	-	Halt	Northern, Northeastern	Chatuchak	Bangkok	Before 2000	Replaced by SRT Dark Red Line Station in 2021.
Wat Thewa Sunthon	วัดเทวสุนทร	-	Halt	Northern, Northeastern	Chatuchak	Bangkok	?	
Wat Uthai	วัดอุทัย	-	Halt	Southern	Mueang	Songkhla	1 July 1978	
Yang Prasat	ยางประสาท	ยะ.	Halt	Southern	Mueang	Nakhon Pathom	1 January 1977	
Yang Yuan	ยางยวน	ยย.	Halt	Southern	Huai Yot	Trang	?	
