= Hin Tok, Nakhon Si Thammarat =

Coordinates: 8.25788356°N 99.8148720568°E

Hin Tok (Thai: หินตก, pronounced [hǐn tòk]) is a tambon (subdistrict) of Ron Phibun district, Nakhon Si Thammarat province, southern Thailand.

== History and toponymy ==
Its name "Hin Tok" literally translates to "rockfall" as rocks often fall from the cliffs in what is now Tham Nam.

The subdistrict was planted around 1932 with the first leader named Thap Wannasuk (ทับ วรรณสุข).

== Geography ==
Hin Tok is the uppermost part of Ron Phibun. The topography is foothill plains, consisting of mountains along the Nakhon Si Thammarat range, with streams, waterfalls, and national reserved forests, which is the source of many important local water resources.

The area is about 8 km (5.0 mi) north of the district centre and about 26 km (16.2 mi) south of city of Nakhon Si Thammarat.

== Administration ==
Hin Tok is administered by two local government bodies, Hin Tok Subdistrict Administrative Organization and Hin Tok Subdistrict Municipality.

It also consists of 12 administrative mubans (villages).

No.	Name	Thai
1.	Ban Thalung Thong	บ้านถลุงทอง
2.	Ban Tha Sai	บ้านท่าไทร
3.	Ban Sala Khaek	บ้านศาลาแขก
4.	Ban Pa Sa-nguan	บ้านป่าสงวน
5.	Ban Sam Roi Khla	บ้านสามร้อยกล้า
6.	Ban Pat Vogue	บ้านปัดโวก
7.	Ban Samak Khaya Ram	บ้านสามัคยาราม
8.	Ban Khun Phang	บ้านขุนพัง
9.	Ban Mai La	บ้านไม้หลา
10.	Ban Plai Rang	บ้านปลายราง
11.	Ban Phru Ching	บ้านพรุชิง
12.	Ban Khiri Mai	บ้านคีรีใหม่

== Population ==
At the end of 2022, it had a total population of 18,685.

== Local traditions and festivals ==
- Ten Month Tradition
- Chak Phra (pulling the Buddha)
- Offering Candle Incense to Monks
- Make Merit by Fire

== Places ==
- Khun Phang Waterfall
- Mai La Market
- Wat Thalung Thong
- Wat Wiphawadi Rangsitaram
