= Hua Sai district =

Hua Sai หัวไทร
- District
- District location in Nakhon Si Thammarat province
- Coordinates: 8°2′24″N 100°16′30″E
- Country: Thailand
- Province: Nakhon Si Thammarat
- Seat: Hua Sai

Area
  - Total: 417.733 km^{2} (161.288 sq mi)

Population (2005)
  - Total: 68,863
  - Density: 164.8/km^{2} (427/sq mi)
- Time zone: UTC+7 (ICT)
- Postal code: 80170
- Geocode: 8016

Hua Sai (Thai: หัวไทร, pronounced [hǔa̯ sāj]) is a district (amphoe) in the southeastern part of Nakhon Si Thammarat province, southern Thailand.

== Geography ==
Neighboring districts are (from the south clockwise): Ranot of Songkhla province; Khuan Khanun and Pa Phayom of Phatthalung province; Cha-uat, Chian Yai, and Pak Phanang of Nakhon Si Thammarat Province. To the east is the Gulf of Thailand.

== History ==
The district was established in 1904, then named Khao Phang Krai (เขาพังไกร), as the administrative center was in tambon Khao Phang Krai. When the center was moved in 1906 to tambon Hua Sai, the district was renamed accordingly. In 1924 the district was reduced to a minor district (king amphoe) under Pak Phanang district. In the same year the district office was moved to its present location in village eight of tambon Hua Sai. In 1937 the district regained full district status.

== Administration ==
The district is divided into 11 sub-districts (tambons), which are further subdivided into 99 villages (mubans). Hua Sai is a township (thesaban tambon) which covers parts of tambons Hua Sai and Na Saton. There are a further 11 tambon administrative organizations (TAO).

No.	Name	Thai name	Villages	Pop.
1.	Hua Sai	หัวไทร	12	11,236
2.	Na Saton	หน้าสตน	9	10,795
3.	Sai Khao	ทรายขาว	12	8,011
4.	Laem	แหลม	12	6,673
5.	Khao Phang Krai	เขาพังไกร	10	7,485
6.	Ban Ram	บ้านราม	8	3,755
7.	Bang Nop	บางนบ	9	2,298
8.	Tha Som	ท่าซอม	9	3,321
9.	Khuan Chalik	ควนชะลิก	6	5,454
10.	Ram Kaeo	รามแก้ว	5	2,588
11.	Ko Phet	เกาะเพชร	9	7,247

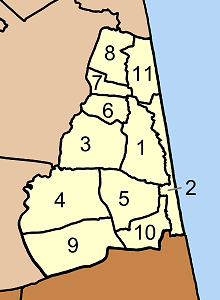
