= Chian Yai district =

District of Thailand

Chian Yai เชียรใหญ่
- District
- District location in Nakhon Si Thammarat province
- Coordinates: 8°10′6″N 100°8′42″E
- Country: Thailand
- Province: Nakhon Si Thammarat
- Seat: Chian Yai

Area
  - Total: 232.7 km^{2} (89.8 sq mi)

Population (2005)
  - Total: 45,827
  - Density: 196.9/km^{2} (510/sq mi)
- Time zone: UTC+7 (ICT)
- Postal code: 80190
- Geocode: 8006

Chian Yai (Thai: เชียรใหญ่, pronounced [t͡ɕʰīa̯n jàj]) is a district (amphoe) in the southeastern part of Nakhon Si Thammarat province, southern Thailand.

== Geography ==
Neighboring districts are (from the north clockwise): Pak Phanang, Hua Sai, Cha-uat, and Chaloem Phra Kiat.

== History ==
The minor district (king amphoe) on 1 February 1937 by splitting it from Pak Phanang district. It was upgraded to a full district on 3 November 1947.

== Administration ==
The district is divided into 10 sub-districts (tambons), which are further subdivided into 98 villages (mubans). Chian Yai is a township (thesaban tambon) which covers parts of tambons Chian Yai, Tha Khanan, and Thong Lamchiak. There are a further nine tambon administrative organizations (TAO).

No.	Name	Thai name	Villages	Pop.
1.	Chian Yai	เชียรใหญ่	10	4,210
3.	Tha Khanan	ท่าขนาน	11	2,989
4.	Banklang	บ้านกลาง	4	1,037
5.	Ban Noen	บ้านเนิน	10	3,144
6.	Sai Mak	ไสหมาก	11	4,900
7.	Thong Lamchiak	ท้องลำเจียก	10	4,816
10.	Suea Hueng	เสือหึง	11	3,030
11.	Karaket	การะเกด	12	7,371
12.	Khao Phra Bat	เขาพระบาท	9	6,849
13.	Mae Chao Yu Hua	แม่เจ้าอยู่หัว	10	7,481

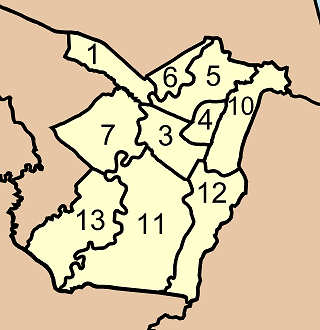

Missing numbers belong to tambons which now form Chaloem Phra Kiat.
