= Noen Sa-nga district =

Noen Sa-nga เนินสง่า
- District
- District location in Chaiyaphum province
- Coordinates: 15°33′51″N 102°0′6″E
- Country: Thailand
- Province: Chaiyaphum
- Seat: Nong Chim

Area
  - Total: 222.03 km^{2} (85.73 sq mi)

Population (2000)
  - Total: 24,125
  - Density: 108.7/km^{2} (282/sq mi)
- Time zone: UTC+7 (ICT)
- Postal code: 36130
- Geocode: 3615

Noen Sa-nga (Thai: เนินสง่า, pronounced [nɤ̄ːn sā.ŋàː]; Northeastern Thai: เนินสง่า, pronounced [nɤ̂ːn sā.ŋāː]) is a district (amphoe) of Chaiyaphum province, northeastern Thailand.

== History ==
The government separated Tambon Nong Chim, Ta Noen, and Kahad of Chatturat district to create the minor district (king amphoe) Noen Sa-nga on 1 April 1992. It was upgraded to a full district on 11 October 1997.

== Geography ==
Neighboring districts are (from the east clockwise): Ban Lueam, Khong, and Phra Thong Kham of Nakhon Ratchasima province; Chatturat, Ban Khwao, and Mueang Chaiyaphum of Chaiyaphum Province.

== Administration ==
The district is divided into four subdistricts (tambons), which are further subdivided into 48 villages (mubans). There are no municipal (thesaban) areas. There are four tambon administrative organizations.

1.	Nong Chim	หนองฉิม
2.	Ta Noen	ตาเนิน
3.	Kahad	กะฮาด
4.	Rang Ngam	รังงาม
