= Ban Lueam district =

Ban Lueam บ้านเหลื่อม
- District
- District location in Nakhon Ratchasima province
- Coordinates: 15°36′33″N 102°7′46″E
- Country: Thailand
- Province: Nakhon Ratchasima
- Seat: Ban Lueam

Area
  - Total: 218.9 km^{2} (84.5 sq mi)

Population (2009)
  - Total: 21,480
  - Density: 101.3/km^{2} (262/sq mi)
- Time zone: UTC+7 (ICT)
- Postal code: 30350
- Geocode: 3005

Ban Lueam (Thai: บ้านเหลื่อม, pronounced [bâːn lɯ̀am]; Northeastern Thai: บ้านเหลื่อม, pronounced [bâːn lɯ̄am]) is a district (amphoe) in the northern part of Nakhon Ratchasima province, northeastern Thailand.

== Etymology ==
The name Lueam comes from the Ma Lueam tree (Canarium subulatum Guill.). In the past, a big tree of this kind was the landmark of the village.

== History ==
Tambon Ban Lueam, Wang Pho, and Khok Krabueang were separated from Khong district to create a minor district (king amphoe) on 18 October 1976. It was upgraded to a full district on 1 January 1988.

== Geography ==
Neighbouring districts are (from the north clockwise): Kaeng Sanam Nang, Bua Yai, and Khong of Nakhon Ratchasima province, and Noen Sa-nga and Mueang Chaiyaphum of Chaiyaphum province.

== Administration ==
The district is divided into four sub-districts (tambons), which are further subdivided into 39 villages (mubans). Ban Lueam is also a sub-district municipality (thesaban tambon) covering parts of tambons Ban Lueam and Wang Pho. There are a further four tambon administrative organizations (TAO).

| No. | Name | Thai | Pop. |
|---|---|---|---|
| 1. | Ban Lueam | บ้านเหลื่อม | 6,465 |
| 2. | Wang Pho | วังโพธิ์ | 2,563 |
| 3. | Khok Krabueang | โคกกระเบื้อง | 8,668 |
| 4. | Cho Raka | ช่อระกา | 3,784 |
