= Chaloem Phra Kiat district, Nakhon Si Thammarat =

District of Thailand

Chaloem Phra Kiat เฉลิมพระเกียรติ
- District
- District location in Nakhon Si Thammarat province
- Coordinates: 8°10′36″N 100°2′6″E
- Country: Thailand
- Province: Nakhon Si Thammarat
- Seat: Suan Luang

Area
  - Total: 124.1 km^{2} (47.9 sq mi)

Population (2005)
  - Total: 33,466
  - Density: 269.7/km^{2} (699/sq mi)
- Time zone: UTC+7 (ICT)
- Postal code: 80190
- Geocode: 8023

Chaloem Phra Kiat (Thai: เฉลิมพระเกียรติ, pronounced [t͡ɕʰā.lɤ̌ːm pʰráʔ kìa̯t]) is a district (amphoe) of Nakhon Si Thammarat province, southern Thailand.

== History ==
The district was created on 5 December 1996, together with four other districts named Chaloem Phra Kiat in celebration of the 50th anniversary of King Bhumibol Adulyadej's accession to the throne.

The district was composed of three tambons: Chian Khao, Don Tro, and Suan Luang of Chian Yai district and tambon Thang Phun from Ron Phibun.

== Geography ==
Neighboring districts are (from the north clockwise): Phra Phrom, Mueang Nakhon Si Thammarat, Pak Phanang, Chian Yai, Cha-uat, and Ron Phibun.

== Administration ==
The district is divided into four sub-districts (tambons), which are further subdivided into 37 villages (mubans). There are no municipal (thesaban) areas, and four tambon administrative organizations (TAO).

No.	Name	Thai name	Villages	Pop.
1.	Chian Khao	เชียรเขา	13	6,868
2.	Don Tro	ดอนตรอ	5	6,271
3.	Suan Luang	สวนหลวง	13	11,190
4.	Thang Phun	ทางพูน	6	9,137

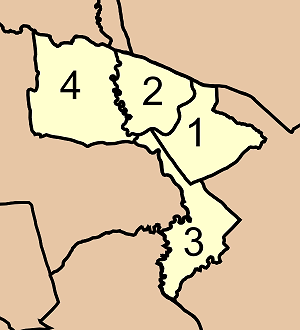
