= Ron Phibun district =

Ron Phibun district อำเภอร่อนพิบูลย์
- District
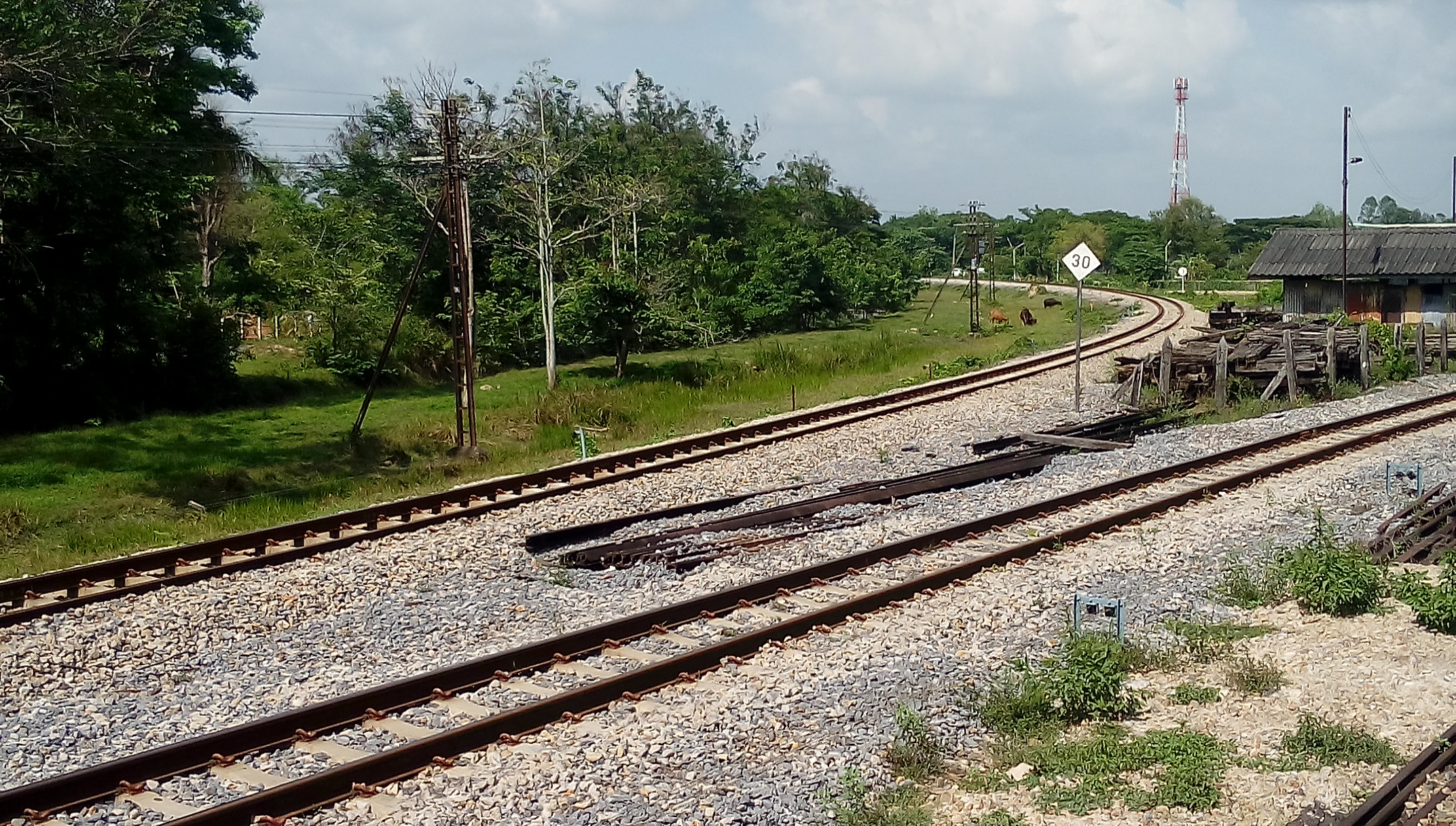
- Level junction near Khao Chum Thong Junction railway station, Ron Phibun

- District location in Nakhon Si Thammarat province
- Coordinates: 8°10′48″N 99°51′18″E
- Country: Thailand
- Province: Nakhon Si Thammarat
- Seat: Ron Phibun

Area
  - Total: 335.5 km^{2} (129.5 sq mi)

Population (2005)
  - Total: 82,754
  - Density: 246.7/km^{2} (639/sq mi)
- Time zone: UTC+7 (ICT)
- Postal code: 80130
- Geocode: 8013

Ron Phibun (Thai: อำเภอร่อนพิบูลย์, pronounced [rɔ̂n pʰí(ʔ).būːn]) Ron Phibun or Ronphibun is a district (amphoe) in the southern part of Nakhon Si Thammarat province, southern Thailand. The district is home to the Phud Hong Leper Colony. As of 2020, it provides a home for 133 leprosy patients.

== Geography ==
Neighboring districts are (from the west clockwise): Thung Song, Lan Saka, Phra Phrom, Chaloem Phra Kiat, Cha-uat, and Chulabhorn of Nakhon Si Thammarat province.

== Administration ==
The district is divided into six sub-districts (tambons), which are further subdivided into 61 villages (mubans). There are three townships (thesaban tambons). Ron Phibun and Hin Tok both covers parts of the same-named tambons, and Khao Chum Thong covers the whole tambon Khuan Koei. There are a further six tambon administrative organizations (TAO).

No.	Name	Thai name	Villages	Pop.
1.	Ron Phibun	ร่อนพิบูลย์	16	26,287
2.	Hin Tok	หินตก	12	19,431
3.	Sao Thong	เสาธง	8	11,435
4.	Khuan Koei	ควนเกย	10	4,495
5.	Khuan Phang	ควนพัง	8	12,711
6.	Khuan Chum	ควนชุม	7	8,395

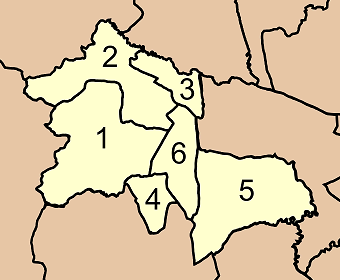
