= Ban Dong Bang railway station =

Railway station in Thailand

Ban Dong Bang บ้านดงบัง

General information
- Location: Dong Bang Subdistrict, Prachantakham District; Prachinburi Province; Thailand
- Coordinates: 14.0404°N 101.5988°E
- Operator: State Railway of Thailand
- Manager: Ministry of Transport
- Line: Aranyaprathet Main Line
- Platforms: 1
- Tracks: 3

Construction
- Structure type: At-grade

Other information
- Station code: ดบ.
- Classification: Class 3

Services
Preceding station	State Railway of Thailand	Following station
Nong Saeng towards Hua Lamphong	Eastern Line	Ban Nong Sriwichai Halt towards Poipet (Cambodia)
Location

Ban Dong Bang station (Thai: สถานีบ้านดงบัง) is a railway station located in Dong Bang Subdistrict, Prachantakham District, Prachinburi Province. It is a class 3 railway station located 146.73 km (91.2 mi) from Bangkok railway station.
