= Cha-uat district =

Cha-uat ชะอวด
- District
- District location in Nakhon Si Thammarat province
- Coordinates: 7°57′54″N 99°59′54″E
- Country: Thailand
- Province: Nakhon Si Thammarat
- Seat: Cha-uat

Area
  - Total: 833.002 km^{2} (321.624 sq mi)

Population (2005)
  - Total: 84,227
  - Density: 101.1/km^{2} (262/sq mi)
- Time zone: UTC+7 (ICT)
- Postal code: 80180
- Geocode: 8007

Cha-uat (Thai: ชะอวด, pronounced [t͡ɕʰā.ʔùa̯t]) is a district (amphoe) in the southern part of Nakhon Si Thammarat province, southern Thailand.

== Geography ==
Neighboring districts are (from the west clockwise): Thung Song, Chulabhorn, Ron Phibun, Chaloem Phra Kiat, Chian Yai, and Hua Sai of Nakhon Si Thammarat Province; Ranot of Songkhla province; Khuan Khanun and Pa Phayom of Phatthalung province; and Huai Yot of Trang province.

Khao Pu - Khao Ya National Park is in the Nakhon Si Thammarat mountain range at the boundary of Phatthalung and Trang Provinces.

== History ==
The minor district (king amphoe) was created in 1923, when it was split from Ron Phibun district. It was upgraded to a full district on 1 January 1953.

In 1918, the southern railway line was opened to Padang Besar. This route also passes through Cha-uat. It has brought prosperity and trade to the local raising the level to make Cha-uat progress accordingly. Not long after, Thai Chinese settled down to do business. In those days, Cha-uat was one of the important economic zones of Nakhon Si Thammarat.

Later, when more roads were cut, the land transportation route became more convenient, because it can travel directly to the major cities. Cha-uat became just a transit town, but still hides good stuff that are valuable.

== Administration ==
The district is divided into 11 sub-districts (tambons), which are further subdivided into 88 villages (mubans). Cha-uat is a township (thesaban tambon) which covers parts of tambon Cha-uat and Tha Pra Cha. There are a further 11 tambon administrative organizations (TAO).

| No. | Name | Thai name | Villages | Pop. |
|---|---|---|---|---|
| 1. | Cha-uat | ชะอวด | 9 | 12,405 |
| 2. | Tha Samet | ท่าเสม็ด | 7 | 4,765 |
| 3. | Tha Pracha | ท่าประจะ | 6 | 7,180 |
| 4. | Khreng | เคร็ง | 11 | 7,654 |
| 5. | Wang Ang | วังอ่าง | 10 | 9,551 |
| 6. | Ban Tun | บ้านตูล | 6 | 6,955 |
| 7. | Khon Hat | ขอนหาด | 8 | 6,147 |
| 8. | Ko Khan | เกาะขันธ์ | 9 | 8,903 |
| 9. | Khuan Nong Hong | ควนหนองหงษ์ | 8 | 6,830 |
| 10. | Khao Phra Thong | เขาพระทอง | 7 | 7,345 |
| 11. | Nang Long | นางหลง | 7 | 6,492 |

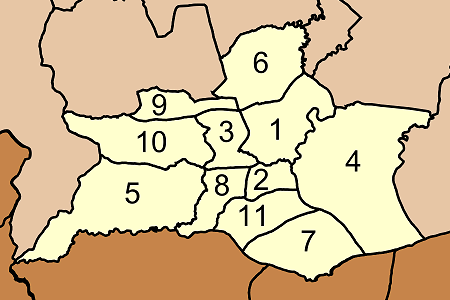

== Environment ==
Cha-uat, particularly Khreng sub-district, is home to the Khuan Khreng Peat Swamp Forest. It is the largest and most fertile peat swamp forest in Thailand, second only to the To Daeng Peat Swamp Forest in Narathiwat province. The forest covers an area of more than 900,000 rai (355,731 acres) and extends into Phatthalung and Songkhla provinces.

Local residents make use of the Khuan Khreng peat swamp by collecting krajood (Lepironia grass), which is woven into various household products such as baskets and chalom (traditional bamboo baskets). This provides an important source of income for local families. However, the peat swamp forest frequently faces problems with spreading wildfires.
