= Mueang Nakhon Si Thammarat district =

Mueang Nakhon Si Thammarat district อำเภอเมืองนครศรีธรรมราช
- District
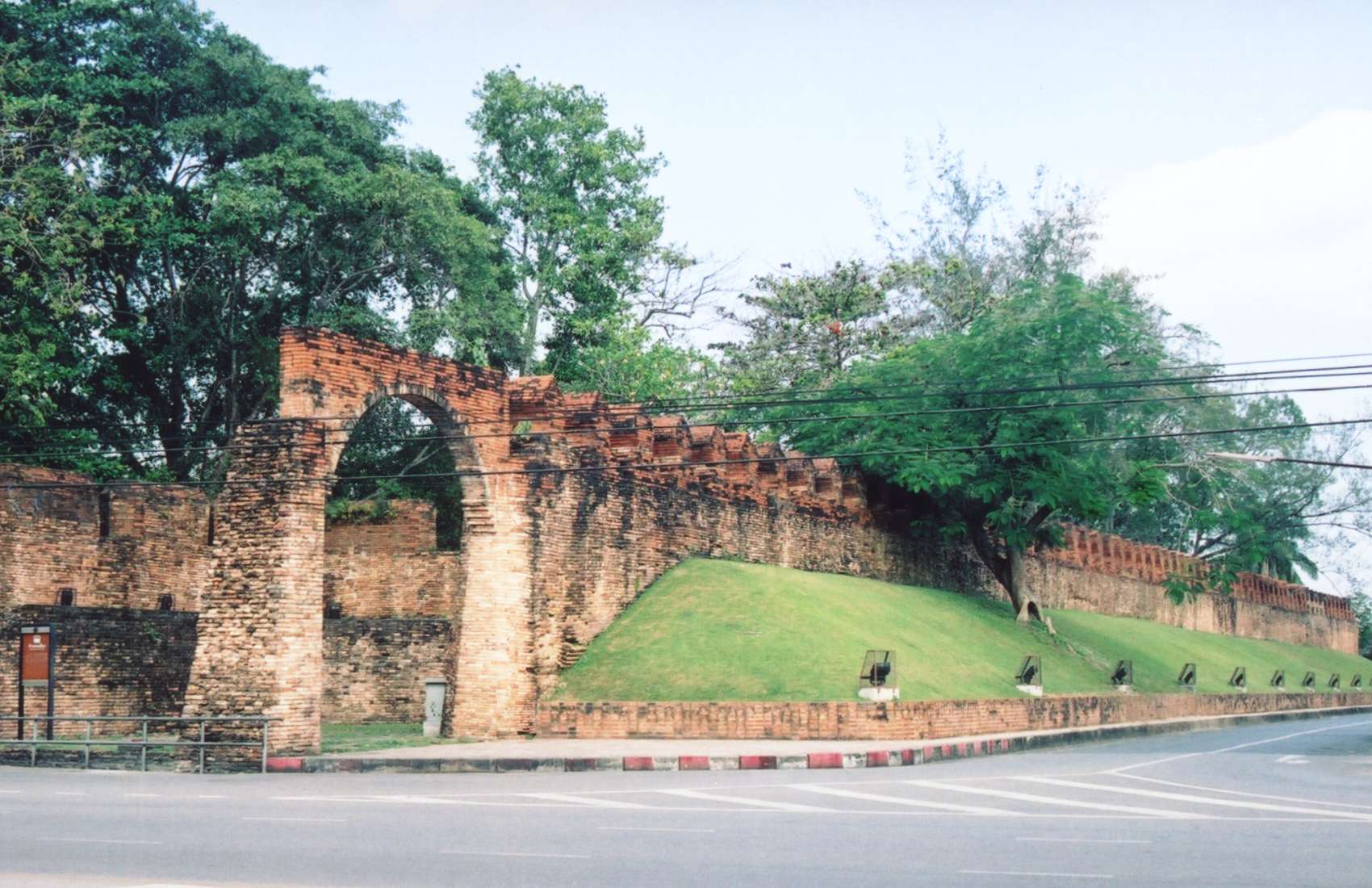
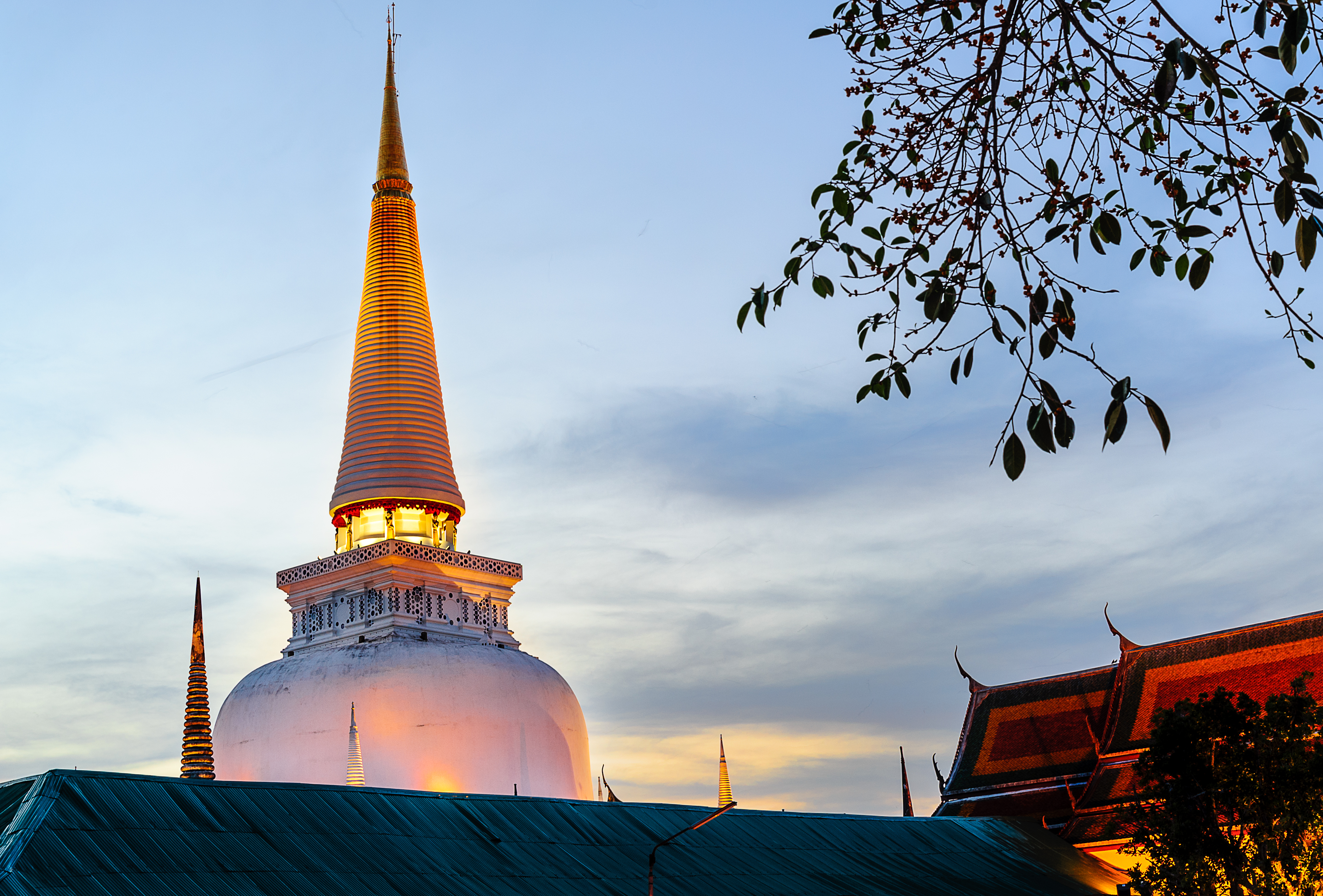
- Aerial view of Mueang Nakhon Si Thammarat

- District location in Nakhon Si Thammarat province
- Coordinates: 8°25′12″N 99°57′48″E
- Country: Thailand
- Province: Nakhon Si Thammarat
- Seat: Nai Mueang

Area
  - Total: 617.4 km^{2} (238.4 sq mi)

Population (2009)
  - Total: 266,613
  - Density: 431.83/km^{2} (1,118.4/sq mi)
- Time zone: UTC+7 (ICT)
- Postal code: 80000
- Geocode: 8001

Mueang Nakhon Si Thammarat (Thai: อำเภอเมืองนครศรีธรรมราช, pronounced [mɯ̄a̯ŋ ná(ʔ).kʰɔ̄ːn sǐː tʰām.mā.râːt]) is the capital district (amphoe mueang) of Nakhon Si Thammarat province in southern Thailand.

== Geography ==
Neighboring districts are (from the southeast clockwise): Pak Phanang, Chaloem Phra Kiat, Phra Phrom, Lan Saka, Phrom Khiri and Tha Sala. To the east is the Gulf of Thailand.

== Administration ==
The district is divided into 16 sub-districts (tambons), which are further subdivided into 114 villages (mubans).

No.	Name	Thai name	Villages	Pop.
1.	Nai Mueang	ในเมือง	-	46,364
2.	Tha Wang	ท่าวัง	-	17,234
3.	Khlang	คลัง	-	18,638
6.	Tha Rai	ท่าไร่	6	8,437
7.	Pak Nakhon	ปากนคร	6	12,501
8.	Na Sai	นาทราย	6	6,124
12.	Kamphaeng Sao	กำแพงเซา	9	9,784
13.	Chaiyamontri	ไชยมนตรี	5	6,460
14.	Mamuang Song Ton	มะม่วงสองต้น	6	4,422
15.	Na Khian	นาเคียน	8	12,506
16.	Tha Ngio	ท่างิ้ว	9	10,425
18.	Pho Sadet	โพธิ์เสด็จ	9	31,709
19.	Bang Chak	บางจาก	11	11,521
20.	Pak Phun	ปากพูน	12	36,063
21.	Tha Sak	ท่าซัก	9	9,743
22.	Tha Ruea	ท่าเรือ	18	22,968

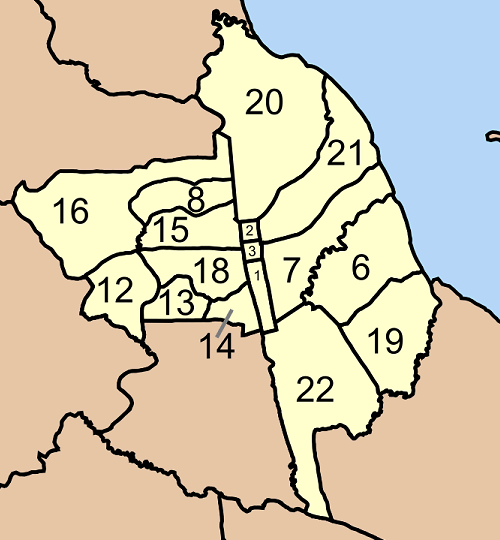

The missing numbers 9-11 and 17 belong to communes which were split off in 1994 to form Phra Phrom District.

Nakhon Si Thammarat itself has city status (thesaban nakhon) and covers tambons Nai Mueang, Tha Wang, Khlang, and parts of Na Khian and Pho Sadet. There are a further three townships (thesaban tambons): Bang Chak covering parts of the same-named tambon, Tha Phae covering parts of tambon Pak Phun, and Pak Nakhon covering parts of tambons Tha Rai and Pak Nakhon. There are also 13 tambon administrative organizations (TAO).
