= Tha Muang railway station =

Railway station in Thailand

Tha Muang ท่าม่วง
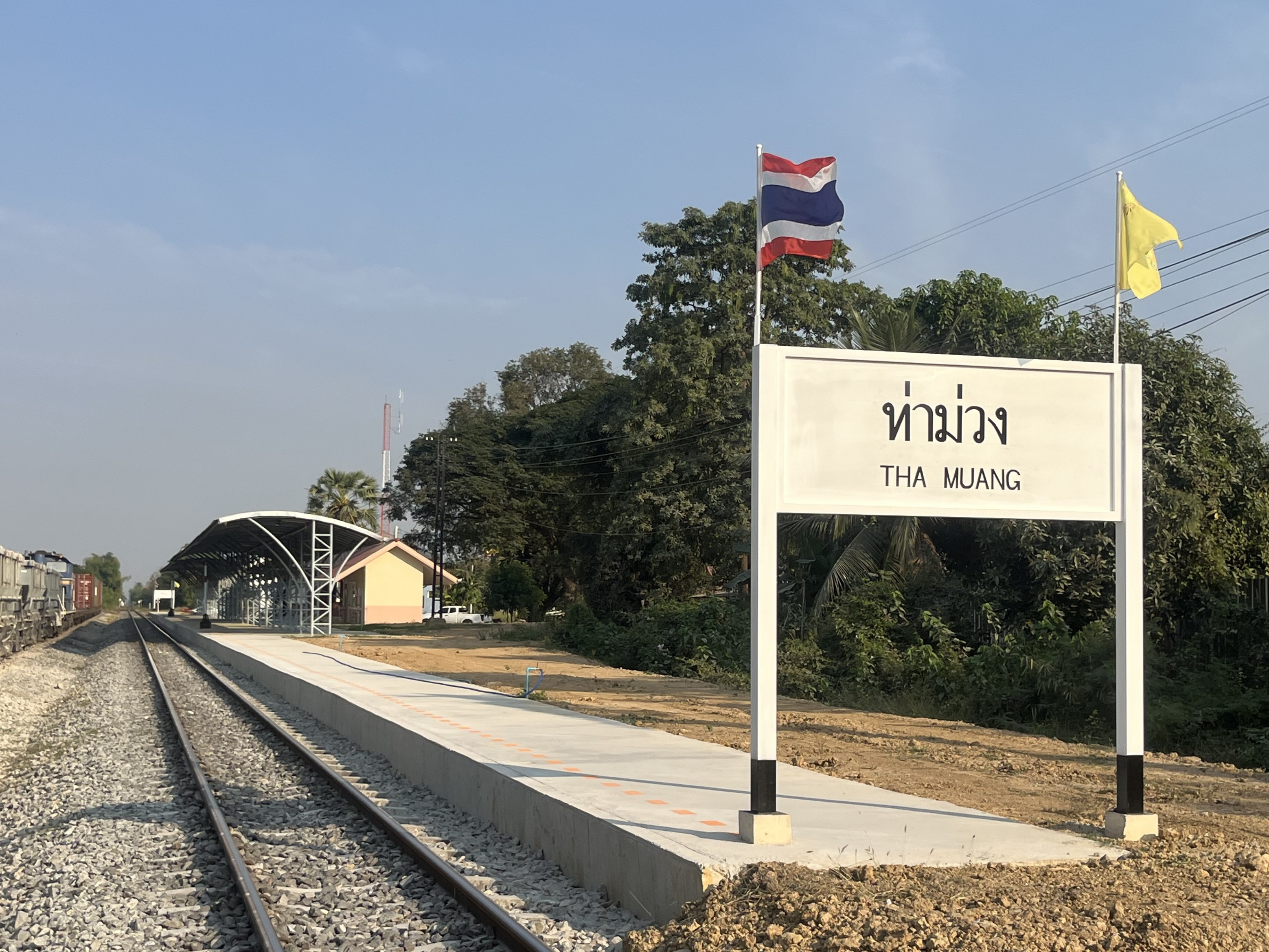
- Station in 2026

General information
- Location: Wang Khanai Subdistrict, Tha Muang District; Kanchanaburi Province; Thailand
- Coordinates: 13.9768°N 99.6594°E
- Operator: State Railway of Thailand
- Manager: Ministry of Transport
- Line: Nam Tok Line (Death Railway)
- Platforms: 1
- Tracks: 3

Construction
- Structure type: At-grade

Other information
- Station code: าม.
- Classification: Class 4

History
- Opened: 24 June 1949 (original)
- Closed: Mid-1980s (original)
- Rebuilt: 20 May 2023

Services
Preceding station	State Railway of Thailand	Following station
Tha Ruea Noi towards Nong Pladuk Junction	Southern Line Burma Railway	Thung Thong towards Nam Tok Sai Yok Noi Halt
Location

Tha Muang railway station is a railway station located in Wang Khanai Subdistrict, Tha Muang District, Kanchanaburi Province. It is a class 4 railway station located 100.34 km (62.3 mi) from Thon Buri railway station.

The station formerly opened as part of the line in 1942 by the Imperial Japanese Army during the Second World War. After the war, the State Railway of Thailand bought the line from the Allied powers, and the station reopened on June 24, 1949. It was downgraded to a halt in 1961 and closed sometime during the 1980s. Later, a container yard was built at the former station site, with one passing loop and one refuge siding to accommodate frieght services. However, it did not function as a train station and trains do not stop here for passenger services. It was officially reopened again with a new station building on May 20, 2023, as State Railway of Thailand's 441st station.
