= Ban Huai Khwang railway station =

Railway station in Chonburi, Thailand

Ban Huai Khwang บ้านห้วยขวาง
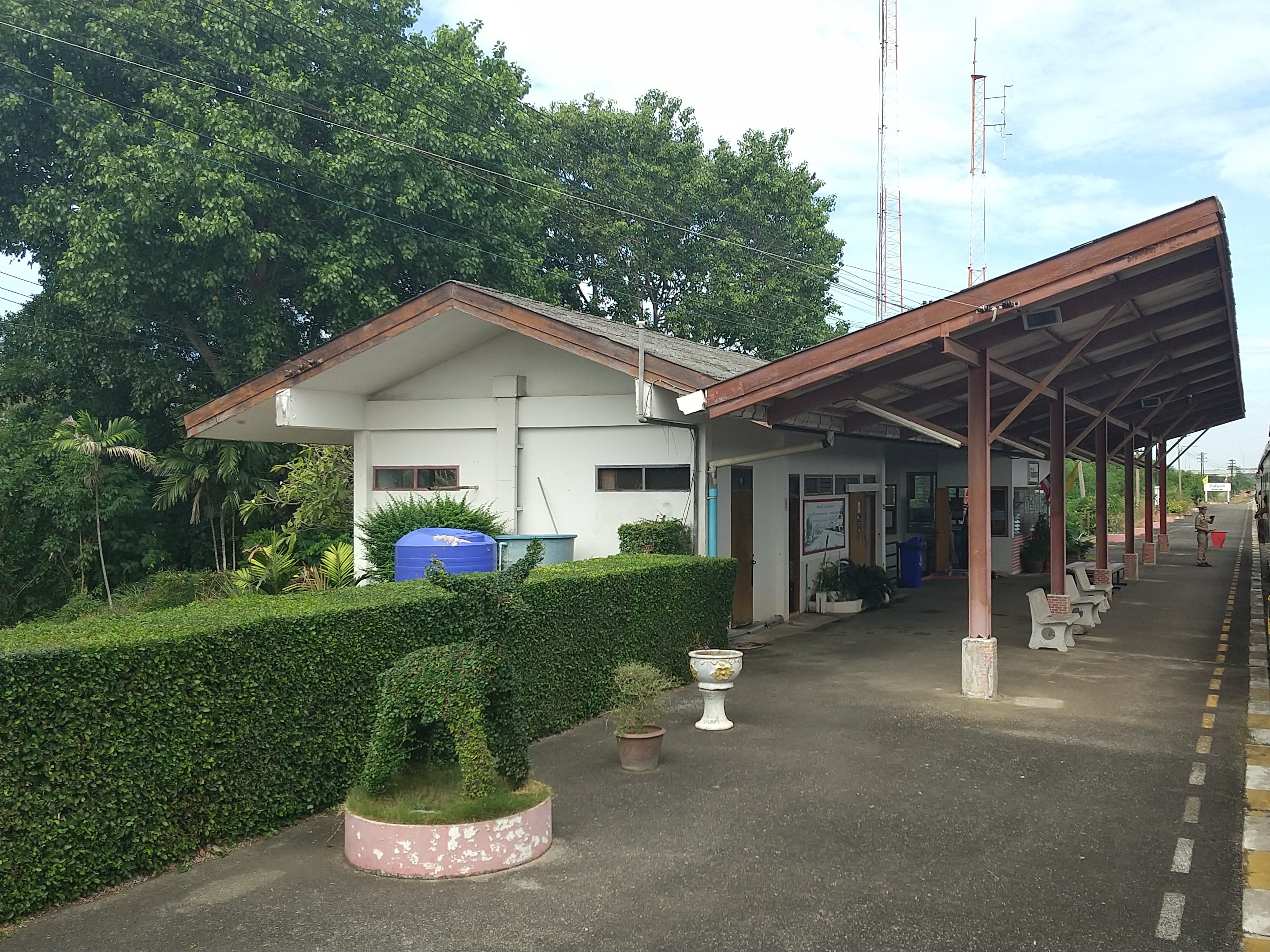

General information
- Location: Huai Yai Subdistrict, Bang Lamung District; Chonburi Province; Thailand
- Coordinates: 12.8263°N 100.9213°E
- Operator: State Railway of Thailand
- Manager: Ministry of Transport
- Line: Chuk Samet Main Line
- Platforms: 1
- Tracks: 2

Construction
- Structure type: At-grade

Other information
- Station code: ยข.
- Classification: Class 3

History
- Opened: July 1989

Services
Preceding station	State Railway of Thailand	Following station
Pattaya Floating Market Halt towards Hua Lamphong	Eastern Line	Yansangwararam towards Chuk Samet
Location

Ban Huai Khwang station (Thai: สถานีบ้านห้วยขวาง) is a railway station located in Huai Yai Subdistrict, Bang Lamung District, Chonburi Province. It is a class 3 railway station located 168.34 km (104.6 mi) from Bangkok railway station.
