= Chulabhorn district =

District of Thailand

Chulabhorn จุฬาภรณ์
- District
- District location in Nakhon Si Thammarat province
- Coordinates: 8°4′30″N 99°52′12″E
- Country: Thailand
- Province: Nakhon Si Thammarat
- Seat: Sam Tambon

Area
  - Total: 192.505 km^{2} (74.327 sq mi)

Population (2015)
  - Total: 31,481
  - Density: 159.3/km^{2} (413/sq mi)
- Time zone: UTC+7 (ICT)
- Postal code: 80130
- Geocode: 8019

Chulabhorn (Thai: จุฬาภรณ์) is a district (amphoe) of Nakhon Si Thammarat province, southern Thailand.

The district was named in honour of Princess Chulabhorn, the youngest daughter of King Bhumibol Adulyadej, on her 36th birthday.

== History ==
The district was created on 7 March 1994 by merging the two tambons, Ban Khuan Mut and Ban Cha-uat of Cha-uat district and the four tambons Khuan Nong Khwa, Thung Pho, Na Mo Bun, and Sam Tambon of Ron Phibun district.

== Geography ==
Neighboring districts are (from the north clockwise): Ron Phibun, Cha-uat, and Thung Song.

== Administration ==
=== Central administration ===
Chulabhorn is divided into six sub-districts (tambons), which are further subdivided into 30 administrative villages (mubans).

No.	Name	Thai	Villages	Pop.
1.	Ban Khuan Mut	บ้านควนมุด	2	1,592
2.	Ban Cha-uat	บ้านชะอวด	4	2,708
3.	Khuan Nong Khwa	ควนหนองคว้า	4	3,305
4.	Thung Pho	ทุ่งโพธิ์	8	9,737
5.	Na Mo Bun	นาหมอบุญ	6	7,112
6.	Sam Tambon	สามตำบล	6	7,027

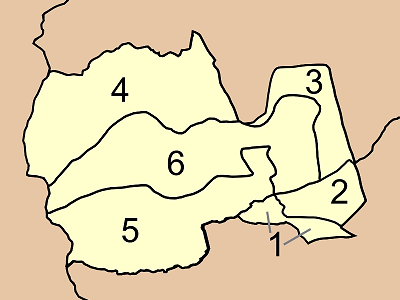

=== Local administration ===
There are five sub-district administrative organizations (SAO) in the district:

- Ban Cha-uat (Thai: องค์การบริหารส่วนตำบลบ้านชะอวด) consisting of sub-districts Ban Khuan Mut and Ban Cha-uat.
- Khuan Nong Khwa (Thai: องค์การบริหารส่วนตำบลควนหนองคว้า) consisting of sub-district Khuan Nong Khwa.
- Thung Pho (Thai: องค์การบริหารส่วนตำบลทุ่งโพธิ์) consisting of sub-district Thung Pho.
- Na Mo Bun (Thai: องค์การบริหารส่วนตำบลนาหมอบุญ) consisting of sub-district Na Mo Bun.
- Sam Tambon (Thai: องค์การบริหารส่วนตำบลสามตำบล) consisting of sub-district Sam Tambon.
