= Watthana Nakhon railway station =

Railway station in Thailand

Watthana Nakhon วัฒนานคร

General information
- Location: Watthana Nakhon Subdistrict, Watthana Nakhon District; Sa Kaeo Province; Thailand
- Coordinates: 13.7412°N 102.3231°E
- Operator: State Railway of Thailand
- Manager: Ministry of Transport
- Platforms: 1
- Tracks: 2

Construction
- Structure type: At-grade

Other information
- Station code: วค.
- Classification: Class 3

Services
| Preceding station | State Railway of Thailand | Following station |
|---|---|---|
| Huai Chot Halt towards Hua Lamphong | Eastern Line | Ban Pong Kom Halt towards Poipet (Cambodia) |
Location

Watthana Nakhon railway station is a railway station located in Watthana Nakhon Subdistrict, Watthana Nakhon District, Sa Kaeo Province. It is a class 3 railway station located 233.86 km (145.3 mi) from Bangkok railway station.
