= Phra Phrom district =

District of Thailand

Phra Phrom พระพรหม
- District
- District location in Nakhon Si Thammarat province
- Country: Thailand
- Time zone: UTC+7 (ICT)

Phra Phrom (Thai: พระพรหม, pronounced [pʰráʔ pʰrōm]) is a district (amphoe) of Nakhon Si Thammarat province, southern Thailand.

== Geography ==
Neighboring districts are (from the north clockwise): Mueang Nakhon Si Thammarat, Chaloem Phra Kiat, Ron Phibun, and Lan Saka.

== History ==
The district was created as a minor district (king amphoe) on 30 April 1994 by splitting off four tambons from Mueang Nakhon Si Thammarat district. On 11 October 1997 the minor district was upgraded to a full district.

== Administration ==
The district is divided into four sub-districts (tambons), which are further subdivided into 38 villages (mubans). There are no municipal (thesaban) areas, and four tambon administrative organizations (TAO).

No.	Name	Thai name	Villages	Pop.
1.	Na Phru	นาพรุ	7	7,539
2.	Na San	นาสาร	7	9,906
3.	Thai Samphao	ท้ายสำเภา	12	13,105
4.	Chang Sai	ช้างซ้าย	12	11,224

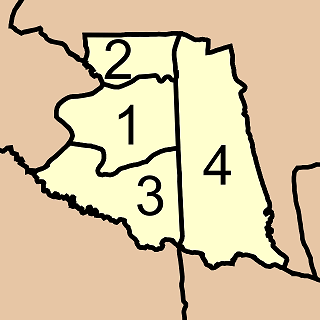
