= Nong Sang railway station =

Railway station in Thailand

Nong Sang หนองสัง

General information
- Location: Ban Na Subdistrict, Kabin Buri District, Prachinburi Province
- Coordinates: 13.9807°N 101.8254°E
- Owner: State Railway of Thailand
- Line: Eastern Line
- Platforms: 1
- Tracks: 3

Other information
- Station code: อส.

Services
Preceding station	State Railway of Thailand	Following station
Kabin Kao Halt towards Hua Lamphong	Eastern Line	Phra Prong Halt towards Poipet (Cambodia)
Location

Nong Sang railway station is a railway station located in Ban Na Subdistrict, Kabin Buri District, Prachinburi Province. It is a class 3 railway station located 172.71 km (107.3 mi) from Bangkok railway station.
