= Khlong Bang Phra railway station =

Railway station in Chachoengsao, Thailand

Khlong Bang Phra คลองบางพระ
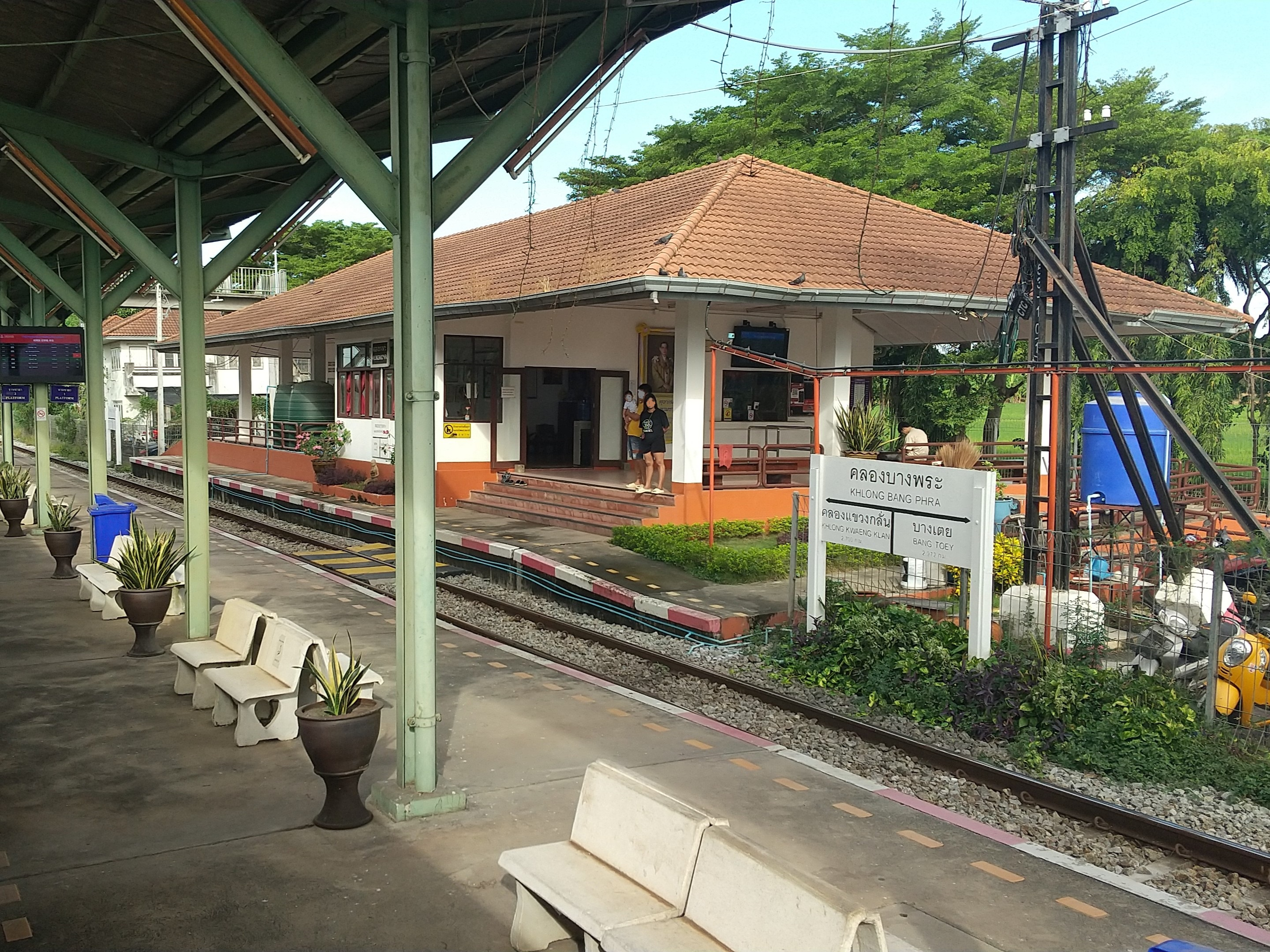

General information
- Location: Bang Toei Subdistrict, Mueang Chachoengsao District, Chachoengsao Province
- Coordinates: 13.7042°N 100.9914°E
- Owner: State Railway of Thailand
- Line: Eastern Line
- Platforms: 3
- Tracks: 3

Other information
- Station code: คบ.

Services
Preceding station	State Railway of Thailand	Following station
Khlong Kwaeng Klan Halt towards Hua Lamphong	Eastern Line	Bang Toei Halt towards Chuk Samet or Poipet (Cambodia)
Location

Khlong Bang Phra railway station is a railway station located in Bang Toei Subdistrict, Mueang Chachoengsao District, Chachoengsao Province. It is a class 3 railway station located 53.99 km (33.5 mi) from Bangkok railway station.
