= Khong district, Nakhon Ratchasima =

Khong คง
- District
- District location in Nakhon Ratchasima province
- Coordinates: 15°26′29″N 102°19′43″E
- Country: Thailand
- Province: Nakhon Ratchasima
- Seat: Mueang Khong

Area
  - Total: 454.7 km^{2} (175.6 sq mi)

Population (2000)
  - Total: 81,484
  - Density: 179.2/km^{2} (464/sq mi)
- Time zone: UTC+7 (ICT)
- Postal code: 30260
- Geocode: 3004

Khong (Thai: คง, pronounced [kʰōŋ]) is a district (amphoe) in the northern part of Nakhon Ratchasima province, northeastern Thailand.

== History ==
The name of the district originates from the founding legend of its main settlement. A hunter named Khong was the pioneer of the town. He invited people to settle the new town in this fertile land. The people named the town Mueang Khong. Later the government removed Mueang from the district name to prevent confusion with Amphoe Mueang.

The area became a sub-district (king amphoe) of Bua Yai district in 1938. It was upgraded to a full district in 1947.

== Geography ==
Neighbouring districts are (from the north clockwise): Ban Lueam, Bua Yai, Non Daeng, Phimai, Non Sung, Kham Sakaesaeng, and Phra Thong Kham district of Nakhon Ratchasima Province, and Noen Sa-nga of Chaiyaphum province.

== Administration ==
The district is divided into 10 sub-districts (tambons). There are two townships (thesaban tambons), Mueang Khong and Thephalai, each covering part of the same-named tambon.

1.	Mueang Khong	เมืองคง
2.	Khu Khat	คูขาด
3.	Thephalai	เทพาลัย
4.	Ta Chan	ตาจั่น
5.	Ban Prang	บ้านปรางค์
6.	Nong Manao	หนองมะนาว
7.	Nong Bua	หนองบัว
8.	Non Teng	โนนเต็ง
9.	Don Yai	ดอนใหญ่
10.	Kham Sombun	ขามสมบูรณ์
