= List of Southern Line (Thailand) stations =

List of railway stations on Thailand's Southern Line

The following is a list of Southern Line railway stations.

== Stations in operation ==
English name	Thai Name	Number Code	Distance from Bangkok in km	Class	Station Code	Notes	Location
Bangkok - Taling Chan Junction
Bangkok	กรุงเทพ	1001	0.00	1	กท.		Bangkok
Yommarat	ยมราช	1002	2.17	Halt	ยช.	Has wye. Can go to the Eastern Line	Bangkok
Ho Prajae Chit Lada (Chitralada)	หอประแจจิตรลดา		3.29	Special Station	จล.	This station is for Chitralada Royal Villa. Royal use only.	Bangkok
Ramathibodi Hospital	โรงพยาบาลรามาธิบดี	1003	3.3	Halt	รธ.		Bangkok
Sam Sen	สามเสน	1004	4.8	1	สส.		Bangkok
Bang Sue Junction	ชุมทางบางซื่อ	1007	7.47	1	บซ.	Has interchange to The North and Northeastern Line and can go to Phahonyothin Freight Terminal	Bangkok
Bang Son	บางซ่อน	4006	12.91	Halt	ซอ.		Bangkok
Bang Bamru	บางบำหรุ	4005	17.94	2	บำ.		Bangkok
Taling Chan Junction	ชุมทางตลิ่งชัน	4004	22.14	2	ตช.	Has interchange to the Thon Buri Branch Line. Distance measured from Bangkok railway station	Bangkok
Thon Buri - Su-ngai Kolok
Thon Buri	ธนบุรี	4002	0.87	1	ธบ.	Distance measured from defunct Bangkok Noi (old Thon Buri) Station	Bangkok
Charansanitwong	จรัญสนิทวงศ์	4434	1.54	Halt	รว.		Bangkok
Bang Ramat	บางระมาด	4003	4.30	Halt	รม.		Bangkok
Taling Chan Junction	ชุมทางตลิ่งชัน	4004	6.09	2	ตช.	Has interchange to Bang Sue Branch Line. Distance measured from defunct Bangkok Noi (old Thon Buri) Station	Bangkok
Ban Chimphli	บ้านฉิมพลี	4007	8.64	Halt	ฉพ.		Bangkok
Phutthamonthon Sai 2	พุทธมณฑล สาย 2	4442	11.47	Halt	ทล.		Bangkok
Sala Thammasop	ศาลาธรรมสพน์	4008	14.05	3	ทพ.		Bangkok
Salaya	ศาลายา	4009	19.08	1	ลย.		Nakhon Pathom
Wat Suwan	วัดสุวรรณ	4010	23.47	3	สุ.		Nakhon Pathom
Khlong Maha Sawat	คลองมหาสวัสดิ์	4011	27.05	3	มว.		Nakhon Pathom
Wat Ngiu Rai	วัดงิ้วราย	4012	30.80	2	งร.		Nakhon Pathom
Nakhon Chai Si	นครชัยศรี	4013	35.18	2	รช.		Nakhon Pathom
Tha Chalaep	ท่าแฉลบ	4014	40.02	3	ฉล.		Nakhon Pathom
Ton Samrong	ต้นสำโรง	4015	44.30	3	โร.		Nakhon Pathom
Nakhon Pathom	นครปฐม	4016	48.13	1	คฐ.		Nakhon Pathom
Sanam Chandra Palace	พระราชวังสนามจันทร์	4017	49.80	Halt	สจ.		Nakhon Pathom
Phrong Maduea	โพรงมะเดื่อ	4018	55.37	3	พด.		Nakhon Pathom
Khlong Bang Tan	คลองบางตาล	4019	59.00	3	บา.		Ratchaburi
Nong Pladuk Junction	ชุมทางหนองปลาดุก	4020	64.20	3	ปด.	Has interchange to Suphan Buri Line and Burma Railway (Nam Tok Line).	Ratchaburi
Ban Pong	บ้านโป่ง	4079	68.23	1	โป.		Ratchaburi
Nakhon Chum	นครชุมน์	4081	73.70	3	นช.		Ratchaburi
Khlong Ta Khot	คลองตาคด	4082	77.29	3	ตค.		Ratchaburi
Photharam	โพธาราม	4083	81.80	1	พร.		Ratchaburi
Chet Samian	เจ็ดเสมียน	4085	88.88	3	จม.		Ratchaburi
Ban Kluay	บ้านกล้วย	4087	94.64	3	าก.		Ratchaburi
Saphan Chulalongkorn	สะพานจุฬาลงกรณ์	4088	100.14	Halt	จา.		Ratchaburi
Ratchaburi	ราชบุรี	4089	101.32	1	รร.		Ratchaburi
Ban Khu Bua	บ้านคูบัว	4090	105.46	3	บบ.		Ratchaburi
Bo Takhro	บ่อตะคร้อ	4091	111.21	3	บร.		Ratchaburi
Ban Pa Kai	บ้านป่าไก่	4092	114.50	Halt	ไป.		Ratchaburi
Pak Tho	ปากท่อ	4093	118.63	2	ปท.		Ratchaburi
Huai Rong	ห้วยโรง	4094	122.78	Halt	โง.		Phetchaburi
Bang Khem	บางเค็ม	4095	127.19	3	งเ.		Phetchaburi
Khao Yoi	เขาย้อย	4097	133.77	3	เข.		Phetchaburi
Nong Pla Lai	หนองปลาไหล	4098	139.44	3	ปล.		Phetchaburi
Bang Chak	บางจาก	4099	143.90	3	จก.		Phetchaburi
Phetchaburi	เพชรบุรี	4101	150.49	1	พบ.		Phetchaburi
Khao Thamon	เขาทโมน	4104	160.32	3	โม.		Phetchaburi
Nong Mai Luang	หนองไม้เหลือง	4105	164.21	3	นม.		Phetchaburi
Nong Chok	หนองจอก	4107	169.90	3	หจ.		Phetchaburi
Nong Sala	หนองศาลา	4108	175.41	3	งา.		Phetchaburi
Cha-am	ชะอำ	4111	187.07	2	ชอ.		Phetchaburi
Huai Sai Nua	ห้วยทรายเหนือ	4114	197.86	3	ซน.		Phetchaburi
Huai Sai Tai	ห้วยทรายใต้	4115	201.64	3	ซใ.		Phetchaburi
Hua Hin	หัวหิน	4118	212.99	1	หห.		Prachuap Khiri Khan
Nong Kae	หนองแก	4119	216.96	3	นอ.		Prachuap Khiri Khan
Suan Son Pradiphat	สวนสนประดิพัทธ์	4120	221.03	3	สป.		Prachuap Khiri Khan
Khao Tao	เขาเต่า	4121	225.40	3	ขต.		Prachuap Khiri Khan
Wang Phong	วังก์พง	4123	232.92	3	วพ.		Prachuap Khiri Khan
Pran Buri	ปราณบุรี	4124	235.86	2	ปน.		Prachuap Khiri Khan
Huai Khwang	ห้วยขวาง	4125	241.93	Halt	ขว.		Prachuap Khiri Khan
Nong Khang	หนองคาง	4126	246.95	3	อค.		Prachuap Khiri Khan
Sam Roi Yot	สามร้อยยอด	4128	255.00	3	สย.		Prachuap Khiri Khan
Sam Krathai	สามกระทาย	4130	261.16	3	สท.		Prachuap Khiri Khan
Kui Buri	กุยบุรี	4133	271.34	2	กย.		Prachuap Khiri Khan
Bo Nok	บ่อนอก	4135	278.85	3	บน.		Prachuap Khiri Khan
Thung Mamao	ทุ่งมะเม่า	4138	289.03	3	มเ.		Prachuap Khiri Khan
Khan Kradai	คั่นกระได	4140	294.77	3	กด.		Prachuap Khiri Khan
Prachuap Khiri Khan	ประจวบคีรีขันธ์	4142	302.34	1	จข.		Prachuap Khiri Khan
Nong Hin	หนองหิน	4144	310.37	3	นห.		Prachuap Khiri Khan
Whagor	หว้ากอ	4145	313.42	Halt	ห ้.		Prachuap Khiri Khan
Wang Duan	วังด้วน	4146	318.27	3	วด.		Prachuap Khiri Khan
Huai Yang	ห้วยยาง	4149	329.08	3	หย.		Prachuap Khiri Khan
Thung Pradu	ทุ่งประดู่	4152	338.60	3	ทด.		Prachuap Khiri Khan
Thap Sakae	ทับสะแก	4153	342.07	2	สก.		Prachuap Khiri Khan
Don Sai	ดอนทราย	4154	347.01	3	ดซ.		Prachuap Khiri Khan
Khok Ta Hom	โคกตาหอม	4156	353.04	Halt	โห.		Prachuap Khiri Khan
Ban Krut	บ้านกรูด	4158	360.54	3	กร.		Prachuap Khiri Khan
Nong Mongkhon	หนองมงคล	4159	365.86	Halt	หน.		Prachuap Khiri Khan
Na Phak Khuang	นาผักขวง	4161	371.04	3	ผข.		Prachuap Khiri Khan
Bang Saphan Yai	บางสะพานใหญ่	4163	376.53	2	พญ.		Prachuap Khiri Khan
Hin Gong	หินกอง	4164	383.58	Halt	หก.		Prachuap Khiri Khan
Cha Muang	ชะม่วง	4165	385.93	3	ชว.		Prachuap Khiri Khan
Bang Saphan Noi	บางสะพานน้อย	4167	392.66	2	พน.		Prachuap Khiri Khan
Huai Sak	ห้วยสัก	4169	399.93	3	ยส.		Prachuap Khiri Khan
Ban Sai Thong	บ้านทรายทอง	4170	404.30	Halt	ซท.		Prachuap Khiri Khan
Khao Chaiyarat	เขาไชยราช	4172	409.66	3	ขช.		Chumphon
Map Ammarit	มาบอำมฤต	4175	420.60	2	มร.		Chumphon
Ban Sap Somboon	บ้านทรัพย์สมบูรณ์	4177	427.67	Halt	ซส.		Chumphon
Khlong Wang Chang	คลองวังช้าง	4178	434.29	3	คช.		Chumphon
Pathio	ปะทิว	4179	439.34	2	ะท.		Chumphon
Ban Khok Ma	บ้านคอกม้า	4181	447.46	3	คา.		Chumphon
Saphli	สะพลี	4182	453.80	3	สี.		Chumphon
Nong Nian	หนองเนียน	4183	458.38	Halt	งน.		Chumphon
Na Cha-ang	นาชะอัง	4184	463.20	3	ชง.		Chumphon
Chumphon	ชุมพร	4186	468.53	1	ชพ.		Chumphon
Saeng Daet	แสงแดด	4187	472.55	3	สด.		Chumphon
Thung Kha	ทุ่งคา	4189	480.91	3	ทค.		Chumphon
Wisai	วิสัย	4191	489.98	3	ไส.		Chumphon
Ban Khron	บ้านครน	4192	495.76	Halt	คร.		Chumphon
Sawi	สวี	4194	500.77	2	ะว.		Chumphon
Khao Suan Thurian	เขาสวนทุเรียน	4196	508.52	3	ขร.		Chumphon
Khao Pip	เขาปีบ	4197	511.32	Halt	ขป.		Chumphon
Pak Tako	ปากตะโก	4199	516.81	3	ตก.		Chumphon
Tha Thong	ท่าทอง	4200	522.30	Halt	ทอ.		Chumphon
Khuan Hin Mui	ควนหินมุ้ย	4201	526.09	3	มย.		Chumphon
Lang Suan	หลังสวน	4203	533.30	1	งส.		Chumphon
Khlong Khanan	คลองขนาน	4205	541.03	3	คข.		Chumphon
Hua Mat	หัวมาด	4206	546.53	Halt	มั.		Chumphon
Lamae	ละแม	4208	553.70	2	แม.		Chumphon
Ban Duat	บ้านดวด	4210	560.15	3	ดว.		Chumphon
Khanthuli	คันธุลี	4212	566.37	3	คล.		Surat Thani
Don Thup	ดอนธูป	4213	570.06	3	ดธ.		Surat Thani
Tha Chana	ท่าชนะ	4215	577.79	2	นะ.		Surat Thani
Ban Ko Muk	บ้านเกาะมุกข์	4217	584.06	Halt	ะม.		Surat Thani
Khao Phanom Baek	เขาพนมแบก	4218	588.40	3	ขบ.		Surat Thani
Chaiya	ไชยา	4221	597.72	1	ชย.		Surat Thani
Tha Chang	ท่าฉาง	4224	610.54	2	ทฉ.		Surat Thani
Khlong Khut	คลองขุด	4225	614.00	Halt	ขด.		Surat Thani
Khlong Sye	คลองไทร	4226	618.88	3	คไ.		Surat Thani
Maluan	มะลวน	4227	623.93	3	ลว.		Surat Thani
Ban Thung Pho Junction	ชุมทางบ้านทุ่งโพธิ์	4229	631.00	2	ทโ.	Has interchange to Khiri Rat Nikhom Branch Line	Surat Thani
Surat Thani	สุราษฎร์ธานี	4239	635.11	1	รท.		Surat Thani
Khao Hua Khwai	เขาหัวควาย	4241	641.52	3	ขค.		Surat Thani
Bo Krang	บ่อกรัง	4243	647.24	Halt	กง.		Surat Thani
Khao Phlu	เขาพลู	4245	652.467	3	ขพ.		Surat Thani
Khlong Ya	คลองยา	4246	657.77	Halt	ยา.		Surat Thani
Ban Na	บ้านนา	4247	662.35	2	นน.		Surat Thani
Huai Mut	ห้วยมุด	4249	669.68	3	มด.		Surat Thani
Na San	นาสาร	4250	673.75	2	นส.		Surat Thani
Khlong Prap	คลองปราบ	4252	679.90	Halt	ปบ.		Surat Thani
Phruphi	พรุพี	4253	684.04	3	พพ.		Surat Thani
Khlong Sun	คลองสูญ	4254	687.73	Halt	คู.		Surat Thani
Ban Song	บ้านส้อง	4255	692.74	2	สอ.		Surat Thani
Ban Phru Krachaeng	บ้านพรุกระแชง	4257	699.78	3	แช.		Surat Thani
Huai Prik	ห้วยปริก	4258	704.61	3	หป.		Nakhon Si Thammarat
Krabiat	กระเบียด	4259	709.88	3	เบ.		Nakhon Si Thammarat
Than Pho	ทานพอ	4261	716.67	3	ทา.		Nakhon Si Thammarat
Chawang	ฉวาง	4262	722.42	2	ฉว.		Nakhon Si Thammarat
Khlong Chandi	คลองจันดี	4264	727.95	2	จด.		Nakhon Si Thammarat
Pho Than Klai Wachasit	พ่อท่านคล้ายวาจาสิทธิ์	4265	728.98	Halt	วจ.	Opened 10 October 2020.	Nakhon Si Thammarat
Lak Chang	หลักช้าง	4266	734.72	3	หช.		Nakhon Si Thammarat
Khlong Kui	คลองกุย	4267	738.90	Halt	อก.		Nakhon Si Thammarat
Na Bon	นาบอน	4268	743.02	2	าอ.		Nakhon Si Thammarat
Khlong Chang	คลองจัง	4269	747.04	3	คจ.		Nakhon Si Thammarat
Ban Ko Pring	บ้านเกาะปริง	4433	751.03	Halt	ะป.		Nakhon Si Thammarat
Thung Song Junction	ชุมทางทุ่งสง	4270	757.08	1	ทส.	Has interchange to Kantang Branch Line	Nakhon Si Thammarat
Sai Yai	ใสใหญ่	4295	762.00	3	สใ.		Nakhon Si Thammarat
Chong Khao	ช่องเขา	4297	767.79	3	ชข.		Nakhon Si Thammarat
Chong Khao Tunnel length 235.90 m
Ron Phibun	ร่อนพิบูลย์	4299	776.33	2	รบ.		Nakhon Si Thammarat
Khao Chum Thong Junction	ชุมทางเขาชุมทอง	4300	781.02	2	ชท.	Has interchange to Nakhon Si Thammarat Branch Line	Nakhon Si Thammarat
Khuan Nong Khwa	ควนหนองคว้า	4310	789.38	3	คว.		Nakhon Si Thammarat
Ban Tun	บ้านตูล	4312	794.95	3	ตน.		Nakhon Si Thammarat
Ban Thung Khai	บ้านทุ่งค่าย	4366	802.85	Halt	น ่.		Nakhon Si Thammarat
Cha-uat	ชะอวด	4315	806.07	2	ชด.		Nakhon Si Thammarat
Nong Jik	หนองจิก	4316	810.69	Halt	อจ.		Nakhon Si Thammarat
Ban Nang Long	บ้านนางหลง	4317	813.48	3	นล.		Nakhon Si Thammarat
Ban Trok Kae	บ้านตรอกแค	4435	816.35	Halt	ค้.		Nakhon Si Thammarat
Ban Khon Hat	บ้านขอนหาด	4318	818.96	3	ขห.		Nakhon Si Thammarat
Laem Tanot	แหลมโตนด	4319	824.06	3	โน.		Phatthalung
Ban Sunthra	บ้านสุนทรา	4320	829.03	Halt	บท.		Phatthalung
Pak Khlong	ปากคลอง	4321	833.12	3	ปค.		Phatthalung
Ban Makok Tai	บ้านมะกอกใต้	4323	837.06	Halt	บใ.		Phatthalung
Chai Buri	ชัยบุรี	4324	839.97	Halt	ไช.		Phatthalung
Phatthalung	พัทลุง	4325	846.01	1	พท.		Phatthalung
Na Prue	นาปรือ	4326	849.07	Halt	ปร.		Phatthalung
Ban Khai Thai	บ้านค่ายไทย	4327	853.19	Halt	ทย.		Phatthalung
Ban Ton Don	บ้านต้นโดน	4328	856.15	3	บโ.		Phatthalung
Ban Huai Taen	บ้านห้วยแตน	4329	859.25	Halt	ยแ.		Phatthalung
Khao Chaison	เขาชัยสน	4330	865.02	2	เช.		Phatthalung
Bang Kaeo	บางแก้ว	4331	870.18	2	แก.		Phatthalung
Khuan Phra	ควนพระ	4333	876.50	Halt	คะ.		Phatthalung
Khuan Khiam	ควนเคี่ยม	4334	881.15	3	คเ.		Phatthalung
Han Kong	หารกง	4335	885.35	Halt	ฮก.		Phatthalung
Han Thao	หารเทา	4336	888.69	3	หท.		Phatthalung
Wat Khuan Phayer	วัดควนเผยอ	4337	893.49	Halt	วผ.		Phatthalung
Khok Sai	โคกทราย	4338	896.24	3	โท.		Phatthalung
Khuan Niang	ควนเนียง	4340	902.97	2	เน.	Has a TPI cement silo	Songkhla
Ban Ko Yai	บ้านเกาะใหญ่	4342	909.50	3	กใ.		Songkhla
Bang Klam	บางกล่ำ	4344	917.02	3	บล.		Songkhla
Ban Din Lan	บ้านดินลาน	4345	921.85	3	ดล.		Songkhla
Hat Yai Junction	ชุมทางหาดใหญ่	4347	928.59	1	หา.	Has interchange to Padang Besar Branch Line (towards Butterworth, KL and Singapore)	Songkhla
Na Muang	นาม่วง	4377	940.26	3	มง.		Songkhla
Wat Khuan Mit	วัดควนมีด	4381	953.76	3	วม.		Songkhla
Chana	จะนะ	4384	964.50	1	จน.		Songkhla
Tha Maenglak	ท่าแมงลัก	4386	972.11	3	งก.		Songkhla
Ko Saba	เกาะสะบ้า	4388	980.80	3	กส.		Songkhla
Thepha	เทพา	4391	991.99	1	เท.		Songkhla
Ta Paet	ตาแปด	4393	999.91	3	ตป.		Songkhla
Ban Nikhom	บ้านนิคม	4394	1003.28	Halt	นิ.		Pattani
Pattani (Khok Pho)	ปัตตานี(โคกโพธิ์)	4395	1009.21	1	นี.		Pattani
Na Pradu	นาประดู่	4397	1016.73	3	าด.		Pattani
Wat Chang Hai	วัดช้างให้	4437	1019.89	3	ชห.		Pattani
Pa Rai	ป่าไร่	4398	1021.30	Halt	ปไ.		Pattani
Khlong Sai	คลองทราย	4399	1026.07	3	คซ.		Pattani
Tase	ตาเซะ	4400	1031.59	3	ตซ.		Yala
Yala	ยะลา	4402	1038.74	1	ยล.		Yala
Mai Kaen	ไม้แก่น	4405	1048.80	3	ไม.		Yala
Ban Patae	บ้านปาแต	4406	1051.96	Halt	ตแ.		Yala
Raman	รามัน	4408	1056.82	1	รั.		Yala
Balo	บาลอ	4409	1061.71	3	าล.		Yala
Rueso	รือเสาะ	4411	1071.19	1	สะ.		Narathiwat
Ban Salo Bukit Yuaerae	บ้านสะโลว์บูกิ๊ตยือแร	4412	1078.00	Halt	ยื.		Narathiwat
Lalo	ลาโละ	4414	1081.78	3	ลล.		Narathiwat
Maruebo	มะรือโบ	4416	1089.47	2	โบ.		Narathiwat
Kadae	กะแด๊ะ	4417	1093.91	Halt	กแ.		Narathiwat
Tanyong Mat	ตันหยงมัส	4419	1099.50	1	ยม.		Narathiwat
Pa Phai	ป่าไผ่	4421	1105.45	3	ปผ.		Narathiwat
Cho-airong	เจาะไอร้อง	4423	1111.15	2	จอ.		Narathiwat
Bukit	บูกิต	4424	1115.83	3	บู.		Narathiwat
Ai Satia	ไอสะเตีย	4425	1119.63	Halt	ไอ.		Narathiwat
To Deng	โต๊ะเด็ง	4427	1125.66	3	ตด.		Narathiwat
Su-ngai Padi	สุไหงปาดี	4428	1130.10	2	งด.		Narathiwat
Khok Saya	โคกสยา	4430	1137.14	Halt	โย.		Narathiwat
Su-ngai Kolok	สุไหงโกลก	4432	1142.99	1	โล.	Railway line to Rantau Panjang exists but defunct	Narathiwat
Nong Pladuk Junction - Suphanburi
Nong Pladuk Junction	ชุมทางหนองปลาดุก	4020	64.20	3	ปด.	Has interchange with Southern Line Mainline and Burma Railway	Ratchaburi
Thung Bua	ทุ่งบัว	4026	87.87	Halt	วบ.		Nakhon Pathom
Aviation Academy (Rong Rien Kanbin)	โรงเรียนการบิน	4028	96.46	Halt	ริ.		Nakhon Pathom
Sri Samran	ศรีสำราญ	4033	113.30	Halt	สญ.		Suphan Buri
Don Thong	ดอนทอง	4036	122.31	Halt	ดถ.		Suphan Buri
Suphanburi	สุพรรณบุรี	4042	141.60	2	สพ.		Suphan Buri
Ma Lai Maen	มาลัยแมน		143.63	Halt		Not officially a terminus, but train services usually terminate here as it is closer to the main road and city centre.	Suphan Buri
Nong Pladuk Junction - Kanchanaburi
Nong Pladuk Junction	ชุมทางหนองปลาดุก	4020	64.20	3	ปด.	Has interchange with Southern Line Mainline and Suphan Buri Line	Ratchaburi
Thanon Songpol	ถนนทรงพล	4043	67.91	Halt	ซง.		Ratchaburi
Sa Kosi Narai	สระโกสินารายณ์	4044	73.66	3	สโ.		Ratchaburi
Luk Kae	ลูกแก	4045	77.43	3	ลแ.		Kanchanaburi
Tha Ruea Noi	ท่าเรือน้อย	4048	89.78	3	ทน.		Kanchanaburi
Ban Nong Sua	บ้านหนองเสือ	4050	96.68	Halt	บส.		Kanchanaburi
Tha Muang	ท่าม่วง	4051	100.34	3	าม.		Kanchanaburi
Thung Thong	ทุ่งทอง	4052	102.71	Halt	ทุ.		Kanchanaburi
Pak Phraek	ปากแพรก	4055	114.36	Halt	ปแ.		Kanchanaburi
Kanchanaburi	กาญจนบุรี	4057	117.05	1	กญ.		Kanchanaburi
Saphan Khwae Yai	สะพานแควใหญ่	4058	120.02	Halt	แค.		Kanchanaburi
Khao Pun	เขาปูน	4059	121.50	Halt	เป.		Kanchanaburi
Wang Lan	วังลาน	4061	132.70	Halt	วน.		Kanchanaburi
Na Kann	นากาญจน์	4062	136.46	Halt	นญ.		Kanchanaburi
Wang Yen	วังเย็น	4063	140.15	3	วย.		Kanchanaburi
Wang Takhian	วังตะเคียน	4064	144.80	Halt	วเ.		Kanchanaburi
Ban Pong Sieo	บ้านโป่งเสี้ยว	4065	148.17	Halt	ปเ.		Kanchanaburi
Ban Kao	บ้านเก่า	4066	151.95	Halt	าน.		Kanchanaburi
Tha Ta Sua	ท่าตาเสือ	4067	156.80	Halt	ตส.		Kanchanaburi
Tha Kilen	ท่ากิเลน	4069	161.95	3	กน.		Kanchanaburi
Wang Sing	วังสิงห์	4070	167.04	Halt	วห.		Kanchanaburi
Lumsum	ลุ่มสุ่ม	4071	172.35	Halt	ลุ.		Kanchanaburi
Saphan Tham Krasae	สะพานถ้ำกระแซ	4072	173.87	Halt	แซ.	Actually two halts (one on each side of the Tham Krasae viaduct)	Kanchanaburi
Wang Pho	วังโพ	4073	178.10	3	วง.		Kanchanaburi
Ko Maha Mongkol	เกาะมหามงคล	4074	183.66	Halt	กง.		Kanchanaburi
Chong Khaep	ช่องแคบ	4075	185.35	Halt	อบ.		Kanchanaburi
Wang Yai	วังใหญ่	4076	188.90	Halt	วใ.		Kanchanaburi
Ban Pu Pong	บ้านพุพง	4436	191.25	Halt	พุ.		Kanchanaburi
Nam Tok	น้ำตก	4077	194.24	2	าต.		Kanchanaburi
Nam Tok Sai Yok Noi	น้ำตกไทรโยคน้อย		195.6	Halt		Excursion Trains only	
Ban Thung Pho Junction - Khiri Rat Nikhom
Ban Thung Pho Junction	ชุมทางบ้านทุ่งโพธิ์	4229	631.00	2	ทโ.	Has interchange with Southern Line Mainline	Surat Thani
Ban Don Rak	บ้านดอนรัก	4230	634.35	Halt	รก.		Surat Thani
Ban Thung Luang	บ้านทุ่งหลวง	4232	640.75	Halt	าว.		Surat Thani
Ban Khanai	บ้านขนาย	4233	644.55	Halt	าย.		Surat Thani
Ban Don Riap	บ้านดอนเรียบ	4234	649.35	Halt	ดเ.		Surat Thani
Khlong Yan	คลองยัน	4235	652.60	Halt	คอ.		Surat Thani
Khao Lung	เขาหลุง	4236	655.58	Halt	ขุ.		Surat Thani
Ban Yang	บ้านยาง	4237	658.00	Halt	ง้.		Surat Thani
Khiri Rat Nikhom	คีรีรัฐนิคม	4238	662.00	3	รค.		Surat Thani
Thung Song Junction - Kantang
Thung Song Junction	ชุมทางทุ่งสง	4270	757.08	1	ทส.	Has interchange with Southern Line Mainline	Nakhon Si Thammarat
Thi Wang	ที่วัง	4272	765.57	3	ทว.		Nakhon Si Thammarat
Kapang	กะปาง	4275	776.33	Halt	กป.		Trang
Huai Yot	ห้วยยอด	4281	800.83	2	ยอ.		Trang
Trang	ตรัง	4289	829.28	1	ตร.		Trang
Kantang	กันตัง	4294	850.08	3	กต.		Trang
Khao Chum Thong Junction - Nakhon Si Thammarat
Khao Chum Thong Junction	ชุมทางเขาชุมทอง	4300	781.02	2	ชท.	Has interchange with Southern Line Mainline	Nakhon Si Thammarat
Ban Koei Chen	บ้านเกยเชน	4301	786.15	Halt	กช.		Nakhon Si Thammarat
Ban Thung Lo	บ้านทุ่งหล่อ	4302	790.59	3	ลอ.		Nakhon Si Thammarat
Khok Khram	โคกคราม	4303	794.68	3	คค.		Nakhon Si Thammarat
Ban Huai Yoong	บ้านห้วยยูง	4304	798.72	Halt	ยู.		Nakhon Si Thammarat
Ban Tha Chang	บ้านท่าช้าง	4305	803.41	Halt	บช.		Nakhon Si Thammarat
Wang Wua	วังวัว	4306	806.36	Halt	วว.		Nakhon Si Thammarat
Mamuang Song Ton	มะม่วงสองต้น	4307	810.88	Halt	สต.		Nakhon Si Thammarat
Nakhon Si Thammarat	นครศรีธรรมราช	4308	816.03	1	ธำ.		Nakhon Si Thammarat
Hat Yai Junction - Padang Besar
Hat Yai Junction	ชุมทางหาดใหญ่	4347	928.59	1	หา.	Has interchange with Southern Line Mainline	Songkhla
Khlong Ngae	คลองแงะ	4358	952.65	3	คง.		Songkhla
Padang Besar (Thai)	ปาดังเบซาร์(ฝั่งไทย)		978	1	ปซ.	Border with Malaysia. New station opened in December 2015.	Songkhla
Padang Besar	ปาดังเบซาร์	4374				Operated by KTM; interchange with KTM West Coast Line	Perlis, Malaysia
English name	Thai Name	Number Code	Distance from Bangkok in km	Class	Station Code	Notes	Location

== Closed Stations ==
=== Main Line ===
Name	Name in Thai	Located between	Province	Notes
Khao Lao	เขาหลาว	Pak Tho–Huai Rong	Ratchaburi	
Huai Sua	ห้วยเสือ	Phetchaburi–Khao Thamon	Phetchaburi	
Nong Taphot	หนองตาพด	Nong Sala–Cha-am	Phetchaburi	
Bo Khaem	บ่อแขม	Cha-am–Huai Sai Nua	Phetchaburi	
Bo Fai	บ่อฝ้าย	Huai Sai Tai–Hua Hin	Prachuap Khiri Khan	
Khao Wor	เขาวอ	Lang Suan–Khlong Khanan	Chumphon	
Bang Nam Jued	บางน้ำจืด	Tha Chang–Khlong Khut Halt	Surat Thani	
Hua Toei	หัวเตย	Maluan–Ban Thung Pho Junction	Surat Thani	
Ban Don Ri	บ้านดอนรี	Maluan–Ban Thung Pho Junction	Surat Thani	
U Taphao Junction	ชุมทางอู่ตะเภา	Ban Din Lan–Hat Yai Junction	Songkhla	Junction for the Songkhla Branch Line, closed due to regular flooding.
Khlong Rian	คลองเรียน	Hat Yai Junction–Na Muang	Songkhla	
Khuan Jong	ควนจง	Hat Yai Junction–Na Muang	Songkhla	
Khuan Pa Ching	ควนป่าชิง	Wat Khuan Mit–Chana	Songkhla	
Ban Yupo	บ้านยุโป	Tase–Yala	Yala	

==== Khiri Rat Nikhom Branch Line ====
Name	Name in Thai	Located between	Province	Notes
Ban Nong Khli	บ้านหนองขรี	Ban Don Rak Halt–Ban Thung Luang Halt	Surat Thani	Signage painted over and used as Khiri Rat Nikhom Line sign seen at Ban Thung Pho Junction

==== Kantang Branch Line ====
Name	Name in Thai	Located between	Province	Notes
Ban Phun	บ้านพูน	Thi Wang–Kapang Halt	Nakhon Si Thammarat	
Khuan Mao	ควนเมา	Kapang Halt–Huai Yot	Trang	
Khlong Muan	คลองมวน	Kapang Halt–Huai Yot	Trang	
Yang Yuan	ยางยวน	Kapang Halt–Huai Yot	Trang	
Lam Phura	ลำภูรา	Huai Yot–Trang	Trang	
Khlong Teng	คลองเต็ง	Huai Yot–Trang	Trang	
Suan Mun	สวนมัน	Huai Yot–Trang	Trang	
Na Po	นาป้อ	Trang–Kantang	Trang	
Phru Yai	พรุใหญ่	Trang–Kantang	Trang	
Ban Pa Ko	บ้านป่ากอ	Trang–Kantang	Trang	
Pa Tiao	ป่าเตียว	Trang–Kantang	Trang	

==== Padang Besar Branch Line ====
Name	Name in Thai	Located between	Province	Notes
Ban Phru	บ้านพรุ	Hat Yai Junction–Khlong Ngae	Songkhla	Signage unremoved
Sala Thung Lung	ศาลาทุ่งลุ่ง	Hat Yai Junction–Khlong Ngae	Songkhla	Converted into community park
Khlong Ram	คลองรำ	Khlong Ngae–Padang Besar (Thai)	Songkhla	Signage unremoved
Ban Tha Khoi	บ้านท่าข่อย	Khlong Ngae–Padang Besar (Thai)	Songkhla	

== See also ==
- Southern Line (Thailand)
- Rail transport in Thailand
