= Khao Hua Khwai railway station =

Railway station in Thailand

Coordinates: 9.0557°N 99.2558°E

Khao Hua Khwai เขาหัวควาย

General information
- Location: Mu 2 (Ban Khao Hua Khwai), Khao Hua Khwai Subdistrict, Phunphin District, Surat Thani
- Owner: State Railway of Thailand
- Line: Southern Line
- Platforms: 1
- Tracks: 2

Other information
- Station code: ขค.

Services
Preceding station	State Railway of Thailand	Following station
Surat Thani towards Hua Lamphong or Krung Thep Aphiwat	Southern Line	Bo Krang Halt towards Su-ngai Kolok
Location

Khao Hua Khwai railway station is a railway station located in Khao Hua Khwai Subdistrict, Phunphin District, Surat Thani. It is a class 3 railway station located 641.518 km (398.6 mi) from Thon Buri railway station.

== Train services ==
- Local No. 445/446 Chumphon-Hat Yai Junction-Chumphon
- Local No. 447/448 Surat Thani-Sungai Kolok-Surat Thani
