= Nong Jik railway halt =

Railway stop in Nang Long, Thailand

Nong Jik หนองจิก

General information
- Location: Mu 2 (Ban Nong Jik), Nang Long Subdistrict, Cha-uat District, Nakhon Si Thammarat
- Owner: State Railway of Thailand
- Line: Southern Line
- Platforms: 1
- Tracks: 1

Other information
- Station code: อจ.

Services
Preceding station	State Railway of Thailand	Following station
Cha-uat towards Hua Lamphong or Krung Thep Aphiwat	Southern Line	Ban Nang Long towards Su-ngai Kolok
Location

Nong Jik Railway Halt is a railway halt located in Nang Long Subdistrict, Cha-uat District, Nakhon Si Thammarat. It is located 810.694 km (503.7 mi) from Thon Buri Railway Station.

== Train services ==
- Local No. 445/446 Chumphon-Hat Yai Junction-Chumphon
- Local No. 447/448 Surat Thani-Sungai Kolok-Surat Thani
- Local No. 451/452 Nakhon Si Thammarat-Sungai Kolok-Nakhon Si Thammarat
- Local No. 455/456 Nakhon Si Thammarat-Yala-Nakhon Si Thammarat
- Local No. 457/458 Nakhon Si Thammarat-Phatthalung-Nakhon Si Thammarat
