= Khlong Prap railway halt =

Railway station in Thailand

Coordinates: 8.7459°N 99.3577°E

Khlong Prap คลองปราบ

General information
- Location: Surat Thani Local Road No.2071, Khlong Prap Subdistrict, Ban Na San District, Surat Thani
- Owner: State Railway of Thailand
- Line: Southern Line
- Platforms: 1
- Tracks: 1

Other information
- Station code: ปบ.

Services
Preceding station	State Railway of Thailand	Following station
Na San towards Hua Lamphong or Krung Thep Aphiwat	Southern Line	Phruphi towards Su-ngai Kolok
Location

Khlong Prap Railway Halt is a railway halt located in Khlong Prap Subdistrict, Ban Na San District, Surat Thani. It is located 679.9 km (422.5 mi) from Thon Buri Railway Station.

== Train services ==
- Local No. 445/446 Chumphon-Hat Yai Junction-Chumphon
- Local No. 447/448 Surat Thani-Sungai Kolok-Surat Thani
