= Thepha railway station =

Railway station in Thepha, Thailand

Thepha เทพา
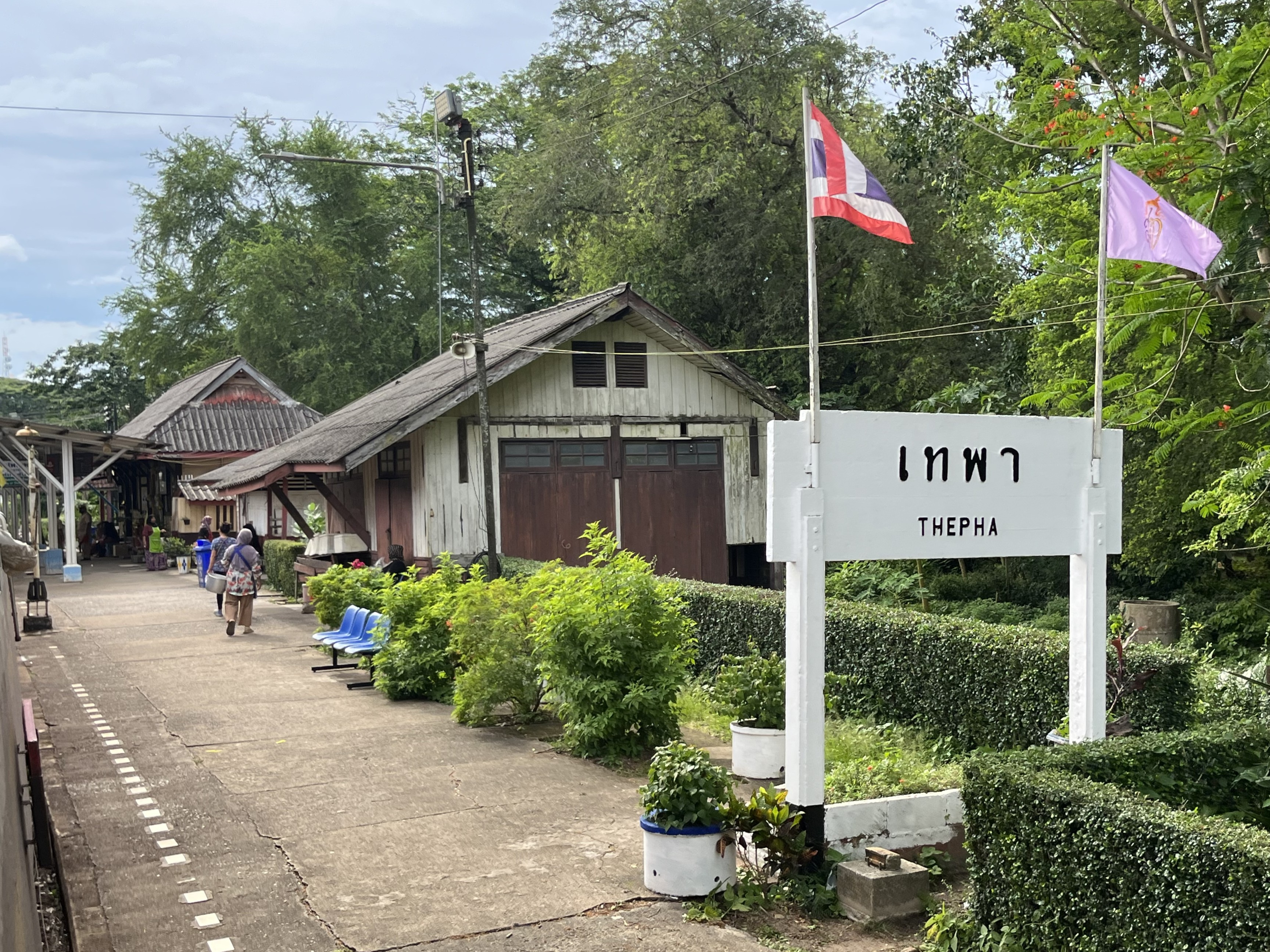

General information
- Location: Thepha Subdistrict, Thepha District, Songkhla
- Coordinates: 6.8239°N 100.9704°E
- Owner: State Railway of Thailand
- Line: Southern Line
- Platforms: 1
- Tracks: 3

Other information
- Station code: เท.

History
- Former names: Tha Muang

Services
Preceding station	State Railway of Thailand	Following station
Ko Saba towards Hua Lamphong or Krung Thep Aphiwat	Southern Line	Ta Paet towards Su-ngai Kolok
Location

Thepha railway station is a railway station located in Thepha Subdistrict, Thepha District, Songkhla, Thailand. It is a class 1 railway station located 992 km (616.4 mi) from Thon Buri railway station.

== Services ==
- Rapid No. 169/170 Bangkok-Yala-Bangkok
- Rapid No. 171/172 Bangkok-Sungai Kolok-Bangkok
- Rapid No. 175/176 Hat Yai Junction-Sungai Kolok-Hat Yai Junction
- Local No. 447/448 Surat Thani-Sungai Kolok-Surat Thani
- Local No. 451/452 Nakhon Si Thammarat-Sungai Kolok-Nakhon Si Thammarat
- Local No. 455/456 Nakhon Si Thammarat-Yala-Nakhon Si Thammarat
- Local No. 463/464 Phatthalung-Sungai Kolok-Phatthalung
