= Luk Kae railway station =

Railway station in Thailand

Luk Kae ลูกแก
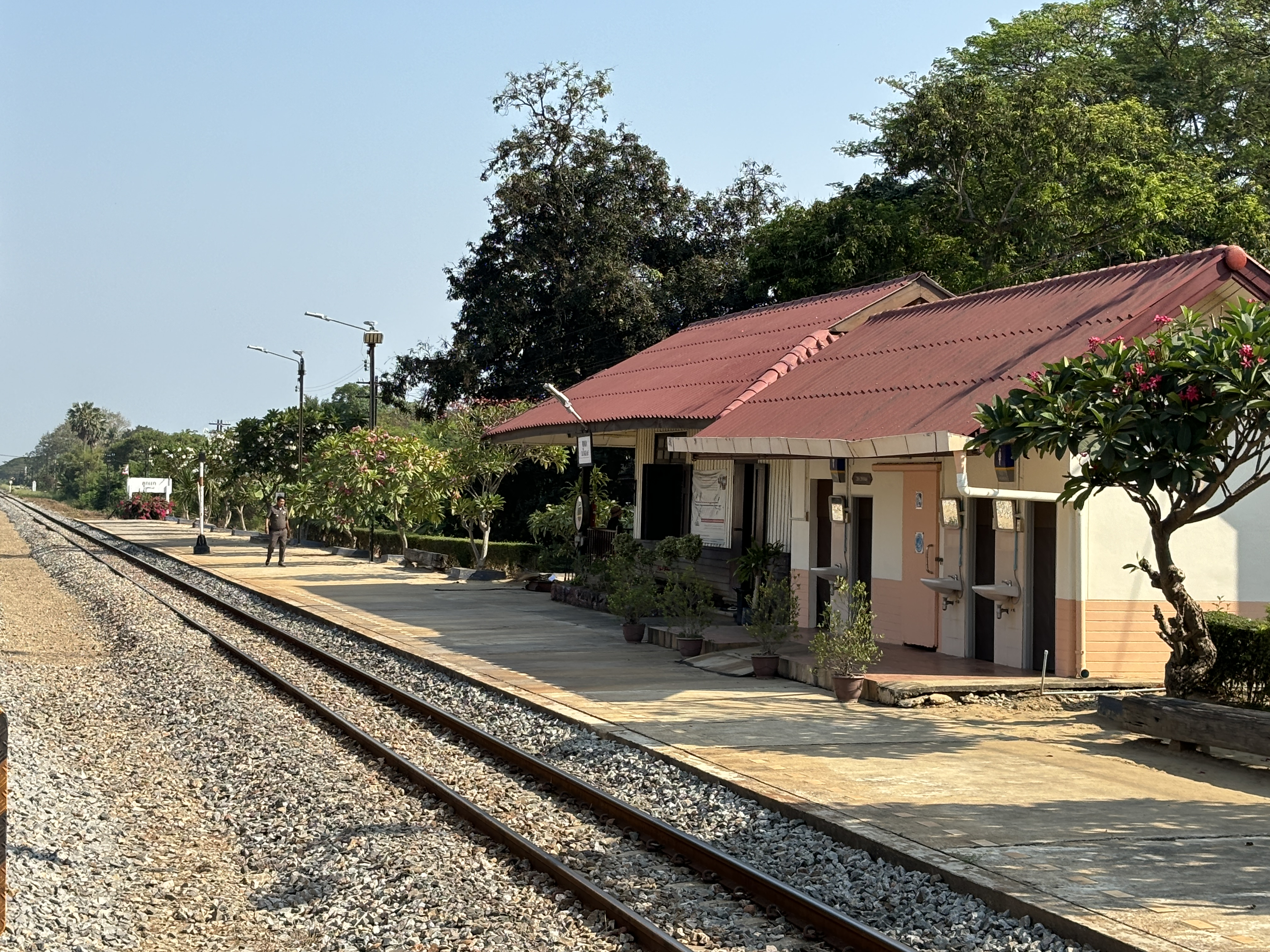

General information
- Location: Don Khamin Subdistrict, Tha Maka District; Kanchanaburi Province; Thailand
- Coordinates: 13.8705°N 99.8220°E
- Operator: State Railway of Thailand
- Manager: Ministry of Transport
- Line: Nam Tok Line (Death Railway)
- Distance: 77.43 km (48.1 mi) from Bangkok
- Platforms: 1
- Tracks: 2

Construction
- Structure type: At-grade

Other information
- Station code: ลแ.
- Classification: Class 2

Services
Preceding station	State Railway of Thailand	Following station
Sa Kosi Narai towards Nong Pladuk Junction	Southern Line Burma Railway	Tha Ruea Noi towards Nam Tok Sai Yok Noi Halt
Location

Luk Kae railway station is a railway station located in Don Khamin Subdistrict, Tha Maka District, Kanchanaburi Province. It is a class 2 railway station located 77.43 km (48.1 mi) from Thon Buri railway station.
