= Pak Tako railway station =

Railway station in Thailand

Coordinates: 10.0919°N 99.1023°E

Pak Tako ปากตะโก
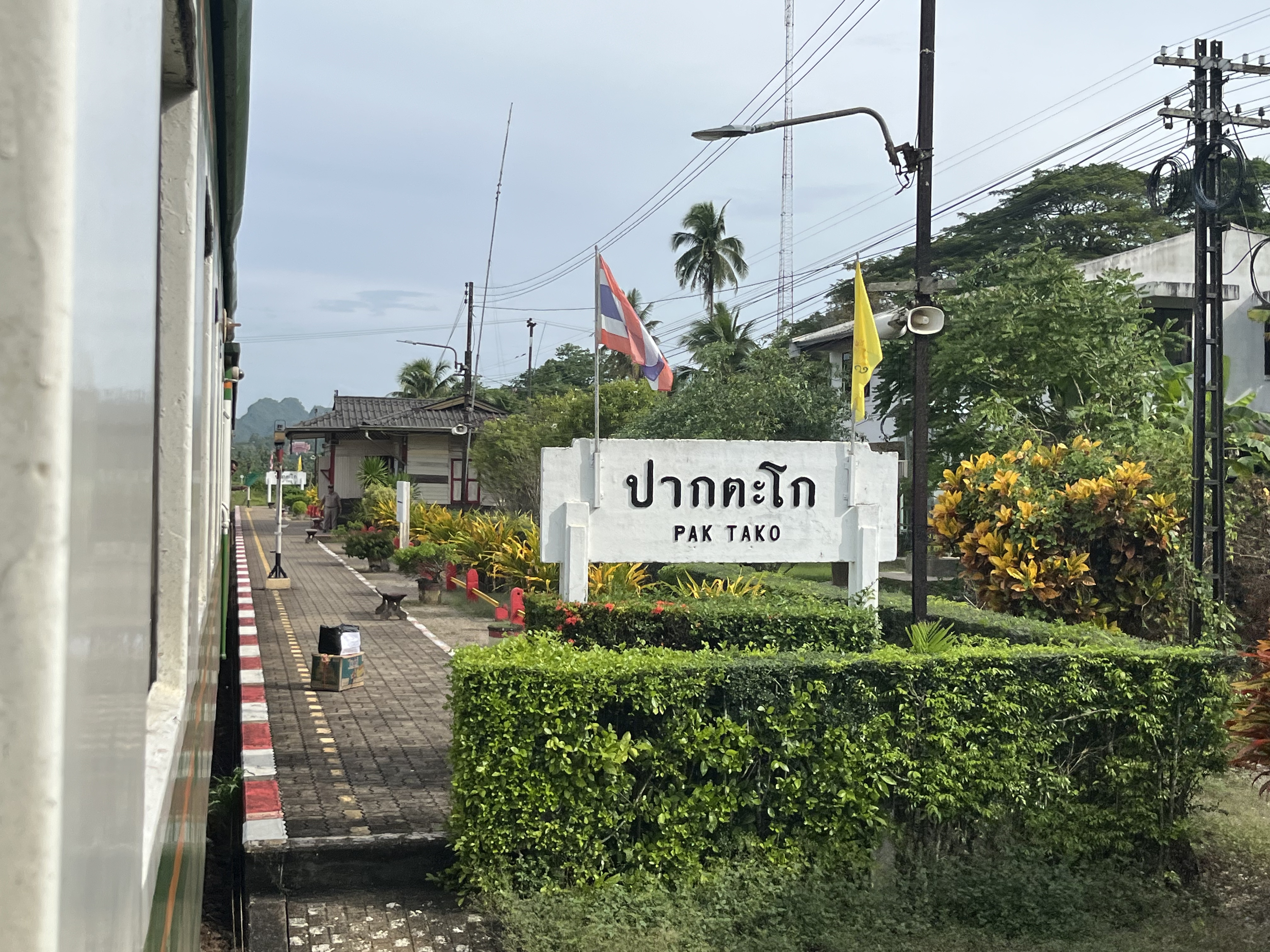

General information
- Location: Ban Pak Nam Tako, Thung Takhrai Subdistrict, Thung Tako District, Chumphon
- Owner: State Railway of Thailand
- Line: Southern Line
- Platforms: 1
- Tracks: 2

Other information
- Station code: ตก.

Services
Preceding station	State Railway of Thailand	Following station
Khao Pip Halt towards Hua Lamphong or Krung Thep Aphiwat	Southern Line	Tha Thong Halt towards Su-ngai Kolok
Location

Pak Tako railway station is a railway station located in Thung Takhrai Subdistrict, Thung Tako District, Chumphon. It is a class 3 railway station located 516.811 km (321.1 mi) from Thon Buri railway station.

== Train services ==
- Rapid No. 167/168 Krung Thep Aphiwat-Kantang-Krung Thep Aphiwat
- Ordinary No. 254/255 Lang Suan-Thon Buri-Lang Suan
- Local No. 445/446 Chumphon-Hat Yai Junction-Chumphon

== Gallery ==
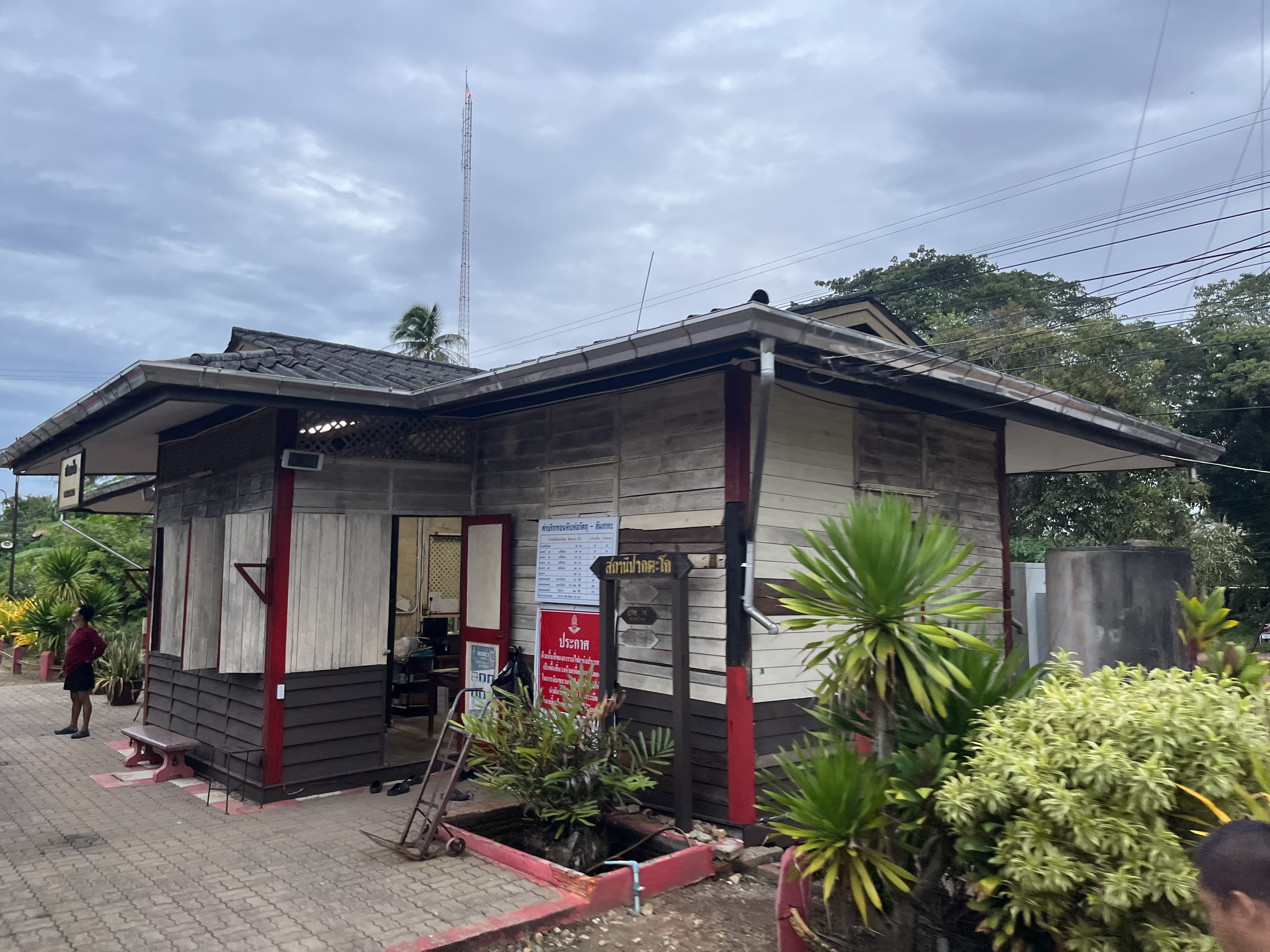
Station building
