= Huai Prik railway station =

Railway station in Thailand

Coordinates: 8.5686°N 99.4568°E

Huai Prik ห้วยปริก

General information
- Location: National Highway No. 4224, Huai Prik Subdistrict, Chawang District, Nakhon Si Thammarat
- Owner: State Railway of Thailand
- Line: Southern Line
- Platforms: 1
- Tracks: 3

Other information
- Station code: หป.4258

Services
Preceding station	State Railway of Thailand	Following station
Ban Phru Krachaeng towards Hua Lamphong or Krung Thep Aphiwat	Southern Line	Krabiat towards Su-ngai Kolok
Location

Huai Prik railway station is a railway station located in Huai Prik Subdistrict, Chawang District, Nakhon Si Thammarat. It is a class 3 railway station located 704.613 km (437.8 mi) from Thon Buri railway station.

== Train services ==
- Rapid No. 167/168 Bangkok-Kantang-Bangkok
- Local No. 445/446 Chumphon-Hat Yai Junction-Chumphon
- Local No. 447/448 Surat Thani-Sungai Kolok-Surat Thani
