= Than Pho railway station =

Railway station in Thailand

Than Pho ทานพอ

General information
- Location: Mu 3 (Ban Than Pho), Mai Riang Subdistrict, Chawang District, Nakhon Si Thammarat
- Coordinates: 8.4670°N 99.4921°E
- Owner: State Railway of Thailand
- Line: Southern Line
- Platforms: 1
- Tracks: 3

Other information
- Station code: ทา.

History
- Rebuilt: 1981

Services
Preceding station	State Railway of Thailand	Following station
Krabiat towards Hua Lamphong or Krung Thep Aphiwat	Southern Line	Chawang towards Su-ngai Kolok
Location

Than Pho railway station is a railway station located in Mai Riang Subdistrict, Chawang District, Nakhon Si Thammarat. It is a class 3 railway station located 716.665 km (445.3 mi) from Thon Buri railway station. The original railway station was destroyed by arsonists in 1981, and has now been rebuilt to a concrete building.

== Train services ==
- Rapid No. 167/168 Bangkok-Kantang-Bangkok
- Rapid No. 169/170 Bangkok-Yala-Bangkok
- Rapid No. 173/174 Bangkok-Nakhon Si Thammarat-Bangkok
- Local No. 445/446 Chumphon-Hat Yai Junction-Chumphon
- Local No. 447/448 Surat Thani-Sungai Kolok-Surat Thani
