= Khok Khram railway station =

Railway station in Sao Thong, Thailand

Khok Khram โคกคราม

General information
- Location: Mu 5 (Ban Khok Khram), Sao Thong Subdistrict, Ron Phibun District; Nakhon Si Thammarat Province; Thailand
- Coordinates: 8.1479°N 99.8822°E
- Operator: State Railway of Thailand
- Line: Nakhon Si Thammarat Branch
- Platforms: 1
- Tracks: 2

Construction
- Structure type: At-grade

Other information
- Station code: คค.
- Classification: Class 3

History
- Former names: Khok Khram

Services
Preceding station	State Railway of Thailand	Following station
Ban Thung Lo towards Khao Chum Thong Junction	Southern Line Nakhon Si Thammarat Branch	Ban Huai Yoong Halt towards Nakhon Si Thammarat
Location

Khok Khram railway station is a railway station located in Sao Thong Subdistrict, Ron Phibun District, Nakhon Si Thammarat. The station is a class 3 railway station, located 794.678 km (493.8 mi) from Thon Buri railway station.

== Train services ==
- Rapid train No. 173 / 174 Bangkok–Nakhon Si Thammarat–Bangkok
- Local train No. 451/452 Nakhon Si Thammarat–Sungai Kolok–Nakhon Si Thammarat
- Local train No. 455/456 Nakhon Si Thammarat–Yala–Nakhon Si Thammarat
- Local train No. 457/458 Nakhon Si Thammarat–Phatthalung–Nakhon Si Thammarat
