= Ban Khai Thai railway halt =

Railway station in Khuan Maphrao, Thailand

Ban Khai Thai บ้านค่ายไทย

General information
- Location: Mu 16 (Ban Khai Thai), Khuan Maphrao Subdistrict, Phatthalung City
- Coordinates: 7.554794°N 100.103421°E
- Owner: State Railway of Thailand
- Line: Southern Line
- Platforms: 1
- Tracks: 1

Other information
- Station code: ทย.

Services
Preceding station	State Railway of Thailand	Following station
Na Prue Halt towards Hua Lamphong or Krung Thep Aphiwat	Southern Line	Ban Ton Don towards Su-ngai Kolok
Location

Ban Khai Thai Halt (Thai: ที่หยุดรถบ้านค่ายไทย) is a railway halt located in Khuan Maphrao Subdistrict, Phatthalung City, Phatthalung. It is located 853.194 km (530.2 mi) from Thon Buri Railway Station.

== Train services ==
- Local No. 445/446 Chumphon-Hat Yai Junction-Chumphon
- Local No. 447/448 Surat Thani-Sungai Kolok-Surat Thani
- Local No. 463/464 Phatthalung-Sungai Kolok-Phatthalung
