= Na Bon railway station =

Railway station in Thailand

Coordinates: 8.2660°N 99.5960°E

Na Bon นาบอน

General information
- Location: Thesaban 7 Road, Na Bon Subdistrict, Na Bon District, Nakhon Si Thammarat
- Owner: State Railway of Thailand
- Line: Southern Line
- Platforms: 1
- Tracks: 2

Other information
- Station code: าอ.

Services
Preceding station	State Railway of Thailand	Following station
Khlong Kui Halt towards Hua Lamphong or Krung Thep Aphiwat	Southern Line	Khlong Chang towards Su-ngai Kolok
Location

Na Bon railway station is a railway station located in Na Bon Subdistrict, Na Bon District, Nakhon Si Thammarat. It is a class 2 railway station located 743.016 km (461.7 mi) from Thon Buri railway station.

== Train services ==
- Express No. 85/86 Bangkok-Nakhon Si Thammarat-Bangkok
- Rapid No. 167/168 Bangkok-Kantang-Bangkok
- Rapid No. 169/170 Bangkok-Yala-Bangkok
- Rapid No. 173/174 Bangkok-Nakhon Si Thammarat-Bangkok
- Local No. 445/446 Chumphon-Hat Yai Junction-Chumphon
- Local No. 447/448 Surat Thani-Sungai Kolok-Surat Thani
