= Na San railway station =

Railway station in Thailand

Coordinates: 8.8013°N 99.3624°E

Na San นาสาร

General information
- Location: Phunsiri Road, Na San Subdistrict, Ban Na San District, Surat Thani
- Owner: State Railway of Thailand
- Line: Southern Line
- Platforms: 1
- Tracks: 3

Other information
- Station code: นส.

Services
| Preceding station | State Railway of Thailand | Following station |
|---|---|---|
| Huai Mut towards Hua Lamphong or Krung Thep Aphiwat | Southern Line | Khlong Prap Halt towards Su-ngai Kolok |
Location

Na San railway station is a railway station located in Ban Na San Subdistrict, Ban Na San District, Surat Thani. It is a class 1 railway station located 673.75 km (418.6 mi) from Thon Buri railway station.

== Train services ==
- Special Express No. 41/42 Bangkok-Yala-Bangkok
- Express No. 83/84 Bangkok-Trang-Bangkok
- Express No. 85/86 Bangkok-Nakhon Si Thammarat-Bangkok
- Rapid No. 167/168 Bangkok-Kantang-Bangkok
- Rapid No. 171/172 Bangkok-Sungai Kolok-Bangkok
- Rapid No. 173/174 Bangkok-Nakhon Si Thammarat-Bangkok
- Local No. 445/446 Chumphon-Hat Yai Junction-Chumphon
- Local No. 447/448 Surat Thani-Sungai Kolok-Surat Thani
