= Khao Phlu railway station =

Railway station in Thailand

Coordinates: 8.9734°N 99.2940°E

Khao Phlu เขาพลู

General information
- Location: Mu 5 (Ban Khao Phlu), Tha Sathon Subdistrict, Phunphin District, Surat Thani
- Owner: State Railway of Thailand
- Line: Southern Line
- Platforms: 1
- Tracks: 2

Other information
- Station code: ขพ.

Services
| Preceding station | State Railway of Thailand | Following station |
|---|---|---|
| Bo Krang Halt towards Hua Lamphong or Krung Thep Aphiwat | Southern Line | Khlong Ya Halt towards Su-ngai Kolok |
Location

Khao Phlu railway station is a railway station located in Tha Sathon Subdistrict, Phunphin District, Surat Thani. It is a class 3 railway station located 652.467 km (405.4 mi) from Thon Buri railway station.

== Train services ==
- Local No. 445/446 Chumphon-Hat Yai Junction-Chumphon
- Local No. 447/448 Surat Thani-Sungai Kolok-Surat Thani
