= Surat Thani railway station =

Railway station in Thailand

Coordinates: 9°6′14″N 99°13′50″E

Surat Thani สุราษฎร์ธานี
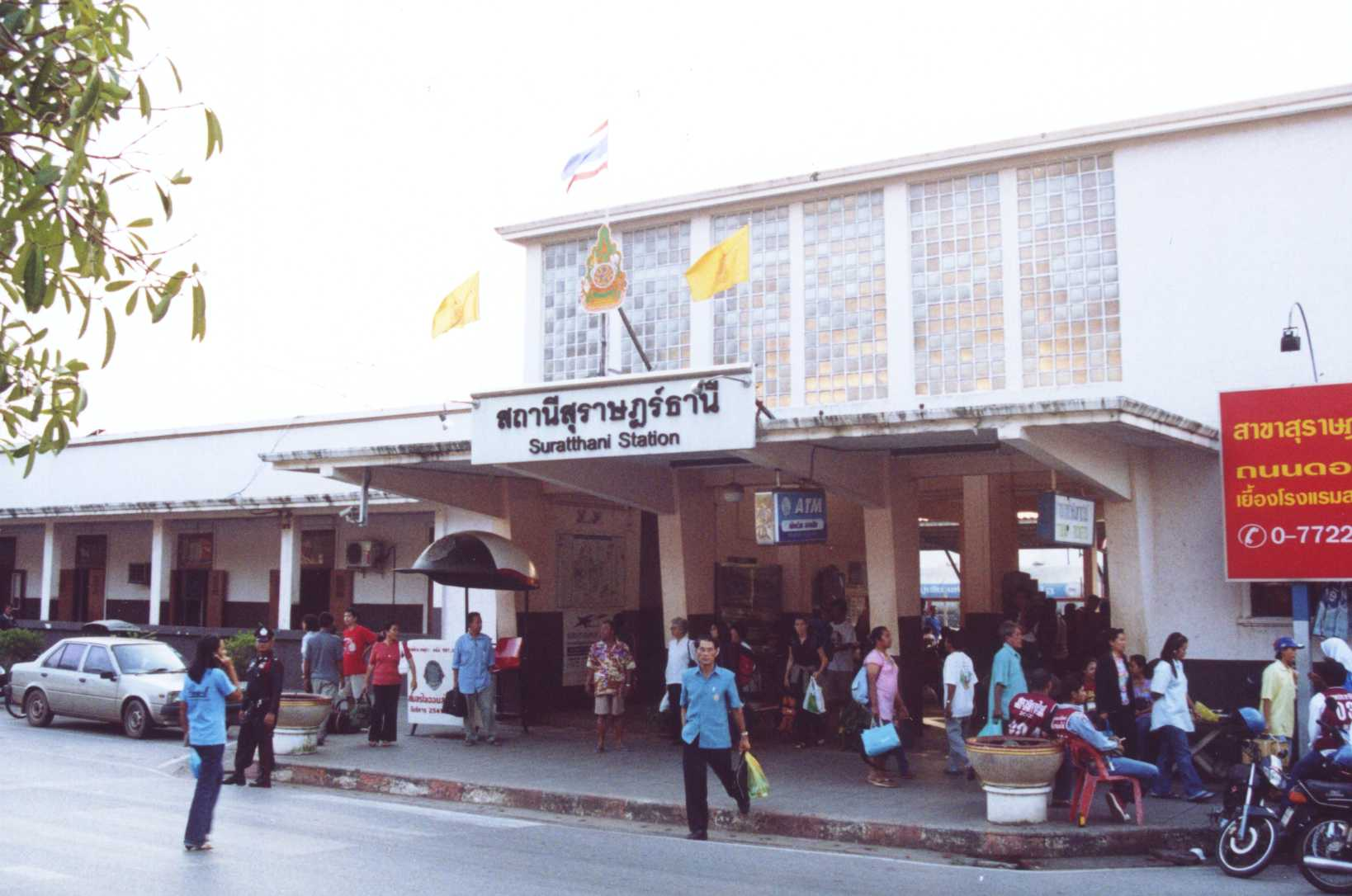
- Train station building

General information
- Location: National Highway No.4008, Tha Kham Subdistrict, Phunphin District, Surat Thani
- Owner: State Railway of Thailand
- Line: Southern Line

Other information
- Station code: รท.

History
- Opened: 1915
- Rebuilt: 1954

Services
Preceding station	State Railway of Thailand	Following station
Ban Thung Pho Junction towards Hua Lamphong or Krung Thep Aphiwat	Southern Line	Khao Hua Khwai towards Su-ngai Kolok
Location

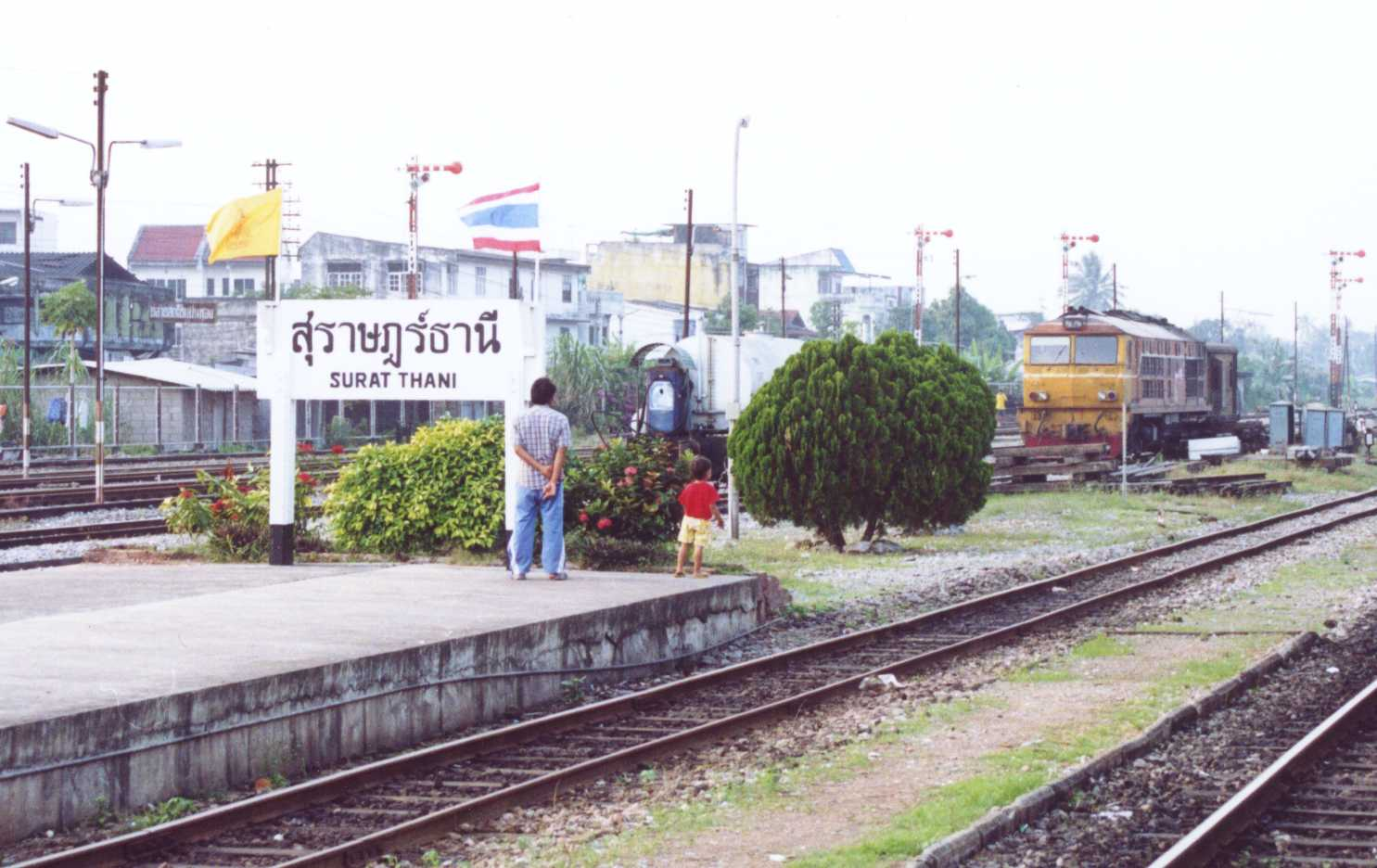
Train platform with signboard

Surat Thani railway station (SRT Code: SRN) is the main railway station in Surat Thani Province, Thailand. It is on the State Railway of Thailand's Southern Line, located 635.106 km from Thon Buri railway station. The station is on the eastern bank of the Tapi River in Tha Kham town, Phun Phin District. Surat Thani Station first opened in 1915, and was originally named Phun Phin Station. The name was later changed to "Surat Thani railway station".

It is also the station to alight for passengers traveling to Ko Samui.

== History ==
In World War II, the Imperial Japanese Army used the station as a base for military activity. The station and the Chulachomklao Bridge (then named Tha Kham) across the Tapi were both bombed in May 1945 by American aircraft. The SRT, then known as the Royal State Railways of Siam, built a temporary station called Surat Thani 2 to replace the old station while it was being rebuilt.

Surat Thani 2 railway station was demolished after the Chulachomklao Bridge was reopened for traffic in a ceremony on 16 February 1953, and the new Surat Thani Station building was finished in 1954.

== Train services ==
Currently, Surat Thani railway station serves 28 trains per day, all of them served by SRT.

1. International Express train No. 45 / 46 Krung Thep Aphiwat - Padang Besar - Krung Thep Aphiwat
2. Thaksinarath Express train No.31 / 32 Krung Thep Aphiwat - Hat Yai Junction - Krung Thep Aphiwat
3. Thaksin Express train No. 37 / 38 Krung Thep Aphiwat - Sungai Kolok - Krung Thep Aphiwat
4. DMU Special Express train No. 39 / 40 Krung Thep Aphiwat - Surat Thani - Krung Thep Aphiwat
5. DMU Special Express train No. 41 / 42 Krung Thep Aphiwat - Yala - Krung Thep Aphiwat
6. DMU Special Express train No. 43 / 44 Krung Thep Aphiwat - Surat Thani - Krung Thep Aphiwat
7. Express train No. 83 / 84 Krung Thep Aphiwat - Trang - Krung Thep Aphiwat
8. Express train No. 85 / 86 Krung Thep Aphiwat - Nakhon Si Thammarat - Krung Thep Aphiwat
9. Rapid train No. 167 / 168 Krung Thep Aphiwat - Kantang - Krung Thep Aphiwat
10. Rapid train No. 169 / 170 Krung Thep Aphiwat - Yala - Krung Thep Aphiwat
11. Rapid train No. 171 / 172 Krung Thep Aphiwat - Sungai Kolok - Krung Thep Aphiwat
12. Rapid train No. 173 / 174 Krung Thep Aphiwat - Nakhon Si Thammarat - Krung Thep Aphiwat
13. Local train No. 445 / 446 Chumphon - Hat Yai - Chumphon
14. Local train No. 447 / 448 Surat Thani - Sungai Kolok - Surat Thani
15. Local train No. 489 / 490 Surat Thani - Khiri Rat Nikhom - Surat Thani

=== Seasonal ===
- Eastern & Oriental Express train No. 500 / 501 Bangkok - Singapore - Bangkok

=== Former services ===
- International Express train No. 35/36 Bangkok - Butterworth - Bangkok (ceased 2016)

== Transportation ==
The red bus connects the railway station with downtown Surat Thani City, leaving every 15 minutes. Minibuses to other districts such as Chaiya, Wiang Sa, and Ban Na, are also available.

== Notes ==
- Rapid train No. 167 Bangkok - Kantang arrives here at about 7.47 a.m. daily and stops for about 15 minutes to remove some of the carriages.
- Rapid train No. 174 Nakhon Si Thammarat - Bangkok arrives here at about 4.47 p.m. daily. After all passengers have boarded, the locomotive will be removed to bring 3 carriages to connect to the train before departing.
