= Tha Ruea Noi railway station =

Railway station in Thailand

Tha Ruea Noi ท่าเรือน้อย
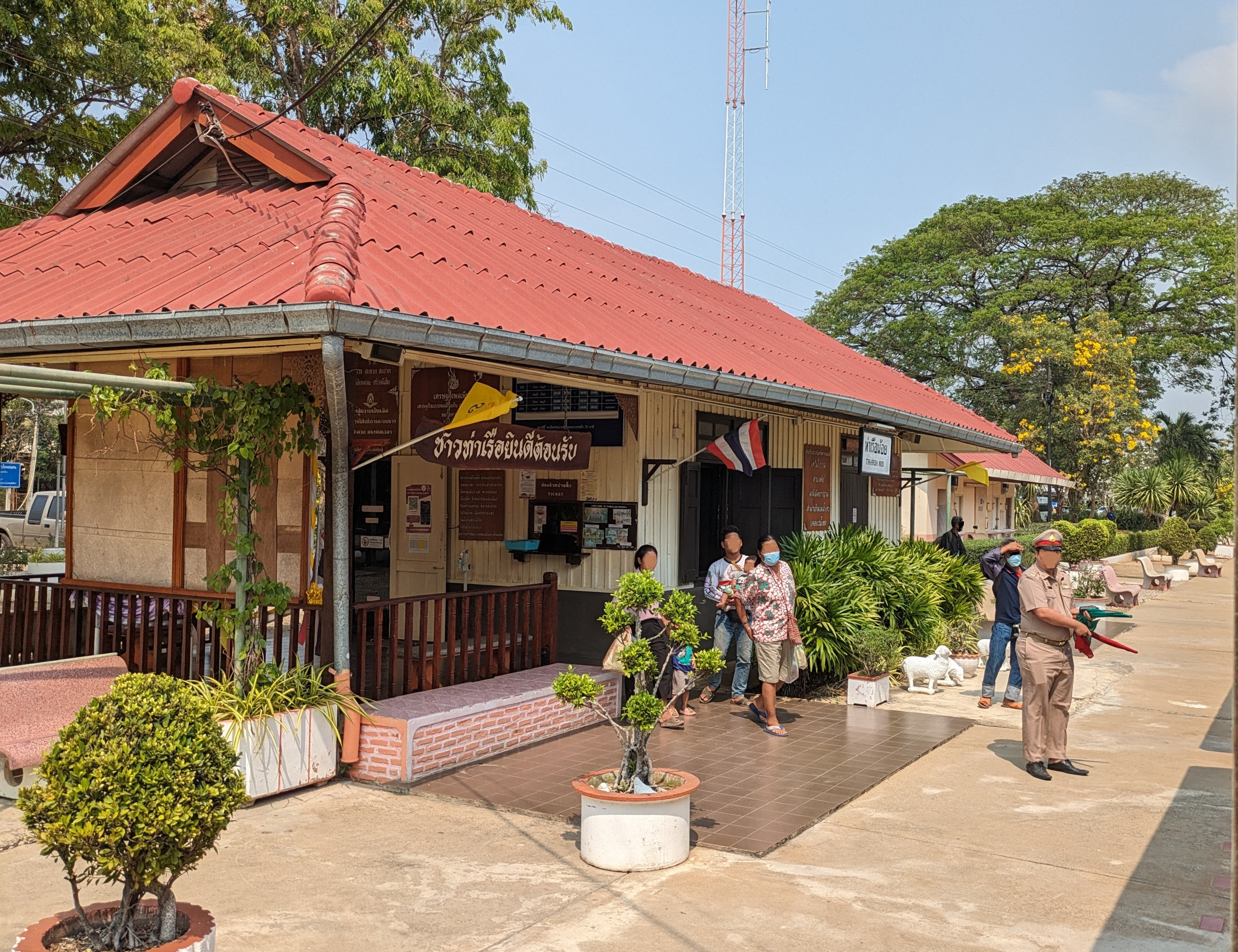

General information
- Location: Tha Ruea Subdistrict, Tha Maka District; Kanchanaburi Province; Thailand
- Coordinates: 13.9562°N 99.7516°E
- Operator: State Railway of Thailand
- Manager: Ministry of Transport
- Line: Nam Tok Line (Death Railway)
- Platforms: 1
- Tracks: 2

Construction
- Structure type: At-grade

Other information
- Station code: ทน.
- Classification: Class 2

Services
Preceding station	State Railway of Thailand	Following station
Luk Kae towards Nong Pladuk Junction	Southern Line Burma Railway	Nong Suea Halt towards Nam Tok Sai Yok Noi Halt
Location

Tha Ruea Noi railway station is a railway station located in Tha Ruea Subdistrict, Tha Maka District, Kanchanaburi Province. It is a class 2 railway station located 89.77 km (55.8 mi) from Thon Buri railway station.
