= Ta Paet railway station =

Railway station in Pak Bang, Thailand

Ta Paet ตาแปด
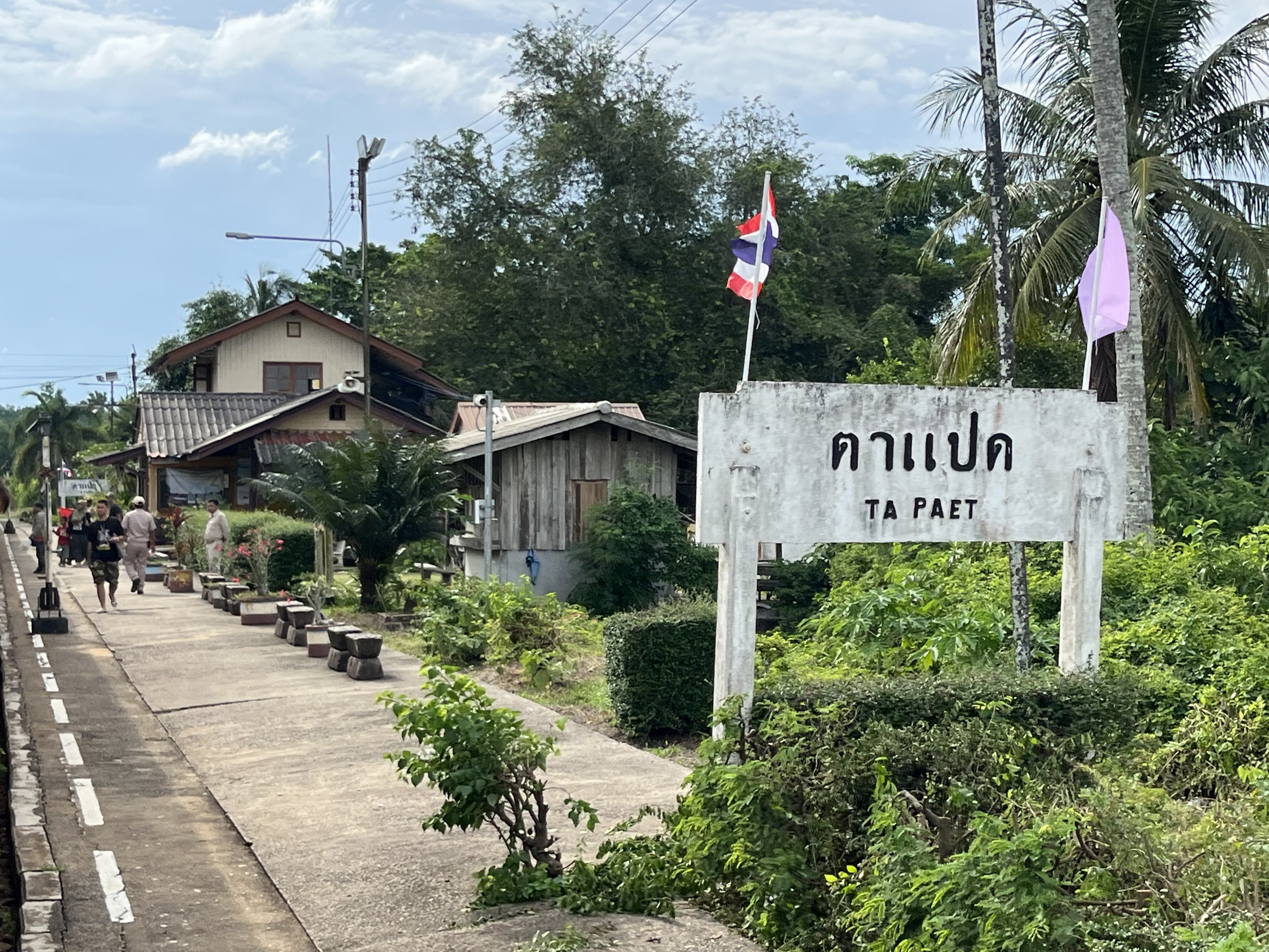

General information
- Location: Mu 5 (Ban Ta Paet), Pak Bang Subdistrict, Thepha District, Songkhla
- Coordinates: 6.7799°N 101.0270°E
- Owner: State Railway of Thailand
- Line: Southern Line
- Platforms: 1
- Tracks: 2

Other information
- Station code: ตป.

Services
Preceding station	State Railway of Thailand	Following station
Thepha towards Hua Lamphong or Krung Thep Aphiwat	Southern Line	Ban Nikhom Halt towards Su-ngai Kolok
Location

Ta Paet railway station is a railway station located in Pak Bang Subdistrict, Thepha District, Songkhla. It is a class 3 railway station located 999.913 km (621.3 mi) from Thon Buri railway station.

On 19 May 2015, a bomb planted by separatists exploded near Ta Paet railway station, injuring two military volunteers, who were sent to Thepha Hospital afterwards. The event was part of the South Thailand Insurgency.

== Services ==
- Local No. 447/448 Surat Thani-Sungai Kolok-Surat Thani
- Local No. 451/452 Nakhon Si Thammarat-Sungai Kolok-Nakhon Si Thammarat
- Local No. 455/456 Nakhon Si Thammarat-Yala-Nakhon Si Thammarat
- Local No. 463/464 Phatthalung-Sungai Kolok-Phatthalung
