= Phruphi railway station =

Railway station in Thailand

Coordinates: 8.7086°N 99.3535°E

Phruphi พรุพี

General information
- Location: Surat Thani Local Road No. 4125, Mu 4, Phruphi Subdistrict, Ban Na San District, Surat Thani
- Owner: State Railway of Thailand
- Line: Southern Line
- Platforms: 1
- Tracks: 3

Other information
- Station code: พพ.

Services
Preceding station	State Railway of Thailand	Following station
Khlong Prap Halt towards Hua Lamphong or Krung Thep Aphiwat	Southern Line	Khlong Sun Halt towards Su-ngai Kolok
Location

Phruphi railway station is a railway station located in Phruphi Subdistrict, Ban Na San District, Surat Thani. It is a class 3 railway station located 684.036 km (425.0 mi) from Thon Buri railway station.

== Train services ==
- Rapid No. 173/174 Bangkok-Nakhon Si Thammarat-Bangkok
- Local No. 445/446 Chumphon-Hat Yai Junction-Chumphon
- Local No. 447/448 Surat Thani-Sungai Kolok-Surat Thani
