= Ban Na railway station =

Railway station in Thailand

Coordinates: 8.8866°N 99.3107°E

Ban Na บ้านนา

General information
- Location: Na Amphoe Road, Ban Na Subdistrict, Ban Na Doem District, Surat Thani
- Owner: State Railway of Thailand
- Line: Southern Line
- Platforms: 1
- Tracks: 3

Other information
- Station code: นน.

Services
Preceding station	State Railway of Thailand	Following station
Khlong Ya Halt towards Hua Lamphong or Krung Thep Aphiwat	Southern Line	Huai Mut towards Su-ngai Kolok
Location

Ban Na station (Thai: สถานีบ้านนา) is a railway station located in Ban Na Subdistrict, Ban Na Doem District, Surat Thani. It is a class 2 railway station located 662.347 km (411.6 mi) from Thon Buri railway station.

== Train services ==
- Rapid No. 173/174 Bangkok-Nakhon Si Thammarat-Bangkok
- Local No. 445/446 Chumphon-Hat Yai Junction-Chumphon
- Local No. 447/448 Surat Thani-Sungai Kolok-Surat Thani
