= Lak Chang railway station =

Railway station in Thailand

Coordinates: 8.3219°N 99.5476°E

Lak Chang หลักช้าง

General information
- Location: National Highway No. 4019, Lak Chang Subdistrict, Chang Klang District, Nakhon Si Thammarat
- Owner: State Railway of Thailand
- Line: Southern Line
- Platforms: 1
- Tracks: 2

Other information
- Station code: หช.

Services
Preceding station	State Railway of Thailand	Following station
Pho Than Klai Wachasit Halt towards Hua Lamphong or Krung Thep Aphiwat	Southern Line	Khlong Kui Halt towards Su-ngai Kolok
Location

Lak Chang railway station is a railway station located in Lak Chang Subdistrict, Chang Klang District, Nakhon Si Thammarat. It is a class 3 railway station located 734.717 km (456.5 mi) from Thon Buri railway station.

== Train services ==
- Local No. 445/446 Chumphon-Hat Yai Junction-Chumphon
- Local No. 447/448 Surat Thani-Sungai Kolok-Surat Thani
