= Ban Phru Krachaeng railway station =

Railway station in Thailand

Coordinates: 8.5934°N 99.4213°E

Ban Phru Krachaeng บ้านพรุกระแชง

General information
- Location: Saithangkhao Talat Phrukrachaeng Mu 11, 16, 12 Road, Ban Song Subdistrict, Wiang Sa District, Surat Thani
- Owner: State Railway of Thailand
- Line: Southern Line
- Platforms: 1
- Tracks: 2

Other information
- Station code: แช.

Services
Preceding station	State Railway of Thailand	Following station
Ban Song towards Hua Lamphong or Krung Thep Aphiwat	Southern Line	Huai Prik towards Su-ngai Kolok
Location

Ban Pru Krachaeng station (Thai: สถานีบ้านพรุกระแซง) is a railway station located in Ban Song Subdistrict, Wiang Sa District, Surat Thani. It is a class 3 railway station located 699.78 km (434.8 mi) from Thon Buri railway station.

== Train services ==
- Local No. 445/446 Chumphon-Hat Yai Junction-Chumphon
- Local No. 447/448 Surat Thani-Sungai Kolok-Surat Thani
