= Krabiat railway station =

Railway station in Thailand

Coordinates: 8.5251°N 99.4733°E

Krabiat กระเบียด

General information
- Location: Nakhon Si Thammarat Local Road No. 2023, Kapiat Subdistrict, Chawang District, Nakhon Si Thammarat
- Owner: State Railway of Thailand
- Line: Southern Line
- Platforms: 1
- Tracks: 2

Other information
- Station code: เบ.

History
- Former names: Kapiat

Services
Preceding station	State Railway of Thailand	Following station
Huai Prik towards Hua Lamphong or Krung Thep Aphiwat	Southern Line	Than Pho towards Su-ngai Kolok
Location

Krabiat railway station is a railway station located in Kapiat Subdistrict, Chawang District, Nakhon Si Thammarat. It is a class 3 railway station located 709.877 km (441.1 mi) from Thon Buri railway station.

== Train services ==
- Rapid No. 167/168 Bangkok-Kantang-Bangkok
- Local No. 445/446 Chumphon-Hat Yai Junction-Chumphon
- Local No. 447/448 Surat Thani-Sungai Kolok-Surat Thani
