= Ban Thung Lo railway station =

Railway station in Khuan Chum, Thailand

Ban Thung Lo บ้านทุ่งหล่อ

General information
- Location: Mu 2 (Ban Thung Lo), Khuan Chum Subdistrict, Ron Phibun District; Nakhon Si Thammarat Province; Thailand
- Coordinates: 8.1479°N 99.8822°E
- Operator: State Railway of Thailand
- Distance: 790.590 km (491.2 mi) from Thon Buri
- Platforms: 1
- Tracks: 2

Other information
- Station code: ลอ.
- Classification: Class 3

History
- Opened: 1914

Services
Preceding station	State Railway of Thailand	Following station
Ban Koei Chen Halt towards Khao Chum Thong Junction	Southern Line Nakhon Si Thammarat Branch	Khok Khram towards Nakhon Si Thammarat
Location

Ban Thung Lo station (Thai: สถานีบ้านทุ่งหล่อ) is a railway station located in Khuan Chum Subdistrict, Ron Phibun District, Nakhon Si Thammarat. The station is a class 3 railway station, located 790.590 km (491.2 mi) from Thon Buri railway station.

== Train services ==
- Rapid train No. 173 / 174 Bangkok–Nakhon Si Thammarat–Bangkok
- Local train No. 451/452 Nakhon Si Thammarat–Sungai Kolok–Nakhon Si Thammarat
- Local train No. 455/456 Nakhon Si Thammarat–Yala–Nakhon Si Thammarat
- Local train No. 457/458 Nakhon Si Thammarat–Phatthalung–Nakhon Si Thammarat
