= Bo Krang railway halt =

Railway station in Thailand

Coordinates: 9.0102°N 99.2695°E

Bo Krang บ่อกรัง

General information
- Location: Mu 2 (Ban Bo Krang), Tha Sathon Subdistrict, Phunphin District, Surat Thani
- Owner: State Railway of Thailand
- Line: Southern Line
- Platforms: 1
- Tracks: 1

Other information
- Station code: กง.

Services
Preceding station	State Railway of Thailand	Following station
Khao Hua Khwai towards Hua Lamphong or Krung Thep Aphiwat	Southern Line	Khao Phlu towards Su-ngai Kolok
Location

Bo Krang Railway Halt (Thai: ที่หยุดรถบ่อกรัง) is a railway station located in Tha Sathon Subdistrict, Phunphin District, Surat Thani. It is located 647.235 km (402.2 mi) from Thon Buri Railway Station.

== Train services ==
- Local No. 445/446 Chumphon-Hat Yai Junction-Chumphon
- Local No. 447/448 Surat Thani-Sungai Kolok-Surat Thani
