= Khao Pip railway halt =

Railway halt in Thailand

Khao Pip เขาปีบ
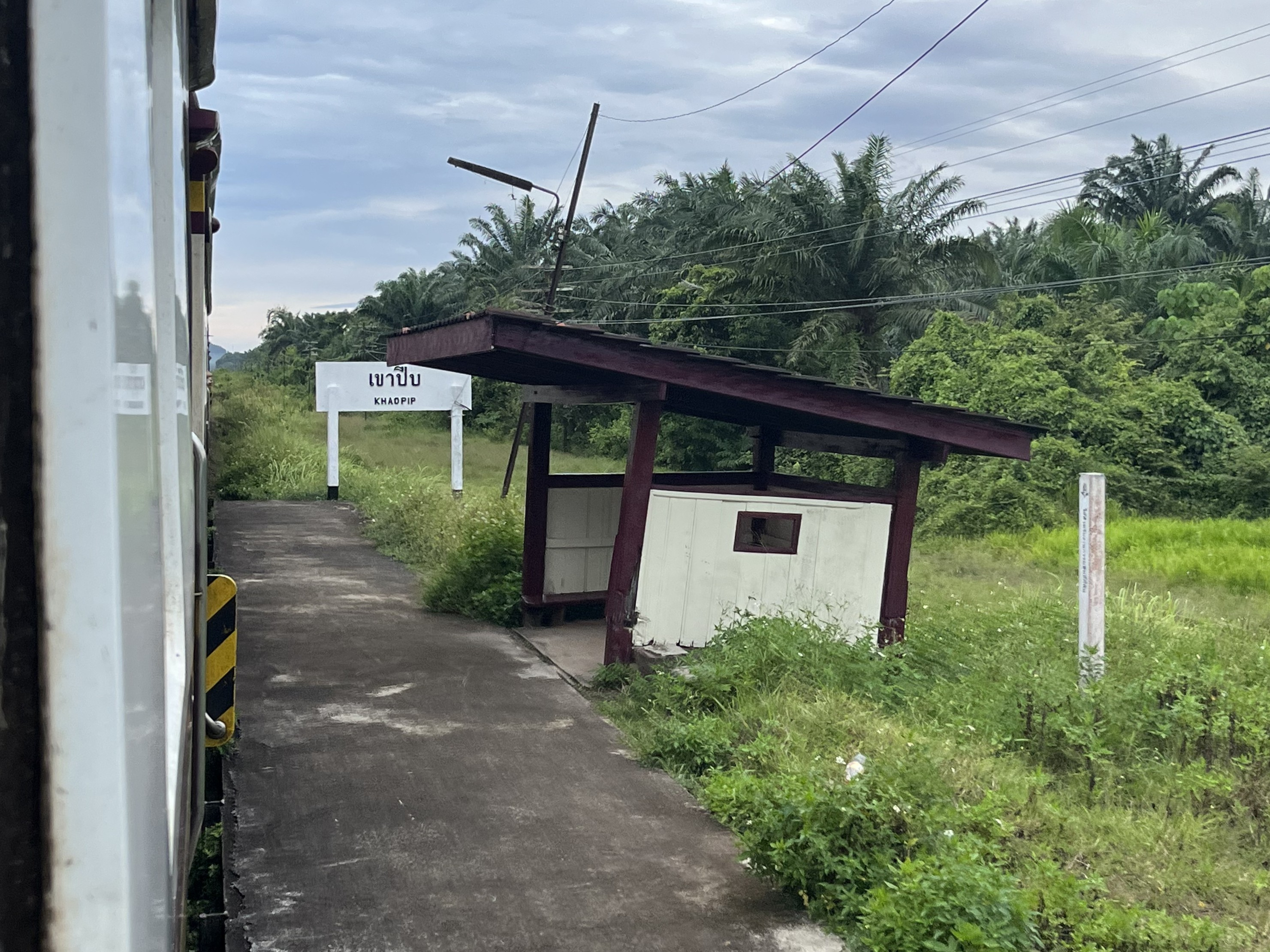

General information
- Location: Mu 6 (Ban Khao Pip), Thung Takhrai Subdistrict, Thung Tako District, Chumphon
- Owner: State Railway of Thailand
- Line: Southern Line
- Platforms: 1
- Tracks: 1

Other information
- Station code: ขป.

Services
| Preceding station | State Railway of Thailand | Following station |
|---|---|---|
| Khao Suan Thurian towards Hua Lamphong or Krung Thep Aphiwat | Southern Line | Pak Tako towards Su-ngai Kolok |
Location

Khao Pip Railway Halt is a railway halt located in Thung Takhrai Subdistrict, Thung Tako District, Chumphon. It is located 511.32 km (317.7 mi) from Thon Buri Railway Station

== Train services ==
- Ordinary No. 254/255 Lang Suan-Thon Buri-Lang Suan
- Local No. 445/446 Chumphon-Hat Yai Junction-Chumphon
