= To Deng railway station =

Railway station in Todeng, Thailand

To Deng โต๊ะเด็ง
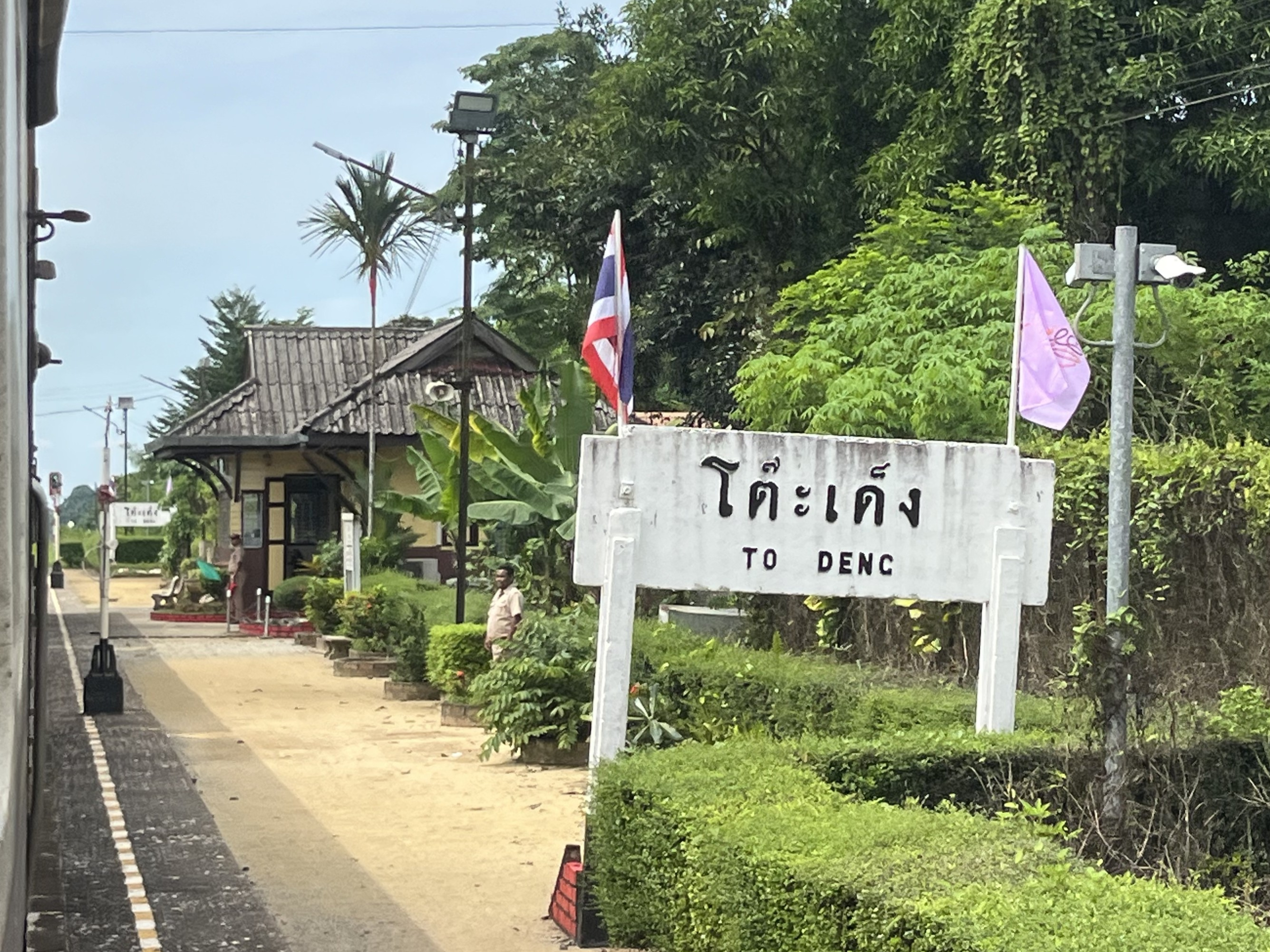

General information
- Location: Mu 1 (Ban To Deng), To Deng Subdistrict, Su-ngai Padi District, Narathiwat
- Coordinates: 6.1191°N 101.8583°E
- Owner: State Railway of Thailand
- Line: Southern Line
- Platforms: 1
- Tracks: 2

Other information
- Station code: ตด.

Services
Preceding station	State Railway of Thailand	Following station
Ai Satia Halt towards Hua Lamphong or Krung Thep Aphiwat	Southern Line	Su-ngai Padi towards Su-ngai Kolok
Location

To Deng railway station is a railway station located in To Deng Subdistrict, Su-ngai Padi District, Narathiwat. It is a class 3 railway station located 1,125.658 km (699.5 mi) from Thon Buri railway station.

== South Thailand insurgency events ==
On 3 November 2013, a separatist bomb exploded at To Deng railway station, killing one military volunteer. The 5 kg bomb was planted at the southern railway track gate in a metal box, about 200 metres from To Deng station building. A group of nine military volunteers went to open the railway track gate for the Local No. 448 Sungai Kolok-Surat Thani to enter the station. However, as they were opening the gates, separatists ignited the bomb, and a military volunteer (who died afterwards) took the full impact of the bomb. The other eight volunteers were therefore safe. As a result of the bombings, Local No. 448 was delayed for 2 hours.

== Services ==
- Local No. 447/448 Surat Thani-Sungai Kolok-Surat Thani
- Local No. 451/452 Nakhon Si Thammarat-Sungai Kolok-Nakhon Si Thammarat
- Local No. 453/454 Yala-Sungai Kolok-Yala
- Local No. 463/464 Phatthalung-Sungai Kolok-Phatthalung
