= Khao Suan Thurian railway station =

Railway station in Thailand

Coordinates: 10.1668°N 99.1059°E

Khao Suan Thurian เขาสวนทุเรียน
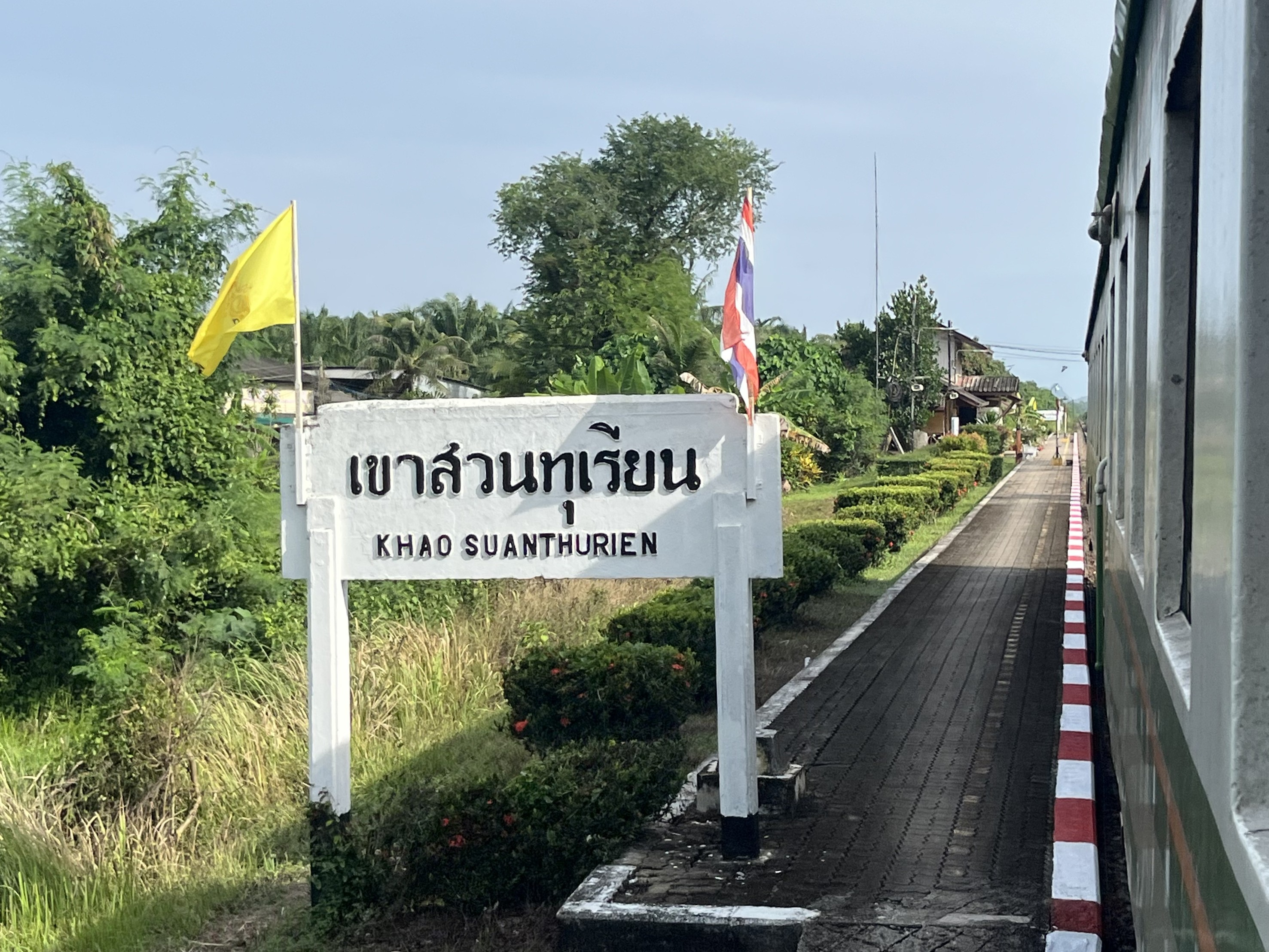

General information
- Location: National Highway No. 4198, Mu 1 (Ban Khao Suan Thurian), Na Pho Subdistrict, Sawi District, Chumphon
- Owner: State Railway of Thailand
- Line: Southern Line
- Platforms: 1
- Tracks: 2

Other information
- Station code: ขร.

Services
Preceding station	State Railway of Thailand	Following station
Sawi towards Hua Lamphong or Krung Thep Aphiwat	Southern Line	Khao Pip Halt towards Su-ngai Kolok
Location

Khao Suan Thurian railway station is a railway station located in Na Pho Subdistrict, Sawi District, Chumphon. It is a class 3 railway station located 508.517 km (316.0 mi) from Thon Buri railway station.

== Train services ==
- Ordinary No. 254/255 Lang Suan-Thon Buri-Lang Suan
- Local No. 445/446 Chumphon-Hat Yai Junction-Chumphon

== Gallery ==
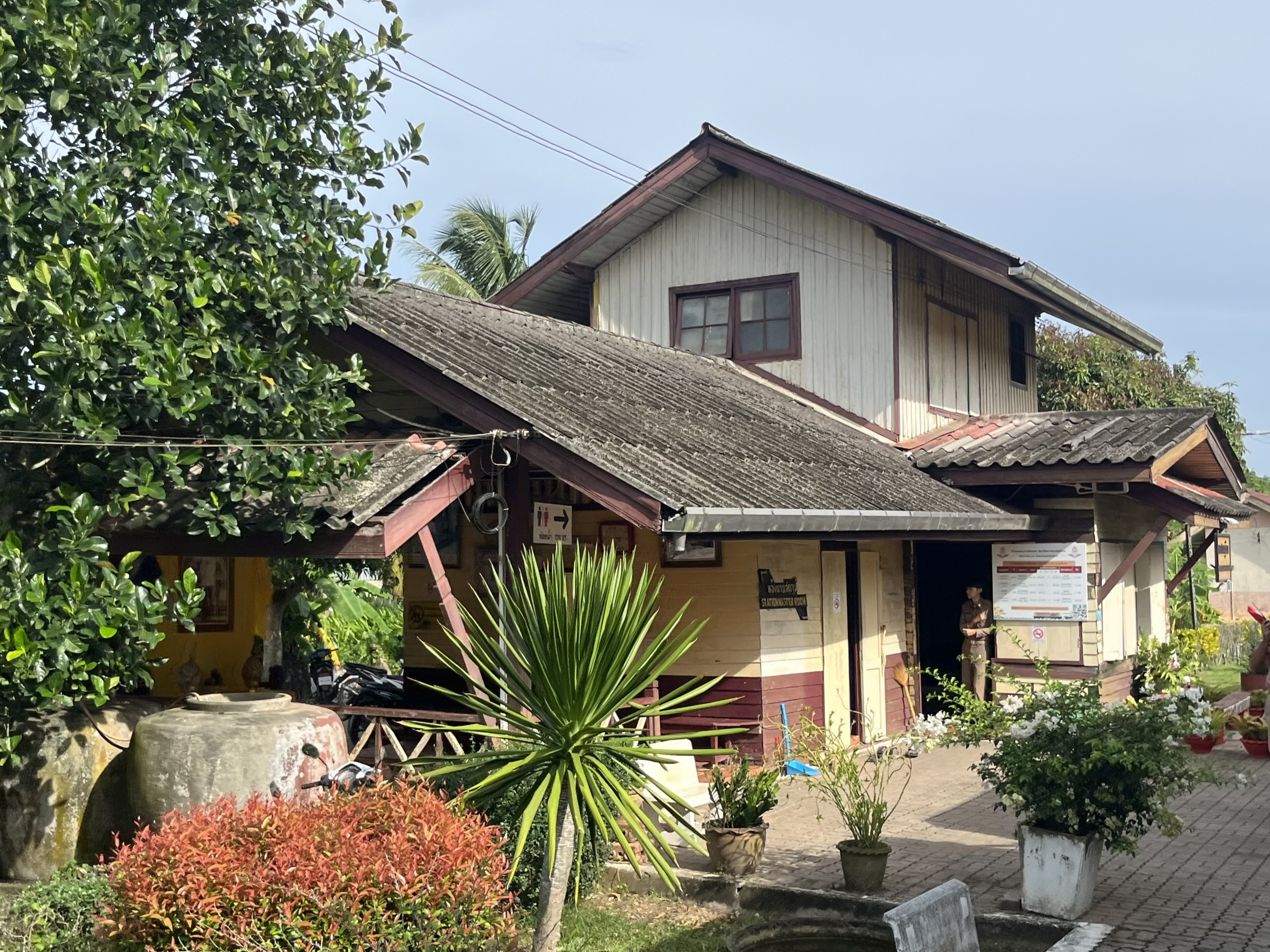
Station building
