= Khlong Ya railway halt =

Railway station in Thailand

Coordinates: 8°55′34″N 99°18′4″E

Khlong Ya คลองยา

General information
- Location: Mu 6 (Ban Khlong Ya), Na Tai Subdistrict, Ban Na Doem District, Surat Thani
- Owner: State Railway of Thailand
- Line: Southern Line
- Platforms: 1
- Tracks: 1

Other information
- Station code: ยา.

Services
Preceding station	State Railway of Thailand	Following station
Khao Phlu towards Hua Lamphong or Krung Thep Aphiwat	Southern Line	Ban Na towards Su-ngai Kolok
Location

Khlong Ya Railway Halt is a railway halt located in Na Tai Subdistrict, Ban Na Doem District, Surat Thani. It is located 657.769 km (408.7 mi) from Thon Buri Railway Station.

== Train services ==
- Local No. 445/446 Chumphon-Hat Yai Junction-Chumphon
- Local No. 447/448 Surat Thani-Sungai Kolok-Surat Thani
