= Khlong Sun railway halt =

Railway station in Thailand

Coordinates: 8°39′24″N 99°21′39″E

Khlong Sun คลองสูญ

General information
- Location: Mu 5 (Ban Khlong Sun), Phruphi Subdistrict, Ban Na San District, Surat Thani
- Owner: State Railway of Thailand
- Line: Southern Line
- Platforms: 1
- Tracks: 1

Other information
- Station code: คู.

Services
Preceding station	State Railway of Thailand	Following station
Phruphi towards Hua Lamphong or Krung Thep Aphiwat	Southern Line	Ban Song towards Su-ngai Kolok
Location

Khlong Sun Railway Halt is a railway halt located in Phruphi Subdistrict, Ban Na San District, Surat Thani, Thailand. It is located 687.729 km (427.3 mi) from Thon Buri Railway Station.

== Train services ==
- Local No. 447/448 Surat Thani-Sungai Kolok-Surat Thani
