= Khlong Chang railway station =

Railway station in Thailand

Coordinates: 8.2414°N 99.6216°E

Khlong Chang คลองจัง

General information
- Location: Mu 4 (Ban Khlong Chang), Na Bon Subdistrict, Na Bon District, Nakhon Si Thammarat
- Owner: State Railway of Thailand
- Line: Southern Line
- Platforms: 1
- Tracks: 3

Other information
- Station code: คจ.

Services
Preceding station	State Railway of Thailand	Following station
Na Bon towards Hua Lamphong or Krung Thep Aphiwat	Southern Line	Ban Ko Pring Halt towards Su-ngai Kolok
Location

Khlong Chang railway station is a railway station located in Na Bon Subdistrict, Na Bon District, Nakhon Si Thammarat. It is a class 3 railway station located 747.035 km (464.2 mi) from Thon Buri railway station.

== Train services ==
- Rapid No. 167/168 Bangkok-Kantang-Bangkok
- Local No. 445/446 Chumphon-Hat Yai Junction-Chumphon
- Local No. 447/448 Surat Thani-Sungai Kolok-Surat Thani
