= Su-ngai Padi railway station =

Railway station in Paluru, Thailand

Su-ngai Padi สุไหงปาดี
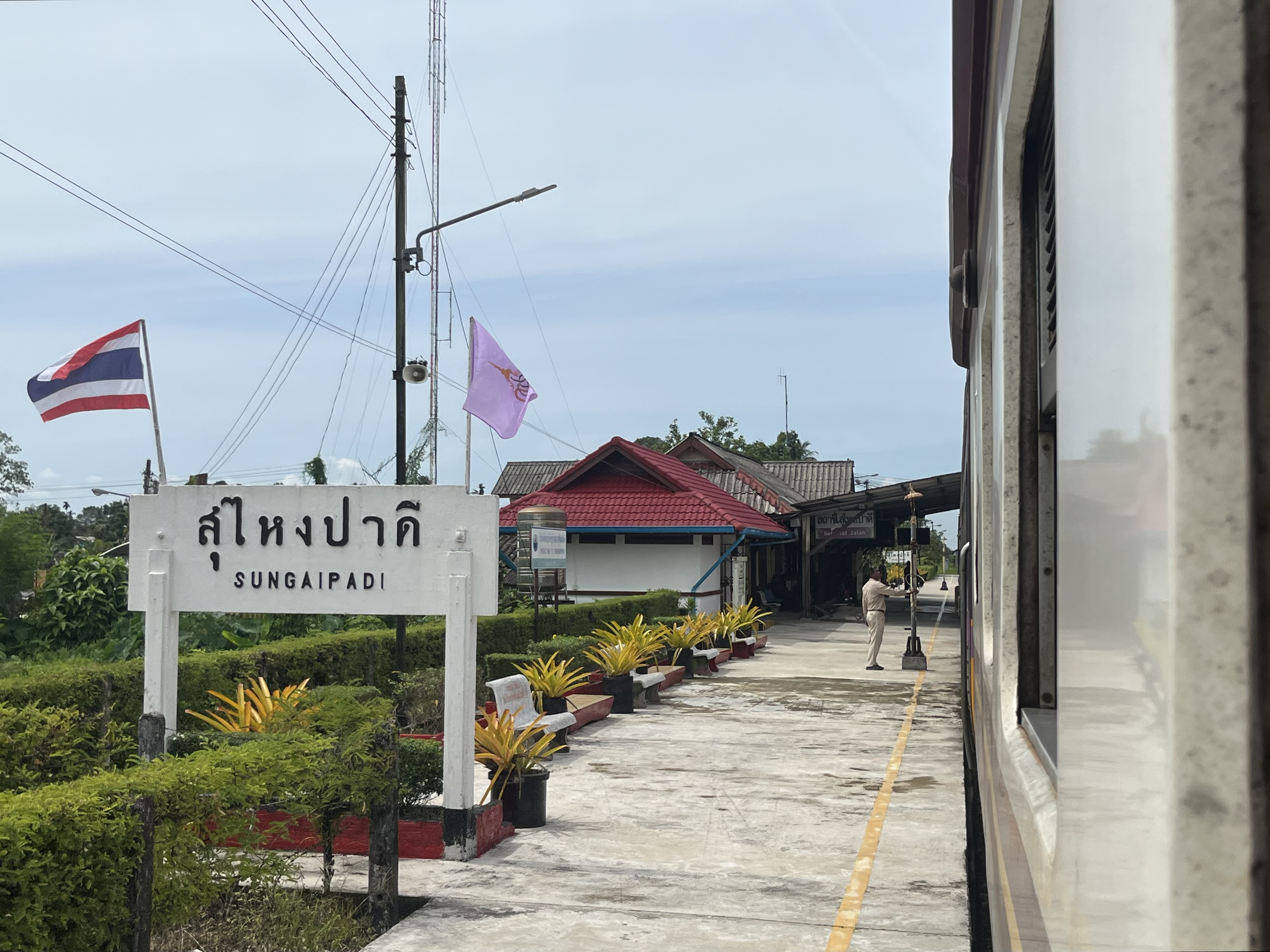

General information
- Location: Paluru Subdistrict, Su-ngai Padi District, Narathiwat
- Coordinates: 6.0859°N 101.8810°E
- Owner: State Railway of Thailand
- Line: Southern Line
- Platforms: 2
- Tracks: 3

Other information
- Station code: งด.

Services
Preceding station	State Railway of Thailand	Following station
To Deng towards Hua Lamphong or Krung Thep Aphiwat	Southern Line	Khok Saya Halt towards Su-ngai Kolok
Location

Su-ngai Padi railway station is a railway station located in Paluru Subdistrict, Su-ngai Padi District, Narathiwat, Thailand. It is a class 2 railway station located 1,130.1 km (702.2 mi) from Thon Buri railway station.

== Services ==
- Special Express No. 37/38 Bangkok-Sungai Kolok-Bangkok
- Rapid No. 171/172 Bangkok-Sungai Kolok-Bangkok
- Rapid No. 175/176 Hat Yai Junction-Sungai Kolok-Hat Yai Junction
- Local No. 447/448 Surat Thani-Sungai Kolok-Surat Thani
- Local No. 451/452 Nakhon Si Thammarat-Sungai Kolok-Nakhon Si Thammarat
- Local No. 453/454 Yala-Sungai Kolok-Yala
- Local No. 463/464 Phatthalung-Sungai Kolok-Phatthalung
