= Ban Song railway station =

Railway station in Thailand

Coordinates: 8.6343°N 99.3721°E

Ban Song บ้านส้อง
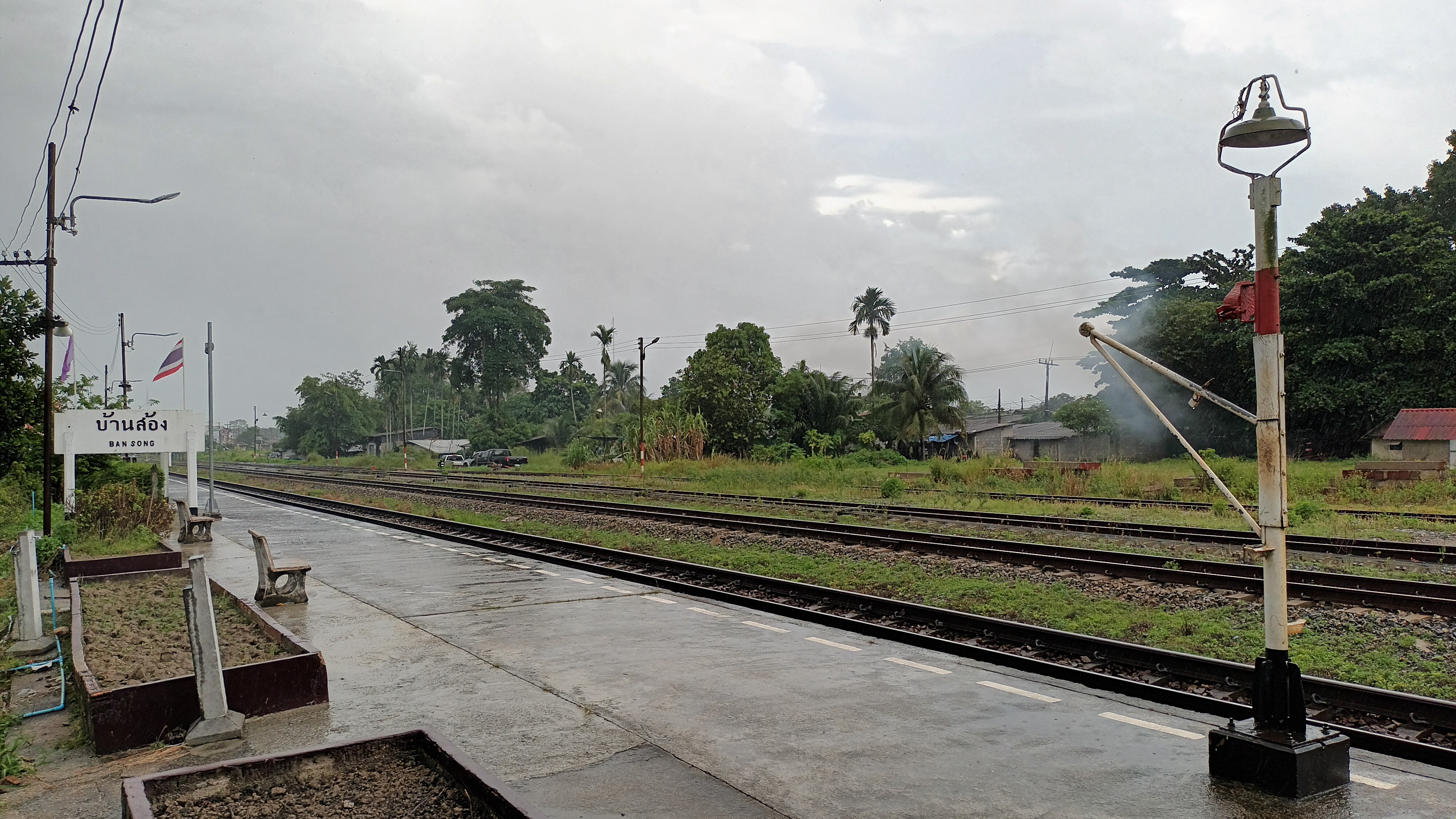
- Platforms

General information
- Location: National Highway No. 4009, Ban Song Subdistrict, Wiang Sa District, Surat Thani
- Owner: State Railway of Thailand
- Line: Southern Line
- Platforms: 1
- Tracks: 4

Other information
- Station code: สอ.

History
- Former names: Khlong Tan

Services
Preceding station	State Railway of Thailand	Following station
Khlong Sun Halt towards Hua Lamphong or Krung Thep Aphiwat	Southern Line	Ban Phru Krachaeng towards Su-ngai Kolok
Location

Ban Song station (Thai: สถานีบ้านส้อง) is a railway station located in Ban Song Subdistrict, Wiang Sa District, Surat Thani. It is a class 1 railway station located 692.739 km (430.4 mi) from Thon Buri railway station.
