= Na Prue railway halt =

Railway station in Khuan Maphrao, Thailand

Coordinates: 7.594°N 100.0932°E

Na Prue นาปรือ

General information
- Location: Mu 5 (Ban Na Prue), Khuan Maphrao Subdistrict, Phatthalung City
- Owner: State Railway of Thailand
- Line: Southern Line
- Platforms: 1
- Tracks: 1

Other information
- Station code: ปร.

Services
Preceding station	State Railway of Thailand	Following station
Phatthalung towards Hua Lamphong or Krung Thep Aphiwat	Southern Line	Ban Khai Thai Halt towards Su-ngai Kolok
Location

Na Prue Railway Halt is a railway halt located in Khuan Maphrao Subdistrict, Phatthalung City, Phatthalung. It is located 849.071 km (527.6 mi) from Thon Buri Railway Station.

== Train services ==
- Local No. 445/446 Chumphon-Hat Yai Junction-Chumphon
- Local No. 448 Sungai Kolok-Surat Thani
- Local No. 455/456 Nakhon Si Thammarat-Yala-Nakhon Si Thammarat
- Local No. 463/464 Phatthalung-Sungai Kolok-Phatthalung
