= Ban Ko Pring railway halt =

Railway halt in Thailand

Ban Ko Pring บ้านเกาะปริง

General information
- Location: Nong Hong Subdistrict, Thung Song District, Nakhon Si Thammarat
- Coordinates: 8.21327°N 99.64494°E
- Owner: State Railway of Thailand
- Line: Southern Line
- Platforms: 1
- Tracks: 1

Other information
- Station code: ะป.

Services
Preceding station	State Railway of Thailand	Following station
Khlong Chang towards Hua Lamphong or Krung Thep Aphiwat	Southern Line	Thung Song Junction towards Su-ngai Kolok
Location

Ban Ko Pring Halt (Thai: ที่หยุดรถบ้านเกาะปริง) is a railway halt located in Nong Hong Subdistrict, Thung Song District, Nakhon Si Thammarat. It is located 751.031 km (466.7 mi) from Thon Buri Railway Station

== Train services ==
- Local No. 445/446 Chumphon-Hat Yai Junction-Chumphon
- Local No. 447/448 Surat Thani-Sungai Kolok-Surat Thani
