= Khlong Kui railway halt =

Railway halt in Thailand

Khlong Kui คลองกุย

General information
- Location: Mu 8 (Ban Khlong Kui), Chang Klang Subdistrict, Chang Klang District, Nakhon Si Thammarat
- Owner: State Railway of Thailand
- Line: Southern Line
- Platforms: 1
- Tracks: 1

Other information
- Station code: อก.

Services
Preceding station	State Railway of Thailand	Following station
Lak Chang towards Hua Lamphong or Krung Thep Aphiwat	Southern Line	Na Bon towards Su-ngai Kolok
Location

Khlong Kui Railway Halt is a railway station located in Chang Klang Subdistrict, Chang Klang District, Nakhon Si Thammarat. It is located 738.904 km (459.1 mi) from Thon Buri Railway Station

== Train services ==
- Local No. 445/446 Chumphon-Hat Yai Junction-Chumphon
- Local No. 447/448 Surat Thani-Sungai Kolok-Surat Thani
