= Sa Kosi Narai railway station =

Railway station in Thailand

Sa Kosi Narai สระโกสินารายณ์
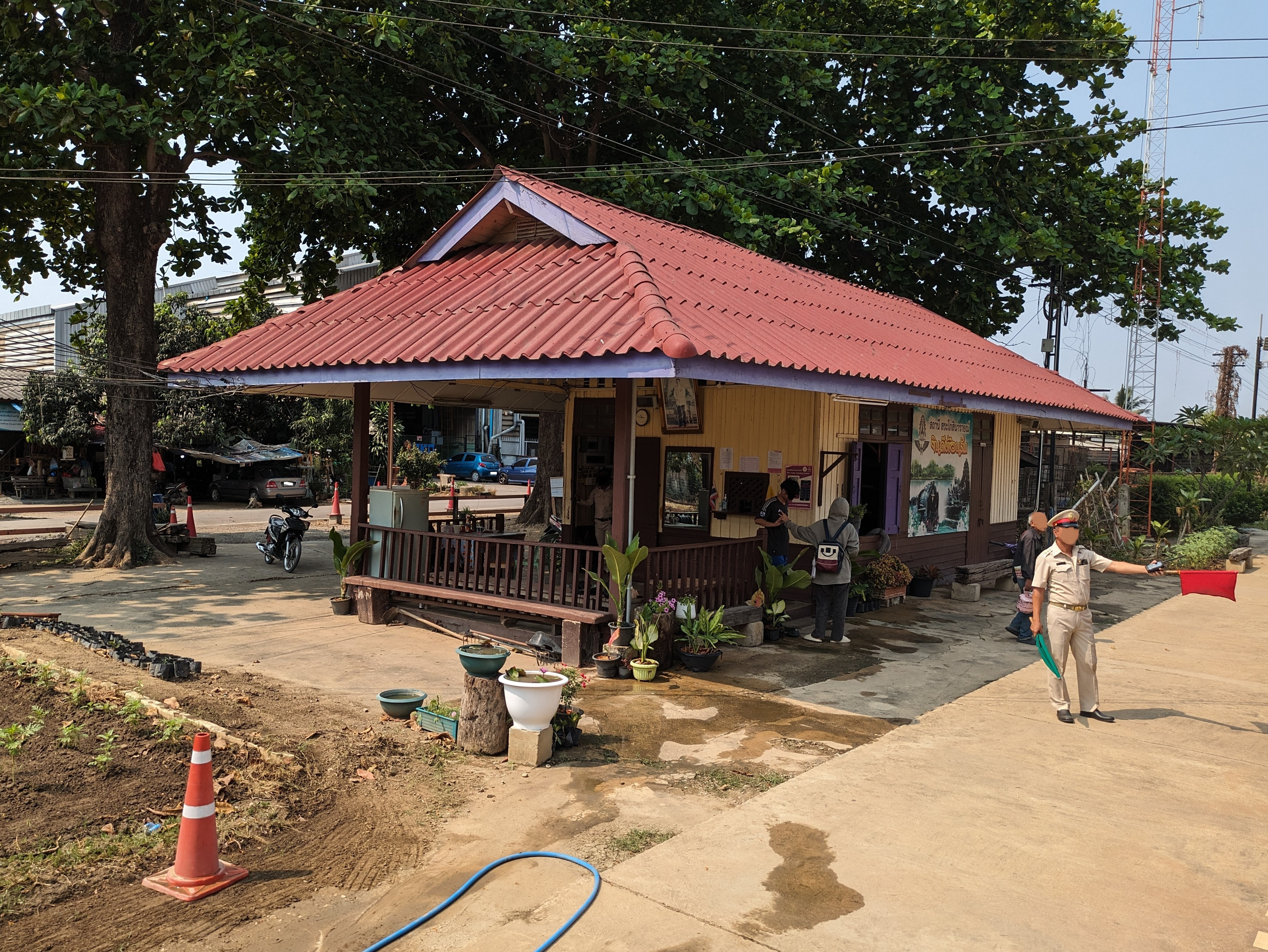

General information
- Location: Tha Pha Subdistrict, Ban Pong District; Ratchaburi Province; Thailand
- Coordinates: 13.8503°N 99.8495°E
- Operator: State Railway of Thailand
- Manager: Ministry of Transport
- Line: Nam Tok Line (Death Railway)
- Platforms: 1
- Tracks: 2

Construction
- Structure type: At-grade

Other information
- Station code: สโ.
- Classification: Class 2

History
- Former names: Ban Pong Mai

Services
Preceding station	State Railway of Thailand	Following station
Thanon Songpol Halt towards Nong Pladuk Junction	Southern Line Burma Railway	Luk Kae towards Nam Tok Sai Yok Noi Halt
Location

Sa Kosi Narai railway station is a railway station located in Tha Pha Subdistrict, Ban Pong District, Ratchaburi Province. It is a class 2 railway station located 73.65 km (45.8 mi) from Thon Buri railway station.

Initially opened under the name “Ban Pong Mai” in 1949, located at 69.12 km (42.9 mi). It was later moved to the current location and opened on 1 May 1972 as a freight station for Siam Kraft Company, with a branch line running into the factory (now abandoned). It was then renamed to “Sa Kosi Narai” after a pond to the north of the station, which was part of Kosi Narai Ancient City.
