= Huai Mut railway station =

Railway station in Surat Thani, Thailand

Coordinates: 8.8354°N 99.3498°E

Huai Mut ห้วยมุด

General information
- Location: Surat Thani Local Road No. 2048, Ban Huai Mut, Na San Subdistrict, Ban Na San District, Surat Thani
- Owner: State Railway of Thailand
- Line: Southern Line
- Platforms: 1
- Tracks: 2

Other information
- Station code: มด.

Services
Preceding station	State Railway of Thailand	Following station
Ban Na towards Hua Lamphong or Krung Thep Aphiwat	Southern Line	Na San towards Su-ngai Kolok
Location

Huai Mut railway station is a railway station located in Na San Subdistrict, Ban Na San District, Surat Thani. It is a class 3 railway station located 669.68 km (416.1 mi) from Thon Buri railway station.

== Train services ==
- Rapid No. 173/174 Bangkok-Nakhon Si Thammarat-Bangkok
- Local No. 445/446 Chumphon-Hat Yai Junction-Chumphon
- Local No. 447/448 Surat Thani-Sungai Kolok-Surat Thani
