= Wang Yen railway station =

Railway station in Thailand

Wang Yen วังเย็น
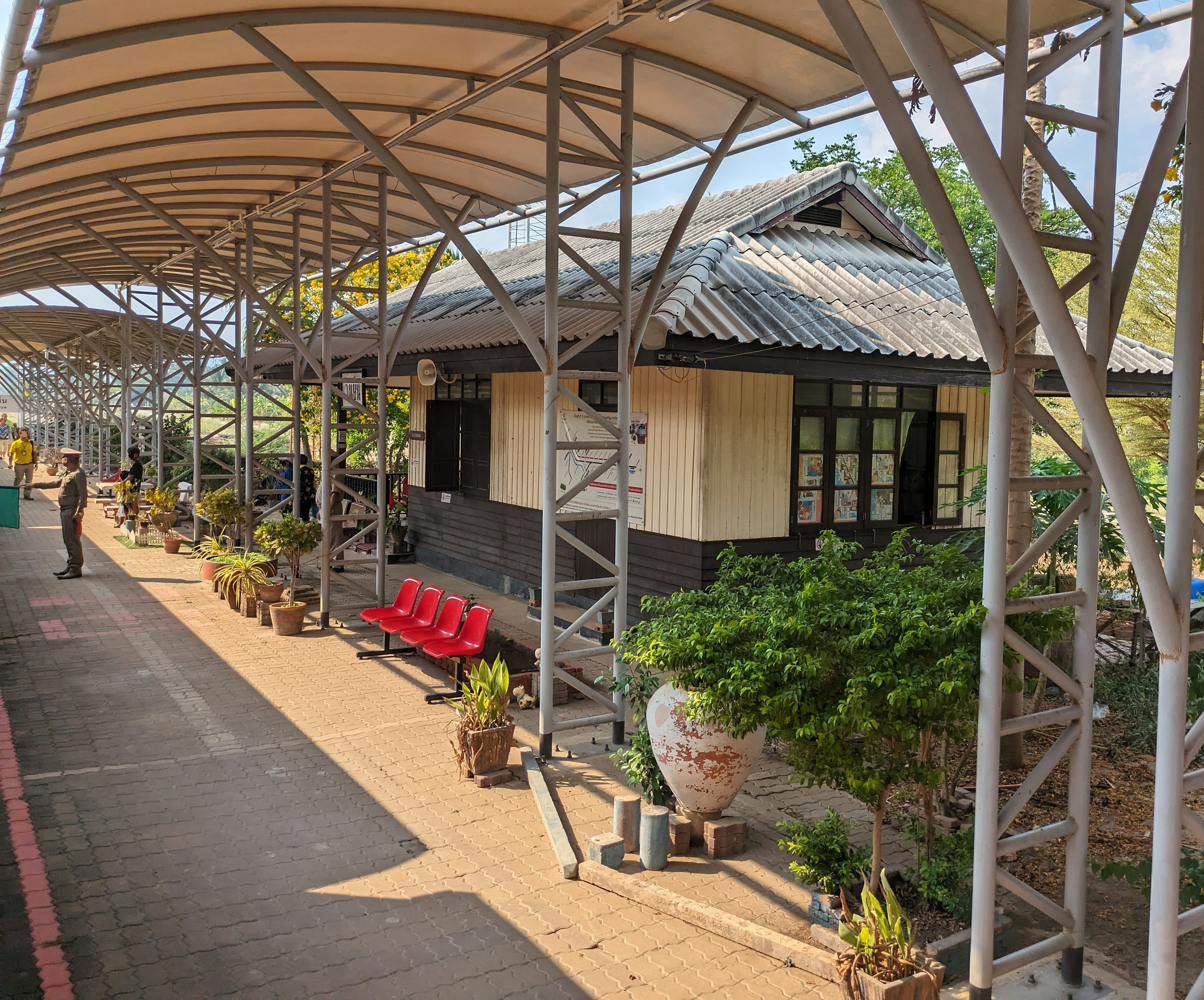

General information
- Location: Wang Yen Subdistrict, Mueang Kanchanaburi District; Kanchanaburi Province; Thailand
- Coordinates: 13.9433°N 99.4160°E
- Operator: State Railway of Thailand
- Line: Nam Tok Line (Death Railway)
- Platforms: 1
- Tracks: 2

Construction
- Structure type: At-grade

Other information
- Station code: วย.
- Classification: Class 2

Services
Preceding station	State Railway of Thailand	Following station
Na Kann Halt towards Nong Pladuk Junction	Southern Line Burma Railway	Wang Takhian Halt towards Nam Tok Sai Yok Noi Halt
Location

Wang Yen railway station is a railway station located in Wang Yen Subdistrict, Mueang Kanchanaburi District, Kanchanaburi Province. It is a class 2 railway station located 140.15 km (87.1 mi) from Bangkok railway station.
