= Tha Kilen railway station =

Railway station in Thailand

Tha Kilen ท่ากิเลน
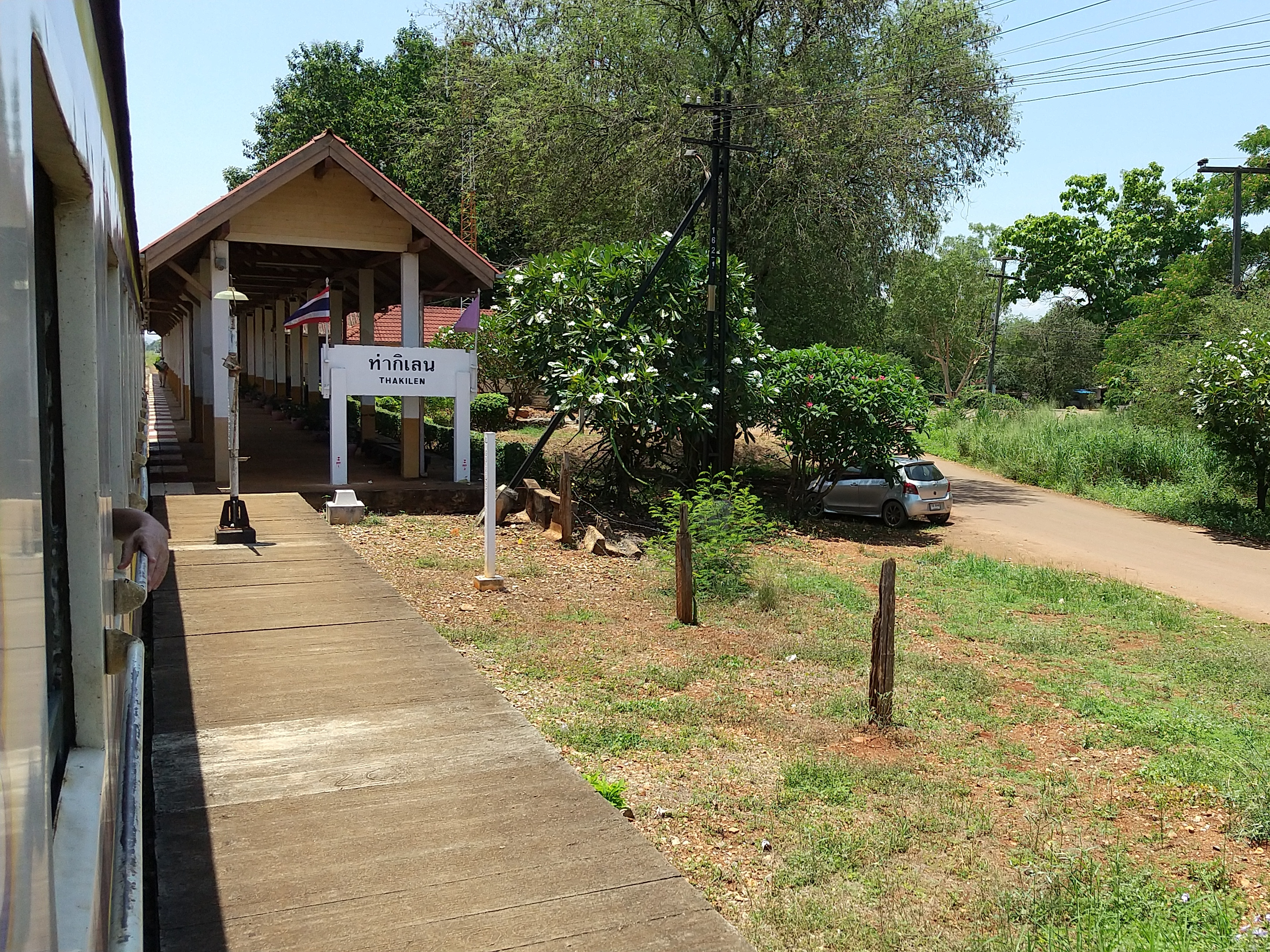

General information
- Location: Sing Subdistrict, Sai Yok District; Kanchanaburi Province; Thailand
- Coordinates: 14.0406°N 99.2572°E
- Operator: State Railway of Thailand
- Line: Nam Tok Line (Death Railway)
- Platforms: 1
- Tracks: 2

Construction
- Structure type: At-grade

Other information
- Station code: กน.
- Classification: Class 2

Services
Preceding station	State Railway of Thailand	Following station
Tha Ta Suea Halt towards Nong Pladuk Junction	Southern Line Burma Railway	Wang Sing Halt towards Nam Tok Sai Yok Noi Halt
Location

Tha Kilen railway station is a railway station located in Sing Subdistrict, Sai Yok District, Kanchanaburi Province. It is a class 2 railway station located 161.95 km (100.6 mi) from Bangkok railway station. It is located near the Mueang Sing Historical Park.

Tha Kilen (also: Takalin) was a Japanese prisoner of war work camp during World War II. The camp was initially used for the construction of the Burma Railway, and was located 98 kilometres from Nong Pladuk. The first prisoners arrived in February 1943. Prisoners returned in April 1945 for maintenance work. On 7 April 1945, 8 were killed during an allied bombardment, because they were not allowed to take shelter by the Japanese guards.
