= Thon Buri railway station =

Railway station in Bangkok, Thailand

Coordinates: 13.7606°N 100.4789°E

Thon Buri ธนบุรี
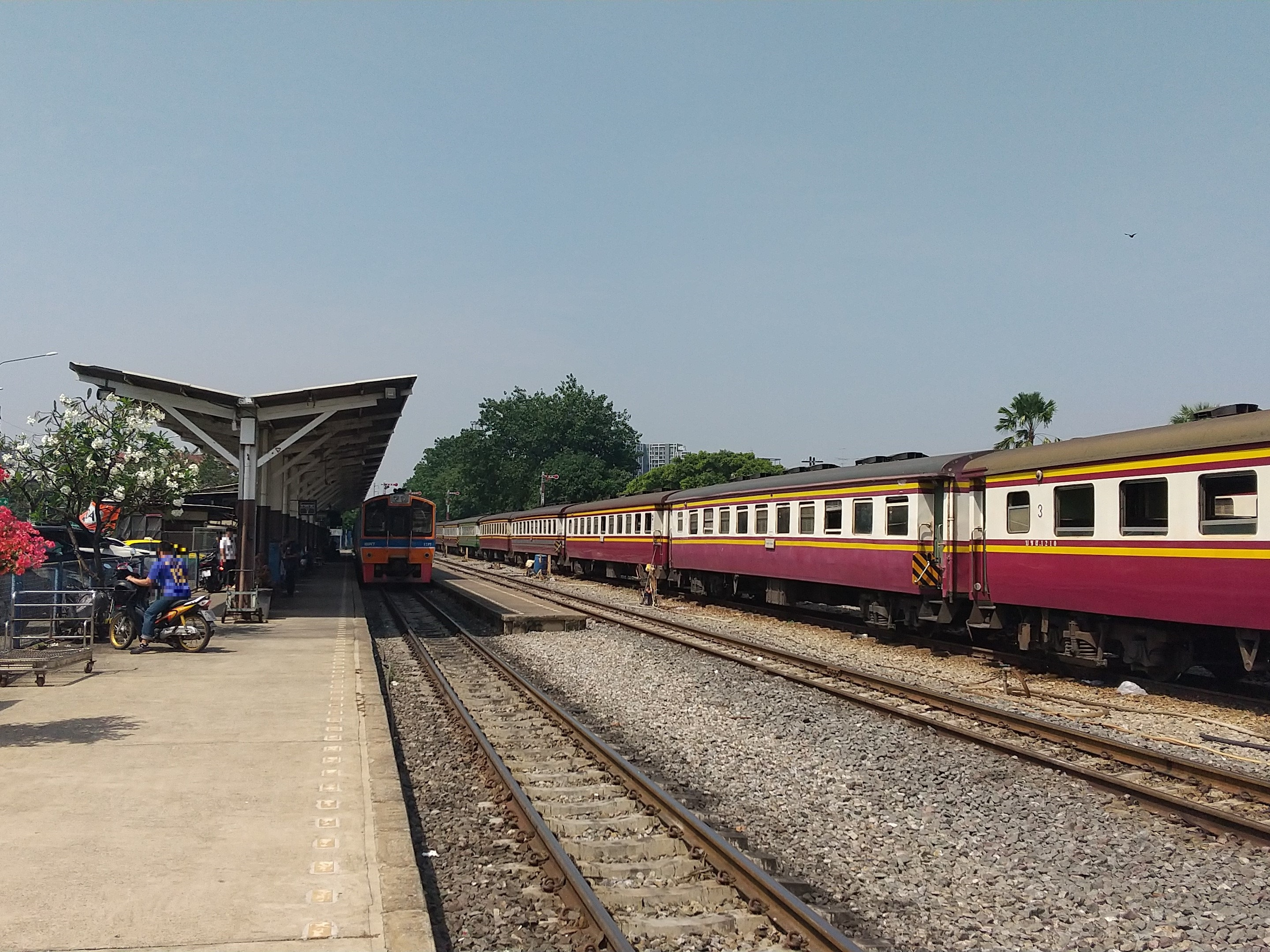

General information
- Location: Rotfai Road, Siriraj Subdistrict, Bangkok Noi District; Bangkok; Thailand
- Operator: State Railway of Thailand
- Manager: Ministry of Transport
- Line: Thon Buri Line
- Platforms: 2
- Tracks: 5
- Connections: BMTA/TSB Bus; Chao Phraya Express Boat / Thai Smile Boat; Taxi / Motorcycle taxi

Construction
- Structure type: At-grade
- Parking: Yes

Other information
- Status: Terminus for ordinary and commuter trains
- Station code: ธบ.
- Classification: Class 1

History
- Opened: 1999
- Former names: Bangkok Noi

Services
Preceding station	State Railway of Thailand	Following station
Terminus	Southern Line Thon Buri Line	Charansanitwong Halt towards Taling Chan
Location

Thon Buri railway station (Thai: สถานีรถไฟธนบุรี) formerly known as Bangkok Noi railway station (สถานีรถไฟบางกอกน้อย), is a class 1 railway station and the current terminus of the Thon Buri Branch Line in Bangkok. Near the station is a railway depot that maintains five functional steam locomotives, which are operated on four special occasions each year. Thon Buri station is the only station in Bangkok that where railway semaphore signals (although unused) are still present on the station grounds.

Despite its name, the station is not located in Thon Buri district, which instead is located in Bangkok Noi district.

== History ==
Originally, the station's location was located at Bangkok Noi railway station. It opened in 1903 as a terminus for all Southern Line services. The station marked the 0 km point for the Southern Line. During World War II it was bombed by the Allies as it served as a Japanese logistical centre. After the war, the station was rebuilt and was named Thon Buri, opening in 1950. Over the years, Thon Buri Station's role as a major terminal declined as most train services moved to terminate at Bangkok railway station, leaving only ordinary and commuter trains to end here.

In 1999, Chuan Leekpai started a project to renovate the Thon Buri Station area, a temporary class 4 railway station was constructed at the present-day location, about 800 metres from the original location. This station was to be called Bangkok Noi Station. The original Thon Buri Station still opened for ticketing, but passengers boarded at the temporary station. However, this arrangement was later discontinued.

During Thaksin Shinawatra's government, trains continued services to the original Thon Buri Station. Then the land around the original Thon Buri railway station was granted to the Faculty of Medicine Siriraj Hospital. As a result, on 4 October 2003, services to the original Thon Buri Station stopped completely. The station building was given to Mahidol University, and all services were changed to terminate at Bangkok Noi Station. On 1 January 2004, Bangkok Noi railway station was renamed Thon Buri, and the station's class 4 status was upgraded to class 1.

As of 2015, the original Thon Buri railway station building houses the Siriraj Phimukhsthan Museum. The former temporary station is now the station in use. Despite fewer trains on the Southern Line terminating here compared to Bangkok, all distances along the Southern Line still refer to this station as kilometre 0.

== See also ==
- List of railway stations in Thailand
- Krung Thep Aphiwat Central Terminal
- Hua Lamphong railway station
