= Nong Chok railway station =

Railway station in Thailand

Coordinates: 12.9534°N 99.9665°E

Nong Chok หนองจอก
- Station in 2025

General information
- Location: Phetchaburi Local Road No. 2025, Nong Chok Subdistrict, Tha Yang District, Phetchaburi
- Owner: State Railway of Thailand
- Line: Southern Line
- Platforms: 3
- Tracks: 3

Other information
- Station code: หจ.

History
- Opened: 19 June 1911

Services
Preceding station	State Railway of Thailand	Following station
Nong Mai Luang towards Hua Lamphong or Krung Thep Aphiwat	Southern Line	Nong Sala towards Su-ngai Kolok
Location

Nong Chok railway station (Thai: สถานีหนองจอก) is a railway station located in Nong Chok Subdistrict, Tha Yang District, Phetchaburi. It is a class 3 railway station located 169.901 km (105.6 mi) from Thon Buri railway station. The station opened on 19 June 1911 as part of the Southern Line extension from Phetchaburi to Cha-am.

In 2023, the station was rebuilt as part of the double-track section from Nakhon Pathom to Chumphon. The station received a new building and elevated platforms.

== Services ==
- Ordinary 251/252 Thon Buri - Prachuap Khiri Khan - Thon Buri
- Ordinary 254/255 Lang Suan - Thon Buri - Lang Suan
- Ordinary 261/262 Bangkok - Suan Son Pradiphat - Bangkok

== Gallery ==
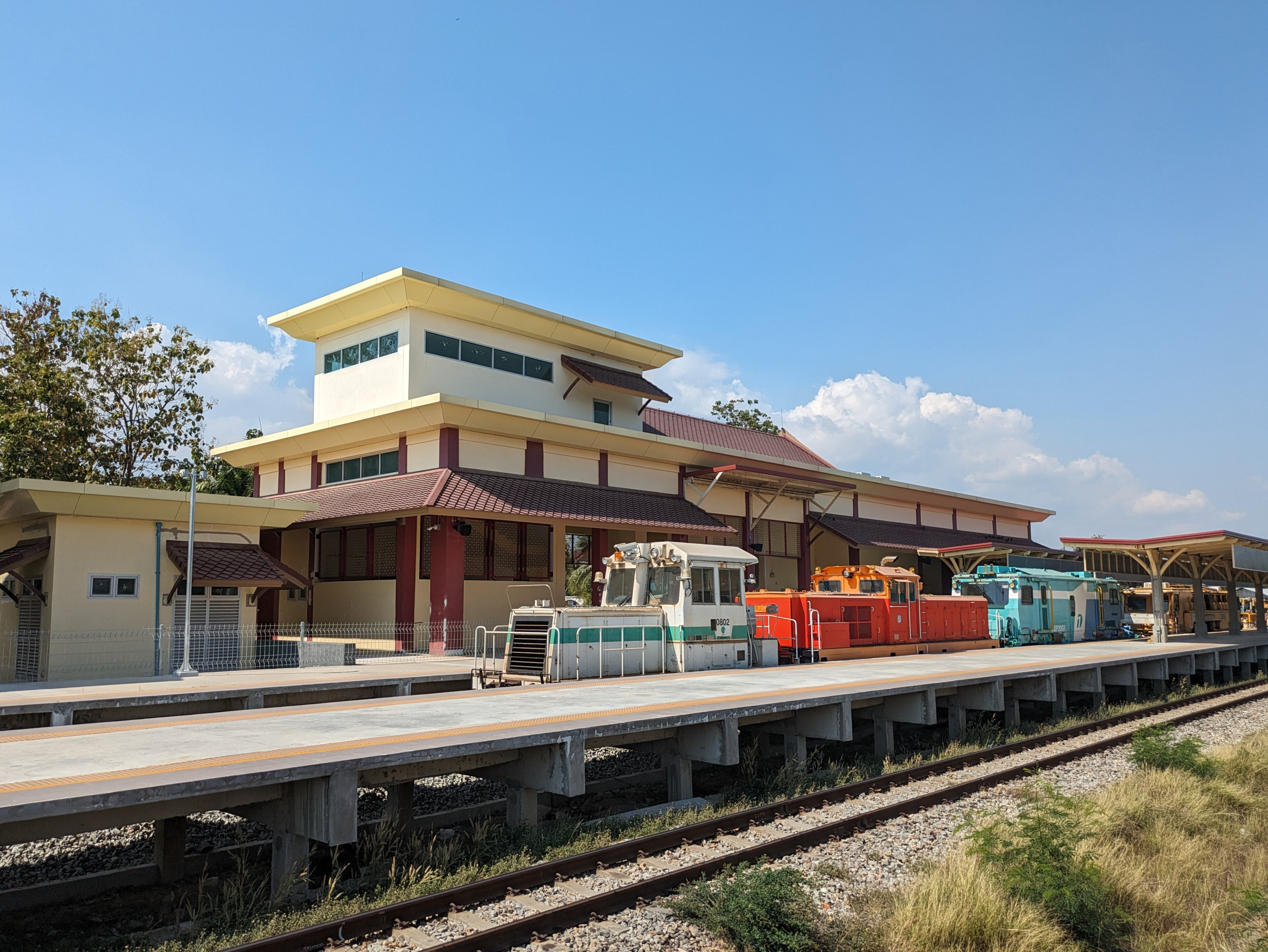
New station building

Temporary station office during the double-track construction.

Old station in 2020
