= Nong Mai Luang railway station =

Railway station in Thailand

Nong Mai Luang หนองไม้เหลือง
- Station in 2025

General information
- Location: Don Yang Subdistrict, Phetchaburi City
- Owner: State Railway of Thailand
- Line: Southern Line
- Platforms: 2
- Tracks: 2

Other information
- Station code: นม.

History
- Opened: 19 June 1911

Services
Preceding station	State Railway of Thailand	Following station
Khao Thamon towards Hua Lamphong or Krung Thep Aphiwat	Southern Line	Nong Chok towards Su-ngai Kolok
Location

Nong Mai Luang railway station (Thai: สถานีหนองไม้เหลือง) is a railway station located in Don Yang Subdistrict, Phetchaburi City, Phetchaburi. It is a class 3 railway station located 164.212 km (102.0 mi) from Thon Buri railway station. The station opened on 19 June 1911 as part of the Southern Line extension from Phetchaburi to Cha-am.

In 2023, the station was rebuilt as part of the double-track section from Nakhon Pathom to Chumphon. The station received a new building and elevated platforms.

== Services ==
- Ordinary 251/252 Thon Buri - Prachuap Khiri Khan - Thon Buri
- Ordinary 254/255 Lang Suan - Thon Buri - Lang Suan
- Ordinary 261/262 Bangkok - Suan Son Pradiphat - Bangkok

== Gallery ==
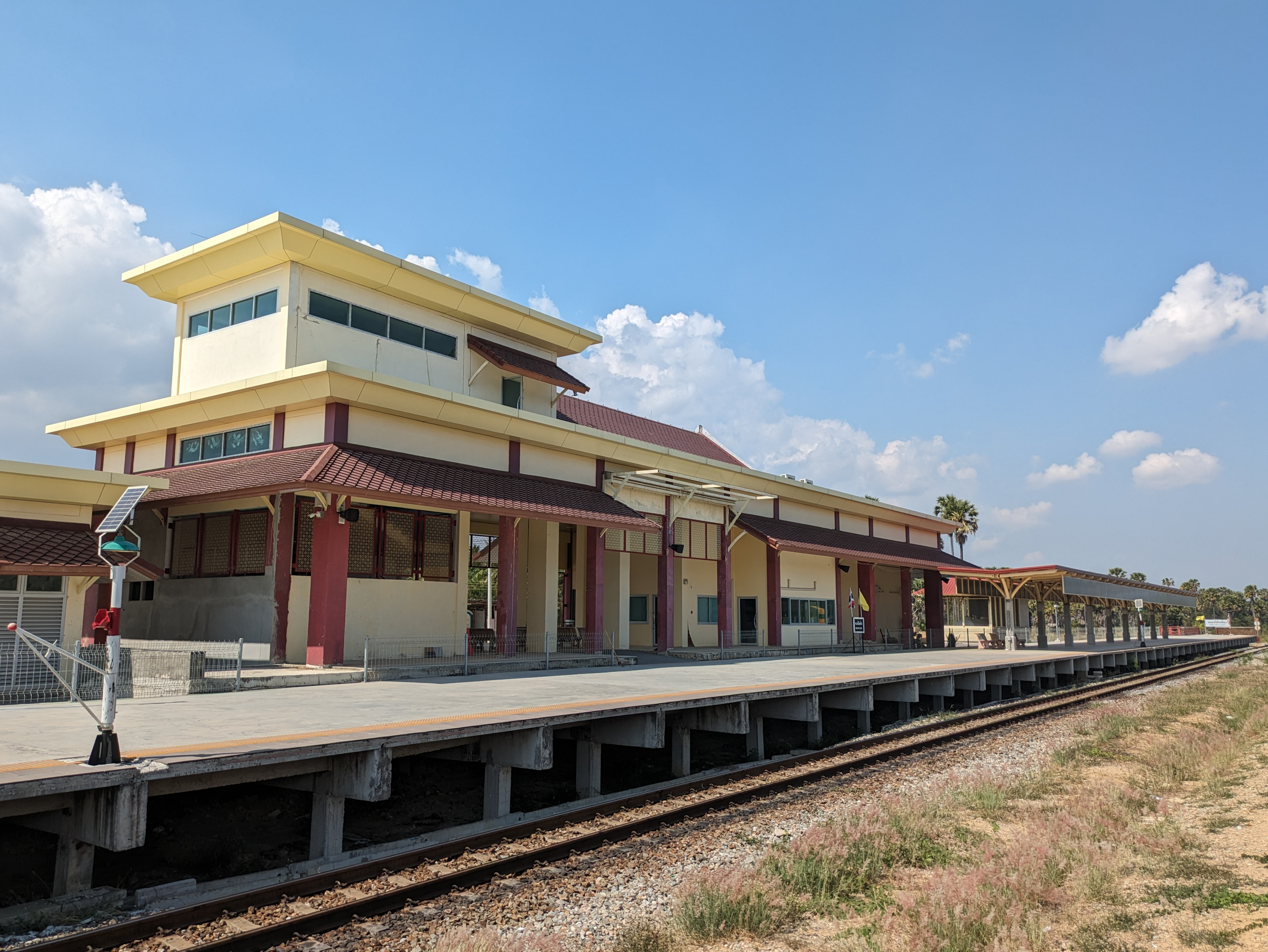
New station building
