= Pak Tho railway station =

Railway station in Pak Tho, Thailand

Pak Tho ปากท่อ
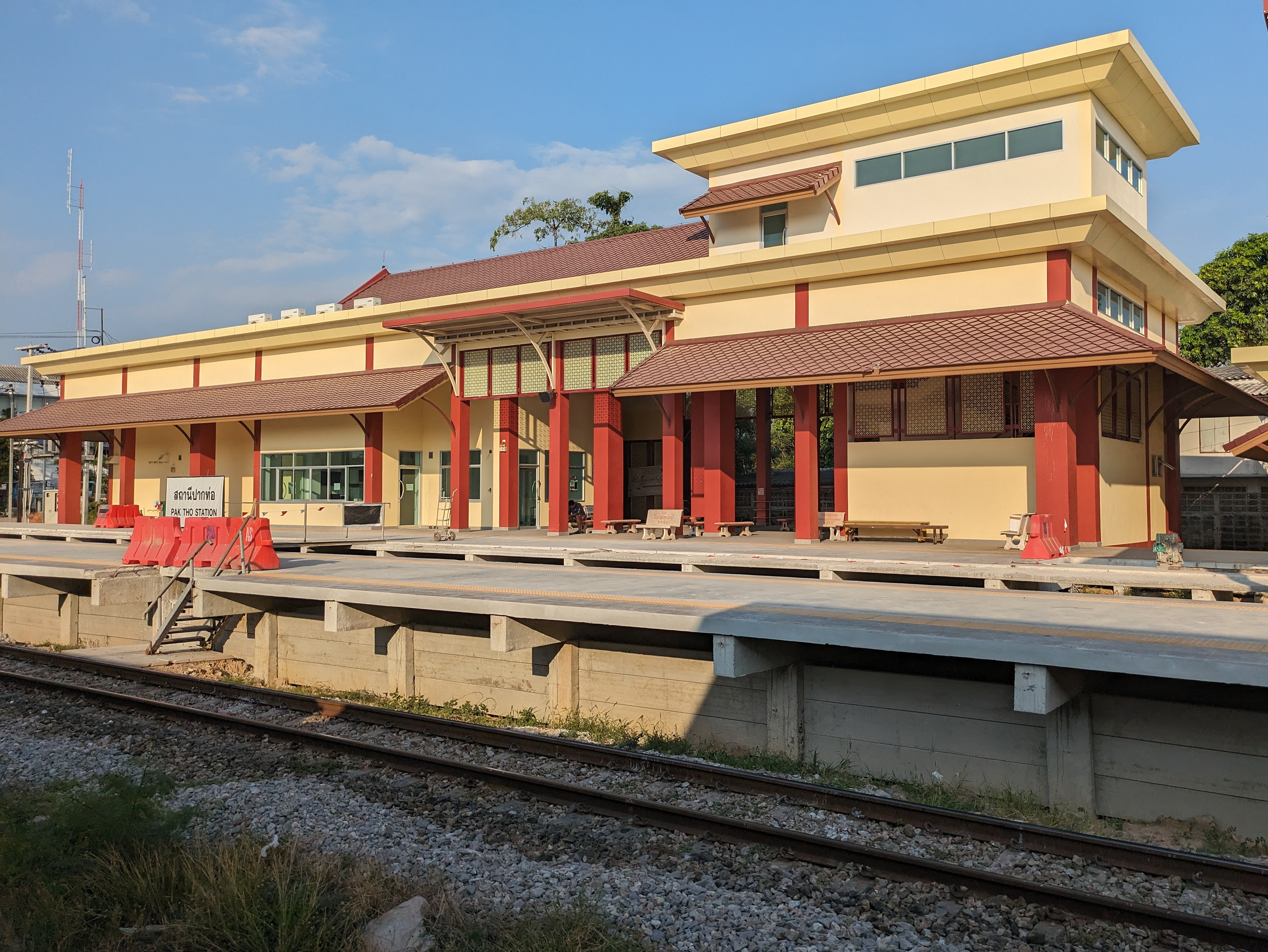
- Station in 2024

General information
- Location: Setthabut Road, Mu 5, Pak Tho Subdistrict, Pak Tho District, Ratchaburi
- Owner: State Railway of Thailand
- Line: Southern Line
- Platforms: 3
- Tracks: 3

Other information
- Station code: ปท.

History
- Opened: 19 June 1903
- Rebuilt: 2023
- Former names: Ban Pak Tho

Services
Preceding station	State Railway of Thailand	Following station
Ban Pa Kai Halt towards Hua Lamphong or Krung Thep Aphiwat	Southern Line	Huai Rong Halt towards Su-ngai Kolok
Location

Pak Tho railway station (Thai: สถานีปากท่อ) is a railway station located in Pak Tho Subdistrict, Pak Tho District, Ratchaburi. It is a class 2 railway station located 118.628 km (73.7 mi) from Thon Buri railway station and the main station for Pak Tho district.

== History ==
Pak Tho station opened on 19 June 1903 as part of the first phase of Southern Line from Bangkok Noi to Petchaburi. It was previously named Ban Pak Tho but later shortened to Pak Tho.

In 2023, the station was rebuilt as part of the double-track section from Nakhon Pathom - Chumphon. The new station featured elevated platforms and a new station building.

=== 2020 train collision ===
At about 18:30 on 24 February 2020, freight train No.722 (operated by Alsthom No.4210), running from Hat Yai junction to Phahon Yothin rail yard, collided head on with Thaksin Express No.37/45 (operated by GEA No. 4550) which was waiting on the passing loop for the freight train to pass. At least 30 people were injured.

== Services ==
- Rapid 169/170 Krung Thep Aphiwat - Yala - Krung Thep Aphiwat
- Ordinary 251/252 Thon Buri - Prachuap Khiri Khan - Thon Buri
- Ordinary 254/255 Lang Suan - Thon Buri - Lang Suan
- Ordinary 261/262 Bangkok - Suan Son Pradiphat - Bangkok

== Future ==
Pak Tho station (Thai: สถานีปากท่อ; Station code: RS42) is a planned railway station on the SRT Dark Red Line. In the future, the Maeklong Railway is planned to extend and meet the Southern Line mainline at this station, with 3 new stations between Mae Klong and Pak Tho.

== Gallery ==
Station in 2021

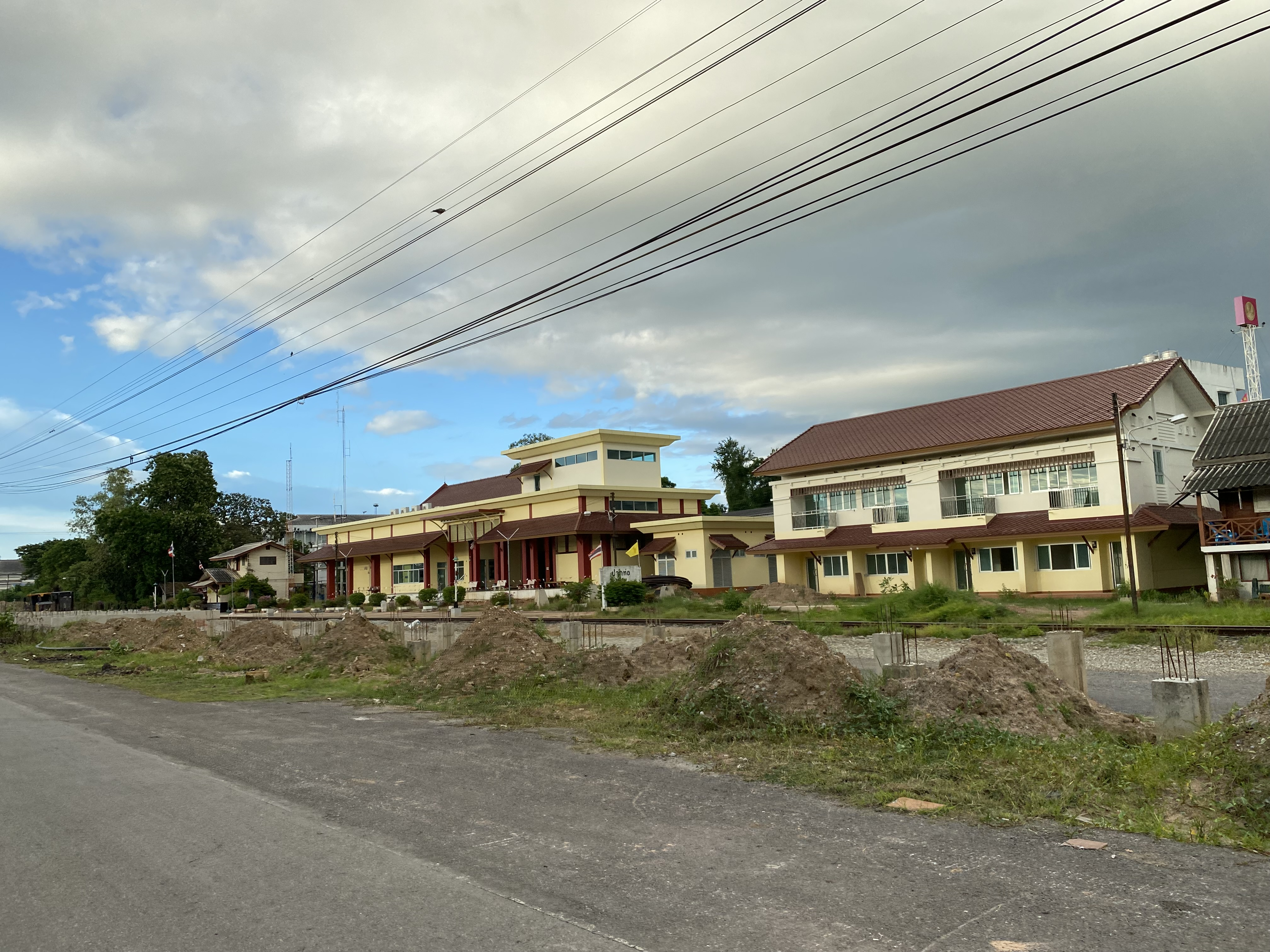
Station in 2022, during the double-track construction.

Damaged containers from the 2020 train collision

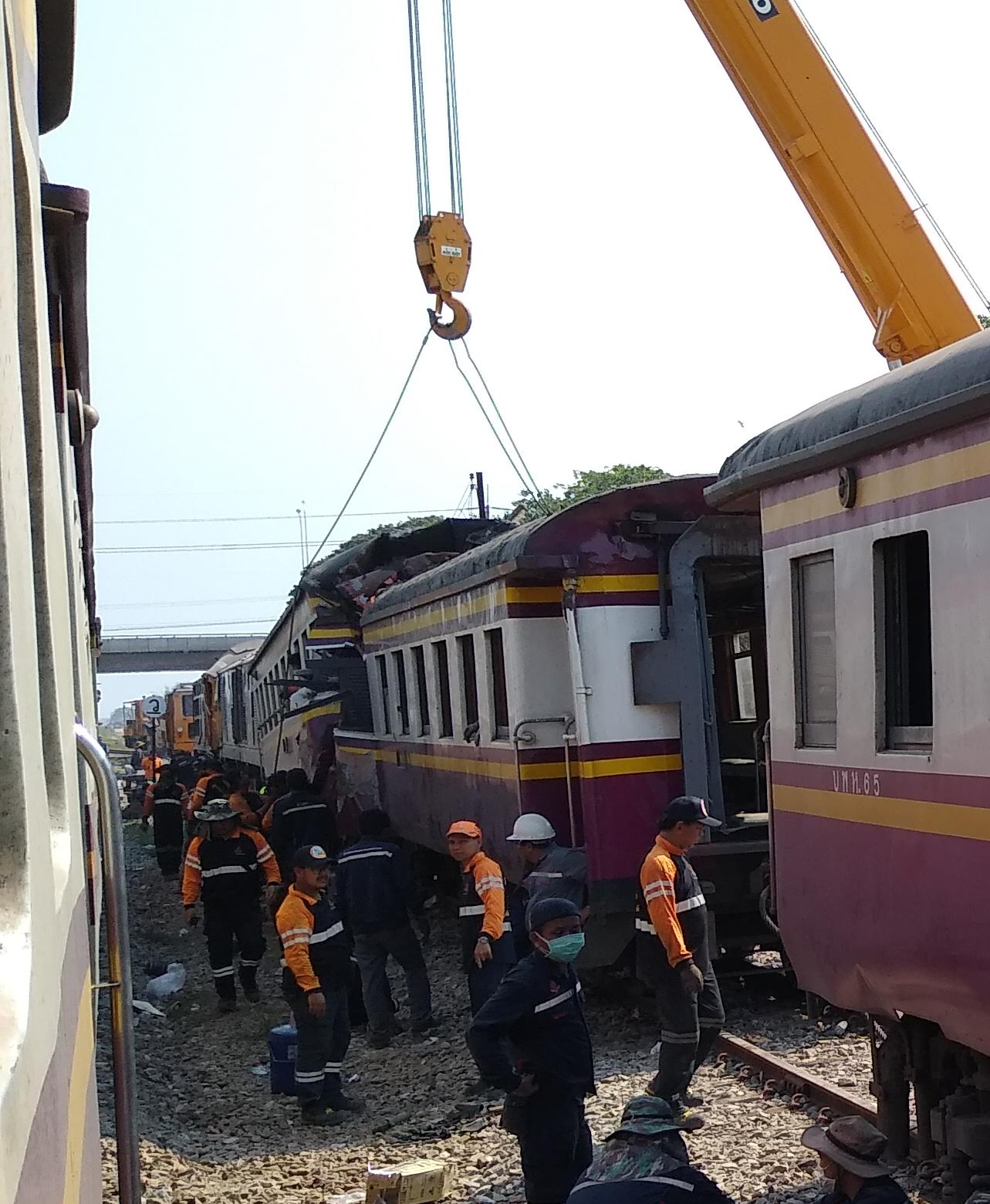
Wreckage of the Thaksin Express in the 2020 train collision
