= Nong Sala railway station =

Railway station in Thailand

Coordinates: 12.9031°N 99.9696°E

Nong Sala หนองศาลา
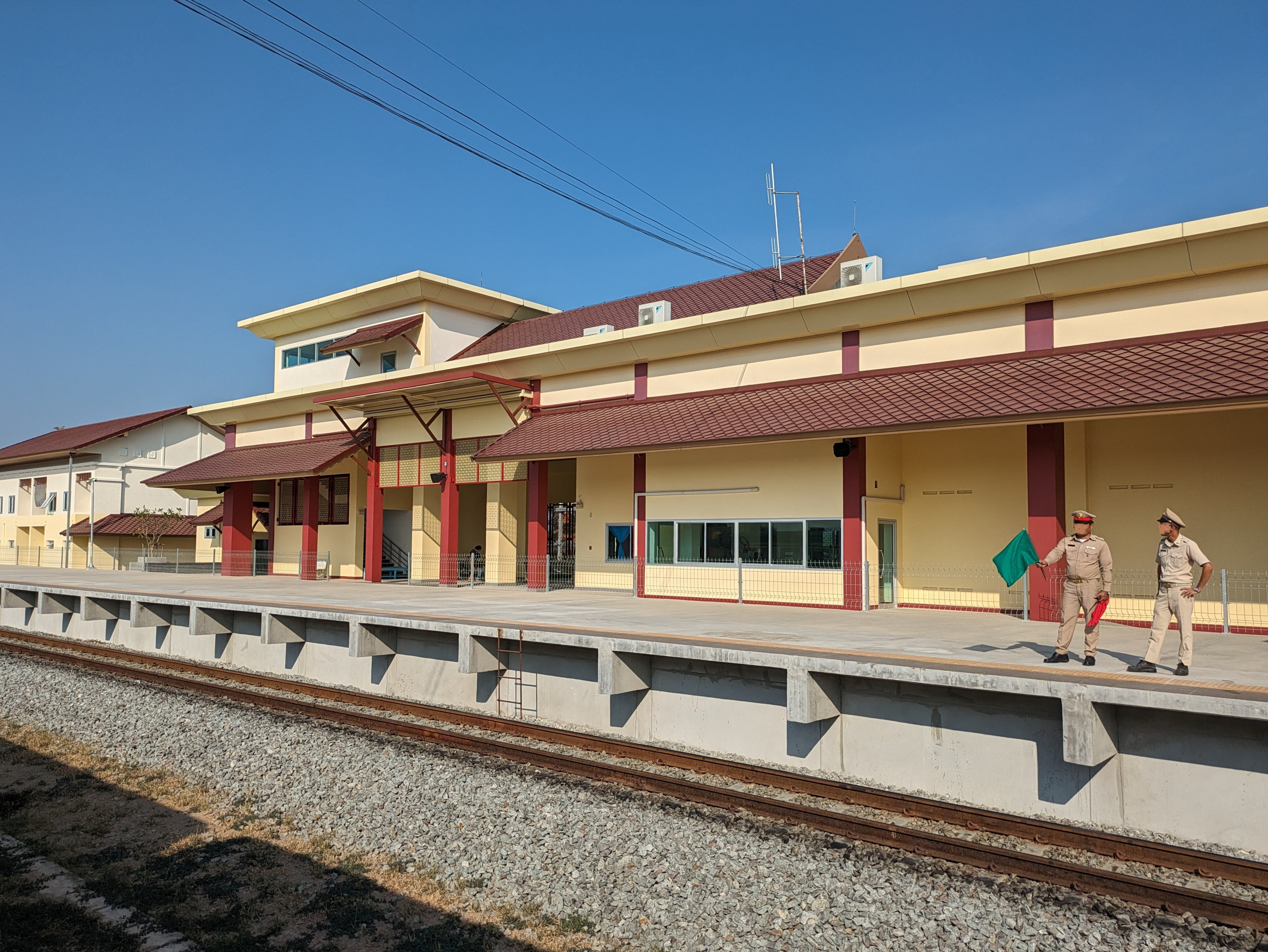
- Station in 2024

General information
- Location: Mu 2 (Ban Nong Sala), Nong Sala Subdistrict, Cha-am District, Phetchaburi
- Owner: State Railway of Thailand
- Line: Southern Line
- Platforms: 2
- Tracks: 2

Other information
- Station code: งา.

History
- Opened: 19 June 1911

Services
Preceding station	State Railway of Thailand	Following station
Nong Chok towards Hua Lamphong or Krung Thep Aphiwat	Southern Line	Cha-am towards Su-ngai Kolok
Location

Nong Sala railway station (Thai: สถานีหนองศาลา) is a railway station located in Nong Sala Subdistrict, Cha-am District, Phetchaburi. It is a class 3 railway station located 175.409 km (109.0 mi) from Thon Buri railway station. The station opened on 19 June 1911 as part of the Southern Line extension from Phetchaburi to Cha-am.

In 2023, the station was rebuilt as part of the double-track section from Nakhon Pathom to Chumphon. The station received a new building and elevated platforms.

== Services ==
- Ordinary 251/252 Thon Buri - Prachuap Khiri Khan - Thon Buri
- Ordinary 254/255 Lang Suan - Thon Buri - Lang Suan
- Ordinary 261/262 Bangkok - Suan Son Pradiphat - Bangkok
