= Khao Thamon railway station =

Railway station in Phetchaburi, Thailand

Coordinates: 13.0403°N 99.9594°E

Khao Thamon เขาทโมน
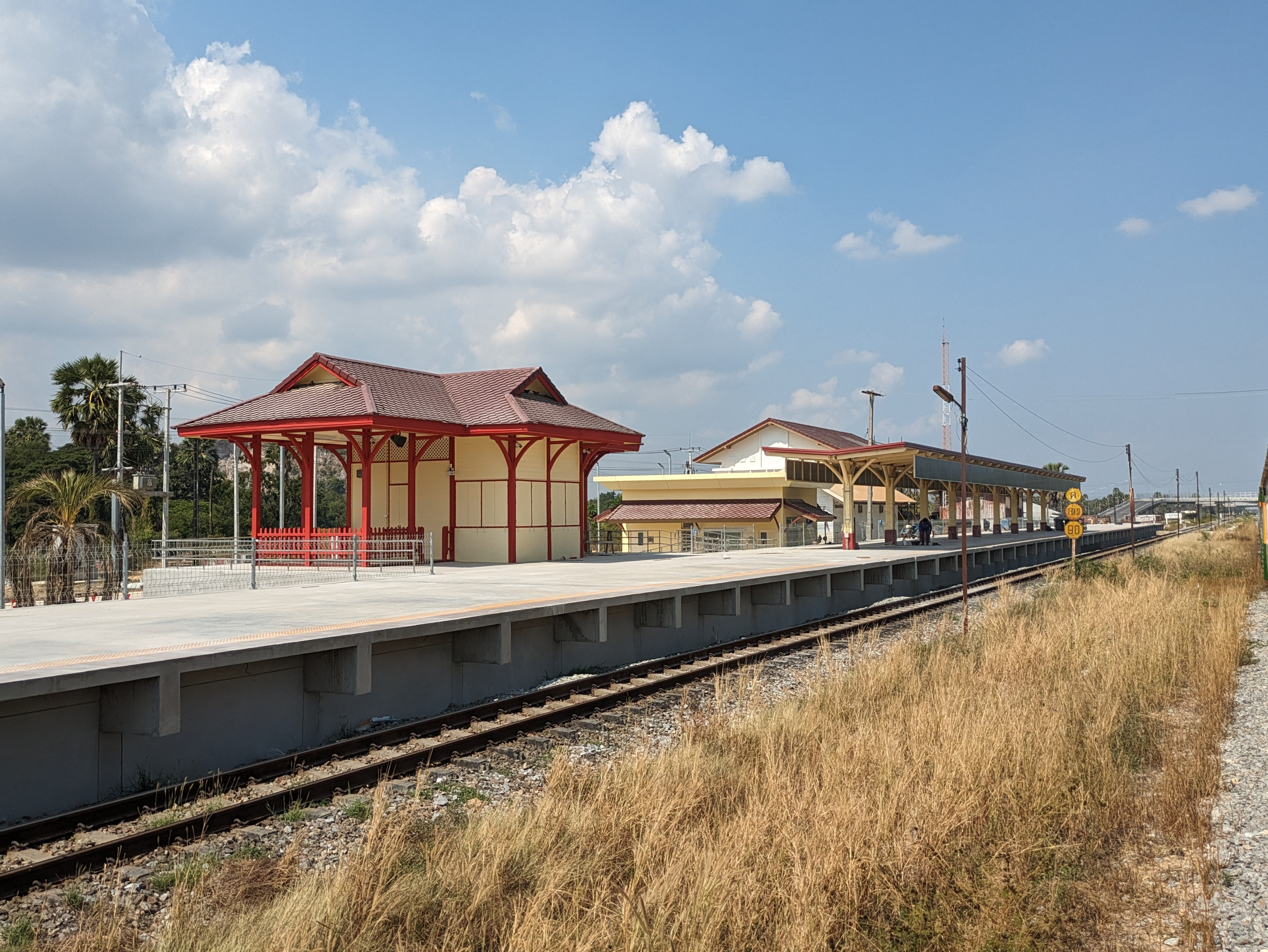
- Station in 2024

General information
- Location: Phetchaburi Local Road No. 2050, Don Yang Subdistrict, Phetchaburi City
- Owner: State Railway of Thailand
- Line: Southern Line
- Platforms: 2
- Tracks: 2

Other information
- Station code: โม.

History
- Opened: 19 June 1911

Services
Preceding station	State Railway of Thailand	Following station
Phetchaburi towards Hua Lamphong or Krung Thep Aphiwat	Southern Line	Nong Mai Luang towards Su-ngai Kolok
Location

Khao Thamon railway station (Thai: สถานีเขาทโมน) is a railway station located in Don Yang Subdistrict, Phetchaburi City, Phetchaburi Province, Thailand. It is a class 3 railway station located 160.322 km (99.6 mi) from Thon Buri railway station.

== History ==
The station opened on 19 June 1911 as part of the Southern Line extension from Phetchaburi to Cha-am. The station's name came from a nearby mountain to the west named Khao Thamon (Mountain of monkeys). There was a branchline to Khao Thamon quarry west of the station, which were later abandoned and dismantled.

The station was renovated in 2023 as part of the double-track section from Nakhon Pathom to Chumphon.

== Services ==
- Ordinary 251/252 Thon Buri - Prachuap Khiri Khan - Thon Buri
- Ordinary 254/255 Lang Suan - Thon Buri - Lang Suan
- Ordinary 261/262 Bangkok - Suan Son Pradiphat - Bangkok

== Gallery ==
Renovated station building

Old station in 2009
