= Khao Yoi railway station =

Railway station in Khao Yoi, Thailand

Khao Yoi เขาย้อย
- Station in 2025

General information
- Location: National Highway No.3172, Mu 5 (Ban Khao Yoi), Khao Yoi Subdistrict, Khao Yoi District, Phetchaburi
- Owner: State Railway of Thailand
- Line: Southern Line
- Platforms: 2
- Tracks: 2

Other information
- Station code: เข.

History
- Former names: Ban Noi

Services
Preceding station	State Railway of Thailand	Following station
Bang Khem towards Hua Lamphong or Krung Thep Aphiwat	Southern Line	Nong Pla Lai towards Su-ngai Kolok
Location

Khao Yoi railway station (Thai: สถานีเขาย้อย) is a railway station located in Khao Yoi Subdistrict, Khao Yoi District, Phetchaburi. It is a class 3 railway station located 133.772 km (83.1 mi) from Thon Buri railway station.

The station opened on 19 June 1903 as part of the first phase of Southern Line from Bangkok Noi to Phetchaburi. It was formerly named Ban Noi before changing to Khao Yoi some time after 1944.

The station was rebuilt in 2023 as part of the double-track section from Nakhon Pathom to Chumphon, receiving a new station building and elevated platforms.

== Services ==
- Ordinary 251/252 Thon Buri - Prachuap Khiri Khan - Thon Buri
- Ordinary 254 Lang Suan - Thon Buri

== Gallery ==
Station in 2021
