= Huai Sai Tai railway station =

Railway station in Cha-am, Thailand

Huai Sai Tai ห้วยทรายใต้
- Station in 2025

General information
- Location: Mu 5 (Ban Huai Sai Tai), Cha-am Subdistrict, Cha-am District, Phetchaburi
- Owner: State Railway of Thailand
- Line: Southern Line
- Platforms: 3
- Tracks: 3

Other information
- Station code: ซใ.

History
- Opened: 25 November 1911
- Former names: Huai Sai

Services
Preceding station	State Railway of Thailand	Following station
Huai Sai Nua towards Hua Lamphong or Krung Thep Aphiwat	Southern Line	Hua Hin towards Su-ngai Kolok
Location

Huai Sai Tai railway station (Thai: สถานีห้วยทรายใต้, lit. 'South Huai Sai') is a railway station located in Cha-am Subdistrict, Cha-am District, Phetchaburi. It is a class 3 railway station located 201.641 km (125.3 mi) from Thon Buri railway station.

== History ==
The station opened on 25 November 1911 as part of the Southern Line extension from Cha-am to Hua Hin. It was simply called Huai Sai before changing to Huai Sai Tai in 1923.

In 2023, the station was rebuilt as part of the double-track section from Nakhon Pathom to Chumphon. The station received a new building and elevated platforms.

== Services ==
- Ordinary 251/252 Thon Buri - Prachuap Khiri Khan - Thon Buri
- Ordinary 254/255 Lang Suan - Thon Buri - Lang Suan
