= Bang Saphan Yai railway station =

Railway station in Thailand

Coordinates: 11.2143°N 99.5098°E

Bang Saphan Yai บางสะพานใหญ่

General information
- Location: Thongkamnoet Road, Kamnoet Nopphakhun Subdistrict, Bang Saphan District, Prachuap Khiri Khan
- Owner: State Railway of Thailand
- Line: Southern Line
- Platforms: 2
- Tracks: 3

Other information
- Station code: พญ.

History
- Opened: March 1915

Services
Preceding station	State Railway of Thailand	Following station
Na Phak Khuang towards Hua Lamphong or Krung Thep Aphiwat	Southern Line	Hin Gong Halt towards Su-ngai Kolok
Location

Bang Saphan Yai station (Thai: สถานีบางสะพานใหญ่) is a railway station located in Kamnoet Nopphakhun Subdistrict, Bang Saphan District, Prachuap Khiri Khan, Thailand. It is a class 1 railway station, located 376.525 km (234.0 mi) from Thon Buri railway station.

The station opened in March 1915 as part of the Ban Krut-Bang Saphan Yai Southern Line Section. The line continued in September 1916 to Chumphon.

== Train services ==
- Special Express 43/44 Bangkok-Surat Thani-Bangkok
- Special Express 35/36 Bangkok-Padang Besar-Bangkok
- Special Express 37/38 Bangkok-Sungai Kolok-Bangkok
- Rapid 171/172 Bangkok-Sungai Kolok-Bangkok
- Rapid 169/170 Bangkok-Yala-Bangkok
- Express 83/84 Bangkok-Trang-Bangkok
- Rapid 173/174 Bangkok-Nakhon Si Thammarat-Bangkok
- Rapid 167/168 Bangkok-Kantang-Bangkok
- Express 85/86 Bangkok-Nakhon Si Thammarat-Bangkok
- Special Express 39/40 Bangkok-Surat Thani-Bangkok
- Special Express 41/42 Bangkok-Yala-Bangkok
- Ordinary 254/255 Lang Suan-Thon Buri-Lang Suan
