= Tha Chalaep railway station =

Railway station in Thammasala, Thailand

Tha Chalaep ท่าแฉลบ
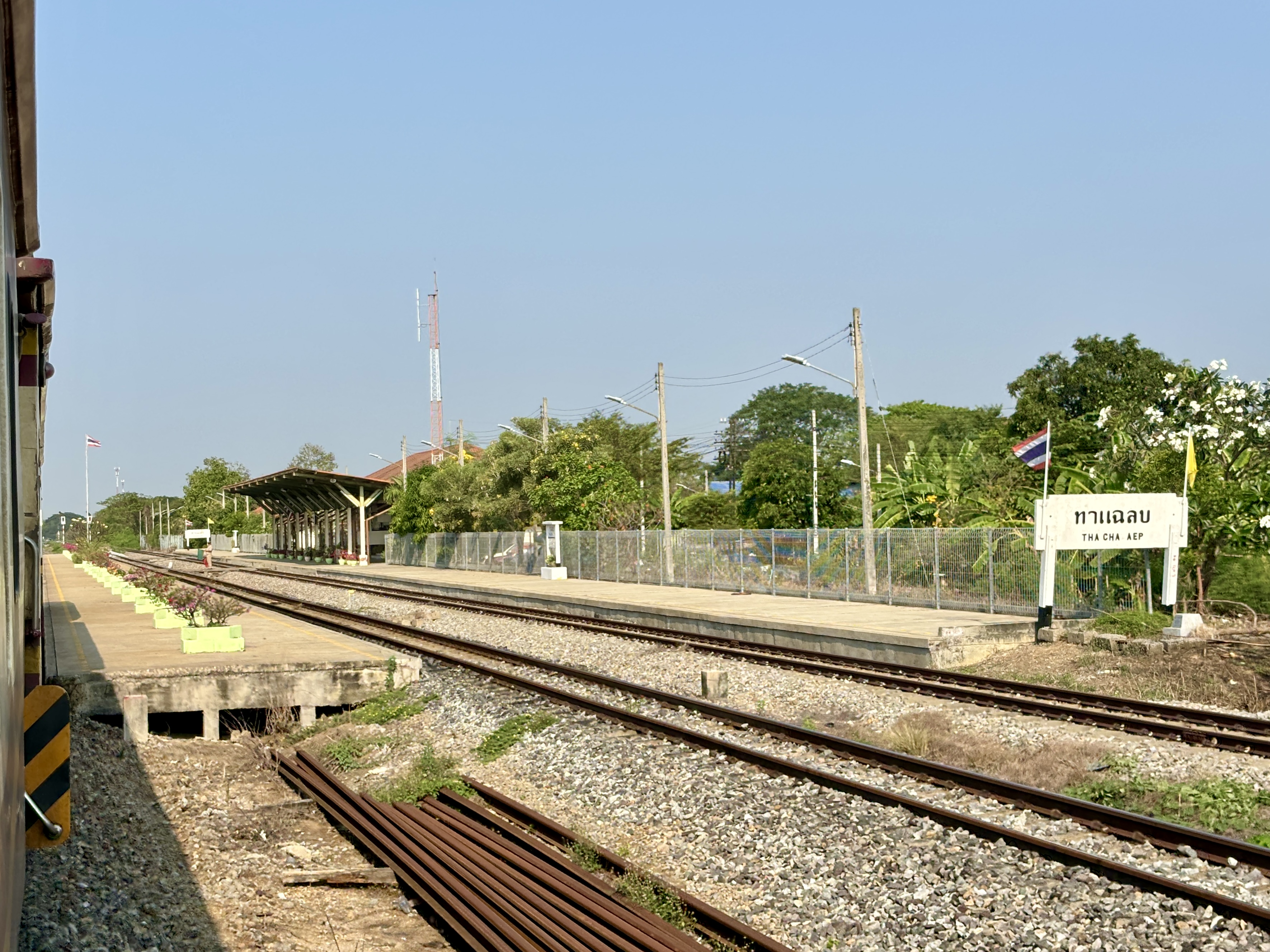

General information
- Location: Sisa Thong Subdistrict, Nakhon Chai Si District, Nakhon Pathom
- Owner: State Railway of Thailand
- Line: Southern Line
- Platforms: 3
- Tracks: 3

Other information
- Station code: ฉล.

History
- Opened: 19 June 1903
- Former names: Ban Tha Chalaep

Services
Preceding station	State Railway of Thailand	Following station
Nakhon Chai Si towards Hua Lamphong or Krung Thep Aphiwat	Southern Line	Ton Samrong towards Su-ngai Kolok
Location

Tha Chalaep railway station is a railway station located in Sisa Thong Subdistrict, Nakhon Chai Si District, Nakhon Pathom. It is a class 3 railway station located 40.025 km (24.9 mi) from Thon Buri railway station.

The station was opened on 19 June 1903 as part of the first Southern Line section from Bangkok Noi to Phetchaburi. It was named Ban Tha Chalaep and was later shortened to Tha Chalaep.

In 2003, the station was relocated to the opposite side of the railway and rebuilt into concrete to make way for the Bang Sue - Nakhon Pathom double-track section.
