= Huai Sai Nua railway station =

Railway station in Cha-am, Thailand

Coordinates: 12.7030°N 99.9503°E

Huai Sai Nua ห้วยทรายเหนือ
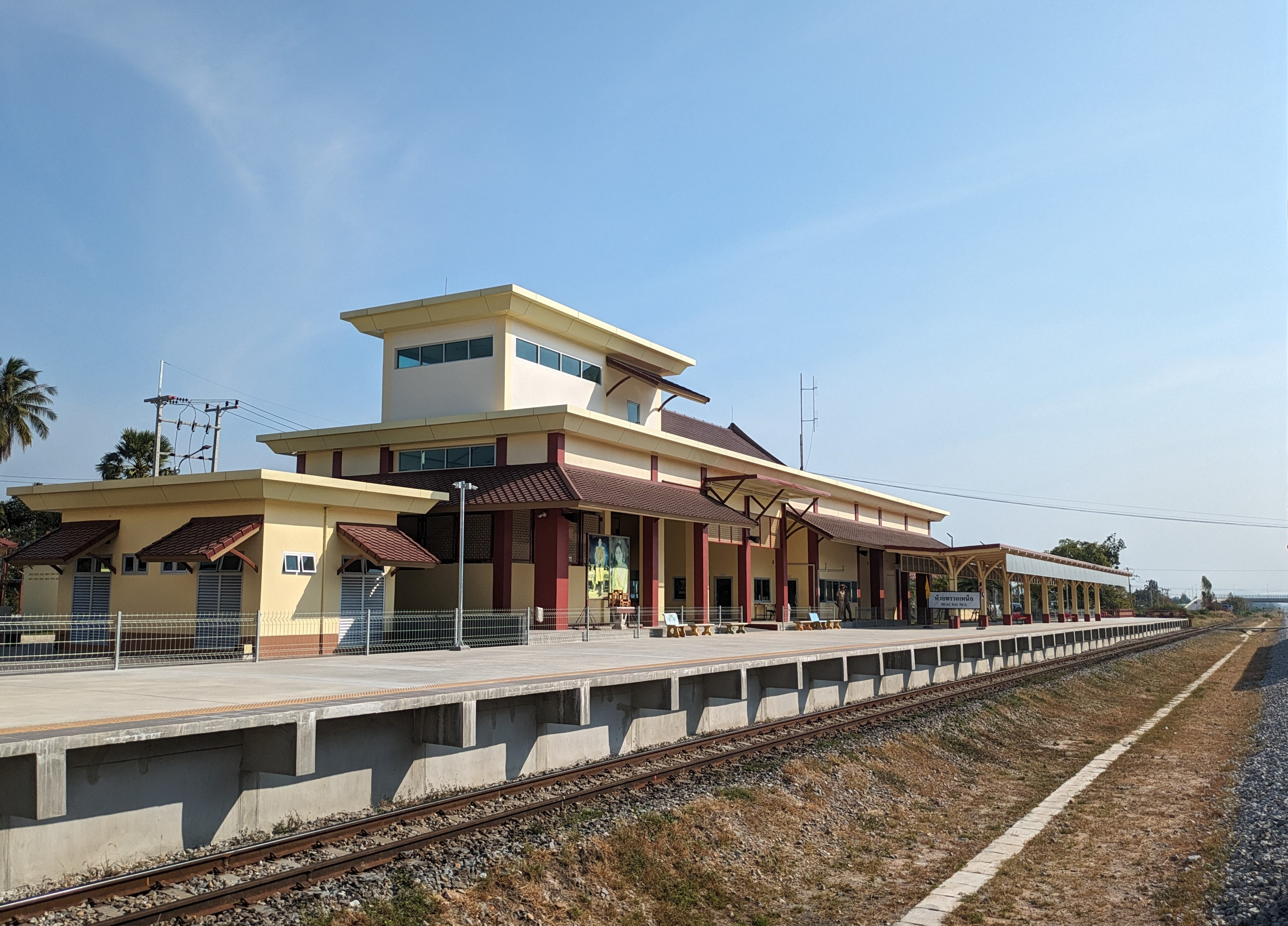
- Station in 2024

General information
- Location: Mu 6 (Ban Huai Sai Nua), Cha-am Subdistrict, Cha-am District, Phetchaburi
- Owner: State Railway of Thailand
- Line: Southern Line
- Platforms: 2
- Tracks: 2

Other information
- Station code: ซน.

History
- Opened: 25 November 1911
- Former names: Bang Khwai

Services
Preceding station	State Railway of Thailand	Following station
Cha-am towards Hua Lamphong or Krung Thep Aphiwat	Southern Line	Huai Sai Tai towards Su-ngai Kolok
Location

Huai Sai Nua railway station (Thai: สถานีห้วยทรายเหนือ, lit. 'North Huai Sai') is a railway station located in Cha-am Subdistrict, Cha-am District, Phetchaburi. It is a class 3 railway station located 197.862 km (122.9 mi) from Thon Buri railway station. It is the nearest station to the Mrigadayavan Palace.

== History ==
The station opened on 25 November 1911 as part of the Southern Line extension from Cha-am to Hua Hin. The station was formerly called Bang Khwai (Thai: บางควาย) before changing to Huai Sai Nua in 1923.

In 2023, the station was rebuilt as part of the double-track section from Nakhon Pathom to Chumphon. The station received a new building and elevated platforms. The old station building was preserved and placed near the new station's entrance.

== Services ==
- Ordinary 251/252 Thon Buri - Prachuap Khiri Khan - Thon Buri
- Ordinary 254/255 Lang Suan - Thon Buri - Lang Suan
