= Nong Pla Lai railway station =

Railway station in Thailand

Coordinates: 13.1899°N 99.8714°E

Nong Pla Lai หนองปลาไหล
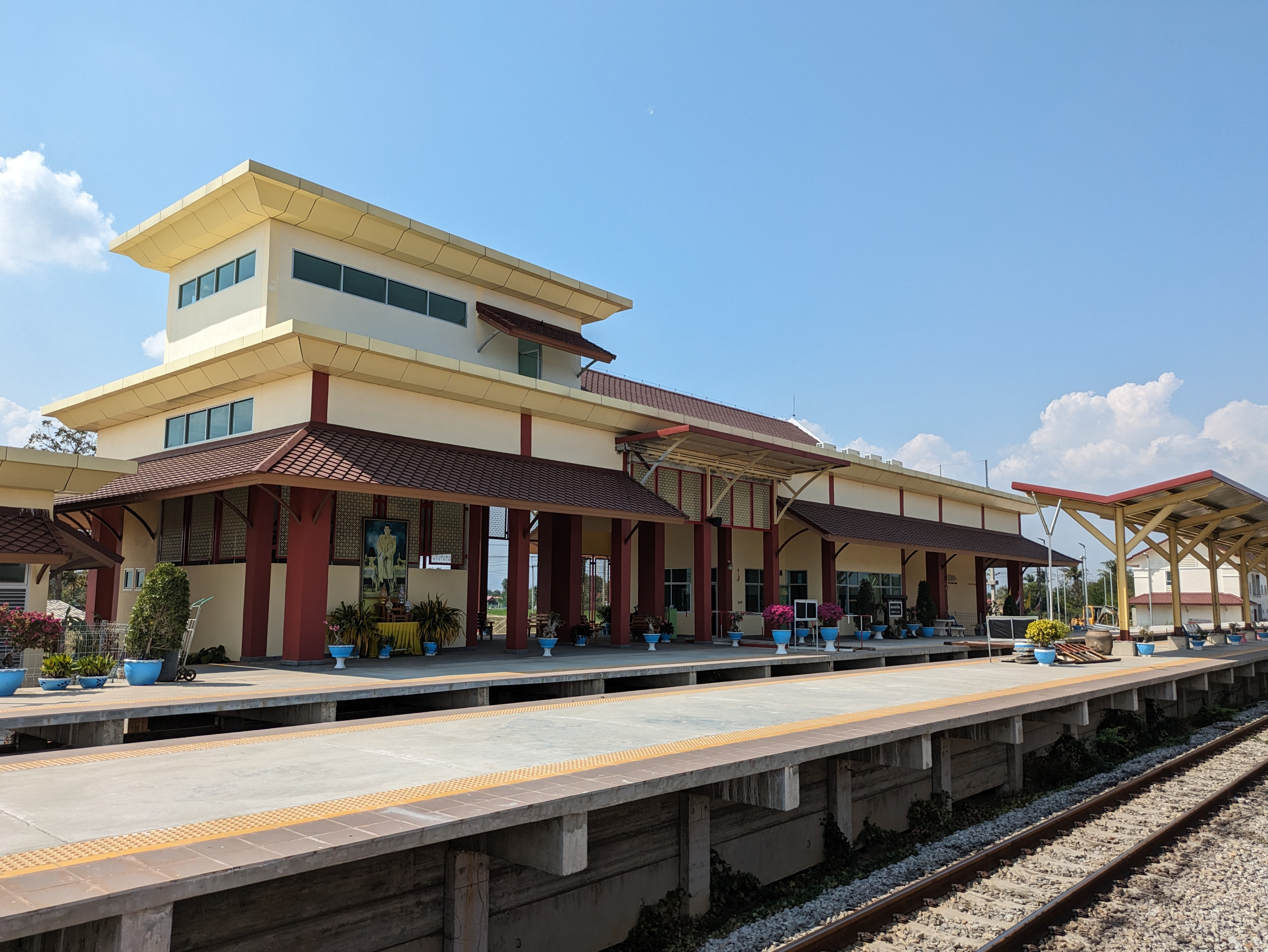
- Station in 2024

General information
- Location: Mu 2 (Ban Nong Pla Lai), Khao Yoi District, Phetchaburi
- Owner: State Railway of Thailand
- Line: Southern Line
- Platforms: 3
- Tracks: 3

Other information
- Station code: ปล.

Services
Preceding station	State Railway of Thailand	Following station
Khao Yoi towards Hua Lamphong or Krung Thep Aphiwat	Southern Line	Bang Chak towards Su-ngai Kolok
Location

Nong Pla Lai railway station (Thai: สถานีหนองปลาไหล) is a railway station located in Nong Pla Lai Subdistrict, Khao Yoi District, Phetchaburi. It is a class 3 railway station located 139.444 km (86.6 mi) from Thon Buri railway station.

In 2024, the station was rebuilt as part of the double-track section from Nakhon Pathom - Chumphon. The new station featured elevated platforms and a new station building.

== Services ==
- Ordinary 251/252 Thon Buri - Prachuap Khiri Khan - Thon Buri
- Ordinary 254 Lang Suan - Thon Buri
- Ordinary 261/262 Bangkok - Suan Son Pradiphat - Bangkok
