= Bang Khem railway station =

Railway station in Thailand

Bang Khem บางเค็ม
- Station in 2025

General information
- Location: Bang Khem Subdistrict, Khao Yoi District, Phetchaburi
- Owner: State Railway of Thailand
- Line: Southern Line
- Platforms: 2
- Tracks: 2

Other information
- Station code: งเ.

History
- Former names: Khlong Pradu

Services
Preceding station	State Railway of Thailand	Following station
Huai Rong Halt towards Hua Lamphong or Krung Thep Aphiwat	Southern Line	Khao Yoi towards Su-ngai Kolok
Location

Bang Khem station (Thai: สถานีบางเค็ม) is a railway station located in Bang Khem Subdistrict, Khao Yoi District, Phetchaburi Province. It is a class 3 railway station located 127.185 km (79.0 mi) from Thon Buri Railway Station. The station building and Platform 1 is located in Khao Yoi District, Petchaburi Province. While Platform 2 is located in Amphawa District, Samut Songkhram Province.

The station opened on 19 June 1903 as part of the first phase of Southern Line from Bangkok Noi to Phetchaburi. It was formerly named Khlong Pradu before changing to Bang Khem some time after 1944.

In 2020, the old station was demolished to make way for the double-track section from Nakhon Pathom to Chumphon. A renovated station building and elevated platforms were later built.

== Services ==
- Ordinary 251/252 Bang Sue Junction-Prachuap Khiri Khan-Bang Sue Junction
- Ordinary 254/255 Lang Suan-Thon Buri-Lang Suan
