= Phrong Maduea railway station =

Railway station in Phrong Maduea, Thailand

Coordinates: 13.8225°N 99.9925°E

Phrong Maduea โพรงมะเดื่อ
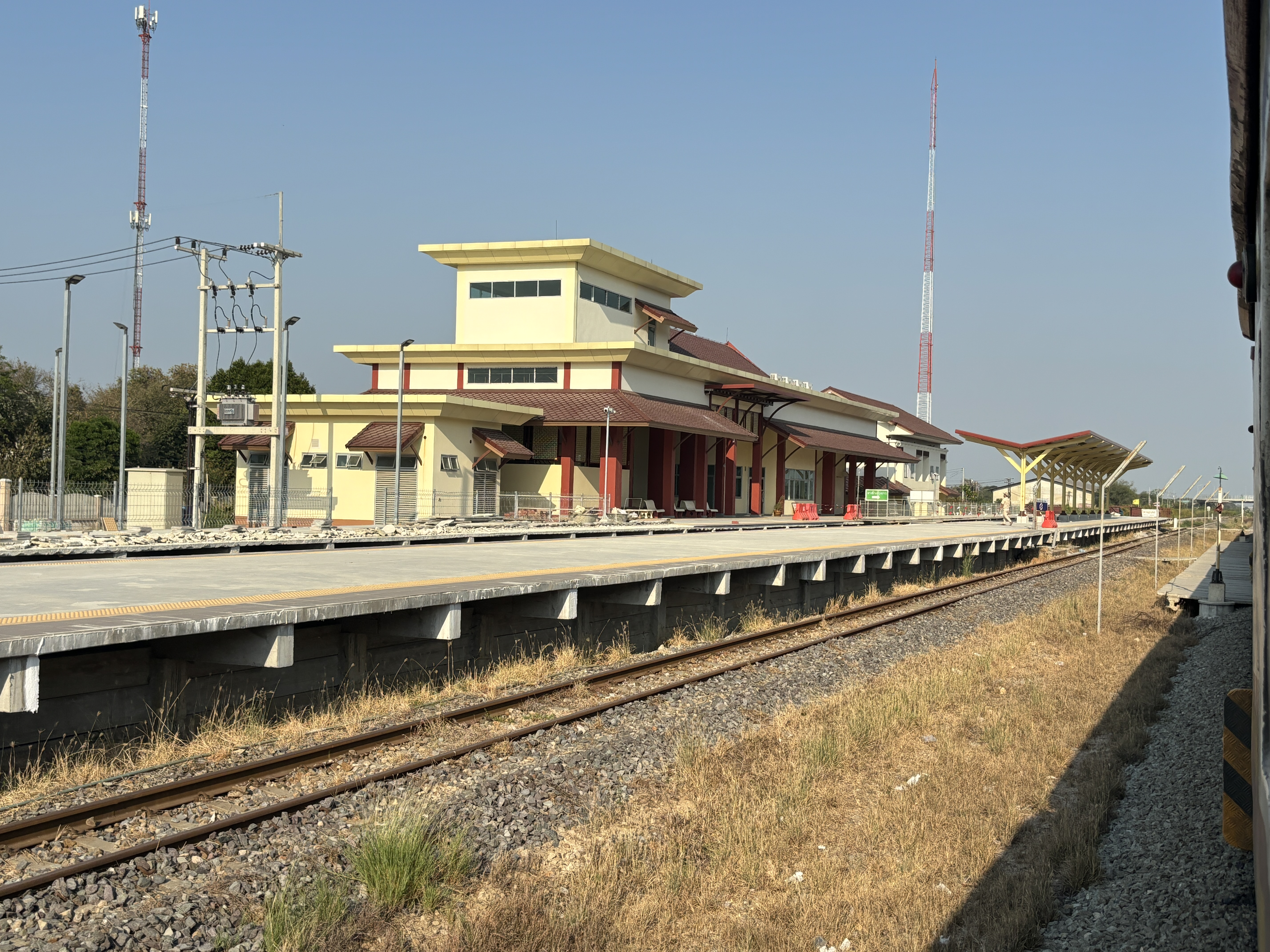

General information
- Location: Phrong Maduea Subdistrict, Nakhon Pathom City
- Owner: State Railway of Thailand
- Line: Southern Line
- Platforms: 3
- Tracks: 3

Other information
- Station code: พด.

Services
Preceding station	State Railway of Thailand	Following station
Sanam Chandra Palace Halt towards Hua Lamphong or Krung Thep Aphiwat	Southern Line	Khlong Bang Tan towards Su-ngai Kolok
Location

Phrong Maduea railway station is a railway station in Phrong Maduea Subdistrict, Nakhon Pathom City, Nakhon Pathom, Thailand. It is a class 3 railway station 55.368 km (34.4 mi) from Thon Buri railway station.

The station was rebuilt as part of the double-track section from Nakhon Pathom - Chumphon, featuring new station building and elevated platforms.
