= Bang Chak railway station =

Railway station in Bang Chak, Thailand

Bang Chak บางจาก
- Station in 2025

General information
- Location: Bang Chak Subdistrict, Phetchaburi City District, Phetchaburi Province
- Coordinates: 13.16°N 99.8994°E
- Owner: State Railway of Thailand
- Line: Southern Line
- Platforms: 2
- Tracks: 2

Other information
- Station code: จก.

History
- Former names: Ban Bang Chak

Services
| Preceding station | State Railway of Thailand | Following station |
|---|---|---|
| Nong Pla Lai towards Hua Lamphong or Krung Thep Aphiwat | Southern Line | Phetchaburi towards Su-ngai Kolok |
Location

Bang Chak railway station (Thai: สถานีบางจาก) is a railway station located in Bang Chak Subdistrict, Phetchaburi City, Phetchaburi. It is a class 3 railway station located 143.901 km (89.4 mi) from Thon Buri Railway Station.

The station opened on 19 June 1903 as part of the first phase of Southern Line from Bangkok Noi to Petchaburi. It was previously named Ban Bang Chak but later shortened to Bang Chak some time after 1929.

In 2022, the station was rebuilt as part of the double-track section from Nakhon Pathom - Chumphon. The new station featured elevated platforms and a renovated station building.

== Services ==
- Ordinary 251/252 Thon Buri - Prachuap Khiri Khan - Thon Buri
- Ordinary 254 Lang Suan - Thon Buri

== Gallery ==
Station building under renovation in 2022
