= Nakhon Chai Si railway station =

Rail station in Thailand

Nakhon Chai Si นครชัยศรี
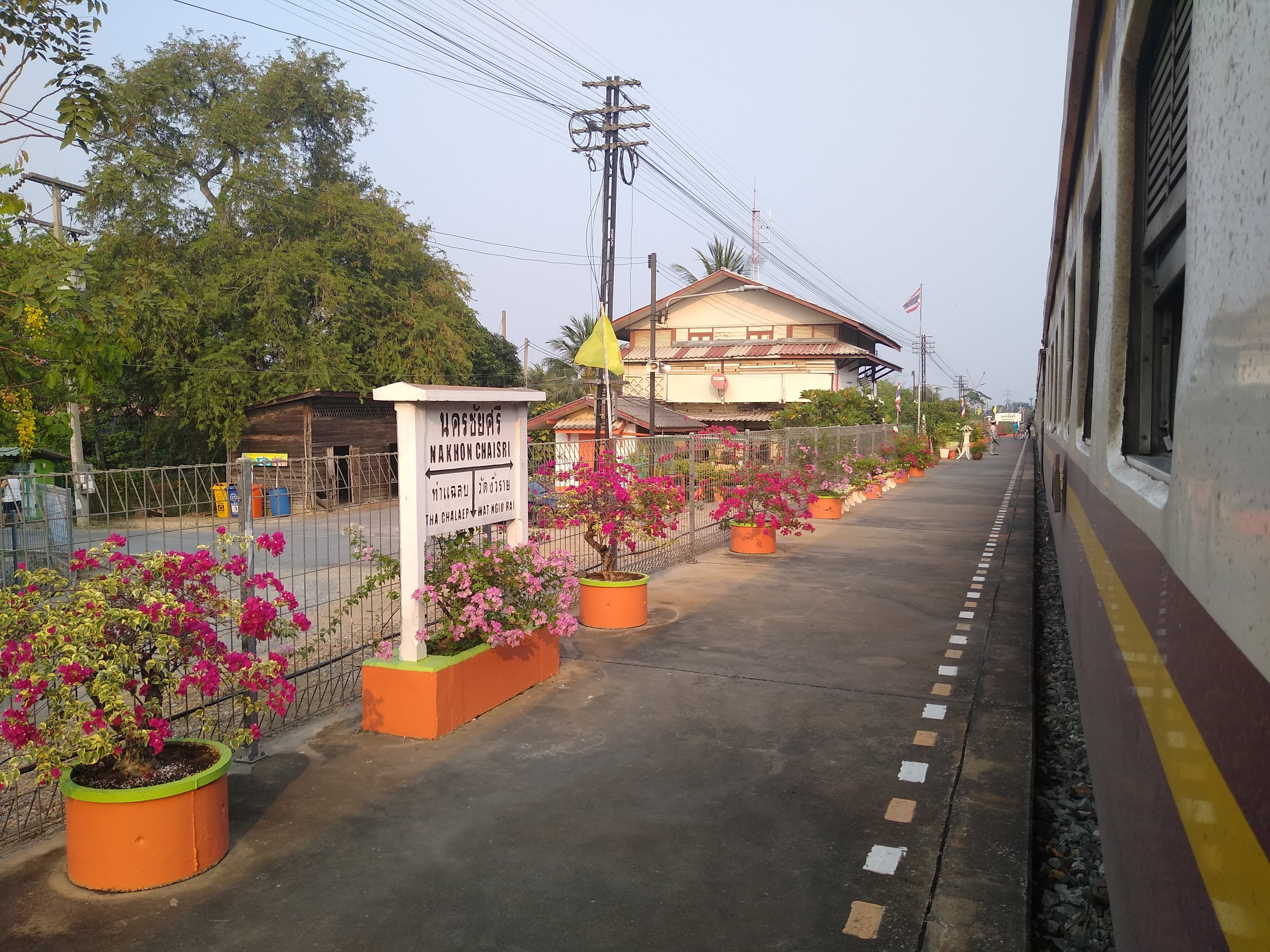

General information
- Location: Soi Sathani Rotfai, Wat Khae Subdistrict, Nakhon Chai Si District; Nakhon Pathom Province; Thailand
- Operator: State Railway of Thailand
- Manager: Ministry of Transport
- Line: Su-ngai Kolok Main Line
- Platforms: 3
- Tracks: 3

Construction
- Structure type: At-grade

Other information
- Classification: Class 2

History
- Opened: 1903
- Former names: Ban Khamehn

Services
Preceding station	State Railway of Thailand	Following station
Wat Ngiu Rai towards Hua Lamphong or Krung Thep Aphiwat	Southern Line	Tha Chalaep towards Su-ngai Kolok
Location

Nakhon Chai Si railway station is a railway station located in Wat Khae Subdistrict, Nakhon Chai Si District, Nakhon Pathom, Thailand. It is a class 2 railway station located 35.134 km (21.8 mi) from Thon Buri railway station.

== History ==
The station opened on 19 June 1903 as part of the first Southern Line section from Bangkok Noi to Phetchaburi. It was previously named Ban Khamehn, named after a nearby village which mostly consisted of Khmer population. The name later changed to Nakhon Chai Si in 1940 to match with the district's name. The station building, built in 1900, is still in-use.

The station is located near Saovabha Bridge, a railway bridge crossing Ta Chin River. The bridge is named after Saovabha Phongsri, the queen consort of King Chulalongkorn. The original bridge was destroyed during World War II but was eventually rebuild and opened in 1949.
