= Ton Samrong railway station =

Railway station in Thammasala, Thailand

Coordinates: 13.8259°N 100.0976°E

Ton Samrong ต้นสำโรง
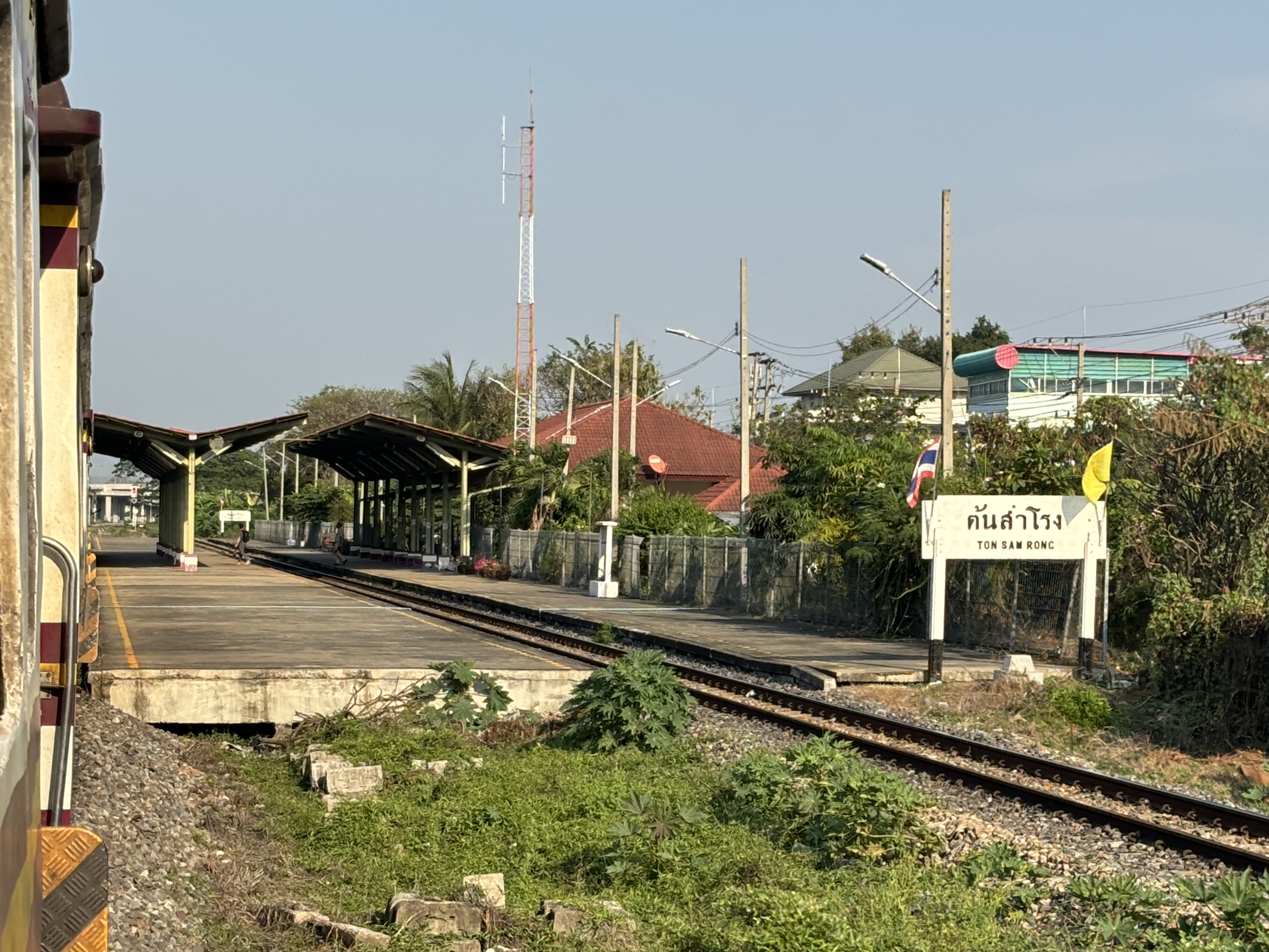

General information
- Location: 25 Makara Road, Thammasala Subdistrict, Nakhon Pathom City
- Owner: State Railway of Thailand
- Line: Southern Line
- Platforms: 2
- Tracks: 3

Other information
- Station code: โร.

Services
Preceding station	State Railway of Thailand	Following station
Tha Chalaep towards Hua Lamphong or Krung Thep Aphiwat	Southern Line	Nakhon Pathom towards Su-ngai Kolok
Location

Ton Samrong railway station is a railway station located in Thammasala Subdistrict, Nakhon Pathom City, Nakhon Pathom. It is a class 3 railway station located 44.301 km (27.5 mi) from Thon Buri railway station. Originally, the station was built 300 metres from the present-day location, near a curve. The station was moved likely because it was difficult to expand the railway station into a railyard, and there was not enough space near a curve for building the double-track section.
