= Na Phak Khuang railway station =

Railway station in Kamnoet Nopphakhun, Thailand

Coordinates: 11.2559°N 99.5311°E

Na Phak Khuang นาผักขวง

General information
- Location: Wutthikon Road, Mu 2 (Ban Na Phak Khuang), Kamnoet Nopphakhun Subdistrict, Bang Saphan District, Prachuap Khiri Khan
- Owner: State Railway of Thailand
- Line: Southern Line
- Platforms: 1
- Tracks: 2

Other information
- Station code: ผข.

Services
Preceding station	State Railway of Thailand	Following station
Nong Mongkhon Halt towards Hua Lamphong or Krung Thep Aphiwat	Southern Line	Bang Saphan Yai towards Su-ngai Kolok
Location

Na Phak Khuang railway station is a railway station located in Kamnoet Nopphakun Subdistrict, Bang Saphan District, Prachuap Khiri Khan in Thailand. It is a class 3 railway station located 371.04 km (230.6 mi) from Thon Buri railway station.

== Train services ==
- Ordinary 254/255 Lang Suan-Thon Buri-Lang Suan
