= Cha Muang railway station =

Railway station in Thailand

Coordinates: 11.1407°N 99.4730°E

Cha Muang ชะม่วง

General information
- Location: Prachuap Khiri Khan Local Road No. 1013, Mu 3 (Ban Cha Muang), Phong Prasat Subdistrict, Bang Saphan District, Prachuap Khiri Khan
- Owner: State Railway of Thailand
- Line: Southern Line
- Platforms: 1
- Tracks: 2

Other information
- Station code: ชว.

Services
Preceding station	State Railway of Thailand	Following station
Hin Gong Halt towards Hua Lamphong or Krung Thep Aphiwat	Southern Line	Bang Saphan Noi towards Su-ngai Kolok
Location

Cha Muang station (Thai: สถานีชะม่วง) is a railway station located in Phong Prasat Subdistrict, Bang Saphan District, Prachuap Khiri Khan, Thailand. It is a class 3 railway station located 385.929 km (239.8 mi) from Thon Buri railway station.

== Train services ==
- Ordinary 254/255 Lang Suan-Thon Buri-Lang Suan
