= Don Sai railway station =

Railway station in Thailand

Coordinates: 11.4569°N 99.6061°E

Don Sai ดอนทราย

General information
- Location: Prachuap Khiri Khan Local Road No.1048, Mu 2 (Ban Don Sai), Na Hu Kwang Subdistrict, Thap Sakae District, Prachuap Khiri Khan
- Owner: State Railway of Thailand
- Line: Southern Line
- Platforms: 1
- Tracks: 2

Other information
- Station code: ดซ.

Services
Preceding station	State Railway of Thailand	Following station
Thap Sakae towards Hua Lamphong or Krung Thep Aphiwat	Southern Line	Khok Ta Hom Halt towards Su-ngai Kolok
Location

Don Sai station (Thai: สถานีดอนทราย) is a railway station located in Na Hu Kwang Subdistrict, Thap Sakae District, Prachuap Khiri Khan. It is a class 3 railway station located 347.007 km (215.6 mi) from Thon Buri railway station.

Due to minimal passenger usage, Don Sai is being converted railway halt and will officially be in operation when the double tracking of the line section is completed.

== Train services ==
- Ordinary 254/255 Lang Suan-Thon Buri-Lang Suan
