= Nong Mongkhon railway halt =

Railway halt in Thong Chai, Thailand

Coordinates: 11.3026°N 99.5440°E

Nong Mongkhon หนองมงคล

General information
- Location: Mu 7 (Ban Nong Mongkhon), Thongchai Subdistrict, Bang Saphan District, Prachuap Khiri Khan
- Owner: State Railway of Thailand
- Line: Southern Line
- Platforms: 1
- Tracks: 1

Other information
- Station code: หน.

Services
Preceding station	State Railway of Thailand	Following station
Ban Krut towards Hua Lamphong or Krung Thep Aphiwat	Southern Line	Na Phak Khuang towards Su-ngai Kolok
Location
- Location within Thailand

Nong Mongkhon Railway Station is a railway station located in Thongchai Subdistrict, Bang Saphan District, Prachuap Khiri Khan. It is located 365.856 km (227.3 mi) from Thon Buri Railway Station.

== Train services ==
- Ordinary 254/255 Lang Suan-Thon Buri-Lang Suan
