= Hin Gong railway halt =

Railway halt in Thailand

Hin Gong หินกอง

General information
- Location: Mu 2 (Ban Hin Gong), Phong Prasat Subdistrict, Bang Saphan District, Prachuap Khiri Khan
- Owner: State Railway of Thailand
- Line: Southern Line
- Platforms: 1
- Tracks: 1

Other information
- Station code: หก.

Services
Preceding station	State Railway of Thailand	Following station
Bang Saphan Yai towards Hua Lamphong or Krung Thep Aphiwat	Southern Line	Cha Muang towards Su-ngai Kolok
Location

Hin Gong Railway Halt is a railway halt located in Phong Prasat Subdistrict, Bang Saphan District, Prachuap Khiri Khan. It is located 383.58 km (238.3 mi) from Thon Buri Railway Station.

== Train services ==
- Ordinary 254/255 Lang Suan-Thon Buri-Lang Suan
