= Khok Ta Hom railway halt =

Railway halt in Thailand

Khok Ta Hom โคกตาหอม

General information
- Location: Mu 9 (Ban Khok Ta Hom), Ang Thong Subdistrict, Thap Sakae District, Prachuap Khiri Khan
- Owner: State Railway of Thailand
- Line: Southern Line
- Platforms: 1
- Tracks: 1

Other information
- Station code: โห.

Services
Preceding station	State Railway of Thailand	Following station
Don Sai towards Hua Lamphong or Krung Thep Aphiwat	Southern Line	Ban Krut towards Su-ngai Kolok
Location

Khok Ta Hom Railway Halt is a railway halt located in Ang Thong Subdistrict, Thap Sakae District, Prachuap Khiri Khan. It is located 353.04 km (219.4 mi) from Thon Buri Railway Station.

Khok Ta Hom is being upgraded to a staffed station, which will begin operation when the double tracking of the line section is completed.

== Train services ==
- Ordinary 254/255 Lang Suan-Thon Buri-Lang Suan
