= Huai Rong railway halt =

Railway stop in Wang Manao, Thailand

Huai Rong ห้วยโรง
- Railway halt in 2025

General information
- Location: Mu 2 (Ban Huai Rong), Wang Manao Subdistrict, Pak Tho District, Ratchaburi
- Coordinates: 13°19′51″N 99°51′7″E
- Owner: State Railway of Thailand
- Line: Southern Line
- Platforms: 1
- Tracks: 2

Other information
- Station code: โง.

Services
Preceding station	State Railway of Thailand	Following station
Pak Tho towards Hua Lamphong or Krung Thep Aphiwat	Southern Line	Bang Khem towards Su-ngai Kolok
Location

Huai Rong Railway Halt is a railway halt located in Wang Manao Subdistrict, Pak Tho District, Ratchaburi. It is located 122.779 km (76.3 mi) from Thon Buri Railway Station.

== Services ==
- Ordinary 251/252 Thon Buri -Prachuap Khiri Khan - Thon Buri
