= Sanam Chandra Palace railway halt =

Railway halt in Phra Pathom Chedi, Thailand

Coordinates: 13.8238°N 100.0410°E

Sanam Chandra Palace พระราชวังสนามจันทร์
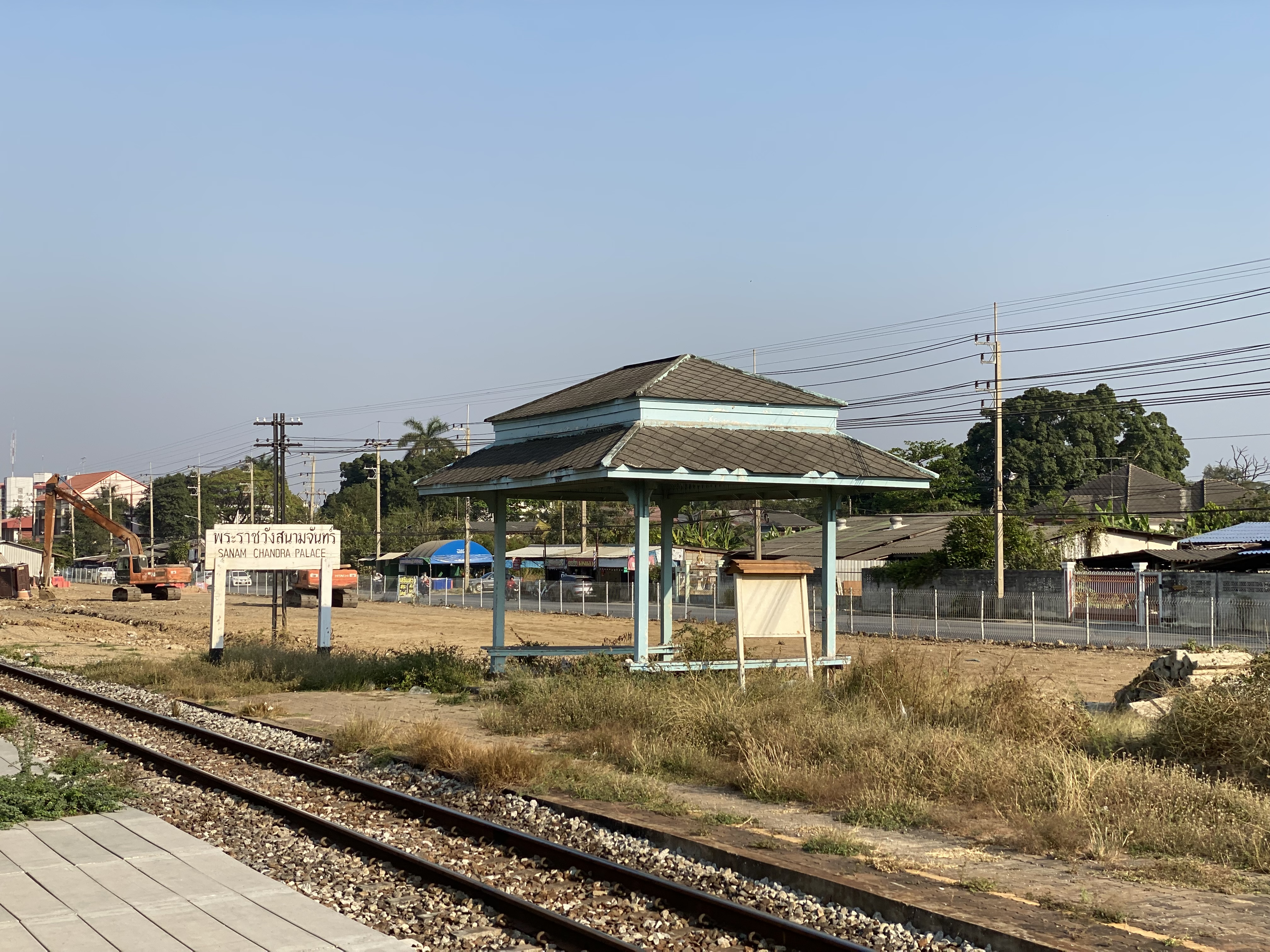

General information
- Location: Nuea Wang Road, Phra Pathom Chedi Subdistrict, Nakhon Pathom City
- Owner: State Railway of Thailand
- Line: Southern Line
- Platforms: 1
- Tracks: 1

Other information
- Station code: สจ.

History
- Former names: Sanam Chandra

Services
| Preceding station | State Railway of Thailand | Following station |
|---|---|---|
| Nakhon Pathom towards Hua Lamphong or Krung Thep Aphiwat | Southern Line | Phrong Maduea towards Su-ngai Kolok |
Location

Sanam Chandra Palace Railway Halt is a railway halt located in Phra Pathom Chedi Subdistrict, Nakhon Pathom City, Nakhon Pathom. It is located 49.798 km (30.9 mi) from Thon Buri Railway Station. It is located near Sanam Chandra Palace, and used to have a royal pavilion, however this was moved to Hua Hin Railway Station.
