= Ban Krut railway station =

Railway station in Thong Chai, Thailand

Coordinates: 11.3491°N 99.5564°E

Ban Krut บ้านกรูด

General information
- Location: National Highway No.3459, Mu 7 (Ban Krut), Thongchai Subdistrict, Bang Saphan District, Prachuap Khiri Khan
- Owner: State Railway of Thailand
- Platforms: 1
- Tracks: 3

Other information
- Station code: กร.

Services
Preceding station	State Railway of Thailand	Following station
Khok Ta Hom Halt towards Hua Lamphong or Krung Thep Aphiwat	Southern Line	Nong Mongkhon Halt towards Su-ngai Kolok
Location

Ban Krut station (Thai: สถานีบ้านกรูด) is a railway station located in Thongchai Subdistrict, Bang Saphan District, Prachuap Khiri Khan. It is a class 3 railway station, located 360.537 km (224.0 mi) from Thon Buri railway station.

== Train services ==
- Special Express No. 43 Bangkok-Surat Thani
- Special Express No. 39/40 Bangkok-Surat Thani-Bangkok
- Special Express No. 41 Bangkok-Yala
- Rapid No. 167 Bangkok-Kantang
- Rapid No. 169 Bangkok-Yala
- Rapid No. 171 Bangkok-Sungai Kolok
- Rapid No. 173/174 Bangkok-Nakhon Si Thammarat-Bangkok
- Ordinary No. 254/255 Lang Suan-Thon Buri-Lang Suan
