= Rantau Panjang railway station =

Railway station in Rantau Panjang, Malaysia

Rantau Panjang

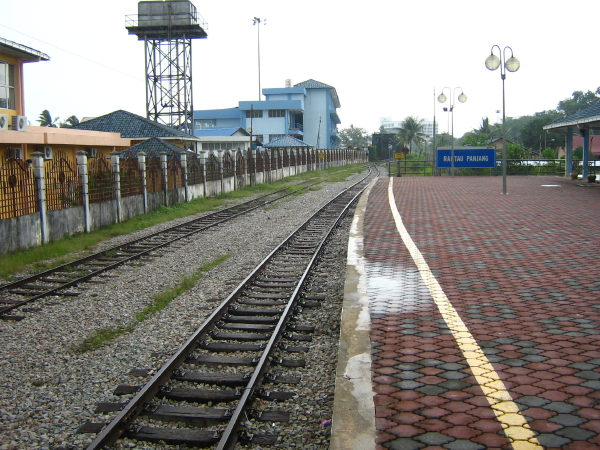
- View of Rantau Panjang railway station's tracks, platform and signboard

General information
- Other names: Malay: رنتاو ڤنجڠ (Jawi); Chinese: 兰斗班让; Tamil: ரந்தாவ் பாஞ்சாங்
- Location: Rantau Panjang, Pasir Mas District; Kelantan; Malaysia
- Coordinates: 6°01′12″N 101°58′33″E
- Owner: Railway Assets Corporation
- Operator: Keretapi Tanah Melayu
- Line: Rantau Panjang Line
- Platforms: 1 side platform
- Tracks: 2

Construction
- Structure type: At-grade

History
- Opened: 1 September 1920 (Federated Malay States Railways); 1 November 1921 (Royal State Railways of Siam)
- Closed: 1982
- Rebuilt: 2026

Former services
Preceding station	Keretapi Tanah Melayu	Following station
Terminus	Rantau Panjang Line	Gual Sitok towards Pasir Mas
Rail connection to Su-ngai Kolok (Thailand) is currently suspended
Location
- Location within Malaysia

The Rantau Panjang railway station was a Malaysian railway station located on the Rantau Panjang branch line, which diverged from the main KTM East Coast Line at Pasir Mas. Situated near Jalan Besar, the station was named after the town of Rantau Panjang in Kelantan. It was one of two rail border crossings between Malaysia and Thailand, the other being Padang Besar railway station in Perlis. However, there are currently no cross-border train services operating at Rantau Panjang. The Thai entrance to the Harmony rail bridge remains sealed by the Royal Thai Army.

== History ==
The station began operations on September 1, 1920, when the railway branch between Rantau Panjang and Pasir Mas was opened. Cross-border services began on November 1, 1921 following the completion of the railway section between Rantau Panjang and Hat Yai, establishing the international rail link between Malaysia and Thailand.

The cross-border services was discontinued in 1978, due to concerns used for smuggling and people trafficking across the border. The station was closed in 1982 following the discontinuation of passenger services.

== Rebuild project ==
On October 29, 2025, the Ministry of Transport of Malaysia, Anthony Loke announced a planned project to rebuild Pasir Mas-Rantau Panjang railway. This project is expected to begin in the year 2026 at a cost of RM264 million.

== See also ==
- Rantau Panjang–Sungai Golok Bridge
- Padang Besar railway station
