= International Express =

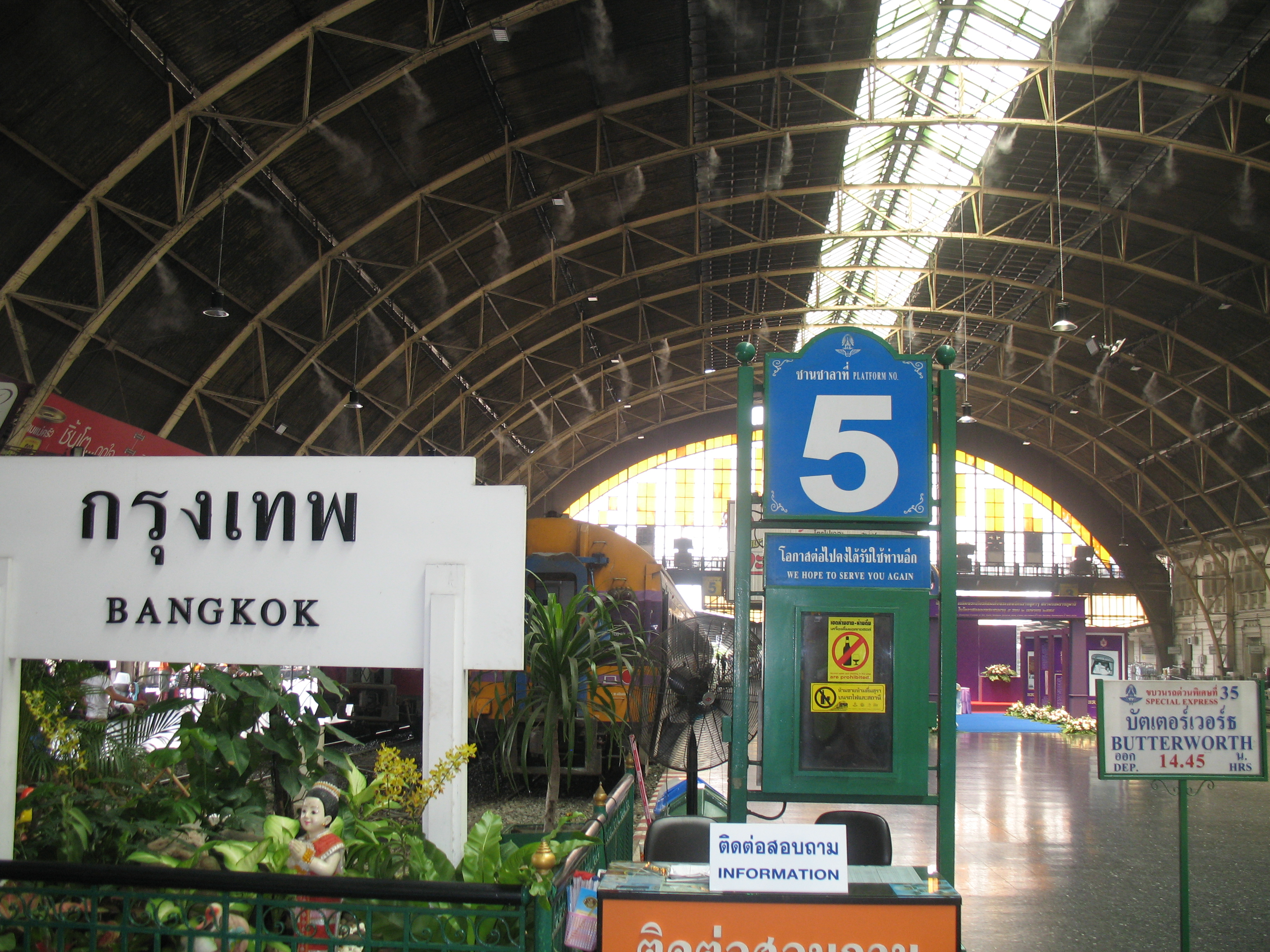
- Platform at Hua Lamphong Station for the Bangkok to Butterworth train

Overview
- Service type: Inter-city rail
- Status: Operational; Ceased (Padang Besar–Butterworth)
- Locale: Thailand–Malaysia
- First service: 2 January 1922; 104 years ago

Route
- Termini: Krung Thep Aphiwat, Bangkok, Thailand; Padang Besar, Malaysia

Technical
- Track gauge: 1,000 mm (3 ft 3 3/8 in) meter gauge

The International Express (Thai: รถด่วนพิเศษระหว่างประเทศ; Malay: Ekspres Antarbangsa) is an express train between Bangkok, Thailand and Padang Besar, Malaysia. The train formerly traveled to Butterworth, Penang.

This train's passenger cars include 2nd-class air conditioned sleepers, and an air conditioned dining car. Diesel electric locomotives such as HID (Hitachi - 2500 HP) and GEA (General Electric - 2500 HP) are used to Haul this express between Padang Besar and Hat Yai.

== History ==
The original name of this train was Southern Express. It was introduced on 2 January 1922 with sleeping cars, double-headed by two E-class locomotives, and ran every Monday (increased to twice a week, Wednesday and Saturday, by 1930) from Bangkok Noi railway station (now Thon Buri railway station). The terminus has changed from Bangkok Noi to Bangkok after the opening of Rama VI Bridge on 1 January 1927. It was a reduced Wednesday-only service from 1940 to 1945.

The service was temporarily suspended from 15 March 1950 to 2 January 1954 due to war damage on the Southern line by bombs from Allied Forces during WWII as well as the insurgencies in southern Thailand and northern Malaya. The destruction of the Rama VI Bridge had compelled State Railway of Thailand (SRT) (replaced Royal State Railways (RSR) from 16 August 1939 to 1945) to use Thon Buri (Bangkok Noi) as the terminal for the International Express and the Hat Yai Express from 2 January 1944.

The Hat Yai Express (Bangkok - Hat Yai) was substituted during the reduction of international service as well as during the suspension of international services even though it was introduced on 3 April 1939 (every Friday) to meet increasing demand from those who lived in southern provinces. The Hat Yai Express was extended to Su-ngai Kolok in January 1942. It was back to Hat Yai after 1945.

The international service was resumed on the old schedule on 2 January 1954 after concluding a cross border treaty between SRT and the Federated Malay States Railways (FMSR).

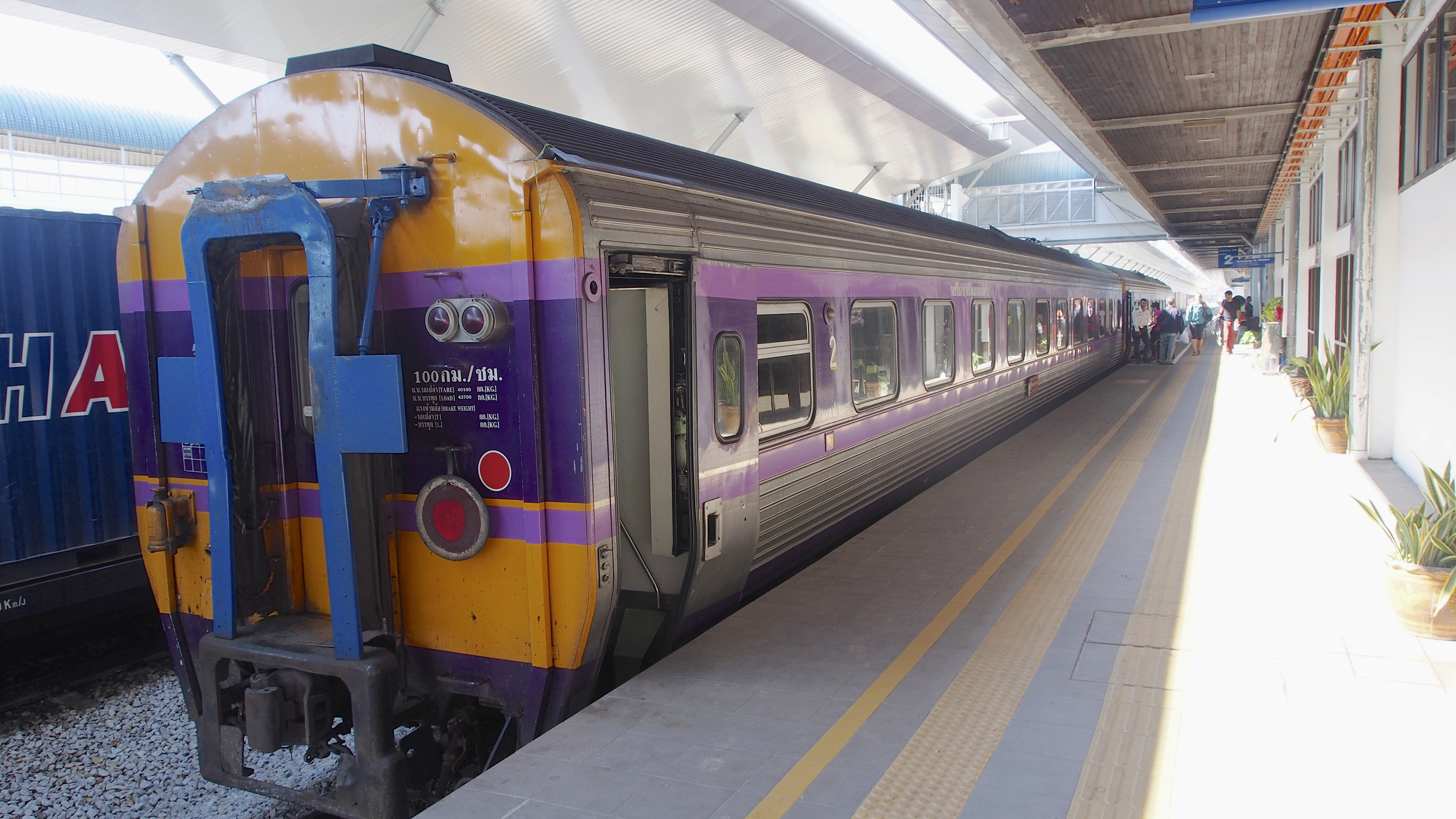
Customs checkpoint, Padang Besar Station

Once there were enough diesel locomotives, the International Express ran daily. From 1966 to 1978 the service ran three times a week between Bangkok and Prai via Padang Besar (extended to Butterworth in 1967), and four times a week between Bangkok and Tumpat via Sungai Golok. After 1978, the International Express ran between Bangkok and Butterworth via Padang Besar only, with the service to Tumpat being truncated to Su-ngai Kolok and rebranded the Thaksin Express.

== Timetable ==
Since 2016, following the opening of the Electric Train Service on the Malaysian side, the International Express is truncated at Padang Besar railway station on the Malaysia–Thailand border; Thai trains no longer travel to Butterworth since then. Passengers are hence required to transfer between the Thai diesel trains and the KTM electric trains at Padang Besar station.

In general trains depart Bangkok (Southbound Train 45) and Padang Besar (Northbound Train 46) daily. The journey takes roughly 18 hours. Between Bangkok and Hat Yai, the train is coupled with Thaksin Express (No. 37 southbound, No. 38 return) - 15 minutes are allocated to couple/decouple the train services at Hat Yai.

== Route ==
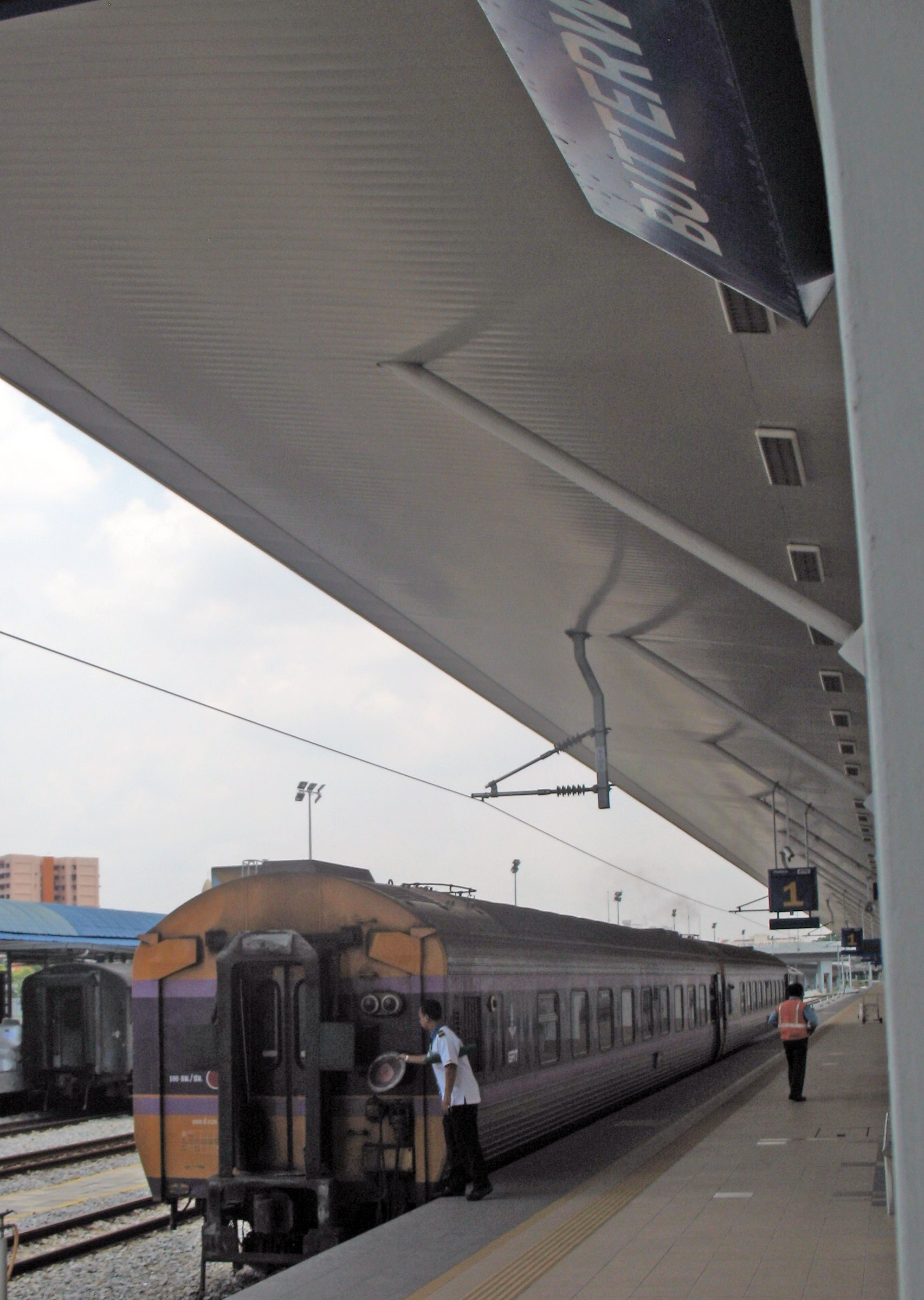
Bangkok to Butterworth train, Butterworth Train Station

The train passes cities and towns along the eastern gulf coast of southern Thailand on the upper Malay Peninsula. These include Nakhon Pathom, Hua Hin, Surat Thani, Hat Yai. The train crosses the Thai-Malaysian border and stop at Padang Besar.
