= Thaksin Express =

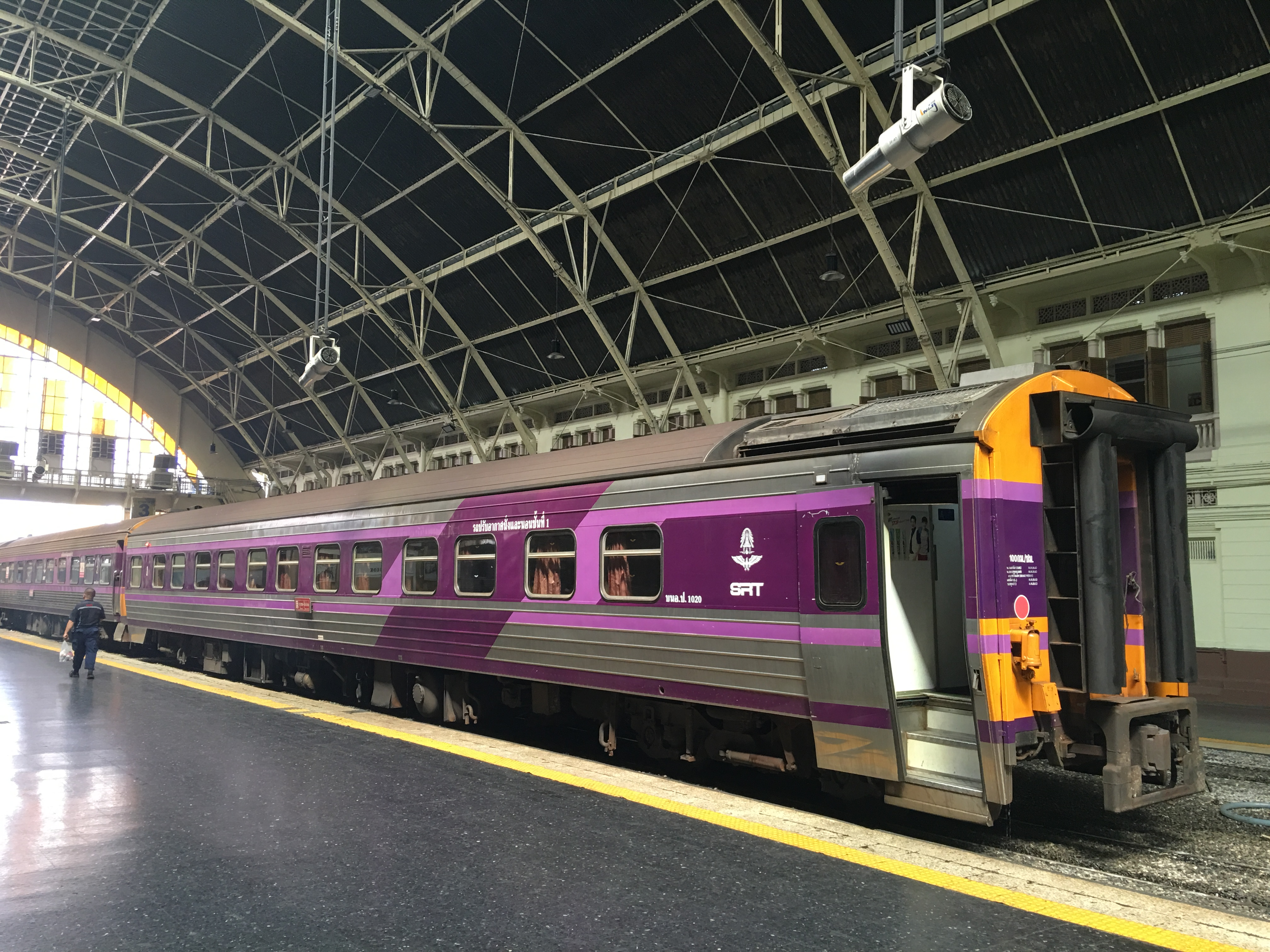

Overview
- Service type: Inter-city rail
- Status: Operational
- Locale: Thailand
- First service: 2 January 1922; 103 years ago (as Southern Express)
- Current operator: State Railway of Thailand

Route
- Termini: Krung Thep Aphiwat; Su-ngai Kolok
- Stops: 26
- Distance travelled: 1,140
- Line used: Su-ngai Kolok Main Line

On-board services
- Classes: First class Second class Third class

Technical
- Track gauge: 1,000 mm (3 ft 3 3/8 in) meter gauge
- Operating speed: 100 km/h (62 mph)

The Thaksin Express (Thai: รถด่วนพิเศษทักษิณ) is an express train run by the State Railway of Thailand (SRT) between Bangkok and Su-ngai Kolok, a border town in Narathiwat Province and the end of the southern rail line. Thaksin is a Thai word for 'south' (from the Sanskrit word dakshin), thus this train is referred to as the "Southern Express". The train's passenger cars include 1st- and 2nd-class air conditioned sleepers, 2nd-class fan sleepers, 2nd-class fan seating coaches, 3rd class air conditioned and fan seating coaches, and a dining car.

== Overview ==
The train passes through cities and towns along the western edge of the gulf coast of southern Thailand on the upper Malay Peninsula. These include Nakhon Pathom, Hua Hin, Surat Thani, Hat Yai, Yala, and Su-ngai Kolok. Although the rail line is connected to the Malaysian rail system towards Rantau Panjang Station, there is no cross-border service on this route.

== Timetable ==
Train Number 37 Bangkok - Su-ngai Kolok (departure times)

- Bangkok (กรุงเทพ) - 15:10
- Sam Sen (สามเสน) - 15:28
- Bang Sue (บางซื่อ) - 15:39
- Bang Bumru (บางบำหรุ) - 15:57
- Salaya (ศาลายา) - 16:14
- Nakhon Pathom (นครปฐม) - 16:42
- Ban Pong (บ้านโป่ง) - 17:00
- Ratchaburi (ราชบุรี) - 17:29
- Phetchaburi (เพชรบุรี) - 18:15
- Hua Hin (หัวหิน) - 19:11 - three minute stop to change crews
- Wang Phong (วังก์พง) - 19:31
- Prachuap Khiri Khan (ประจวบคีรีขันธ์) - 20:28
- Bang Saphan Yai (บางสะพานใหญ่)- 21:38
- Chumphon (ชุมพร) - 23:32 - ten minute stop for refuelling and changing crews
- Surat Thani (สุราษฎร์ธานี) - 01:56 next day - three minute stop to change crews
- Thung Song (ทุ่งสง) - 03:54 - 10 minute stop for refuelling
- Phatthalung (พัทลุง) - 05:37 - three minute stop to change crews
- Bang Kaeo (บางแก้ว) - 06:07
- Hat Yai (หาดใหญ่) - 07:31 - 15 minute stop for uncoupling from No. 45 (to Padang Besar), and refuelling
- Chana (จะนะ) - 08:07
- Pattani (ปัตตานี) - 08:51
- Yala (ยะลา) - 09:28 - three minute stop to change crews
- Rue Sau (รือเสาะ) - 10:03
- Tanyong Mas (ตันหยงมัส) - 10:35
- Sugei Padi (สุไหงปาดี) - 11:02
- Su-ngai Kolok (สุไหงโกลก) - 11:25 arrival

Train Number 38 Su-ngai Kolok - Bangkok (departure times)

- Su-ngai Kolok (สุไหงโกลก) - 14:20
- Sugei Padi (สุไหงปาดี) - 14:36
- Tanyong Mas (ตันหยงมัส) - 15:03
- Rue Sau (รือเสาะ) - 15:34
- Yala (ยะลา) - 16:06 - three minute stop to change crews
- Pattani (ปัตตานี) - 16:37
- Hat Yai (หาดใหญ่) - 18:05 - 20 minute stop for attaching to No. 46 (from Padang Besar), and refuelling
- Bang Kaeo (บางแก้ว) - 19:06
- Phatthalung (พัทลุง) - 19:34 - three minute stop to change crews
- Thung Song (ทุ่งสง) - 21:19 - 15 minute stop for refuelling and changing crews
- Surat Thani (สุราษฎร์ธานี) - 23:00 - three minute stop for changing crews
- Chumphon (ชุมพร) - 01:36 (next day) - 10 minute stop for refuelling and changing crews
- Bang Saphan Yai (บางสะพานใหญ่)- 03:08
- Prachuap Khiri Khan (ประจวบคีรีขันธ์) - 04:17
- Hua Hin (หัวหิน) - 05:34 - three minute stop to change crews
- Ratchaburi (ราชบุรี) - 07:26
- Ban Pong (บ้านโป่ง) - 07:58
- Nakhon Pathom (นครปฐม) - 08:21
- Salaya (ศาลายา) - 09:05
- Bang Bumru (บางบำหรุ) - 09:32
- Bang Sue (บางซื่อ) - 09:54
- Sam Sen (สามเสน) - 10:05
- Bangkok (กรุงเทพ) - 10:30 arrival

== Current status ==
There are about 3-4 second class rakes plus one first class rake for the train between Hat Yai-Su-ngai Kolok.

For the local people in the southern provinces, the Southern Special Express 37/38 serves as a means of reassurance that the central government will not abandon the local people of the three southern provinces despite the ongoing insurgencies there.
