= Cha-am railway station =

Railway station in Thailand

Cha-am ชะอำ
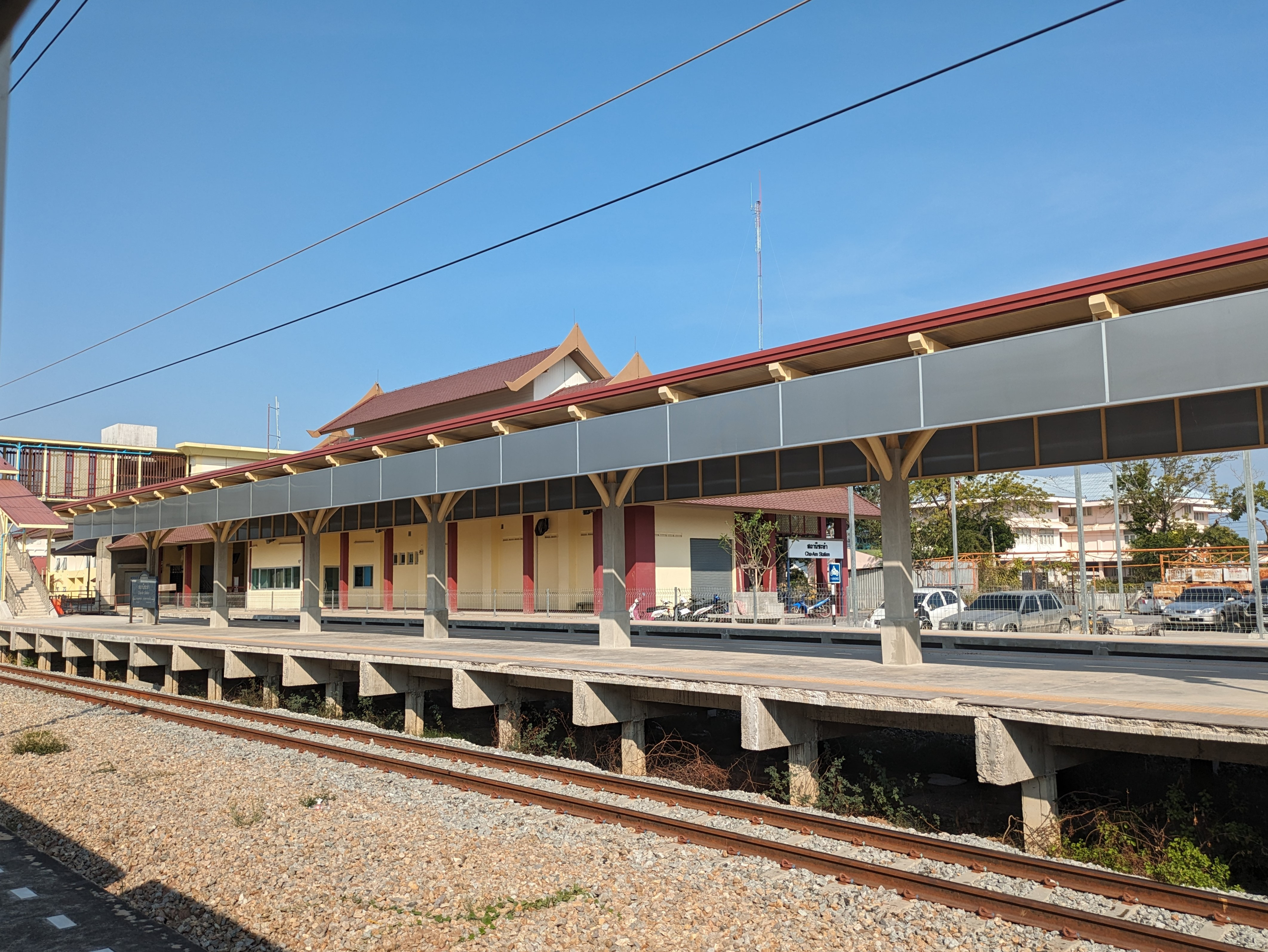
- Station in 2024

General information
- Location: Narathip Road, Cha-am Subdistrict, Cha-am District, Phetchaburi
- Owner: State Railway of Thailand
- Line: Southern Line
- Platforms: 3
- Tracks: 3

Other information
- Station code: ชอ.

History
- Opened: June 19, 1911; 115 years ago
- Former names: Ban Cha-am

Services
Preceding station	State Railway of Thailand	Following station
Nong Sala towards Hua Lamphong or Krung Thep Aphiwat	Southern Line	Huai Sai Nua towards Su-ngai Kolok
Location

Cha-am railway station (Thai: สถานีชะอำ) is a railway station located in Cha-am Subdistrict, Cha-am District, Phetchaburi. It is a class 2 railway station located 187.066 km (116.2 mi) from Thon Buri railway station. The station is about 2 km (1.2 mi) from Cha-am beach, with a motorbike taxi service.

== History ==
The station opened on 19 June 1911, as a terminus of the Southern Line extension from Phetchaburi. The line later extended to Hua Hin in the same year on November 25th. Originally, the station was called Ban Cha-am, but was shortened to Cha-am in 2009.

In 2022, the station was rebuilt and relocated to the opposite side of original site (next to the district office). The station received a new building, elevated platforms and a footbridge.

== Train services ==
- Rapid 169/170 Krung Thep Aphiwat - Yala - Krung Thep Aphiwat
- Ordinary 261/262 Bangkok - Suan Son Pradiphat - Bangkok
- Ordinary 251/252 Thon Buri - Prachuap Khiri Khan - Thon Buri
- Ordinary 254/255 Lang Suan - Thon Buri - Lang Suan
- Excursion 911/912 Bangkok - Suan Son Pradiphat - Bangkok

== Gallery ==
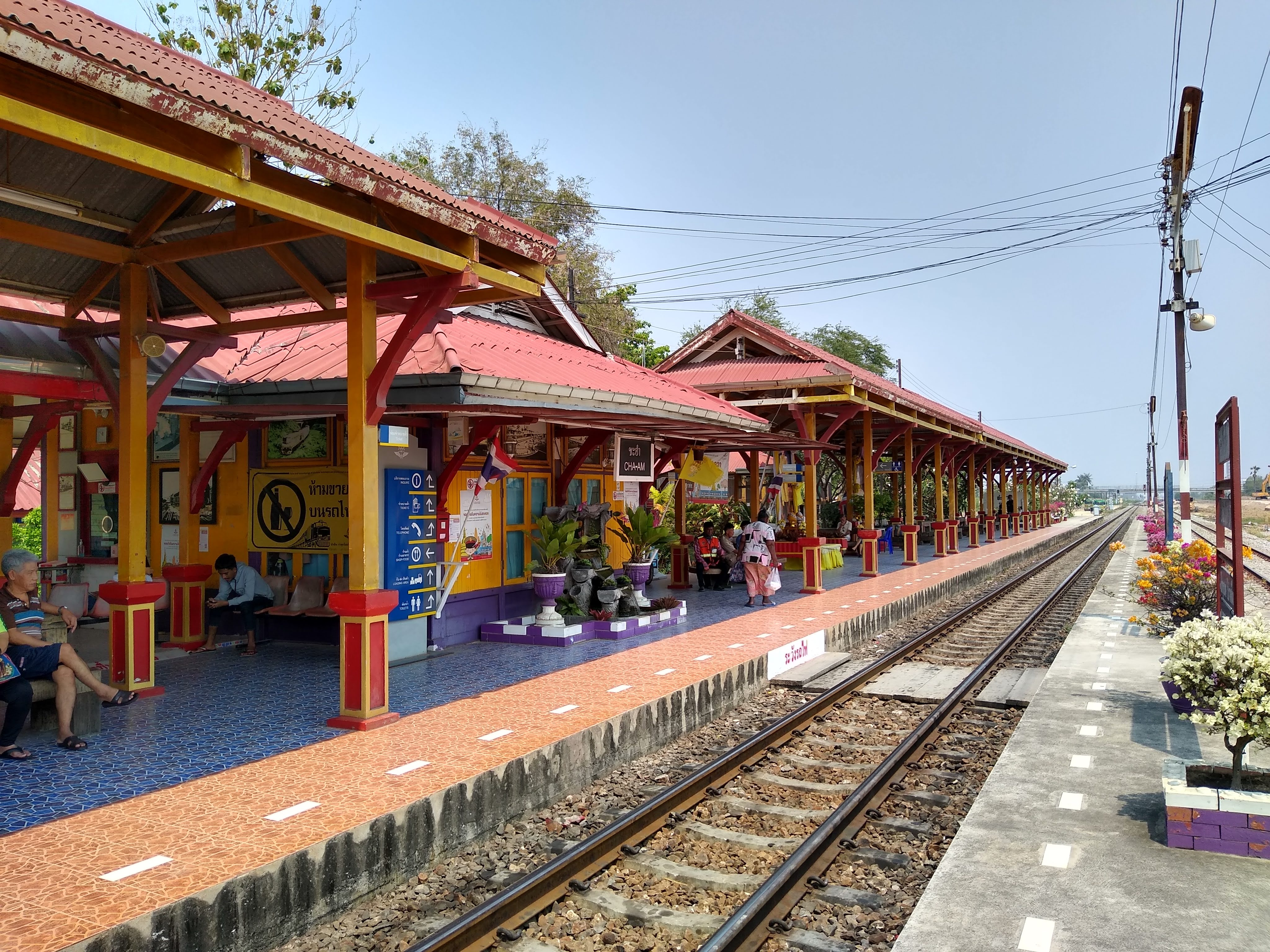
Old station in 2020

Station sign in 2009. The word "Ban" had recently been removed.
