= Phetchaburi railway station =

Railway station in Thailand

Phetchaburi เพชรบุรี
- Phetchaburi Railway Station in 2026

General information
- Location: Rotfai Road, Khlong Krachaeng Subdistrict, Phetchaburi City
- Owner: State Railway of Thailand
- Line: Southern Line
- Platforms: 3
- Tracks: 4

Other information
- Station code: พบ.

History
- Opened: June 1903
- Rebuilt: 2024

Services
Preceding station	State Railway of Thailand	Following station
Bang Chak towards Hua Lamphong or Krung Thep Aphiwat	Southern Line	Khao Thamon towards Su-ngai Kolok
Location

Phetchaburi railway station (Thai: สถานีเพชรบุรี) is a railway station located in Khlong Krachaeng Subdistrict, Phetchaburi City, 150.49 km (93.5 mi) from Thon Buri railway station. It is a class 1 railway station and the main railway station of Phetchaburi Province.

== History ==
The station opened in June 1903 during the reign of King Chulalongkorn, along with the first phase of the Southern Line from Thon Buri Station to Phetchaburi Station. At the time, the railway route was called "The Phetchaburi Railway Route". The original station was situated near Phetchaburi River before moving to the current spot in 1911, when the line was extended to Cha-am Station and then southwards to Sungai Kolok and Padang Besar during King Vajiravudh's reign.

Phetchaburi station was rebuilt during the double-track construction from Nakhon Pathom to Chumphon. A new station building was built next to the original station, along with elevated platforms and a footbridge.

== Train services ==
- Thaksinarath Express 31/32 Krung Thep Aphiwat - Hat Yai Junction - Krung Thep Aphiwat
- Thaksin Express 37/38 Krung Thep Aphiwat - Su-ngai Kolok - Krung Thep Aphiwat
- Special Express 39/40 Krung Thep Aphiwat - Surat Thani - Krung Thep Aphiwat
- Special Express 41/42 Krung Thep Aphiwat - Yala - Krung Thep Aphiwat (suspended due to COVID-19 pandemic)
- Special Express 43/44 Krung Thep Aphiwat - Surat Thani - Krung Thep Aphiwat
- International Express 45/46 Krung Thep Aphiwat - Padang Besar - Krung Thep Aphiwat (coupled with Thaksin Express 37/38)
- Express 83/84 Krung Thep Aphiwat - Trang - Krung Thep Aphiwat
- Express 85/86 Krung Thep Aphiwat - Nakhon Si Thammarat - Krung Thep Aphiwat
- Rapid 167/168 Krung Thep Aphiwat - Kantang - Krung Thep Aphiwat
- Rapid 169/170 Krung Thep Aphiwat - Yala - Krung Thep Aphiwat
- Rapid 171/172 Krung Thep Aphiwat - Su-ngai Kolok - Krung Thep Aphiwat
- Rapid 173/174 Krung Thep Aphiwat - Nakhon Si Thammarat - Krung Thep Aphiwat.
- Ordinary 261/262 Bangkok (Hua Lamphong) - Suan Son Pradiphat - Bangkok (Hua Lamphong)
- Ordinary 251/252 Thon Buri - Prachuap Khiri Khan - Thon Buri
- Ordinary 254/255 Lang Suan - Thon Buri - Lang Suan

== Gallery ==
The old Phetchaburi station in 2021

Old station in 2026. Now with platform roof removed.

Station Signalbox (now abandoned)
