= Nakhon Pathom railway station =

Railway station in Thailand

Coordinates: 13.8243°N 100.0593°E

Nakhon Pathom นครปฐม
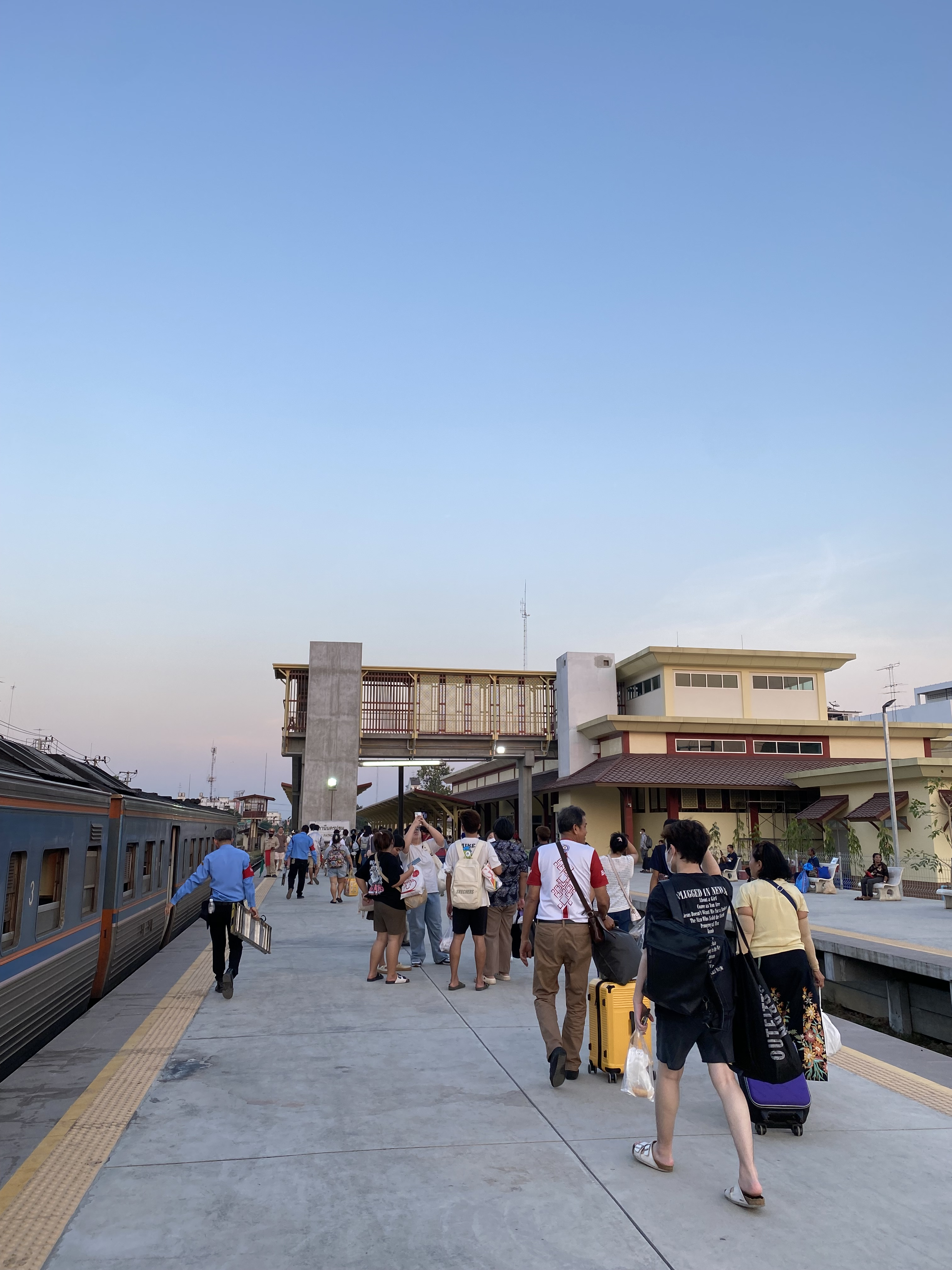
- Nakhon Pathom Railway Station in 2025

General information
- Location: Lang Sathani Rotfai Road, Phra Pathom Chedi subdistrict, Mueang Nakhon Pathom district, Nakhon Pathom
- Owner: State Railway of Thailand
- Line: Southern Line
- Platforms: 2
- Tracks: 4

Other information
- Station code: คฐ.

History
- Opened: June 1903
- Former names: Phra Pathom

Services
Preceding station	State Railway of Thailand	Following station
Ton Samrong towards Hua Lamphong or Krung Thep Aphiwat	Southern Line	Sanam Chandra Palace Halt towards Su-ngai Kolok
Location

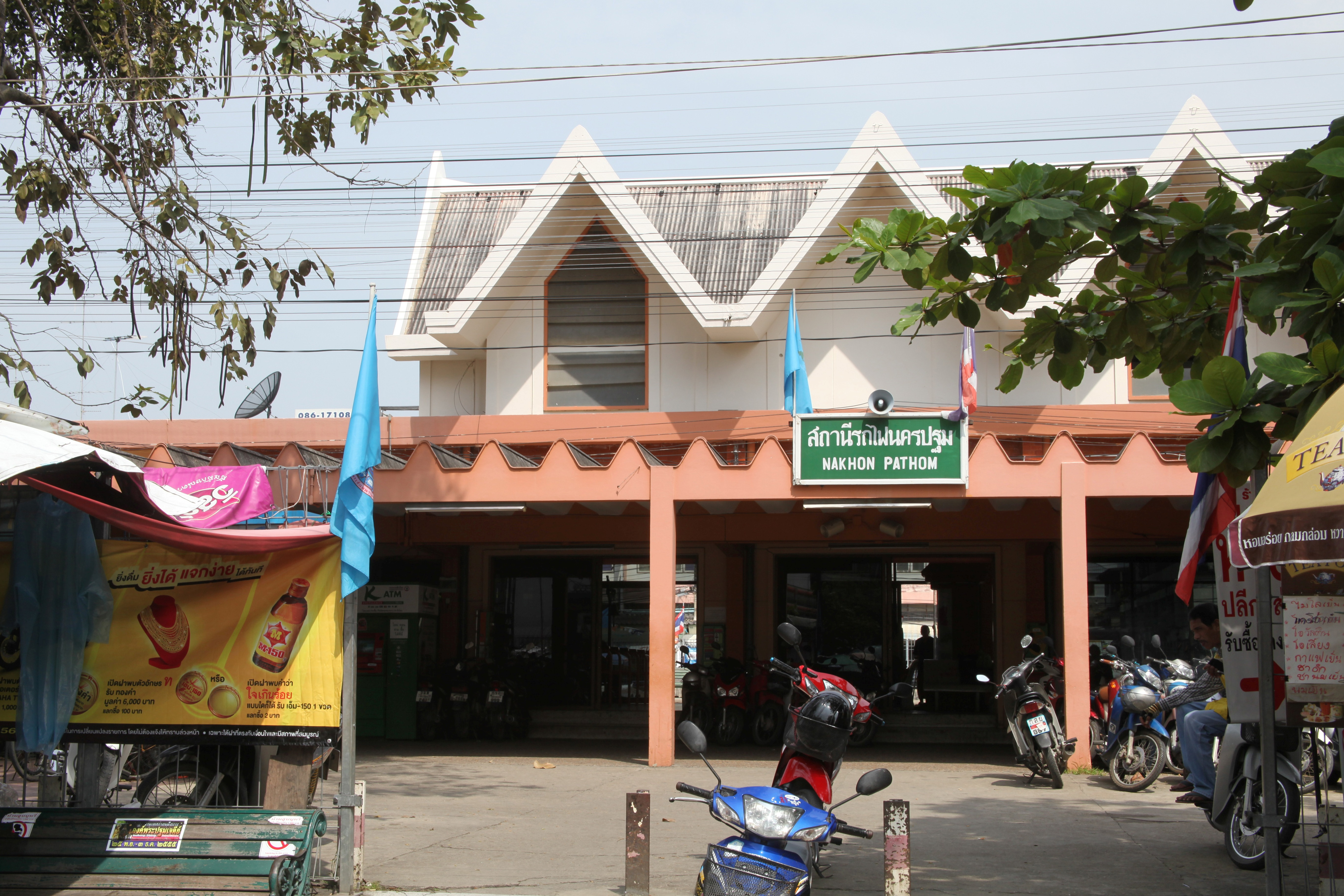
The old station

Nakhon Pathom railway station is a railway station located in Phra Pathom Chedi subdistrict, Mueang Nakhon Pathom district, and is located 48.126 km (29.9 mi) from Thon Buri railway station. It is a class 1 railway station and is the main railway station of Nakhon Pathom province. The station is not far from Phra Pathom Chedi which is a famous landmark of the province. The station opened in June 1903 as part of the first phase of the Southern Line construction between Thon Buri Station to Phetchaburi Station and was originally named "Phra Pathom" station.

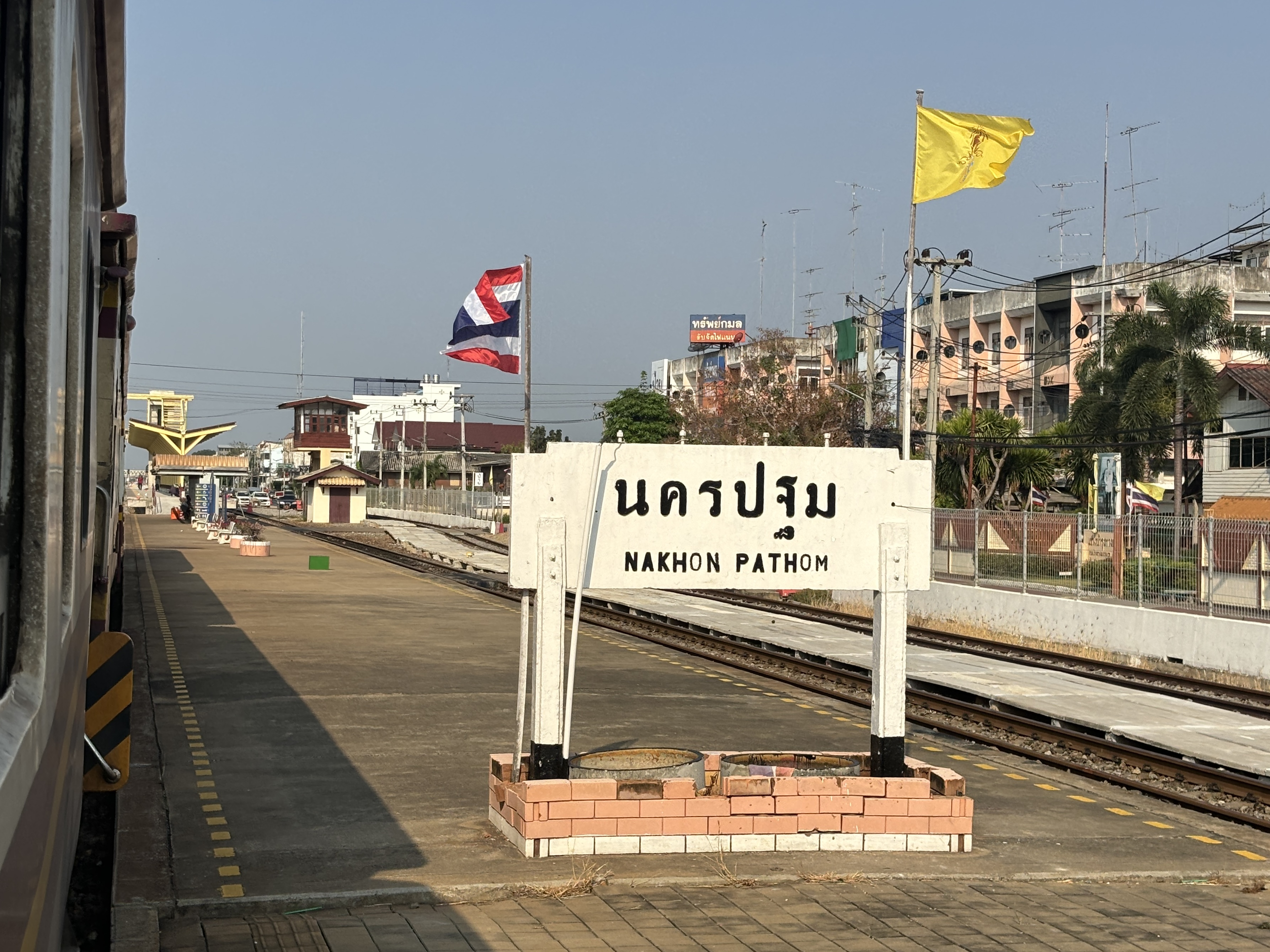
The old platforms and sign

During the 2011 Thailand floods, Nakhon Pathom Station was the terminus for most train services instead of Bangkok railway station as some sections between Nakhon Pathom and Bangkok were flooded. The station is the terminus of the Thon Buri - Nakhon Pathom SRT Light Red Line feeder services.

Until 2024, Nakhon Pathom station was formerly the end of double-track section from Bang Sue Junction. The section now continues to Chumphon, in which Nakhon Pathom station received a rebuild. The current station was moved further to the west and all platforms are elevated.
