= Chumphon railway station =

Railway station in Thailand

Coordinates: 10.5030°N 99.1759°E

Chumphon ชุมพร
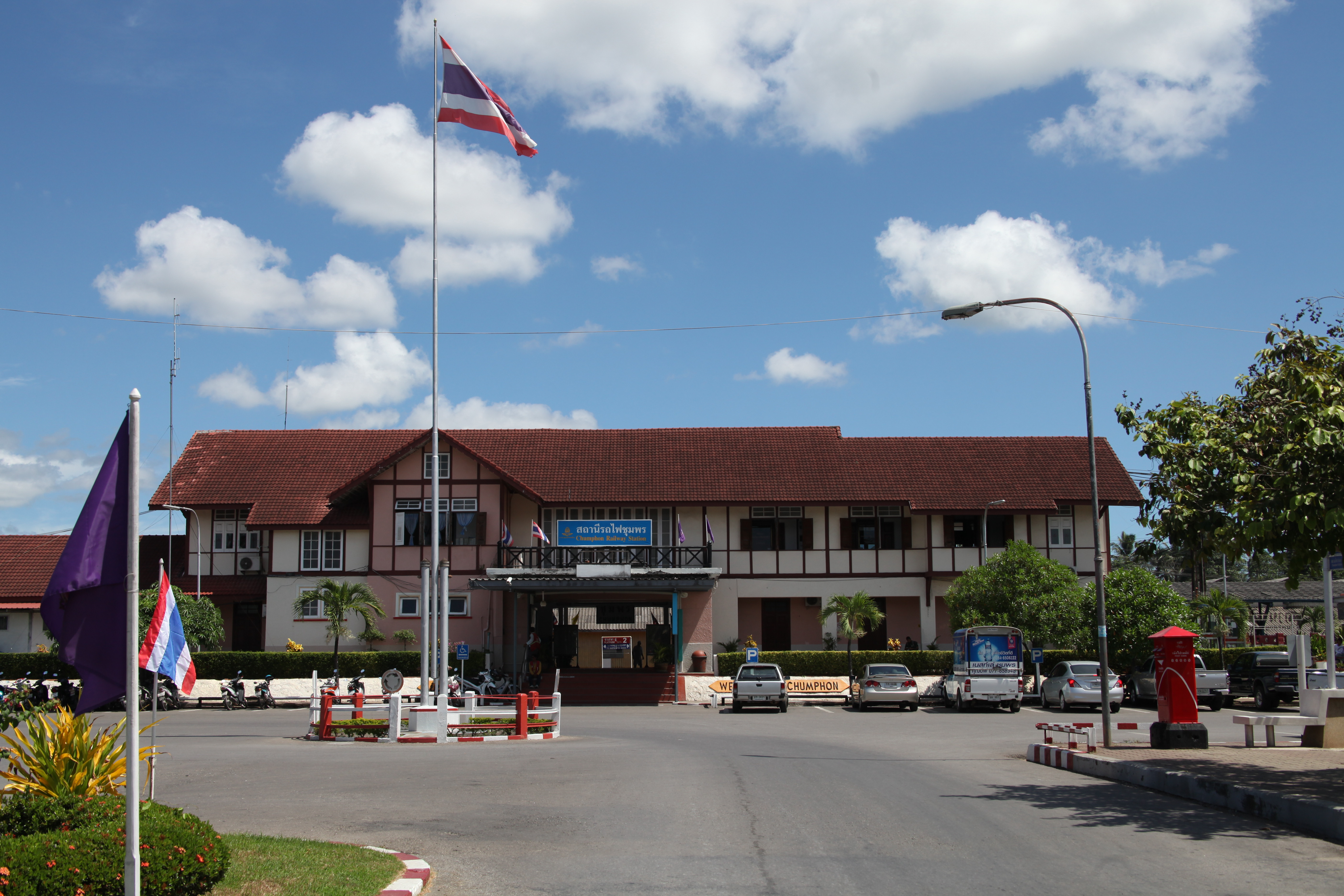

General information
- Location: Nawamin Ruamjai Road, Tha Taphao Subdistrict, Chumphon City
- Owner: State Railway of Thailand
- Line: Southern Line
- Platforms: 2
- Tracks: 10; 10 (depot)

Other information
- Station code: ชพ.

Services
Preceding station	State Railway of Thailand	Following station
Na Cha-ang towards Hua Lamphong or Krung Thep Aphiwat	Southern Line	Saeng Daet towards Su-ngai Kolok
Location

Chumphon railway station is a railway station in Tha Taphao Subdistrict, Chumphon City, and is the main railway station for Chumphon Province. It is a class 1 railway station, 468.534 km (291.1 mi) from Thon Buri railway station. It is the first fueling station from Bangkok, and thus all trains going further south must stop here. Chumphon is also the site of a locomotive depot.

There are two preserved steam locomotives at the station:

- E class no. 178 (North British Locomotive Company (NBL) 21810/1919)
- Baldwin Locomotive Works (BLW) 4-6-2 no. 229 (BLW 58675/1926) (Note: Preserved as no. 235 (BLW 59441/1926). Refer to Pass et al. (2024).)

== History ==
Chumphon was the location where the two sides of the Southern Line construction met, one from Thon Buri, one from U-Taphao Junction (Hat Yai). This was completed on 17 September 1916, and services started running from Thon Buri to U-Taphao, stopping at Chumphon and Thung Song Junction for fueling and resting (at the time no services ran at night). In 1922, night services became available.

Chumphon was a water and wood refueling station for steam locomotives, as well as a place for reducing carriages going further south.

During the Second World War, Chumphon acted as a junction for the 90 km military line to Khao Fachi, Ranong, under the coordination of the Imperial Japanese Army. The line was built in December 1943. In March 1945, Allied bombings (using Consolidated B-24 Liberators) destroyed Chumphon station and the line to Khao Fachi. After the war, the Japanese requested the dismantling of the railway to prevent further Allied attacks on Japanese military bases.

Chumphon Station was rebuilt in 1948. It is currently being a rebuilt again as part of the double tracking project

== Train services ==
- Thaksinarath Express 31/32 Krung Thep Aphiwat – Hat Yai Junction – Krung Thep Aphiwat
- Thaksin Express 37/38 Krung Thep Aphiwat – Sungai Kolok – Krung Thep Aphiwat
- Special Express 39/40 Krung Thep Aphiwat – Surat Thani – Krung Thep Aphiwat
- Special Express 41/42 Krung Thep Aphiwat – Yala – Krung Thep Aphiwat (suspended due to COVID-19 pandemic)
- Special Express 43/44 Krung Thep Aphiwat – Surat Thani – Krung Thep Aphiwat
- International Express 45/46 Krung Thep Aphiwat – Padang Besar – Krung Thep Aphiwat
- Express 83/84 Krung Thep Aphiwat – Trang – Krung Thep Aphiwat
- Express 85/86 Krung Thep Aphiwat – Nakhon Si Thammarat – Krung Thep Aphiwat
- Rapid 167/168 Krung Thep Aphiwat – Kantang – Krung Thep Aphiwat
- Rapid 169/170 Krung Thep Aphiwat – Yala – Krung Thep Aphiwat
- Rapid 171/172 Krung Thep Aphiwat – Sungai Kolok – Krung Thep Aphiwat
- Rapid 173/174 Krung Thep Aphiwat – Nakhon Si Thammarat – Krung Thep Aphiwat (suspended due to COVID-19 pandemic)
- Ordinary 254/255 Lang Suan – Thon Buri –Lang Suan
- Local 445/446 Chumphon – Hat Yai Junction – Chumphon
