= Su-ngai Kolok railway station =

Rail station in Thailand

Coordinates: 6.0258°N 101.9644°E

Su-ngai Kolok สุไหงโก-ลก
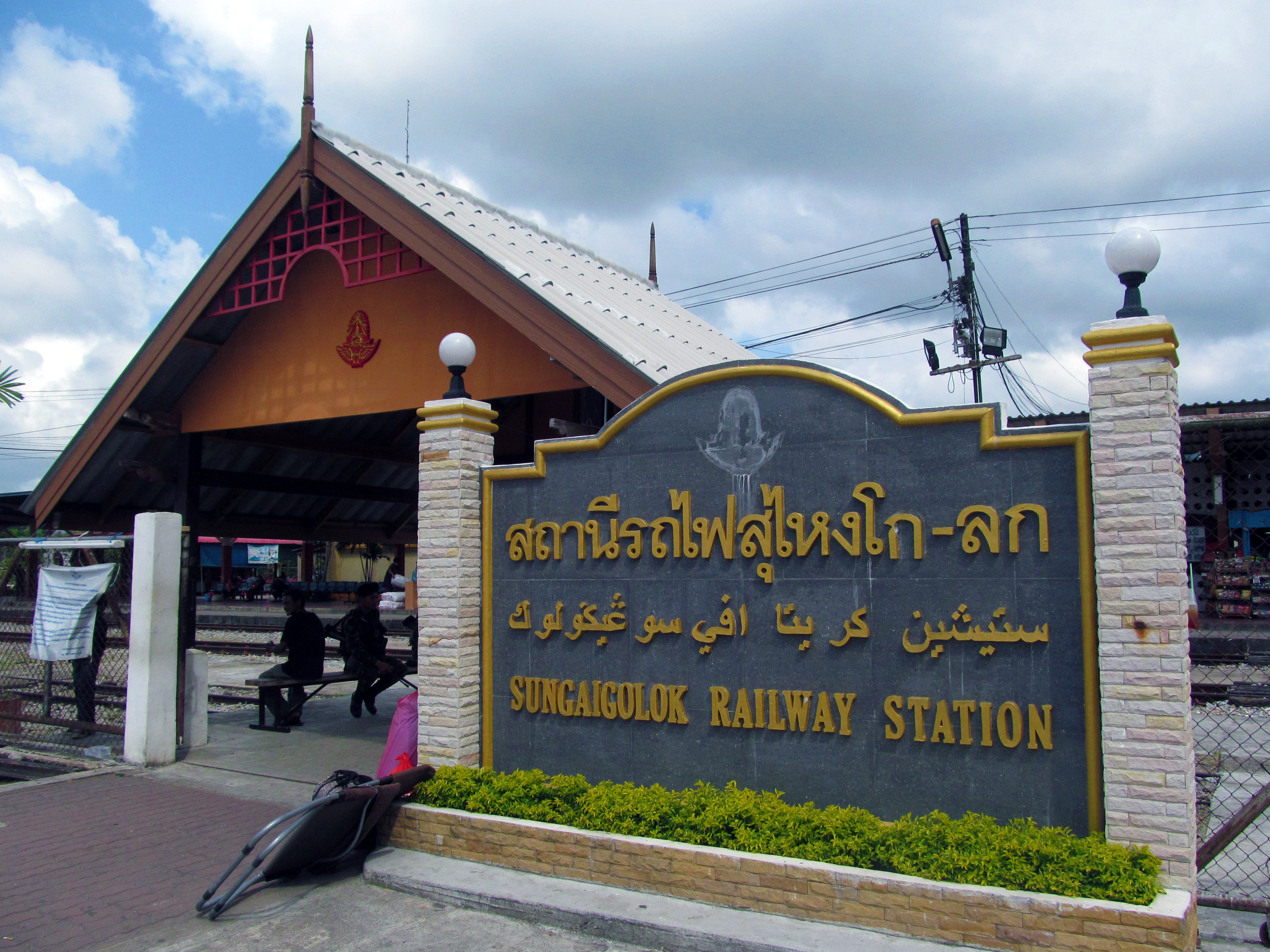

General information
- Location: AH18, Su-ngai Kolok Sub-district, Su-ngai Kolok District; Narathiwat Province; Thailand
- Operator: State Railway of Thailand
- Manager: Ministry of Transport
- Line: Su-ngai Kolok Main Line
- Distance: 1,142.99 km (710.2 mi) from Hua Lamphong
- Platforms: 4
- Tracks: 6

Construction
- Structure type: Concrete building
- Parking: Yes
- Cycle facilities: Yes

Other information
- Station code: โล.
- Classification: Class 1

History
- Opened: 17 September 1921; 104 years ago

Services
Preceding station	State Railway of Thailand	Following station
Khok Saya Halt towards Hua Lamphong or Krung Thep Aphiwat	Southern Line	Terminus
Rail connection to Rantau Panjang (Malaysia) is currently suspended
Location

Sungai Golok railway station is a railway station in Sungai Golok Sub-district, Su-ngai Kolok District, Narathiwat, Thailand. It is a class 1 railway station 1,142.993 km (710.2 mi) from Thon Buri railway station. Sungai Golok Station is the furthest railway station from Bangkok, and the terminus of the Southern Line.

== History ==
The station was opened on 17 September 1921 as part of the Southern Line Tanyong Mas–Su-ngai Kolok section. Su-ngai Kolok borders Malaysia. In the past, rail services used to extend to Rantau Panjang, across the Harmony Railway Bridge, over the Golok River. Later, Thai DMUs took up the entire schedule, up to Tumpat, and this soon led to protests and the disuse of this link. Nowadays, rail cross-border services at this checkpoint are closed. There have been talks about re-establishing this rail border crossing.

== See also ==
- Rantau Panjang railway station
- Rantau Panjang–Sungai Golok Bridge
