= Ban Pong (disambiguation) =

Ban Pong may refer to:

- Ban Pong District, Ratchaburi Province, Thailand
  - Ban Pong, Ratchaburi, central town of Ban Pong district, Thailand
    - Ban Pong Railway Station
- Ban Pong, Phrao, subdistrict of Phrao District, Chiang Mai Province, Thailand
- Ban Pong, Hang Dong, subdistrict of Hang Dong District, Chiang Mai Province, Thailand
- Ban Pong, Ngao, subdistrict of Ngao District, Lampang Province, Thailand
- Ban Pong, Wiang Pa Pao, subdistrict of Wiang Pa Pao district, Chiang Rai Province, Thailand
- Ban Pong, Sung Men, subdistrict of Sung Men District, Phrae Province, Thailand
- Ban Pong (commune), a commune in Cambodia
  - Ban Pong, a village in Bang Pong commune
