= Hang Dong =

Hang Dong may refer to

- Hang Dong District, Chiang Mai Province, Thailand
  - Hang Dong, Hang Dong, a town and subdistrict (tambon) in said district
- Hang Dong, Hot, a subdistrict in Hot District, Chiang Mai Province, Thailand
- Hang-dong, a neighbourhood in Seoul, South Korea
