= Krap Yai =

Krap Yai กรับใหญ่
- Tambon
- Interactive map of Krap Yai
- Coordinates: 13°56′58.1″N 99°52′50.4″E
- Country: Thailand
- Province: Ratchaburi
- Amphoe: Ban Pong

Population (2018)
  - Total: 14,643
- Time zone: UTC+7 (TST)
- Postal code: 70190
- TIS 1099: 700503

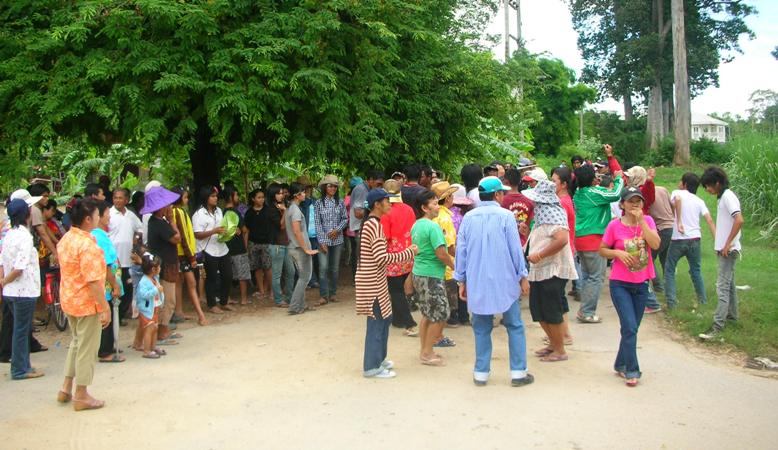
Group of Thai Hakka Chinese in the border of Krap Yai, Ratchaburi and Tha Maka, Kanchanaburi

Krap Yai (Thai: กรับใหญ่, pronounced [kràp jàj]) is a tambon (subdistrict) of Ban Pong District, Ratchaburi Province, western Thailand.

== History and presently ==
Krap Yai, especially at Huai Krabok is a largest Thai Hakka Chinese community in Thailand. It is said that over 100 years ago, there were mainland Chinese and villagers from neighbouring area Ban Lueak, Photharam District migrated to settle here.

Today, Thai Hakka Chinese Krap Yai also retain their form of lifestyle as in the past.

== Geography ==
Krap Yai considered as a border town of three provinces, namely Ratchaburi, Nakhon Pathom, and Kanchanaburi.

Neighboring tambons are (from the north clockwise): Nong Lan of Tha Maka District, Kanchanaburi Province, Nong Ngu Lueam of Kamphaeng Saen and Mueang Nakhon Pathom Districts, Nakhon Pathom Province, Tha Pha and Pak Raet in its district, and Sanam Yae of Tha Maka District, Kanchanaburi Province.

Most of the area is loamy sand.

== Economy ==
Sugarcane and corn are considered important industrial crops of this subdistrict.

== Administration ==
=== Central administration ===
The tambon is subdivided into 10 administrative villages (muban).

No.	Name	Thai
1.	Ban Rang Phlap	บ้านรางพลับ
2.	Ban O I Khiao	บ้านอ้ออีเขียว
3.	Ban Nong Rong	บ้านหนองโรง
4.	Ban Huai Charoen Phon	บ้านห้วยเจริญผล
5.	Ban Nong Klang Dan	บ้านหนองกลางด่าน
6.	Ban Nong Suea	บ้านหนองเสือ
7.	Ban Nong Fak	บ้านหนองฟัก
8.	Ban Nong Prathun	บ้านหนองประทุน
9.	Ban Huai Krabok	บ้านห้วยกระบอก
10.	Ban Nong Klang Dan Tawan Tok	บ้านหนองกลางด่านตะวันตก

=== Local administration ===
The area of the subdistrict is shared by two local governments.

- The subdistrict municipality (Thesaban Tambon) Krap Yai (เทศบาลตำบลกรับใหญ่)
- The subdistrict municipality (Thesaban Tambon) Huai Krabok (เทศบาลตำบลห้วยกระบอก)

== Transport ==
Route 3394 is a main road.

== Sights ==
In the north-west part of the subdistrict adjacent to the border of the three provinces. It is the location of Huai Krabok Market, the local marketplace and community of local Thai Hakka Chinese. It is surrounded by two storey traditional wooden shophouses. It has been restored to a pedestrian street that can walk between the three provinces in just five minutes, and still maintain its identity, whether it is faith, tradition, culture and food.
