= Damrong Wongthong =

Thai Luk thung singer

- ดำรง วงศ์ทอง
- Born: March 20, 1965 (age 61); Ban Pong district, Ratchaburi province, Thailand
- Occupation: Singer
- Musical career
- Genre: Luk thung
- Years active: 1995–present
- Label: Sure Entertainment

Damrong Wongthong (Thai: ดำรง วงศ์ทอง b. March 20, 1965) is a Thai Luk thung singer.

== Early life ==
Wongthong was born in Ban Pong district, northern part of Ratchaburi province, Western Thailand.

== Career ==
He started on stage in 1995. He recorded a compact cassette and the cousin of Cholathee Thanthong, a songwriter, heard it one day. Colathee's cousin took the cassette to Cholathee which led to Cholathee introducing him to Sure Entertainment label.

His popular songs include "Num Rachaphak" (Rachaphak boy), "Proad Phit Cha Rana" (please consider), "Duen Krueng Duang" (half moon), "Nang Sao Helen" (Miss Helen) and "Phoo Ying Khon Sud Tay" (the last woman).

== Discography ==
=== Album ===
- 1995 – Yang Rak Samer ยังรักเสมอ
- 1997 – Mai Rak Mai Wa ไม่รักไม่ว่า
- 1999 – Proad Phit Cha Rana โปรดพิจารณา
- 2000 – Jong Keb Jai Roae จงเก็บใจรอ
- 2001 – Num Rachaphak หนุ่มราชภัฏ
- 2003 – Sanae Num เสน่ห์หนุ่ม
- 2004 – Phleng Ek เพลงเอก
- 2006 – Phoo Ying Khon Sud Thai ผู้หญิงคนสุดท้าย
