= Nam Phrae, Hang Dong =

Coordinates: 18.7097°N 98.9009°E

Nam Phrae น้ำแพร่
- Tambon
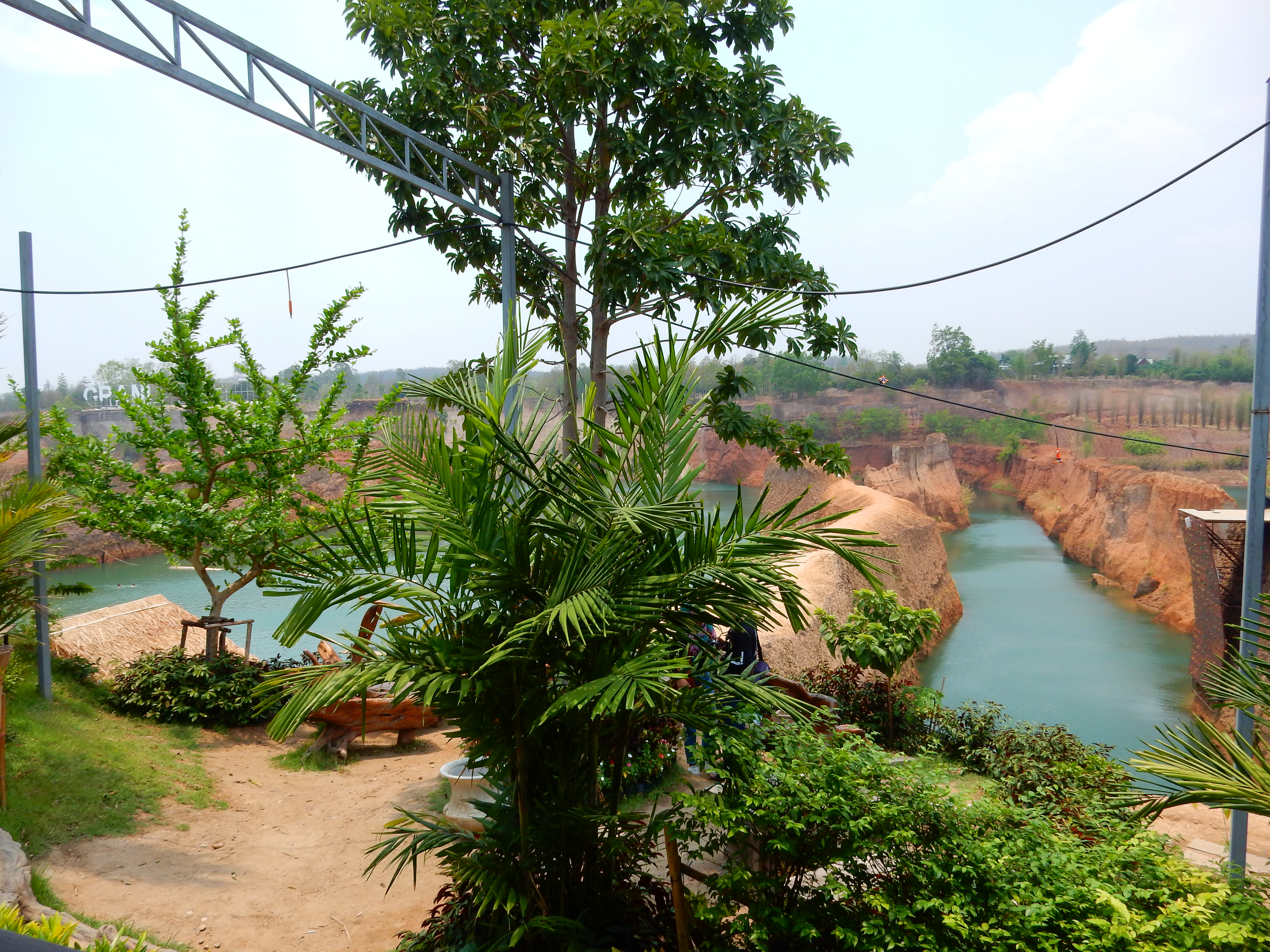
- Chiang Mai, 2016 april
- Interactive map of Nam Phrae
- Country: Thailand
- Province: Chiang Mai
- Amphoe: Hang Dong

Population (2016)
  - Total: 6,830
- Time zone: UTC+7 (ICT)
- Postal code: 50230
- TIS 1099: 501511

Nam Phrae (Thai: น้ำแพร่) is a tambon (subdistrict) of Hang Dong District, in Chiang Mai Province, Thailand. In 2016 it had a population of 6,830 people.

== History ==
The subdistrict was created effective 1 September 1985 by splitting off eight administrative villages from Hang Dong.

== Administration ==
=== Central administration ===
The tambon is divided into 11 administrative villages (mubans).

No.	Name	Thai
1.	Ban Bo	บ้านบ่อ
2.	Ban Sala	บ้านศาลา
3.	Ban Phae Khwang	บ้านแพะขวาง
4.	Ban Nam Phrae	บ้านน้ำแพร่
5.	Ban Pa Chi	บ้านป่าจี้
6.	Ban Saen To	บ้านแสนตอ
7.	Ban Tha Mai Lung	บ้านท่าไม้ลุง
8.	Ban Mae Khamin Tai	บ้านแม่ขนิลใต้
9.	Ban Doi Tham	บ้านดอยถ้ำ
10.	Ban Nam Bun	บ้านน้ำบุ่น
11.	Ban Wiang Dong	บ้านเวียงด้ง

=== Local administration ===
The area of the subdistrict is covered by the subdistrict municipality (thesaban tambon) Nam Phrae Phatthana (เทศบาลตำบลน้ำแพร่พัฒนา).
