= Wat Ton Kwen =

Thai Buddhist temple

- วัดต้นเกว๋น
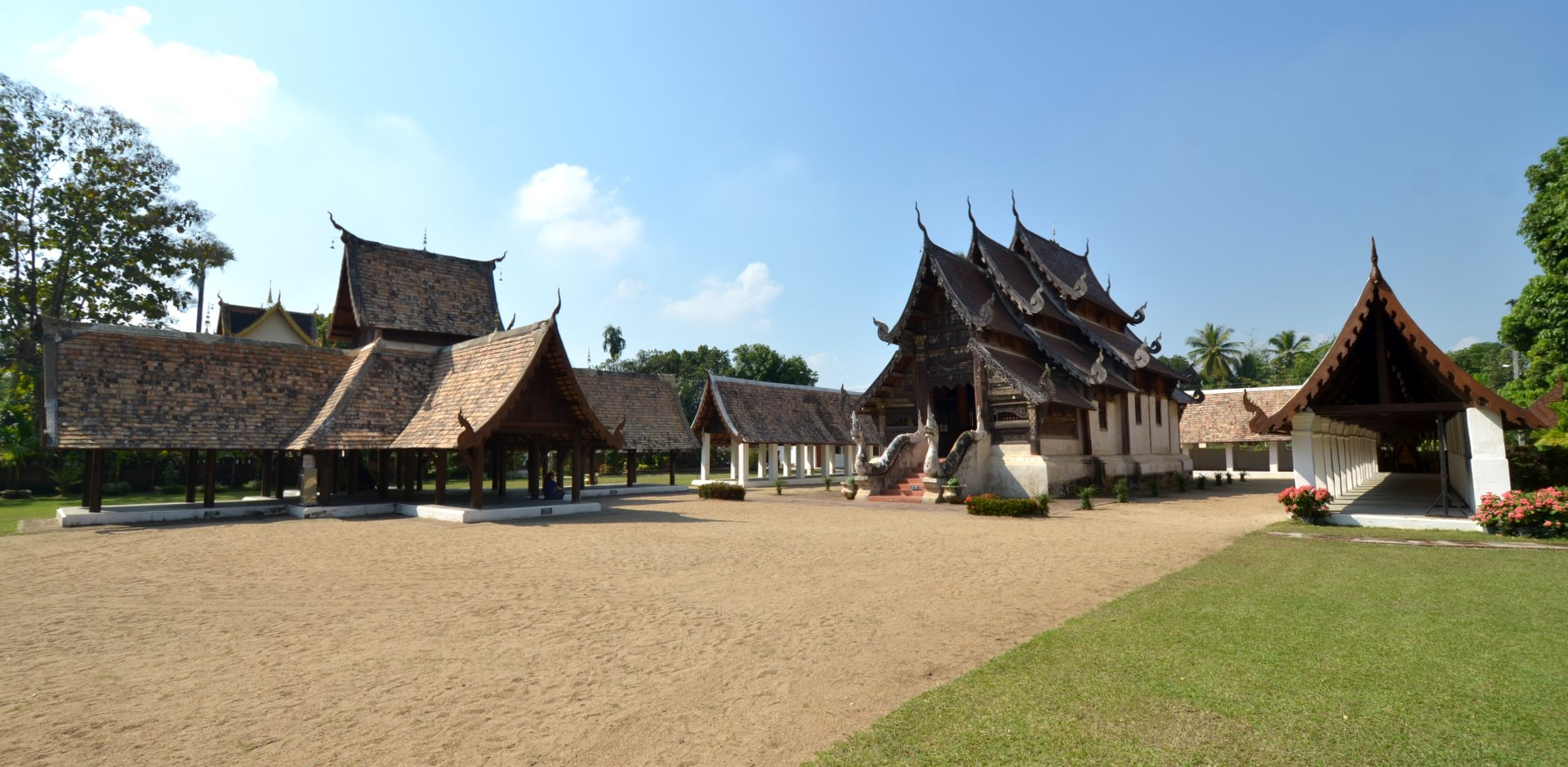
- Wat Ton Kwen

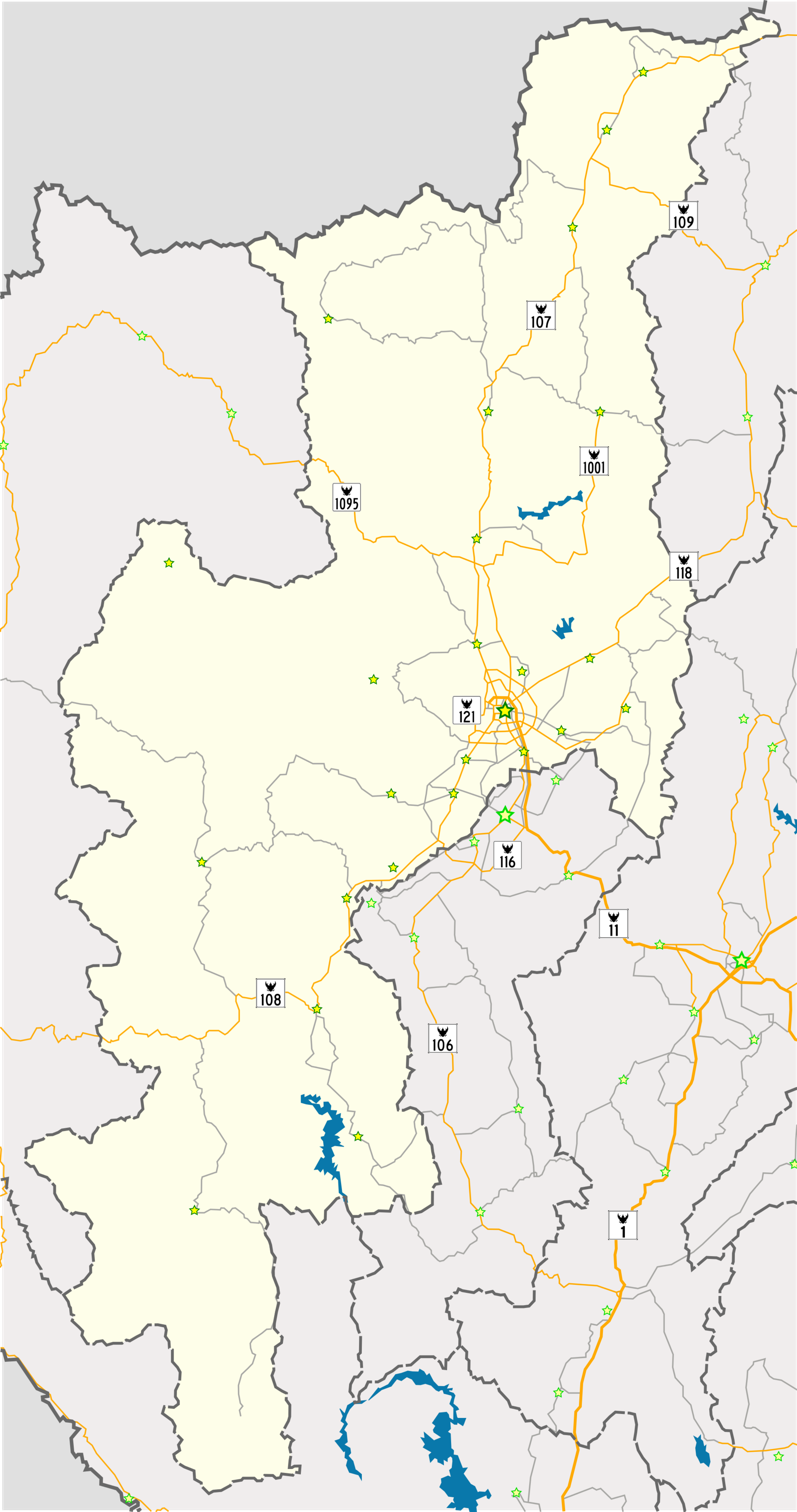
- Location within Chiang Mai Province Location within Thailand

Religion
- Affiliation: Buddhism
- District: Hang Dong district
- Province: Chiang Mai Province
- Region: Northern Thailand
- Status: Active

Location
- Municipality: Chiang Mai
- Country: Thailand
- Interactive map of Wat Ton Kwen
- Coordinates: 18°43′22″N 98°55′31″E

Architecture
- Architect: Kruba In
- Established: circa 1852

Wat Ton Kwen (Northern Thai: ᩅᩢ᩠ᨯᨲᩫ᩠᩶ᨶᩮᨠ᩠ᩅᩁ; Thai: วัดต้นเกว๋น), also known as Wat Inthrawat (Northern Thai: ᩅᩢ᩠ᨯᩍᩕᨶ᩠ᨴᩣᩅᩣ᩠ᩈ; Thai: วัดอินทราวาส), is a Buddhist temple in Nong Khwai, Hang Dong district, Chiang Mai. It was originally built as a resting place for the procession of the Phra Borommathat Si Chom Thong relic during the traditional Hae Phra Chao Khao Wiang ceremony. Wat Ton Kwen is renowned for its well-preserved and highly valuable traditional Lanna architecture. It was registered as a historic site in 1983 and was later recognized as an Outstanding Conservation Building by the Association of Siamese Architects in 1989.

== History ==
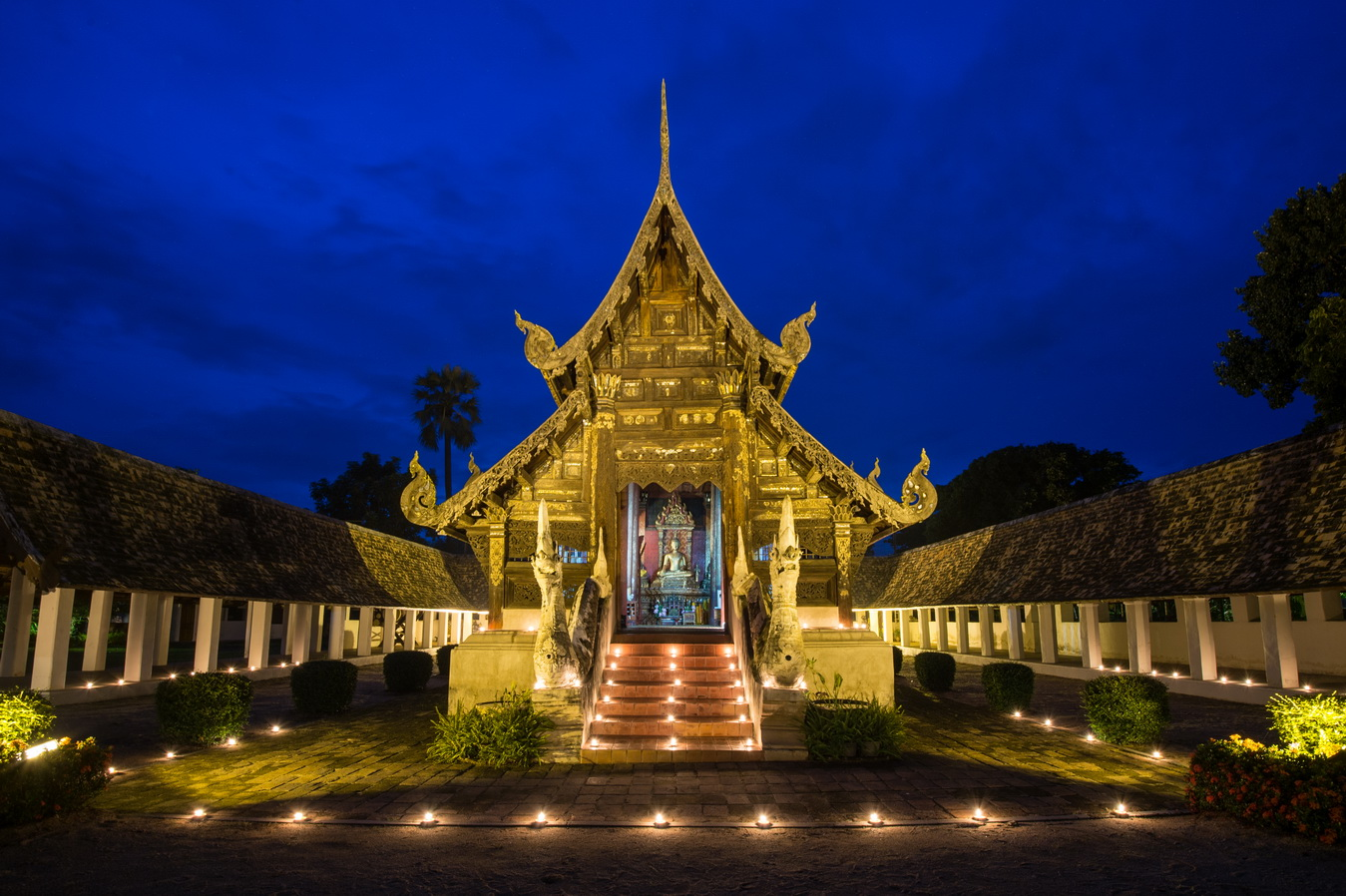
Wihan of Wat Ton Kwen

The temple was first constructed in circa 1852 during the reign of King Kawilorot Suriyawong, the 6th ruler of Chiang Mai. The temple's name originates from the Ton Ba Kwen tree (Muntingia calabura). Later, the temple was renamed after Kruba In, a skilled craftsman who played a significant role in the construction of the viharn (main hall). The viharn was built in 1858 and houses a stucco Buddha image in the Maravijaya posture. The wall behind the principal Buddha image features an arched niche adorned with metal votive tablets. The sala chatummukh (four-portico pavilion), the only one of its kind found in northern Thailand, was constructed around 1856–1869.

The Hae Phra Chao Khao Wiang tradition was an ancient Chiang Mai royal ceremony held annually by the ruler, allowing the townspeople to perform ritual bathing and worship of the Phra Borommathat relic before it was enshrined at Wat Suan Dok and Wat Phra That Doi Suthep in succession. In modern times, this ceremony is only held to commemorate significant anniversaries of Chiang Mai’s founding. The most recent procession took place in 2016 to mark the 720th anniversary of Chiang Mai's establishment.

The Association of Siamese Architects under Royal Patronage declared the vihara of Wat Ton Kwen an outstanding conservation building in 1989.

On September 24, 2020, the temple experienced flooding. However, after the water receded in the evening and a survey was conducted the next morning, it was found to be unaffected.
