= Bueng Krachap =

Lake in Thailand

- บึงกระจับ
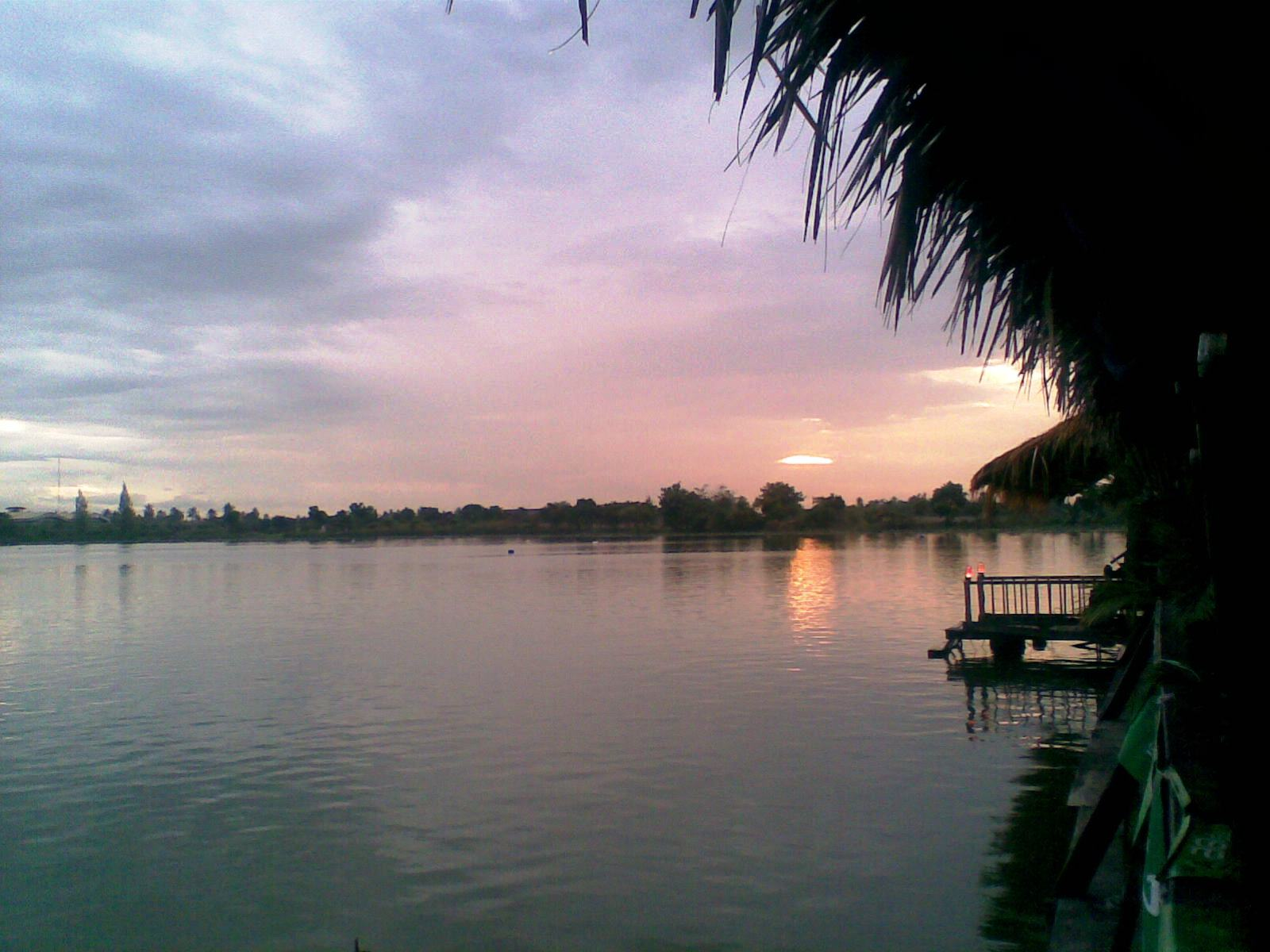
- Northern lakeshore in the early evening

- Location within Thailand
- Location: Ban Pong District
- Coordinates: 13°48′06.8″N 99°55′30.6″E
- Basin countries: Thailand
- Max. length: 0.9 kilometers (0.56 mi)
- Max. width: 0.6 kilometers (0.37 mi)
- Surface area: 0.4 square kilometers (0.15 sq mi)
- Average depth: 1.1 meters (3 ft 7 in)
- Max. depth: 2.5 meters (8 ft 2 in)
- Residence time: UTC+7
- Surface elevation: 19 meters (62 ft)
- Settlements: Ban Pong

Bueng Krachap (Thai: บึงกระจับ, pronounced [bɯ̄ŋ krā.t͡ɕàp]) is a freshwater lake in Thailand, situated in the area of Nong Kop Subdistrict, Ban Pong District, Ratchaburi Province, regarded as the oldest and largest lake in the western region of Thailand.

Bueng Krachap is not a natural waterbody, it is an artificial lake that was excavated in World War II era, with a total area of 251 rai (40.2 ha; 99 acres).

Its name "Bueng Krachap", means "water caltrop lake" ("krachap" in Thai). Formerly there were such plants in this area, but nowadays they have disappeared.

== Places of interest ==
Presently, the lake is a freshwater fish breeding centre, and also a venue for water sports such as jet skiing and canoeing, with a resting place for locals and outsiders.

Around the lake, there are many restaurants to service tourists or locals that visit the place. It has a very beautiful view, especially at sundown.

Wat Bueng Krachap temple and its school are nearby places.
