= Han Kaeo =

Han Kaeo หารแก้ว
- Tambon
- Interactive map of Han Kaeo
- Coordinates: 18°38′39″N 98°55′43″E
- Country: Thailand
- Province: Chiang Mai
- Amphoe: Hang Dong

Population (2020)
  - Total: 5,819
- Time zone: UTC+7 (TST)
- Postal code: 50230
- TIS 1099: 501503

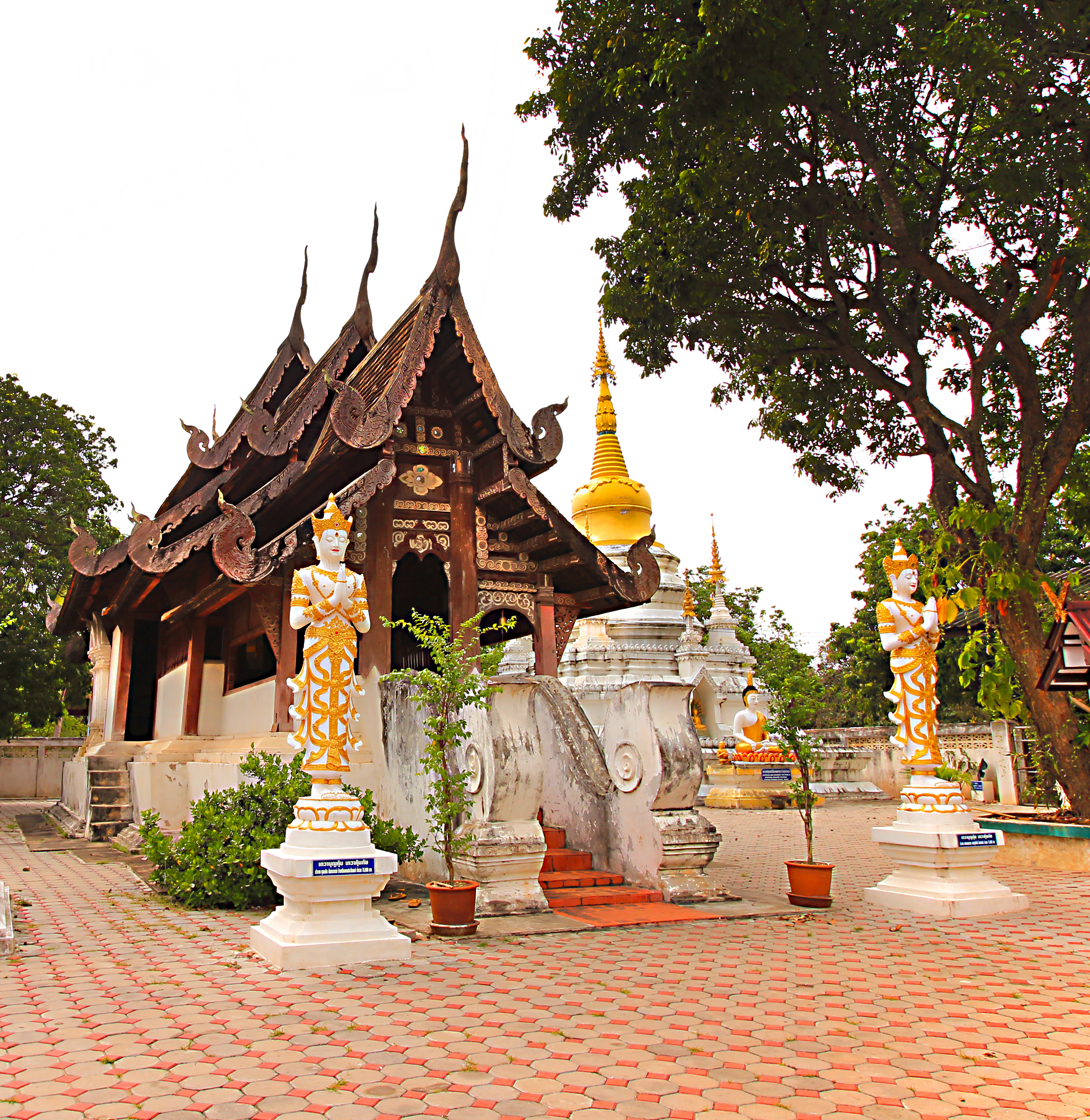

Han Kaeo (Thai: หารแก้ว) is a tambon (subdistrict) of Hang Dong District, in Chiang Mai Province, Thailand. In 2020, it had a total population of 5,819 people.

== Administration ==
=== Central administration ===
The tambon is subdivided into 9 administrative villages (muban).

No.	Name	Thai
1.	Ban San Pa Sak	บ้านสันป่าสัก
2.	Ban Han Kaeo	บ้านหารแก้ว
3.	Ban Thung O	บ้านทุ่งอ้อ
4.	Ban Pa Ngae	บ้านป่าแงะ
5.	Ban Rai	บ้านไร่
6.	Ban Kuan	บ้านกวน
7.	Ban Wuo Lai	บ้านวัวลาย
8.	Ban Ton Kae	บ้านต้นแก
9.	Ban Pa Hiang	บ้านป่าเหียง

=== Local administration ===
The whole area of the subdistrict is covered by the subdistrict municipality (Thesaban Tambon) Han Kaeo (เทศบาลตำบลหารแก้ว).
