= Khlong Bang Tan railway station =

Railway station in Nong Kop, Thailand

Coordinates: 13.8211°N 99.9591°E

Khlong Bang Tan คลองบางตาล
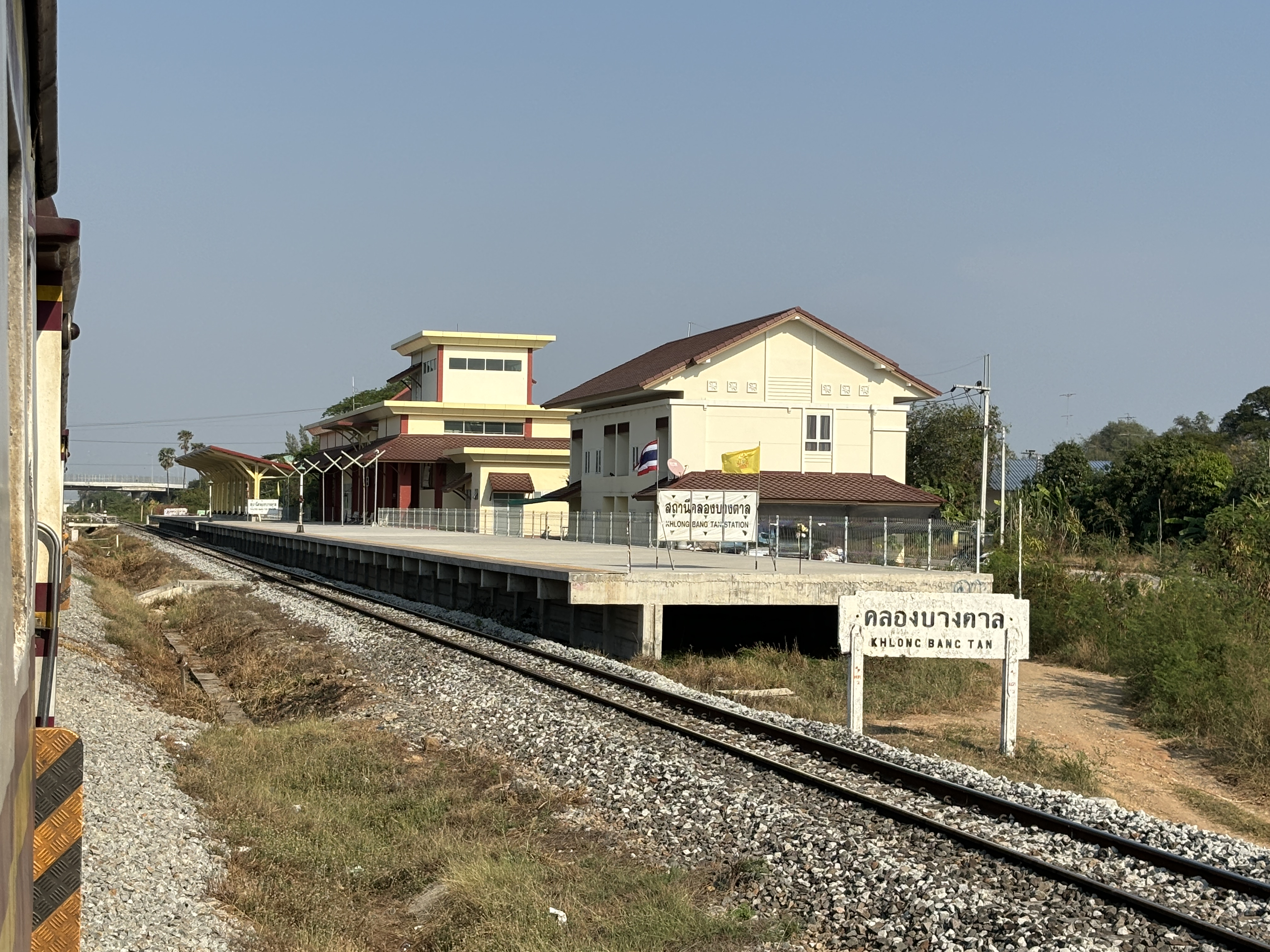
- Khlong Bang Tan railway station in 2024

General information
- Location: Nong Kop Subdistrict, Ban Pong District, Ratchaburi
- Owner: State Railway of Thailand
- Line: Southern Line
- Platforms: 2
- Tracks: 2

Other information
- Station code: บา.

Services
Preceding station	State Railway of Thailand	Following station
Phrong Maduea towards Hua Lamphong or Krung Thep Aphiwat	Southern Line	Nong Pladuk Junction towards Su-ngai Kolok
Location

Khlong Bang Tan railway station (Thai: คลองบางตาล) is a railway station located in Nong Kop Subdistrict, Ban Pong District, Ratchaburi. It is a class 3 railway station located 58.979 km (36.6 mi) from Thon Buri railway station.

In 2023, the station was rebuilt as part of the double-track section from Nakhon Pathom - Chumphon, featuring new station building and elevated platforms.
