= Sop Mae Kha =

Sop Mae Kha สบแม่ข่า
- Tambon
- Interactive map of Sop Mae Kha
- Coordinates: 18°40′42″N 98°58′36″E
- Country: Thailand
- Province: Chiang Mai
- Amphoe: Hang Dong

Population (2020)
  - Total: 2,479
- Time zone: UTC+7 (TST)
- Postal code: 50230
- TIS 1099: 501506

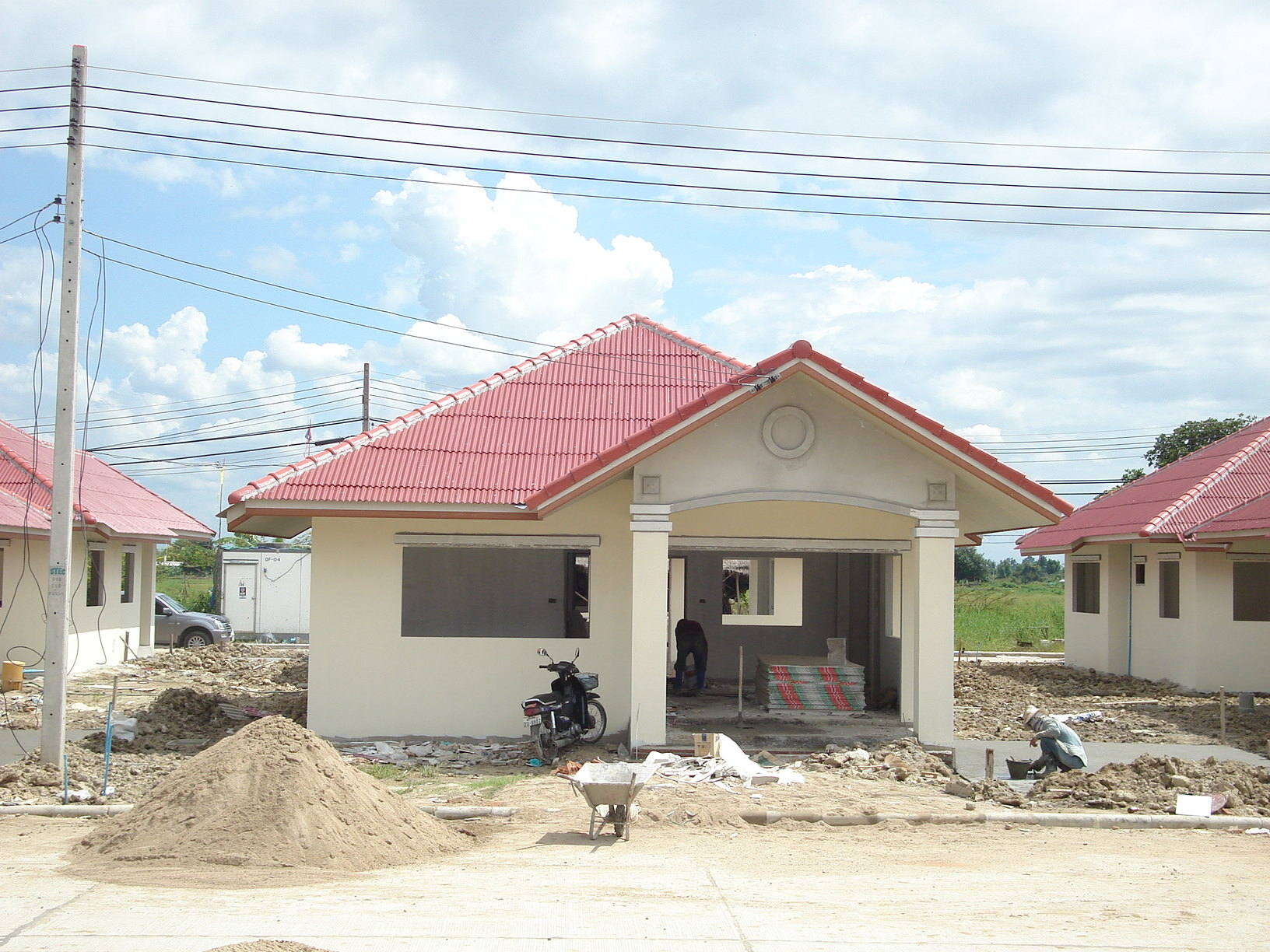

Sop Mae Kha (Thai: สบแม่ข่า) is a tambon (subdistrict) of Hang Dong District, in Chiang Mai Province, Thailand. In 2020 it had a total population of 2,479 people.

== Administration ==
=== Central administration ===
The tambon is subdivided into 5 administrative villages (muban).

No.	Name	Thai
1.	Ban Tha Khi Khwai (Ban Wang Si)	บ้านท่าขี้ควาย (บ้านวังศรี)
2.	Ban Nam Thong	บ้านน้ำโท้ง
3.	Ban Ko	บ้านเกาะ
4.	Ban Tha Sala	บ้านท่าศาลา
5.	Ban Nong Kham	บ้านหนองคำ

=== Local administration ===
The whole area of the subdistrict is covered by the subdistrict administrative organization (SAO) Sop Mae Kha (องค์การบริหารส่วนตำบลสบแม่ข่า).
