= Nong Kaeo, Chiang Mai =

Nong Kaeo หนองแก๋ว
- Tambon
- Interactive map of Nong Kaeo
- Coordinates: 18°40′07″N 98°55′33″E
- Country: Thailand
- Province: Chiang Mai
- Amphoe: Hang Dong

Population (2020)
  - Total: 5,569
- Time zone: UTC+7 (TST)
- Postal code: 50230
- TIS 1099: 501502

Nong Kaeo (Thai: หนองแก๋ว) is a tambon (subdistrict) of Hang Dong District, in Chiang Mai Province, Thailand. As of 2020, the population was 5,569 people.

== Administration ==
=== Central administration ===
The tambon is subdivided into 9 administrative villages (muban).

No.	Name	Thai
1.	Ban Lawo	บ้านละโว้
2.	Ban San Pu Loei	บ้านสันปูเลย
3.	Ban Mueang Nga	บ้านเหมืองง่า
4.	Ban Buak	บ้านบวก
5.	Ban Rong Yaeng	บ้านร้องแหย่ง
6.	Ban Yang Puan	บ้านยั้งปวน
7.	Ban San Sai	บ้านสันทราย
8.	Ban Nong Kaeo	บ้านหนองแก๋ว
9.	Ban San Sai Phatthana	บ้านสันทรายพัฒนา

=== Local administration ===
The whole area of the subdistrict is covered by the subdistrict municipality (Thesaban Tambon) Nong Kaeo (เทศบาลตำบลหนองแก๋ว).
