= Nong Kop =

Nong Kop หนองกบ
- Subdistrict
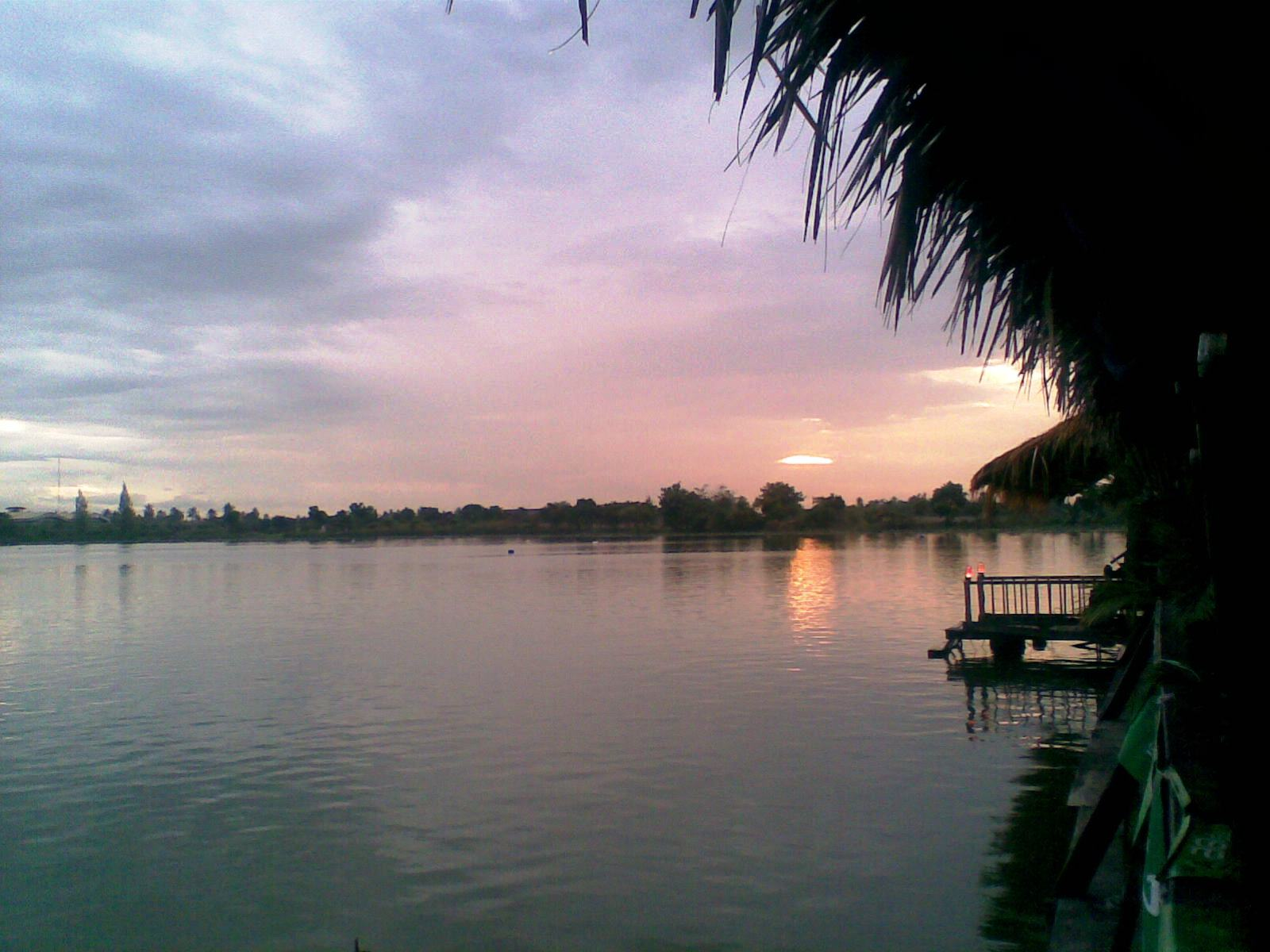
- Bueng Kra Chap, Nong Kop

- Location within Thailand
- Coordinates: 13°49′04″N 99°56′07″E
- Country: Thailand
- Province: Ratchaburi
- District: Ban Pong
- Elevation: 18 m (59 ft)

Population (2018)
  - Total: 11,877
- Time zone: UTC+7 (ICT)
- Postal code: 70110

Nong Kop (Thai: หนองกบ, pronounced [nɔ̌ːŋ kòp]) is a subdistrict (tambon) of the Ban Pong District, Ratchaburi Province in Thailand.

== Overview ==
Nong Kop Subdistrict is flat. Its name, meaning 'frog pond', derives from the many ponds and marshes in the area where frogs thrive. There is much gravel and sand extraction in the subdistrict, an activity which has left the landscape dotted with small lakes. The sub-district has many Lao Wiang communities. The specialty of the subdistrict is grilled chicken from Bang Tan village.

== See also ==
- Khlong Bang Tan Railway Station
