= Nakhon Chum railway station =

Railway station in Nakhon Chum, Thailand

Coordinates: 13.7694°N 99.8563°E

Nakhon Chum นครชุมน์
- Nakhon Chum station in 2025

General information
- Location: Mu 4 (Ban Nakhon Chum), Nakhon Chum Subdistrict, Ban Pong District, Ratchaburi
- Owner: State Railway of Thailand
- Line: Southern Line
- Platforms: 2
- Tracks: 2

Other information
- Station code: นช.

Services
Preceding station	State Railway of Thailand	Following station
Ban Pong towards Hua Lamphong or Krung Thep Aphiwat	Southern Line	Khlong Ta Khot towards Su-ngai Kolok
Location

Nakhon Chum railway station is a railway station in Nakhon Chum Sub-district, Ban Pong District, Ratchaburi. It is a class 3 railway station 74 km (46.0 mi) from Thon Buri railway station.

== History ==
The station opened on 19 June 1903 as part of the first Southern Line section from Bangkok Noi to Phetchaburi. The station initially had no passing loop but was built some time after 1952.

The railway around this section were built on low ground. Therefore, the railway were usually flooded. The tracks were then realigned to a higher embankment on the east of the old railway, resulting in the new main track passing through on the original passing loop, while the original main track became the station's new passing loop. This unintentionally placed the station building on the passing loop instead of the main track. Some parts of the old alignment can still be seen.

In 2024, Nakhon Chum station was rebuilt as part of the double-track section from Nakhon Pathom - Chumphon. The new station featured elevated platforms and a renovated station building.

== Gallery ==
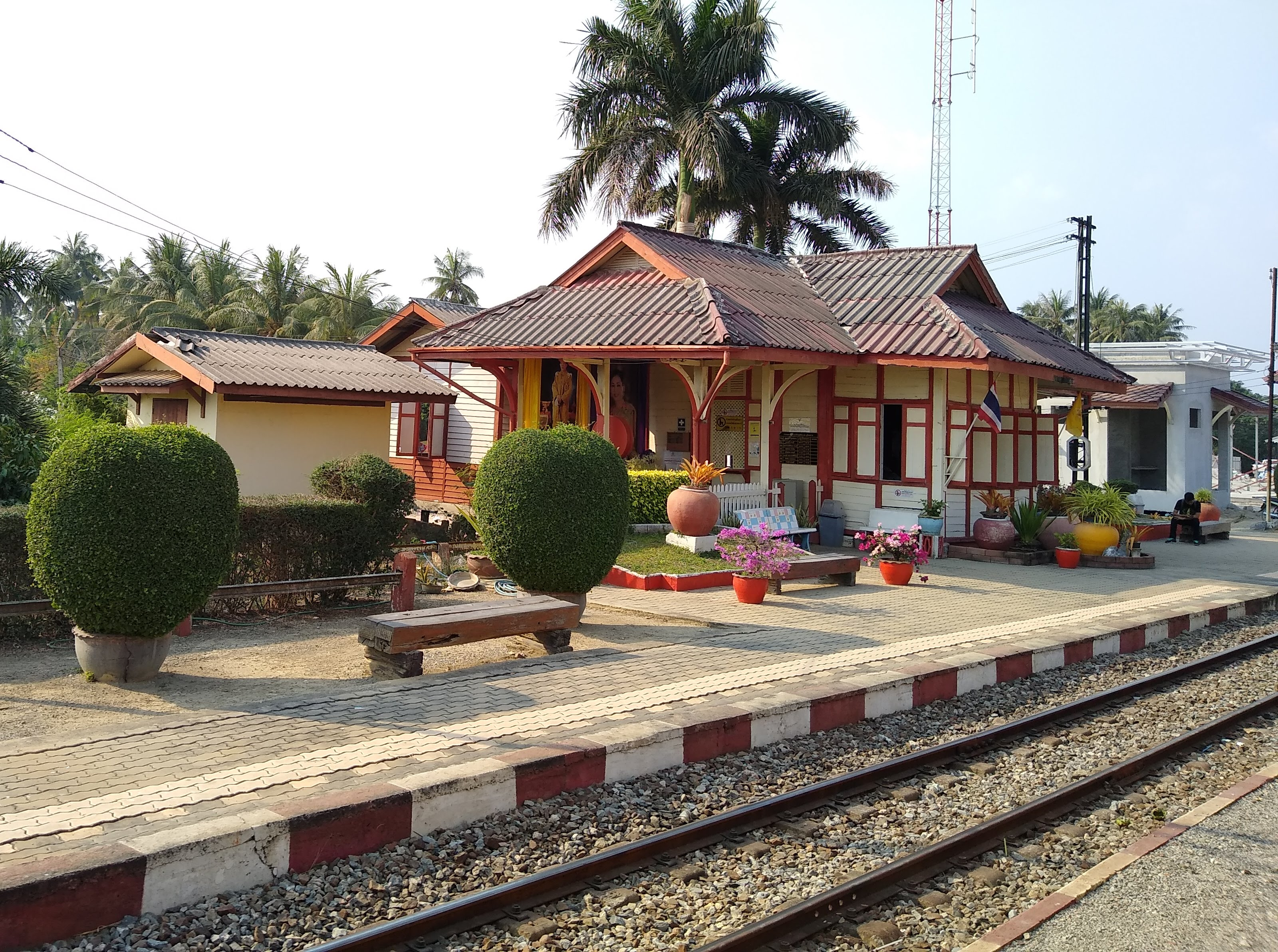
The old station building in 2020

Nakhon Chum station in 2021, during the double-track construction. The station building was on the passing loop.

Station building under renovation

Temporary station office during the renovation
