= San Phak Wan =

Coordinates: 18.7049°N 98.9661°E

San Phak Wan สันผักหวาน
- Tambon
- Interactive map of San Phak Wan
- Country: Thailand
- Province: Chiang Mai
- District: Hang Dong

Population (2016)
  - Total: 14,557
- Time zone: UTC+7 (ICT)
- Postal code: 50230
- TIS 1099: 501508

San Phak Wan (Thai: สันผักหวาน) is a tambon (subdistrict) of Hang Dong District, in Chiang Mai Province, Thailand. In 2016 it had a population of 14,557 people.

== Administration ==
=== Central administration ===
The tambon is divided into seven administrative villages (mubans).

No.	Name	Thai
1.	Ban San Phak Wan	บ้านสันผักหวาน
2.	Ban Ton Ngio	บ้านต้นงิ้ว
3.	Ban Thao Phayu	บ้านท้าวผายู
4.	Ban Pa Tan	บ้านป่าตาล
5.	Ban Boe	บ้านเบ้อ
6.	Ban Khua Deng	บ้านขัวเด้ง
7.	Ban San Phak Wan Noi	บ้านสันผักหวานหน้อย

=== Local administration ===
The area of the subdistrict is covered by the subdistrict municipality (thesaban tambon) San Phak Wan (เทศบาลตำบลสันผักหวาน).
