= Pak Raet =

Pak Raet ปากแรต
- Subdistrict
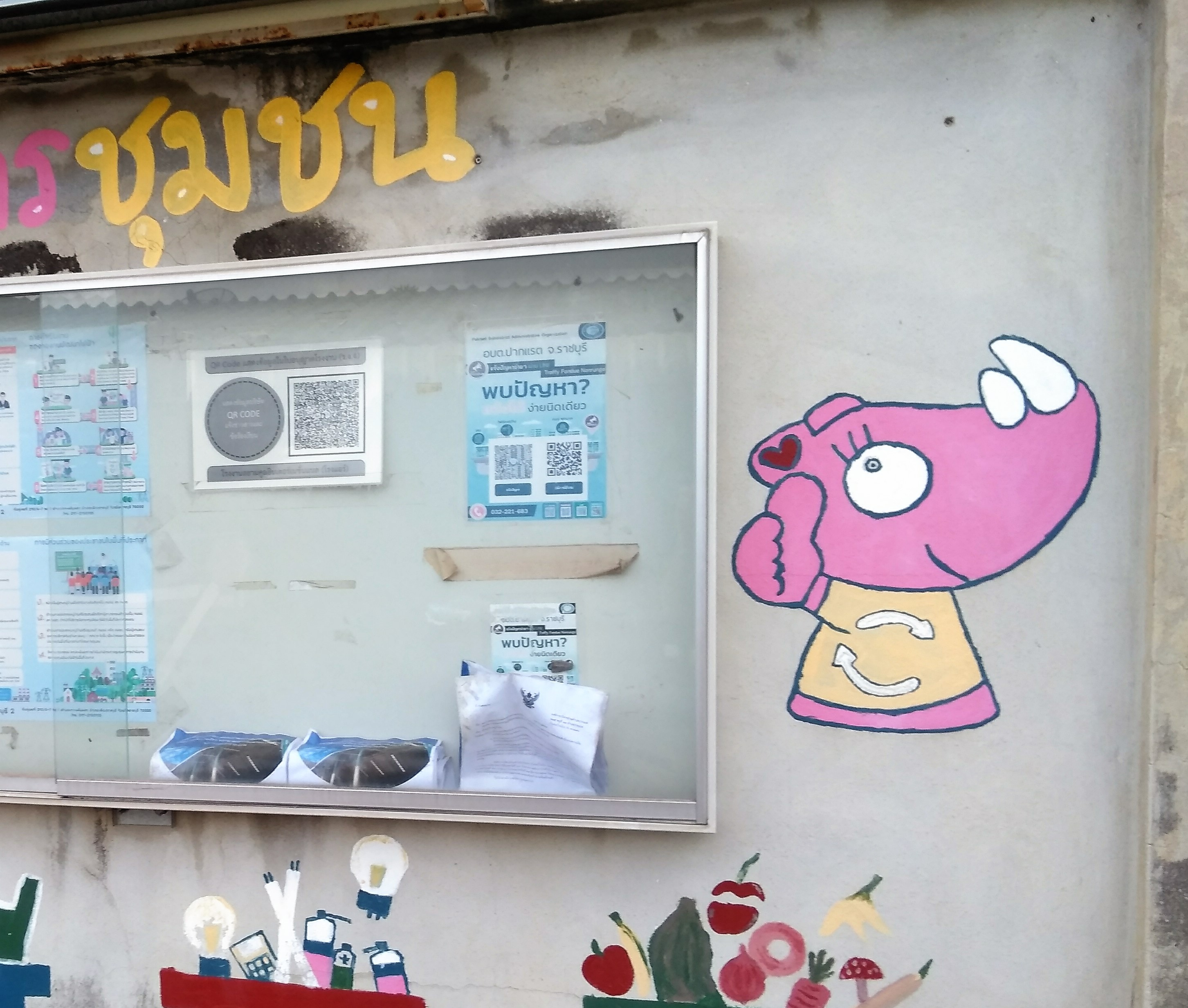
- The mascot of Pak Raet Subdistrict is a rhinoceros ("Raet" in Thai).

- Location within Thailand
- Coordinates: 13°49′16″N 99°53′17″E
- Country: Thailand
- Province: Ratchaburi
- District: Ban Pong
- Elevation: 18 m (59 ft)

Population (2018)
  - Total: 16,238
- Time zone: UTC+7 (ICT)
- Postal code: 70110

Pak Raet (Thai: ปากแรต) is a subdistrict (tambon) of Ban Pong District, Ratchaburi Province, Thailand.

== Overview ==
Pak Raet Subdistrict is located to the east of downtown Ban Pong. It is crossed by the Southern Line railway and the AH123 highway. The subdistrict includes residential zones interspersed with industrial compounds, as well as pasture areas for local cattle.

== See also ==
- Thai President Foods ("MAMA")
