= Boek Phrai, Ban Pong =

Boek Phrai เบิกไพร
- Subdistrict
- Location within Thailand
- Coordinates: 13°49′N 99°51′E
- Country: Thailand
- Province: Ratchaburi
- District: Ban Pong
- Elevation: 300 m (980 ft)
- Time zone: UTC+7 (ICT)
- Postal code: 70110

Boek Phrai (Thai: เบิกไพร, pronounced [bɤ̀ːk pʰrāj]) is a subdistrict (tambon) in Ban Pong District, Ratchaburi Province, Thailand. It is also a township (thesaban tambon). Boek Phrai includes 12 villages under the Boek Phrai township administration. Industries in Boek Phrai include a sugar factory, tapioca starch industry, steel, and electronics.
