= Ban Waen =

Ban Waen บ้านแหวน
- Tambon
- Interactive map of Ban Waen
- Coordinates: 18°41′30″N 98°55′47″E
- Country: Thailand
- Province: Chiang Mai
- Amphoe: Hang Dong

Population (2020)
  - Total: 11,356
- Time zone: UTC+7 (TST)
- Postal code: 50230
- TIS 1099: 501507

Ban Waen (Thai: บ้านแหวน) is a tambon (subdistrict) of Hang Dong District, in Chiang Mai Province, Thailand. In 2020, it had a population of 11,356.

== Administration ==
=== Central administration ===
The tambon is subdivided into 13 administrative villages (muban).

No.	Name	Thai
1.	Ban Rai	บ้านไร่
2.	Ban Khong Khao - Ban Waen	บ้านโขงขาว-บ้านแหวน
3.	Ban Thao Bun Rueang	บ้านท้าวบุญเรือง
4.	Ban Chang Kham Noi	บ้านช่างคำน้อย
5.	Ban Chang Kham Luang	บ้านช่างคำหลวง
6.	Ban Pak Kong	บ้านปากกอง
7.	Ban Pa Mak	บ้านป่าหมาก
8.	Ban Ton Hueat	บ้านต้นเฮือด
9.	Ban Duea	บ้านเดื่อ
10.	Ban Chom Thong	บ้านจอมทอง
11.	Ban Du	บ้านดู่
12.	Ban Don Fai	บ้านดอนไฟ
13.	Ban Si San	บ้านศรีสรร

=== Local administration ===
The whole area of the subdistrict is covered by the subdistrict municipality (Thesaban Tambon) Ban Waen (เทศบาลตำบลบ้านแหวน).
