= Nong Tong =

Coordinates: 18.611531°N 98.946607°E

Nong Tong หนองตอง
- Tambon
- Interactive map of Nong Tong
- Country: Thailand
- Province: Chiang Mai
- District: Hang Dong

Population (2005)
  - Total: 9,512
- Time zone: UTC+7 (ICT)

Nong Tong (Thai: หนองตอง) is a tambon (subdistrict) of Hang Dong District, in Chiang Mai Province, Thailand. In 2005 it had a population of 9,512 people. The tambon contains 14 villages.
