= Khun Khong =

Khun Khong ขุนคง
- Tambon
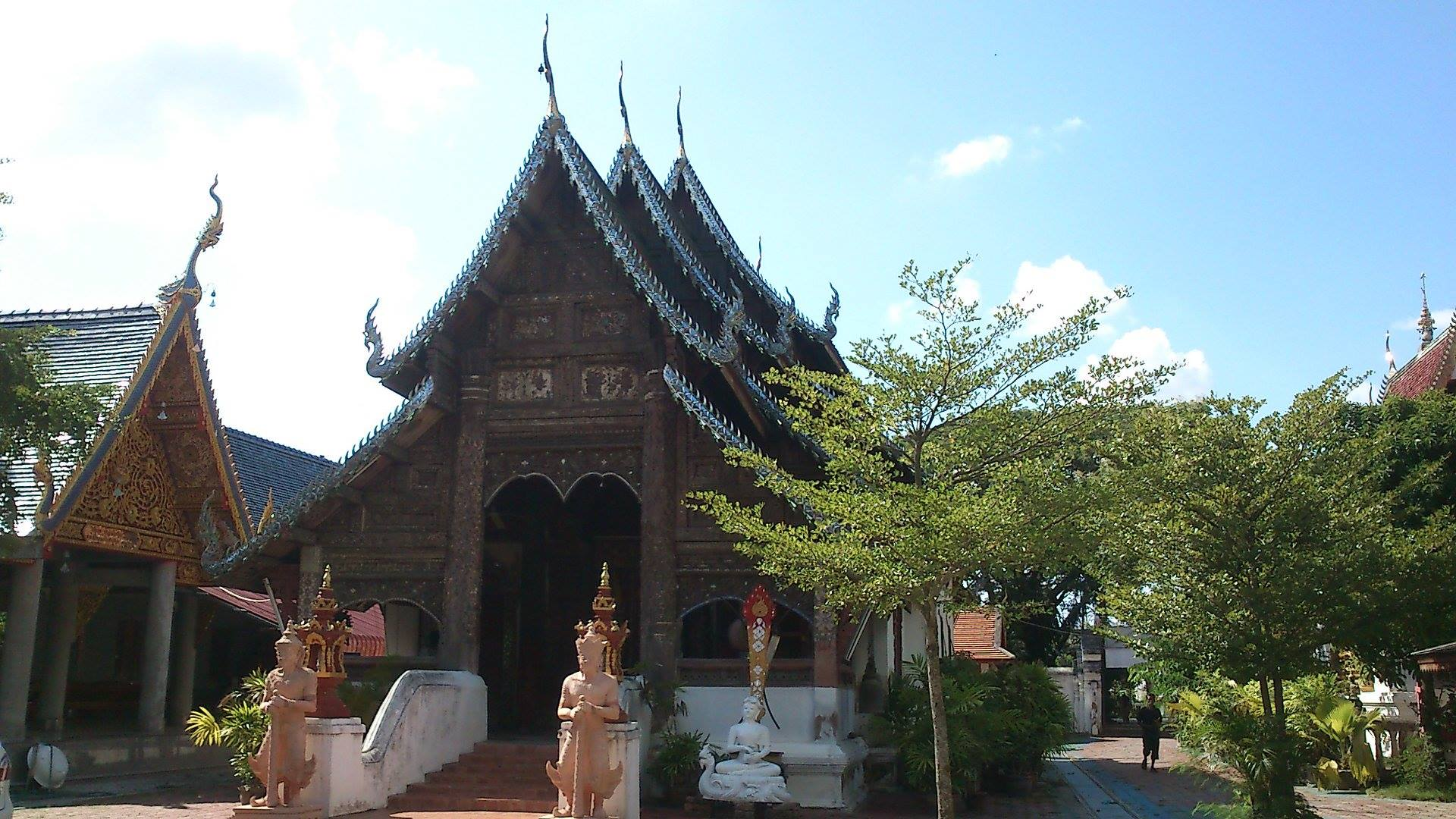
- Wat Khun Kong, Chiang Mai
- Interactive map of Khun Khong
- Country: Thailand
- Province: Chiang Mai
- District: Hang Dong

Population (2005)
  - Total: 4,772
- Time zone: UTC+7 (ICT)

Khun Khong (Thai: ขุนคง) is a tambon (subdistrict) of Hang Dong District, in Chiang Mai Province, Thailand. In 2005 it had a population of 4772 people. The tambon contains 9 villages.
