= Hang Dong district =

Hang Dong หางดง
- District
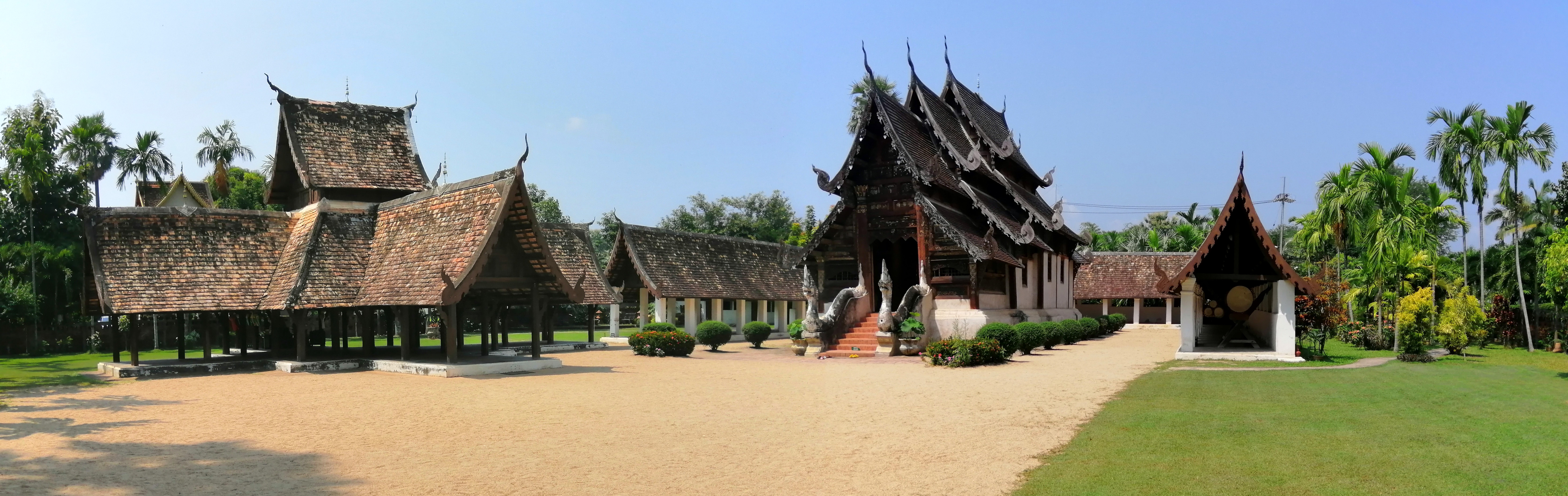
- Wat Ton Kwen

- District location in Chiang Mai province
- Coordinates: 18°41′13″N 98°55′8″E
- Country: Thailand
- Province: Chiang Mai
- Tambon: 11
- Muban: 109

Area
  - Total: 277.1 km^{2} (107.0 sq mi)

Population (2018)
  - Total: 88,926
  - Density: 300.6/km^{2} (779/sq mi)
- Time zone: UTC+7 (ICT)
- Postal code: 50230
- Geocode: 5015

Hang Dong (Thai: หางดง, pronounced [hǎːŋ dōŋ]) is a district (amphoe) of Chiang Mai province in northern Thailand.

== Geography ==
Neighboring districts are (from the southwest clockwise) San Pa Tong, Mae Wang, Samoeng, Mae Rim, Mueang Chiang Mai, Saraphi of Chiang Mai Province, and Mueang Lamphun of Lamphun province.

The village Ban Tawai (บ้านถวาย) in Khun Khong sub-district is known for its handicraft center, as wood carving has been a local speciality since the 1960s.

== History ==
Before 1917, the district was named Mae Tha Chang (แม่ท่าช้าง). 1938 the district was downgraded to a minor district (king amphoe) and made subordinate to Mueang Chiang Mai District. In 1947 it was elevated to full district status again.

Historically, Hang Dong is considered the first place in Thailand where longan was grown. By the Chinese who brought it to the Princess Dara Rasmi, consort of King Chulalongkorn (Rama V). Nowadays, it is considered an industrial drop in the northern Thailand.

== Administration ==
=== Central administration ===
Hang Dong is divided into 11 sub-districts (tambons), which are further subdivided into 109 administrative villages (muban).

No.	Name	Thai	Villages	Pop.
1.	Hang Dong	หางดง	9	11,320
2.	Nong Kaeo	หนองแก๋ว	9	5,425
3.	Han Kaeo	หารแก้ว	9	5,815
4.	Nong Tong	หนองตอง	14	8,564
5.	Khun Khong	ขุนคง	9	5,181
6.	Sop Mae Kha	สบแม่ข่า	5	2,444
7.	Ban Waen	บ้านแหวน	13	11,063
8.	San Phak Wan	สันผักหวาน	7	15,755
9.	Nong Khwai	หนองควาย	12	10,985
10.	Ban Pong	บ้านปง	11	5,367
11.	Nam Phrae	น้ำแพร่	11	6,997

=== Local administration ===
There are 10 sub-district municipalities (thesaban tambons) in the district:

- Nong Tong Phatthana (Thai: เทศบาลตำบลหนองตองพัฒนา) consisting of sub-district Nong Tong.
- Hang Dong (Thai: เทศบาลตำบลหางดง) consisting of parts of sub-district Hang Dong.
- Mae Tha Chang (Thai: เทศบาลตำบลแม่ท่าช้าง) consisting of parts of sub-district Hang Dong.
- Nong Kaeo (Thai: เทศบาลตำบลหนองแก๋ว) consisting of sub-district Nong Kaeo.
- Han Kaeo (Thai: เทศบาลตำบลหารแก้ว) consisting of sub-district Han Kaeo.
- Ban Waen (Thai: เทศบาลตำบลบ้านแหวน) consisting of sub-district Ban Waen.
- San Phak Wan (Thai: เทศบาลตำบลสันผักหวาน) consisting of sub-district San Phak Wan.
- Nong Khwai (Thai: เทศบาลตำบลหนองควาย) consisting of sub-district Nong Khwai.
- Ban Pong (Thai: เทศบาลตำบลบ้านปง) consisting of sub-district Ban Pong.
- Nam Phrae Phatthana (Thai: เทศบาลตำบลน้ำแพร่พัฒนา) consisting of sub-district Nam Phrae.

There are two sub-district administrative organizations (SAO) in the district:

- Khun Khong (Thai: องค์การบริหารส่วนตำบลขุนคง) consisting of sub-district Khun Khong.
- Sop Mae Kha (Thai: องค์การบริหารส่วนตำบลสบแม่ข่า) consisting of sub-district Sop Mae Kha.

== Economy ==
Hang Dong can be regarded as the outskirts Chiang Mai. Currently, the paddy fields and orchards have been replaced by housing estates, with investors from outside the locality to invest. But at the same time, the traditional way of life of some locals still exists.

== Gallery ==
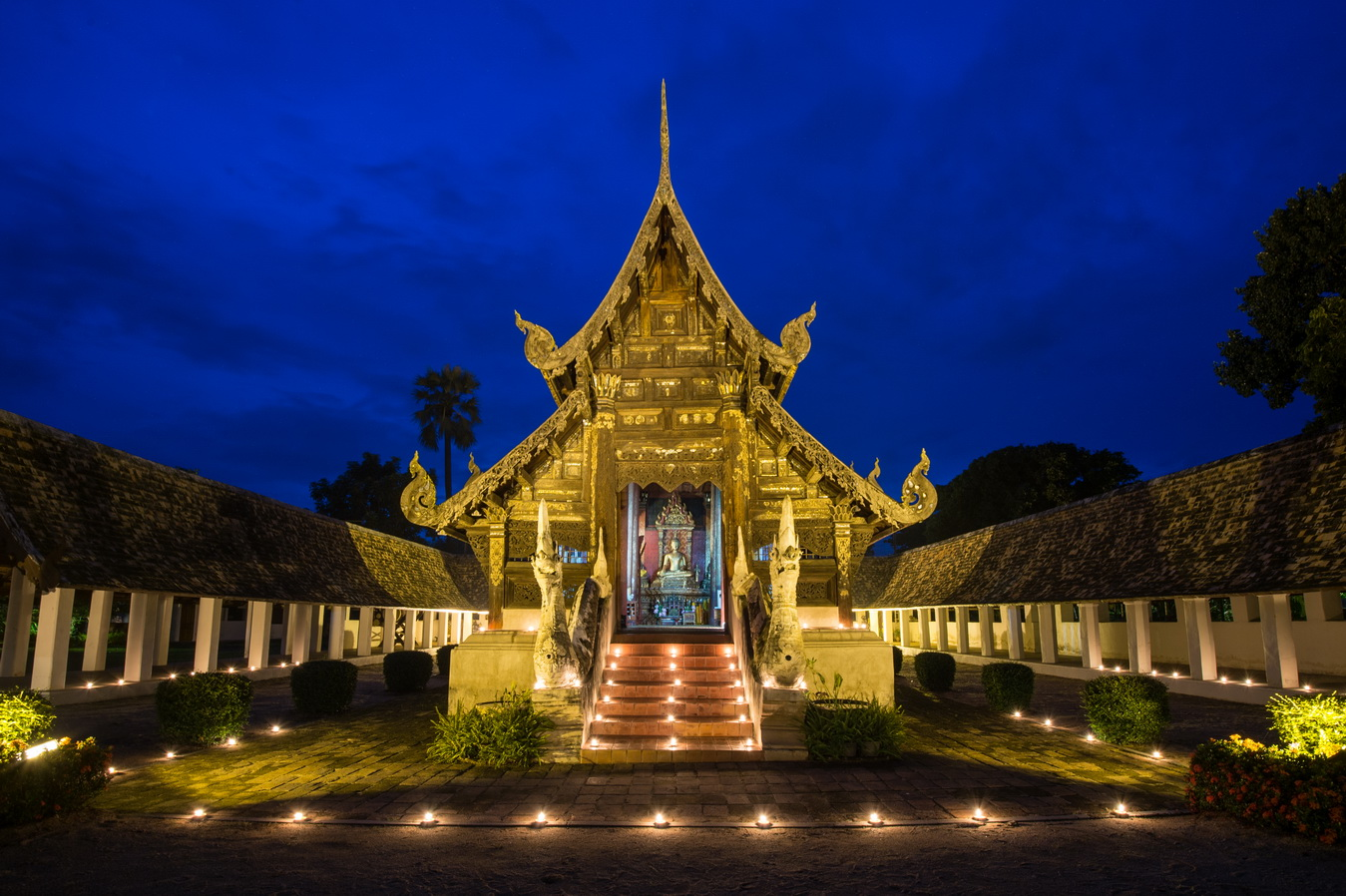
wihan of Wat Ton Kwen, Hang Dong, (c. 1858), 8 km SW of Chiang Mai's walls

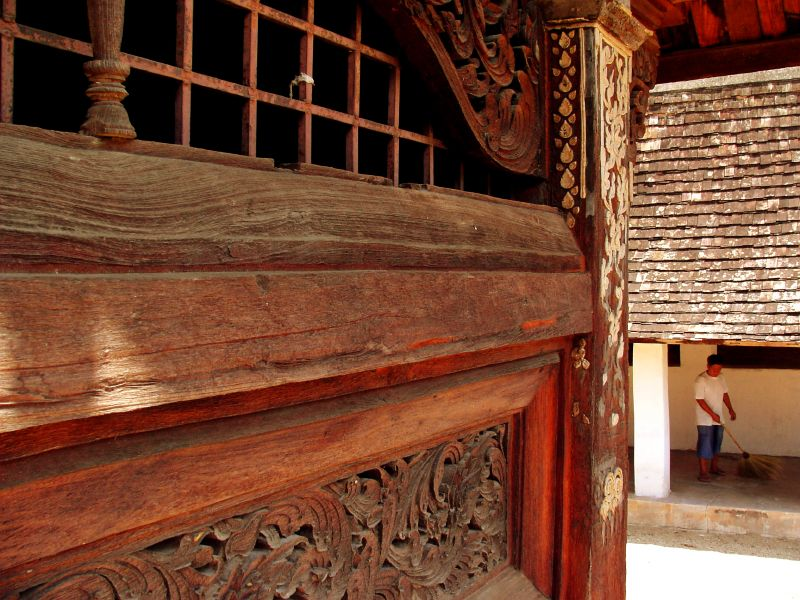
Wat Ton Kwaen, wihan

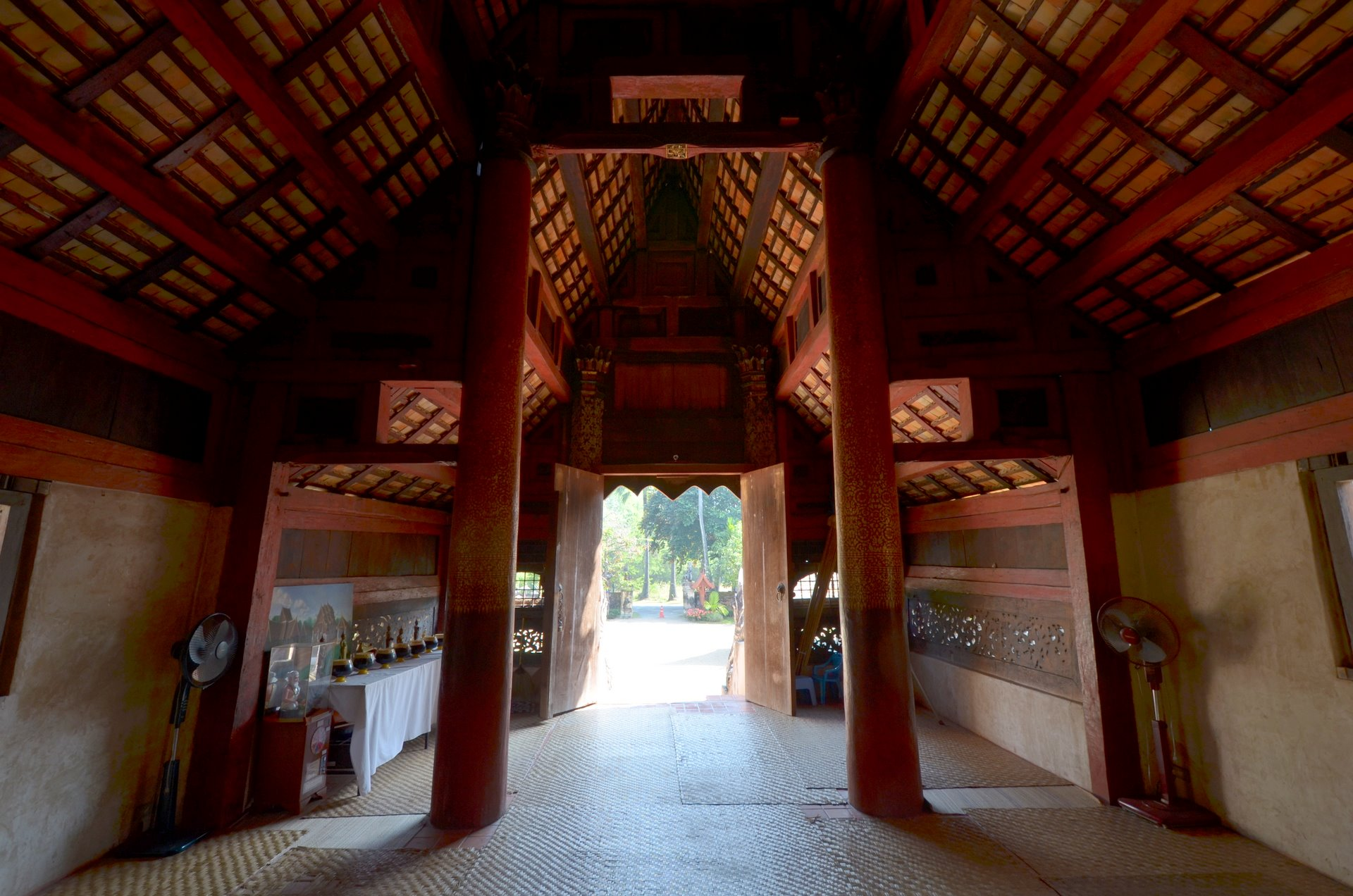
Interior view of the wihan
