= Ban Pong, Hang Dong =

Coordinates: 18.7502°N 98.8895°E

Ban Pong บ้านปง
- Tambon
- Interactive map of Ban Pong
- Country: Thailand
- Province: Chiang Mai
- District: Hang Dong

Population (2005)
  - Total: 4,827
- Time zone: UTC+7 (ICT)

Ban Pong (Thai: บ้านปง) is a tambon (subdistrict) of Hang Dong District, in Chiang Mai Province, Thailand. In 2005, it had a population of 4,827 people. The tambon contains 11 villages.
