= Ban Pong railway station =

Railway station in Thailand

Coordinates: 13.8109°N 99.8756°E

Ban Pong บ้านโป่ง
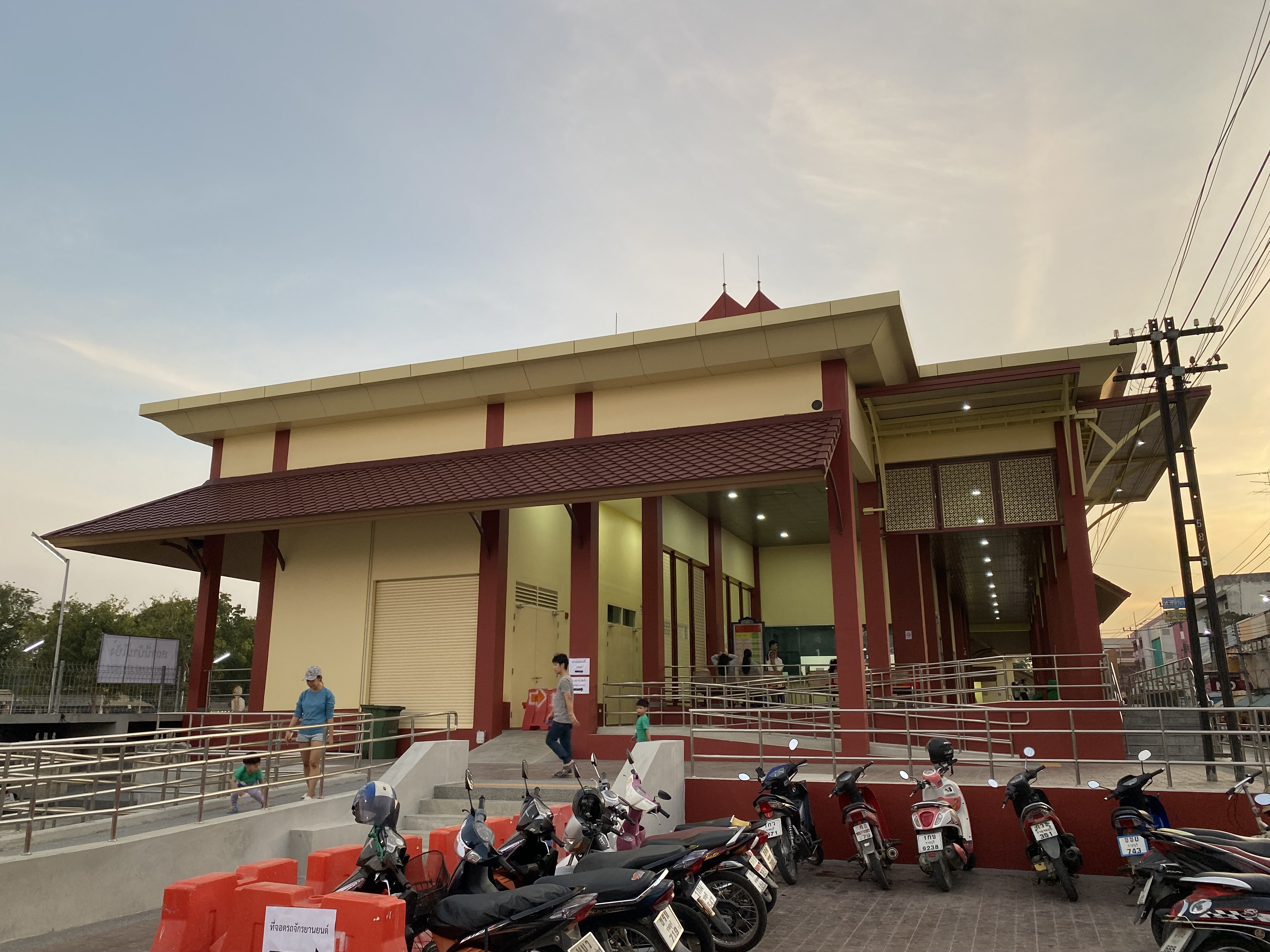
- Front of station

General information
- Location: Hositsakul Road; Ban Pong Subdistrict, Ban Pong District; Thailand
- Owner: State Railway of Thailand
- Line: Southern Line
- Platforms: 2
- Tracks: 4

Other information
- Station code: โป.

History
- Opened: June 1903

Services
Preceding station	State Railway of Thailand	Following station
Nong Pladuk Junction towards Hua Lamphong or Krung Thep Aphiwat	Southern Line	Nakhon Chum towards Su-ngai Kolok
Location

Ban Pong station (Thai: สถานีบ้านโป่ง) is a class 1 railway station in Ban Pong Town, Ban Pong District, Ratchaburi, 68 km (42.3 mi) from Thon Buri railway station. The station acts as an interchange point for the Namtok Branch Line from Nong Pladuk Junction, accessible only from the Thanon Songpol station, also known as Ban Pong 2.

== History ==
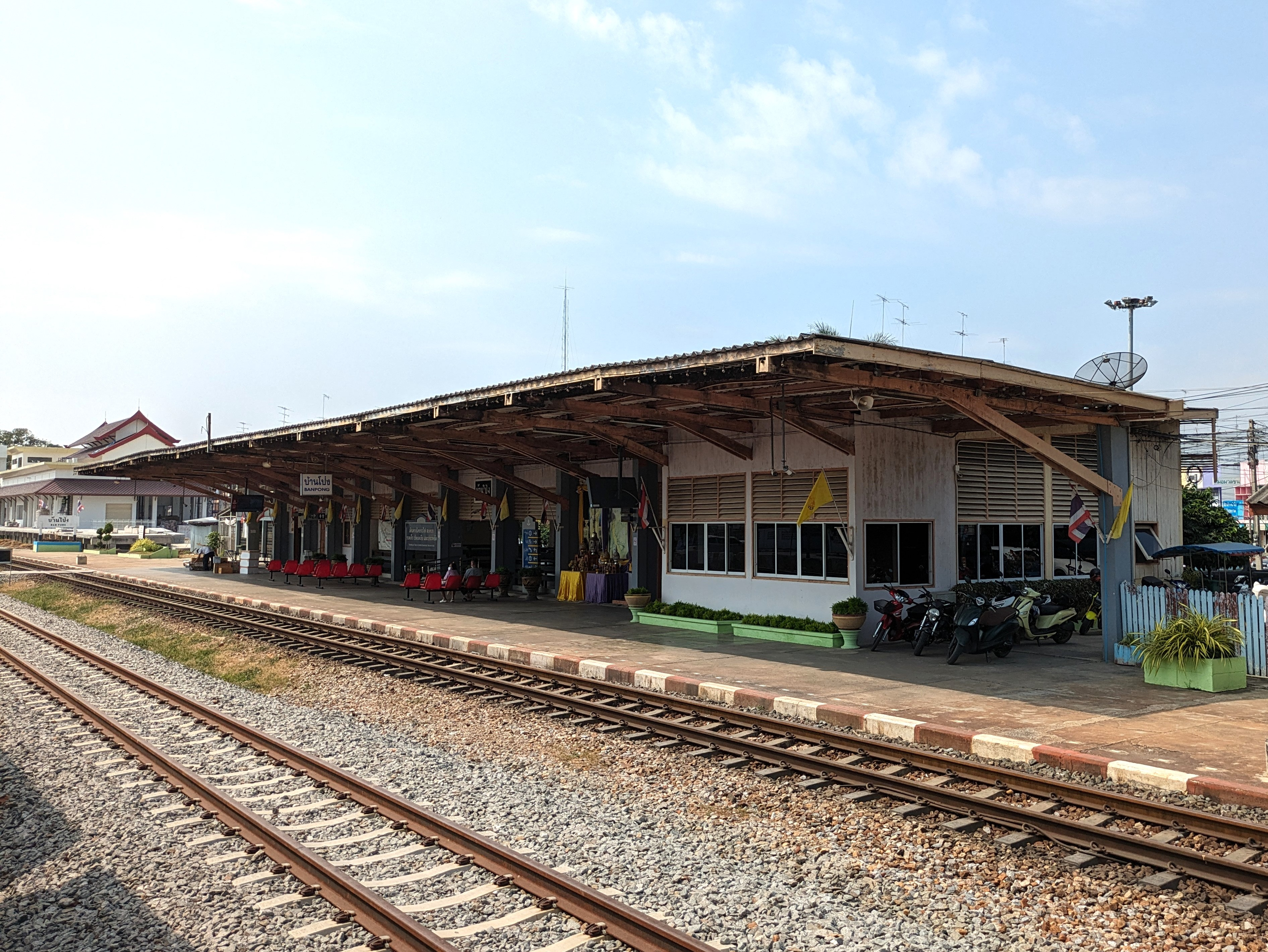
The second-generation station building. Used from the late 1960s to 2024.

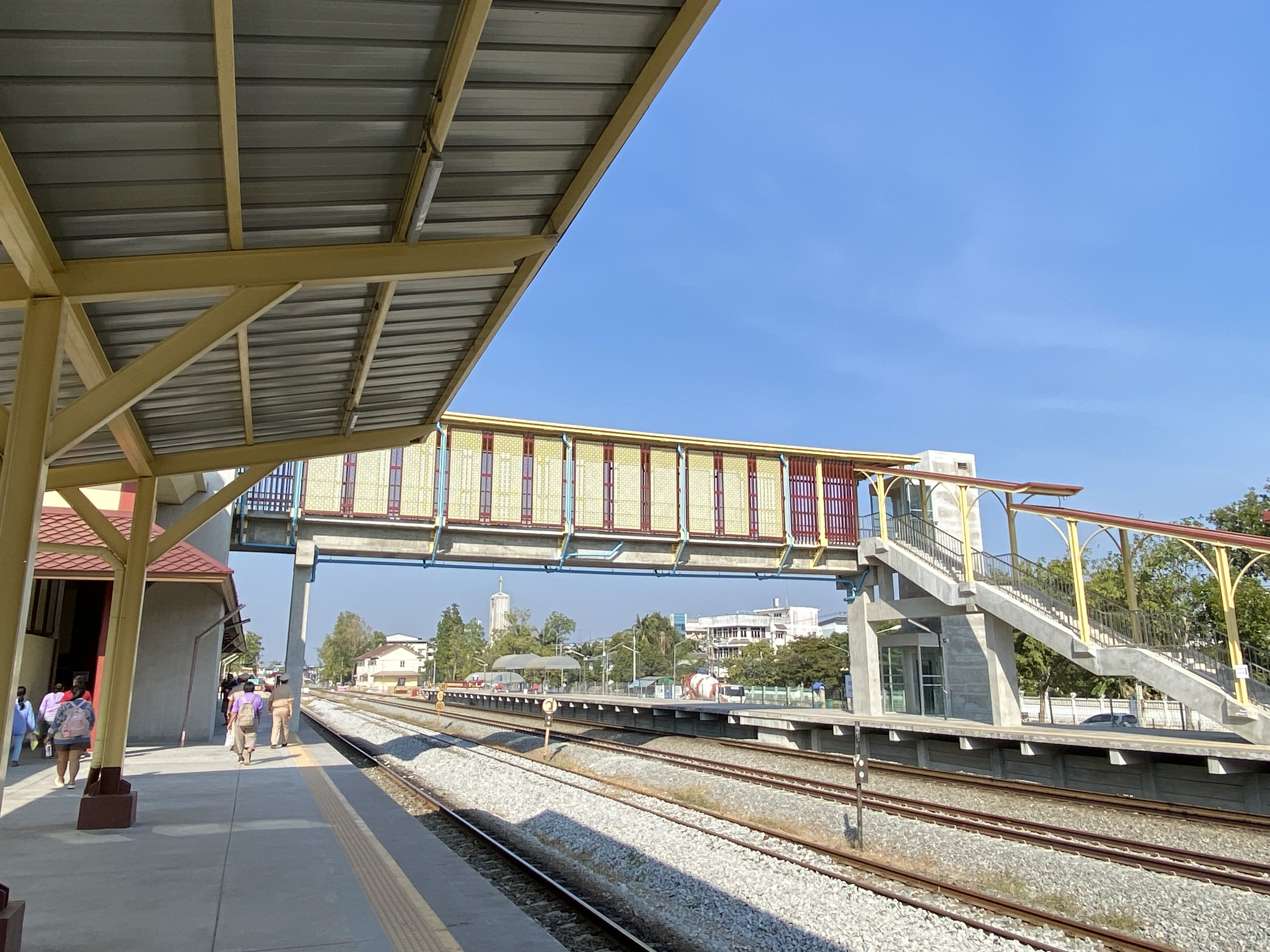
New elevated platforms and footbridge.

Ban Pong Railway Station opened in June 1903 along with the opening of the first phase of the Southern Line from Thon Buri station to Phetchaburi station. During the Second World War, the station was used by the Imperial Japanese Army as an unloading point for POWs from Changi Prison in Singapore to come for the construction of the Burma Railway. Some of these POWs were sent to Kanchanaburi Province for the construction of the railway and some to the nearby Nong Pladuk POW Camp.

In 2024, the station was rebuilt as part of the double-track section from Nakhon Pathom - Chumphon, featuring new station building, a footbridge and elevated platforms.

== See also ==
- Ban Pong, Ratchaburi
