= Nong Khwai =

Nong Khwai หนองควาย
- Tambon
- Location within Thailand
- Country: Thailand
- Province: Chiang Mai
- District: Hang Dong

Population (2005)
  - Total: 8,344
- Time zone: UTC+7 (ICT)

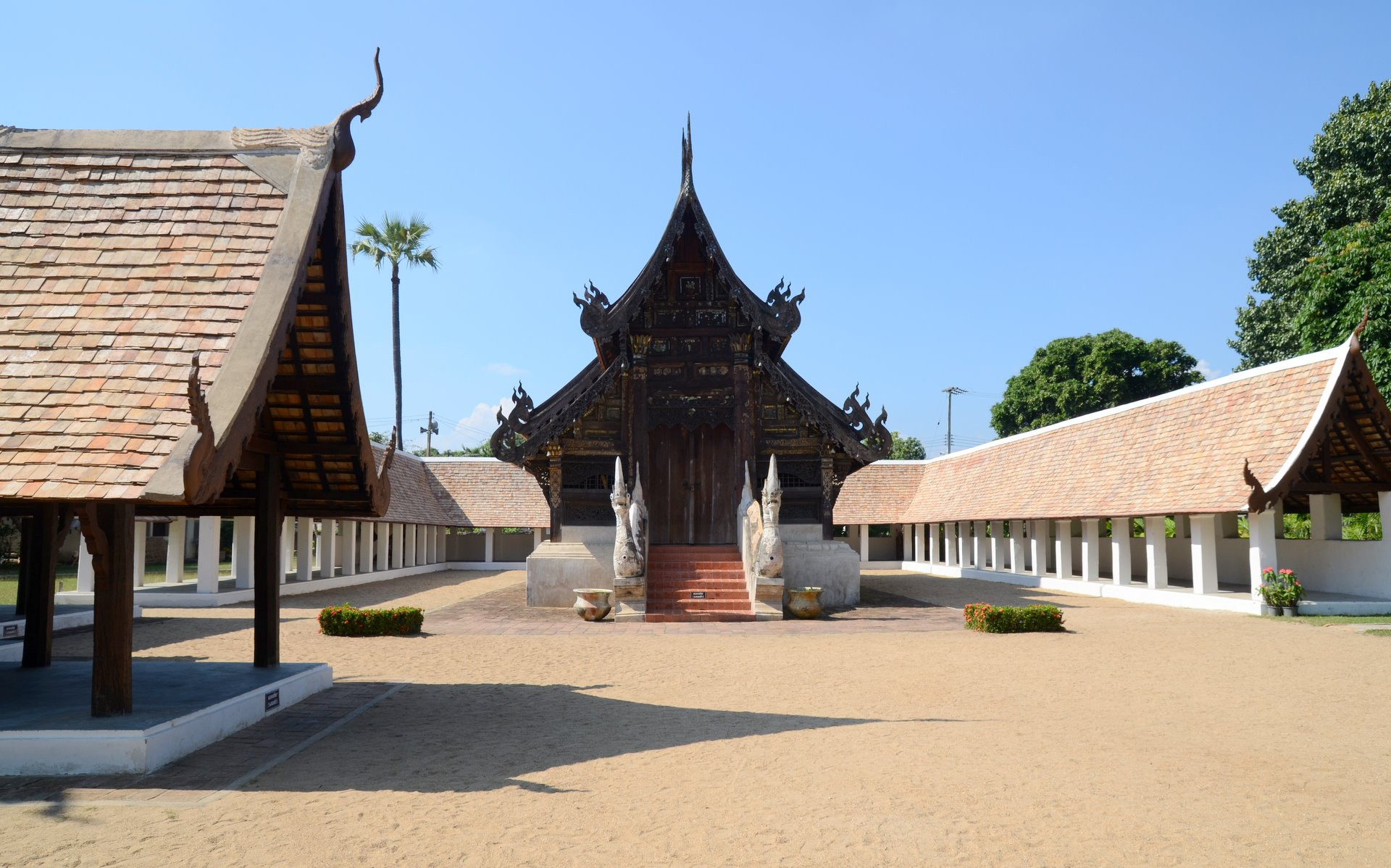

Nong Khwai (Thai: หนองควาย) is a tambon (subdistrict) of Hang Dong District, in Chiang Mai Province, Thailand. In 2005 it had a population of 8344 people. The tambon contains 12 villages.
