= Hang Dong, Hang Dong =

Coordinates: 18.7019°N 98.9162°E

Hang Dong หางดง
- Tambon
- Interactive map of Hang Dong
- Country: Thailand
- Province: Chiang Mai
- District: Hang Dong

Population (2016)
  - Total: 10,866
- Time zone: UTC+7 (ICT)
- Postal code: 50340
- TIS 1099: 501501

Hang Dong (Thai: หางดง) is a tambon (subdistrict) of Hang Dong District, in Chiang Mai Province, Thailand. In 2016, it had a population of 10,866 people.

== Administration ==
=== Central administration ===
The tambon is divided into nine administrative villages (mubans).

No.	Name	Thai
1.	Ban Thao Khamwang	บ้านท้าวคำวัง
2.	Ban Long	บ้านล้อง
3.	Ban Kamphaeng Ngam	บ้านกำแพงงาม
4.	Ban Sai Mun	บ้านทรายมูล
5.	Ban Mae Khak	บ้านแม่ขัก
6.	Ban Dong Luang	บ้านดงหลวง
7.	Ban Pa Pae	บ้านป่าแป๋
8.	Ban Pa Kong	บ้านปากอง
9.	Ban Dong Noi	บ้านดงน้อย

=== Local administration ===
The area of the subdistrict is shared by two local governments.

- Subdistrict municipality (thesaban tambon) Hang Dong (เทศบาลตำบลหางดง)
- Subdistrict municipality (thesaban tambon) Mae Tha Chang (เทศบาลตำบลแม่ท่าช้าง)
