= Ban Pong, Ratchaburi =

Ban Pong บ้านโป่ง
- Town
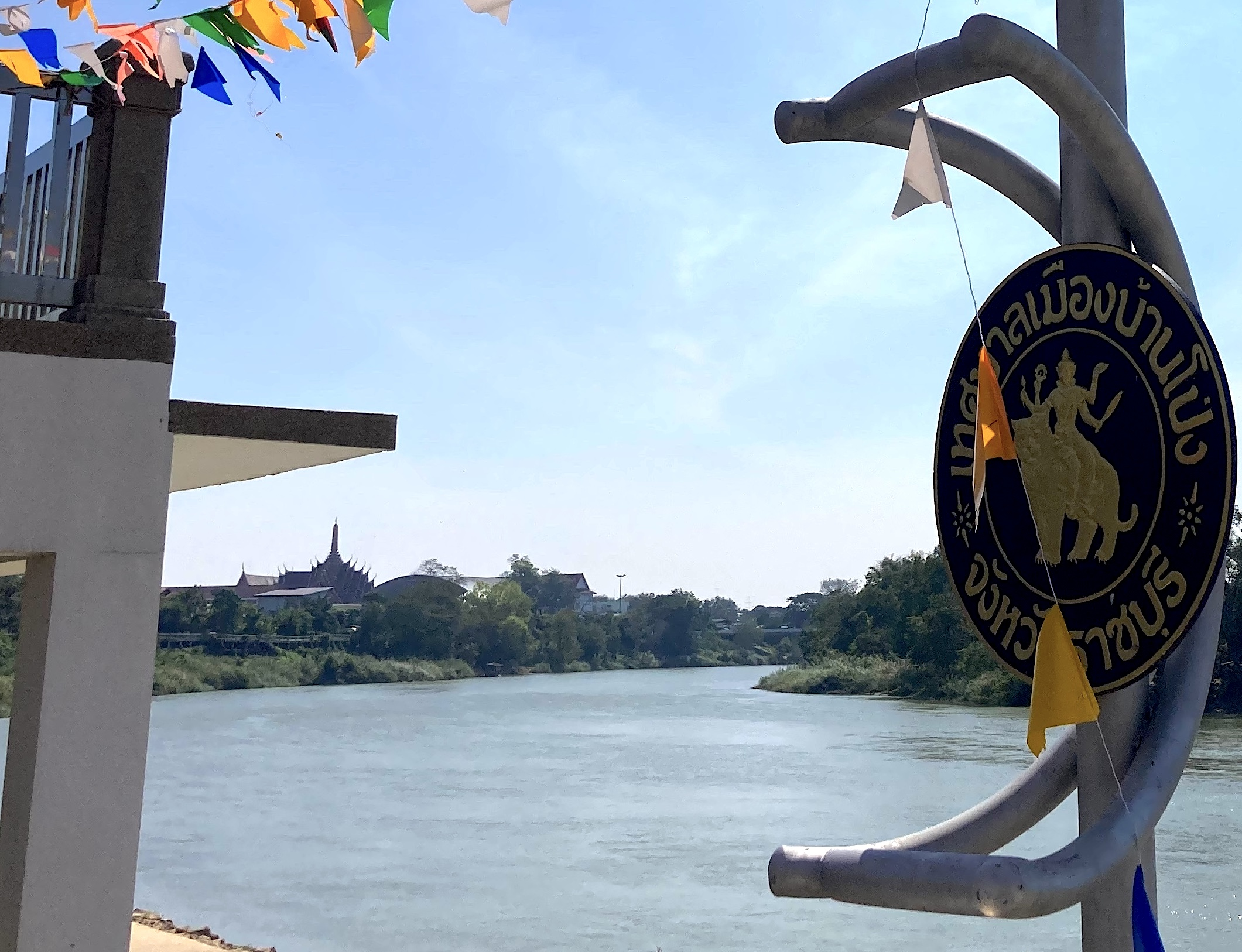
- Looking south along the Mae Klong

- Location within Thailand
- Coordinates: 13.8174°N 99.8830°E
- Country: Thailand
- Province: Ratchaburi
- District: Ban Pong
- Elevation: 13.3 m (44 ft)

Population
  - Total: 171,514
- Time zone: UTC+7 (ICT)

Ban Pong, (Thai: บ้านโป่ง), is a market town along the Mae Klong River in Thailand's Ratchaburi Province. Roughly 80 km (50 mi) west of Bangkok, it is the central town of the sub-provincial Ban Pong district, where its boundary aligned with that of the Ban Pong subdistrict (tambon).

== History ==
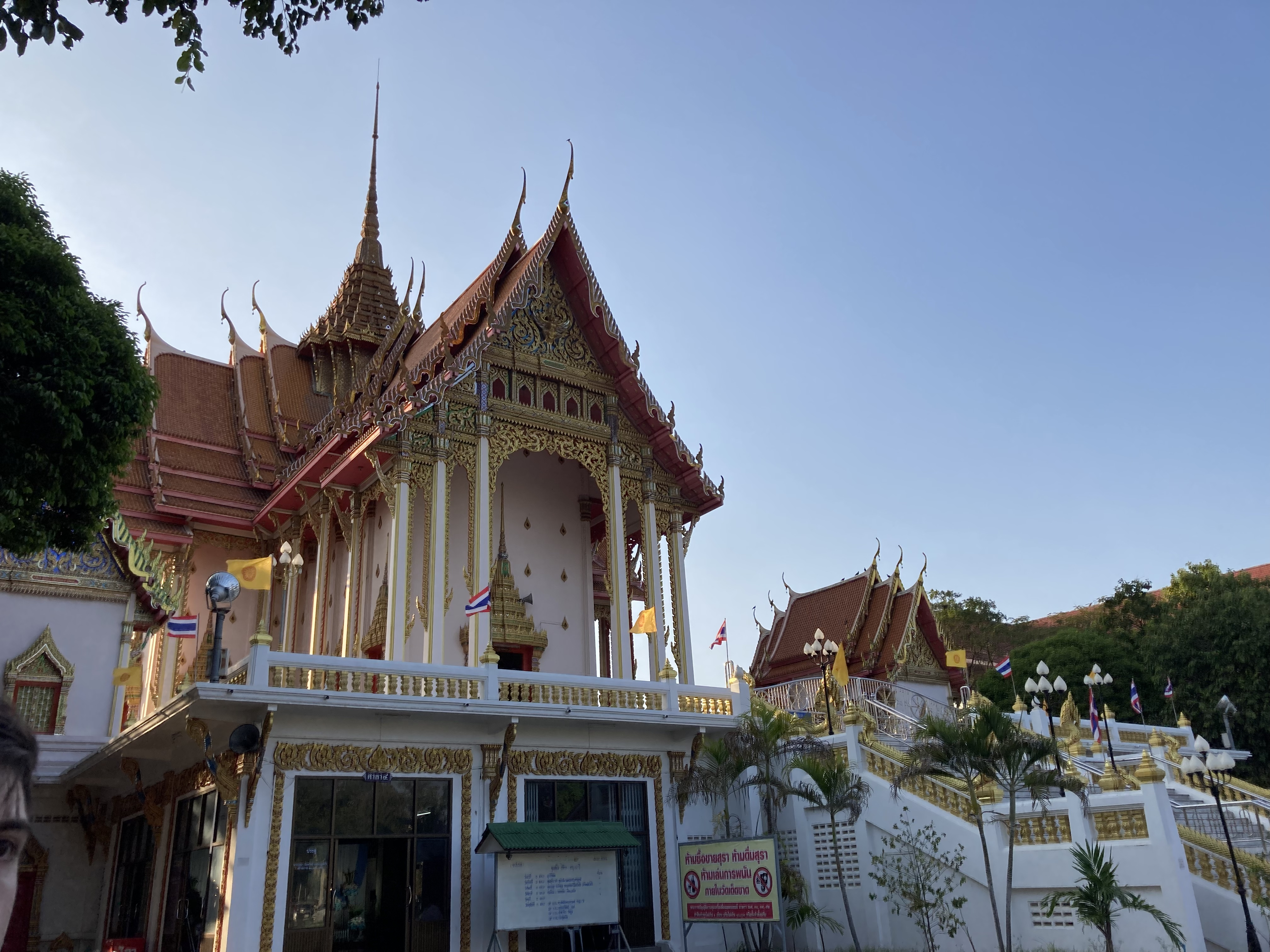
Wat Don Tum (Buddhist temple and monastery)

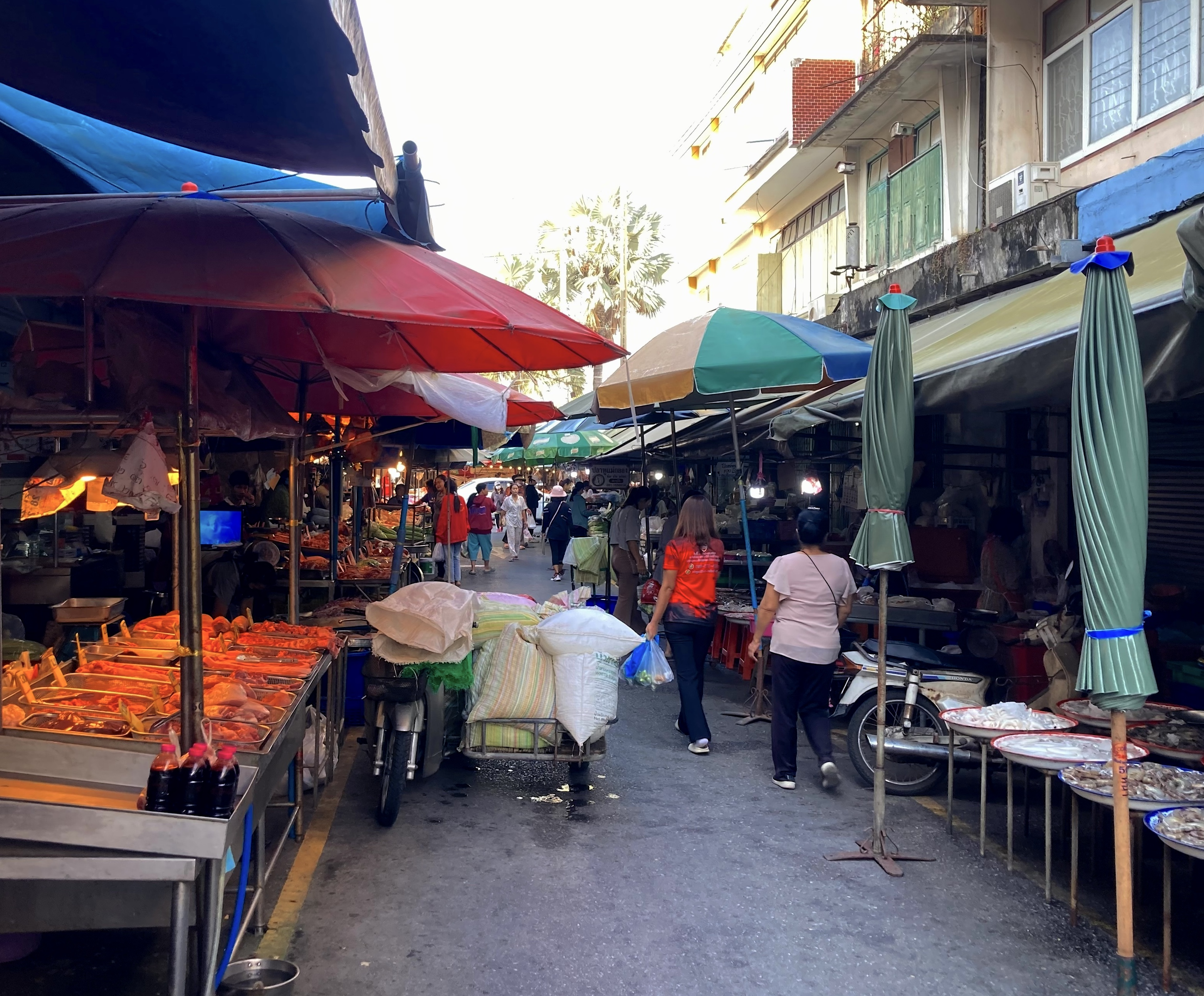
Wet market in central Bang Pong

The town was first officially registered as a sanitary district in 1916, after it was moved down the Mae Klong River from the old town, which is now part of Tha Pha municipality. The new town, when it was first built, was flooded with Chinese immigrants migrating from southern China where drought had occurred for four consecutive years in the 1920s. During the Second World War, the town experienced an economic boom due to its location being a hub between Bangkok to the east, Kanchanaburi to the north, and all the provinces in the south of Thailand. All goods transported by rail from Bangkok, Kanchanaburi, Burma and the southern provinces had to make a stop in Ban Pong.

In 1935, the sanitary district was upgraded to town status (thesaban mueang).

During the Second World War, the town was used by Japanese Forces as a base in the region while they were connecting the railway between Burma and Thailand, with train services running between Ban Pong and Mawlamyine in Burma during and for a few years after the war. The transit Camp Nong Pladuk was located about five kilometres from the railway station.

In the 1960s, the town again experienced an economic boom when several sugar refineries opened up in the area. Many large banking and governmental institutions sited their regional branches in Ban Pong.

== Economy ==
In the district there are more than 400 factories, producing everything from jewellery to car parts to noodles. Hence, the town centre remains vibrant and prosperous. In recent years shopping at the town centre has experienced a decline in its importance owing to the opening of large shopping malls on the town's outskirts.

== See also ==
- Ban Pong railway station
