= Ban Pong district =

Ban Pong บ้านโป่ง
- District
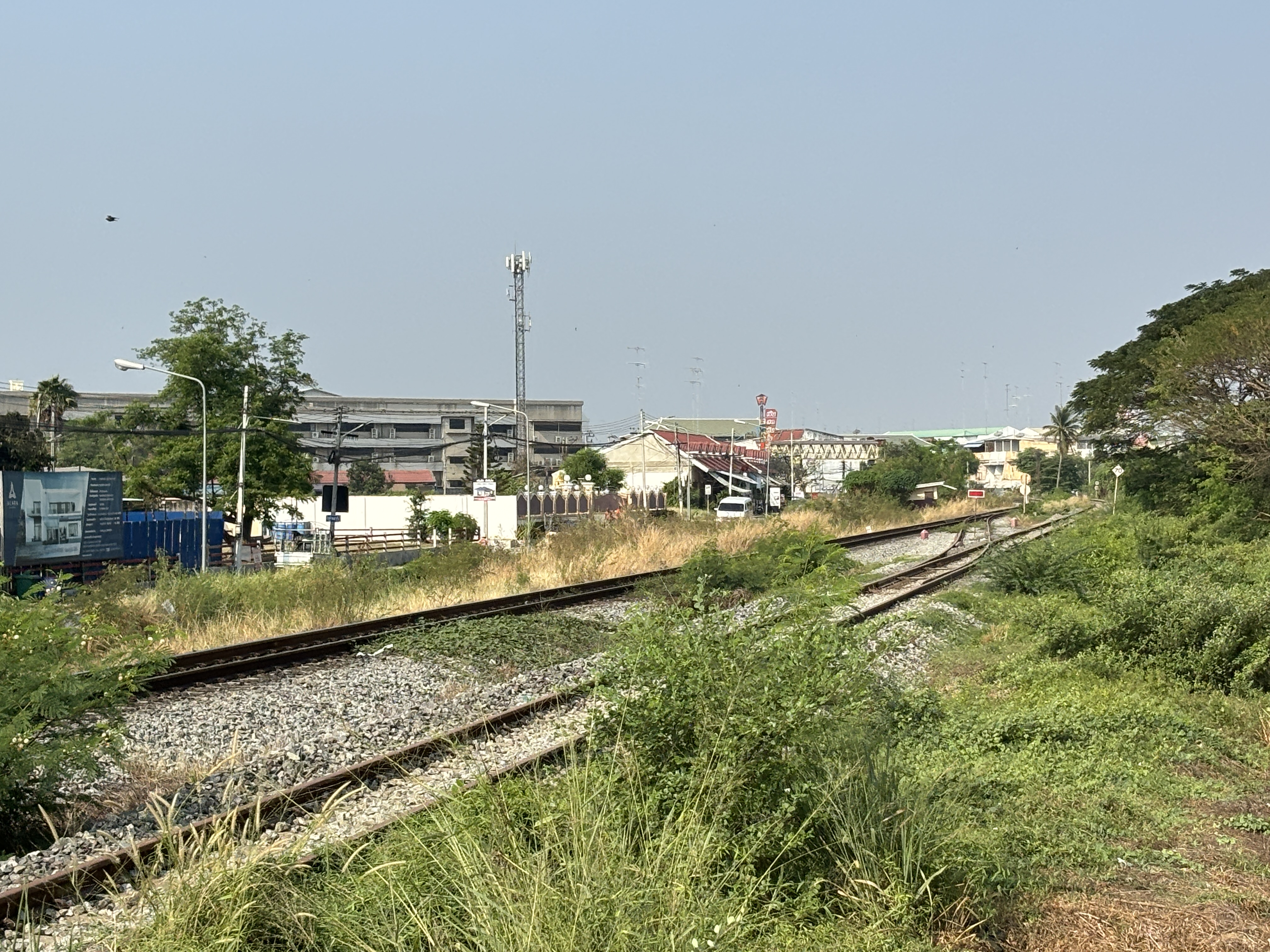
- Southern railway and Burma railway separated at Bang Pong's Nong Pladuk Junction railway station

- District location in Ratchaburi province
- Coordinates: 13°48′51″N 99°52′16″E
- Country: Thailand
- Province: Ratchaburi

Area
  - Total: 366.6 km^{2} (141.5 sq mi)

Population (2017)
  - Total: 172,752
  - Density: 471.22/km^{2} (1,220.5/sq mi)
- Time zone: UTC+7 (ICT)
- Postal code: 70110
- Geocode: 7005

Ban Pong (Thai: บ้านโป่ง, pronounced [bâːn pòːŋ]) is a district (amphoe) of Ratchaburi province, Thailand. It is in the northeast of the province.

== Geography ==
Neighbouring districts are (from the north clockwise) Tha Muang and Tha Maka of Kanchanaburi province, Kamphaeng Saen and Mueang Nakhon Pathom of Nakhon Pathom province and Photharam of Ratchaburi province.

Ban Pong district is hilly in the western part of the district, while the eastern part is a floodplain with the Mae Klong River running through the city centre, connecting the city to the Gulf of Thailand.

== History ==
The district holds an ancient town at Sa Kosi Narai, also called Mueang Kosinarai, which the site signage names Śamvūkapaṭṭana after one of the cities named in the Preah Khan inscription of 1191; Walailak Songsiri reports that identification as one made by scholars rather than endorsing it. The Ban Pong placement has a chain behind it. George Cœdès, noting the name Cāmbūka on a Dvaravati-style Buddha recovered at Lopburi, went no further than the Menam valley; Phōngsi Wanasin and Thiwa Supcanya located it at Ban Pong under code no. 10.2 of their survey, following M. C. Subhadradis Diskul, who in 1966 quoted Tri Amatyakul's proposal without endorsing it and printed a plan of the supposed site. A radiating Avalokiteśvara image from the site is one of a group, with others from Mueang Sing and Lopburi, that she takes to be Angkorian work or the work of court-trained craftsmen rather than local casting.

The Mon people settled in the Ban Pong area about four centuries ago. The Mon communities have maintained some of their traditions and have built their own Buddhist temples.

Later the town attracted numerous Chinese immigrants. Also many Lao Wiang communities settled in the Nong Kop subdistrict of rural Ban Pong.

Two great fires occurred in Ban Pong, razing the town centre: one in 1936 and the other in 1954. The town was rebuilt in the square-grid design then fashionable, with a fountain to the south and a clock tower to the north.

== Camp Nong Pladuk ==
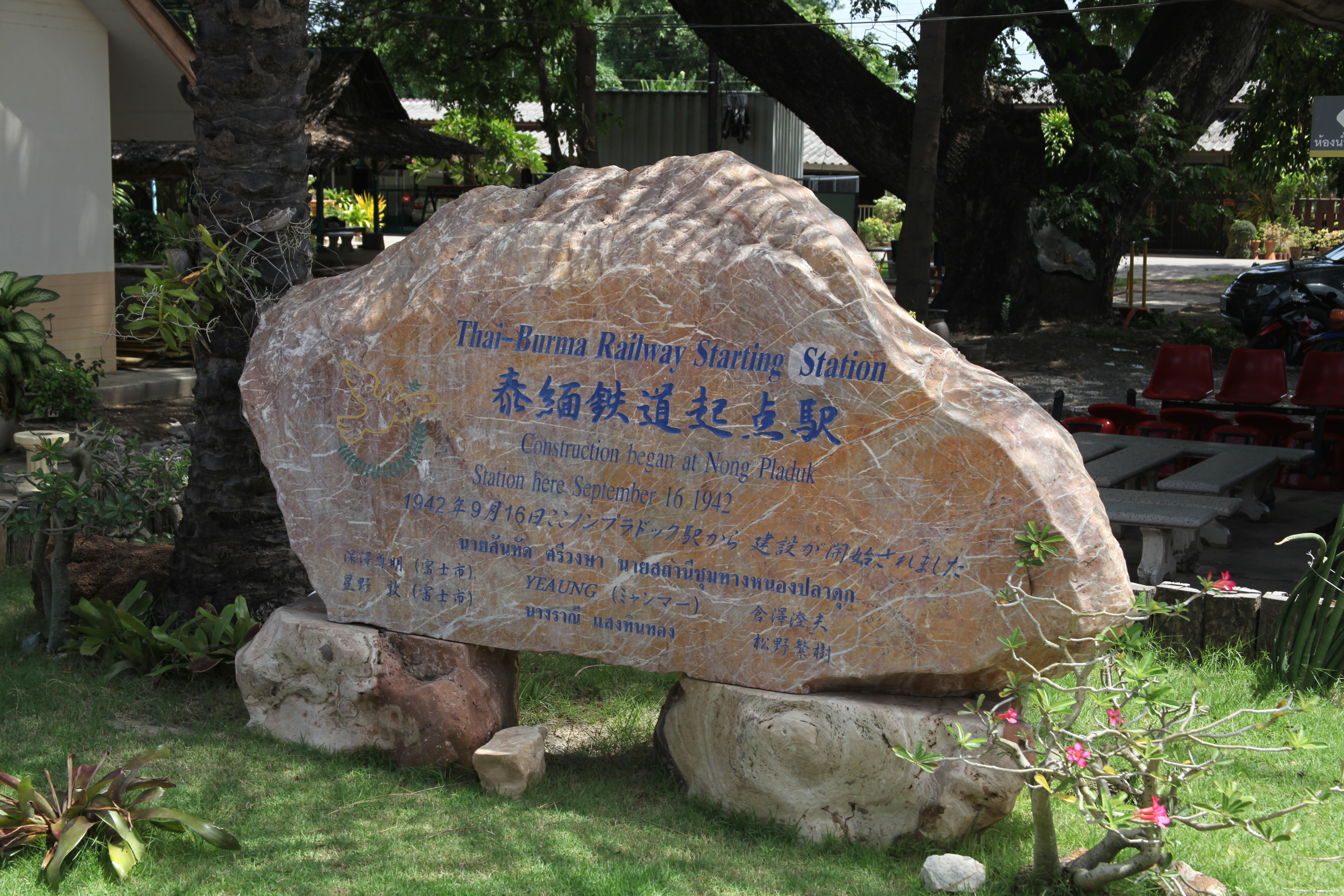
Memorial stone at Nong Pladuk as the starting point of the Burma Railway

During the Japanese-directed construction of the Burma Railway in World War II Nong Pladuk was the site of one of the Japanese POW camps where numerous British, Dutch and allied troops arrived.

Camp Nong Pladuk was initially used as a transit camp from where the prisoners were transported or had to walk to work camps along the Burma Railway. Later Nong Pladuk was used a revalidation camp. During World War II, 23,289 British, 12,329 Dutch, 4,708 Australian, 482 American, and 7,030 undetermined soldiers passed through Camp Nong Pladuk.

== Economy ==
As a result of high investment and fast economic development in the past decades, the town stands as one with the highest GDP per capita in western Thailand, well above national average. It is also experiencing de-industrialisation of labour-intensive industries such as canning and sugar refining. There is a large abandoned canning factory in Ban Pong town. The town is now experiencing a boom in more highly skilled industries such as auto parts, petrochemical, and food industries, with more than 70 percent of Thai buses and coaches manufactured in Ban Pong. The biggest paper making complex in Thailand lies north of the town.

As of June 2014, the National Statistics Bureau reported Ban Pong's annual GDP per capita (nominal) at US$9,623 and its annual GDP per capita (PPP) at US$24,000 compared with Thailand's US$5,675 and US$14,136 respectively.

Ban Pong is also the centre of a large pet market especially ornamental fish. There are more than 20,000 fish culture farmers, which is also the largest in southeast Asia.

== Sights ==
West of the town Ban Pong is Wat Muang, a centre of the Mon community. There is also a large Roman Catholic church building and a large Buddhist temple.

== Administration ==
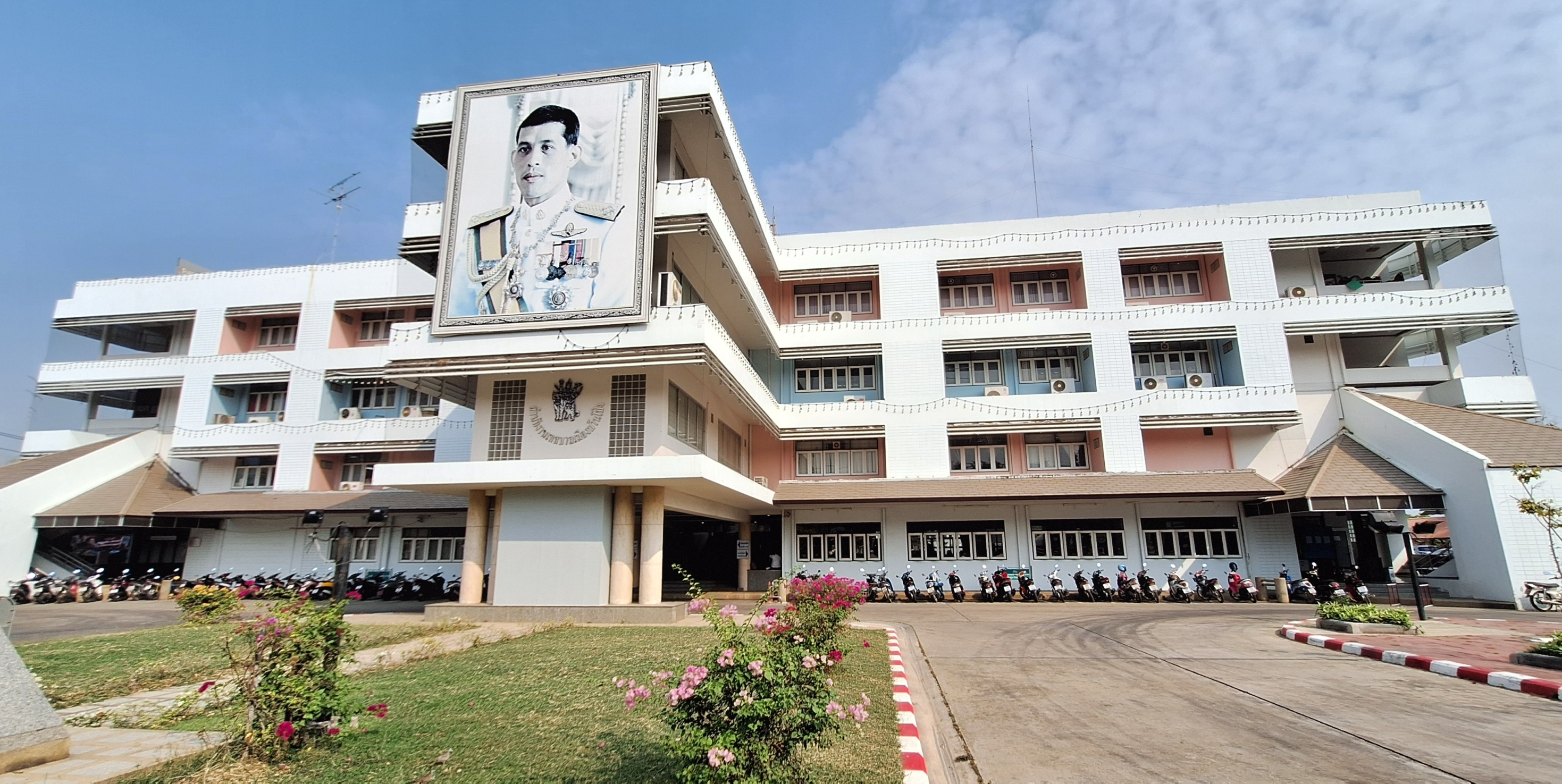
Banpong Municipality Office Building

The district is divided into 15 sub-districts (tambons), which are further subdivided into 182 villages (mubans). Ban Pong itself is a town (thesaban mueang) which encompasses tambon Ban Pong. Another town in the district is Tha Pha (Thai: เทศบาลเมืองท่าผา) whose administrative area covers the entire subdistrict Tha Pha and parts of Pak Raet.

There are a further four townships (thesaban tambons) including:

1. Krachap (Thai: เทศบาลตำบลกระจับ) covers parts of Nong O and Don Krabueang

2. Huai Krabok (Thai: เทศบาลตำบลห้วยกระบอก) covers parts of Krap Yai

3. Krap Yai (Thai: เทศบาลตำบลกรับใหญ่)

4. Boek Phrai (Thai: เทศบาลตำบลเบิกไพร)

and 14 other tambon administrative organizations (TAO) responsible for the non-municipal areas.

No.	Name	Thai name
1.	Ban Pong	บ้านโป่ง	9.	Nakhon Chum	นครชุมน์
2.	Tha Pha	ท่าผา	10.	Ban Muang	บ้านม่วง
3.	Krap Yai	กรับใหญ่	11.	Khung Phayom	คุ้งพยอม
4.	Pak Raet	ปากแรต	12.	Nong Pla Mo	หนองปลาหมอ
5.	Nong Kop	หนองกบ	13.	Khao Khlung	เขาขลุง
6.	Nong O	หนองอ้อ	14.	Boek Phrai	เบิกไพร
7.	Don Krabueang	ดอนกระเบื้อง	15.	Lat Bua Khao	ลาดบัวขาว
8.	Suan Kluai	สวนกล้วย

== Health ==
Ban Pong is served by Ban Pong Hospital, a teaching hospital operated by the Ministry of Public Health.

== Transport ==
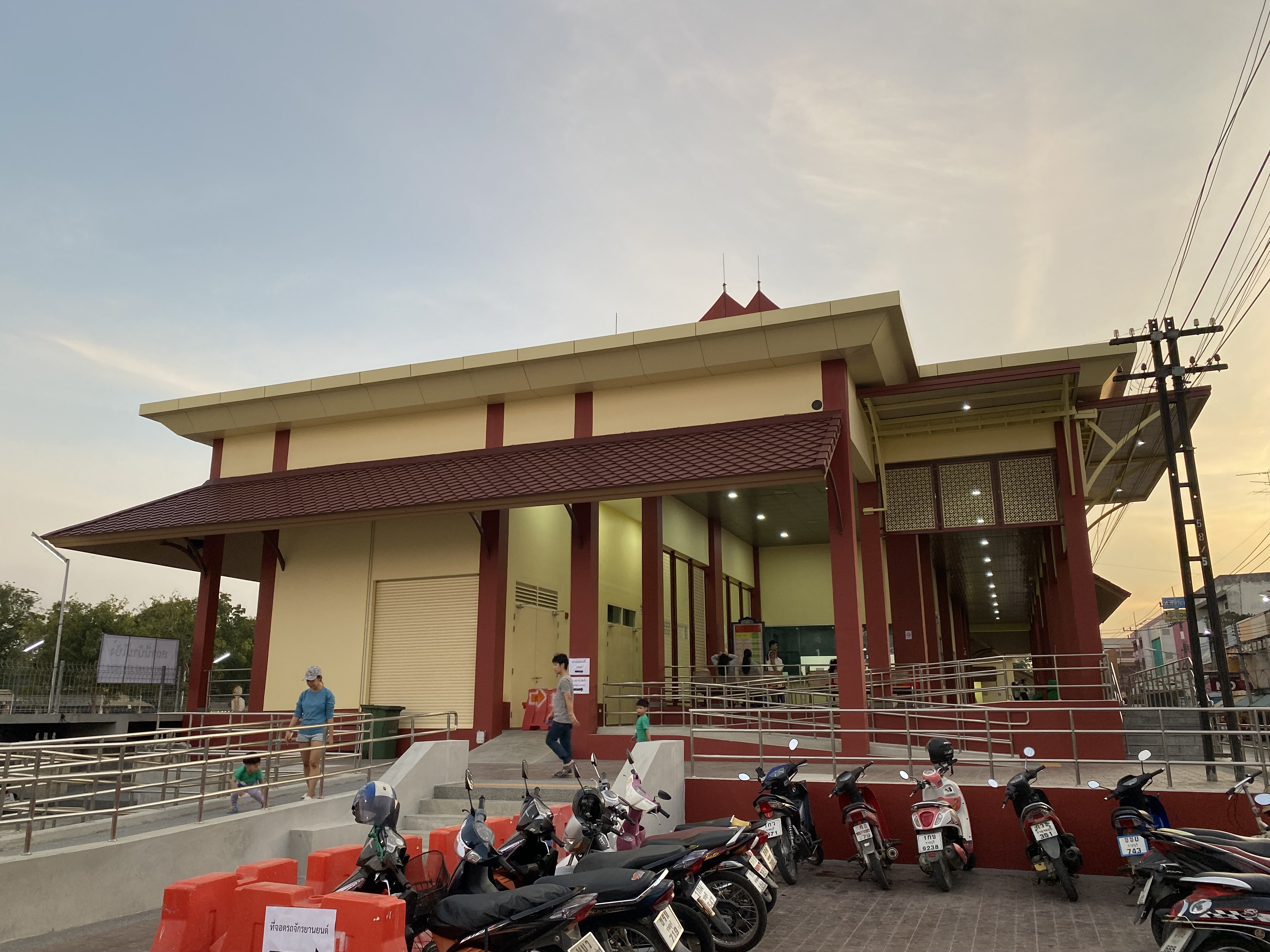
Ban Pong railway station

Nong Pladuk Junction railway station is located in Ban Pong, where the Burma Railway leading to Kanchanaburi (and further to Nam Tok) and Suphanburi Line connects with Suphan Buri province to the north splits from Southern Line leading to Padang Besar (Thai) railway station.

Ban Pong railway station is the main railway station in the district, in Ban Pong town. There are 2 other railway stations in the district:

- Khlong Bang Tan Railway Station
- Nakhon Chum Railway Station
