= Chiang Mai Main Line =

Railway line in Thailand

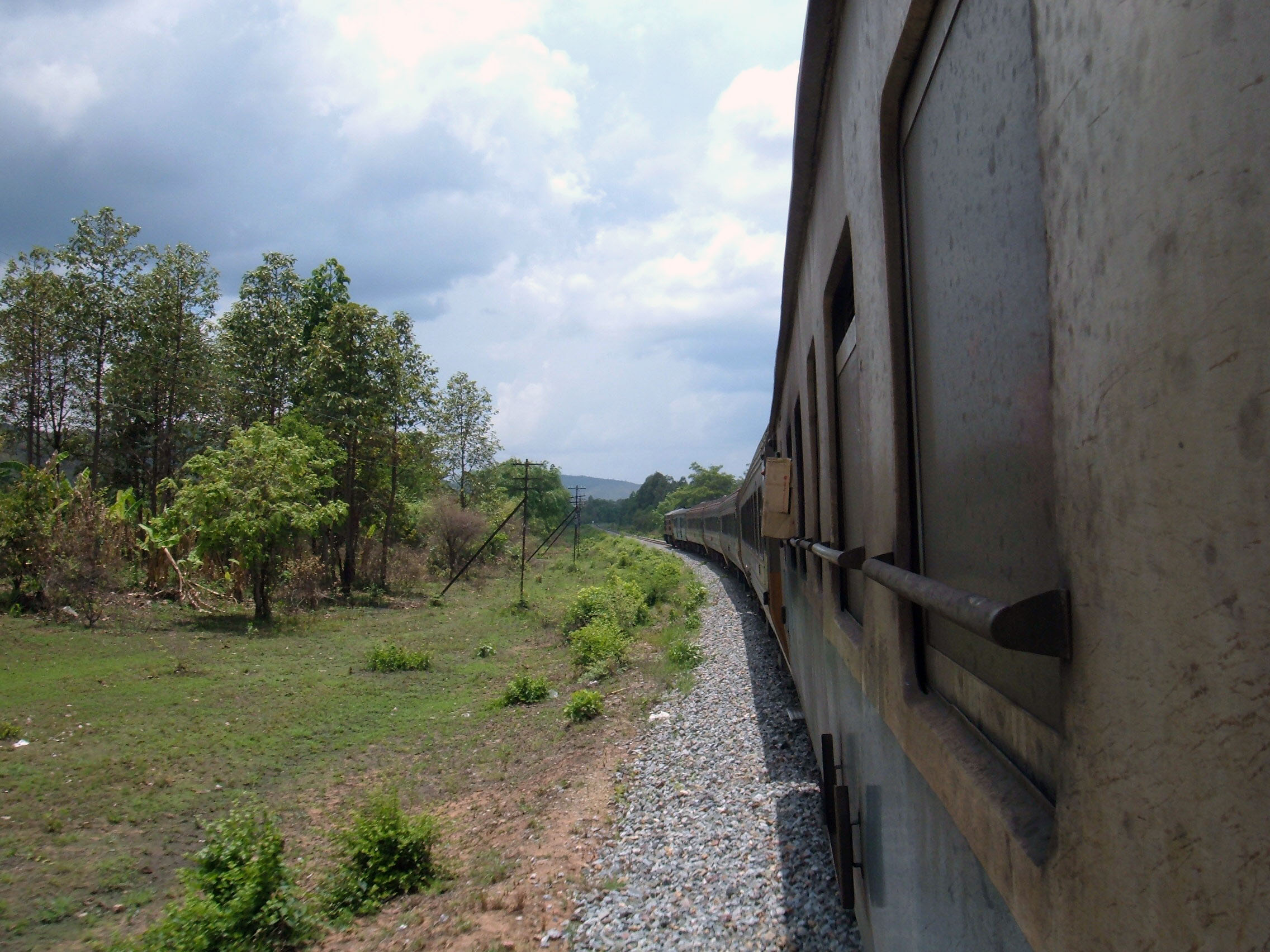
- Train bound to Chiang Mai. Taken on 9 May 2007

Overview
- Status: Operational
- Owner: State Railway of Thailand
- Locale: Bangkok; Pathum Thani Province; Phra Nakhon Si Ayutthaya Province; Lopburi Province; Nakhon Sawan Province; Phichit Province; Phitsanulok Province; Uttaradit Province; Phrae Province; Lampang Province; Lamphun Province; Chiang Mai Province
- Termini: Hua Lamphong; Chiang Mai
- Stations: 126

Service
- Type: Inter-city rail
- System: Northern Line
- Operator(s): State Railway of Thailand
- Depot(s): Bang Sue Depot; Pak Nam Pho Depot; Uttaradit Depot; Lampang Depot; Chiang Mai Depot

History
- Opened: 26 March 1896

Technical
- Line length: 751.42 km (466.91 mi)
- Number of tracks: 1
- Track gauge: 1,000 mm (3 ft 3 3/8 in) metre gauge

Chiang Mai Main Line is a main line of the Northern Line operated by State Railway of Thailand that connects between Hua Lamphong railway station in the central and Chiang Mai railway station in the north, passing through many provinces. It is the second longest railway line in Thailand, after Su-ngai Kolok Main Line. Notable services include the Nakhon Phing Express, the first class train serving the line. Many accidents have occurred on the line in recent years, prompting renovation work to commence on the track in late 2013, finally reopening on 2 December 2013.

== History ==
=== Timeline ===
No.	Segment	Year opened
1	Ban Phachi Junction–Lopburi	1901
2	Lopburi–Pak Nam Pho	1905
3	Pak Nam Pho–Phitsanulok	1907
4	Phitsanulok–Ban Dara Junction	1908
5	Ban Dara Junction–Pang Ton Phueng	1909
6	Pang Ton Phueng–Mae Phuak Halt	1911
7	Mae Phuak–Pak Pan	1912
8	Pak Pan–Huai Mae Ta	1913
9	Huai Mae Ta–Ban Pin	1914
10	Ban Pin–Pha Kho	1915
11	Pha Kho–Mae Chang	1915
12	Mae Chang–Nakhon Lampang	1916
13	Nakhon Lampang–Pang Hua Phong	1916
14	Pang Hua Phong–Pang Yang	1918
15	Pang Yang–Chiang Mai	1926
16	Ban Klap–Khok Kathiam (Lopburi Bypass Line)	2025

=== Name changes ===
Name	Old name	Year changed
Ayutthaya	Krung Kao	Rama VI period
Nakhon Sawan	Nong Pling	—N/a
Phrom Phiram	Ban Krab Phuang	—N/a
Tron	Wang Hin	—N/a
Saraphi	Pa Yang Loeng	1961

== Services ==
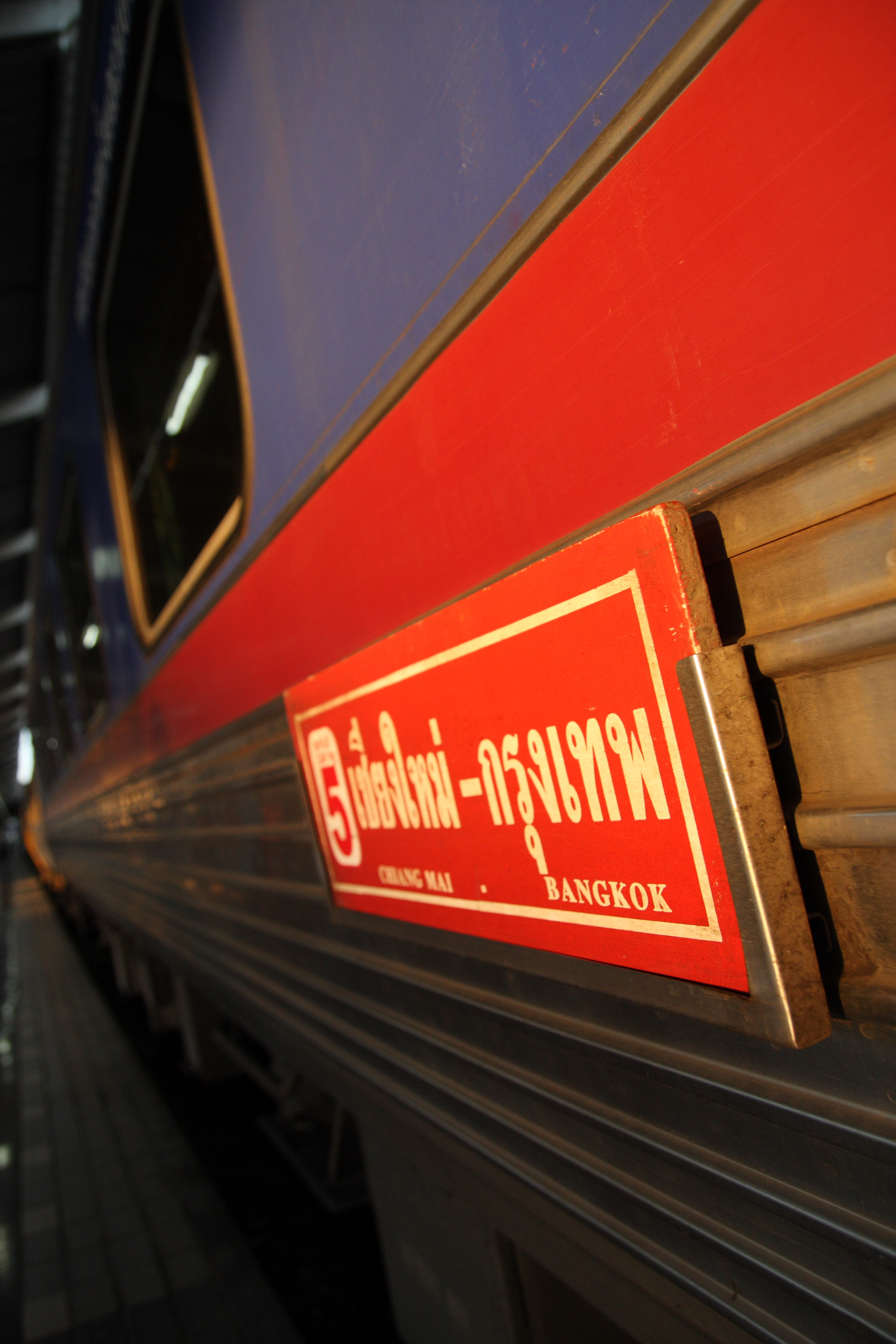
Nakhon Phing Express at Chiang Mai Railway Station

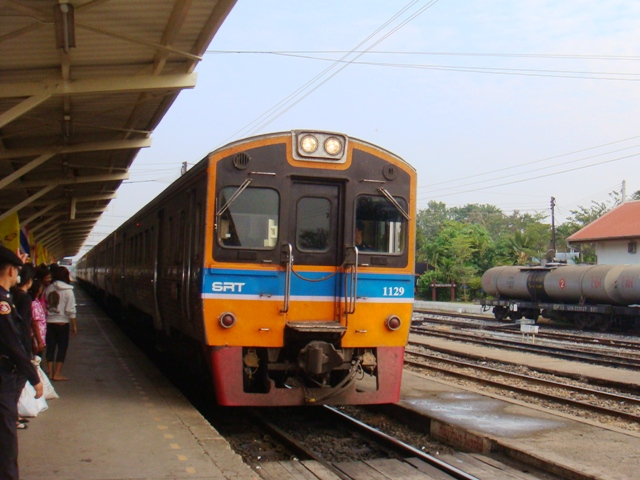
Rapid train no.106 at Phitsanulok Railway Station

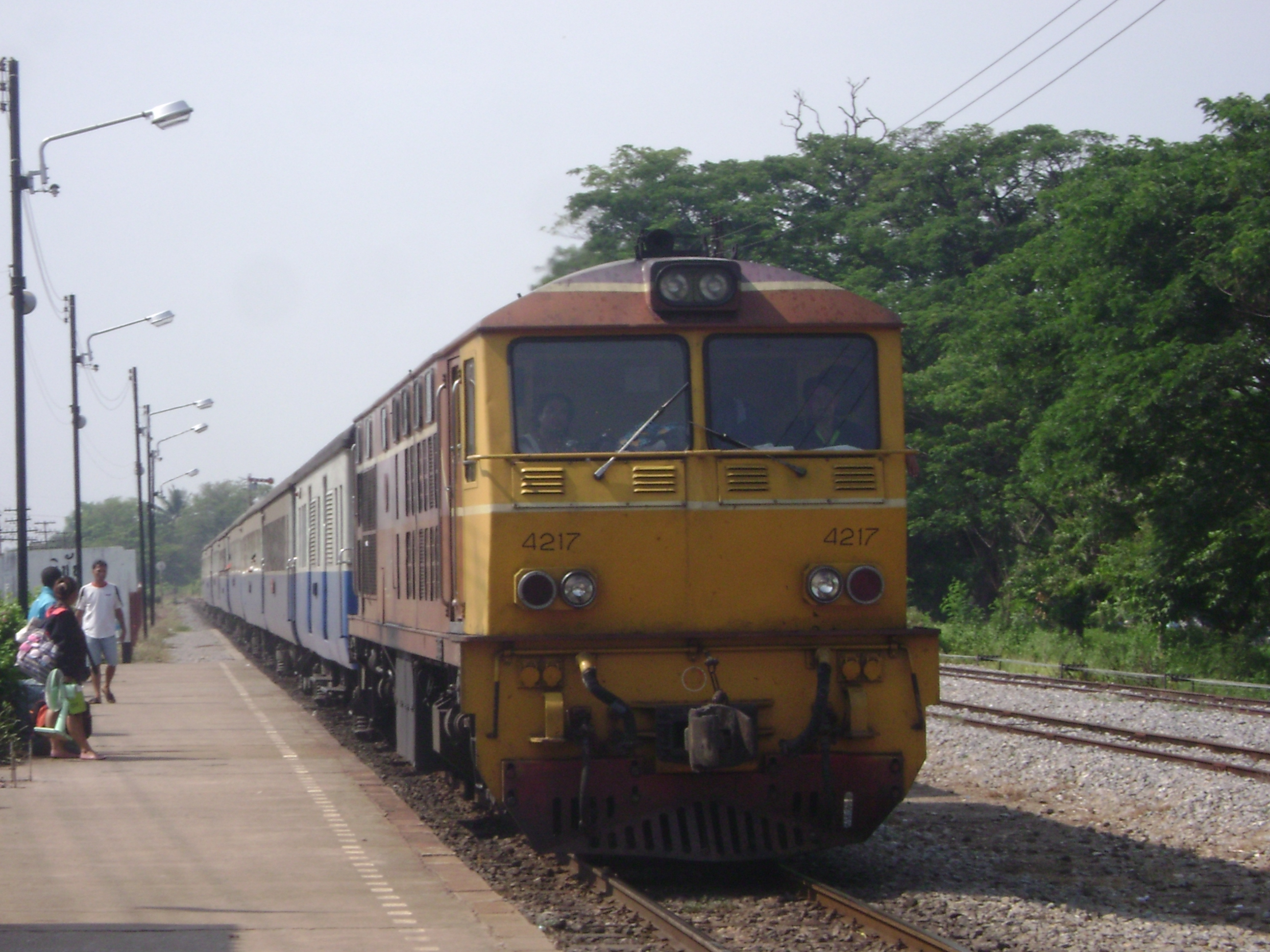
Rapid train no.112 at Phichai Railway Station

Train no.	Type	Termini	
3	Special Express	ฺBangkok-Krung Thep Apiwat	Sawankhalok
4	Special Express	Sawankhalok/Sila At	Krung Thep Apiwat
7	Special Express	Krung Thep Apiwat	Chiang Mai
8	Special Express	Chiang Mai	Krung Thep Apiwat
9 (Utrawithi)	Special Express	Krung Thep Apiwat	Chiang Mai
10 (Utrawithi)	Special Express	Chiang Mai	Krung Thep Apiwat
13	Special Express	Krung Thep Apiwat	Chiang Mai
14	Special Express	Chiang Mai	Krung Thep Apiwat
51	Express	Krung Thep Apiwat	Chiang Mai
52	Express	Chiang Mai	Krung Thep Apiwat
102	Rapid	Chiang Mai	Krung Thep Apiwat
105	Rapid	Krung Thep Apiwat	Sila At
106	Rapid	Sila At	Krung Thep Apiwat
107	Rapid	Krung Thep Apiwat	Den Chai
108	Rapid	Den Chai	Krung Thep Apiwat
109	Rapid	Krung Thep Apiwat	Chiang Mai
111	Rapid	Krung Thep Apiwat	Den Chai
112	Rapid	Den Chai	Krung Thep Apiwat
201	Ordinary	ฺBangkok-Hua Lamphong	Phitsanulok
202	Ordinary	Phitsanulok	Hua Lamphong
207	Ordinary	Hua Lamphong	Nakhon Sawan
208	Ordinary	Nakhon Sawan	Hua Lamphong
209	Ordinary	Hua Lamphong	Ban Takhli
210	Ordinary	Ban Takhli	Hua Lamphong
211	Ordinary	Hua Lamphong	Taphan Hin
212	Ordinary	Taphan Hin	Hua Lamphong
301	Commuter	Hua Lamphong	Lop Buri
302	Commuter	Lop Buri	Hua Lamphong
303	Commuter	Hua Lamphong	Lop Buri
304	Commuter	Lop Buri	Hua Lamphong
311	Commuter	Hua Lamphong	Rangsit
313	Commuter	Hua Lamphong	Ban Phachi
314	Commuter	Ban Phachi	Hua Lamphong
317	Commuter	Hua Lamphong	Lop Buri
318	Commuter	Lop Buri	Hua Lamphong
401	Local	Lop Buri	Phitsanulok
402	Local	Phitsanulok	Lop Buri
403	Local	Phitsanulok	Sila At
407	Local	Nakhon Sawan	Chiang Mai
408	Local	Chiang Mai	Nakhon Sawan
409	Local	Ayutthaya	Lop Buri
410	Local	Sila At	Phitsanulok

== Notable railway stations ==
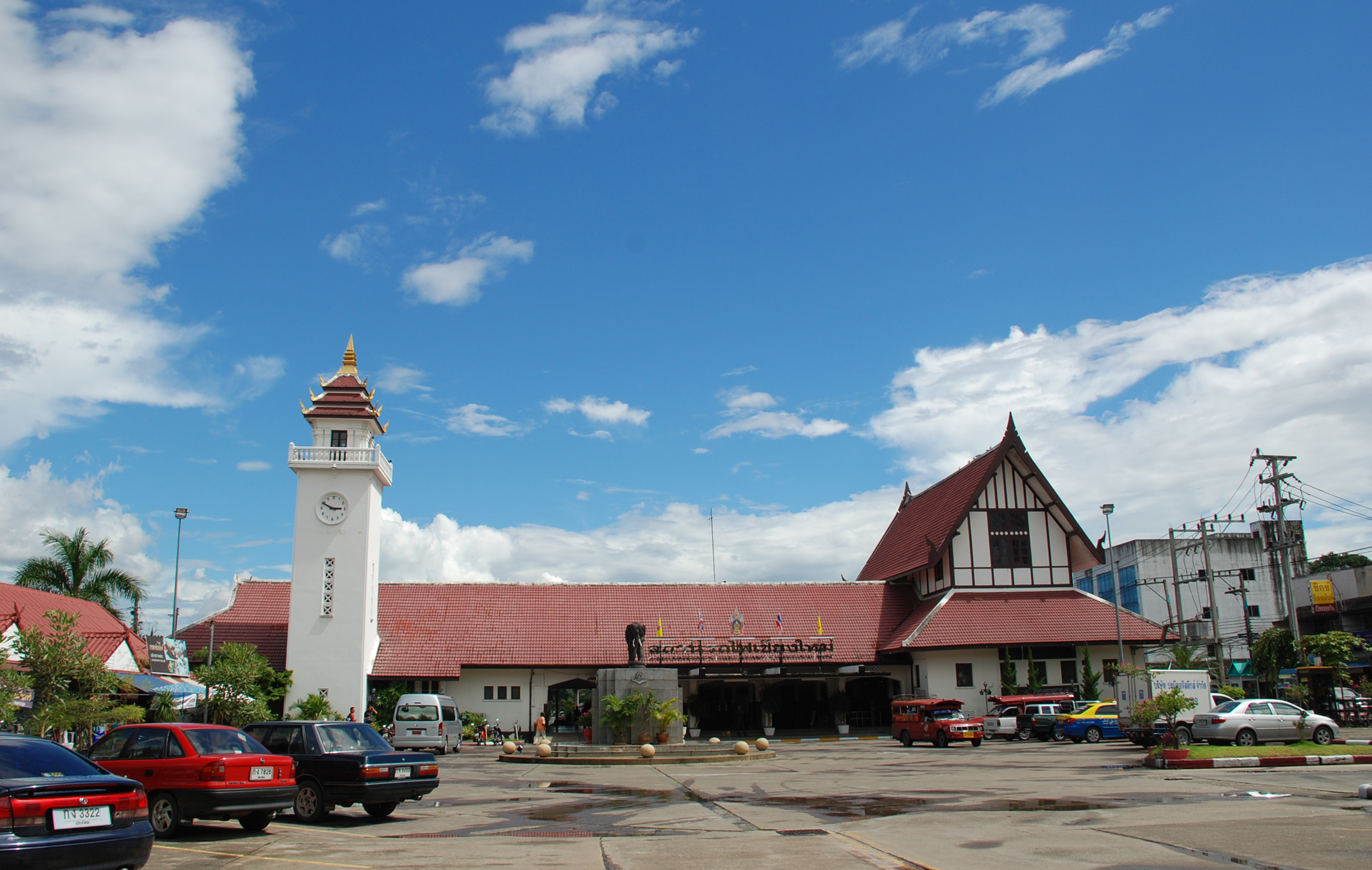
Chiang Mai railway station

- Bang Sue Junction - The largest freight yard in Thailand and hence the Phahonyothin main freight terminal. There is also a locomotive depot.
- Ayutthaya station - Northern Bangkok suburban station. High passenger revenue, second only to Bangkok station.
- Ban Phachi Junction - A major junction, where the Northern and Northeastern lines separate.
- Lop Buri Station - The end of northern Bangkok suburban service; a historic military town.
- Nakhon Sawan Station - Nakhon Sawan Main Station, Nong Pling station until 1956.
- Phichit Station- Phichit Main Station
- Phitsanulok Station - Phitsanulok Main station, town with the famous Phra Phuttha Chinnarat
- Ban Dara Junction - Junction for Sawankhalok Line
- Uttaradit Station - Main station for Uttaradit Province.
- Sila At Station - Depot on the Northern Line. Refueling station and up trains will be cut at this station
- Den Chai Station - the dropping point for Phrae with a proposal for a junction for Den Chai-Chiang Rai route
- Nakhon Lampang Station - Depot on the Northern Line. Train will be cut further if going North to Chiang Mai.
- Khun Tan Station - Station in the mountains, base point and entrance for Doi Khuntan National Park. Railway bungalows also situated here
- Lamphun Station - Main station for Lamphun Province
- Chiang Mai station - Terminus

== See also ==
- Sawankhalok Line
