= Ban Khon railway station =

Railway station in Thailand

Coordinates: 17.1995°N 100.0792°E

Ban Khon บ้านโคน

General information
- Location: Ban Khon Subdistrict, Phichai District, Uttaradit
- Owner: State Railway of Thailand
- Line: Northern Line
- Platforms: 1
- Tracks: 2

Other information
- Station code: บค.

Services
| Preceding station | State Railway of Thailand | Following station |
|---|---|---|
| Ban Bung towards Hua Lamphong or Krung Thep Aphiwat | Northern Line | Phichai towards Chiang Mai |
Location

Ban Khon railway station is a railway station located in Ban Khon Subdistrict, Phichai District, Uttaradit. It is located 437.410 km from Bangkok railway station and is a class 3 railway station. It is on the Northern Line of the State Railway of Thailand.
