= Wang Kaphi railway station =

Railway station in Northern Thailand

Coordinates: 17.5446°N 100.1003°E

Wang Kaphi วังกะพี้

General information
- Location: Wang Kaphi Subdistrict, Uttaradit City
- Owner: State Railway of Thailand
- Line: Northern Line
- Platforms: 1
- Tracks: 3

Other information
- Station code: วก.

Services
| Preceding station | State Railway of Thailand | Following station |
|---|---|---|
| Tron towards Hua Lamphong or Krung Thep Aphiwat | Northern Line | Uttaradit towards Chiang Mai |
Location

Wang Kaphi railway station is a railway station located in Wang Kaphi Subdistrict, Uttaradit City, Uttaradit. It is located 476.822 km from Bangkok railway station and is a class 3 railway station. It is on the Northern Line of the State Railway of Thailand.
