= Phichai railway station =

Rail station in Uttaradit, Thailand

Coordinates: 17.2892°N 100.0880°E

Phichai พิชัย
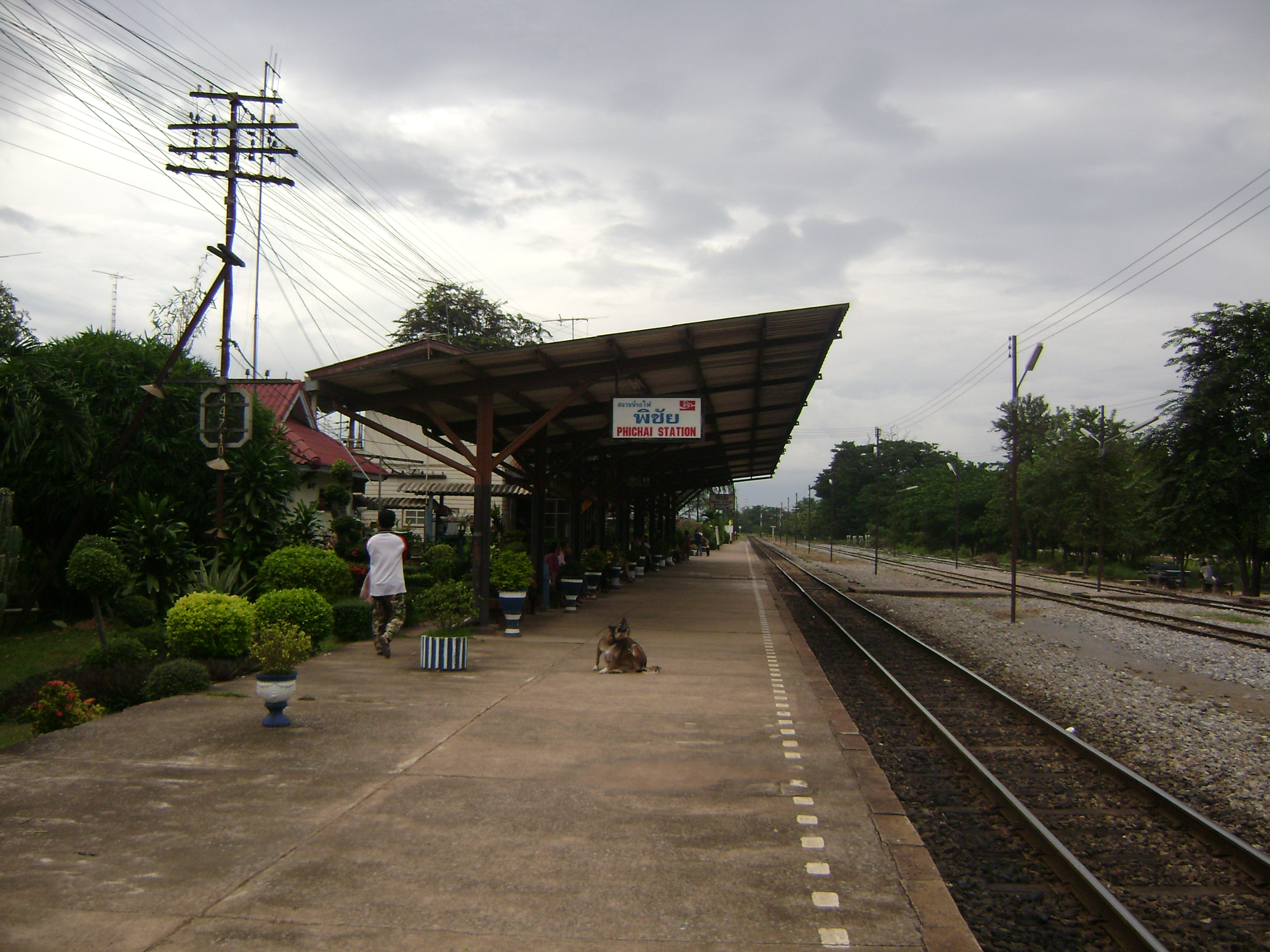

General information
- Location: Mu 3 (Ban Nai Mueang), Nai Mueang Subdistrict, Phichai District, Uttaradit
- Owner: State Railway of Thailand
- Line: Northern Line
- Platforms: 1
- Tracks: 3

Other information
- Station code: พย.

History
- Opened: 11 November 1908; 117 years ago

Services
Preceding station	State Railway of Thailand	Following station
Ban Khon towards Hua Lamphong or Krung Thep Aphiwat	Northern Line	Rai Oi towards Chiang Mai
Location

Phichai railway station is a railway station located in Nai Mueang Subdistrict, Phichai District, Uttaradit. It is located 447.553 km (278.097 mi) from Bangkok railway station and is a class 2 railway station. It is on the Northern Line of the State Railway of Thailand. Phichai railway station opened as part of the Northern Line extension from Phitsanulok to Ban Dara Junction in November 1908.

There is also a specialty menu at this station that is recommended for those who pass by train. That is the "Kaeng khua hoi khom" (Thai: แกงคั่วหอยขม), a Thai curry with river snails over rice on a banana leaf container sold by hawkers with trays walking along platforms. It is regarded as the signature food of the locality. Because Phichai is a district surrounded by mountains and rivers, it is a place rich in food ingredients.
