= Tha Sak railway station =

Railway station in Thailand

Coordinates: 17.4113°N 100.0977°E

Tha Sak ท่าสัก
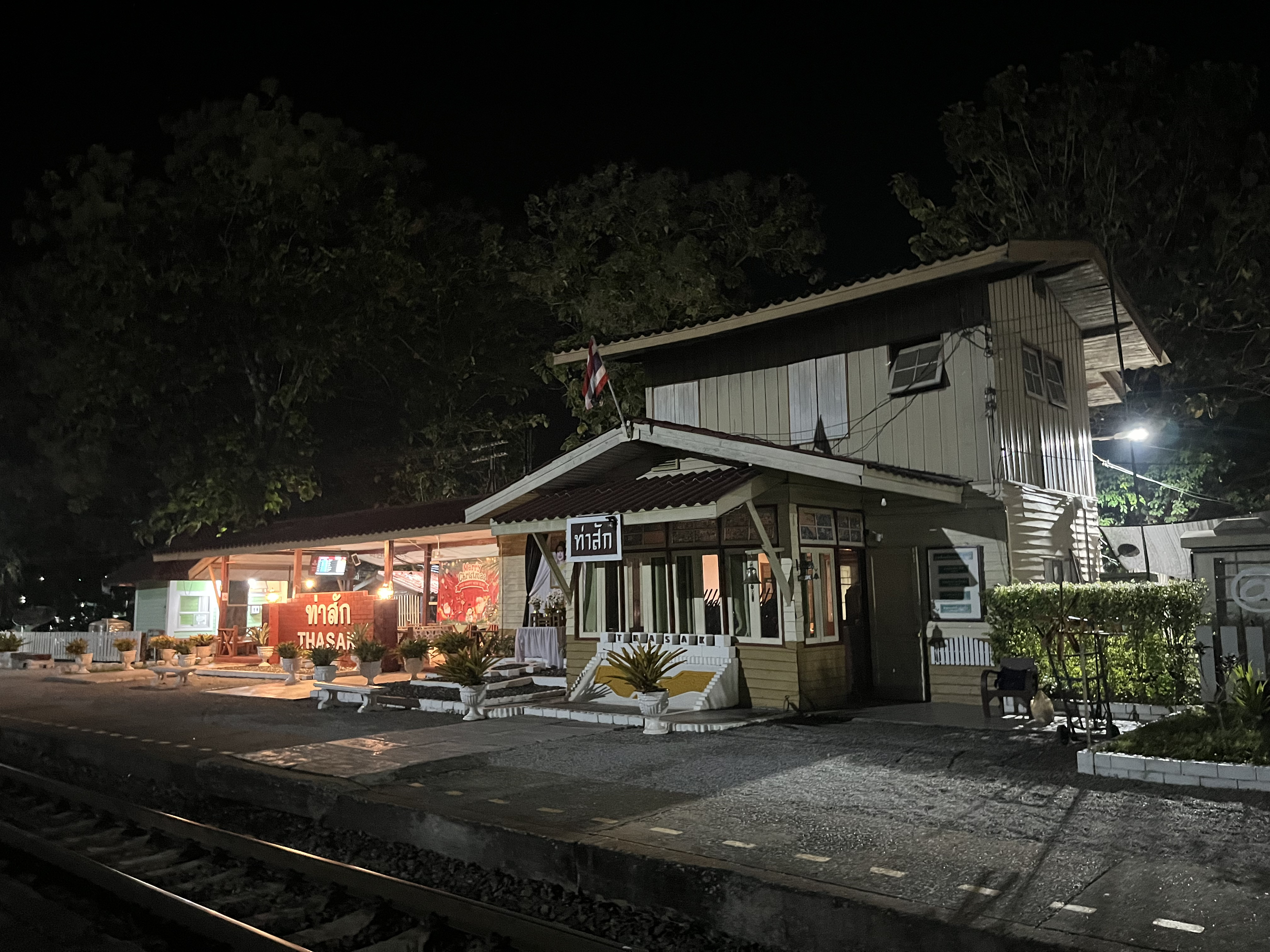
- Station in 2026

General information
- Location: Mu 1 (Ban Tha Sak), Tha Sak Subdistrict, Phichai District, Uttaradit
- Owner: State Railway of Thailand
- Line: Northern Line
- Platforms: 1
- Tracks: 3

Other information
- Station code: าส.

Services
Preceding station	State Railway of Thailand	Following station
Ban Dara Junction towards Hua Lamphong or Krung Thep Aphiwat	Northern Line	Tron towards Chiang Mai
Location

Tha Sak railway station is a railway station located in Tha Sak Subdistrict, Phichai District, Uttaradit. It is located 461.802 km from Bangkok railway station and is a class 2 railway station. It is on the Northern Line of the State Railway of Thailand.
