= Tha Chomphu railway station =

Railway station in Thailand

Coordinates: 18.5065°N 99.2056°E

Tha Chomphu ทาชมภู
- Station in 2026

General information
- Location: Tha Pladuk Subdistrict, Mae Tha District, Lamphun
- Owner: State Railway of Thailand
- Line: Northern Line
- Platforms: 1
- Tracks: 3

Other information
- Station code: าช.

Services
Preceding station	State Railway of Thailand	Following station
Khun Tan towards Hua Lamphong or Krung Thep Aphiwat	Northern Line	Sala Mae Tha towards Chiang Mai
Location

Tha Chomphu railway station is a railway station located in Tha Pladuk Subdistrict, Mae Tha District, Lamphun. It is a class 3 railway station located 691.898 km (429.9 mi) from Bangkok railway station. The station is the railway station closest to Tha Chomphu Bridge, or also known as the "White Bridge" as it was built of white concrete.

== Gallery ==
Station building
