= Sala Mae Tha railway station =

Railway station in Tha Sop Sao, Thailand

Coordinates: 18.4617°N 99.1391°E

Sala Mae Tha ศาลาแม่ทา
- Station in 2026

General information
- Location: Tha Sop Sao Subdistrict, Mae Tha District, Lamphun
- Owner: State Railway of Thailand
- Line: Northern Line
- Platforms: 1
- Tracks: 3

Other information
- Station code: ลท.

Services
Preceding station	State Railway of Thailand	Following station
Tha Chomphu towards Hua Lamphong or Krung Thep Aphiwat	Northern Line	Nong Lom towards Chiang Mai
Location

Sala Mae Tha railway station is a railway station located in Tha Sop Sao Subdistrict, Mae Tha District, Lamphun. It is a class 3 railway station located 700.686 km (435.4 mi) from Bangkok railway station.

== Gallery ==
Station building
