= Pa Sao railway station =

Railway station in Umong, Thailand

Coordinates: 18.6376°N 99.0421°E

Pa Sao ป่าเส้า
- Station in 2026

General information
- Location: Mu 9 (Ban Pa Sao), Umong Subdistrict, Lamphun City
- Owner: State Railway of Thailand
- Line: Northern Line
- Platforms: 1
- Tracks: 3

Other information
- Station code: ปส.

Services
Preceding station	State Railway of Thailand	Following station
Lamphun towards Hua Lamphong or Krung Thep Aphiwat	Northern Line	Saraphi towards Chiang Mai
Location

Pa Sao railway station is a railway station located in Umong Subdistrict, Lamphun City, Lamphun. It is a class 3 railway station located 734.645 km (456.5 mi) from Bangkok railway station.
