= Nong Lom railway station =

Railway station in Si Bua Ban, Thailand

Coordinates: 18.4622°N 99.0570°E

Nong Lom หนองหล่ม
- Station in 2026

General information
- Location: Mu 8 (Ban Nong Lom), Si Bua Ban Subdistrict, Mueang Lamphun District
- Owner: State Railway of Thailand
- Line: Northern Line
- Platforms: 1
- Tracks: 2

Other information
- Station code: งล.

Services
Preceding station	State Railway of Thailand	Following station
Sala Mae Tha towards Hua Lamphong or Krung Thep Aphiwat	Northern Line	Lamphun towards Chiang Mai
Location

Nong Lom railway station is a railway station located in Si Bua Ban Subdistrict, Lamphun City, Lamphun. It is a class 3 railway station located 713.018 km (443.0 mi) from Bangkok railway station.

== Gallery ==
Station building
