= Khlong Maphlap railway station =

Railway station in Thailand

Coordinates: 17.3475°N 99.9833°E

Khlong Maphlap คลองมะพลับ
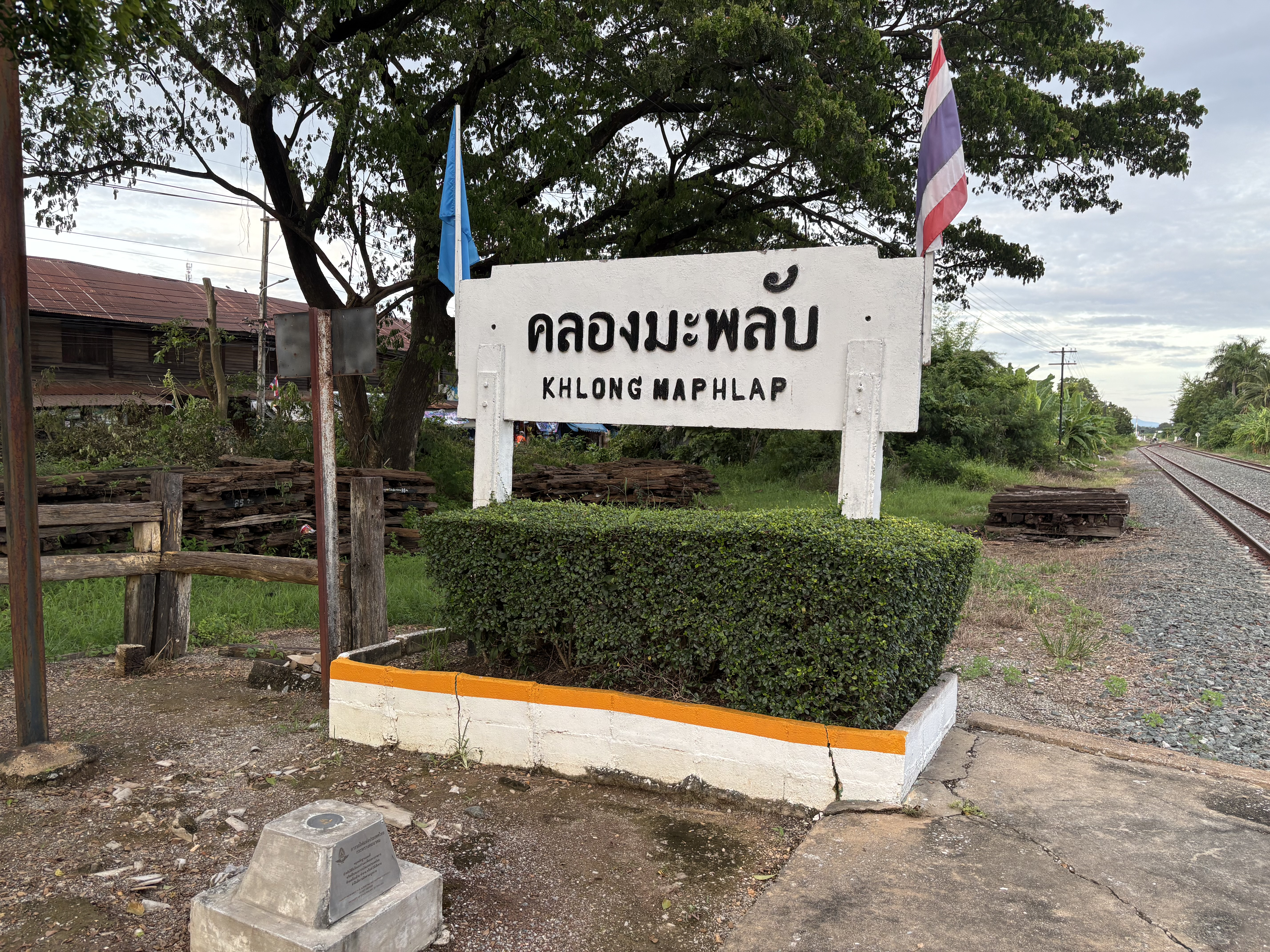

General information
- Location: Si Nakhon Subdistrict, Si Nakhon District; Sukhothai Province; Thailand
- Operator: State Railway of Thailand
- Line: Sawankhalok Line
- Platforms: 1
- Tracks: 2

Construction
- Structure type: At-grade

Other information
- Station code: มป.
- Classification: Class 3

History
- Opened: 15 August 1910; 116 years ago

Services
Preceding station	State Railway of Thailand	Following station
Ban Dara Junction Terminus	Northern Line Sawankhalok Line	Sawankhalok Terminus
Location

Khlong Maphlap Railway Station is a railway station located in Si Nakhon Subdistrict, Si Nakhon District, Sukhothai. It is located 470.273 km from Bangkok railway station and is a class 3 railway station. It is on the Sawankhalok Branch Line of the Northern Line of the State Railway of Thailand. Prior to 2020, a single special express train ran from Bangkok to Sila At with a stopover at Khlong Maphlap.

Between 1 April 2020 and 15 July 2023, the special express service was suspended due to the outbreak of COVID-19 in Thailand. As a result, no train services operated on the entire branch line for over three years. On 15 July 2023, services resumed on the line with a single local train running between Sila At and Sawankhalok.
