= Ban Phachi Junction railway station =

Railway station in Phachi, Thailand

Ban Phachi Junction ชุมทางบ้านภาชี
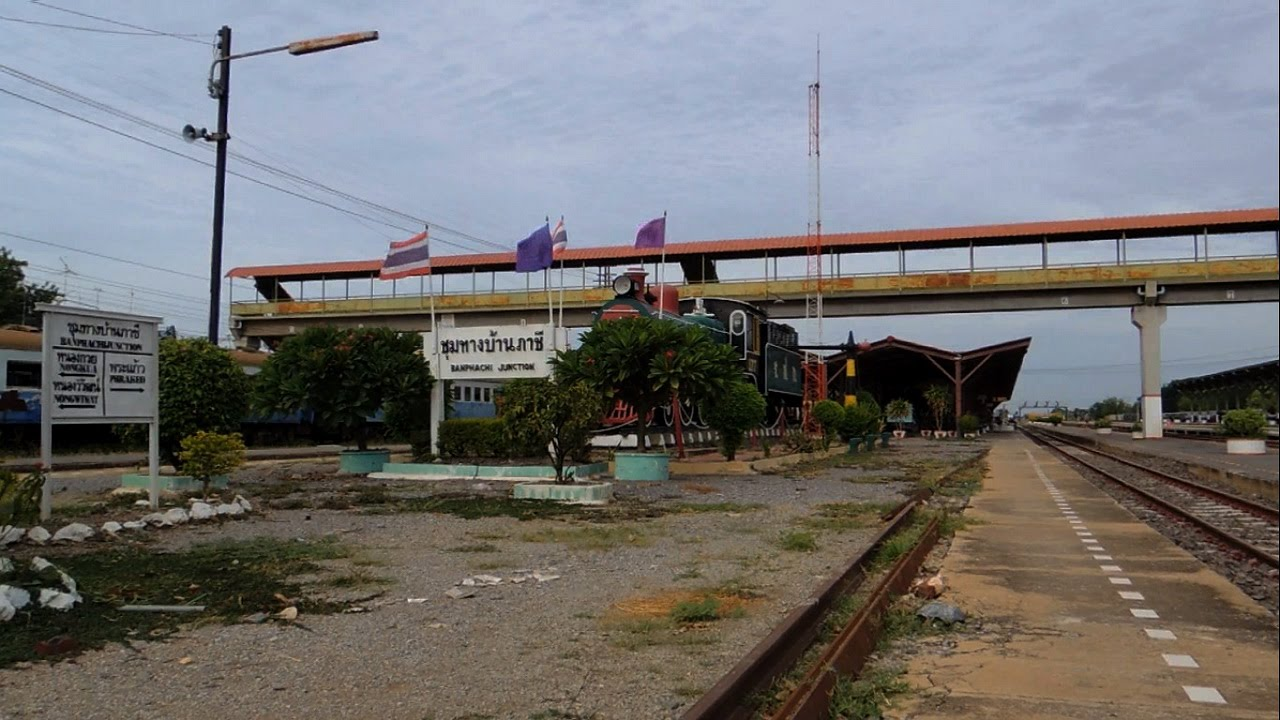
- Ban Phachi Junction in June 2018

General information
- Location: Phachi Subdistrict, Phachi Municipality, Phra Nakhon Si Ayutthaya Province; Central Thailand; Thailand
- Coordinates: 14.4508°N 100.7212°E
- Operator: State Railway of Thailand
- Manager: Ministry of Transport
- Lines: Chiang Mai Main Line; Ubon Ratchathani Main Line
- Platforms: 11
- Tracks: 15

Construction
- Parking: Yes
- Accessible: Yes

Other information
- Station code: ภช
- Classification: Class 1

History
- Opened: c.1900; 126 years ago (original); 1 October 1949; 76 years ago (after rebuilding from bombing)
- Rebuilt: 1947; 79 years ago

Passengers
- 1500+ per day

Services
Preceding station	State Railway of Thailand	Following station
Phra Kaeo towards Hua Lamphong or Krung Thep Aphiwat	Northern Line	Don Ya Nang Halt towards Chiang Mai
Phra Kaeo towards Hua Lamphong or Krung Thep Aphiwat	Northeastern Line	Nong Kuai towards Ubon Ratchathani or Khamsavath (Laos)
Location

Ban Phachi Junction (Thai: สถานีชุมทางบ้านภาชี, RTGS: Sathani Chumthang Ban Phachi) is a railway junction located in Phachi District, Ayutthaya Province, Thailand. It is a Class 1 Station and serves as a junction for the North and Northeastern Line of the State Railway of Thailand. Ban Phachi Junction had to be rebuilt after the Second World War after being hit by Allied Bombing. Some special express and express trains do not call at this station.Ban Phachi was also known for its "Phachi" Coconut Ice Cream sold by hawkers with trays walking along platforms and is normally eaten using a plastic straw. The dessert is quite famous and has been mentioned on some Thai television shows. But since the beginning of August 2018, sales ended permanently.
