= Lamphun railway station =

Railway station in Thailand

Coordinates: 18.5938°N 99.0210°E

Lamphun ลำพูน
- Station in 2026

General information
- Location: Nai Muang Subdistrict, Mueang Lamphun District, Lamphun Province
- Owner: State Railway of Thailand
- Line: Northern Line
- Platforms: 2
- Tracks: 4

Other information
- Station code: ลพ.

Services
Preceding station	State Railway of Thailand	Following station
Nong Lom towards Hua Lamphong or Krung Thep Aphiwat	Northern Line	Pa Sao towards Chiang Mai
Location

Lamphun railway station is a railway station in the Nai Mueang Subdistrict, Mueang Lamphun District, Lamphun Province, Thailand. It is the main railway station of the province and is owned by the State Railway of Thailand (SRT). Lamphun railway station is 729 m (0.5 mi) from Bangkok railway station. To the south of the railway station is a metal railway bridge crossing the River Kuang.
