= Rai Oi railway station =

Railway station in Thailand

Coordinates: 17.3464°N 100.0780°E

Rai Oi ไร่อ้อย

General information
- Location: Mu 5 (Ban Tha Din Daeng), Rai Oi Subdistrict, Phichai District, Uttaradit
- Owner: State Railway of Thailand
- Line: Northern Line
- Platforms: 1
- Tracks: 2

Other information
- Station code: รอ.

Services
Preceding station	State Railway of Thailand	Following station
Phichai towards Hua Lamphong or Krung Thep Aphiwat	Northern Line	Ban Dara Junction towards Chiang Mai
Location

Rai Oi railway station is a railway station located in Rai Oi Subdistrict, Phichai District, Uttaradit. It is located 453.986 km from Bangkok railway station and is a class 3 railway station. It is on the Northern Line of the State Railway of Thailand.
