= Poramin Bridge =

- Coordinates: 17°22′19″N 100°04′34″E
- Carries: 1 Railway track, Wooden pedestrian
- Crosses: Nan River
- Locale: Uttaradit, northern Thailand
- Official name: Poramin Bridge

Characteristics
- Design: Truss bridge
- Total length: 262.40 m.

History
- Opened: 1909

Poramin Bridge (Thai: สะพานปรมินทร์), also known as Ban Dara Bridge (สะพานบ้านดารา) is a railway bridge over the Nan River in Tambon Ban Dara, Amphoe Phichai, Uttaradit Province in northern Thailand. It is located south of Ban Dara Junction railway station and is between Rai Oi and Ban Dara railway stations.

The historic bridge's name translates to "The Great One Bridge". It was built in 1906, and King Chulalongkorn (Rama V) opened it ceremonially on December 7, 1909. The originally nameless area was named by King Chulalongkorn when he was waiting for his train to add firewood and water. He asked the train staff "Where is here?", to which he received the response "This place has no name yet". He therefore gave the name "Ban Dara" after Dara Rasmi, one of his princess consorts, who was a northern person.

Poramin Bridge was built by German engineer and considered the largest railway bridge in the northern region.

During 1942–48 when Thailand was fighting in World War II, the bridge damaged by bombing. After the war ended, restorations were completed in 1953.
