= Uttaradit railway station =

Railway station in Tha It, Thailand

Coordinates: 17°37′11″N 100°05′50″E

Uttaradit อุตรดิตถ์
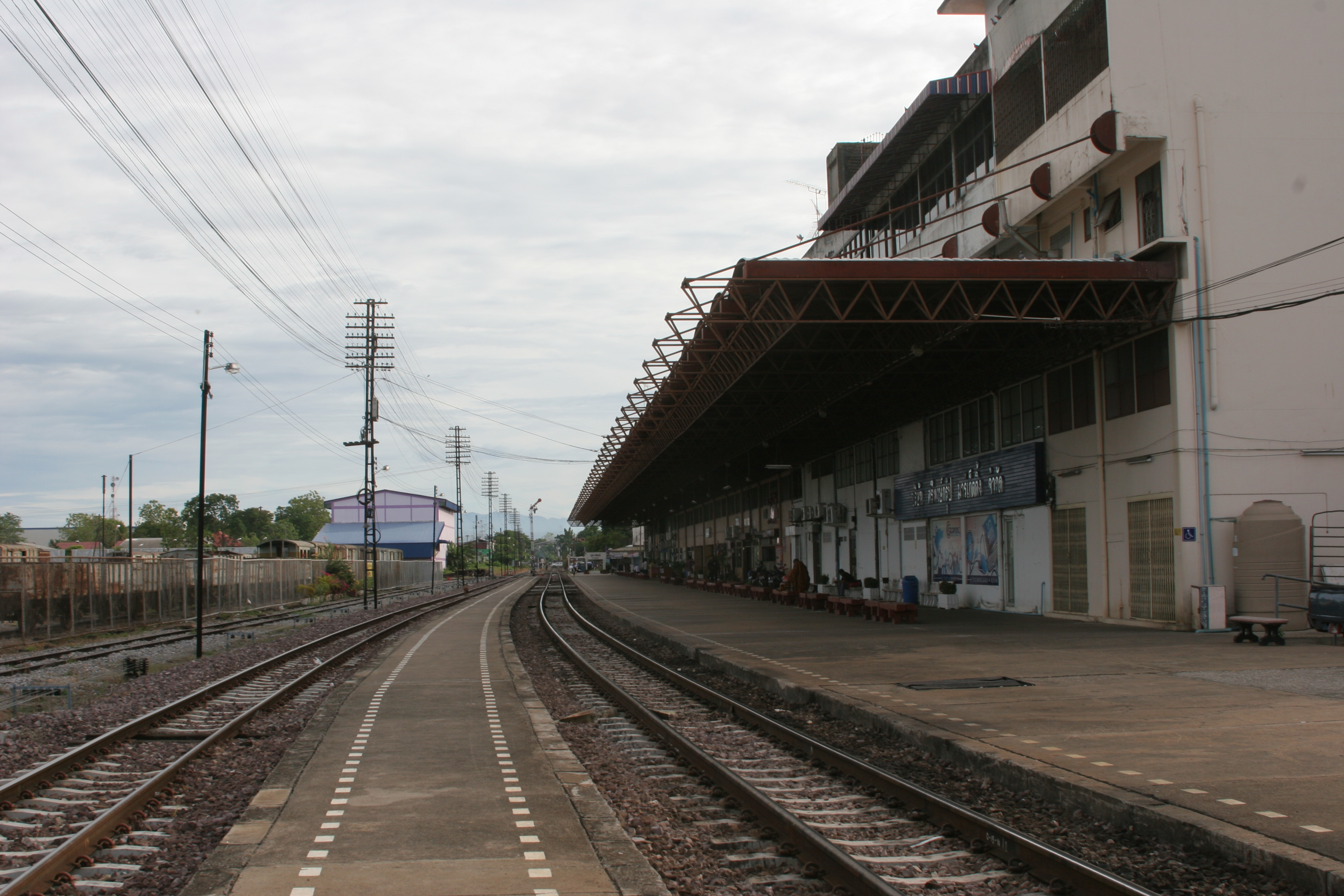

General information
- Location: Samranruen Road, Tha It Subdistrict, Uttaradit City
- Owner: State Railway of Thailand
- Line: Northern Line
- Platforms: 2
- Tracks: 9

Construction
- Parking: yes

Other information
- Station code: อด.

History
- Opened: 1910; 116 years ago
- Rebuilt: 1951; 75 years ago

Services
Preceding station	State Railway of Thailand	Following station
Wang Kaphi towards Hua Lamphong or Krung Thep Aphiwat	Northern Line	Sila At towards Chiang Mai
Location

Uttaradit railway station is the main railway station for Uttaradit province. It is owned by the State Railway of Thailand and serves the Northern Line. Uttaradit railway station is located 485.17 kilometres (301.5 mi) from Bangkok railway station. It is also a Class 1 Station and is also the base for many maintenance subdivisions for the Northern Line.

== History ==
During 1905-1906 King Chulalongkorn planned to build a railway line from Bangkok-Chiang Mai and another from Uttaradit to Ban Krai then across the Mekong River to Luang Prabang. Thus a railway station was built here, and trees were cleared and the land was leveled to await the track-laying process, which happened later in 1907. In 1907, trains hauled rock-filled wagons in which the people saw every day. A railway station was therefore built in the forest cemetery of Wat Tha Thanon (now known as Uttaradit Station) in 1909 and was finished in 1910. The first Uttaradit Station was built in the Modernist Style of Jugendstil with a tower in the middle, designed and built by German architect Karl Siegfried Döhring. However, the tower was destroyed during World War II. The station was rebuilt after the war and opened for service once again in 1953. Due to an increase of train traffic, a new station had to be built 2.35 kilometres north and was finished in 1958, it was called Sila At Station.

Today Uttaradit Station is kept as an OTOP centre and there have been plans of expanding the station building into a department store.

== Sub-divisions ==
These are the sub-divisions within the area of Uttaradit railway station:

1. Uttaradit Branch of Railcars Department
2. Uttaradit Branch Sector 3 of Mechanical Department
3. Uttaradit Branch of Locomotives Department
4. Uttaradit Locomotive Depot
5. Uttaradit Public Administration of the Ministry of Commerce
6. Uttaradit Branch of Railway Medical Unit
7. Uttaradit Branch Railway's Labour Union
8. Uttaradit Station Signal Control Box
9. Uttaradit Tourist Information Centre and Centre for OTOP Products

== Gallery ==
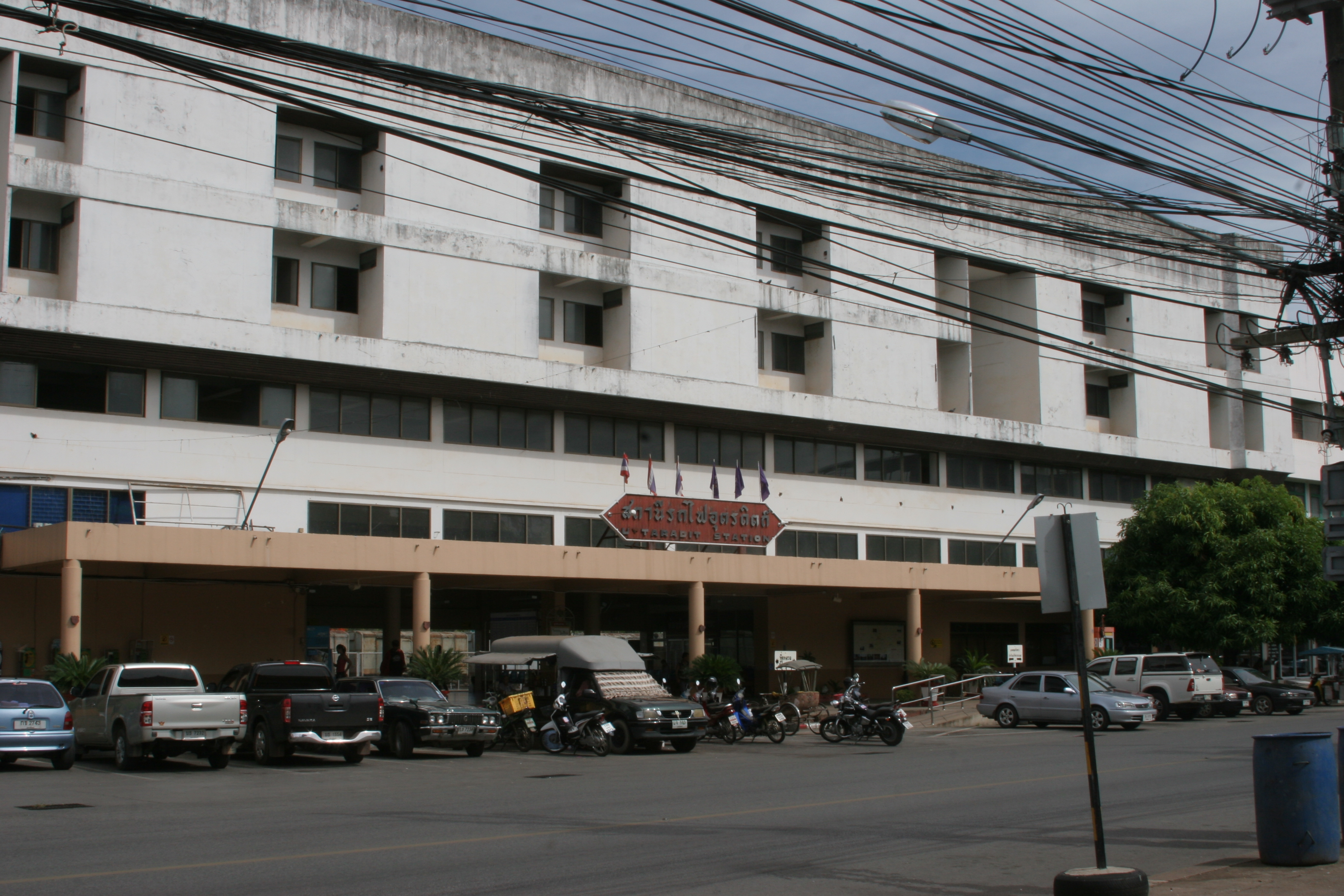
The facade of the current Uttaradit station.

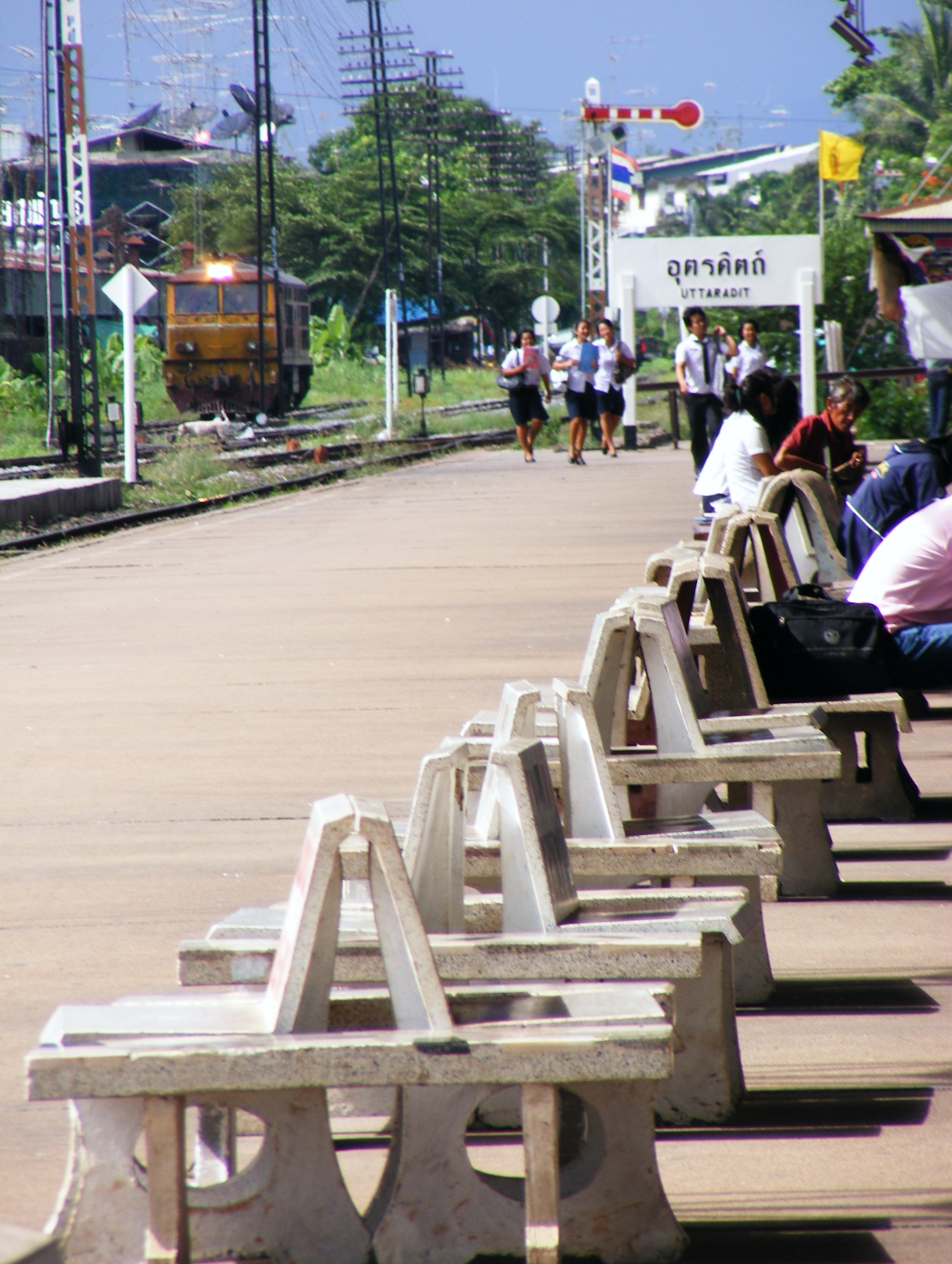
The platform and sign of Uttaradit station

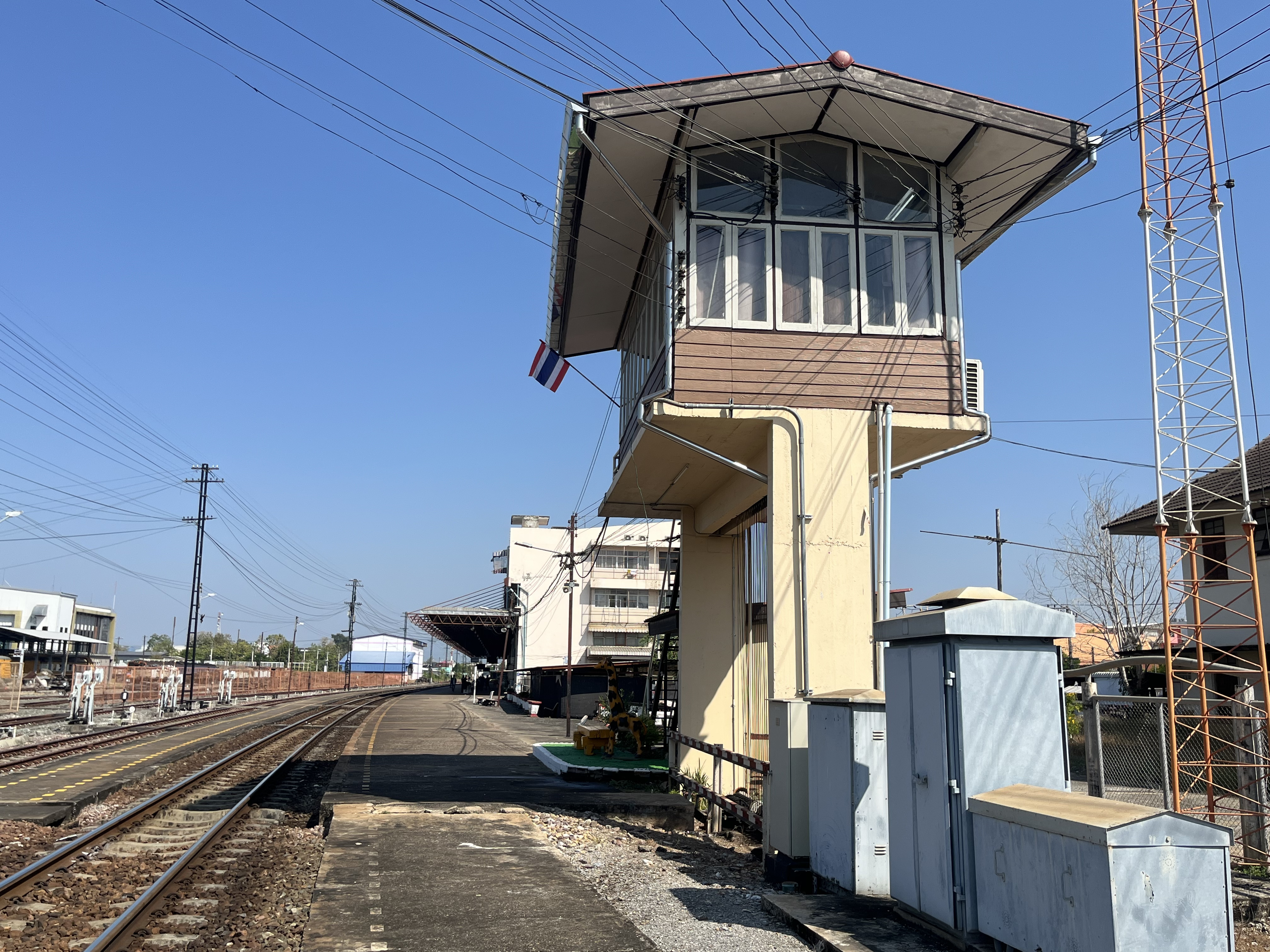
Uttaradit signalbox

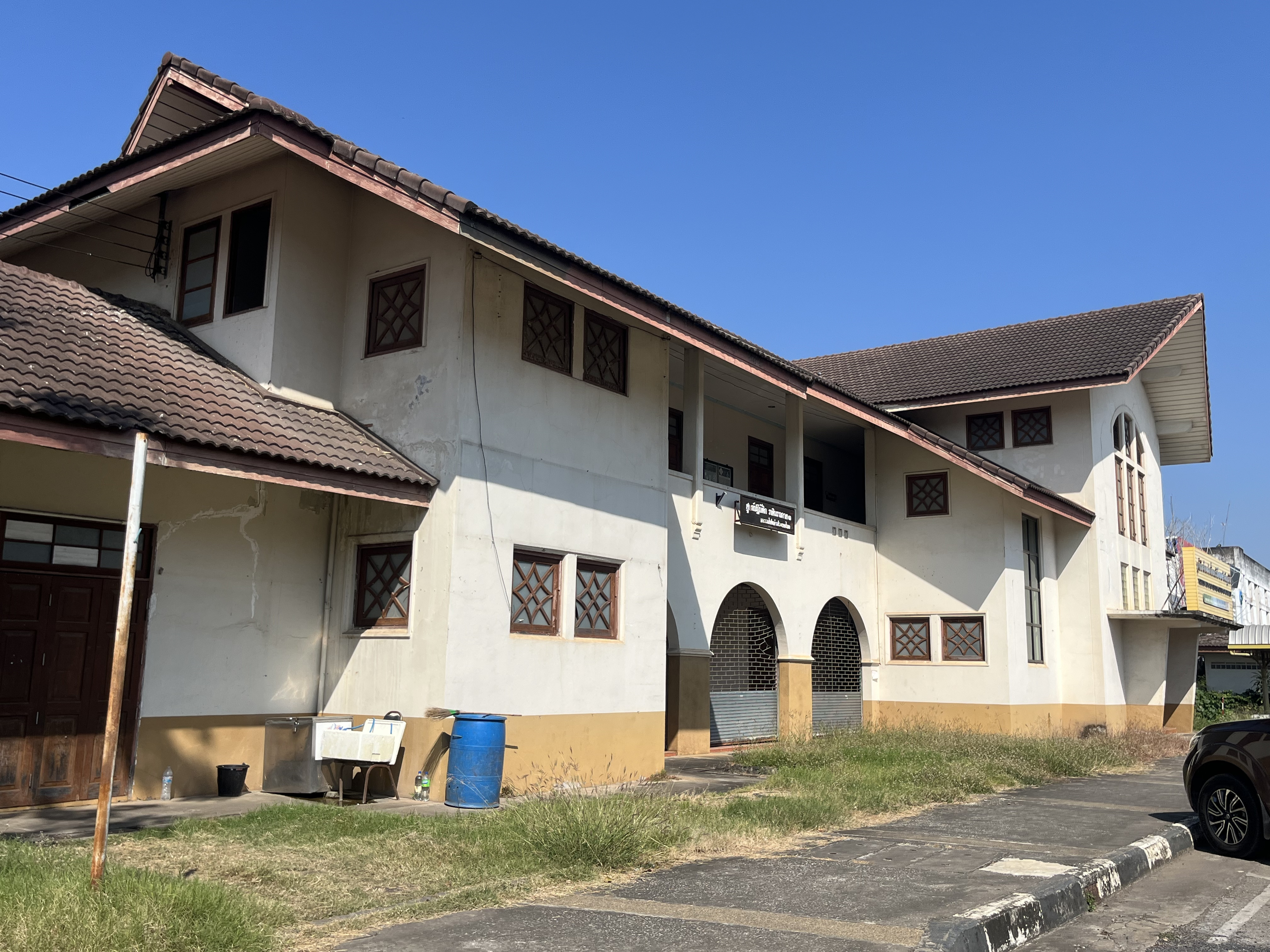
The second station building opened in 1953. It is now Uttaradit's tourism and OTOP service center, as the station office moved to a nearby building in 1987.
