= Ban Dara Junction railway station =

Railway station in Ban Dara, Thailand

Coordinates: 17°22′57″N 100°04′58″E

Ban Dara Junction ชุมทางบ้านดารา

General information
- Location: Ban Dara Subdistrict, Phichai District, Uttaradit; Uttaradit Province; Thailand
- Owner: State Railway of Thailand
- Operator: State Railway of Thailand
- Lines: Chiang Mai Main Line; Sawankhalok Line
- Platforms: 2
- Tracks: 3

Construction
- Parking: Yes

Other information
- Station code: ดร.
- Classification: Class 3

History
- Rebuilt: 1968; 58 years ago

Services
Preceding station	State Railway of Thailand	Following station
Rai Oi towards Hua Lamphong or Krung Thep Aphiwat	Northern Line	Tha Sak towards Chiang Mai
Terminus	Northern Line Sawankhalok Line	Khlong Maphlap towards Sawankhalok
Location

Ban Dara Junction (Thai: สถานีชุมทางบ้านดารา, RTGS: Sathani Chumthang Ban Dara) is a railway station located in Phichai District, Uttaradit. It is a Class 3 Station and serves as a junction for the Sawankhalok Branch. Ban Dara Junction is located 438.31 kilometres (272.35 mi) from Bangkok Railway Station. It is also the nearest station to Poramin Railway Bridge.

== History ==
Ban Dara Junction was the first railway junction on the Northern Line, with the branch to Sawankhalok railway station. The name comes together with the subdistrict itself. King Chulalongkorn used the railway to visit this junction and found out that this village had no name. Therefore, he decided to name this place Dara. So forth, the station's name is Ban Dara until this day.

Between 1 April 2020 and 15 July 2023, the special express service on the Sawankhalok branch line was suspended due to the outbreak of COVID-19 in Thailand. As a result, no train services operated on the entire branch line for over three years. On 15 July 2023, services resumed on the line with a single local train running between Sila At and Sawankhalok.
