= Sawankhalok railway station =

Railway station in Thailand

Coordinates: 17°18′53″N 99°49′56″E

Sawankhalok สวรรคโลก
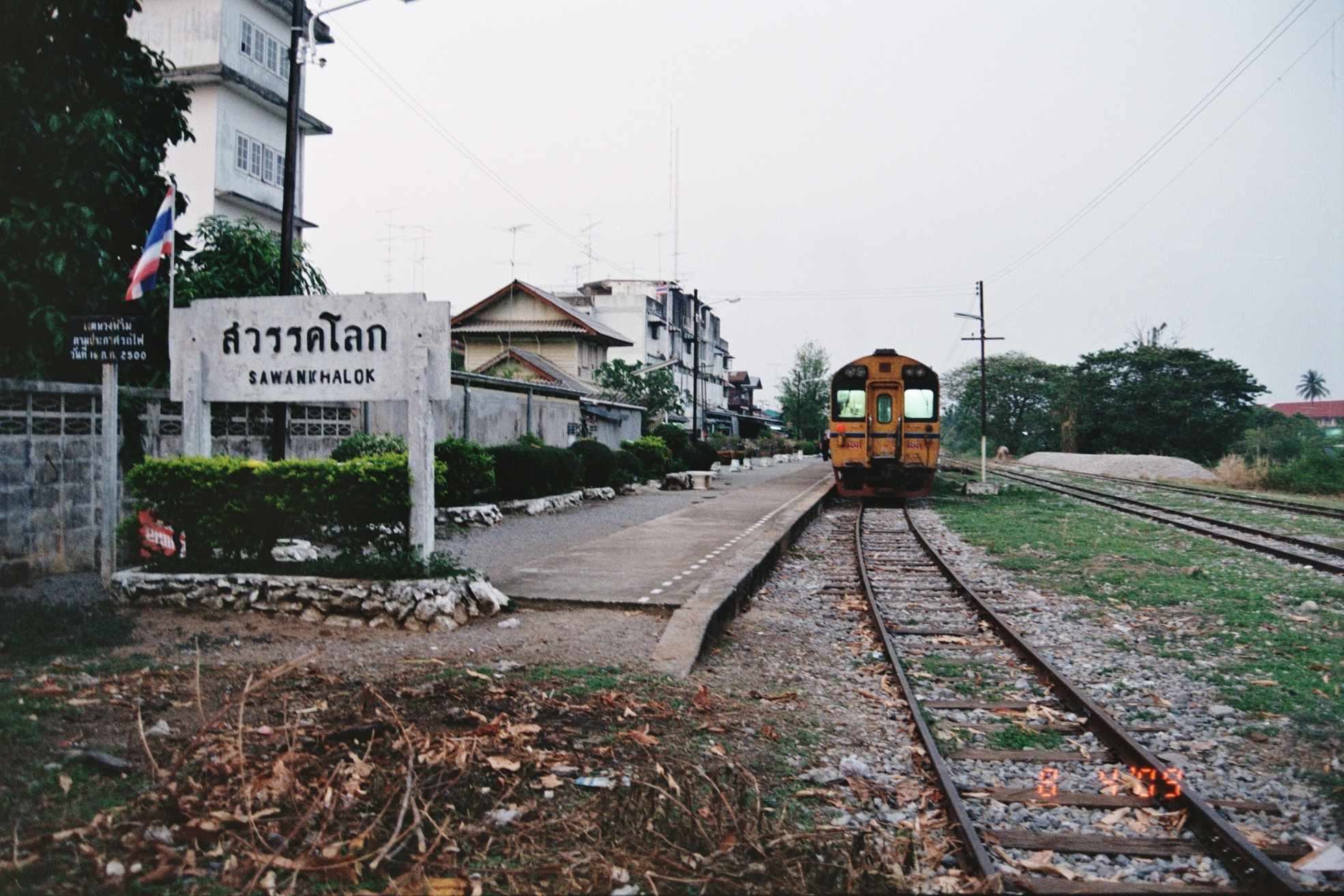

General information
- Location: Chrotwithithong Road, Muang Sawankhalok Subdistrict, Sawankhalok District; Sukhothai Province; Thailand
- Operator: State Railway of Thailand
- Manager: Ministry of Transport
- Line: Sawankhalok Line
- Distance: 487.14 kilometres (302.7 mi) from Bangkok
- Platforms: 1
- Tracks: 2

Construction
- Structure type: At-grade
- Parking: Yes

Other information
- Station code: สว.
- Classification: Class 3

History
- Opened: 15 August 1910; 116 years ago

Services
Preceding station	State Railway of Thailand	Following station
Khlong Maphlap towards Ban Dara Junction	Northern Line Sawankhalok Line	Terminus
Location

Sawankhalok Station is a railway station located in Sawankhalok District, Sukhothai. It is a Class 3 Station and is located 487.14 kilometres (302.7 mi) from Bangkok railway station. This station uses signs as signals instead of lighted poles or semaphores and is operated manually. This is one of the two stations on the Northern Line that uses this signalling system, the other being Khlong Maphlap railway station, the preceding station. This station is the terminus of the Sawankhalok Branch from Ban Dara Junction. Prior to 2020, a single special express train ran from Bangkok to Sila At with a stopover at Sawankhalok.

Between 1 April 2020 and 15 July 2023, the special express service was suspended due to the outbreak of COVID-19 in Thailand. As a result, no train services operated on the entire branch line for over three years. On 15 July 2023, services resumed on the line with a single local train running between Sila At and Sawankhalok.
