= Nakhon Phing Express =

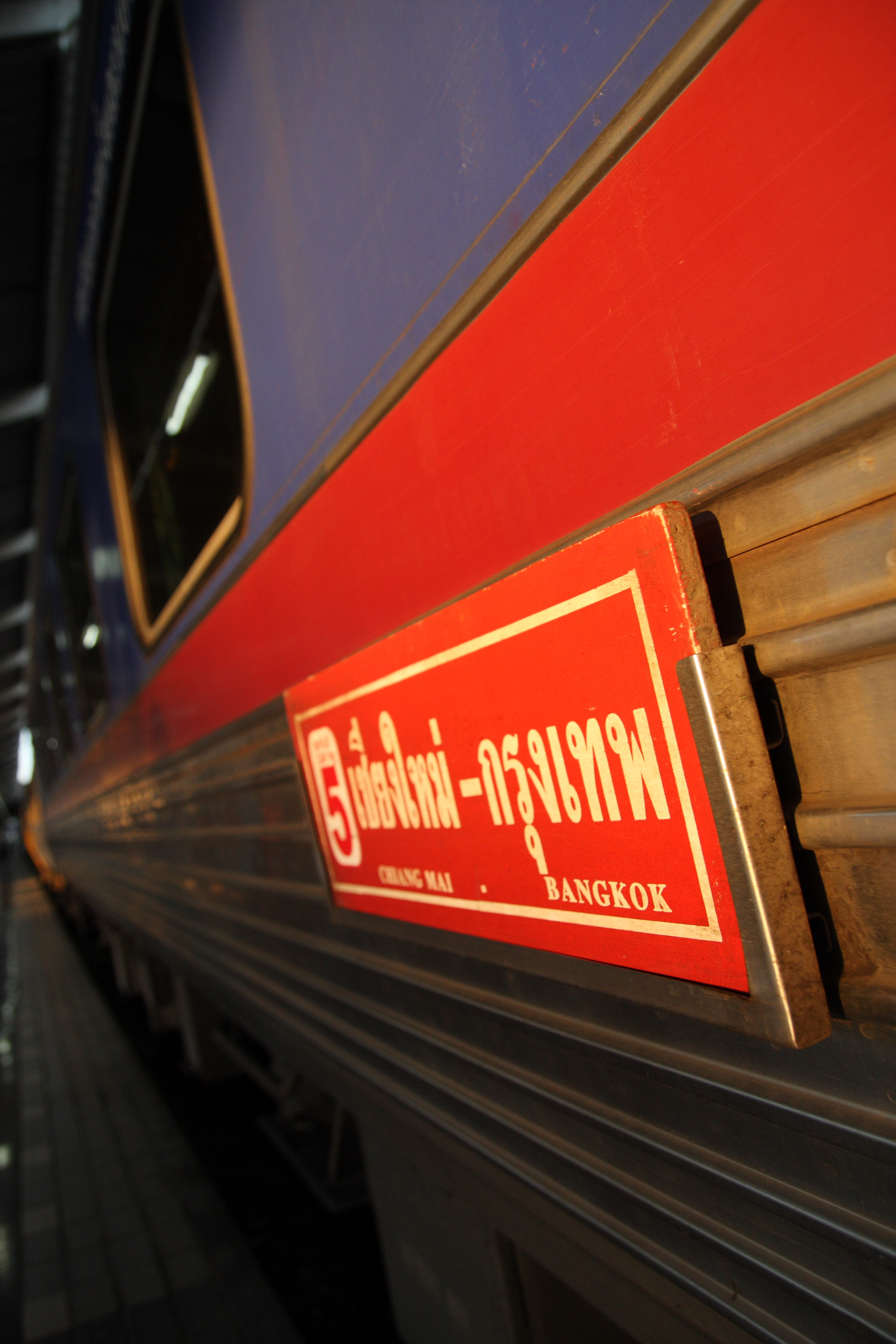
- Nakhon Phing Express passenger carriages at Chiang Mai Railway Station

Overview
- Service type: Inter-city
- Status: Replaced
- Locale: Northern Thailand and Central Thailand
- First service: 13 April 1987
- Last service: 12 November 2016
- Former operator(s): State Railway of Thailand

Route
- Termini: Bangkok; Chiang Mai
- Stops: 17
- Distance travelled: 751 km (467 mi)
- Average journey time: 13 hours
- Service frequency: once a day
- Train number(s): 1-2

On-board services
- Class(es): First and second class
- Disabled access: Fully accessible
- Catering facilities: At-seat meals in food class
- Baggage facilities: Yes

Technical
- Track gauge: 1,000 mm (3 ft 3 3/8 in) metre gauge
- Operating speed: max. 90 km/h

Express Nakhon Phing (Thai: รถด่วนพิเศษนครพิงค์) was a special express train operated by the State Railway of Thailand. The trains designated as Express Nakhon Phing were Train No. 1 for Bangkok – Chiang Mai and Train No. 2 for Chiang Mai – Bangkok. These trains offer 1st and 2nd class sleeping cars, and a restaurant car, but no seating accommodation or 3rd class cars. The Express Nakhon Phing was then regarded to be the best train offered by the SRT.

The service has now been replaced by the Uttarawithi Express No.9 and 10 are replaced with new train sets from Changchun Railway Vehicles Co., Ltd.

== Brief history ==
The Nakhon Phing Special Express was introduced on 13 April 1987, as the part of "Visit Thailand Year 1987" and supplanted the Northern Express with the schedule of the old Northern Express (now Special Express 13/14, introduced on 1 November 1922).

The Nakhon Phing Special Express became a model for Thai Railway services since 2002 along with the International Express 35/36, Thaksin Special Express 37/38, and DMU Special Express 21/22.

The last service of the Nakhon Express arrived at Bangkok on the morning of 12 November 2016, ending its service of 29 years, 10 months and 30 days.

== See also ==
- Chiang Mai Station
- Hua Lamphong
- Bang Sue Junction
- Ayutthaya Station
- State Railway of Thailand
