= Nakhon Sawan railway station =

Railway station in Thailand

Coordinates: 15°39′45″N 100°09′30″E

Nakhon Sawan นครสวรรค์
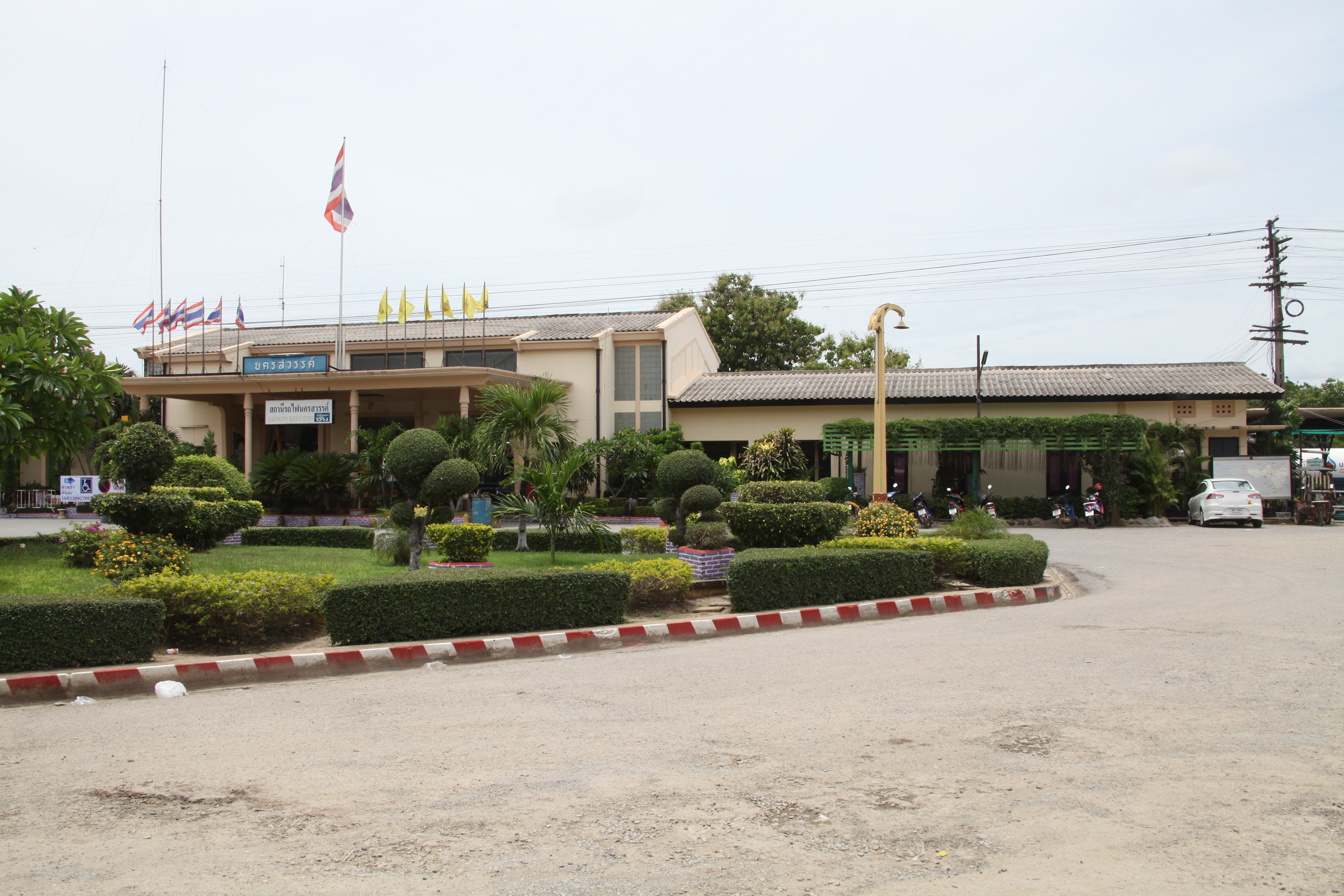

General information
- Location: National Road No. 3001, Nong Pling Sub-district, Nakhon Sawan City, Nakhon Sawan
- Owner: State Railway of Thailand
- Line: Northern Line
- Platforms: 2
- Tracks: 7

Construction
- Accessible: yes

Other information
- Station code: นว.

History
- Former names: Nong Pling

Services
Preceding station	State Railway of Thailand	Following station
Khao Thong towards Hua Lamphong or Krung Thep Aphiwat	Northern Line	Pak Nam Pho towards Chiang Mai
Location

Nakhon Sawan railway station is a railway station in Nong Pling Sub-district, Nakhon Sawan City, Nakhon Sawan Province. It is a Class 1 station and the main station in Nakhon Sawan Province. It is about 245 kilometres from Bangkok railway station. The railyard serves as a PTT Petroleum tanker car yard with a spur line to a gas refinery.

Originally, the station was called Nong Pling railway station, named after the sub-district where it was located. It was merely a secondary station compared to Pak Nam Pho railway station, which functioned as the de facto provincial station, due to its location being farther from the city center, also colloquially known as Pak Nam Pho. Passengers arriving here had to continue their journey by road, though only very few did so, even in modern times. The station has since been renamed Nakhon Sawan railway station and has become the main provincial station, while Pak Nam Pho railway station has seen a significant reduction in its importance.
