= Tron railway station =

Railway station in Tron, Thailand

Coordinates: 17.4832°N 100.1095°E

Tron ตรอน

General information
- Location: Mu 4 (Ban Wang Hin), Wang Daeng Subdistrict, Tron District, Uttaradit
- Owner: State Railway of Thailand
- Line: Northern Line
- Platforms: 1
- Tracks: 2

Other information
- Station code: ตอ.

Services
Preceding station	State Railway of Thailand	Following station
Tha Sak towards Hua Lamphong or Krung Thep Aphiwat	Northern Line	Wang Kaphi towards Chiang Mai
Location

Tron railway station is a railway station located in Wang Daeng Subdistrict, Tron District, Uttaradit. It is located 469.863 km from Bangkok railway station and is a class 2 railway station. It is on the Northern Line of the State Railway of Thailand.
