= Sawankhalok Line =

Railway line in Thailand

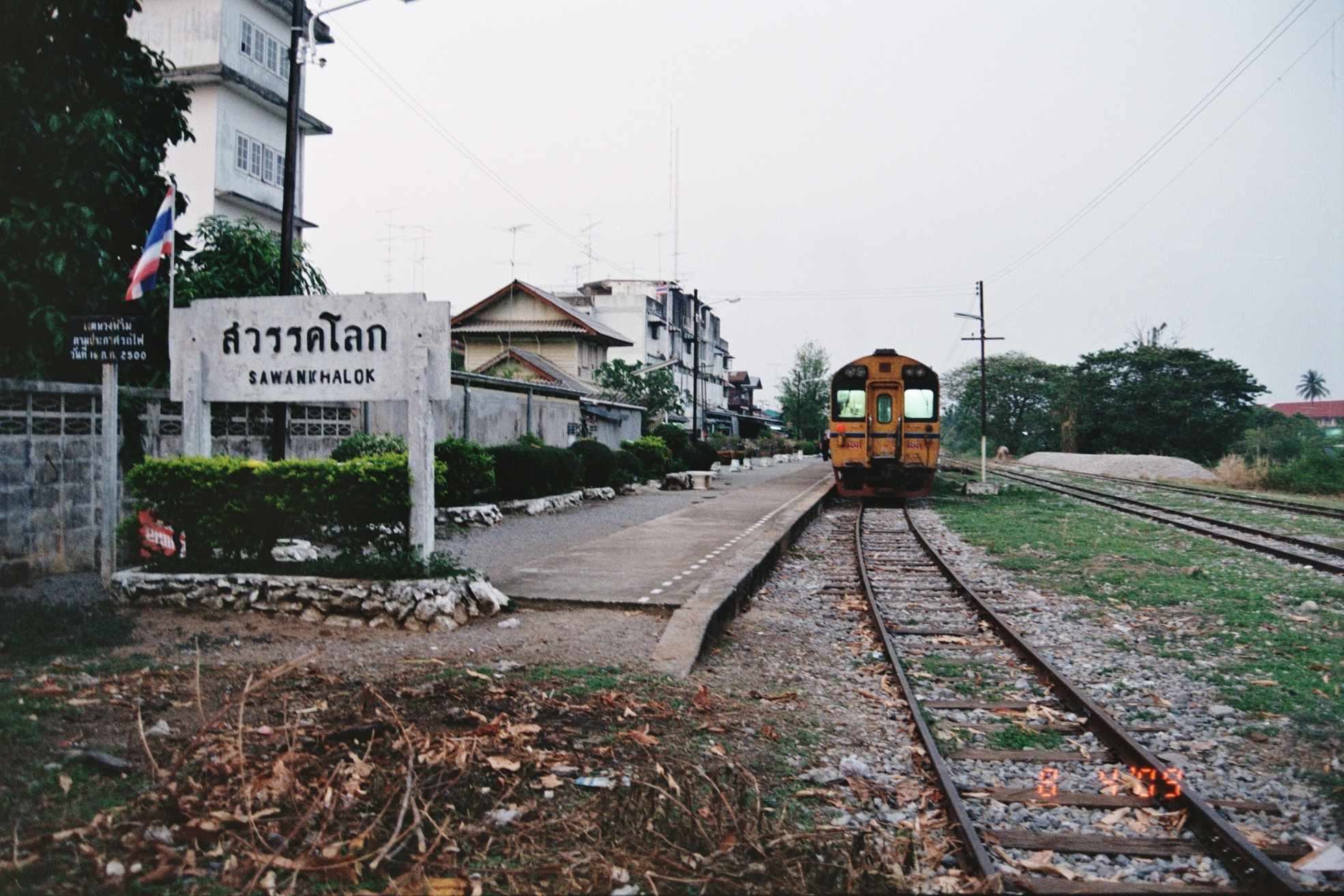
- Sawankhalok Railway Station

Overview
- Status: Operational
- Owner: State Railway of Thailand
- Locale: Uttaradit Province, and Sukhothai Province
- Termini: Ban Dara Junction; Sawankhalok
- Stations: 3

Service
- Type: Inter-city rail
- System: State Railway of Thailand
- Operator(s): SRT
- Depot(s): Uttaradit Depot
- Rolling stock: British Rail Class 158 3 cars per train

History
- Opened: 15 August 1910

Technical
- Line length: 28.8 km (17.9 mi)
- Track gauge: 1,000 mm (3 ft 3 3/8 in) metre gauge

The Sawankhalok Line is a branch railway line which splits from Chiang Mai Main Line at Ban Dara Junction, and ends at Sawankhalok. There are three stations on the line: Ban Dara Junction, Khlong Maphlap, Sawankhalok.

== History ==
=== Timeline ===
No.	Segment	Year opened
1	Ban Dara Junction–Sawankhalok	1910

== Services ==
Train no.	Type	Termini	
3	Limited Express	Hua Lamphong	Sawankhalok

== Stations ==
English name	Thai Name	Code	Distance in km	Class	Thai abbr.	Note	Location
Ban Dara	บ้านดารา	1137	458.31	3	ดร.		Uttaradit
Khlong Lamung	คลองละมุง	1138	466.32	Halt		Closed	Uttaradit
Khlong Maphlap	คลองมะพลับ	1139	470.27	3	มป.		Sukhothai
Wat Khlong Pu	วัดคลองปู	1140	474.96	Halt		Closed	Sukhothai
Khlong Yang	คลองยาง	1141	479.03	Halt		Closed	Sukhothai
Nong Riang (Nong Wiang)	หนองเรียง	1142	483.08	Halt		Closed	Sukhothai
Sawankhalok	สวรรคโลก	1143	487.14	3	สว.		Sukhothai

== See also ==
- Chiang Mai Main Line
