= Saraphi railway station =

Railway station in Yang Noeng, Thailand

Coordinates: 18.7101°N 99.0417°E

Saraphi สารภี
- Station in 2026

General information
- Location: Yang Noeng Subdistrict, Saraphi District, Chiang Mai
- Owner: State Railway of Thailand
- Line: Northern Line
- Platforms: 1
- Tracks: 3

Other information
- Station code: ภี.

History
- Former names: Pa Yang Loeng

Services
Preceding station	State Railway of Thailand	Following station
Pa Sao towards Hua Lamphong or Krung Thep Aphiwat	Northern Line	Chiang Mai Terminus
Location

Saraphi railway station is a railway station located in Yang Noeng Subdistrict, Saraphi District, Chiang Mai. It is a class 3 railway station located 742.788 km (461.5 mi) from Bangkok railway station.
