= Sila At railway station =

Railway station in Thailand

Coordinates: 17°38′23″N 100°06′03″E

Sila At ศิลาอาสน์
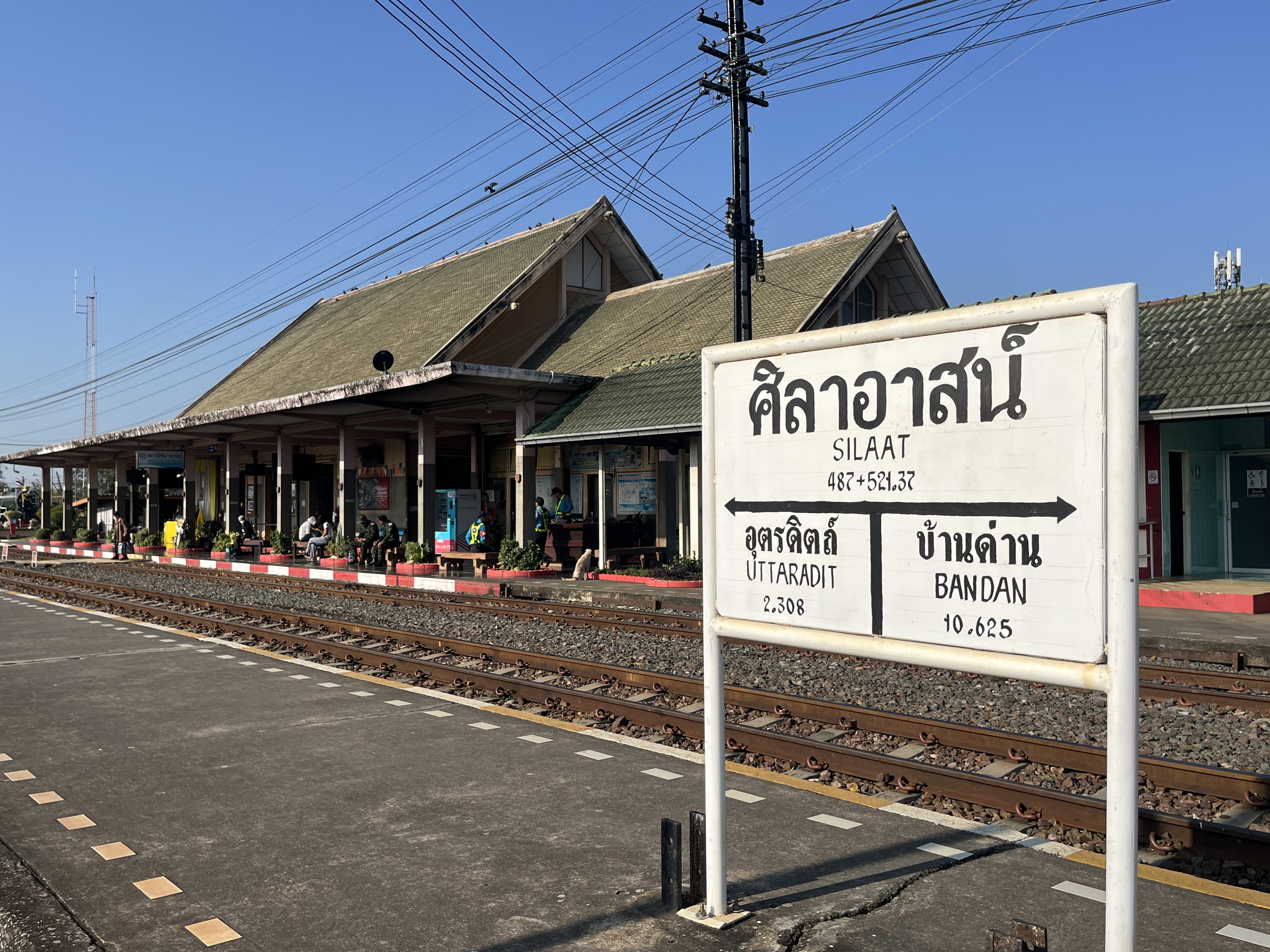
- Station in 2026

General information
- Location: National Highway No. 1045, Tha Pla Subdistrict, Uttaradit City
- Owner: State Railway of Thailand
- Line: Northern Line
- Platforms: 2
- Tracks: 8

Construction
- Parking: yes

Other information
- Station code: ศล.

History
- Opened: 1958; 68 years ago
- Former names: New Uttaradit

Services
Preceding station	State Railway of Thailand	Following station
Uttaradit towards Hua Lamphong or Krung Thep Aphiwat	Northern Line	Tha Sao Halt towards Chiang Mai
Location

Sila At railway station is a railway station in Uttaradit. It is a Class 1 station. It is 487.52 kilometres (302.9 mi) from Bangkok railway station.

== History ==
Due to Uttaradit Station being overcrowded, a new station had to be built. Therefore, in 1958, Sila At Station was built about two kilometres north of the original station, in the applied Thai architecture style. Originally, the station's name was "New Uttaradit", but was later changed and became the Northern Line's major railway container yard.

A Hanomag Steam Locomotive, No. 274, is on display on station premises.

== Sub-divisions ==
1. Sector 3 Train Traffic Department
2. State Railway of Thailand Northern Line Maintenance Department
3. Sila At Railway Police Station
4. Sila At Branch of State Railway of Thailand Medical Department
5. Sector 3 Mechanical and Engineering Department

== Gallery ==
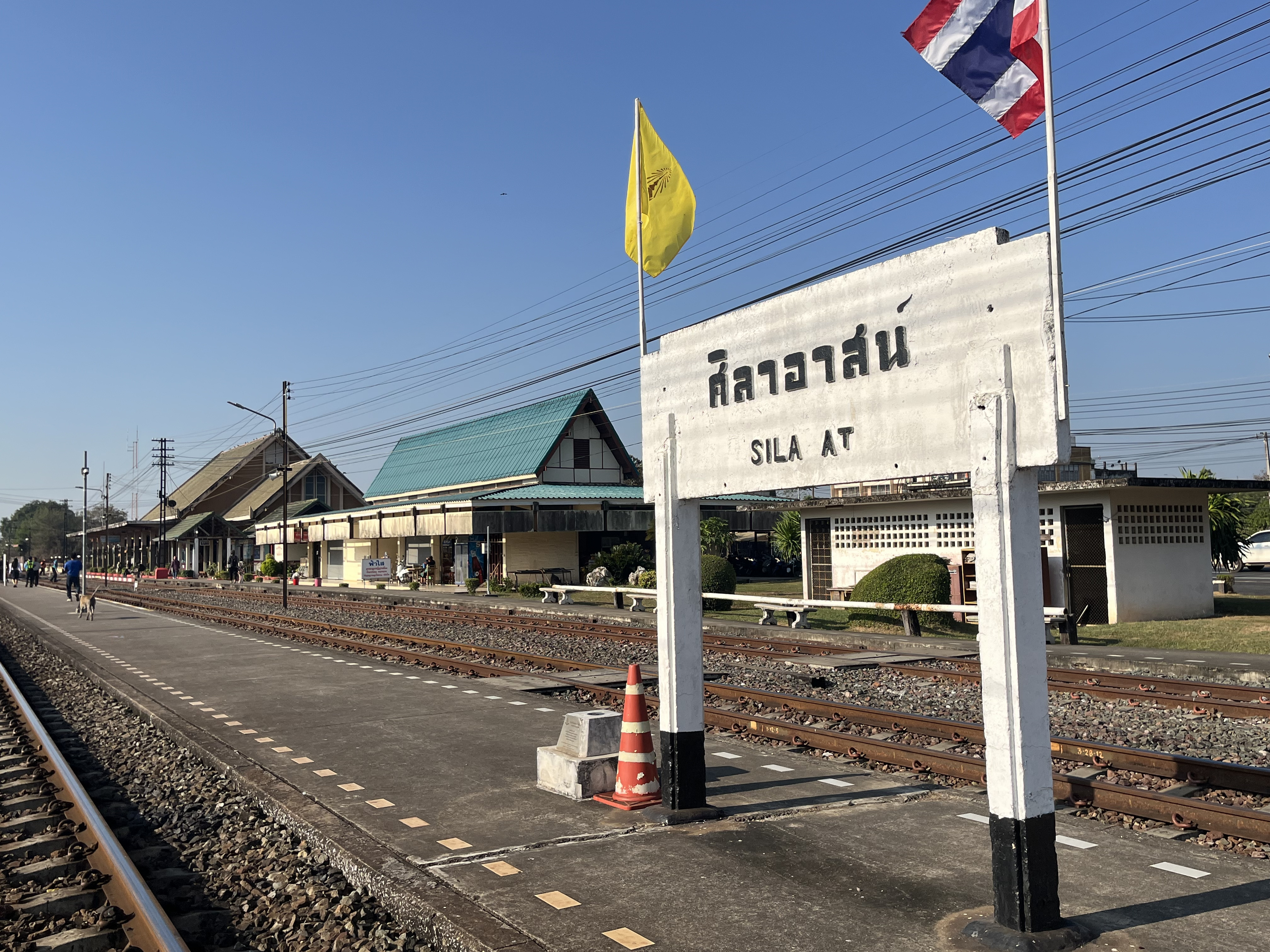
Station sign

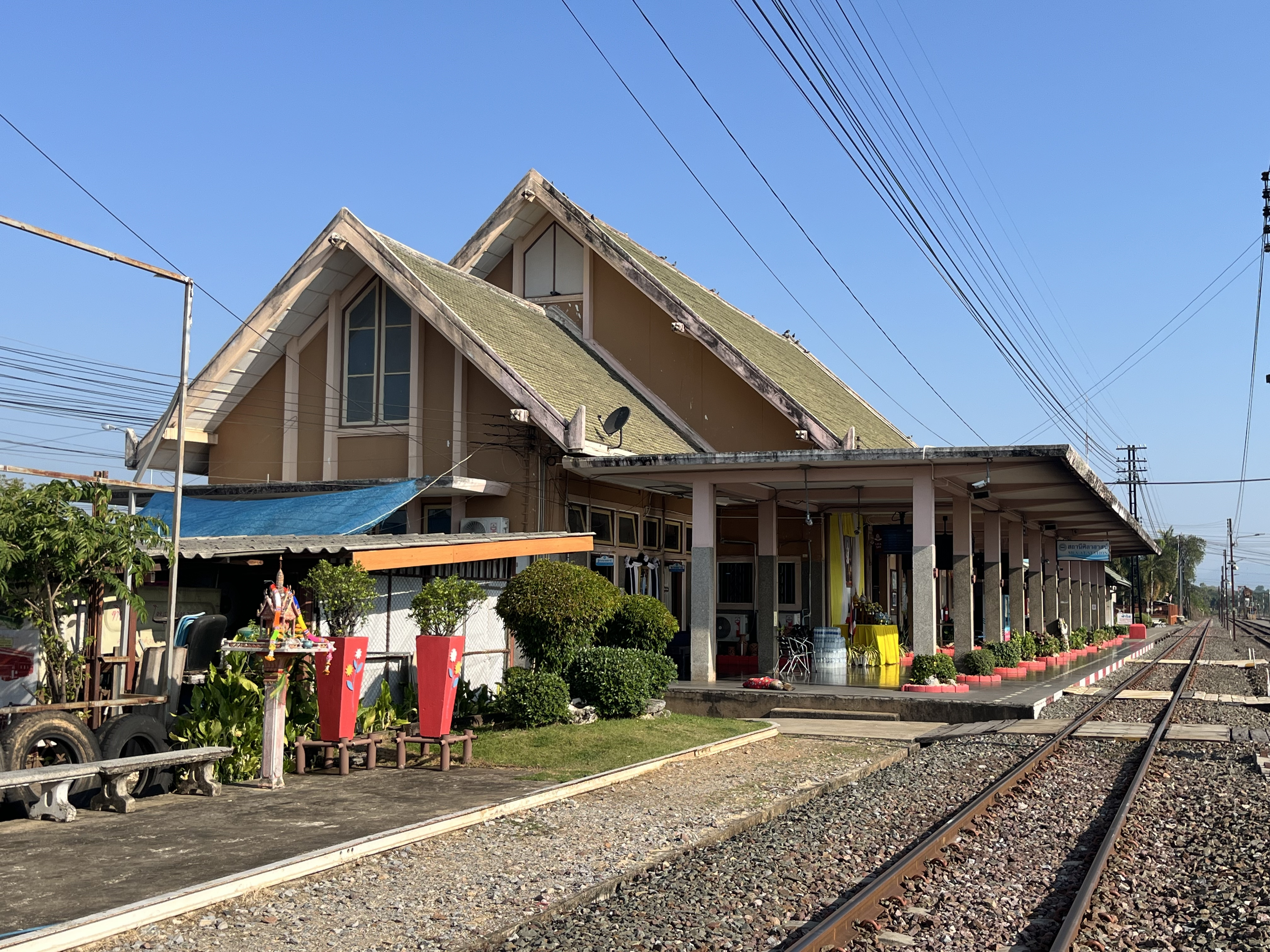
Station building

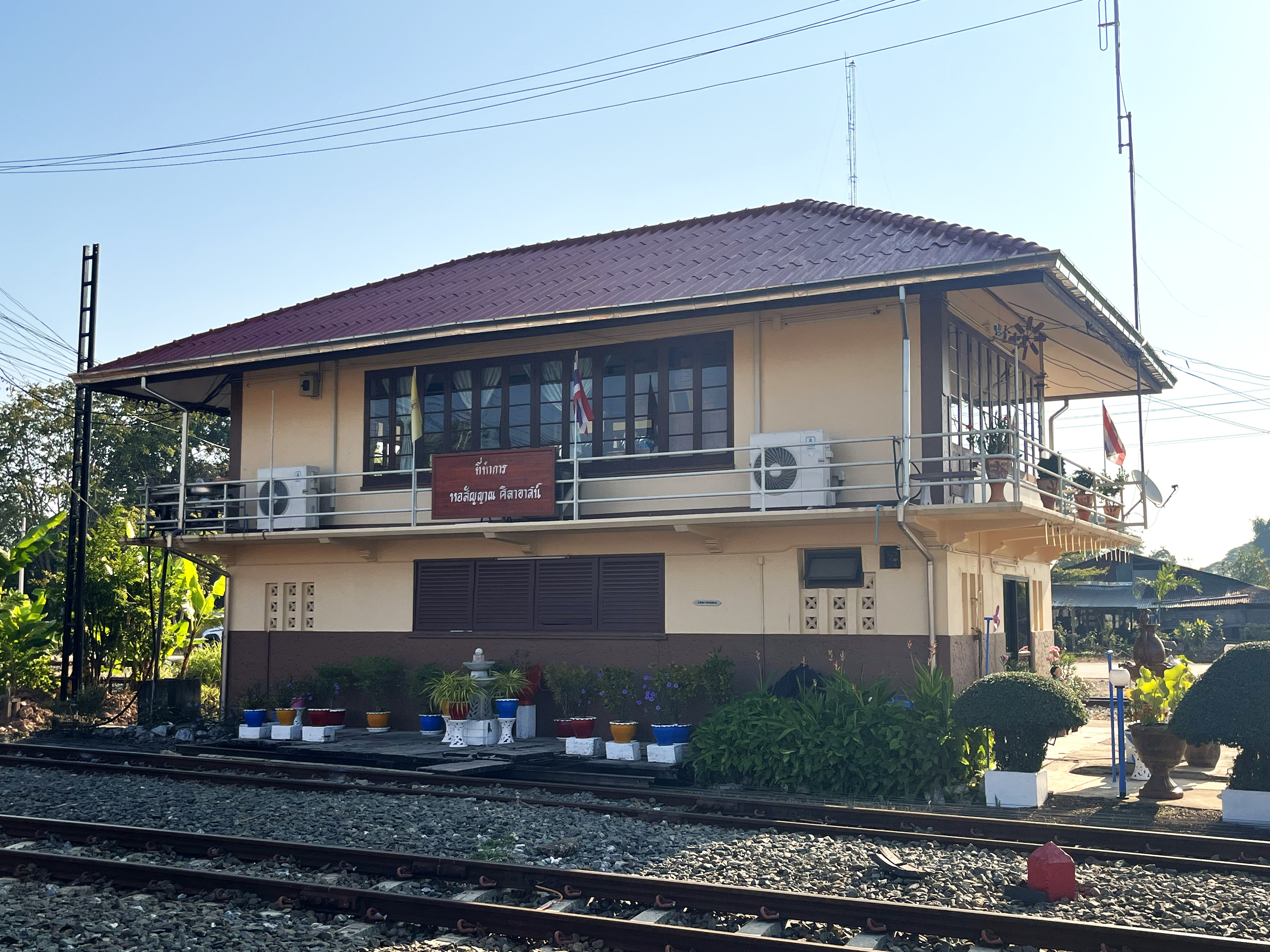
Sila At Signalbox

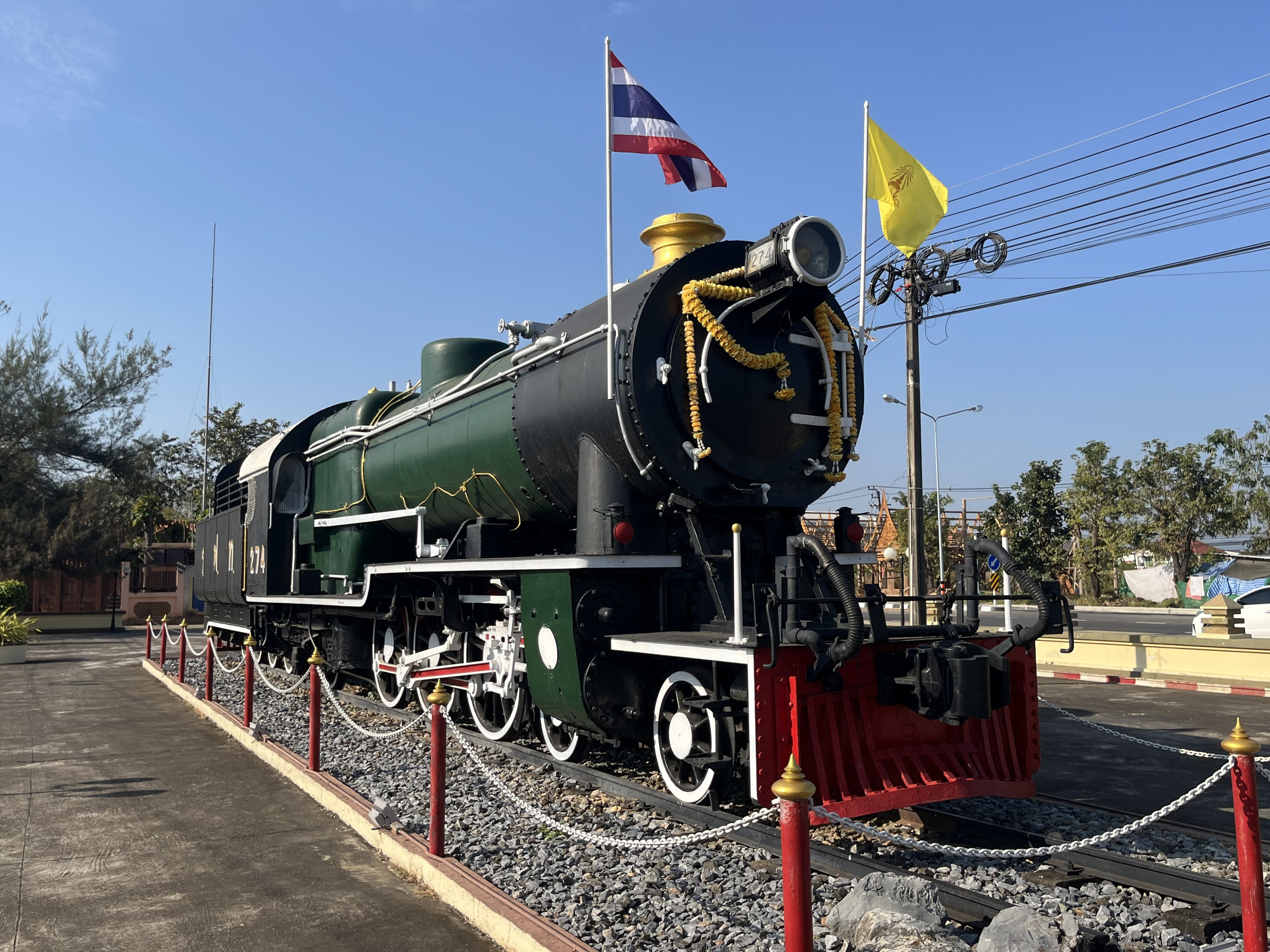
Hanomag Pacific steam locomotive No.274, stationed at Sila At.
