= Northern Line (Thailand) =

Railway line in Thailand

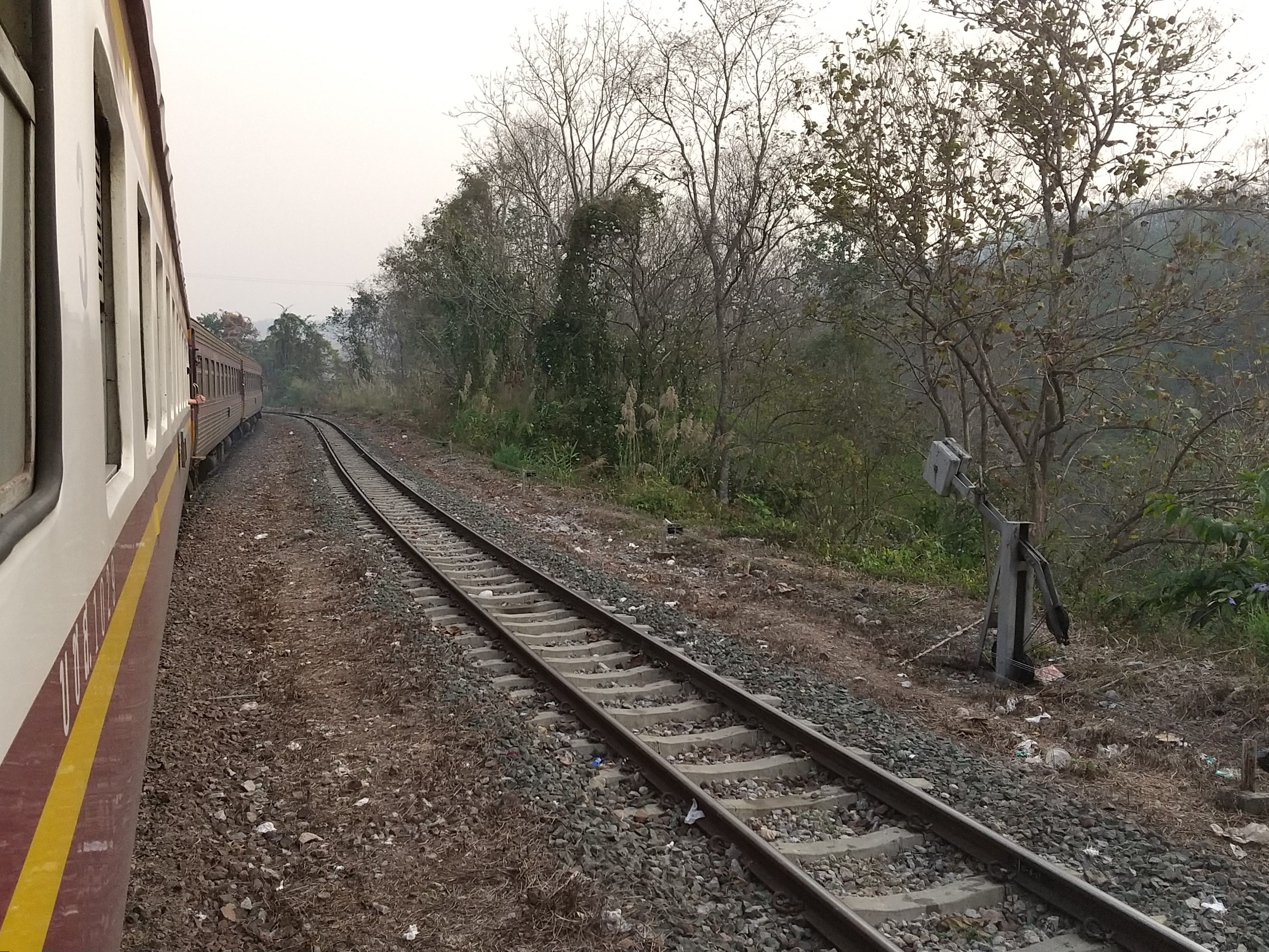
- Chiang Mai Main Line at Khun Tan station, Mae Tha District, Lamphun Province

Overview
- Status: Operational
- Owner: Government of Thailand
- Locale: Northern and Central Thailand
- Termini: Bangkok (Hua Lamphong) (ordinary and commuter services) Bangkok (Krung Thep Aphiwat) (long distance services); Chiang Mai Sawankhalok
- Connecting lines: Chiang Mai Main Line; Sawankhalok Line; Chiang Khong Line

Service
- Type: Inter-city rail; Regional rail; Commuter rail; Freight rail
- Operator: State Railway of Thailand
- Depots: Bang Sue; Pak Nam Pho; Uttaradit; Lampang

History
- Opened: 26 March 1896; 130 years ago
- Completed: 1 January 1922; 104 years ago

Technical
- Line length: 1,238.56 km (769.61 mi)
- Number of tracks: 2–1
- Track gauge: 1,000 mm (3 ft 3 3/8 in)

The Northern Line (Thai: ทางรถไฟสายเหนือ) is a railway line in Thailand, running between the capital Bangkok (at Krung Thep Aphiwat Central Terminal) and the northern city of Chiang Mai (Chiang Mai railway station). It is the second longest railway line in Thailand at 751 kilometres (467 mi) long, has 130 operational stations and halts, and is operated by the State Railway of Thailand. The line first opened in 1896. Major cities served by the line include Bangkok, Ayutthaya, Nakhon Sawan, Phitsanulok, Lampang, and Chiang Mai.

== History ==
=== Timeline ===
No.	Segment	Year opened
1	Bangkok–Ayutthaya	26 March 1896
2	Ayutthaya–Ban Phachi	1 November 1897
3	Ban Phachi–Lopburi	1 April 1901
4	Lopburi–Pak Nam Pho	1 November 1905
5	Pak Nam Pho–Phitsanulok	24 January 1908
6	Phitsanulok–Ban Dara Junction	11 November 1908
7	Ban Dara Junction–Pang Ton Phueng	15 August 1909
8	Pang Ton Phueng–Mae Phuak	1 June 1911
9	Mae Phuak–Pak Pan	15 November 1911
10	Pak Pan–Huai Mae Ta	1 May 1912
11	Huai Mae Ta–Ban Pin	15 June 1913
12	Ban Pin–Pha Kho	1 May 1914
13	Pha Kho–Mae Chang	15 December 1915
14	Mae Chang–Nakhon Lampang	1 April 1916
15	Nakhon Lampang–Pang Hua Phong	20 December 1916
16	Pang Hua Phong–Pang Yang	1 July 1918
17	Pang Yang–Chiang Mai	1 January 1922
18	Ban Klap - Khok Kathiam (Lopburi Bypass Line)	5 December 2025

The line's operations were severely affected during World War II.

Since January 2023, long-distance (Special Express, Express and Rapid) trains terminated at Krung Thep Aphiwat Central Terminal in Bangkok replacing Hua Lamphong station.

As part of the double- tracking project between Lopburi and Pak Nam Pho, the Lopburi Bypass line between Ban Klap and Khok Kathiam was opened on 5 December 2025, with one intermediate station: Lopburi 2 (Tha Wung)

A new 323 kilometer-long branch line, from Den Chai to the Lao border at Chiang Khong, is under construction and is expected to open in 2028.

=== Name changes ===
Name	Old name	Year changed
Ayutthaya	Krung Kao	1917
Nakhon Sawan	Nong Pling	1956
Phrom Phiram	Ban Krab Phuang	—N/a
Tron	Wang Hin	—N/a
Saraphi	Pa Yang Loeng	1961

== Infrastructure ==
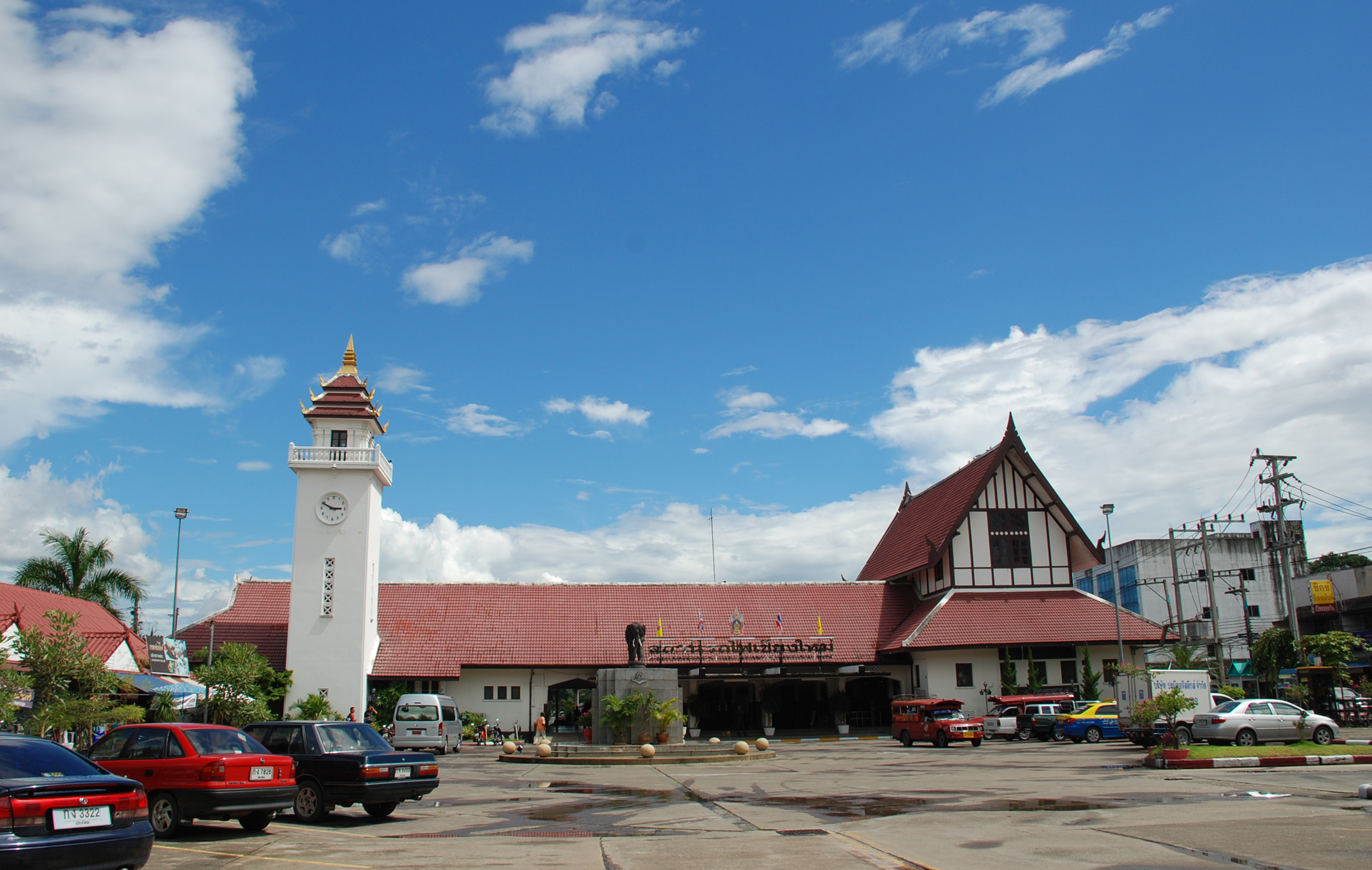
Chiang Mai railway station is the northern terminus of the line

The Northern Line is entirely single track, except at stations. Track gauge is 1,000 mm (3 ft 3 3/8 in) meter gauge. As the train frequency increases, it is becoming increasingly challenging to operate trains running both direction on the single-line track. Double-tracking has commenced between Lop Buri and Pak Nam Pho, and is planned for the rest of the line.

The Northern Line is not electrified. Regular services run on diesel power. The current maximum operating speed on the line is 100 km/h (62 mph).

=== Tunnels ===
Tunnel	Image	Length	Location	Note
Khun Tan Tunnel		1,352.15 m (4,436.2 ft)	Lampang and Lamphun Province	The longest tunnel in Thailand.
Khao Phlueng Tunnel		362.44 m (1,189.1 ft)	Uttaradit and Phrae Province	
Huai Mae Lan Tunnel		130.20 m (427.2 ft)	Phrae Province	
Pang Tub Khob Tunnel		120.09 m (394.0 ft)	Uttaradit Province	The shortest railway tunnel in Thailand.

== See also ==
- Rail transport in Thailand
- Lopburi Line: railway line of the Greater Bangkok commuter rail
- Northeastern Line (Thailand)
- Eastern Line (Thailand)
- Southern Line (Thailand)
