= Chiang Mai railway station =

Railway station in Chiang Mai Province, Thailand

Chiang Mai เชียงใหม่
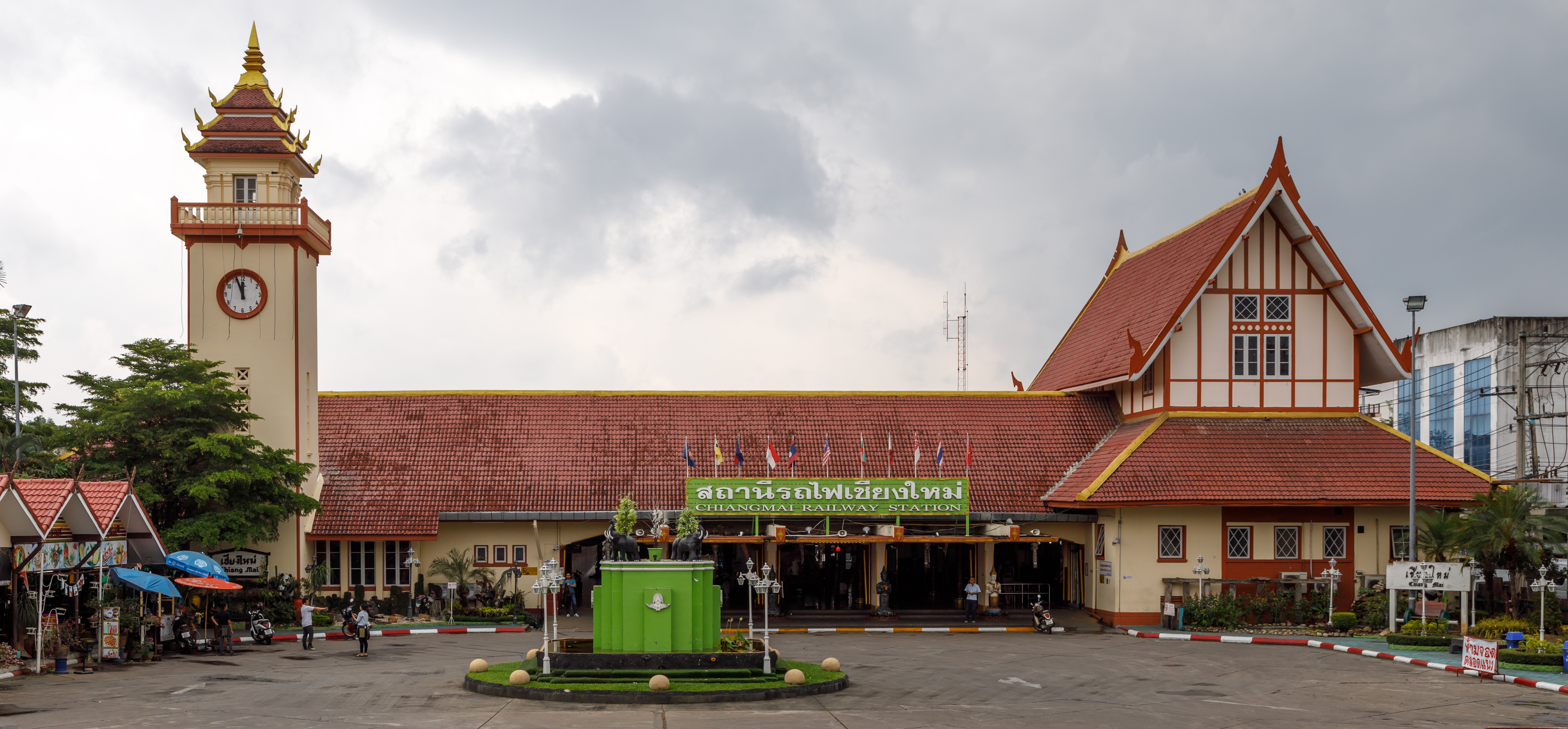

General information
- Location: Charoenmueang Road, Wat Ket Subdistrict, Chiang Mai; Chiang Mai Province; Thailand
- Coordinates: 18°47′01″N 99°01′01″E
- Operator: State Railway of Thailand
- Manager: Ministry of Transport
- Line: Chiang Mai Main Line
- Distance: 751.42 km (466.9 mi) from Bangkok
- Platforms: 4
- Tracks: 7

Construction
- Structure type: At-grade
- Parking: Yes

Other information
- Station code: ชม., CGM
- Classification: Class 1

History
- Opened: 1 January 1922; 104 years ago
- Rebuilt: 1945; 81 years ago

Services
Preceding station	State Railway of Thailand	Following station
Saraphi towards Hua Lamphong or Krung Thep Aphiwat	Northern Line	Terminus
Location

Chiang Mai station (SRT Code: CGM) (Thai: สถานีเชียงใหม่ (ชม.)) is a 1st class station and the main railway station of Chiang Mai Province. This station is on the east side of the Ping River in the city of Chiang Mai. There are 10 daily trains, not including Eastern & Oriental Express trains servicing this station. There are also four to six special trains for New Year, Songkran and other special festivals. In the 2004 census, Chiang Mai station served nearly 800,000 passengers.

== Gallery ==
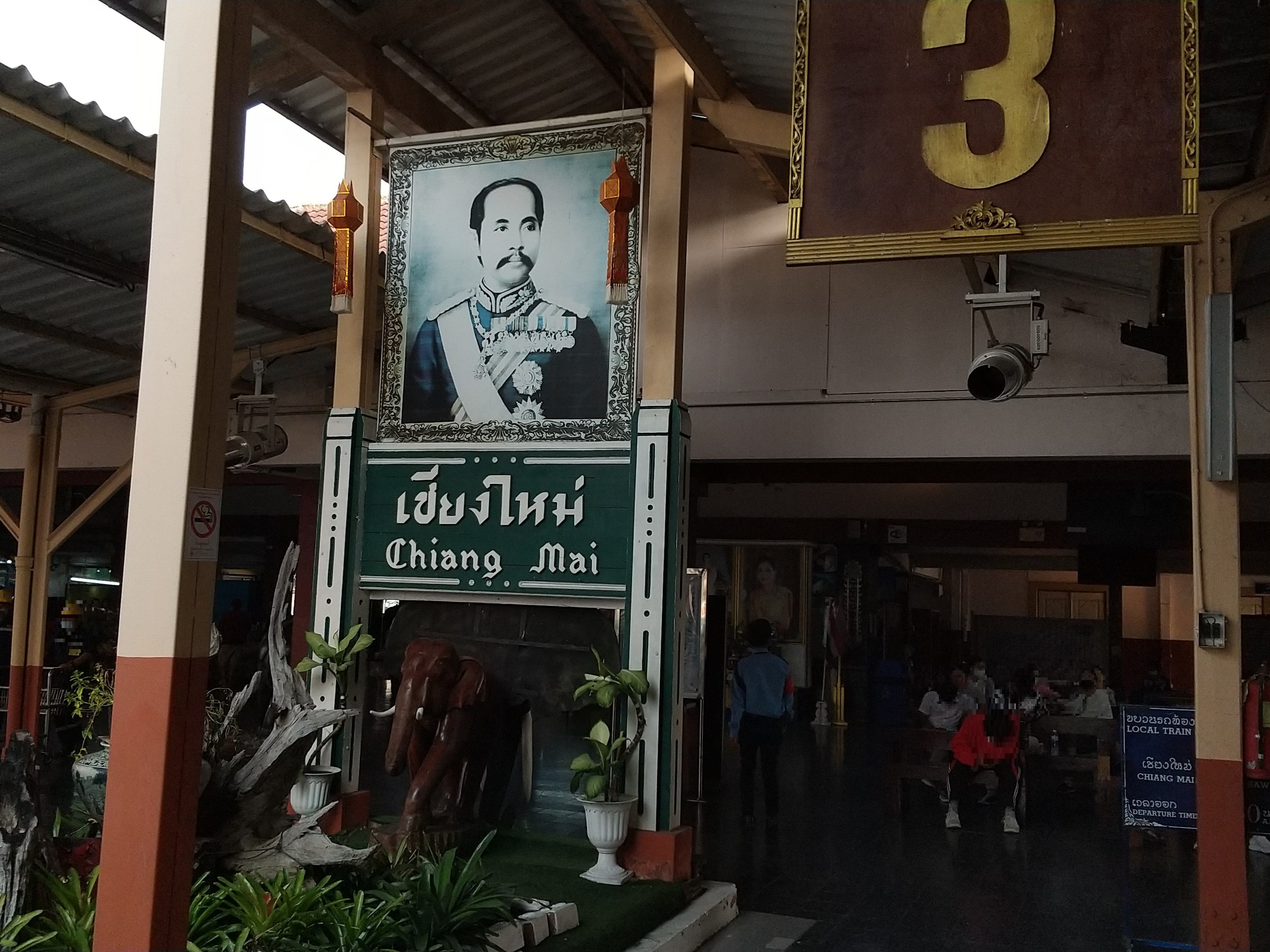
Station sign with portrait of King Chulalongkorn

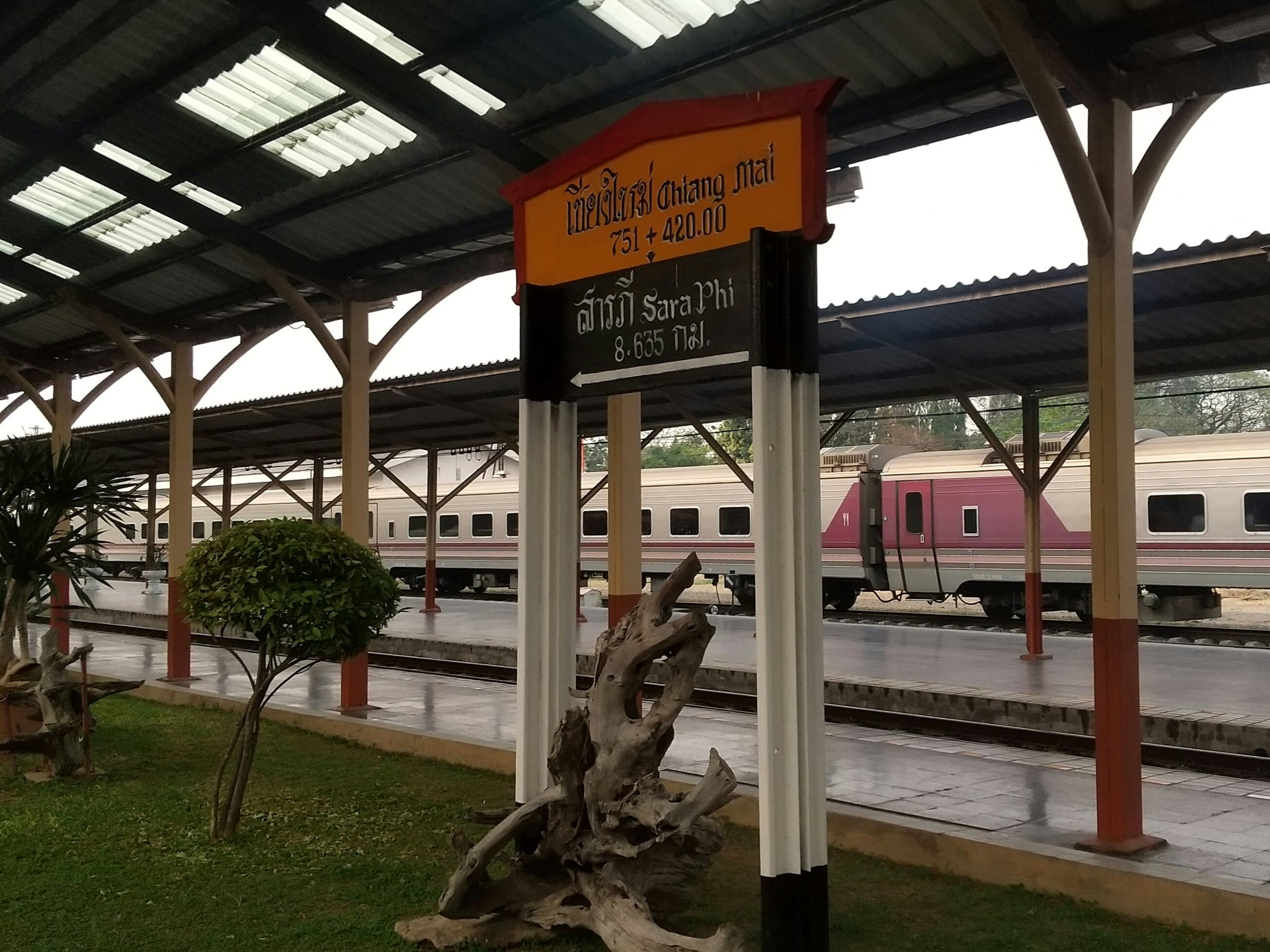
Adjacet station signage

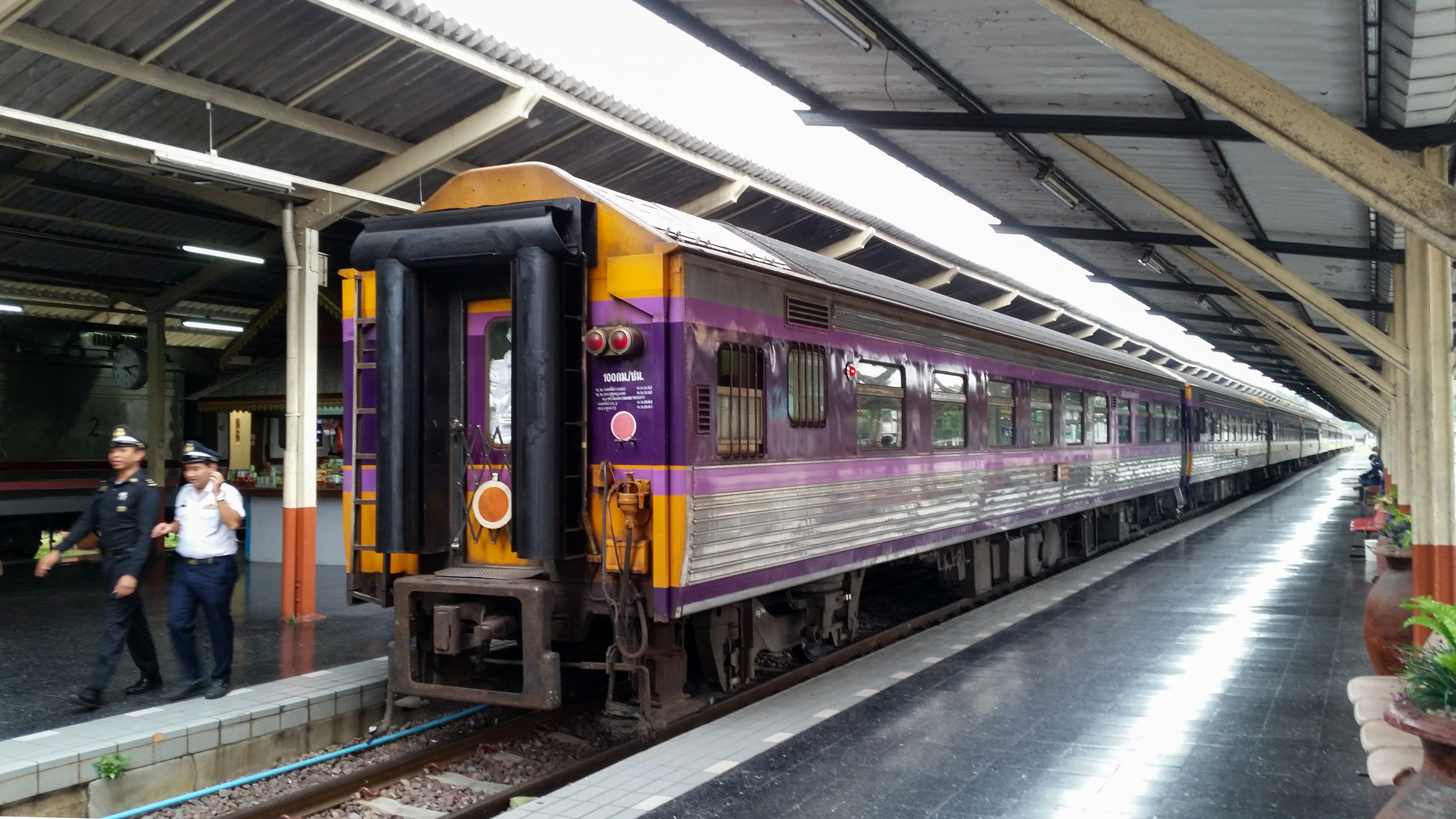
Platforms

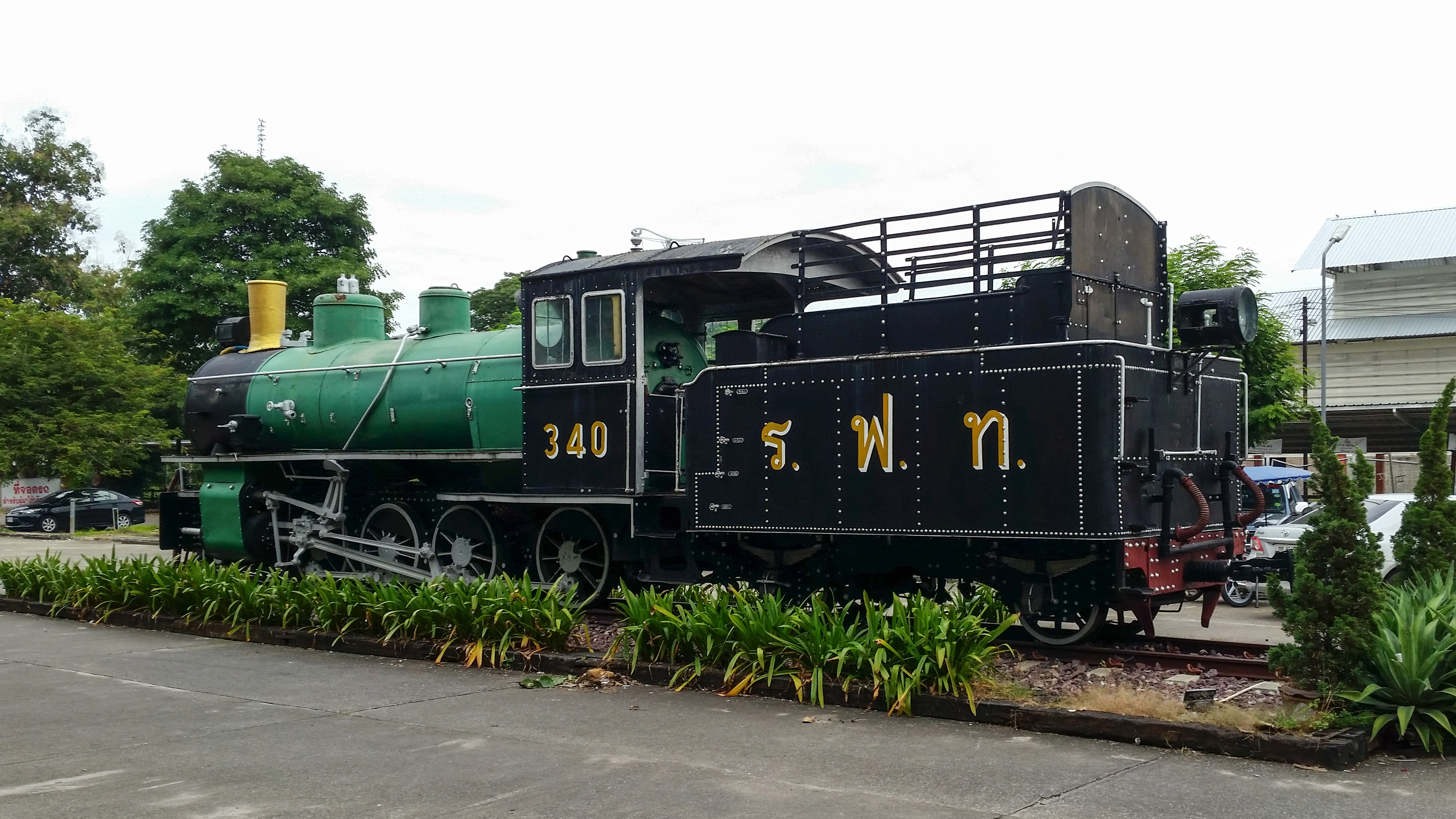
Steam locomotive on display in front of the station

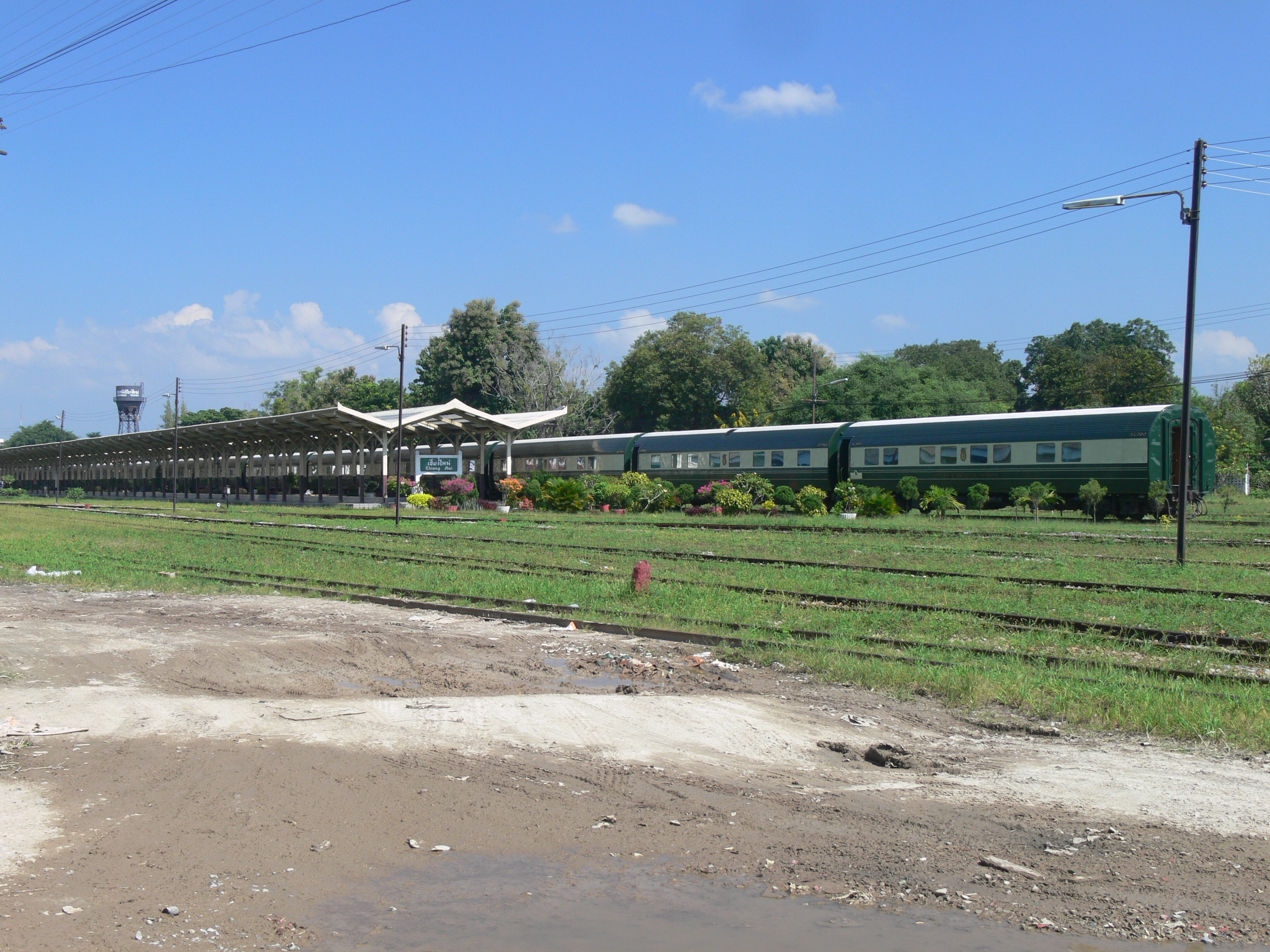
Station yard
