= Wat Samian Nari station =

Railway station in Thailand

Wat Samian Nari วัดเสมียนนารี
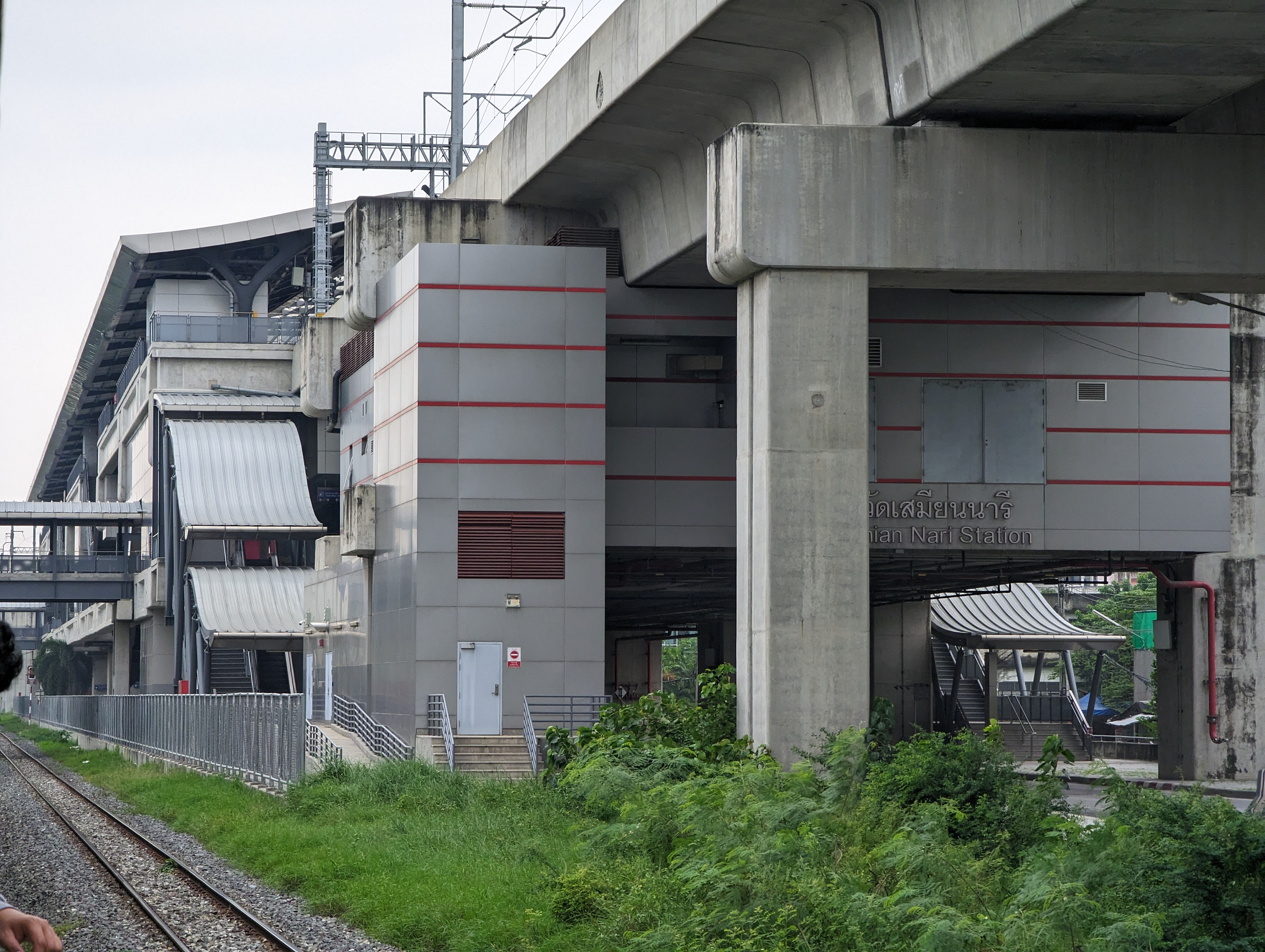

General information
- Location: Lat Yao Subdistrict, Chatuchak District; Bangkok; Thailand
- Coordinates: 13°50′29″N 100°33′27″E
- Operator: State Railway of Thailand
- Manager: Ministry of Transport
- Platforms: 2
- Tracks: 4

Construction
- Structure type: Elevated
- Parking: Yes
- Cycle facilities: Yes

Other information
- Station code: RN03

History
- Opened: 2 August 2021; 5 years ago
- Electrified: 25 kV 50 Hz AC overhead catenary

Services
Preceding station	SRT Red Lines	Following station
Chatuchak towards Krung Thep Aphiwat	Dark Red Line	Bang Khen towards Rangsit
Location

Wat Samian Nari Station (Thai: สถานีวัดเสมียนนารี) is a railway station in Chatuchak District, Bangkok. It serves the SRT Dark Red Line. It is located in front of Wat Samian Nari temple.

== History ==
In the past, there used to be a Wat Samian Nari railway halt on the Northern Line and Northeastern Line of the State Railway of Thailand. However, it was closed before 2000. A new elevated station was constructed and opened on 2 August 2021, following the opening of the SRT Dark Red Line.
