= Kan Kheha station =

Railway station in Bangkok, Thailand

Kan Kheha การเคหะ
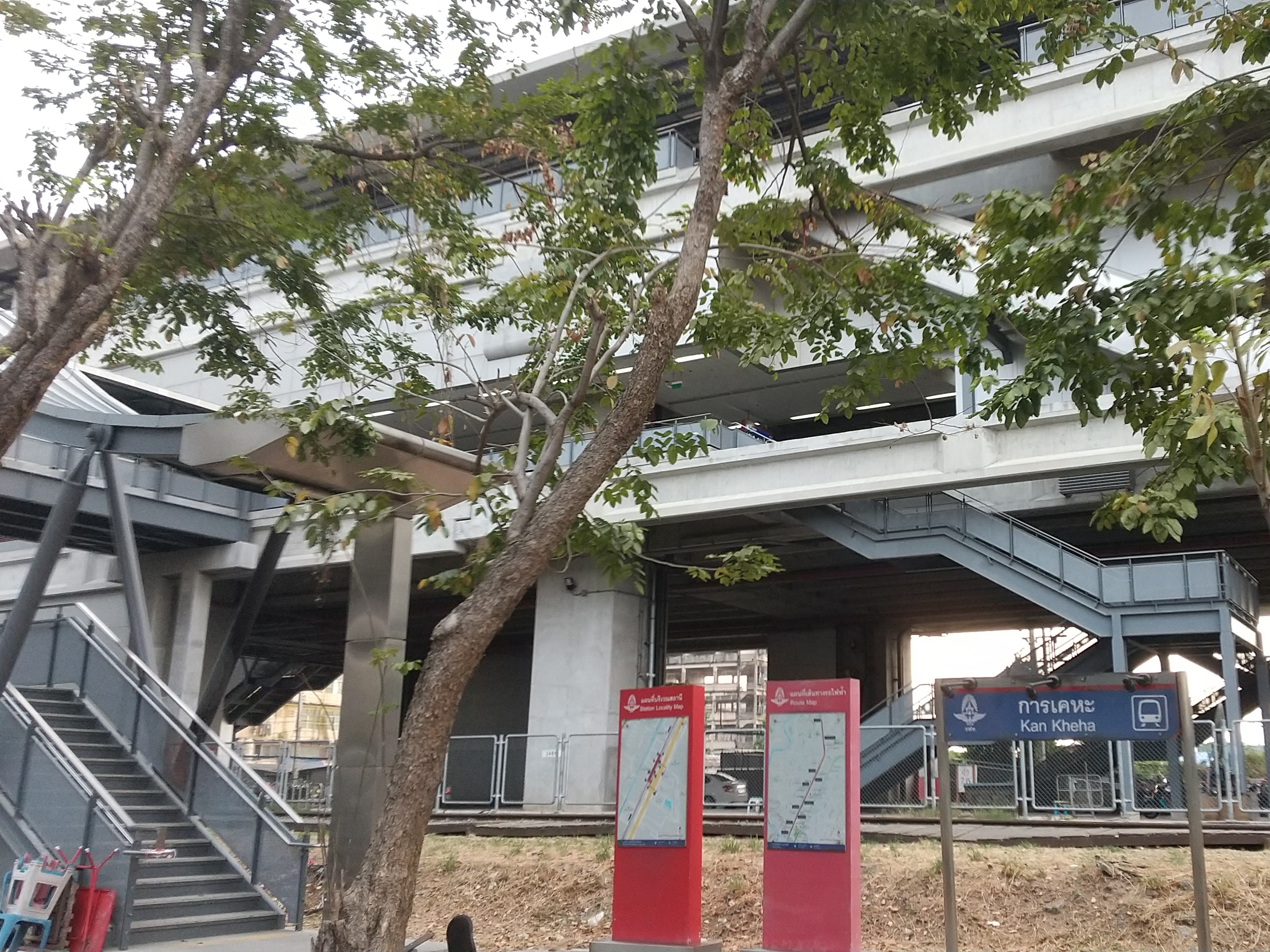

General information
- Location: Sanambin Subdistrict, Don Mueang District, Bangkok; Central Region; Thailand
- Operator: State Railway of Thailand
- Manager: Ministry of Transport
- Platforms: 2
- Tracks: 2

Construction
- Structure type: Elevated
- Parking: Yes
- Cycle facilities: Yes

Other information
- Station code: RN07

History
- Opened: 2 August 2021; 5 years ago
- Closed: 19 January 2023; 3 years ago (Kan Kheha KM.19 Halt)
- Electrified: 25 kV 50 Hz AC overhead catenary

Services
Preceding station	SRT Red Lines	Following station
Lak Si towards Krung Thep Aphiwat	Dark Red Line	Don Mueang towards Rangsit
Location

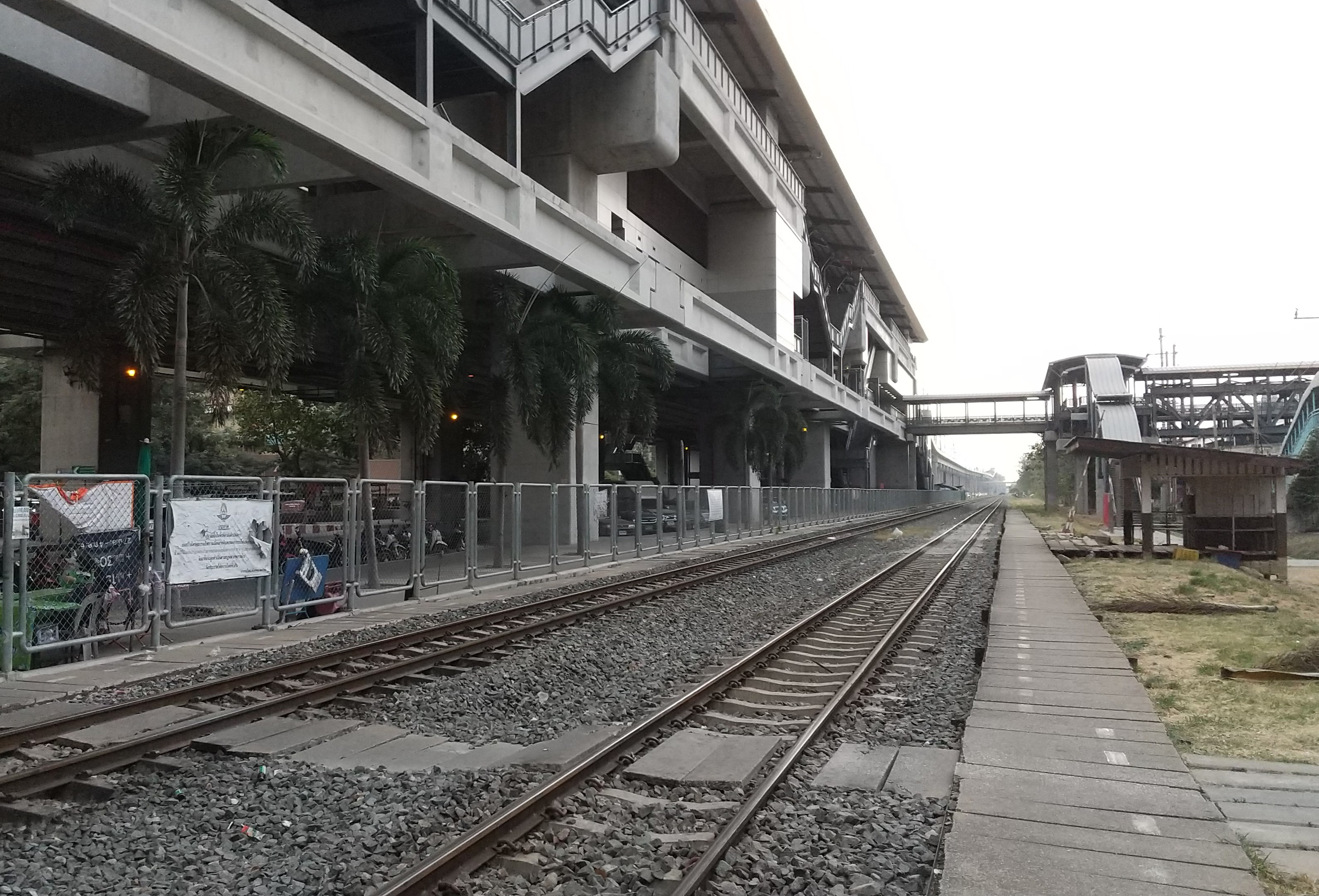
Former Kan Kheha KM.19 halt

Kan Kheha station (Thai: สถานีการเคหะ) is a railway station in Don Mueang District, Bangkok. It serves the SRT Dark Red Line. Kan Kheha station was built above the existing Kan Kheha KM.19 ground-level railway halt on the State Railway of Thailand's Northern and Northeastern Main Line which primarily served commuter trains.

== History ==
The station opened on 2 August 2021 following the opening of the SRT Dark Red Line. Kan Kheha KM.19 Halt closed on 19 January 2023 after all services started operating on the elevated tracks.
