= Bang Khen station =

Railway station in Bangkok, Thailand

Bang Khen บางเขน
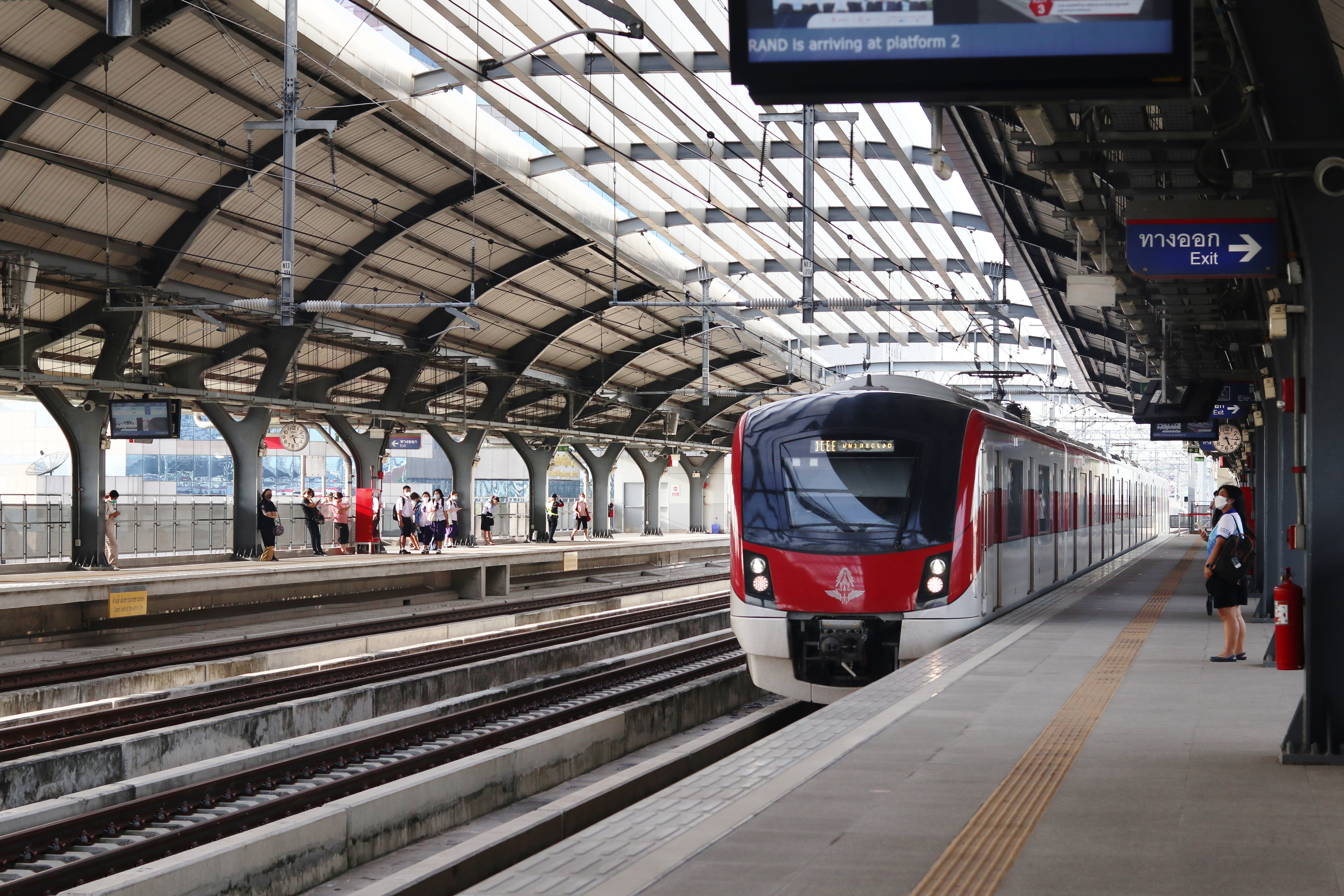

General information
- Location: Lat Yao, Chatuchak; Bangkok; Thailand
- Coordinates: 13.8493°N 100.5618°E
- Operator: State Railway of Thailand
- Manager: Ministry of Transport
- Platforms: 2
- Tracks: 4

Construction
- Structure type: Elevated
- Parking: Yes
- Cycle facilities: Yes

Other information
- Station code: RN04

History
- Opened: 2 August 2021; 5 years ago (elevated)
- Closed: 19 January 2023; 3 years ago (ground)
- Electrified: 25 kV 50 Hz AC overhead catenary

Services
Preceding station	SRT Red Lines	Following station
Wat Samian Nari towards Krung Thep Aphiwat	Dark Red Line	Thung Song Hong towards Rangsit
Location

Bang Khen Station (Thai: สถานีบางเขน) is a railway station in Bangkok, serving the SRT Dark Red Line. Although the station is named Bang Khen, it is not located in the present-day Bang Khen district. It is located in Chatuchak district since Chatuchak separated from Bang Khen district in 1989.

== History ==
Bang Khen opened as a railway station on the Northern and Northeastern Line in the early 1900s. The original station structure was demolished in 1990 during the construction of the failed Hopewell BERTS project.

The new elevated station opened on 2 August 2021. The ground-level station closed on 19 January 2023 and long-distance trains stopped operating from the station entirely.

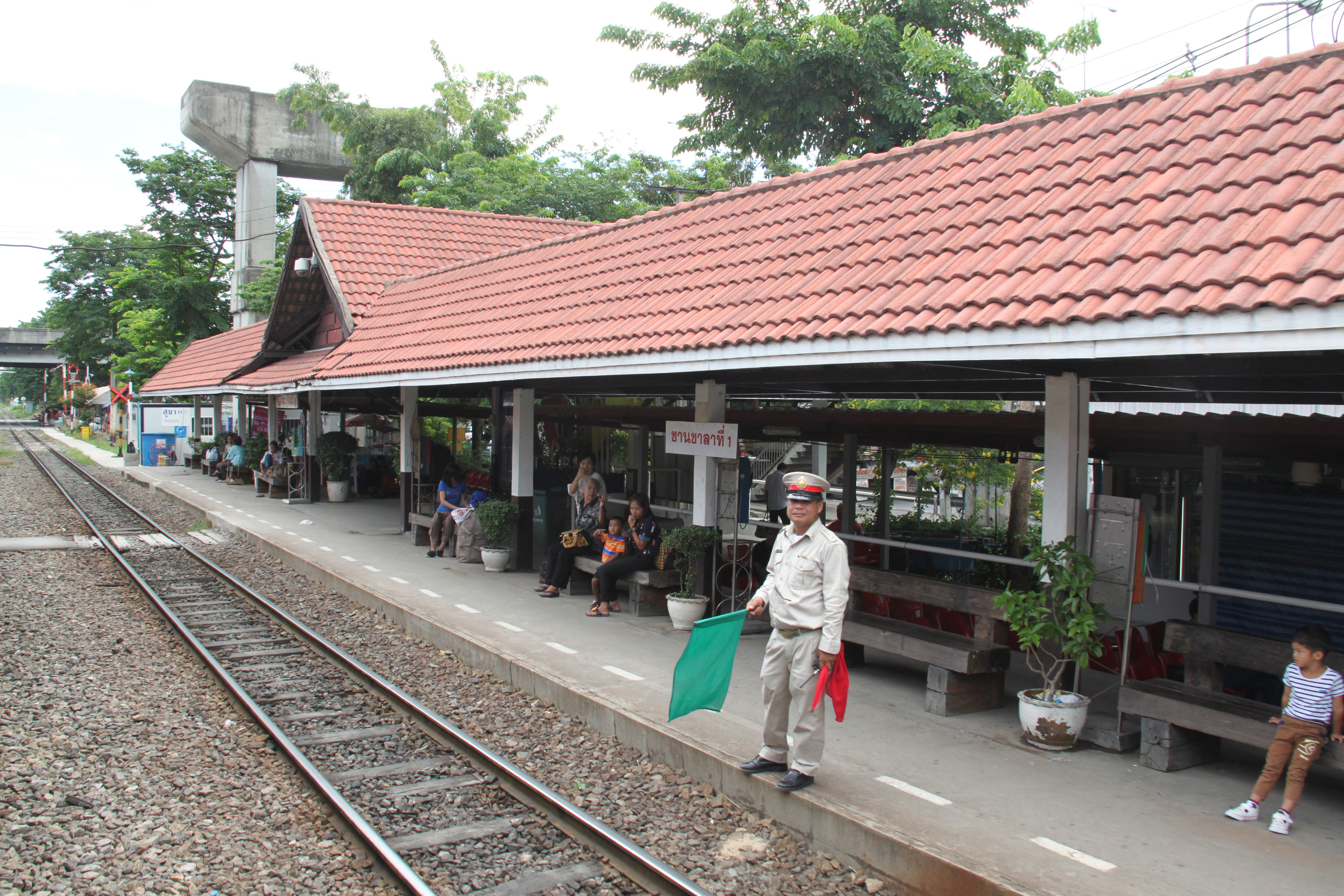
Former ground-level railway station, serving the Northern and Northeastern lines

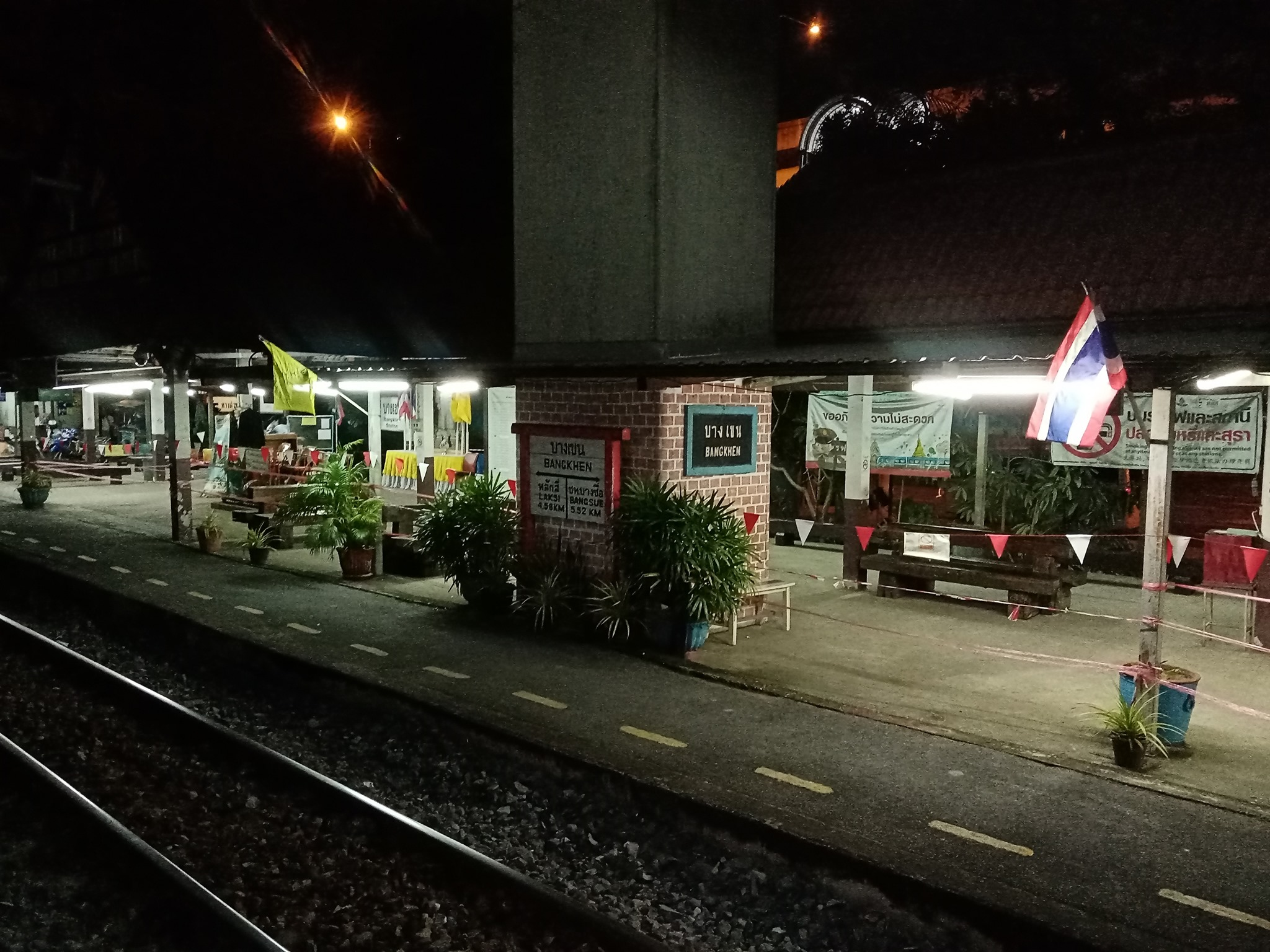
Former at-grade station signage

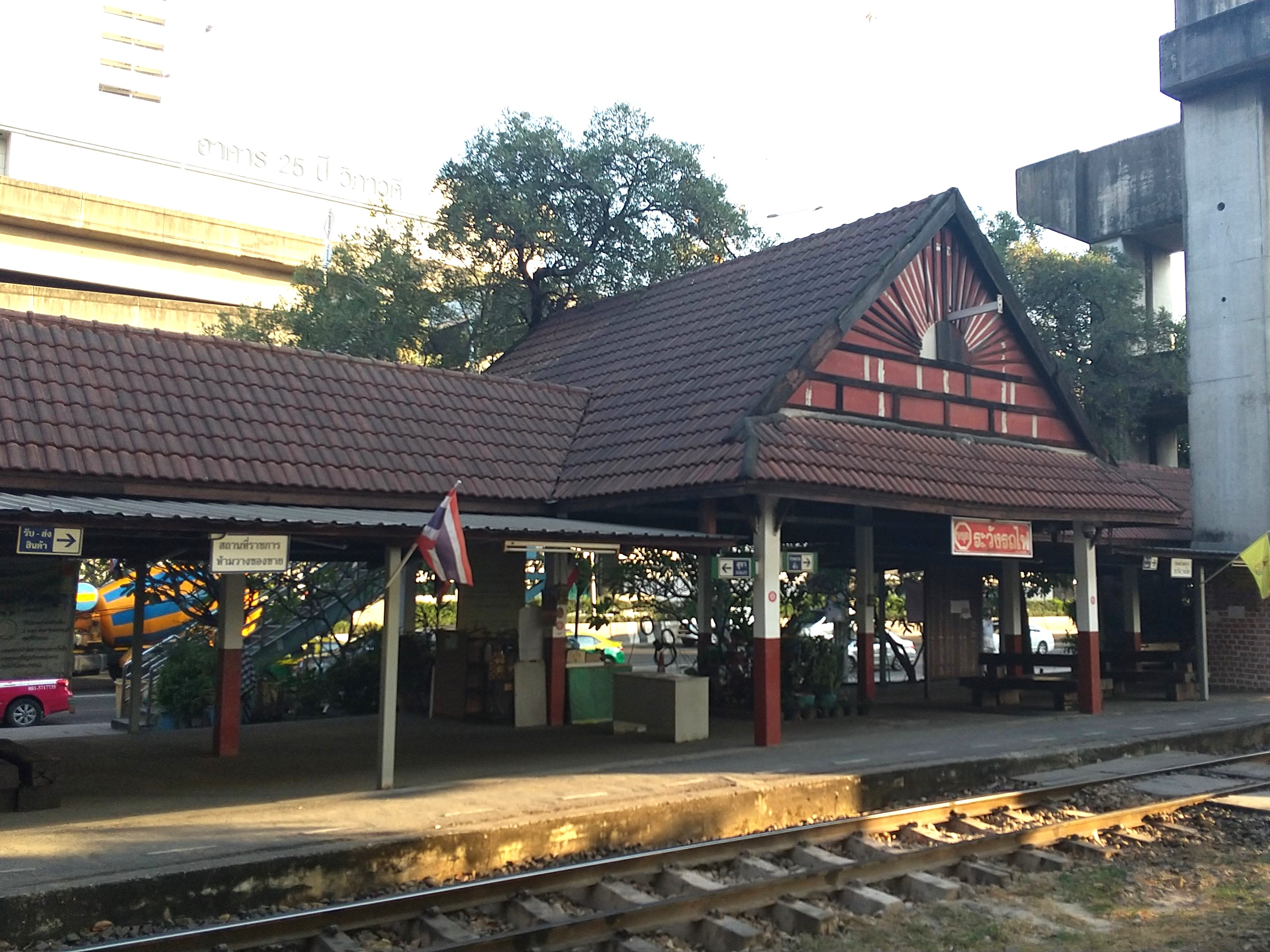
Old station Building.

== Gallery ==
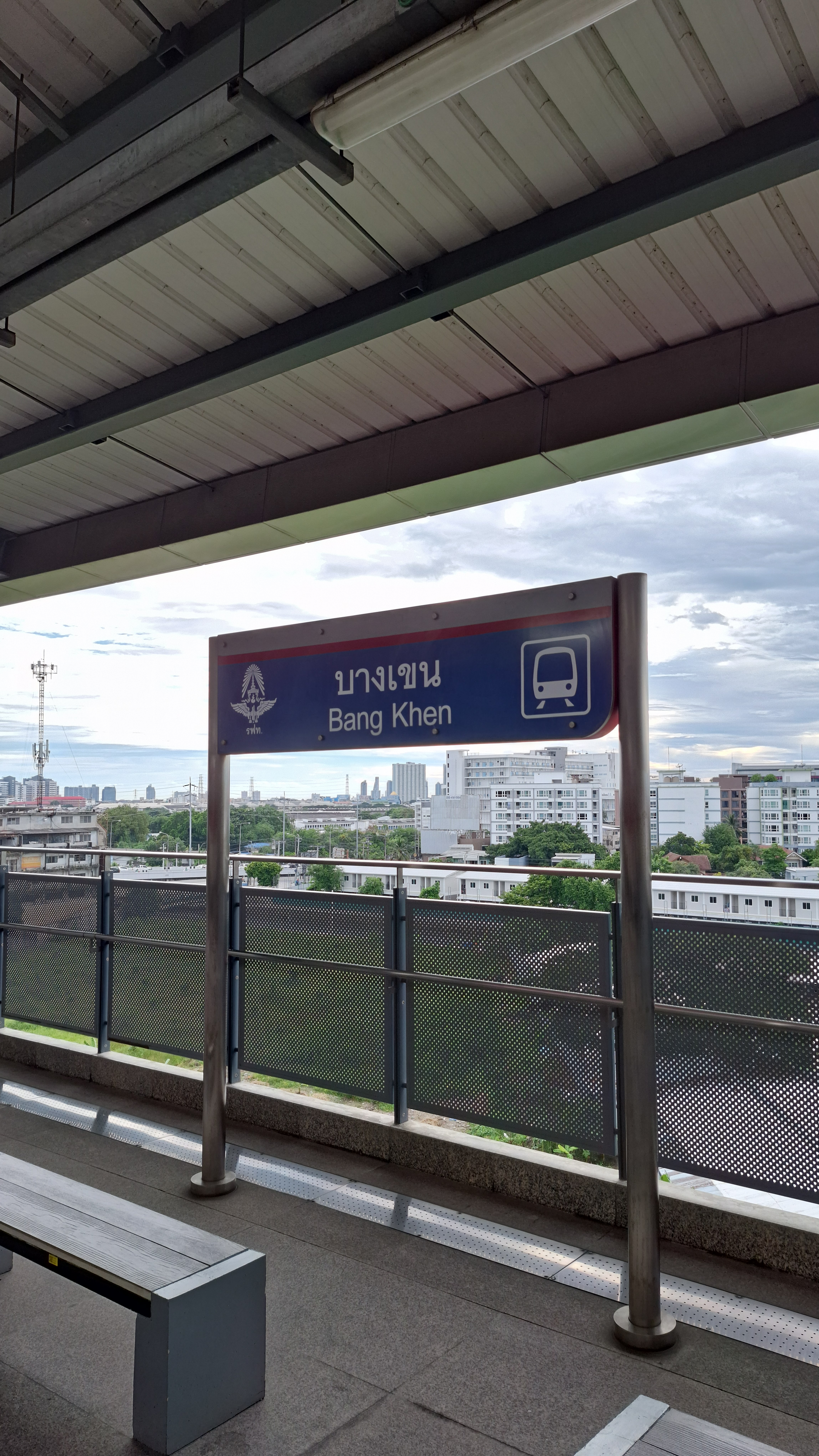
Station sign

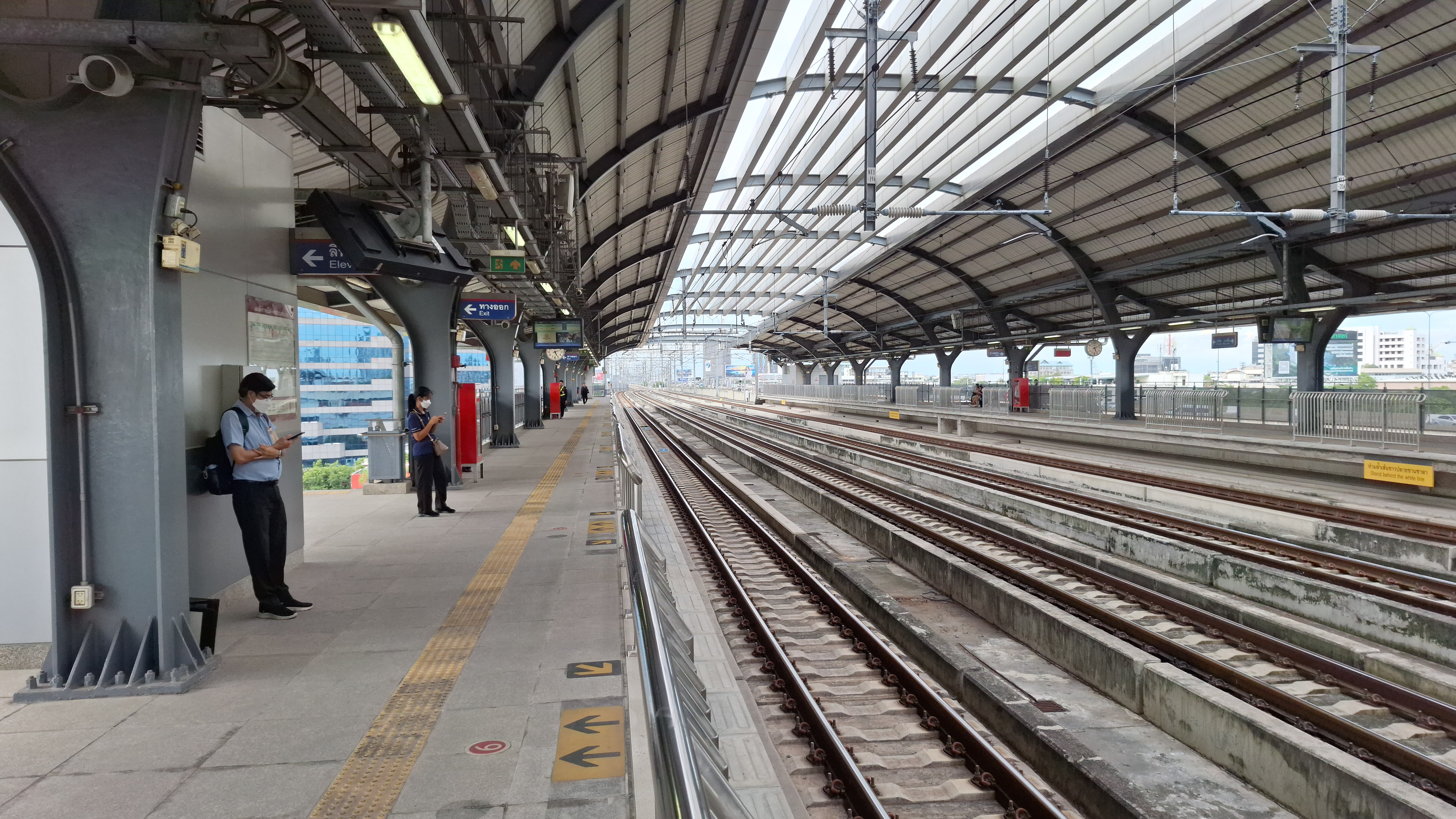
Station platform (Towards Rangsit side).

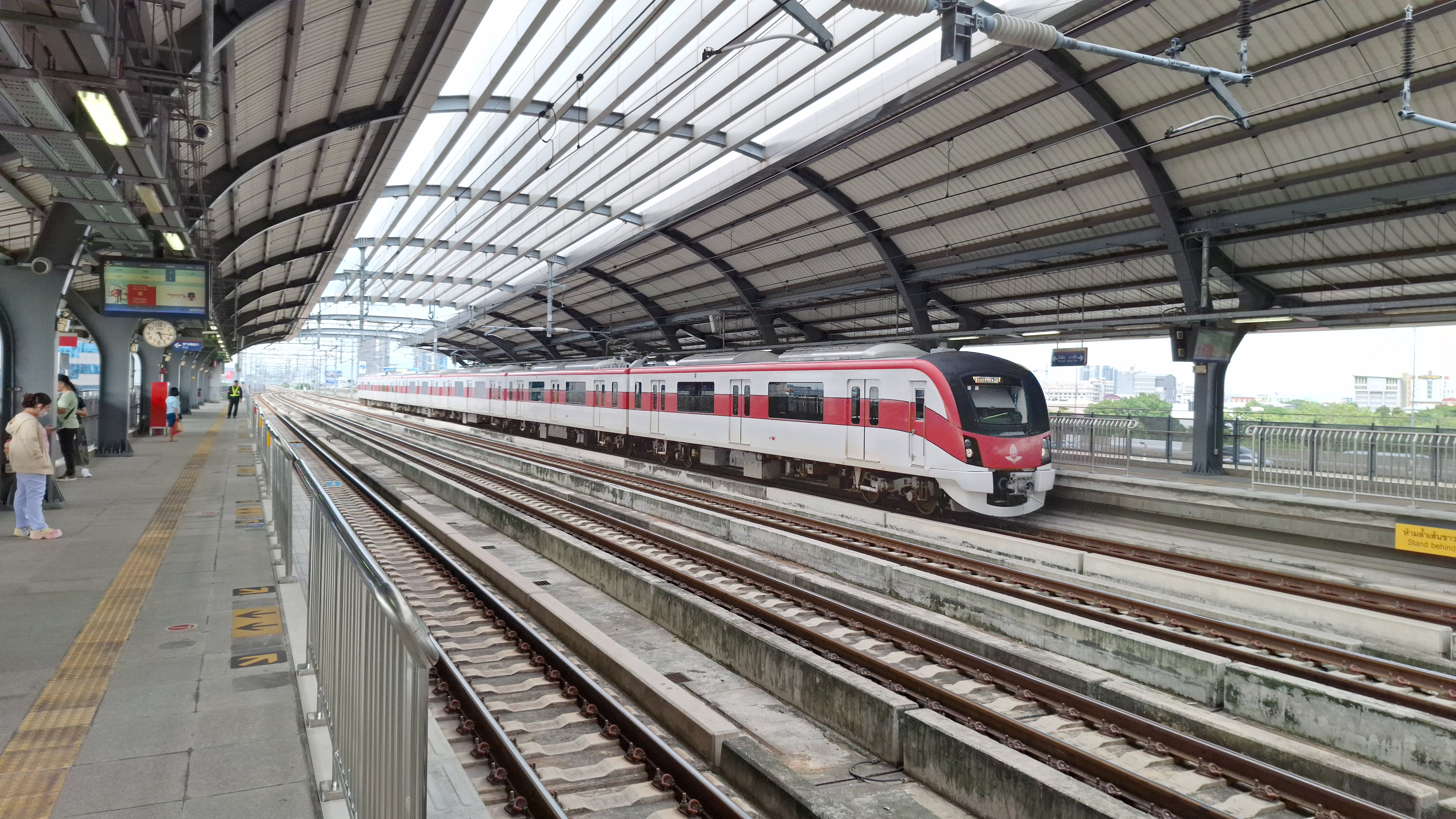
6 car train arriving at Bang Khen station.
