= Chiang Rak railway station =

Railway station in Thailand

Coordinates: 14°03′19.3″N 100°35′33.9″E

Chiang Rak เชียงราก
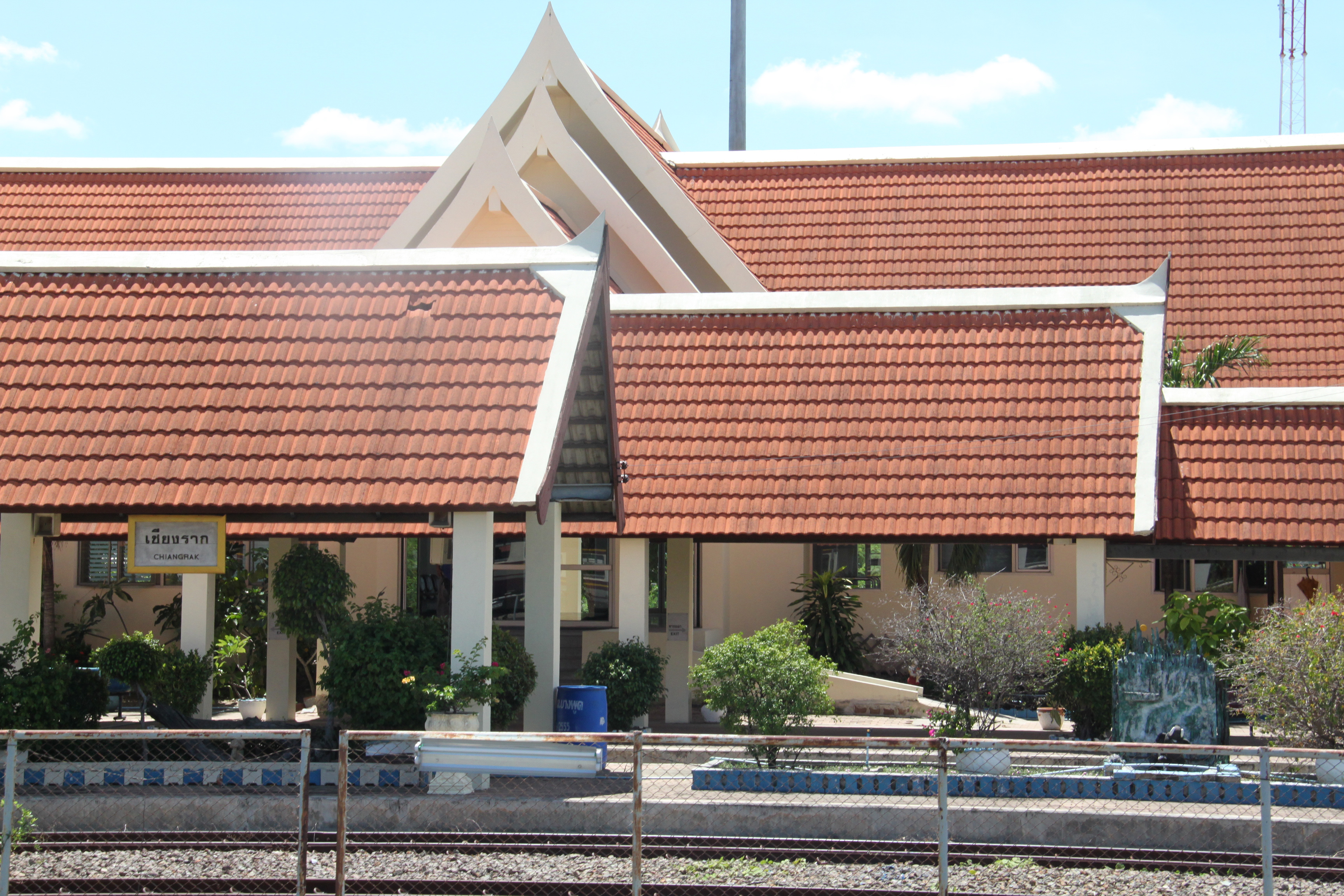

General information
- Location: 1 Moo 18 Phahonyothin Rd (Highway 1), Khlong Nueng Sub-District, Khlong Luang District, Pathum Thani Province; Central Thailand; Thailand
- Operator: State Railway of Thailand (SRT)
- Manager: Ministry of Transport
- Platforms: 8
- Tracks: 7
- Connections: Local transportation

Construction
- Structure type: At-grade
- Architectural style: Applied Thai

Other information
- Station code: ชร.
- Classification: Class 2

Services
Preceding station	State Railway of Thailand	Following station
Khlong Nhung Halt towards Hua Lamphong or Krung Thep Aphiwat	Northern Line	Thammasat University Halt towards Chiang Mai
Khlong Nhung Halt towards Hua Lamphong or Krung Thep Aphiwat	Northeastern Line	Thammasat University Halt towards Ubon Ratchathani or Khamsavath (Laos)
Preceding station	SRT Red Lines	Following station
Planned
Bangkok University towards Krung Thep Aphiwat	Dark Red Line	Thammasat University towards Rangsit
Location

Chiang Rak (Thai: สถานีรถไฟเชียงราก) is a railway station in the central Thailand, located in Khlong Nueng Sub-District, Khlong Luang District, Pathum Thani Province, outskirts Bangkok. The station will also serve the SRT Dark Red Line as part of the Northern Extension, scheduled to open in 2028.

It is a class 2 railway station 37.47 km (23.28 mi) from Hua Lamphong (Bangkok railway station). This station is served by the songthaew (Thai-style minibus) to Thammasat University Rangsit Campus, because it is the closest station to this higher education institution.

Its name "Chiang Rak" comes from its location that was called "Chiang Rak", which is an area in the north of Pathum Thani adjacent to the southern part of Ayutthaya as far as reaching Sing Buri. In the past it was an extensive plain, covering 38,000 rai (6,100 ha; 15,000 acres) called "Thung Chiang Rak" (ทุ่งเชียงราก). The word "Chiang Rak" is derived from the fact that in the past it was a place where elephants dragged logs through, locals therefore popularly called "Chang Lak" (ช้างลาก). Later, distorted as Chiang Rak.

The area near the station is also the location of the tenth milestone of Khlong Prem Prachakon, the khlong that was canalized in the reign of King Chulalongkorn (Rama V) from Bangkok to Ayutthaya.

The station was upgraded in 1998 as Thammasat University Rangsit Campus was selected as one of the venues for the 13th Asian Games in the same year. The distinguishing feature of the station is applied Thai-style building complex and A-shaped gables designed in harmony with the logo of the 13th Asian Games.
