= Chatuchak station =

Railway station in Bangkok, Thailand

Chatuchak จตุจักร
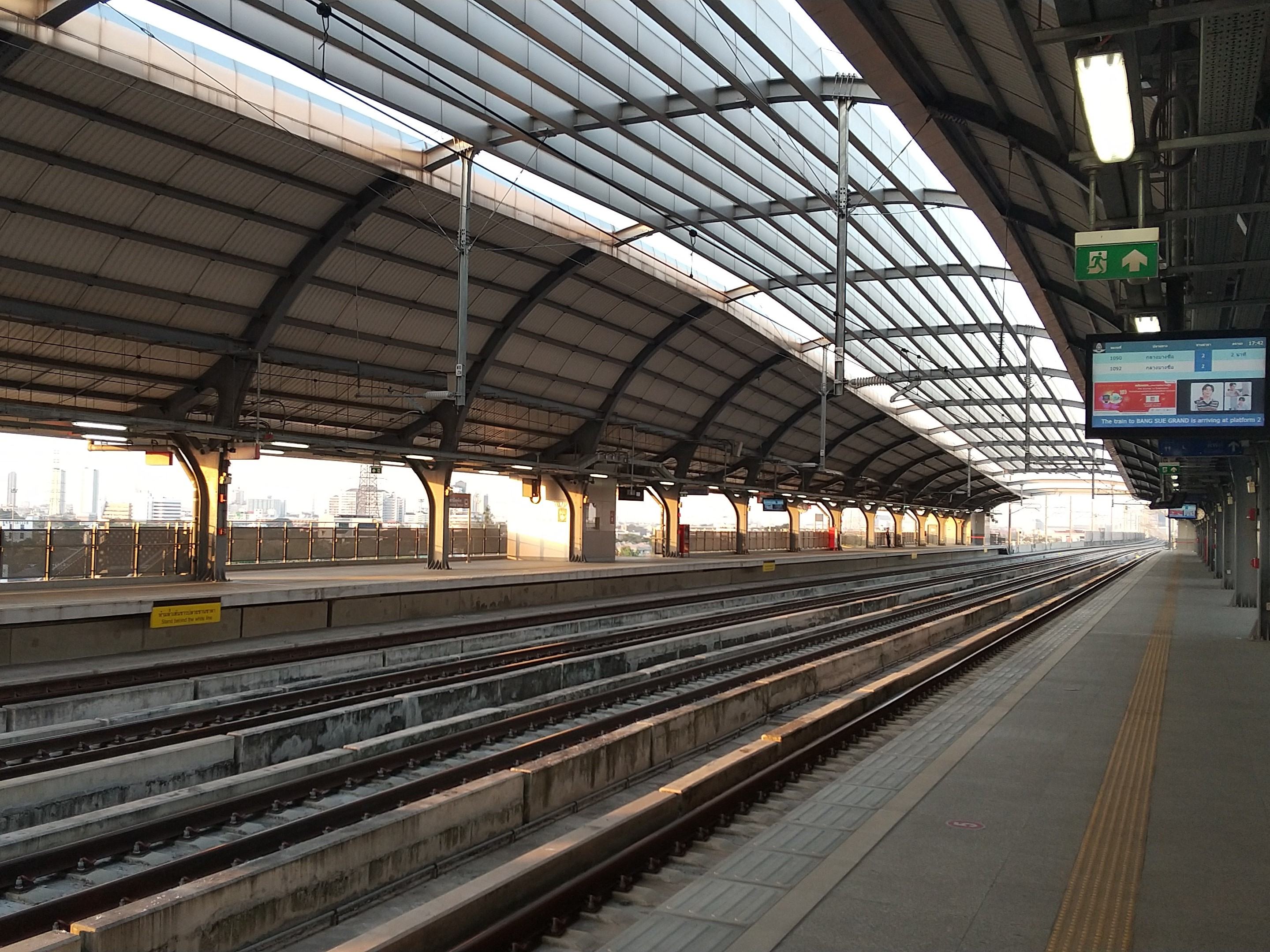
- Elevated platforms of Chatuchak Station

General information
- Location: Chatuchak Subdistrict, Chatuchak District, Bangkok; Central Region; Thailand
- Operator: State Railway of Thailand
- Manager: Ministry of Transport
- Platforms: 2
- Tracks: 2

Construction
- Structure type: Elevated
- Parking: Yes
- Cycle facilities: Yes

Other information
- Station code: RN02

History
- Opened: 2 August 2021; 5 years ago
- Closed: 19 January 2023; 3 years ago (Nikhom Rotfai KM.11 Halt)
- Electrified: 25 kV 50 Hz AC overhead catenary

Services
Preceding station	SRT Red Lines	Following station
Krung Thep Aphiwat Terminus	Dark Red Line	Wat Samian Nari towards Rangsit
Location

Chatuchak Station (Thai: สถานีจตุจักร) is a railway station in Chatuchak District, Bangkok. It serves the SRT Dark Red Line. Chatuchak station was built above the existing Nikhom Rotfai KM.11 ground-level railway halt on the State Railway of Thailand's Northern and Northeastern Main Line which primarily served commuter trains.

== History ==
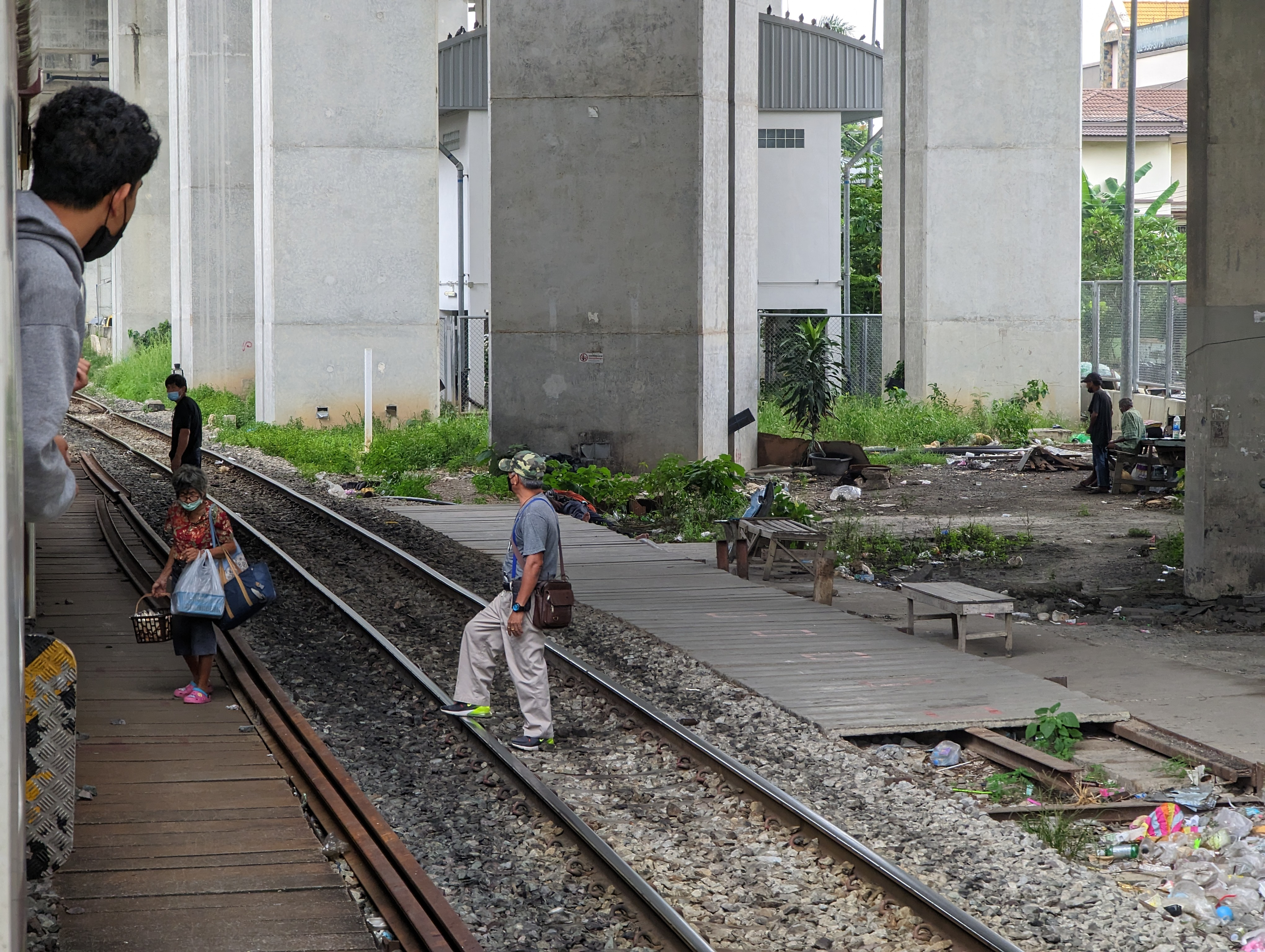
Former Nikhom Rotfai KM.11 halt

Chatuchak station was initially named KM.11 station to match the halt, but was later changed. The station opened on 2 August 2021 following the opening of the SRT Dark Red Line. The Nikhom Rotfai KM.11 Halt was closed on 19 January 2023 after all services started operating on the elevated tracks.
