= Don Mueang railway station =

Railway station in Bangkok, Thailand

Don Mueang ดอนเมือง
- SRT Dark Red Line platforms

General information
- Location: Sanambin Subdistrict, Don Mueang District; Bangkok; Thailand
- Coordinates: 13.919727°N 100.601072°E
- Operator: State Railway of Thailand (SRT)
- Manager: Ministry of Transport
- Platforms: 8
- Tracks: 8

Construction
- Structure type: Elevated
- Platform levels: 4

Other information
- Station code: ดม., RN08
- Classification: Class 1

History
- Opened: 26 March 1896; 130 years ago (at-grade); 2 August 2021; 5 years ago (elevated)
- Closed: 19 January 2023 (at-grade)

Services
Preceding station	State Railway of Thailand	Following station
Krung Thep Aphiwat Terminus	Northern Line long-distance services	Rangsit towards Chiang Mai
Krung Thep Aphiwat Terminus	Northeastern Line long-distance services	Rangsit towards Ubon Ratchathani or Khamsavath (Laos)
Bang Sue Junction towards Hua Lamphong	Northern Line ordinary and commuter services	Rangsit towards Chiang Mai
Bang Sue Junction towards Hua Lamphong	Northeastern Line ordinary and commuter services	Rangsit towards Ubon Ratchathani or Khamsavath (Laos)
Preceding station	SRT Red Lines	Following station
Kan Kheha towards Krung Thep Aphiwat	Dark Red Line	Lak Hok (Rangsit University) towards Rangsit
Proposed
Preceding station	Airport Rail Link	Following station
Terminus	High-Speed Rail Linking Three Airports	Krung Thep Aphiwat towards U-Tapao
Location

Don Mueang station (Thai: สถานีดอนเมือง, pronounced [sā.tʰǎː.nīː dɔ̄ːn mɯ̄aŋ], RTGS: Sathani Don Mueang) is a railway station in Bangkok. It is located opposite of Don Mueang International Airport. It currently serves the SRT Dark Red Line and long-distance intercity trains on the Northern and Northeastern Line of the State Railway of Thailand. There is a pedestrian bridge directly linking the new station to the airport.

== History ==
Don Mueang station opened in 1898 as part of Thailand's first railway between Bangkok and Ayutthaya. Its initial station structure was located on the airport side. However, this was moved after the construction of Vibhavadi Rangsit Road. A new station structure was constructed in 2013 in concordance with the construction of the SRT Dark Red Line. This new elevated station structure is located 700 meters from the original station, above the site of the former Talat Mai Don Mueang railway halt. There are two levels, whereby the lower four platforms are for long-distance intercity and commuter trains, while the upper four platforms are for the SRT Dark Red Line.

Dark Red Line services began running from the elevated station on 2 August 2021. Long distance trains started operating from the elevated station on 19 January 2023, with the at-grade station closing on the same day.

== Station layout ==
U4; Upper Platform Floor (suburban train)
U4; Upper Platform Floor (suburban train)	Platform 1	Dark Red Line toward Rangsit
U4; Upper Platform Floor (suburban train)	Island platform, doors open on the left/right.
U4; Upper Platform Floor (suburban train)	Platform 2	Dark Red Line toward Rangsit
U4; Upper Platform Floor (suburban train)	Platform 3	Dark Red Line toward Krung Thep Aphiwat
U4; Upper Platform Floor (suburban train)	Island platform, doors open on the left/right.
U4; Upper Platform Floor (suburban train)	Platform 4	Dark Red Line toward Krung Thep Aphiwat
U3; Lower Platform Level (Long-distance Train)
U3; Lower Platform Level (Long-distance Train)	Platform 5	Northern Line Northeastern Line toward Ban Phachi Junction
U3; Lower Platform Level (Long-distance Train)	Island platform, doors open on the left/right.
U3; Lower Platform Level (Long-distance Train)	Platform 6	Northern Line Northeastern Line toward Ban Phachi Junction
U3; Lower Platform Level (Long-distance Train)	Platform 7	Northern Line Northeastern Line toward Krung Thep Aphiwat and Bangkok (Hua Lamphong)
U3; Lower Platform Level (Long-distance Train)	Island platform, doors open on the left/right.
U3; Lower Platform Level (Long-distance Train)	Platform 8	Northern Line Northeastern Line toward Krung Thep Aphiwat and Bangkok (Hua Lamphong)
U2 ticket sales class	ticket sales floor	Exit 1-4, Passenger Service Center, Ticket Office, Ticket Machine, Webshop, Shop, Connecting Walkway to Don Mueang Airport
G Street level	-	Kamphaeng Phet 6 Road, Don Mueang Airport (Domestic Terminal), Don Mueang New Market

== Gallery ==
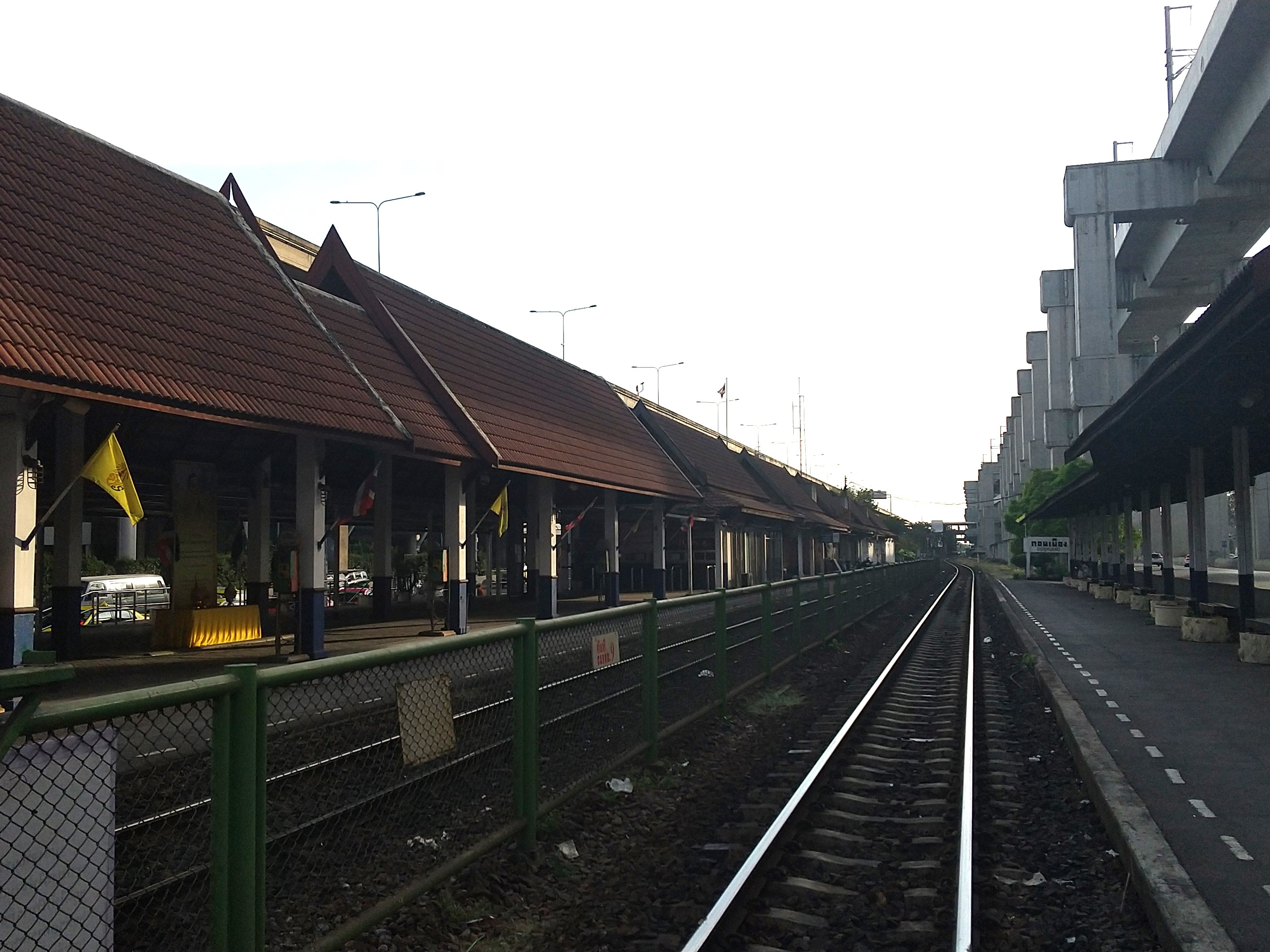
Former at-grade railway station

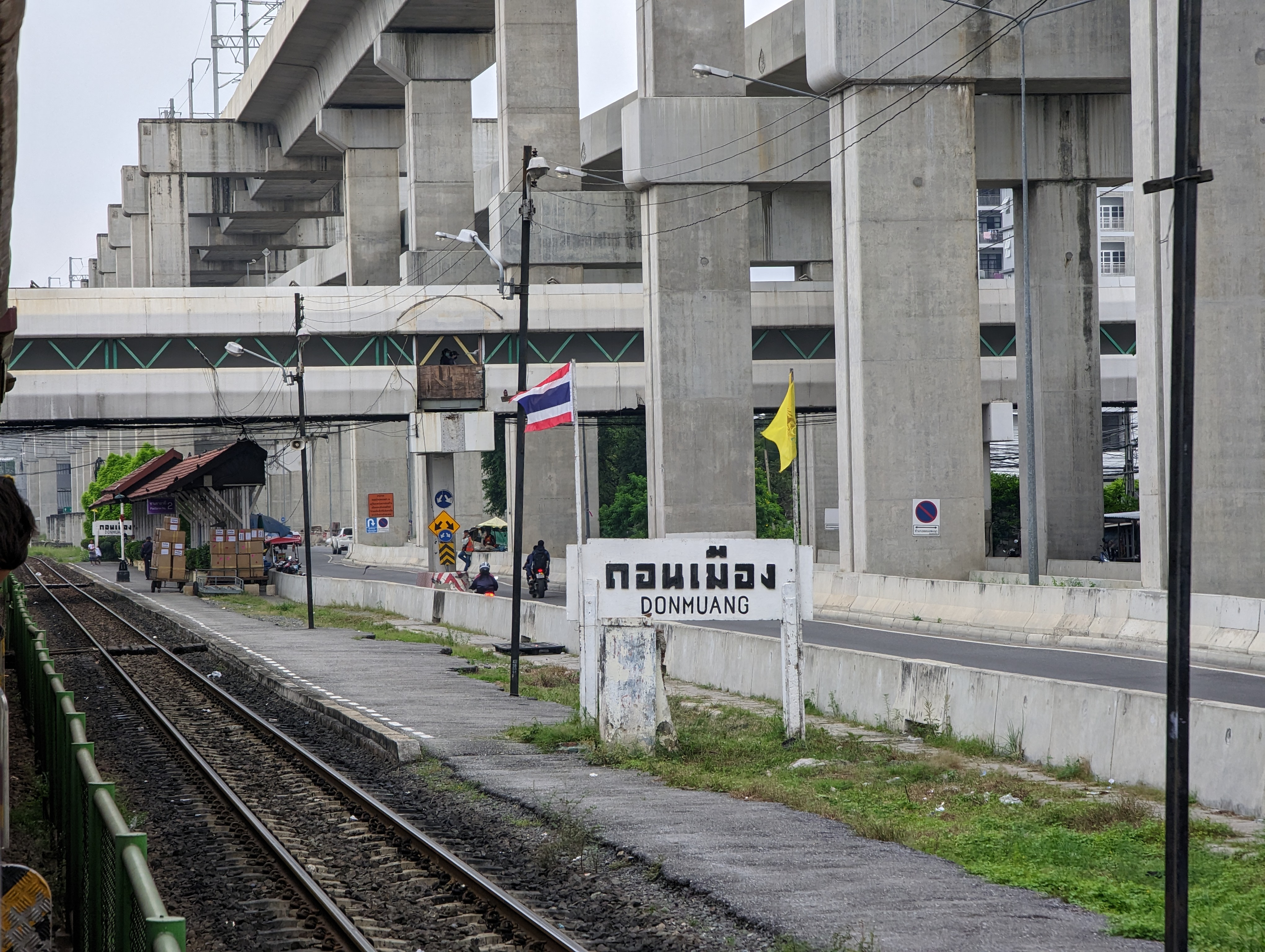
Former Don Mueang station signage

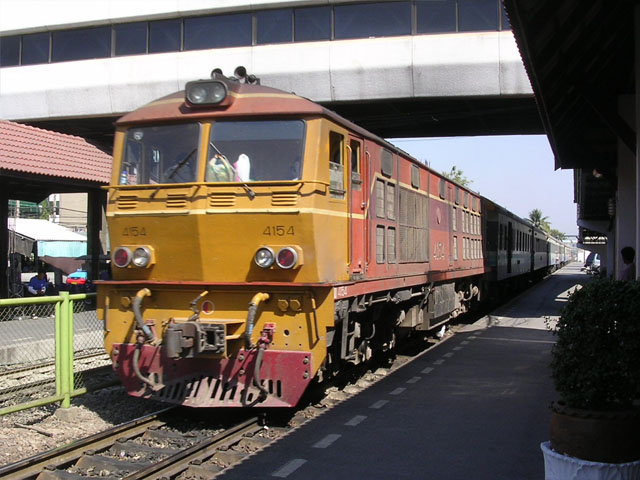
Alsthom ALS.4154 at the former Don Mueang station in 2004

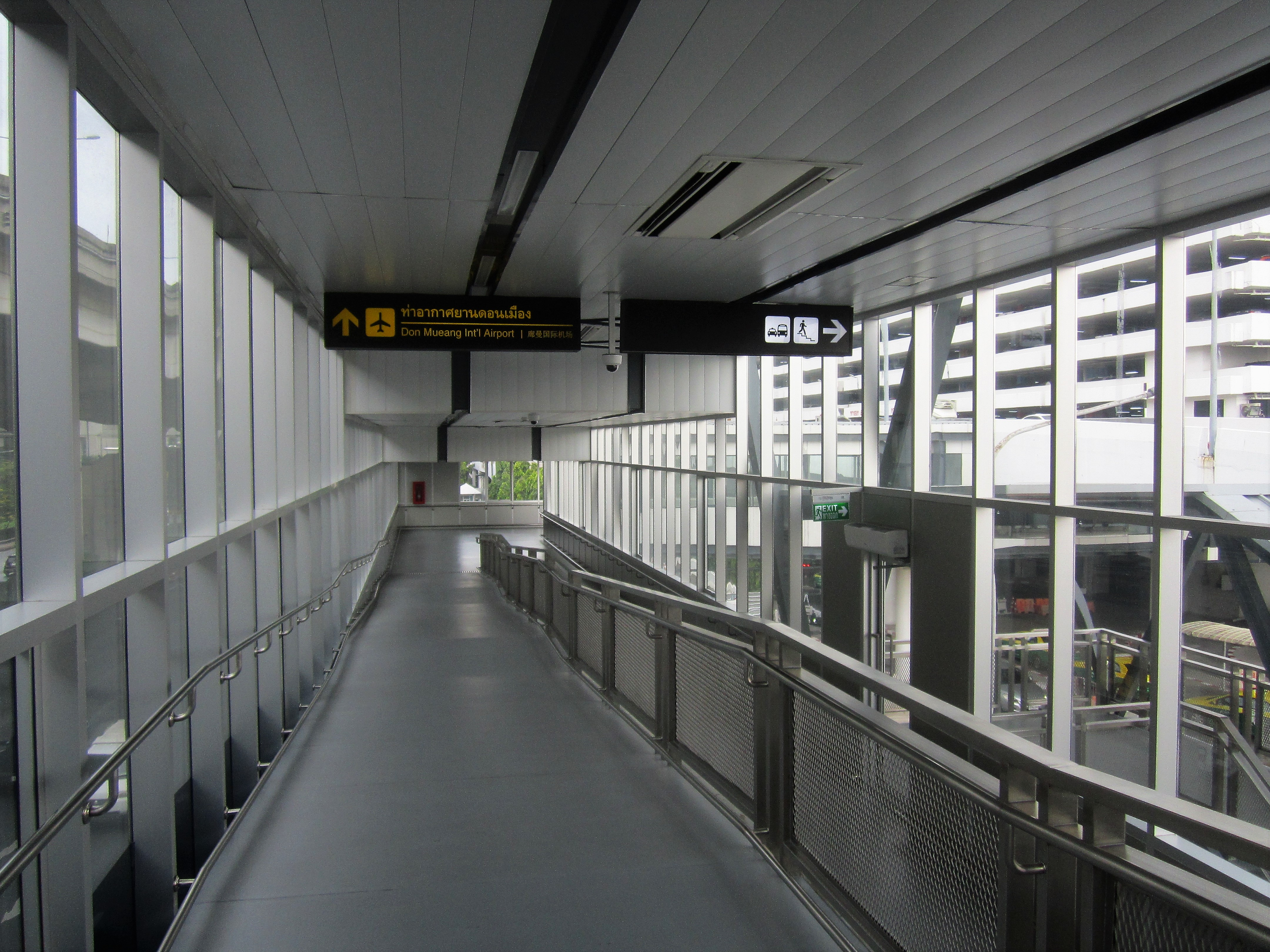
Connecting walkway from the airport to the railway station

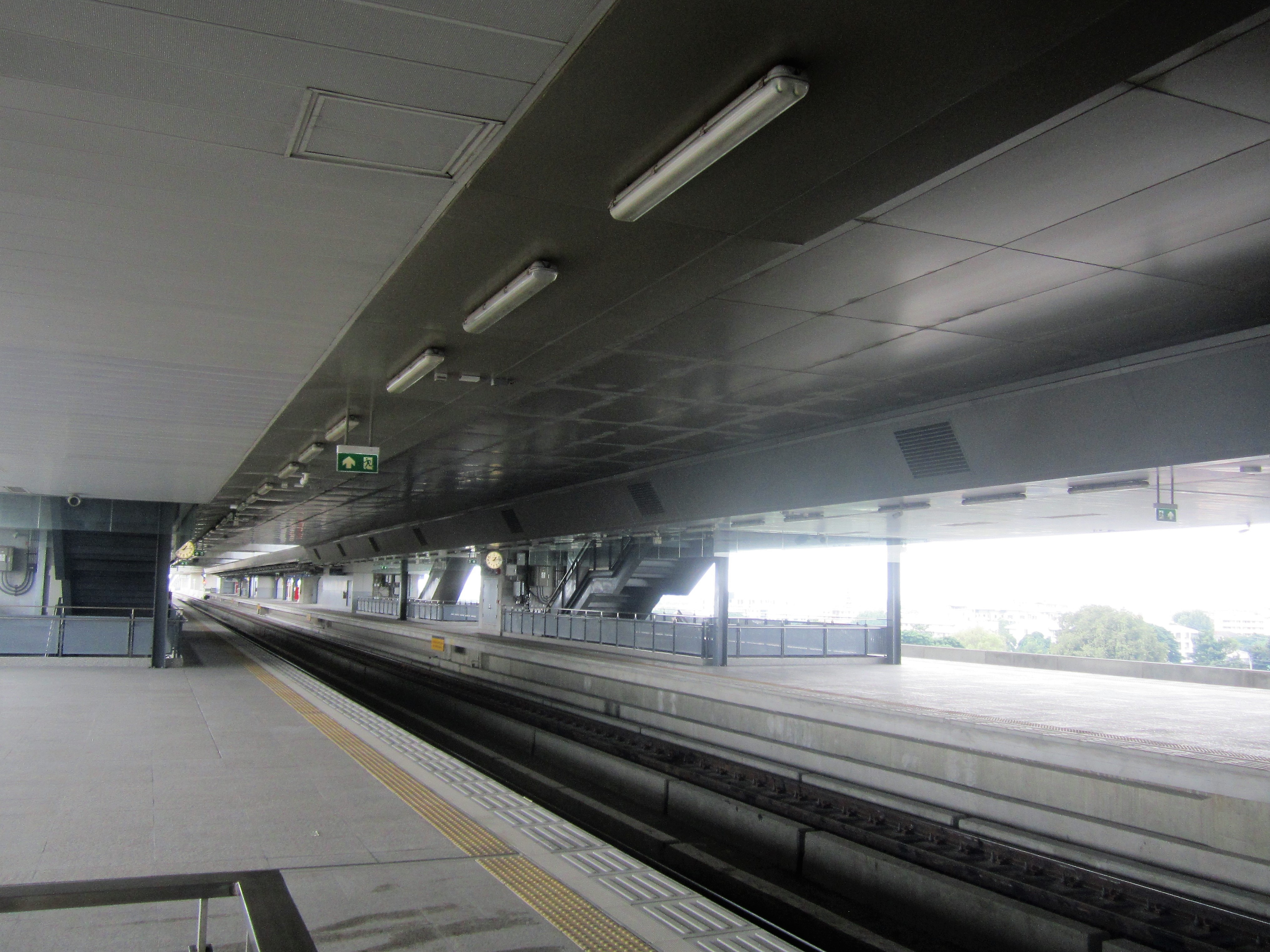
Long-distance services platform
