= Huai Rai railway station =

Railway station in Phrae, Thailand

Coordinates: 17.8860°N 100.0402°E

Huai Rai ห้วยไร่
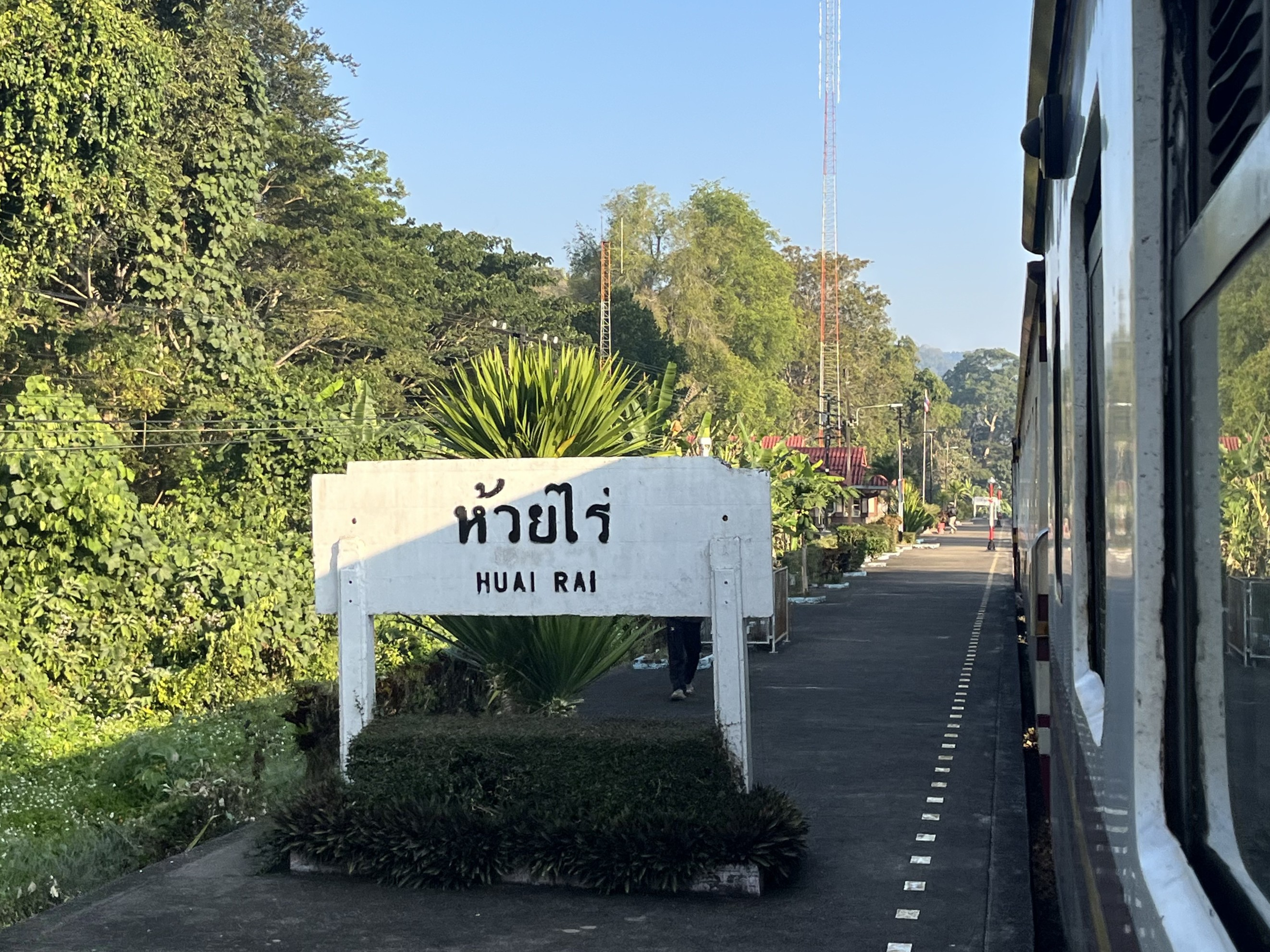
- Station in 2026

General information
- Location: Ban Huai Rai, Huai Rai Subdistrict, Den Chai District, Phrae
- Owner: State Railway of Thailand
- Line: Northern Line
- Platforms: 1
- Tracks: 2

Other information
- Station code: หว.

Services
Preceding station	State Railway of Thailand	Following station
Khao Phlueng Halt towards Hua Lamphong or Krung Thep Aphiwat	Northern Line	Rai Kled Dao Halt towards Chiang Mai
Location

Huai Rai railway station is a railway station located in Huai Rai Subdistrict, Den Chai District, Phrae. It is located 521.485 km from Bangkok railway station and is a class 3 railway station. It is on the Northern Line of the State Railway of Thailand.

== Gallery ==
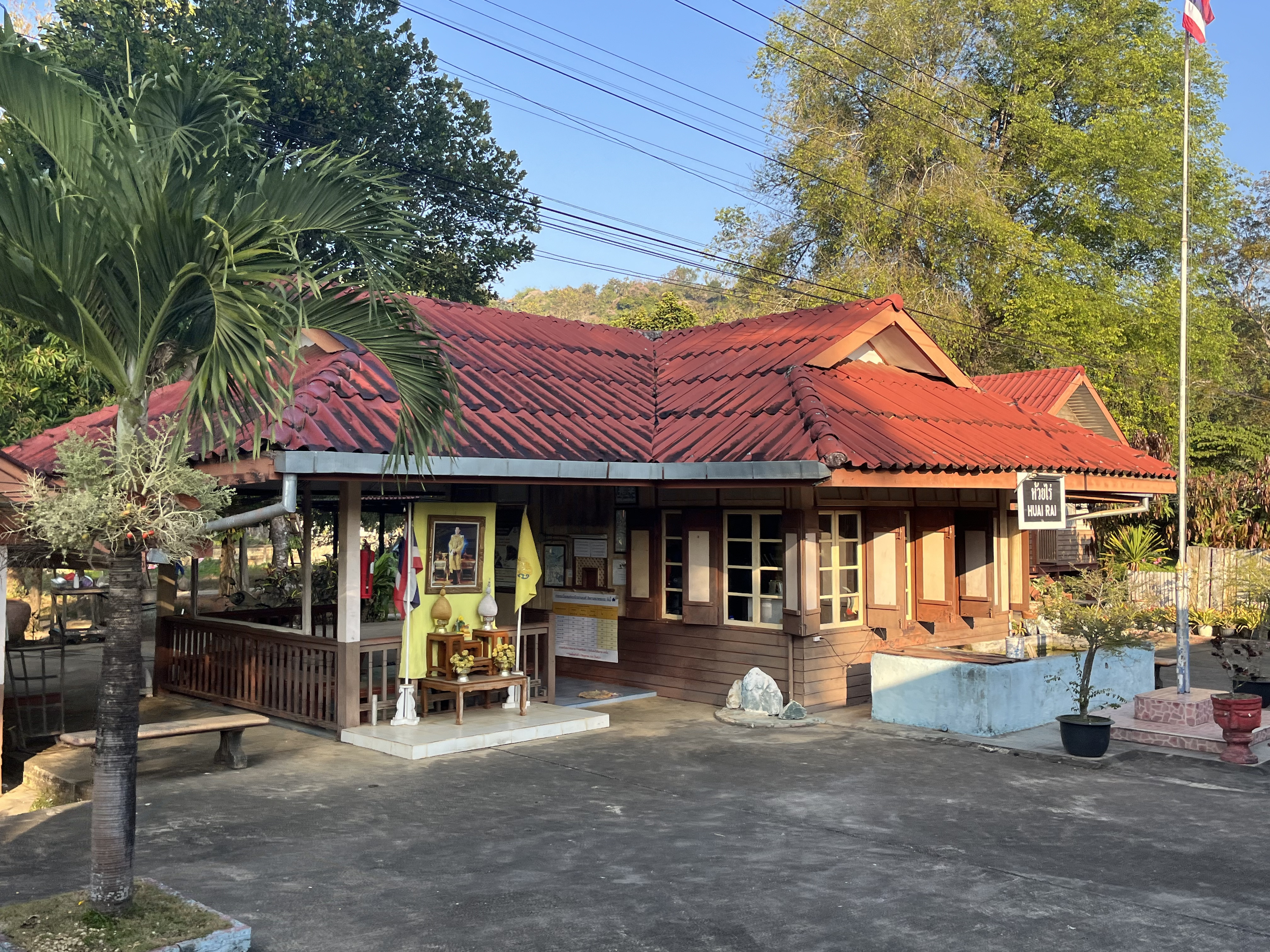
Station building
