= Dark Red Line (Bangkok) =

Mass rapid rail line in Thailand

SRT Dark Red Line

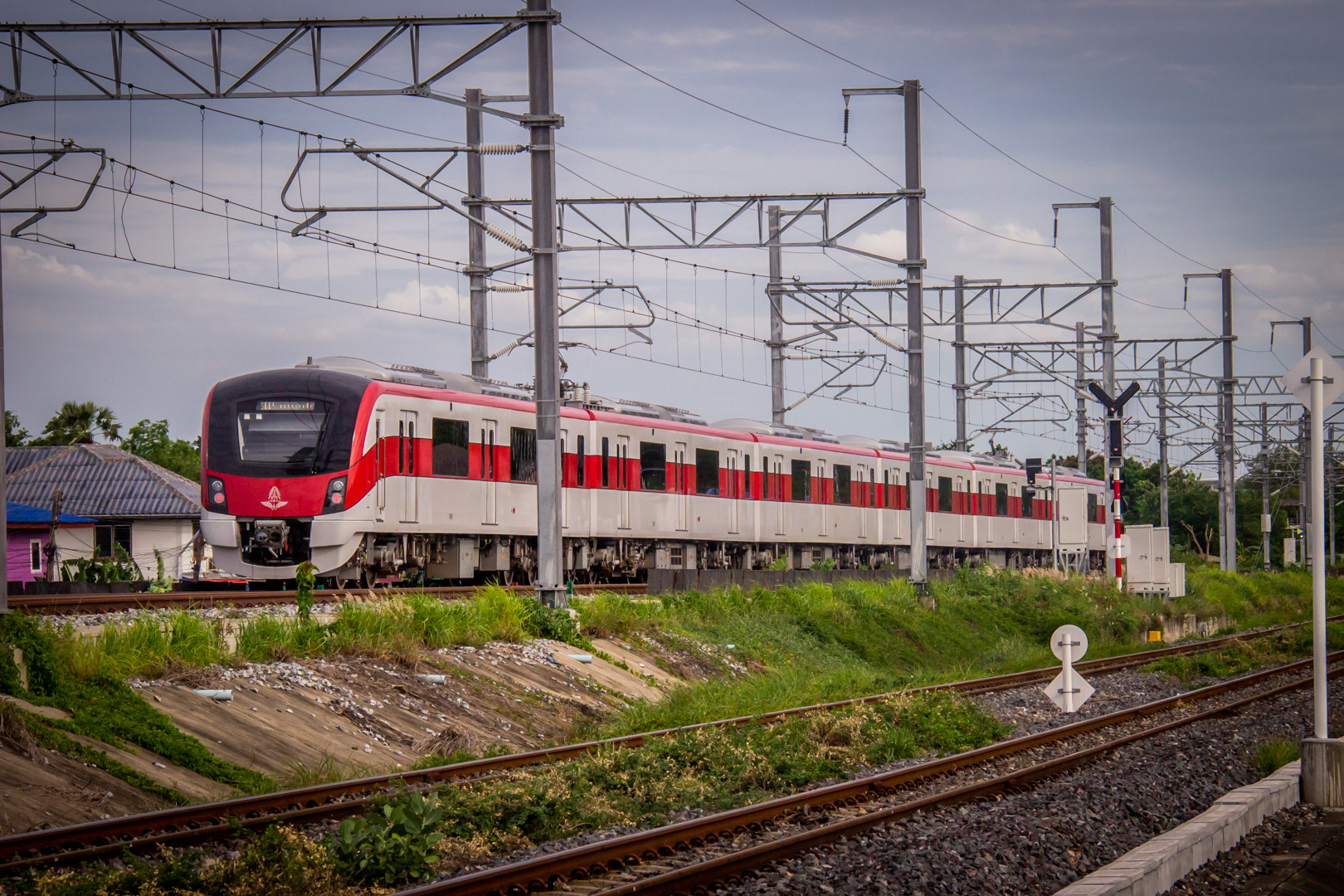
- SRT Dark Red Line train at the Rangsit railway station

Overview
- Other name: Thani Ratthaya Line
- Native name: สายธานีรัถยา
- Status: Operational (Phase 1)
- Owner: State Railway of Thailand
- Locale: Bangkok Metropolitan Region
- Termini: Krung Thep Aphiwat; Rangsit
- Stations: 10

Service
- Type: Commuter rail
- System: SRT Red Lines
- Operator: SRTET - SRT Electrified Train Company Limited
- Depot(s): Chatuchak, Bangkok
- Rolling stock: Hitachi AT100

History
- Opened: 2 August 2021 (free trial service); 29 November 2021 (commercial service)

Technical
- Line length: 26 km (16 mi)
- Num of tracks: 2
- Character: Elevated
- Track gauge: 1,000 mm (3 ft 3 3/8 in) metre gauge
- Electrification: 25 kV 50 Hz AC overhead catenary
- Operating speed: 160 km/h (99 mph)
- Signalling: Thales AlTrac for ERTMS (ETCS Level 1)

The SRT Dark Red Line (also referred to as Thani Ratthaya Line (Thai: รถไฟชานเมือง สายธานีรัถยา)) is part of the SRT Red Line suburban railway system to serve the greater Bangkok Metropolitan Region running for 26 km (16 mi) between Krung Thep Aphiwat Central Terminal and Rangsit.

Phase I of the line opened for trial operations on 2 August 2021, with full commercial services beginning on 29 November 2021.

Tenders for the much delayed 8.84 km (5.49 mi) Phase II extension of the line from Rangsit to Thammasat University were opened in December 2025. Submissions to the SRT were due by 29 December 2025, with bid winners announced in January 2026 and contracts signed in May 2026. Construction is expected to start in July 2026 and take 36 months with a target to start operation in 2029.

== Route alignment ==
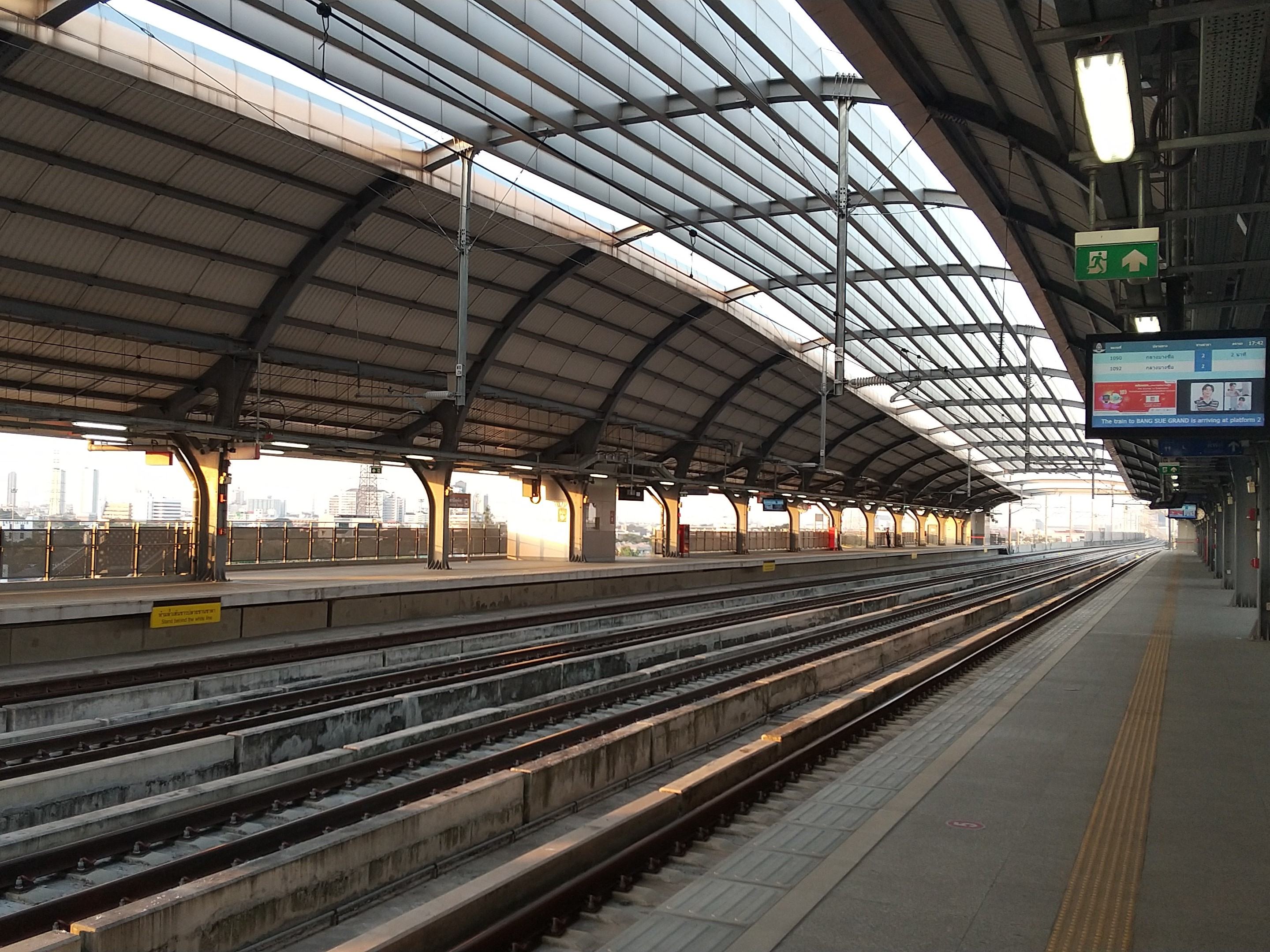
Elevated platforms of Chatuchak Station on the dark red line

Section I of the SRT Dark Red Line starts at the new Krung Thep Aphiwat Central Terminal heading north for 26 km (16.16 mi) via Don Mueang and terminates at Rangsit in Pathum Thani Province. Section II line will then be extended 8.84 km (5.49 mi) north from Rangsit to the Thammasat University Rangsit campus.

From Krung Thep Aphiwat Central Terminal the line will be extended 11 km (6.84 mi) south via Phaya Thai to Hua Lamphong station in Section III. Section IV section of the line will run southeast from Hua Lamphong via Wongwian Yai for 39 km (24.23 mi) to Maha Chai in Samut Sakhon Province along the current Maha Chai railway alignment.

When fully completed, the line will run on a north–south axis through Bangkok, from Thammasat University's Rangsit campus in Pathum Thani Province to Maha Chai in Samut Sakhon Province for a full length of nearly 87 km (54.06 mi).

== History ==
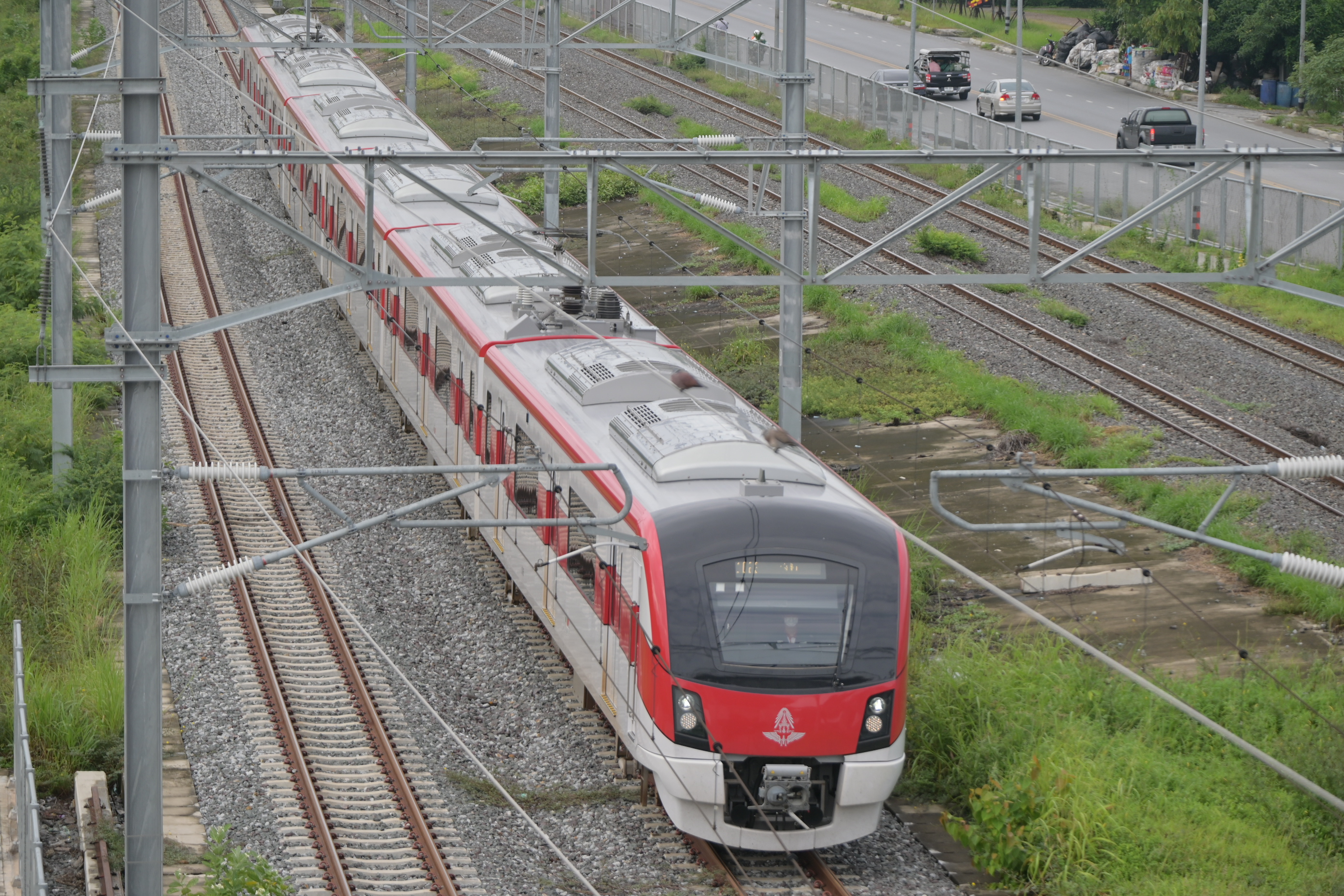
A Hitachi-built SRT 1000 series approaching Lak Hok (Rangsit University) station on the dark red line

In 2004, in conjunction with OTP, the SRT began formulating plans for a new, modern suburban network in Bangkok along existing SRT alignments to replace the existing, limited services. On 7 November 2006, the Thai Cabinet passed a resolution to approve the framework of the new network with the SRT Light Red line being DMU operations while the SRT Dark Red Line would be EMU. At the time, it was expected that the full line could be completed within 15–20 years. In February 2009, the Thai government secured a 24 billion baht (US$685 million) loan from the Japanese Government for the initial segment of the 87 km (54 mi) line. The first Phase from Bang Sue to Rangsit was approved in 2010 but delayed due to a complicated 2.5 year contractual dispute.

The budget for the 1st Phase of the Dark Red Line project progressively increased due to numerous delays and further redesigns of the project. From an initial estimated 59.89 billion baht in 2007, to 75.55 billion baht in 2009 and to 80.38 billion baht in 2012. An additional requested 8.14 billion baht to increase the number of tracks increased the final budget to 88.52 billion baht.

=== Construction: Bang Sue to Rangsit ===
The 26 km (16 mi), 10 station Bang Sue to Rangsit section finally started construction in May 2013 with a scheduled construction period of just over 3 years to be completed by the end of 2016. Construction works were delayed by 2 months due to site access issues for the contractor and delays related to removing slum dwellers residing within the right of way. However, it was hoped that the use of some of the old Hopewell pillars would speed up the initial construction timetable. By the end of 2013, the project was only 3% done & already months behind schedule due to a longer timetable in removing the Hopewell Pillars.

In June 2014, the SRT requested an additional 8.14 billion baht to modify the Dark Red line to 4 tracks instead of 3.Aaccordingly, redesign all stations and to provide for the longer platforms for the Bang Sue Terminal to cater for future HSR lines. 8.140 billion baht request is; 4.32 billion baht for Contract 1 (modifications to Bang Sue Grand Station to cater for High Speed trains); 3.35 billion Baht for Contract 2 (4th track and stations redesign) and 473 million baht for Contract 3.

In September 2017, civil works progress was stated to be 88.63%. By the end of September 2019 civil works were almost fully complete at 99.56% and Electrical and Signalling installation was at 45.60%. By July 2020, S&E installation was at 85.12% completion. By October 2020, 90% of the power supply for the line had been installed by the Metropolitan Electricity Authority (MEA) with all installation due for completion by November 2020.

In mid-November 2020, the Minister of Transport announced that free trial operations would operate from March 2021 with full-service operations expected from November 2021. In late February 2021, the SRT confirmed that free trial operations will commence on 26 March 2021 with full commercial operations starting on 28 July 2021. However, in July 2021 the SRT again postponed the free trial operations until 2 August 2021.

=== Krung Thep Aphiwat Central Terminal (Bangkok's new Intercity terminal station) ===
Contract 1 of the project was for the construction of a new, 4 level Intercity Terminal to cater for all SRT Intercity Trains, SRT Red Line suburban trains and the yet to be built Airport Rail Link (Bangkok) extension. The delayed contract process was finally signed in January 2013. In August 2013, the SRT sought extra funds for the project to be redesigned in order to extend upper level platforms to a 400–600 m length in order to accommodate the future planned High Speed lines. (Funding was finally requested in June 2014 - see above section)

In March 2013, the new Bang Sue Grand Station started construction. Between March and June, excavation works for the foundation of the Terminal were delayed by the unearthing of numerous World War II unexploded bombs which required safe removal by the Thai army Explosive Ordnance Teams. In July 2014, construction was 10% behind schedule.

The new station was originally scheduled to open by end of 2016 but the above-mentioned redesign work and other delays resulted in an expected 2020 opening date. In September 2017, construction progress of the station civil works was at 57.50%. By the end of September 2019 civil works were at 86.01%. By July 2020, civil works were almost complete at 99.8%.

Construction on the station was completed in August 2021.

== Rolling stock ==
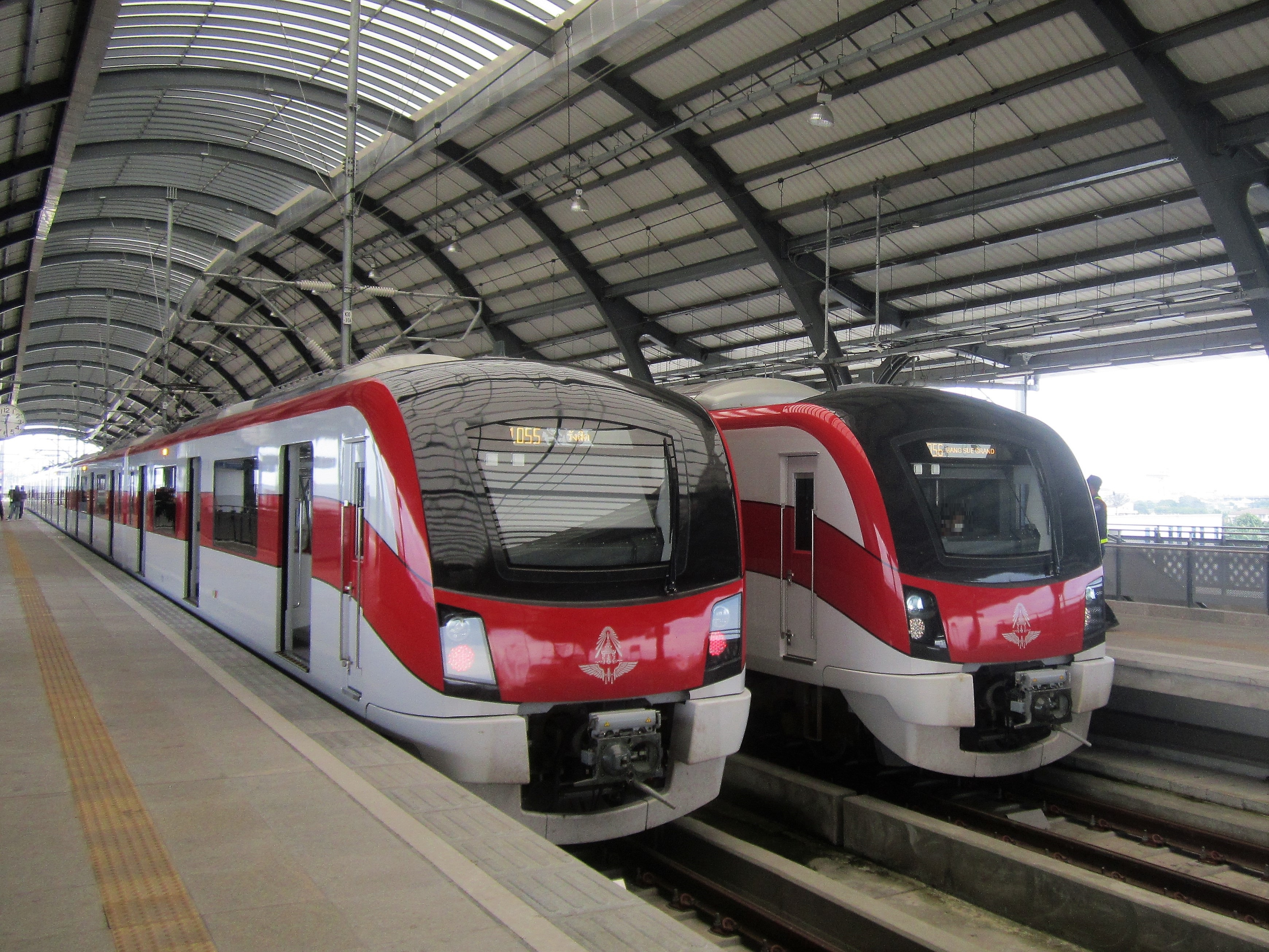
SRT Dark Red Line trains at Rangsit station

The 3rd contract for the Dark Red Line was for electrical and systems (E&S) and procuring EMU rolling stock. An overhead catenary electrical system with 25 kV 50 Hz AC was specified. In April 2014, only 2 bidders remained but one of the bidding consortiums was disqualified on due to the fact that one of the consortium members (Maru Beni Corp) had convictions for bribery in an Indonesian bidding process.

This left MHSC Consortium (Mitsubishi and Hitachi and Sumitomo) as the sole bidder qualified for the contract. However, their bid of 28,899 million Baht was above the SRT median price of 26 billion baht which was set in 2010. The MHSC Consortium argued that their bid reflects 2013 prices after the minimum wage increase of January 2012. Finally in July 2014, after a prolonged 2-year delay in the bidding process, JICA approved the loan for Contract 3. However, the coup of May 2014 delayed finalization leading to further review and negotiations. By mid 2016, negotiations had concluded and Hitachi promised that all rolling stock for the Dark Red line would be delivered by 2020. The contract specifies 25 EMUs consisting of ten 4 car sets and fifteen 6 car sets for 130 cars in total.

In late September 2019, the first 2 sets of rolling stock were shipped from Japan and both arrived in Thailand at Laem Chabang port on 12 October 2019 for shipment to Bangkok. By March 2020, 5 sets had been delivered.

As of July 2020, 13 sets - 7 of the 6 car sets and 6 of the 4 car sets - of the total 25 sets of rolling stock had been delivered with a further 2 sets due to be delivered by August 2020. By the end of September 2020, 21 sets had been delivered - 13 of the 6 car sets and 8 of the 4 car sets - with the final 4 sets to be delivered in October.

== Operation ==
Services operate between 5:30am to 12am. Headways are every 20 minutes except for the peak periods (7am to 9am and 5pm to 7pm) where services depart every 12 minutes.

The line had a flat fare of 20 Baht until 30 September 2025, when it was replaced by fares ranging from 12-42 baht, with discounts for students and seniors.

=== Ridership ===
On the first full day of free trial operations on 3 August 2021 total passengers numbered 2,914, on 4 August 2,856 passengers used the line. By the end of September, this had increased to around 4,500-5,000 passengers a day. For the first 10 months of operations to September 2022 both Red lines carried over 3.2 million passengers and services ran on time 99.45% of the time according to the SRT. By the end of September 2022, the line averaged only 309,000 passengers a month. By January 2023, the average number daily passengers rose to around 22,000 to 23,000 on weekdays. At the end of April 2023, daily weekday passengers were 4,000 for Don Mueang station and 2,500 for Rangsit station.

SRT Dark Red Line Ridership
Year	Quarter	Quarterly Ridership	Daily Ridership	Annual Ridership	Remarks
2022	Q1	750,070	8,334	4,419,197	
2022	Q2	935,332	10,278	4,419,197	
2022	Q3	1,306,002	14,196	4,419,197	
2022	Q4	1,427,793	15,519	4,419,197	
2023	Q1	1,557,481	17,305	6,636,376	
2023	Q2	1,455,483	15,994	6,636,376	
2023	Q3	1,665,625	18,105	6,636,376	
2023	Q4	1,957,787	21,280	6,636,376	
2024	Q1	2,155,598	24,004	9,238,671	
2024	Q2	2,093,599	23,016	9,238,671	
2024	Q3	2,410,818	26,501	9,238,671	
2024	Q4	2,534,129	27,555	9,238,671	
2025	Q1	2,668,554	29,670	10,397,173	
2025	Q2	2,410,818	26,501	10,397,173	
2025	Q3	2,680,293	29,132	10,397,173	
2025	Q4	2,637,508	28,693	10,397,173	The 20 baht flat fare on the Red and Purple lines ended on 30 September 2025
2026	Q1	2,281,421	25,349	7,161,067 (Note: As of October 2026)	
2026	Q2	2,005,414	22,038	7,161,067	
2026	Q3	2,143,394	23,298	7,161,067	
2026	Q4	730,838	23,575	7,161,067	

Note: Passenger statistics for the Dark Red Line exclude users of the GATE EMV KTB card. The State Railway of Thailand does not publish separate figures for passengers using GATE EMV KTB cards the Dark Red and Light Red lines. As of Q1 2026, there is a daily average of 9,753 users on both lines.

== Future extensions ==
In July 2016, the Thai Cabinet approved the first section of the southern extension from Bang Sue to Hua Lamphong. However, the 10 km (6.2 mi) 4 station northern extension from Rangsit to Thammasat University (Phase II) will be built first.

Construction segments based on M-Map:

Phase	Segment	Length	Progress
I	Rangsit–Bang Sue	26 km (16.16 mi)	Full operation: 29 November 2021
II	Thammasat University–Rangsit	8.84 km (5.49 mi)	construction start 15 july 2026
III	Bang Sue–Hua Lamphong	11 km (6.84 mi)	Planned
IV	Hua Lamphong–Bang Bon	18 km (11.18 mi)	Planned
V	Bang Bon–Maha Chai	20 km (12.43 mi)	Planned
VI	Maha Chai–Maeklong	24 km (14.91 mi)	Suggested - unlikely to be built
VII	Maeklong–Pak Tho	22 km (13.67 mi)	Suggested - unlikely to be built

=== Phase II Rangsit–Thammasat University ===
The 8.84 km (5.49 mi), 4 station extension was approved by Cabinet in 2016 with an expected tender by September 2018. The extension to Thammasat University was then to be tendered in the 2nd half of 2019. However, the tender was further been delayed until 2021 as the transport minister requested that the new Department of Railways investigate conducting PPP tenders for the extension.

However, the tender has yet again been further delayed until 2021 as the Transport Minister has requested that the new Department of Railways investigate conducting PPP tenders for this extension. The decision to change the extensions to PPP projects and tender out the operation of the line with a 50 year concession was opposed by the SRT and SRT union. On 10 February 2021, the Department of Railways announced that in April 2021 the SRT would issue the tenders for the north extension to Thammasat University and the south extension to Hua Lamphong station. However, the PPP tender process was subject to further review.

In October 2021, the SRT announced that the PPP tenders would not be released until June 2022 with the aim to sign contracts for the extensions (with 50 year leases) in July 2023. However, this was delayed yet again to an initial October 2022 tender release and later a December 2022 date. In late October 2022, the SRT again delayed the tender time frame to February 2023 with an aim to sign contracts by May 2023 but the time frame was contingent on new Cabinet approval of an updated budget for the extension. At the same time, the SRT decided to defer the bidding for the 50 year operation concession and new EMUs to December 2024. Once the concession is contracted the SRTET will cease to operate the line.

With the 14 May 2023 national elections and the expected time frame in the formation of a new government, it became unlikely that the tenders would be issued until late 2023. In late June, a MOT source expressed that the extension is likely be taken to Cabinet in October 2023 for approval of a new budget of 6.5 billion baht to build the extension. If approved, a tender was expected to be issued in the first quarter of 2024.

Tenders for Phase II were finally opened in December 2025, with submission due by 29 December 2025 and bidding completed by February 2026. In March 2026, the Ministry of Transport officially announced the results for the extension. Unique Engineering and Construction PCL was awarded the contract with a winning bid of 6.057 billion baht - the construction of this 8.84-kilometer extension is scheduled to take 3 years.

=== Phase III Bang Sue–Hua Lamphong ===
The 11.0 km (6.84 mi), 7-station southern extension to Hua Lumphong station was approved by Cabinet in 2016. However, the northern extension to Thammasat University will be built before this section. The route feasibility and alignment is still under study.

In February 2026, the SRT proposed shifting the current plan for Ratchawithi Station approximately 100m from the northern side of Uphaichetsaduthit intersection to the southern side, in order to function as a key transport hub facilitating Ramathibodi Hospital, the Mahidol University Faculty of Science and the Thai Ministry of Foreign Affairs headquarters. The proposed station will be renamed to Ramathibodi Station.

The Phase III extension forms part of the so-called "Missing Link" section of the SRT Red Lines network. The project overlaps with the Bang Sue–Hua Mak section of the Light Red Line, as well as the Three Airport Railway.

The much-delayed Missing Link section gained renewed attention after the 2026 Bangkok train collision at a level crossing at Makkasan Station in central Bangkok. This along with 27 other level crossings in the city were intended to be eliminated by the Missing Link section of the Light Red Line.

The State Railway of Thailand brought forward proposals to complete feasibility studies on the line to submit to Cabinet in 2028, open construction bids in 2029 with an aim to complete the project in 2034.

=== Phase IV & V Hua Lamphong–Bang Bon–Maha Chai ===
The last section of the line will run 39.0 km (24.23 mi) southeast from Hua Lumphong to Maha Chai in Samut Sakhon Province via Wong Wian Yai along the current Maha Chai railway alignment.

=== Potential extension Maha Chai–Ratchaburi ===
The Office of Transport and Traffic Policy and Planning (OTP) have studied the improvement and construction of the Mae Klong railway line which will be constructed through Samut Sakhon, Samut Songkhram and Ratchaburi provinces. It will use a bypass route in Samut Sakhon Province by deviating from the original train line for about 31 km (19 mi). Between Ban Khom railway station and Khlong Chak railway station, the line will be elevated across Ekachai road and deviate along the route of Rama II Road around the km 26 + 800 to the 32 + 160 km, then divert to the left to go straight to connect with the original train line.

From Samut Songkhram the suggested route will be constructed across the Mae Klong River. A third option is expected to be in use, which is to bypass Samut Songkhram city by diverging from the original train line about 66 km after passing Bang Kraboon railway station, which will be an elevated railway along the National Highway No. 325 to cross the Mae Klong Canal and Highway 325 at the intersection to Damnoen Saduak District, approximately 40 + 850 km and crossing the Mae Klong River. It will then revert to ground level and end at Pak Tho railway station, Ratchaburi which will build a train parallel with the royal highway number 3093 and will have 3 more new railway stations in this section. Expected total value of this project is approximately 42,243 million baht.

When completed, it will be a new southern railway line, which will help shorten the original train route, which originally runs through Nakhon Pathom and Ratchaburi before going to Pak Tho Station. The new Southern Railway will reduce the distance by about 43 kilometers and the aim of the project also includes the development of the Southwest Transport Center. However, as of 2016 this planned southern extension is very unlikely to be built as when Cabinet approved the northern extension to Thammasat University and the Southern extension to Hua Lumphong, only the original project scope to Maha Chai was referenced.

== List of stations ==
Currently, services operate as all stops. Express trains will likely enter operation after additional phases are completed.

Code	Station Name	Thai	Express Train (planned)	City Train	Transfer	Location
Phase II - Northern extension
RN14	Thammasat University	มหาวิทยาลัยธรรมศาสตร์ ศูนย์รังสิต	●	●		Pathum Thani
RN13	Chiang Rak	เชียงราก		●		Pathum Thani
RN12	Bangkok University	มหาวิทยาลัยกรุงเทพ		●		Pathum Thani
RN11	Khlong Nueng	คลองหนึ่ง		●		Pathum Thani
Phase I
RN10	Rangsit	รังสิต	●	●		Pathum Thani
RN09	Lak Hok (Rangsit University)	หลักหก (มหาวิทยาลัยรังสิต)		●		Pathum Thani
RN08	Don Mueang	ดอนเมือง	●	●	Don Mueang International Airport ARL (preliminary works)	Bangkok
RN07	Kan Kheha	การเคหะ		●		Bangkok
RN06	Lak Si	หลักสี่		●	MRT	Bangkok
RN05	Thung Song Hong	ทุ่งสองห้อง		●		Bangkok
RN04	Bang Khen	บางเขน		●	MRT : Bang Khen (design phase)	Bangkok
RN03	Wat Samian Nari	วัดเสมียนนารี		●		Bangkok
RN02	Chatuchak	จตุจักร		●		Bangkok
RN01	Bang Sue (Krung Thep Aphiwat)	กรุงเทพอภิวัฒน์	●	●	SRT; MRT : Bang Sue ARL (preliminary works)	Bangkok
RS01	Bang Sue (Krung Thep Aphiwat)	กรุงเทพอภิวัฒน์	●	●	SRT; MRT : Bang Sue ARL (preliminary works)	Bangkok
Phase III - Southern extension
RS02	Pradiphat	ประดิพัทธ์		●	SRT	Bangkok
RS03	Sam Sen	สามเสน		●	SRT	Bangkok
RS04	Ratchawithi	ราชวิถี		●	SRT	Bangkok
RS05	Yommarat	ยมราช		●	MRT : Yommarat (tender awarded)	Bangkok
RS06	Yot Se	ยศเส		●	BTS : Yot Se (proposed extension)	Bangkok
RS07	Hua Lamphong	หัวลำโพง	●	●	MRT : Hua Lamphong	Bangkok
Phase IV
RS08	Khlong San	คลองสาน		●	BTS	Bangkok
RS09	Wongwian Yai	วงเวียนใหญ่		●	BTS : Wongwian Yai MRT : Wongwian Yai (under construction)	Bangkok
RS10	Talat Phlu	ตลาดพลู		●	BTS : Talat Phlu	Bangkok
RS11	Taksin	ตากสิน	●	●	BTS : Wutthakat	Bangkok
RS12	Chom Thong	จอมทอง		●		Bangkok
RS13	Wat Sai	วัดไทร		●		Bangkok
RS14	Wat Sing	วัดสิงห์	●	●		Bangkok
RS15	Bang Bon	บางบอน		●		Bangkok
Phase V
RS16	Rang Sakae	รางสะแก		●		Bangkok
RS17	Rang Pho	รางโพธิ์	●	●		Bangkok
RS18	Sam Yaek	สามแยก		●		Bangkok
RS19	Phrom Daen	พรมแดน		●		Bangkok
RS20	Thung Si Thong	ทุ่งสีทอง	●	●		Samut Sakhon
RS21	Bang Nam Chuet	บางน้ำจืด		●		Samut Sakhon
RS22	Khok Khwai	คอกควาย		●		Samut Sakhon
RS23	Ekkachai	เอกชัย	●	●		Samut Sakhon
RS24	Maha Chai	มหาชัย	●	●		Samut Sakhon
Phase VI (Unlikely to be built)
x	Tha Chalom	ท่าฉลอม				Samut Sakhon
x	Nok Lek	นกเล็ก				Samut Sakhon
x	Si Kot	สีคต				Samut Sakhon
x	Bang Krachao	บางกระเจ้า				Samut Sakhon
x	Ban Bo	บ้านบ่อ				Samut Sakhon
x	Bang Thorat	บางโทรัด				Samut Sakhon
x	Ban Ka Long	บ้านกาหลง				Samut Sakhon
x	Ban Na Khwang	บ้านนาขวาง				Samut Sakhon
x	Ban Na Khok	บ้านนาโคก				Samut Sakhon
x	Ban Ket Muang	บ้านเขตเมือง				Samut Songkhram
x	Lad Yai	ลาดใหญ่				Samut Songkhram
x	Bang Krabun	บางกระบูน				Samut Songkhram
x	Mae Klong	แม่กลอง				Samut Songkhram
Phase VII (Unlikely to be built)
x	Bang Khan Thong	บางขันทอง				Samut Songkhram
x	Plai Phong Phang	ปลายโพงพาง				Samut Songkhram
x	Wat Pleng	วัดเพลง				Ratchaburi
x	Pak Tho	ปากท่อ			SRT Southern line	Ratchaburi

== Network map ==
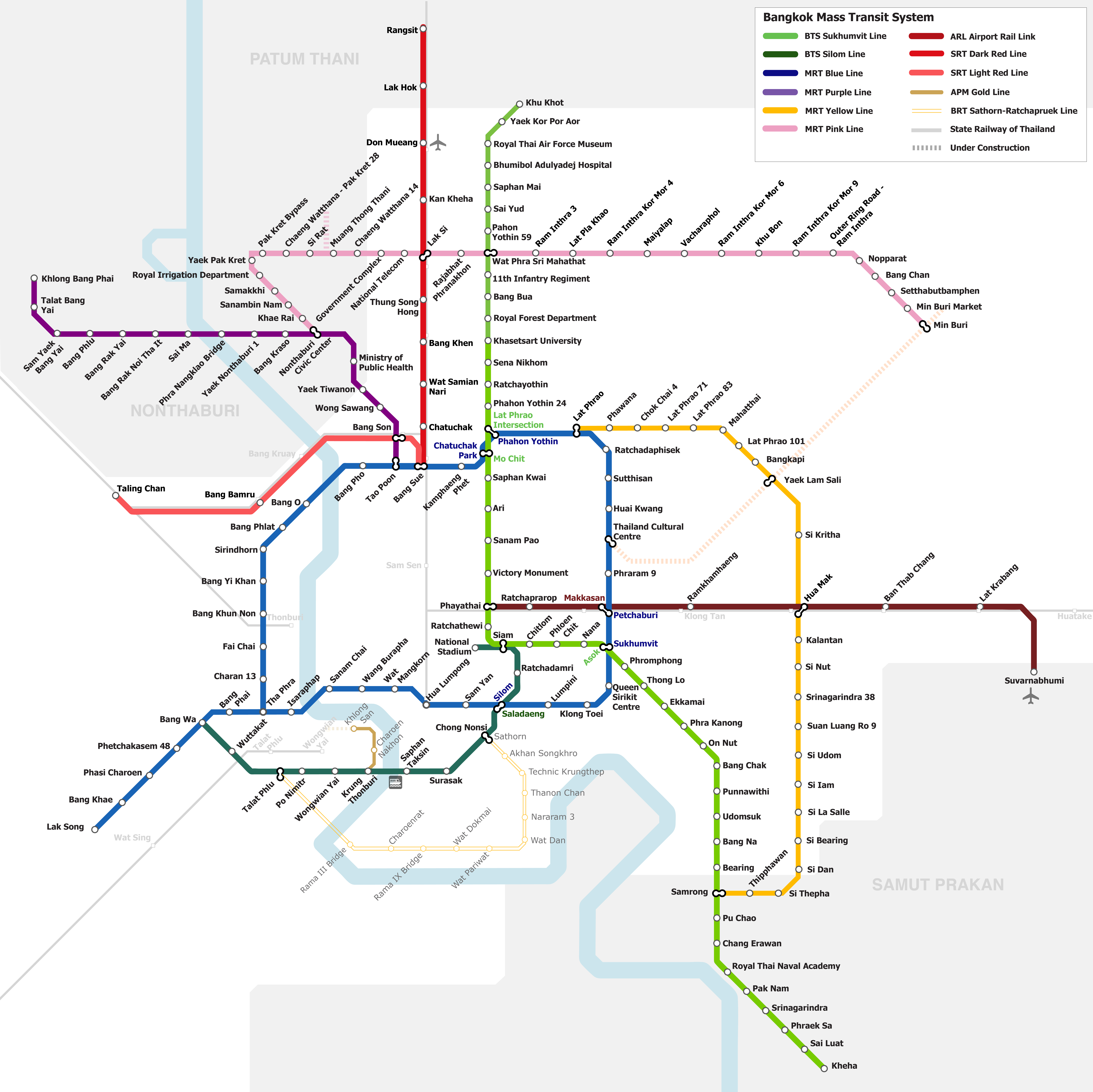

== See also ==
- Mass Rapid Transit Master Plan in Bangkok Metropolitan Region
- SRT Light Red Line
- Airport Rail Link (Bangkok)
- BTS Skytrain
- Sukhumvit Line
- Silom Line
- MRT (Bangkok)
- MRT Blue Line
- MRT Brown Line
- MRT Grey Line
- MRT Light Blue Line
- MRT Orange Line
- MRT Pink Line
- MRT Purple Line
- MRT Yellow Line
- Bangkok BRT
- BMA Gold Line
