= Chong Khae railway station =

Railway station in Thailand

Coordinates: 15.1649°N 100.4208°E

Chong Khae ช่องแค

General information
- Location: Chaloem Phrakiat Road, Mu 1 (Ban Chong Khae), Chong Khae Subdistrict, Takhli District, Nakhon Sawan
- Owner: State Railway of Thailand
- Line: Northern Line
- Platforms: 1
- Tracks: 5

Other information
- Station code: ชค.

History
- Opened: 31 October 1905

Services
Preceding station	State Railway of Thailand	Following station
Ban Kok Kwaow Halt towards Hua Lamphong or Krung Thep Aphiwat	Northern Line	Thale Wa Halt towards Chiang Mai
Location

Chong Khae railway station is a railway station located in Chong Khae Subdistrict, Takhli District, Nakhon Sawan. It is located 180.315 km from Bangkok railway station and is a class 2 railway station. It is on the Northern Line of the State Railway of Thailand. The station opened on 31 October 1905 as part of the Northern Line extension from Lop Buri to Pak Nam Pho.

== Sources ==
- Ichirō, Kakizaki (2010). Ōkoku no tetsuro: tai tetsudō no rekishi. Kyōto: Kyōtodaigakugakujutsushuppankai. ISBN 978-4-87698-848-8
- Otohiro, Watanabe (2013). Tai kokutetsu yonsenkiro no tabi: shasō fūkei kanzen kiroku. Tōkyō: Bungeisha. ISBN 978-4-286-13041-5
