= Rangsit railway station =

Railway station in Thailand

Rangsit รังสิต
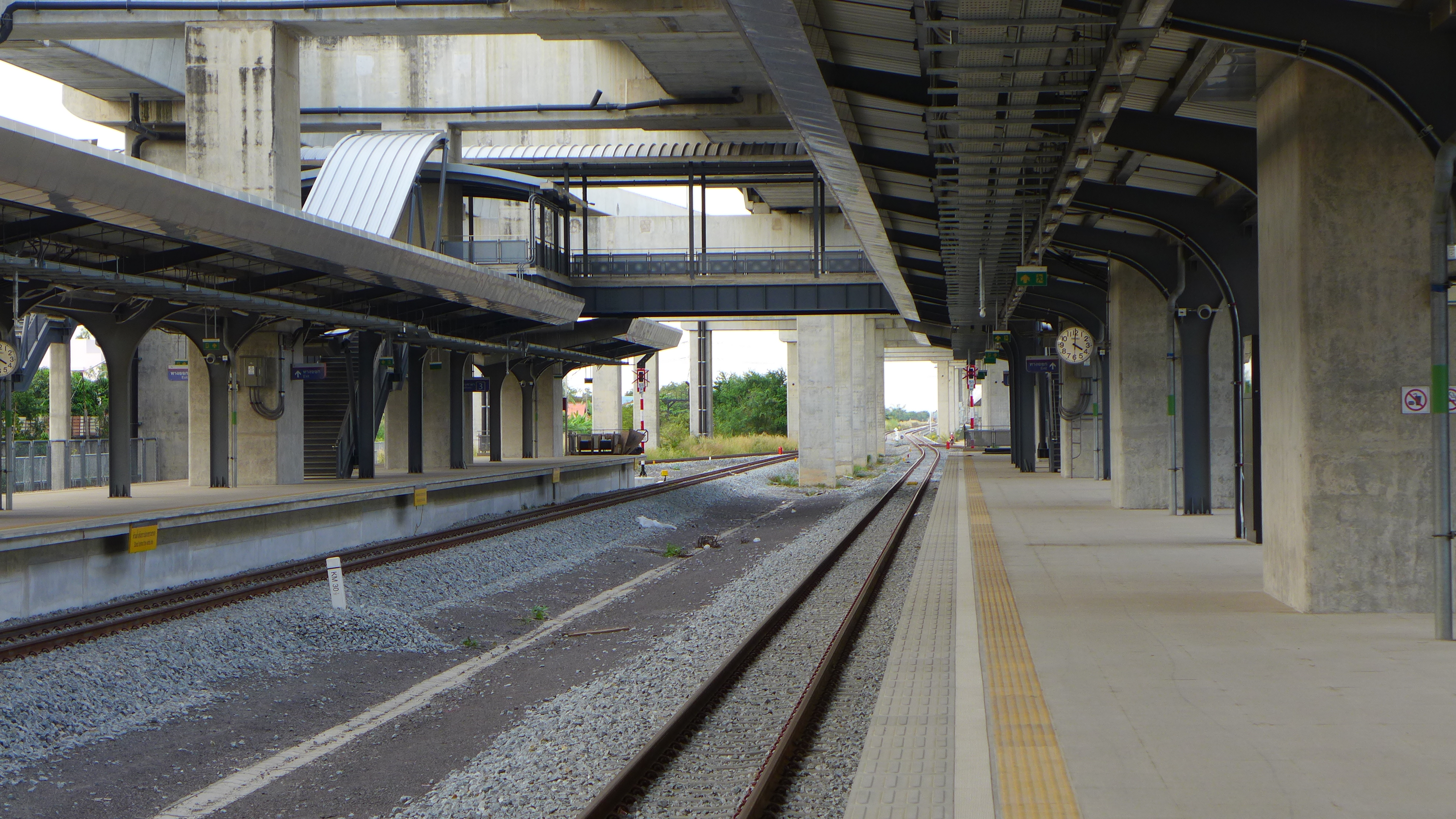
- Modernization of the ground-level platforms for long-distance trains

General information
- Location: Rangsit, Thanyaburi District; Pathum Thani Province; Thailand
- Coordinates: 13.9905°N 100.6022°E
- Operator: State Railway of Thailand
- Manager: Ministry of Transport
- Platforms: 8
- Tracks: 8

Construction
- Structure type: Elevated (SRT Red Lines); Ground (SRT Intercity)

Other information
- Station code: รต., RN10

History
- Opened: 26 March 1896; 130 years ago (original); 2 August 2021; 5 years ago (elevated)
- Rebuilt: 17 December 2020; 5 years ago

Services
Preceding station	State Railway of Thailand	Following station
Don Mueang towards Hua Lamphong or Krung Thep Aphiwat	Northern Line	Khlong Nueng Halt towards Chiang Mai
Don Mueang towards Hua Lamphong or Krung Thep Aphiwat	Northeastern Line	Khlong Nueng Halt towards Ubon Ratchathani or Khamsavath (Laos)
Preceding station	SRT Red Lines	Following station
Lak Hok (Rangsit University) towards Krung Thep Aphiwat	Dark Red Line	Terminus
Location

Rangsit is the current northern terminus of the SRT Dark Red Line in Rangsit, Pathum Thani Province, Thailand. It also serves intercity State Railway of Thailand trains on the Northern Line and Northeastern Line.

Rangsit Station is located next to Rattanakos in 200 Years Village, near Future Park Rangsit. From Rangsit Station to Future Park Rangsit is around 2–3 km (1.2–1.9 mi).

== History ==
Rangsit station opened as a stop on the first railway in Thailand between Bangkok to Ayutthaya in 1896. Its initial location was at the former Khlong Rangsit Halt, located around 1.7 km south of the current location and was a railway station at the time. It was in use until the general public requested the construction of a station closer to the main road. On 10 July 1994 a newer railway station was built at the current location and Khlong Rangsit was then reduced to halt and remained serving only commuter trains. Khlong Rangsit Halt officially closed on 15 September 2020 in preparation for SRT Dark Red Line trial runs. This new Rangsit station structure remained in use until the construction of the SRT Dark Red Line in 2013. A temporary station was constructed and remained in use until 2020 when the current structure opened.

== Station layout ==
U3; Upper platform (Suburban Train)	Platform 1	Dark Red Line toward Bang Sue
U3; Upper platform (Suburban Train)	Island platform, doors open on the left/right.
U3; Upper platform (Suburban Train)	Platform 2	Dark Red Line toward Bang Sue
U3; Upper platform (Suburban Train)	Platform 3	Dark Red Line terminus
U3; Upper platform (Suburban Train)	Island platform, doors open on the left/right.
U3; Upper platform (Suburban Train)	Platform 4	Dark Red Line terminus
U2 ticket sales class	ticket sales floor	Exit 1-4, Passenger Service Center, Ticket Office, Ticket Machine, Shop
G Lower platform (long-distance vehicle) road level	-	Bus Stop, Passenger Pick Up Point, Chang Erawan Road 1
G Lower platform (long-distance vehicle) road level	Platform 5	Northern Line toward Bang Sue and Hua Lamphong
G Lower platform (long-distance vehicle) road level	Island platform, doors open on the left/right.
G Lower platform (long-distance vehicle) road level	Platform 6	Northeastern Line toward Bang Sue and Hua Lamphong
G Lower platform (long-distance vehicle) road level	Platform 7	Northern Line toward Chiang Mai
G Lower platform (long-distance vehicle) road level	Island platform, doors open on the left/right.
G Lower platform (long-distance vehicle) road level	Platform 8	Northeastern Line toward Ubon Ratchathani or Nong Khai
G Lower platform (long-distance vehicle) road level	-	Bus Stop, Rangsit-Pathum Thani Road, PTT Rangsit Gas Pressure and Control Station

== Gallery ==
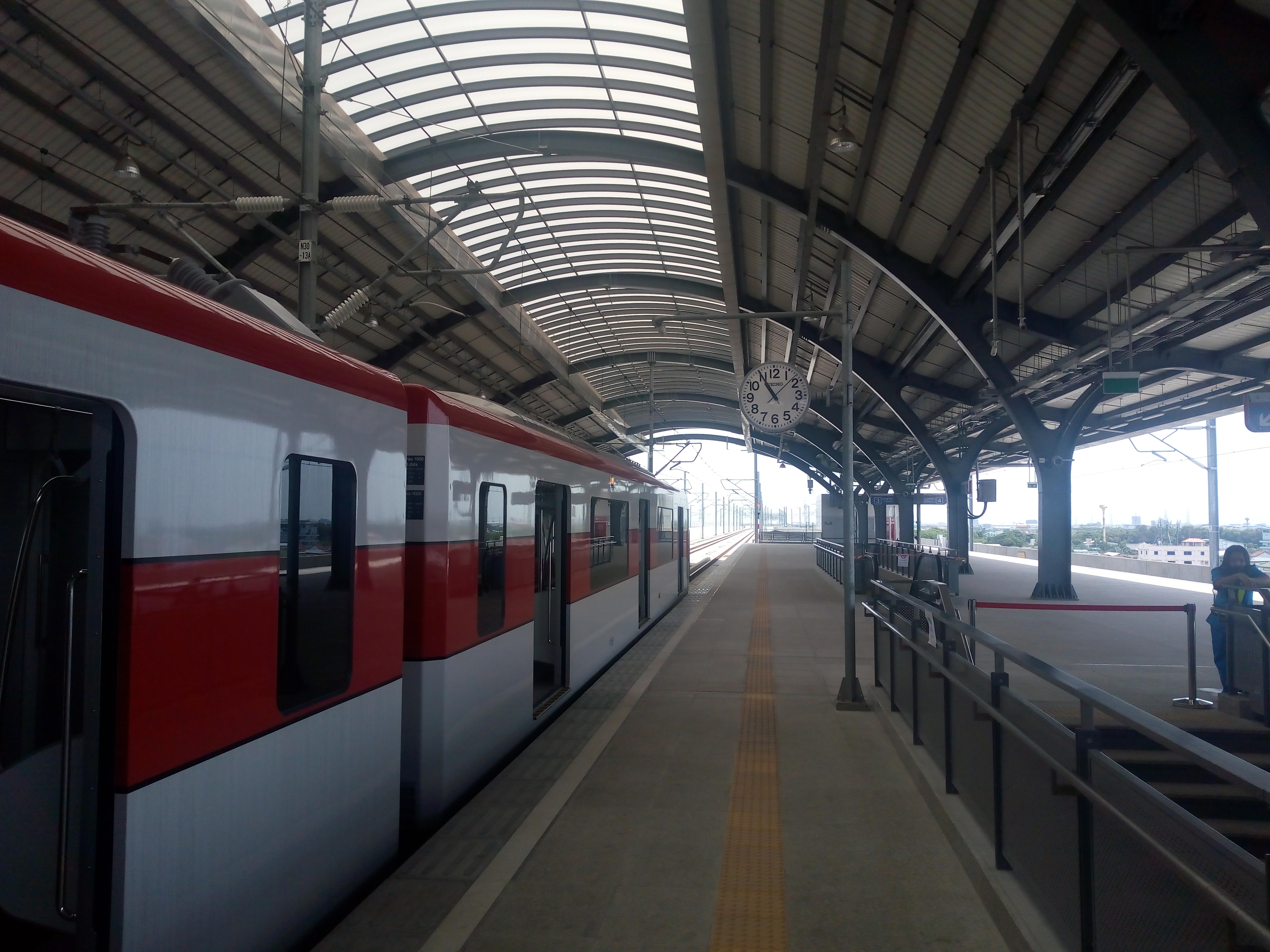
Dark Red Line train at upper-level platforms

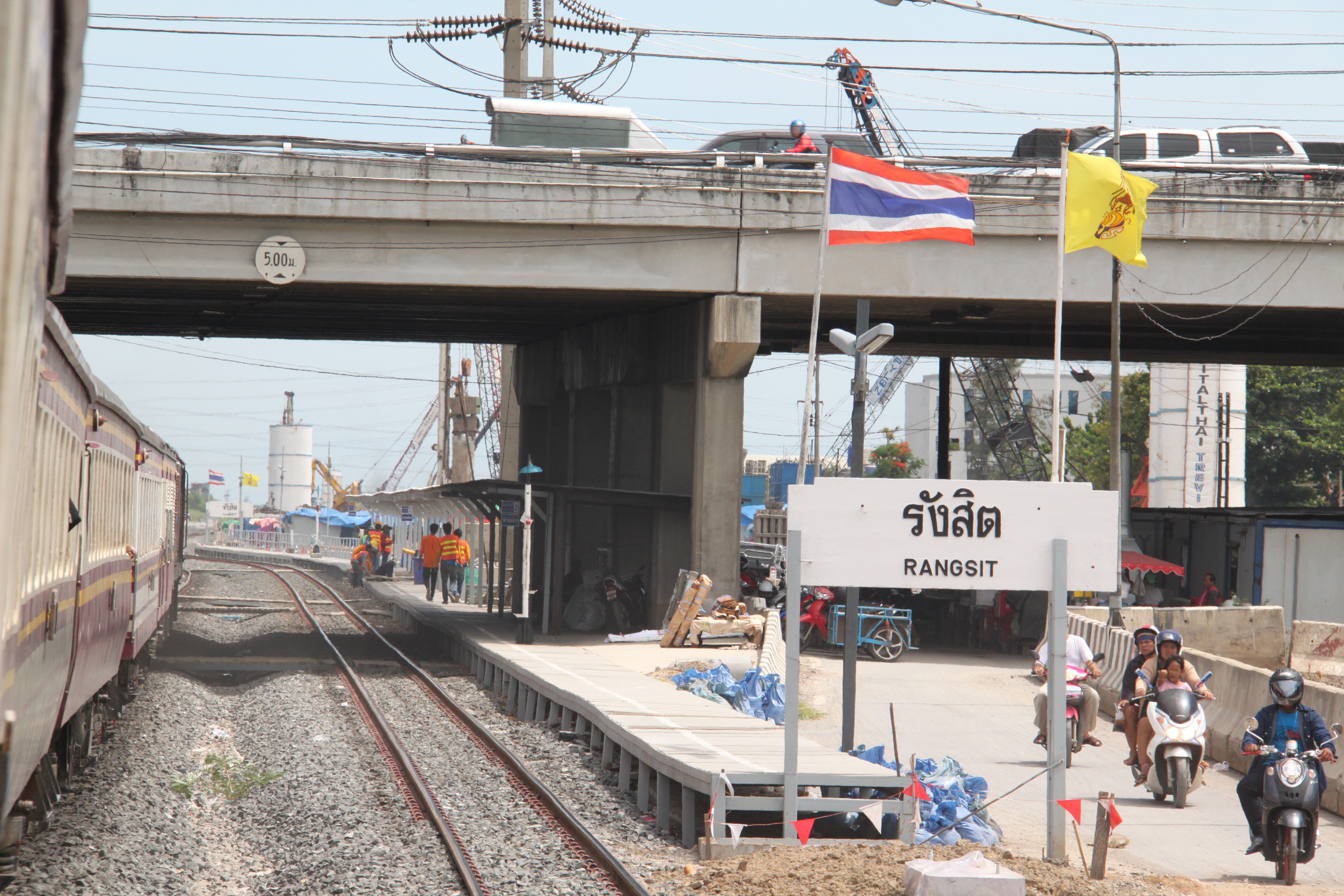
Temporary station structure used during the construction of the new station, used between 2013-2020

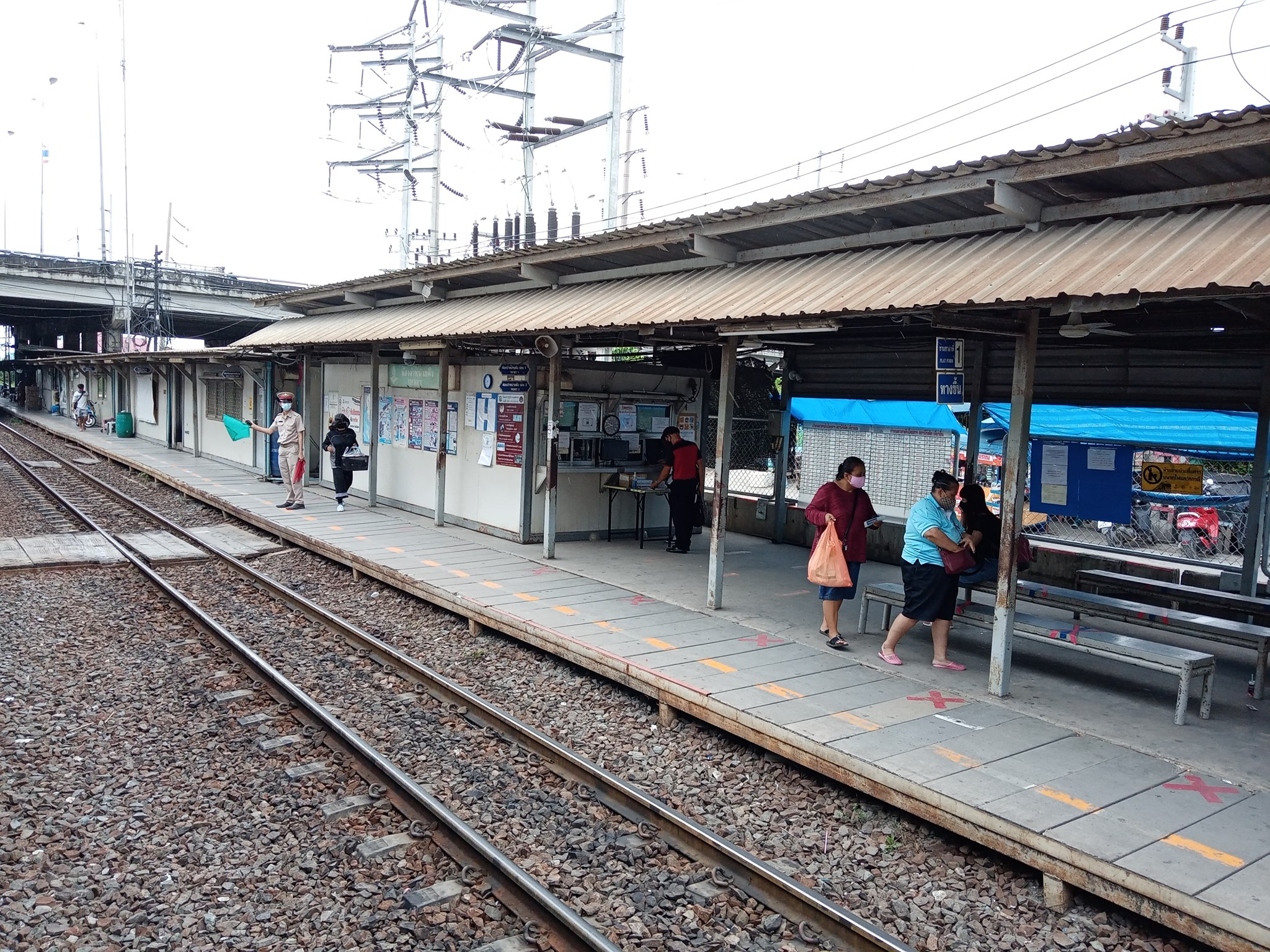
Temporary station structure
