= Red Lines (Bangkok) =

Mass rapid rail system in Thailand

SRT Red Lines

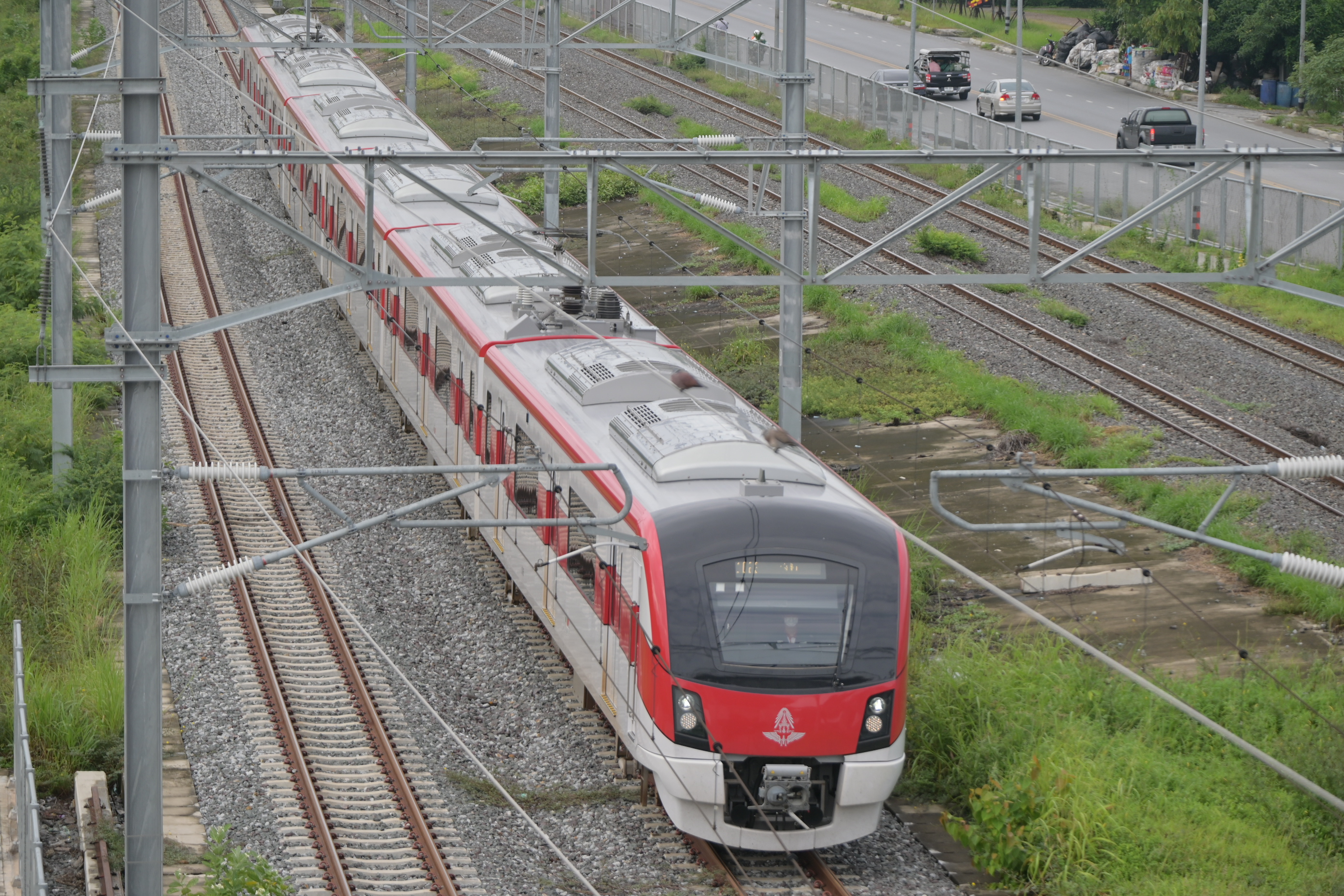
- A Light Red Line train at Lak Hok (Rangsit University) station

Overview
- Native name: รถไฟฟ้าชานเมืองสายสีแดง
- Owner: State Railway of Thailand
- Locale: Bangkok Metropolitan Region
- Transit type: Commuter rail
- Number of lines: Dark Red Line; Light Red Line
- Number of stations: 58 (planned)

Operation
- Began operation: 2 August 2021
- Operator: S.R.T. Electrified Train Company Limited
- Character: Elevated
- Rolling stock: Hitachi AT100
- Number of vehicles: 25 EMUs (130 cars); ten 4 car sets and fifteen 6 car sets

Technical
- System length: 41.26 km (25.64 mi) (operational); 98.04 km (60.92 mi) (planned); 139.3 km (86.56 mi) (total)
- No. of tracks: 2
- Track gauge: 1,000 mm (3 ft 3 3/8 in) metre gauge
- Electrification: 25 kV 50 Hz AC overhead catenary
- Average speed: 120 km/h (75 mph)
- Top speed: 160 km/h (99 mph)

The Red Line Mass Transit System Project is a commuter rail system serving the Bangkok Metropolitan Region in Thailand. The system consists of two lines; the Dark Red Line (Bangkok), running from Thammasat University's Rangsit campus to Maha Chai in Samut Sakhon Province, and the Light Red Line (Bangkok), running from Salaya in Nakhon Pathom Province to Hua Mak in Bangkok, with both passing through Krung Thep Aphiwat Central Terminal, which connects to the Blue Line. Financed through an aid grant from the Japan International Cooperation Agency at a cost of ¥166.9 billion (US$1.6 billion), construction began in January 2009; free public trial operation began on 2 August 2021, the same day that Krung Thep Aphiwat Central Terminal opened; and full commercial service of the lines began in November 2021. It is part of the Mass Rapid Transit Master Plan in Bangkok Metropolitan Region.

Most of the railway runs alongside existing national railroad tracks, eventually replacing them. Segments running through inner-city areas are elevated, and the system is electrified by overhead lines. The system was developed and is owned by the State Railway of Thailand. Since the Red Lines run roughly along the alignment of the failed Hopewell Project, they have been described as a "Hopewell revival".

== See also ==
- Greater Bangkok commuter rail
