= List of Northern Line (Thailand) stations =

List of railway stations on Thailand's Northern Line

The following is a list of Northern Line railway stations. There are 130 railway stations and halts in operation on the Northern Line, some serve major cities and some serve local villages in distant locations where road access is limited. Some station buildings date back over a hundred years, such as Khlong Maphlap Station on the Sawankhalok Branch Line. Some station were rebuilt from wooden structures to modern Thai styled buildings such as Nakhon Sawan Station. The other category of buildings is the small, ornate style of wood-built stations such as Mae Tha Station.

== Stations in operation ==
English name	Thai Name	Number Code	Distance in km	Class	Station Code	Note	Location
Bangkok-Chiang Mai
Bangkok (Hua Lamphong)	กรุงเทพ	1001	0.00	Terminal	กท.		Bangkok
Yommarat	ยมราช	1002	2.17	Halt	ยช.	Wye connecting to the Eastern Line.	Bangkok
Ho Prajae Chit Lada	หอประแจจิตรลดา	1003	3.29	Special Station	จล.	This station is for Chitralada Royal Villa. For royal use only.	Bangkok
Ramathibodi Hospital	โรงพยาบาลรามาธิบดี		3.3	Halt	รธ.		Bangkok
Sam Sen	สามเสน	1004	4.8	1	สส.		Bangkok
Bang Sue Junction	ชุมทางบางซื่อ	1007	7.47	1	บซ.	Interchange to Southern Line and Phahonyothin Freight Terminal.	Bangkok
Krung Thep Aphiwat Central Terminal	กรุงเทพอภิวัฒน์			1		Bangkok's new central station, opened in January 2023.	Bangkok
Don Mueang	ดอนเมือง	1017	22.21	1	ดม.	As of January 2023, long-distance trains continue to Krung Thep Aphiwat, ordinary and commuter trains continue to Bangkok (Hua Lamphong) via Bang Sue Junction.	Bangkok
Rangsit	รังสิต	1021	29.75	1	รต.		Pathum Thani
Khlong Nueng	คลองหนึ่ง	1223	33.84	Halt	ลห.		Pathum Thani
Chiang Rak	เชียงราก	1022	37.47	2	ชร.		Pathum Thani
Thammasat University	มหาวิทยาลัยธรรมศาสตร์	1230	40.19	Halt	ธส.		Pathum Thani
Nava Nakhon	นวนคร	1023	44.12	Halt	วะ.		Pathum Thani
Chiang Rak Noi	เชียงรากน้อย	1024	46.01	2	ชน.		Pathum Thani
Khlong Phutsa	คลองพุทรา	1026	51.88	3	พซ.		Phra Nakhon Si Ayutthaya
Bang Pa-In	บางปะอิน	1028	58.00	1	บอ.		Phra Nakhon Si Ayutthaya
Ban Pho	บ้านโพ	1029	62.75	3	บพ.		Phra Nakhon Si Ayutthaya
Ayutthaya	อยุธยา	1031	71.08	1	อย.		Phra Nakhon Si Ayutthaya
Ban Ma	บ้านม้า	1032	74.69	3	มา.		Phra Nakhon Si Ayutthaya
Map Phra Chan	มาบพระจันทร์	1033	78.98	3	บจ.		Phra Nakhon Si Ayutthaya
Ban Don Klang	บ้านดอนกลาง	1034	82.31	Halt	ลก.		Phra Nakhon Si Ayutthaya
Phra Kaeo	พระแก้ว	1035	85.44	3	พก.		Phra Nakhon Si Ayutthaya
Ban Phachi Junction	ชุมทางบ้านภาชี	1036	89.95	1	ภช.	Interchange to Northeastern Line	Phra Nakhon Si Ayutthaya
Don Ya Nang	ดอนหญ้านาง	1224	93.58	Halt	ญา.		Phra Nakhon Si Ayutthaya
Nong Wiwat	หนองวิวัฒน์	1037	96.44	3	ว ิ.		Phra Nakhon Si Ayutthaya
Ban Plak Raet	บ้านปลักแรด	1038	99.16	Halt	แด.		Phra Nakhon Si Ayutthaya
Tha Ruea	ท่าเรือ	1039	102.73	1	ทร.	Closed branch line to Phra Phutthabat	Phra Nakhon Si Ayutthaya
Ban Mo	บ้านหมอ	1041	108.78	1	มอ.	Closed freight line to SCG Tha Luang	Saraburi
Nong Don	หนองโดน	1045	116.56	2	โด.		Saraburi
Ban Klap Junction	ชุมทางบ้านกลับ	1047	121.72	3	บก.	Became a junction on 5 December 2025	Saraburi
Ban Pa Wai	บ้านป่าหวาย	1048	127.44	3	ปว.		Lopburi
Lop Buri	ลพบุรี	1050	132.81	1	ลบ.		Lopburi
Tha Khae	ท่าแค	1051	137.51	3	ทแ.		Lopburi
Khok Kathiam Junction	ชุมทางโคกกะเทียม	1053	144.23	3	คท.	Became a junction on 5 December 2025	Lopburi
Nong Tao	หนองเต่า	1055	150.08	3	นต.	Closed freight line to Khao Thap Khwai iron ore mine. Only a bridge remains across Anusadsananunt canal.	Lopburi
Nong Sai Khao	หนองทรายขาว	1056	154.93	3	ซข.		Lopburi
Ban Mi	บ้านหมี่	1058	161.22	1	บม.		Lopburi
Huai Kaeo	ห้วยแก้ว	1059	165.94	3	หก.		Lopburi
Phai Yai	ไผ่ใหญ่	1060	170.33	Halt	ผญ.		Lopburi
Rong Rien Chansen	โรงเรียนจันเสน	1223	172.90	Halt	รจ.		Nakhon Sawan
Chansen	จันเสน	1061	173.86	2	จส.		Nakhon Sawan
Ban Kok Kwaow	บ้านกกกว้าว	1062	176.63	Halt	ว ้.		Nakhon Sawan
Chong Khae	ช่องแค	1063	180.20	1	ชค.		Nakhon Sawan
Thale Wa	ทะเลหว้า	1065	187.37	Halt	ทห.		Nakhon Sawan
Phon Thong	โพนทอง	1066	188.65	2	โพ.		Nakhon Sawan
Ban Takhli	บ้านตาคลี	1067	193.02	1	ตล.		Nakhon Sawan
Dong Maku	ดงมะกุ	1069	198.80	3	ดง.		Nakhon Sawan
Hua Wai	หัวหวาย	1070	204.06	3	หว.		Nakhon Sawan
Nong Pho	หนองโพ	1072	211.44	3	นพ.		Nakhon Sawan
Hua Ngiu	หัวงิ้ว	1074	217.22	3	หง.		Nakhon Sawan
Noen Makok	เนินมะกอก	1076	224.81	3	มก.		Nakhon Sawan
Khao Thong	เขาทอง	1079	235.49	3	ขท.		Nakhon Sawan
Nakhon Sawan	นครสวรรค์	1082	245.78	1	นว.		Nakhon Sawan
Pak Nam Pho	ปากน้ำโพ	1083	250.56	1	ปพ.	Freight line to Kamnan Song Rice Mill.	Nakhon Sawan
Bueng Boraphet	บึงบอระเพ็ด	1226	257.15	3	เพ.		Nakhon Sawan
Thap Krit	ทับกฤช	1084	263.68	2	ทก.		Nakhon Sawan
Khlong Pla Kot	คลองปลากด	1086	270.87	3	ปก.		Nakhon Sawan
Chumsaeng	ชุมแสง	1088	280.29	1	ชส.		Nakhon Sawan
Wang Krang	วังกร่าง	1091	290.24	3	กา.		Phichit
Bang Mun Nak	บางมูลนาก	1093	297.03	1	นา.		Phichit
Ho Krai	หอไกร	1095	303.50	3	ไก.		Phichit
Dong Takhop	ดงตะขบ	1097	309.87	3	ดข.		Phichit
Taphan Hin	ตะพานหิน	1099	319.00	1	ตห.		Phichit
Huai Ket	ห้วยเกตุ	1101	324.91	3	ยต.		Phichit
Hua Dong	หัวดง	1103	332.60	2	หด.		Phichit
Wang Krot	วังกรด	1105	339.36	2	วร.		Phichit
Phichit	พิจิตร	1107	346.79	1	พจ.		Phichit
Tha Lo	ท่าฬ่อ	1109	354.26	3	ทฬ.		Phichit
Bang Krathum	บางกระทุ่ม	1111	362.22	2	ทม.		Phitsanulok
Mae Thiap	แม่เทียบ	1112	366.21	3	แท.		Phitsanulok
Ban Mai	บ้านใหม่	1114	375.31	3	บห.		Phitsanulok
Bueng Phra	บึงพระ	1116	381.87	1	บะ.	Sirikit Oil Pool Terminal. Oil trains to Bangchak Oil refinery, Bangkok start here.	Phitsanulok
Phitsanulok	พิษณุโลก	1118	389.28	1	พล.		Phitsanulok
Ban Teng Nam	บ้านเต็งหนาม	1119	393.75	3	เห.		Phitsanulok
Ban Tum	บ้านตูม	1121	400.00	3	ตม.		Phitsanulok
Khwae Noi	แควน้อย	1122	405.31	3	คน.		Phitsanulok
Phrom Phiram	พรหมพิราม	1125	414.50	2	พห.		Phitsanulok
Nong Tom	หนองตม	1127	423.20	2	หต.		Phitsanulok
Ban Bung	บ้านบุ่ง	1130	432.75	3	บง.		Phitsanulok
Ban Khon	บ้านโคน	1131	437.41	3	บค.		Uttaradit
Phichai	พิชัย	1134	447.55	1	พย.		Uttaradit
Rai Oi	ไร่อ้อย	1136	453.98	3	รอ.		Uttaradit
Ban Dara Junction	ชุมทางบ้านดารา	1137	458.31	3	ดร.	Interchange for Sawankhalok Line	Uttaradit
Tha Sak	ท่าสัก	1144	461.80	2	าส.		Uttaradit
Tron	ตรอน	1146	469.86	1	ตอ.		Uttaradit
Wang Kaphi	วังกะพี้	1148	476.82	3	วก.		Uttaradit
Uttaradit	อุตรดิตถ์	1150	485.17	1	อด.		Uttaradit
Sila At	ศิลาอาสน์	1151	487.52	1	ศล.	Northern Line Logistics Headquarters	Uttaradit
Tha Sao	ท่าเสา	1152	489.35	Halt	เส.		Uttaradit
Ban Dan	บ้านด่าน	1154	497.56	3	บด.		Uttaradit
Pang Ton Phueng	ปางต้นผึ้ง	1157	509.36	3	ปต.		Uttaradit
Pang Tub Khob Tunnel length 102.09 m (513.72-513.84)
Khao Phlueng Tunnel length 362.44 m (516.41-516.77)
Khao Phlung	เขาพลึง	1159	517.02	Halt	ขง.		Phrae
Huai Rai	ห้วยไร่	1160	521.48	3	หา.		Phrae
Rai Kled Dao	ไร่เกล็ดดาว	1161	525.60	Halt	รล.		Phrae
Mae Phuak	แม่พวก	1162	528.22	Halt	มพ.		Phrae
Den Chai	เด่นชัย	1164	533.94	1	ดช.	Provincial station for Phrae	Phrae
Pak Pan	ปากปาน	1165	538.43	3	ปา.		Phrae
Kaeng Luang	แก่งหลวง	1167	546.94	3	กล.		Phrae
Huai Mae Ta	ห้วยแม่ต้า	1169	554.42	Halt	วต.		Phrae
Ban Pin	บ้านปิน	1172	563.86	2	บป.		Phrae
Huai Mae Lan Tunnel length 130.20 m (574.04-574.17)
Pha Khan	ผาคัน	1176	578.46	3	ผน.		Phrae
Pha Kho	ผาคอ	1177	581.22	Halt	ผค.		Phrae
Pang Puai	ปางป๋วย	1180	591.07	3	ปย.		Lampang
Mae Chang	แม่จาง	1182	600.33	3	มจ.		Lampang
Mae Mo	แม่เมาะ	1184	609.16	2	มม.		Lampang
Huai Rak Mai	ห้วยรากไม้	1185	614.15	Halt	รไ.		Lampang
Sala Pha Lat	ศาลาผาลาด	1187	622.20	3	ผล.		Lampang
Mae Tha	แม่ทะ	1189	628.45	2	มท.		Lampang
Nong Wua Thao	หนองวัวเฒ่า	1192	637.41	3	วถ.		Lampang
Nakhon Lampang	นครลำปาง	1193	642.29	1	ลป.		Lampang
Hang Chat	ห้างฉัตร	1196	654.85	3	หฉ.		Lampang
Pang Muang	ปางม่วง	1198	660.98	3	ปม.		Lampang
Huai Rian	ห้วยเรียน	1199	665.09	Halt	ยเ.		Lampang
Mae Tan Noi	แม่ตานน้อย	1201	671.80	3	มต.		Lampang
Khun Tan Tunnel length 1352.10 m (681.57-682.93)
Khun Tan	ขุนตาน	1204	683.14	2	ขน.		Lamphun
Tha Chomphu	ทาชมภู	1206	691.89	3	าช.		Lamphun
Sala Mae Tha	ศาลาแม่ทา	1208	700.68	3	ลท.		Lamphun
Nong Lom	หนองหล่ม	1212	713.01	3	งล.		Lamphun
Lamphun	ลำพูน	1216	729.21	1	ลพ.		Lamphun
Pa Sao	ป่าเส้า	1218	734.64	3	ปส.		Lamphun
Saraphi	สารภี	1220	742.78	3	ภ ี.		Chiang Mai
Chiang Mai	เชียงใหม่	1222	751.42	1	ชม.		Chiang Mai
Ban Dara Junction-Sawankhalok
Ban Dara Junction	ชุมทางบ้านดารา	1137	458.31	3	ดร.	The terminal of Sawankhalok Line	Uttaradit
Khlong Maphlap	คลองมะพลับ	11	470.27	3	มป.		Sukhothai
Sawankhalok	สวรรคโลก	11	487.14	3	สว.		Sukhothai
Ban Klap Junction-Khok Kathiam Junction (Lopburi Bypass Line)
Ban Klap Junction	ชุมทางบ้านกลับ	1047	121.72	3	บก.		Saraburi
Lopburi 2 (Tha Wung)	ลพบุรี 2 (ท่าวุ้ง)	1049	141.75	1	-	Opened 5 December 2025	Lopburi
Khok Kathiam Junction	ชุมทางโคกกะเทียม	1053	144.23	3	คท.		Lopburi

== Closed Stations ==
=== Main Line ===
Name	Name in Thai	Located between	Province	Notes
Pradiphat	ประดิพัทธ์	Sam Sen-Bang Sue Junction	Bangkok	
Ban Nong Mu	บ้านหนองหมู	Hua Ngiu–Noen Makok	Nakhon Sawan	
Thung Nam Sum	ทุ่งน้ำซึม	Noen Makok–Khao Thong	Nakhon Sawan	
Ang Hin	อ่างหิน	Khao Thong–Nakhon Sawan	Nakhon Sawan	
Nam Rit	น้ำริด	Tha Sao Halt–Ban Dan	Uttaradit	Turned into Community Library
Huai Mae Lan	ห้วยแม่ลาน	Ban Pin–Pha Khan	Phrae	
Bo Haeo	บ่อแฮ้ว	Nakhon Lampang–Hang Chat	Lampang	Decreased Usage led to closure
Huai Kiang	ห้วยเกี๋ยง	Sala Maetha–Nong Lom	Lamphun	
Doi Ti	ดอยติ	Nong Lom–Lamphun	Lamphun	Decreased Usage led to closure

=== Sawankhalok Branch Line ===
Name	Name in Thai	Located between	Province	Notes
Khlong Lamung	คลองละมุง	Ban Dara Junction–Khlong Maphlap	Uttaradit	Structure unremoved
Wat Khlong Pu	วัดคลองปู	Khlong Maphlap–Sawankhalok	Sukhothai	Structure unremoved
Khlong Yang	คลองยาง	Khlong Maphlap–Sawankhalok	Sukhothai	Structure unremoved
Nong Riang	หนองเรียง	Khlong Maphlap–Sawankhalok	Sukhothai	Structure unremoved

== See also ==
- Northern Line (Thailand)
- Rail transport in Thailand
