= Bang Krathum railway station =

Railway station in Thailand

Coordinates: 16.5767°N 100.2989°E

Bang Krathum บางกระทุ่ม

General information
- Location: Mu 4, Bang Krathum Subdistrict, Bang Krathum District, Phitsanulok
- Owner: State Railway of Thailand
- Line: Northern Line
- Platforms: 1
- Tracks: 2

Other information
- Station code: ทม.

History
- Opened: 24 January 1908; 118 years ago

Services
Preceding station	State Railway of Thailand	Following station
Tha Lo towards Hua Lamphong or Krung Thep Aphiwat	Northern Line	Mae Thiap towards Chiang Mai
Location

Bang Krathum station (Thai: สถานีบางกระทุ่ม) is a railway station located in Bang Krathum Subdistrict, Bang Krathum District, Phitsanulok. It is located 362.225 km from Bangkok Railway Station and is a class 2 railway station. It is on the Northern Line of the State Railway of Thailand. The station opened on 24 January 1908 as part of the Northern Line extension from Pak Nam Pho to Phitsanulok.
