= Bang Mun Nak railway station =

Railway station in Thailand

Bang Mun Nak บางมูลนาก
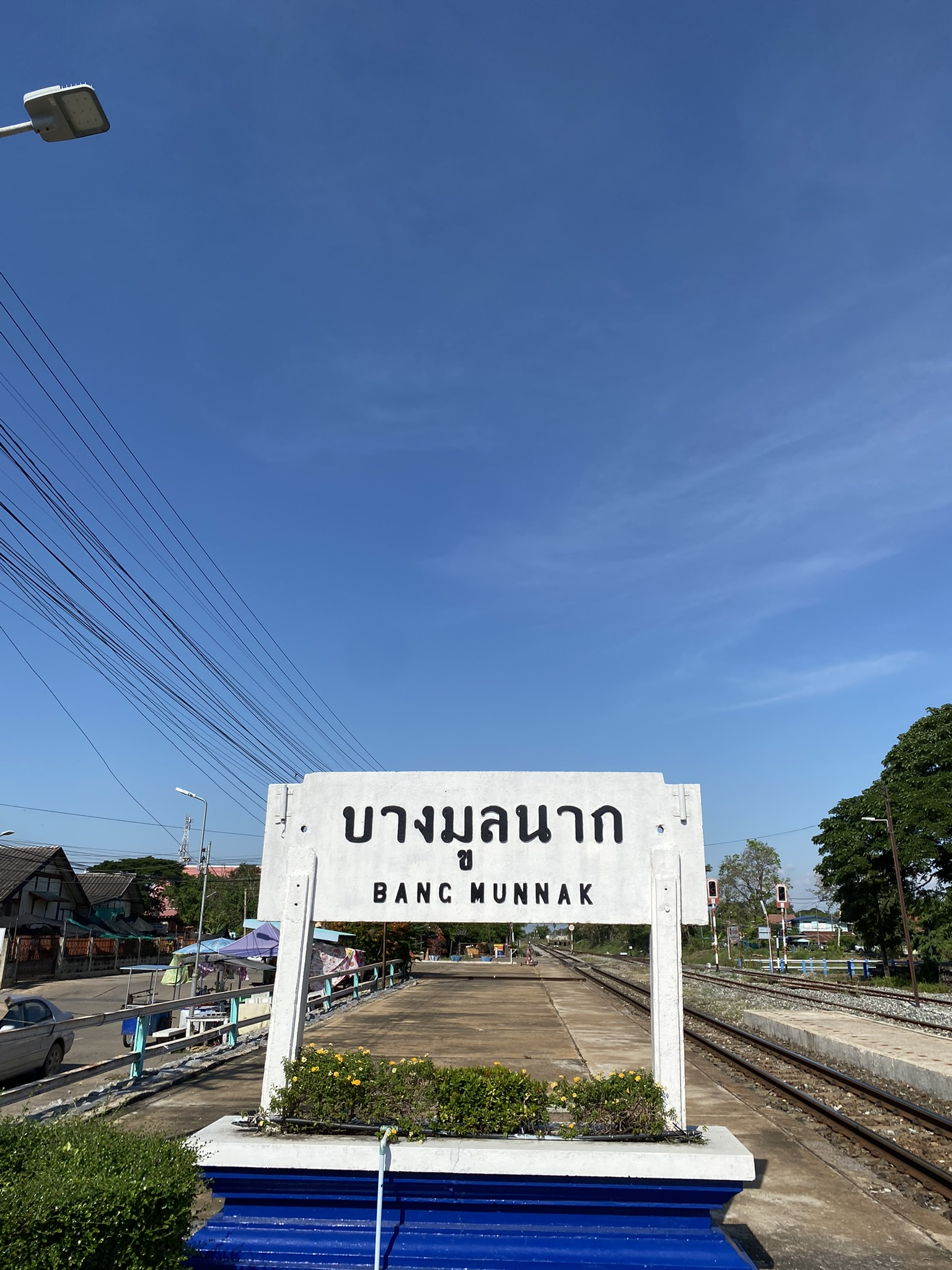
- Bang Mun Nak railway station sign

General information
- Location: Noen Makok Subdistrict, Bang Mun Nak District, Phichit
- Coordinates: 16.0287°N 100.3810°E
- Owner: State Railway of Thailand
- Line: Northern Line
- Platforms: 2
- Tracks: 3

Other information
- Station code: นา.

History
- Opened: 24 January 1908; 118 years ago

Services
Preceding station	State Railway of Thailand	Following station
Wang Krang towards Hua Lamphong or Krung Thep Aphiwat	Northern Line	Ho Krai towards Chiang Mai
Location

Bang Mun Nak railway station is a railway station located in Noen Makok Subdistrict, Bang Mun Nak District, Phichit. It is located 297.036 km from Bangkok Railway Station and is a class 1 railway station. It is on the Northern Line of the State Railway of Thailand. The station opened on 24 January 1908 as part of the Northern Line extension from Pak Nam Pho to Phitsanulok.
