= Phichit railway station =

Railway station in Phichit Province, Thailand

Coordinates: 16°26′52″N 100°20′48″E

Phichit พิจิตร
- Station in 2026

General information
- Location: Fang Sathani Rotfai Road, Nai Muang Sub-district, Phichit City
- Owner: State Railway of Thailand
- Line: Northern Line
- Platforms: 2
- Tracks: 3

Construction
- Parking: yes

Other information
- Station code: พจ.

History
- Opened: 24 January 1908

Services
Preceding station	State Railway of Thailand	Following station
Wang Krot towards Hua Lamphong or Krung Thep Aphiwat	Northern Line	Tha Lo towards Chiang Mai
Location

Phichit railway station is the main railway station of Phichit Province. It is a Class 1 Station 347 kilometres (215.6 mi) north of Bangkok railway station. The station opened on 24 January 1908 as part of the Northern Line extension from Pak Nam Pho to Phitsanulok.

The station building, along with the Phitsanulok and Paet Riu station building, is built in Neo-Classical style. However, the bombings of Phitsanulok railway station during World War II along with the closure and demolition of the former Paet Riu station in the 1960s led Phichit station to be the only railway station in Thailand with a Neo-Classical building.

== Gallery ==
Station platform
