= Phitsanulok province =

Province of Thailand

Phitsanulok พิษณุโลก
- Province
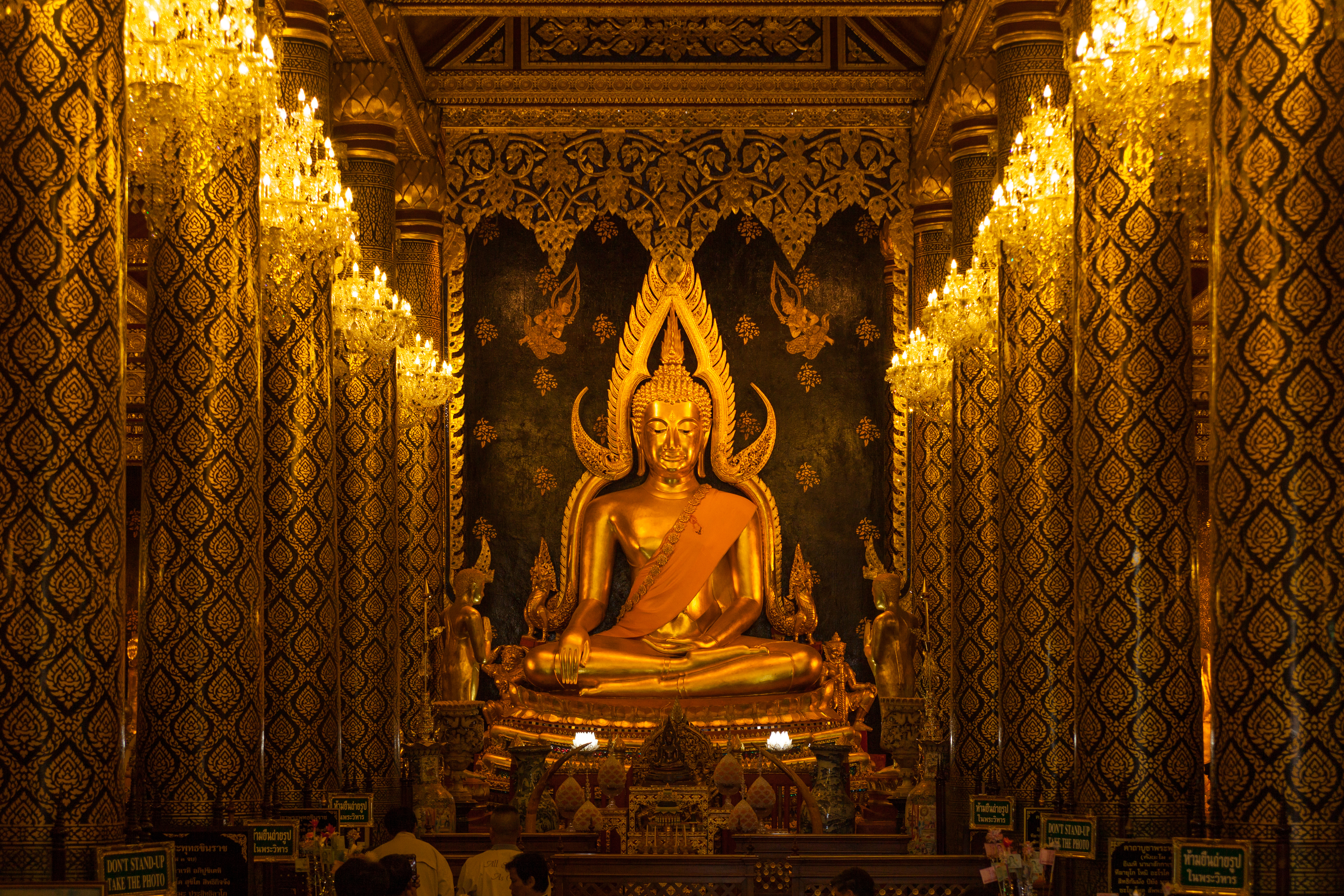
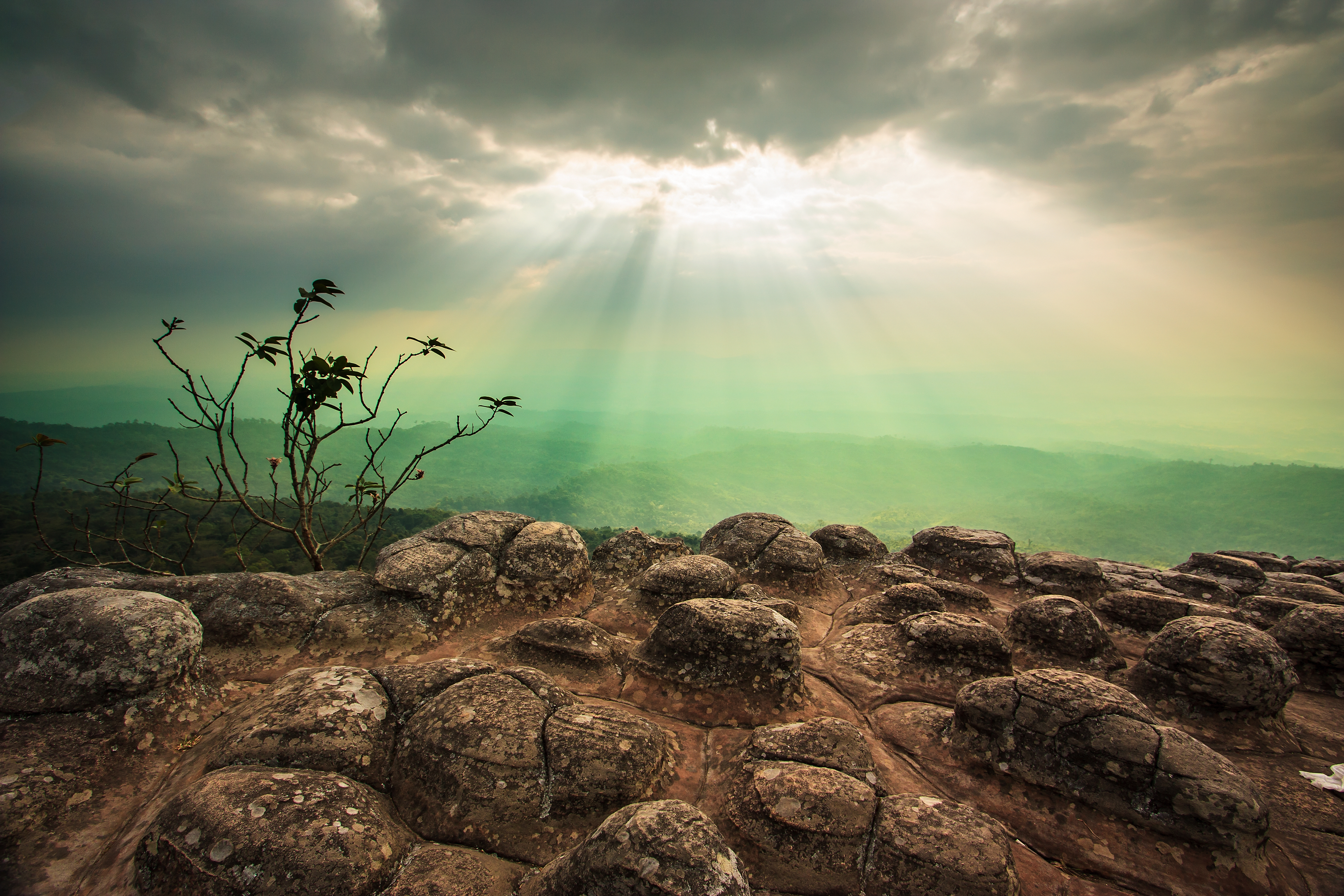
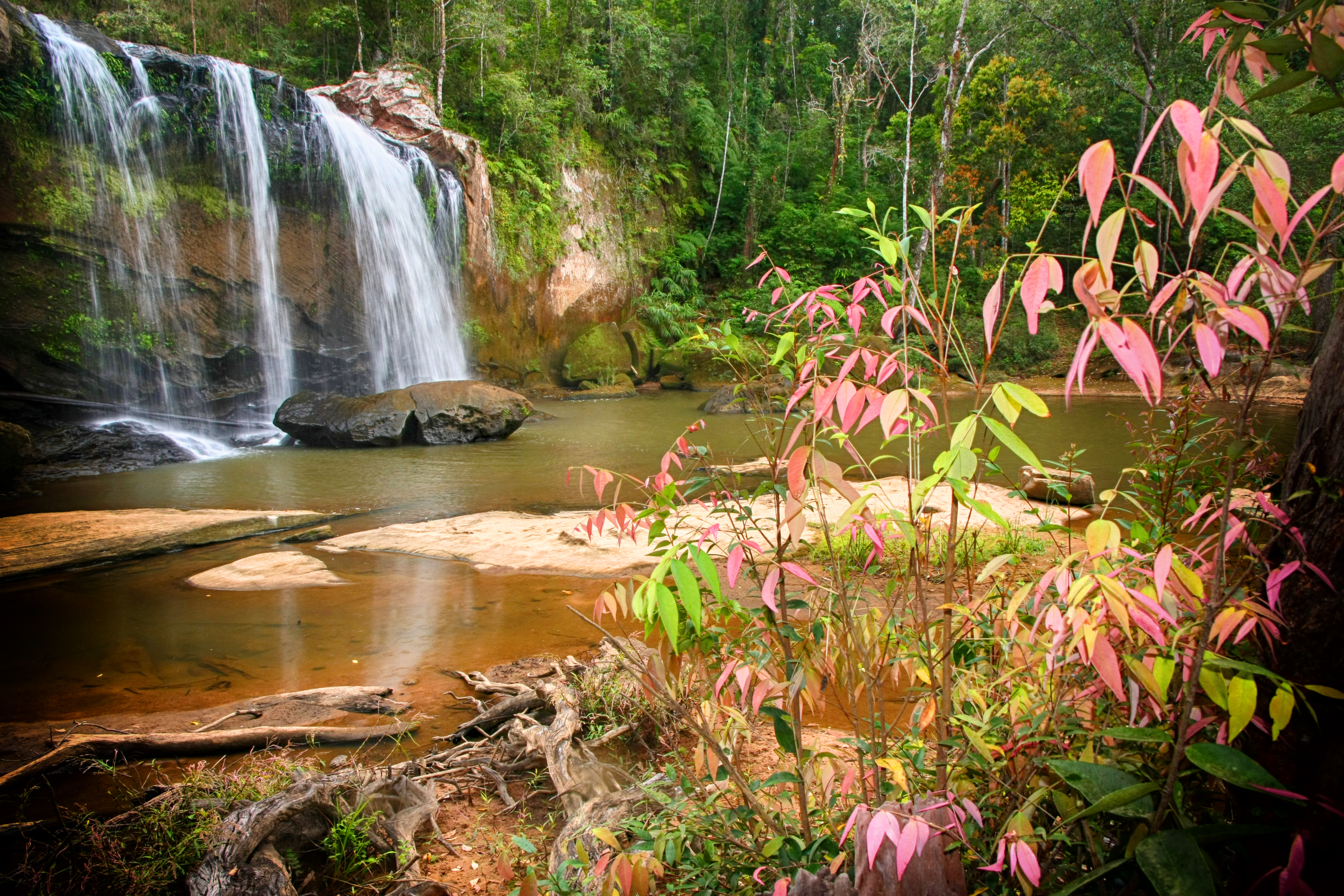
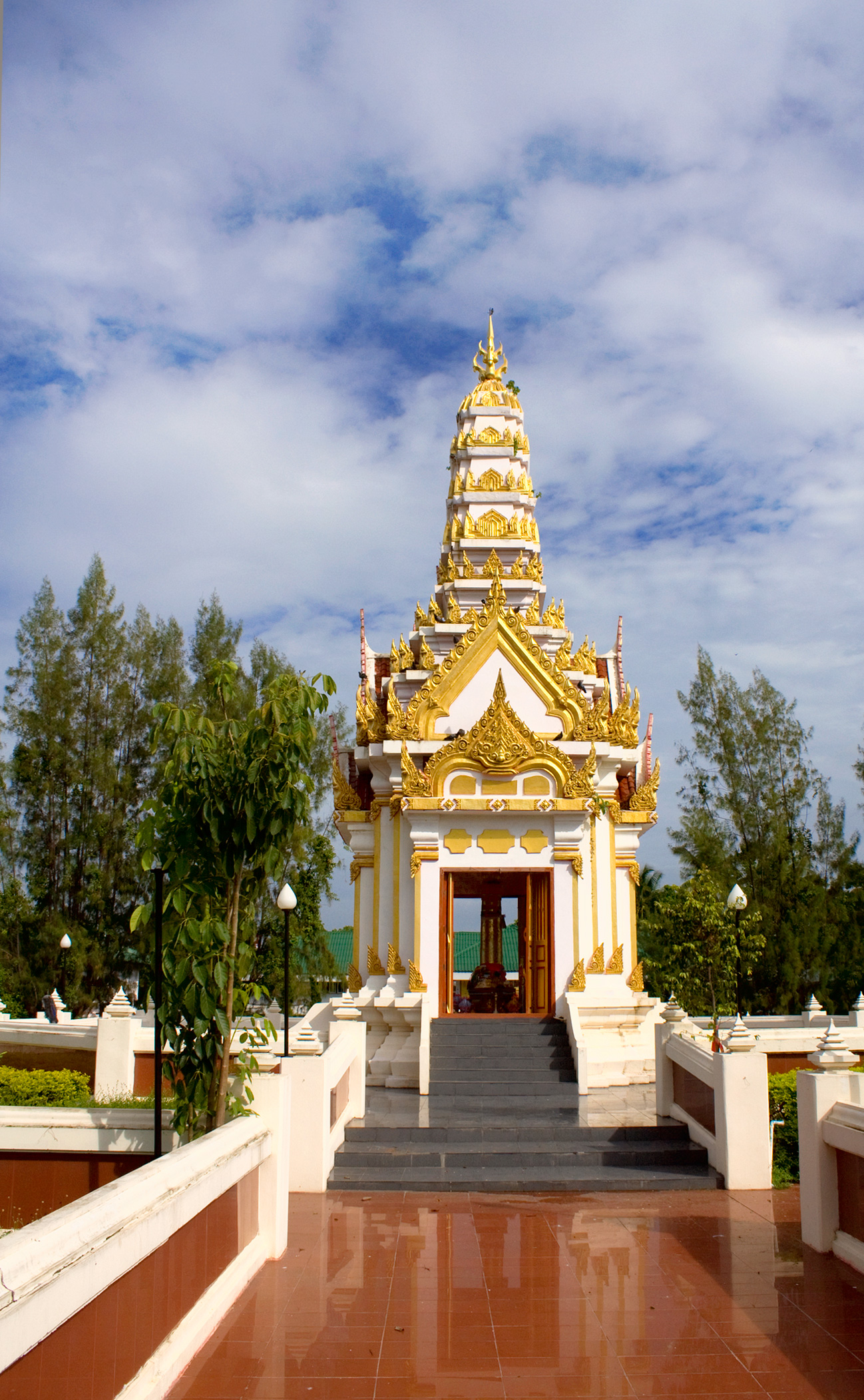
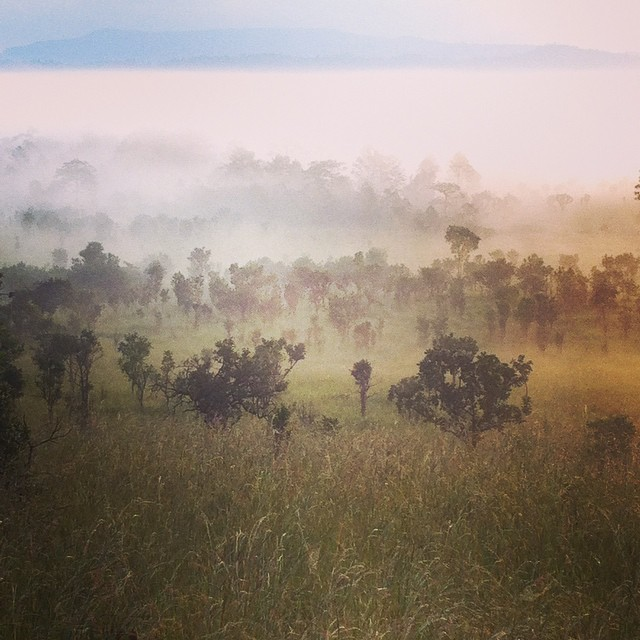
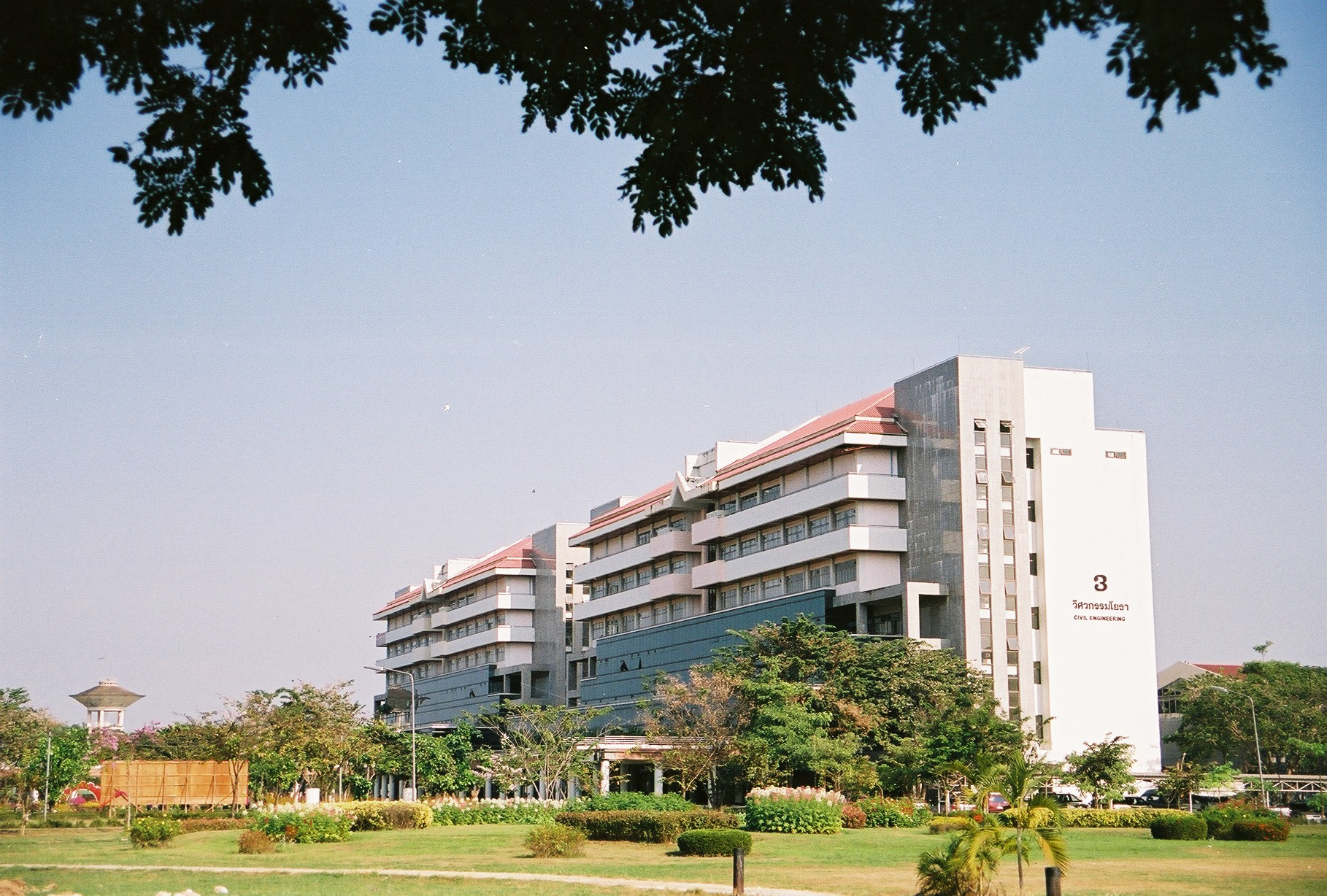
- From left to right, top to bottom : Wat Phra Si Rattana Mahathat, Phu Hin Rong Kla National Park, Namtok Chat Trakan National Park, Phitsanulok City Pillar Shrine, Thung Salaeng Luang National Park, Naresuan University

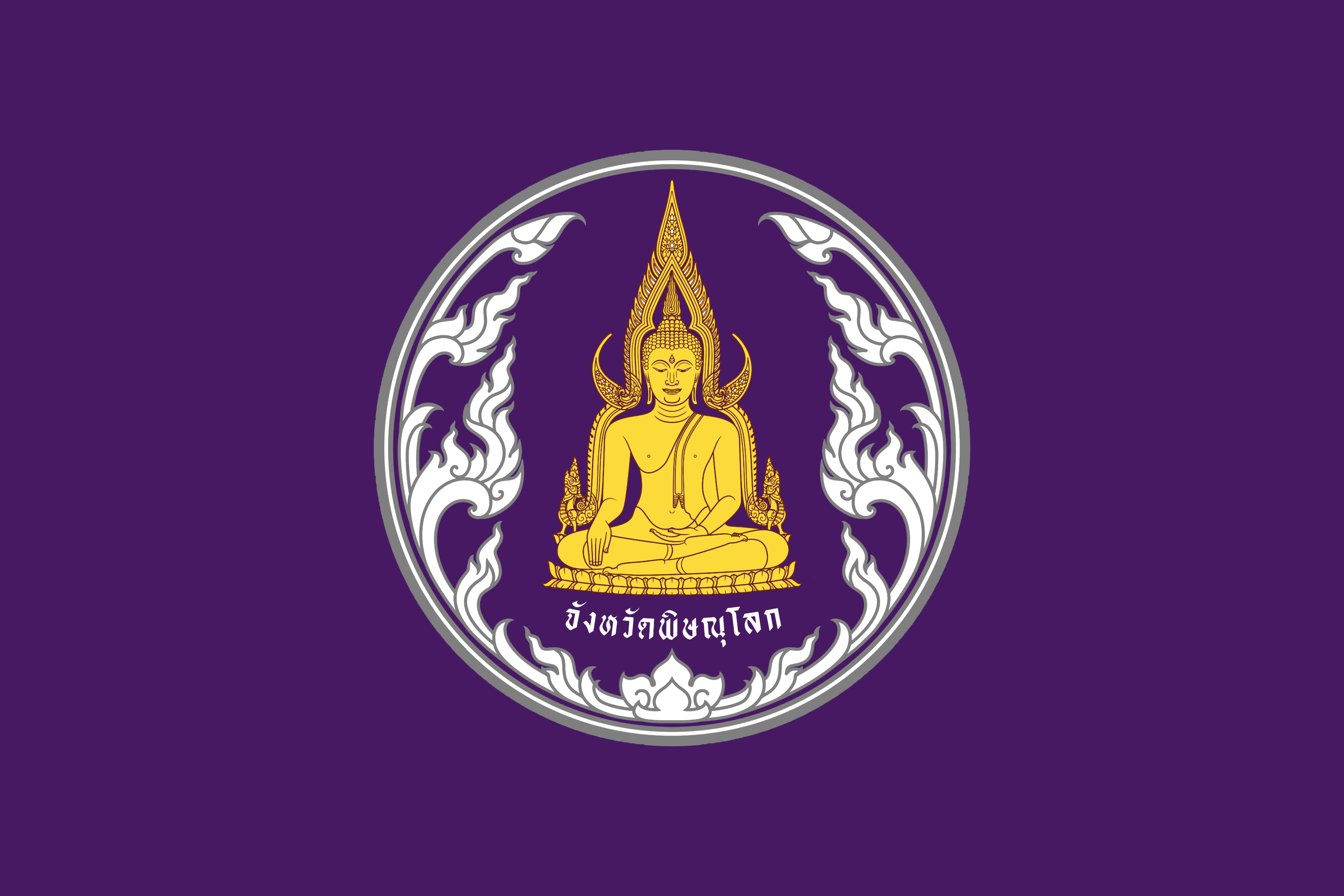
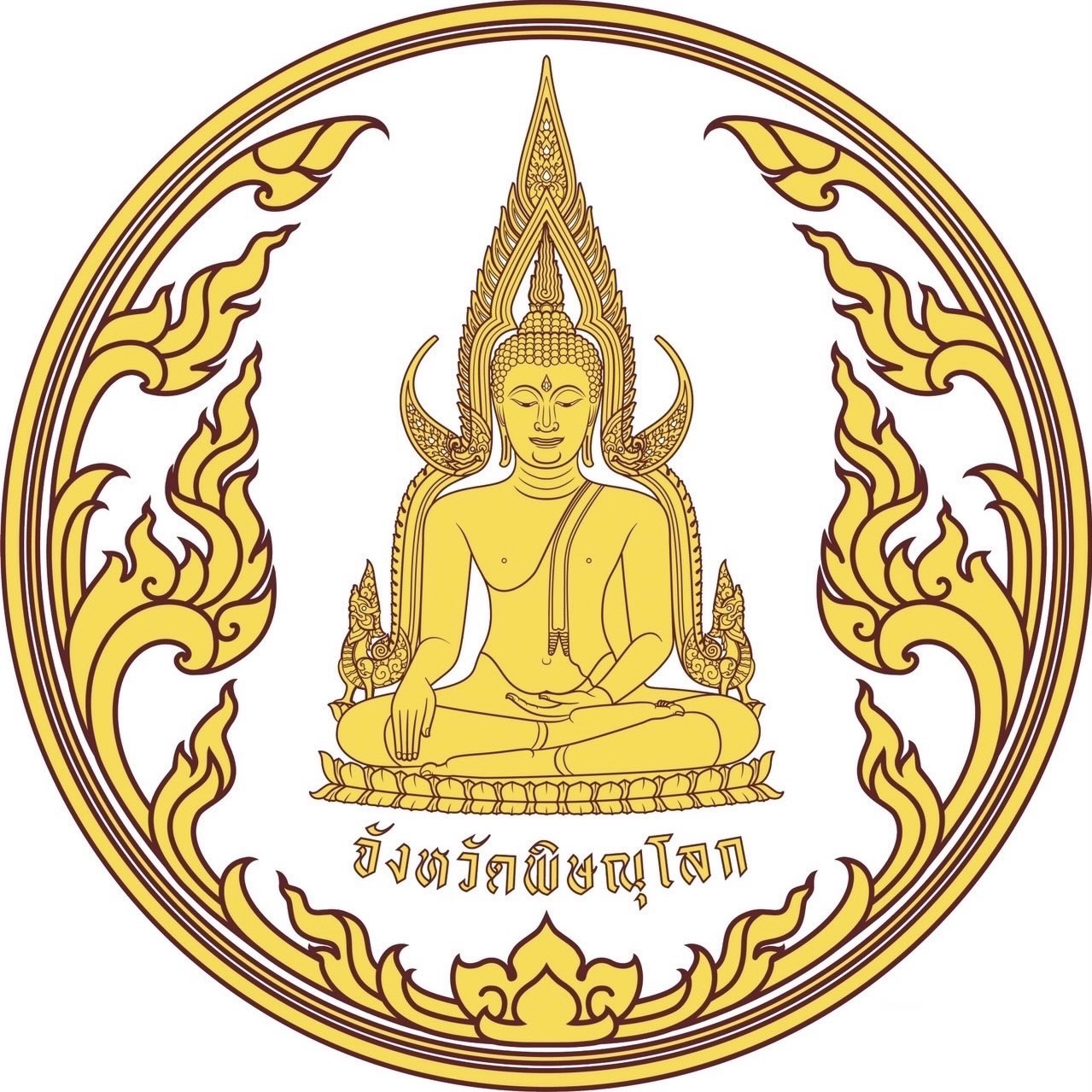
- Flag Seal
- Nickname: Mueang Song Khwae (Thai: เมืองสองแคว) (City of two tributaries)
- Mottoes: พระพุทธชินราชงามเลิศ ถิ่นกำเนิดพระนเรศวร สองฝั่งน่านล้วนเรือนแพ หวานฉ่ำแท้กล้วยตาก ถ้ำและน้ำตกหลากตระการตา ("Beautiful Phra Phuttha Chinnarat. Hometown of King Naresuan. Raft homes of the Nan River. Truly sweet dried bananas. Amazing caves and waterfalls.")
- Map of Thailand highlighting Phitsanulok province
- Country: Thailand
- Capital: Phitsanulok

Government
  - Governor: Kiattisak Trongsiri

Area
  - Total: 10,589 km^{2} (4,088 sq mi)
  - Rank: 15th

Population (2024)
  - Total: ▼839,116
  - Rank: 28th
  - Density: 79/km^{2} (200/sq mi)
  - Rank: 62nd

Human Achievement Index
  - HAI (2022): 0.6190 "low" Ranked 67th

GDP
  - Total: baht 93 billion (US$3.2 billion) (2019)
- Time zone: UTC+7 (ICT)
- Postal code: 65xxx
- Calling code: 055
- ISO 3166 code: TH-65
- Vehicle registration: พิษณุโลก
- Founded: 11th century
- Website: phitsanulok.go.th

Phitsanulok Provincial Administrative Organization องค์การบริหารส่วนจังหวัดพิษณุโลก
- Provincial Administrative Organization
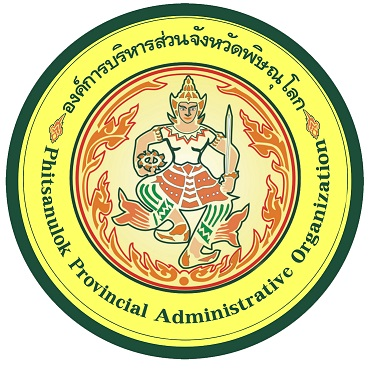
- Seal
- Interactive map of Phitsanulok Provincial Administrative Organization

Government
  - Type: Local administrative divisions
  - Body: Phitsanulok Provincial Administrative Organization
  - President: Monchai Wiwadhanart
- Website: ppao.go.th

Phitsanulok (Thai: พิษณุโลก, pronounced [pʰít.sā.nú.lôːk]; lit. 'Vishnu's realm') is a province of central Thailand. (Note: According to Royal Society of Thailand, Phitsanulok is categorized into central Thailand. But some officials such as Office of the National Economic and Social Development Council or Tourism Authority of Thailand category it into lower northern region.) It borders the provinces of Uttaradit to the north, Loei and Phetchabun to the east, Phichit to the south, Kamphaeng Phet to the southwest, and Sukhothai to the west. Its border was shared with Laos (Sainyabuli) to the northeast. Covering an area of 10,589 square kilometres (4,088 sq mi), Phitsanulok is the fifteenth-largest province in Thailand. As of 2024, it has a population of about 840,000, making it the eighth-most populous province in the region.

Settlement in what is now Phitsanulok began in the Stone Age. In the 11th and 12th centuries the area held early city-states such as Song Khwae, Nakhon Thai. From the 13th century onward, Phitsanulok became a major city in Sukhothai and Ayutthaya Kingdom, even serving as the capital city of both. It retained strategic importance during the Thonburi and early Rattanakosin period. After the monthon system was organized in 1897, Phitsanulok became the center of Monthon Phitsanulok, which grouped provinces of the lower northern region.

As a transport hub with a long history, Phitsanulok is the center of lower northern Thailand. It is known for Wat Phra Si Rattana Mahathat, a Buddhist temple where the famous gold-covered statue of the Buddha, Phra Phuttha Chinnarat (พระพุทธชินราช), is located.

== History ==
The lands of present-day Phitsanulok province were inhabited since the Stone Age. The earliest historical records relating to the area indicate that at a time prior to or during the 11th century, the present-day city of Phitsanulok was a small strategic known as Song Khwae (Thai: สองแคว). The Ayutthaya annals call the place Chainat before 1463, where the Sukhothai inscriptions call it Song Khwae. Chusak Satienpattanodom reads Song Khwae as belonging in the 13th century not to Sukhothai but to the realm of Pha Mueang, held by Phaya Khamhaeng Phra Ram, whom he takes for Pha Mueang's younger brother. During the next century, in 1188, Nakhon Thai, near the center of the present Phitsanulok province, was established as the capital city of the Singhanavati Kingdom, an early city-state of Thailand. The year 1188 appears in Simon de La Loubère's account, taken from informants at Ayutthaya, that the ancestors of King Uthong had lived at Nakhon Thai from that date. The Luang Prasert chronicle records the founding of Nakhon Thai in 1477, although it has families fleeing Nakhon Thai for Nan in 1462. Sujit Wongthes and Srisakara Vallibhotama surveyed the town and recorded three earthen walls with moats between them, and traces of settlement on the nearby hills and in caves. They also found Lopburi-style Buddha images, some left unfinished, which Sujit took to have been made at Nakhon Thai.

Later, during Thailand's Sukhothai Period, the city of Phitsanulok emerged as a major city in the east of the Sukhothai Kingdom, and the great temples of Wat Chula Manee, Wat Aranyik and Wat Chedi Yod Thong were constructed. In 1357, the renowned Wat Phra Sri Rattana Mahathat was erected, and the Ayutthaya Period witnessed the construction of several of the province's other chief temples. An Ayutthayan army under Borommarachathirat I took the town in 1378 and received the homage of Maha Thammaracha II. After Sukhothai was divided in the early 15th century, Phitsanulok fell to Maha Thammaracha Boromapan. In 1430 a dispute over the right of a returning forest-order party to ordain was settled by a debate held on two rafts at Song Khwae, which monks of Chaliang won. Dutch records of the 17th century have the northern forest produce, deer hide and timber, collected through Phitsanulok and Kamphaeng Phet. Borommatrailokkanat moved his court there in 1463, merging Chainat and Song Khwae within one wall, and held it until his death in 1488. Phitsanulok served for 25 years as the capital city of the Ayutthaya Kingdom. Under the Palace Law the governorship was reserved for the Royal Scion, and successive viceroys of Phitsanulok went on to succeed at Ayutthaya. In 1555, King Naresuan the Great was born in Phitsanulok. Naresuan played a significant role in the history of Thailand, as he expanded the kingdom (then called Siam) to its greatest territorial extent by conquering sizable portions of modern-day Burma and Cambodia.

Khwanmueang Chantarochanee, as reported by Chaipong Samnieng, relates the recovery of the northern towns after they were emptied in 1775 and 1776 to two later movements of people: the Mon migration of 1815 and the crisis of Chao Anouvong in 1826. Mon and Lao culture entered Phitsanulok, Phichai, Sawankhalok, Sukhothai and Tak with them.

In recent times, Phitsanulok province has become an important agricultural center, part of the "bread basket of Thailand", providing rice and other crops to consumers in Thailand and throughout the world. Extensive agricultural development over the last hundred years or so has spawned a modern infrastructure in the urban areas of the province, bringing with it an array of modern roads, universities, hospitals and other conveniences. Over the years, the Nan River and its tributaries have played a substantial role in the history and development of the region by providing a route for transportation, fertile soil for agriculture, and water for irrigation. The river waters have also served as a route for enemy invaders, and have been the source of periodic widespread flooding throughout the province.

== Symbols ==
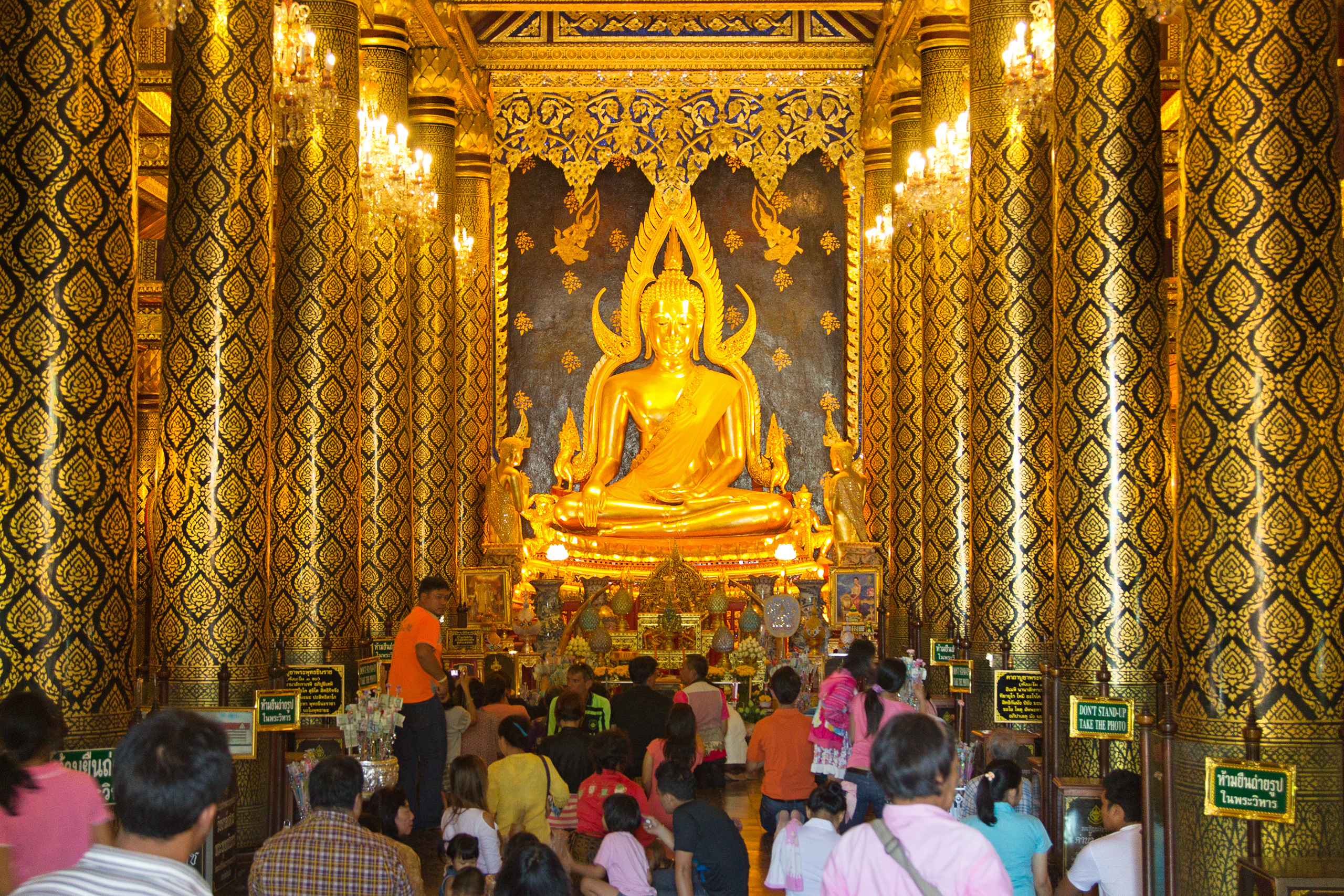
Phra Phuttha Chinnarat

- The provincial seal depicts Phra Phuttha Chinnarat, considered one of the most beautiful Buddha figures in Thailand.
- The provincial flag is purple with the provincial seal in the middle of the flag.
- The provincial tree is the tree jasmine, Thai dok phip ดอกปีบ or kasalong กาสะลอง.
- The provincial flower is the yellow flame tree, Thai dok nonthri ดอกนนทรี.
- The provincial animal is the Thai Bangkaew Dog, in Thai sunakh bangkaew สุนัขบางแก้ว.
- The provincial aquatic animal is the Asian redtail catfish, in Thai pla kot kang ปลากดคัง.
- The provincial mascot is the yellow white tail fighting cock, Thai kai lueng hang khao ไก่เหลืองหางขาว.
- The provincial motto is, "Beautiful Phra Phuttha Chinnarat. Hometown of King Naresuan. Raft homes of the Nan River. Truly sweet dried bananas. Amazing caves and waterfalls."

== Geography ==
=== Location ===
Phitsanulok province, one of the provinces of Thailand in the lower northern region, is approximately 377 km (234 mi) north of Bangkok by road. The province is bordered to the north by Phichai District, Thong Saen Khan District and Nam Pat District of Uttaradit province and Lao People's Democratic Republic. To the east it is bordered by Na Haeo District and Dan Sai District of Loei province, Khao Kho District and Wang Pong District of Phetchabun province. To the south it is bordered by Wang Sai Phun District, Sak Lek District, Sam Ngam District and Mueang Phichit District of Phichit province. To the west it is bordered by Lan Krabue District of Kamphaeng Phet province and Khiri Mat District and Kong Krailat District of Sukhothai province. Its area is 10,589 km^{2} (4,088 sq mi), or 6.16% of the area of northern Thailand and 2.05% of area in Thailand.

=== National parks ===
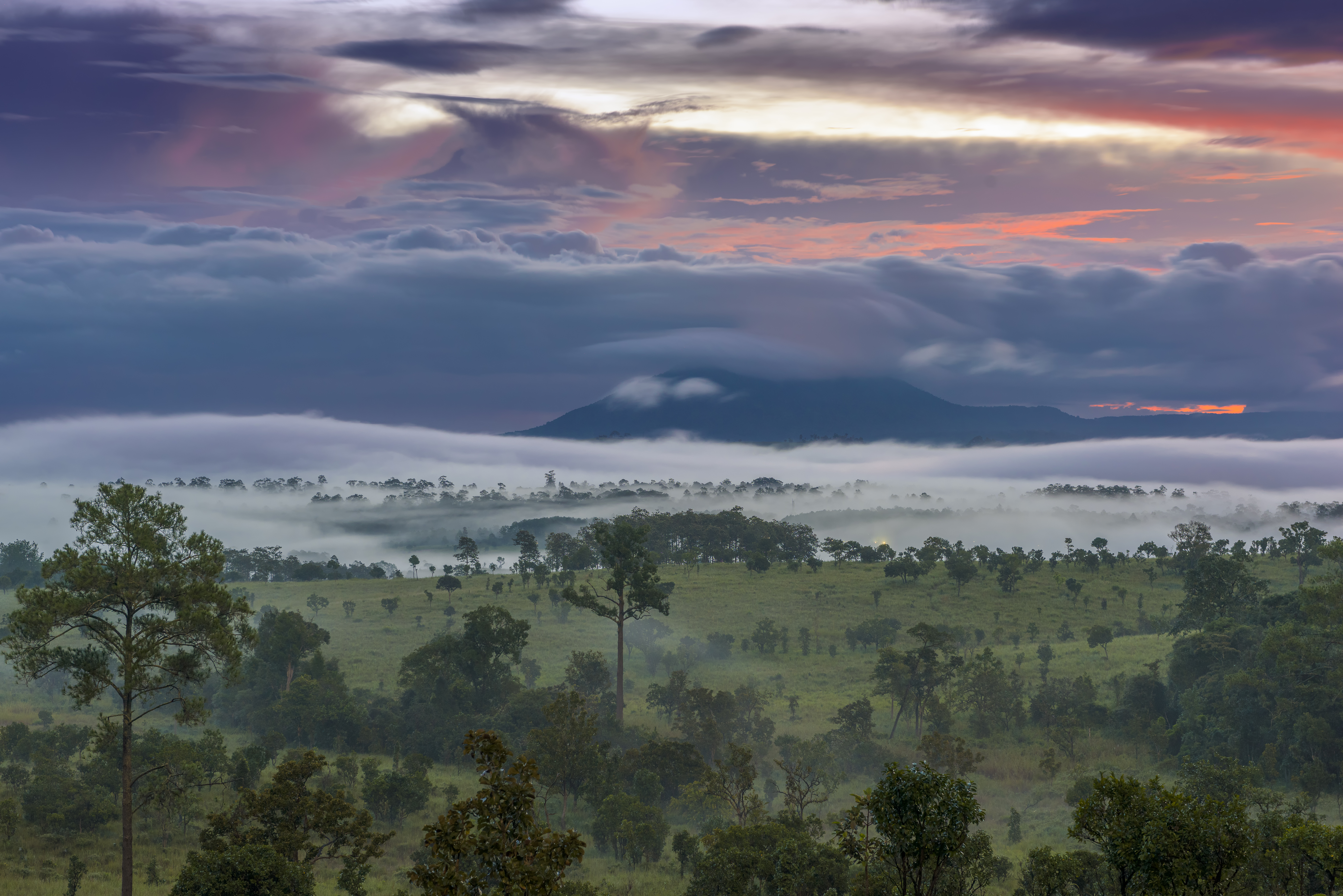
Thung Salaeng Luang National Park

There are ten national parks in region 11 (Phitsanulok), of which five are in Phitsanulok province. (Visitors in fiscal year 2024)

Thung Salaeng Luang National Park	1,262 km^{2} (487 sq mi)	(47,395)
Namtok Chat Trakan National Park	543 km^{2} (210 sq mi)	(12,844)
Phu Soi Dao National Park	340 km^{2} (130 sq mi)	(26,811)
Phu Hin Rong Kla National Park	307 km^{2} (119 sq mi)	(223,790)
Khwae Noi National Park	198 km^{2} (76 sq mi)	(4,950)

=== Wildlife sanctuaries ===
There are six wildlife sanctuaries in region 11 (Phitsanulok), of which two are in Phitsanulok province.

Phu Miang–Phu Thong Wildlife Sanctuary	697 km^{2} (269 sq mi)
Phu Khat Wildlife Sanctuary	241 km^{2} (93 sq mi)

=== Location protected areas ===
Overview protected areas of Phitsanulok

Phitsanulok protected areas

	National park
1	Khwae Noi
2	Namtok Chat Trakan
3	Phu Hin Rong Kla
4	Phu Soi Dao
5	Thung Salaeng Luang

	Wildlife sanctuary
6	Phu Kat
7	Phu Miang-Phu Thong

== Religion ==
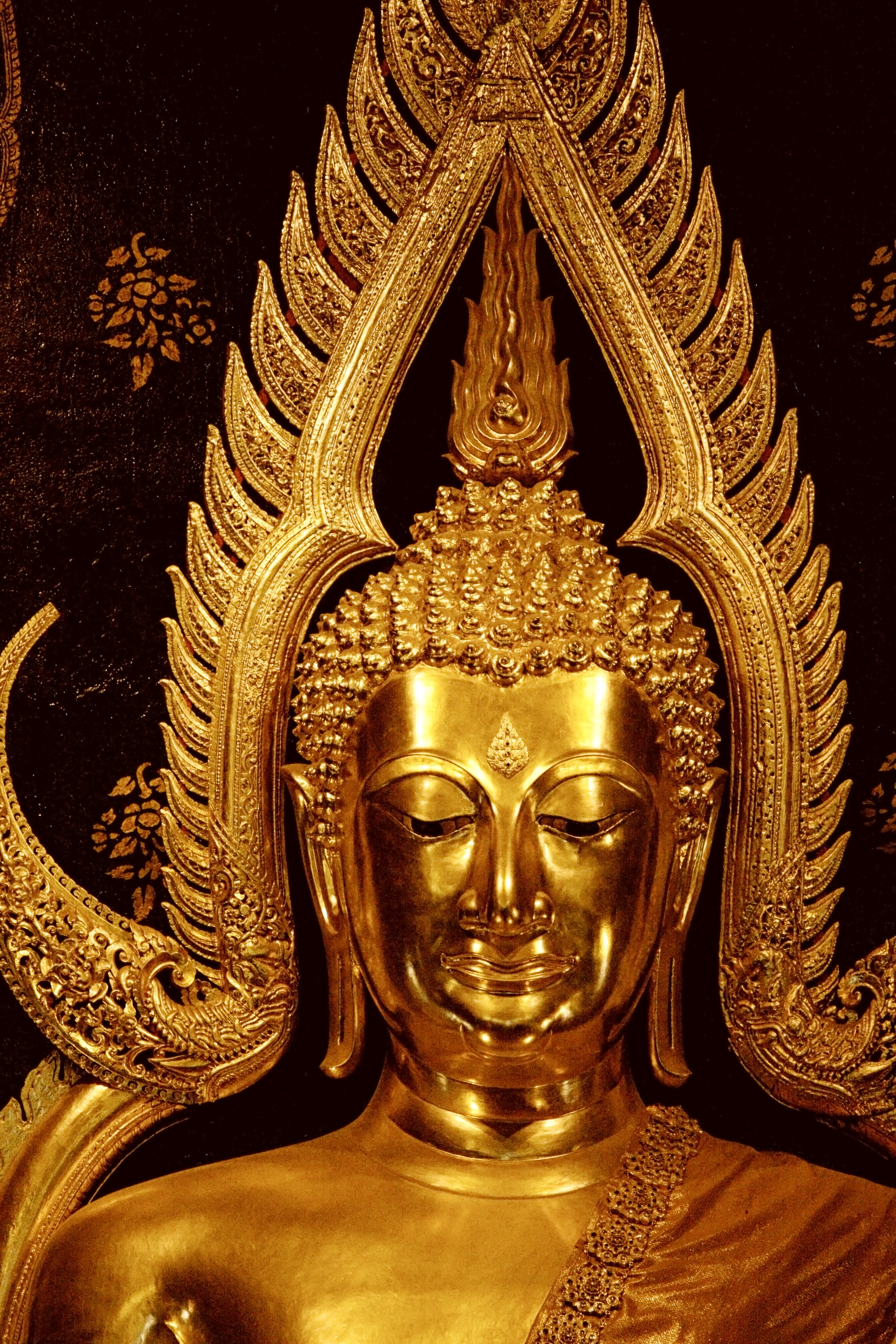
Phra Phuttha Chinnarat

=== Buddhism ===
As of 2019 the population of Phitsanulok was 95% Buddhist with some 328 Buddhist temples and 272 samnak song (houses of monks that are not officially registered) in the province.

• Mueang Phitsanulok District has 83 temples and 26 samnak song, a few of the 83 temples are:
• Wat Phra Si Rattana Mahathat (royal temple with Buddha Chinnarat)
• Wat Chulamani (oldest standing temple in Phitsanulok province)
• Wat Aranyik (historic temple)
• Wat Chan Tawan Tok (with 60 meter high sala under construction)

The other eight districts have the following numbers of temples and samnak song:

• Nakhon Thai district:	14 temples and 46 samnak song
• Chat Trakan district:	7 temples and 26 samnak song
• Bang Rakam district:	47 temples and 52 samnak song
• Bang Krathum district:	33 temples and 12 samnak song
• Phrom Phiram district:	56 temples and 16 samnak song
• Wat Bot district:	21 temples and 19 samnak song
• Wang Thong district:	50 temples and 43 samnak song
• Noen Maprang district:	17 temples and 32 samnak song

=== Christian ===
There are 50 Christian churches in Phitsanulok province.

• Mueang district:	11 churches
• Nakhon Thai district:	16 churches
• Chat Trakan district:	9 churches
• Bang Rakam district:	3 churches
• Bang Krathum:	1 church
• Phrom Phiram:	4 churches
• Wat Bot district:	1 church
• Wang Thong district:	2 churches
• Noen Maprang district:	3 churches

=== Muslim ===
Muslims have their Masjid Abubak Pakistan mosque in Mueang Phitsanulok district.

== Administrative divisions ==
Phitsanulok province is divided into nine districts (amphoe). These are further subdivided into 93 subdistricts (tambon) and 1050 villages (muban). As of 26 November 2019 for local government there are: one Phitsanulok Provincial Administrative Organisation - PPOA (ongkan borihan suan changwat phitsanulok) and 26 municipal (thesaban) areas in the province. Phitsanulok has city (thesaban nakhon) status, Aranyik has town (thesaban mueang) status and 24 subdistrict municipalities (thesaban tambon). The non-municipal areas are administered by 76 Subdistrict Administrative Organisations - SAO (ongkan borihan suan tambon).

Districts, Phitsanulok province	#	Name	Thai	Population	Tambon	Muban
	1	Mueang Phitsanulok	เมืองพิษณุโลก	291,311	20	173
	2	Nakhon Thai	นครไทย	87,772	11	147
	3	Chat Trakan	ชาติตระการ	41,346	6	72
	4	Bang Rakam	บางระกำ	94,643	11	142
	5	Bang Krathum	บางกระทุ่ม	47,359	9	87
	6	Phrom Phiram	พรหมพิราม	86,103	12	123
	7	Wat Bot	วัดโบสถ์	37,694	6	61
	8	Wang Thong	วังทอง	121,047	11	168
	9	Noen Maprang	เนินมะปราง	57,972	7	77

== Demography ==
=== Population ===
The population of Phitsanulok province is 865,247, of which Mueang Phitsanulok district is the most populated with 291,311 people. Wang Thong district also has a population exceeding 100,000 people. The remaining seven districts have populations of 35,000 to 95,000, of which Wat Bot district is the least populated district with 37,694 people.

Population 2019 census
	District	Population		Area			Population density	
	District	Data	Proportion	km^{2}	mile^{2}	Proportion	per km^{2}	per mile^{2}
1	Mueang	291,311	33.7%	750.8	289.9	7.0%	388	1,005
2	Wang Thong	121,047	14.0%	1,687.1	651.4	15.6%	72	186
3	Bang Rakam	94,643	10.9%	936.0	361.4	8.6%	101	262
4	Nakhon Thai	87,772	10.1%	2,220.4	857.3	20.5%	40	102
5	Phrom Phiram	86,103	10.0%	832.7	321.5	7.7%	103	268
6	Noen Maprang	57,972	6.7%	1,029.6	397.5	9.5%	56	146
7	Bang Krathum	47,359	5.5%	447.0	172.6	4.1%	106	274
8	Chat Trakan	41,346	4.8%	1,586.1	612.4	14.7%	26	68
9	Wat Bot	37,694	4.3%	1,326.2	512.0	12.3%	28	74
	Total	865,247	100.0%	10,815.9	4,176.0	100.0%	80	207

View source data.
View source data.

The population density of Phitsanulok province is 80 people per square kilometer (207 people per mile^{2}), of which Mueang Phitsanulok District has the highest density with 388 people per km^{2} (1,005 people per mile^{2}) and Chat Trakan District the lowest density with 26 people per km^{2} (68 people per mile^{2})

View source data.

=== Urban areas ===
The urban population of Phitsanulok province is 274,802 (31.8%). There is one urban area, the city of Phitsanulok, with more than 150,000 inhabitants. The urban area around Bang Rakam has more than 30,000 people. There are also seven urban areas with 7,000 to 13,000 people. There are six urban areas with fewer than 5,500 people, of which Phrom Phiram is the smallest with about 1,100 people.
See also: Phitsanulok Local Government

	Urban area	District	Municipality	People
1	Phitsanulok	Mueang	Phitsanulok city	66,106
		Mueang	Aranyik town	30,508
		Mueang	Hua Ro	24,902
		Mueang	Tha Thong	13,993
		Mueang	Ban Khlong	13,562
		Mueang	Phlai Chumphon	7,476
			Total	156,547
2	Bang Rakam	Bang Rakam	Bang Rakam M.M.	14,649
		Bang Rakam	Phan Sao	6,143
		Bang Rakam	Bueng Raman	4,390
		Bang Rakam	Bang Rakam	4,337
		Bang Rakam	Plak Raet	3,636
			Total	33,155
3	Noen Kum	Bang Krathum	Noen Kum	12,773

	Urban area	District	Municipality	People
4	Ban Yaeng	Nakhon Thai	Ban Yaeng	10,235
5	Nakhon Thai	Nakhon Thai	Nakhon Thai	9,278
6	Bang Krathum	Bang Krathum	Huai Kaeo	5,332
		Bang Krathum	Sanam Khli	2,496
		Bang Krathum	Bang Krathum	1,417
			Total	9,245
7	Sai Yoi	Noen Maprang	Sai Yoi	8,636
8	Wat Bot	Wat Bot	Wat Bot	8,078
9	Ban Mung	Noen Maprang	Ban Mung	7,003
10	Pa Daeng	Chat Trakan	Pa Daeng	5,408
11	Wang Thong	Wang Thong	Wang Thong	4,626
12	Noen Maprang	Noen Maprang	Noen Maprang	3,478
13	Wong Khong	Phrom Phiram	Wong Khong	3,210
14	Ban Mai	Mueang	Ban Mai	1,987
15	Phrom Phiram	Phrom Phiram	Phrom Phiram	1,143

=== Municipal/non-municipal areas ===
Of the total population of Phitsanulok province, 31.8% live in municipal areas. In Mueang Phitsanulok district, this is 54.4% of the people. Between 30% and 50% in three districts live in municipal areas. In two districts this is between 20–25%. Finally, it is less than 15% in three districts, with Wang Thong District having the lowest rate at 3.8%.

	District	Population	Municipal area		Non-municipal area	
	District	Population	Data	Proportion	Data	Proportion
1	Mueang	291,311	158,534	54.4%	132,777	45.6%
2	Bang Krathum	47,359	22,018	46.5%	25,341	53.5%
3	Bang Rakam	94,643	33,155	35.0%	61,488	65.0%
4	Noen Maprang	57,972	19,117	33.0%	38,855	67.0%
5	Nakhon Thai	87,772	19,513	22.2%	68,259	77.8%
6	Wat Bot	37,694	8,078	21.4%	29,616	78.6%
7	Chat Trakan	41,346	5,408	13.1%	35,938	86.9%
8	Phrom Phiram	86,103	4,353	5.1%	81,750	94.9%
9	Wang Thong	121,047	4,626	3.8%	116,421	96.2%
	Total	865,247	274,802	31.8%	590,445	68.2%

View source data.

=== Age structure ===
At the beginning of the 21st century there are lower birth rates. There are more men then women up to 40 years, suggesting that slightly more boys than girls born each year. Above 40 years of age there are more women then men, which reflects the higher life expectancy of women.

Age structure
Male	Years	Female	Subtotal
9,196	80+	14,088	23,284
7,542	75-79	10,241	17,783
12,018	70-74	14,939	26,957
18,386	65-69	22,239	40,625
23,900	60-64	27,261	51,161
30,716	55-59	34,752	65,468
32,509	50-54	36,404	68,913
32,215	45-49	34,476	66,691
32,044	40-44	32,936	64,980

Age structure
Male	Years	Female	Subtotal
31,457	35-39	30,861	62,318
28,620	30-34	27,816	56,436
30,515	25-29	28,804	59,319
33,380	20-24	30,330	63,710
25,966	15-19	26,930	52,896
24,569	10-14	23,189	47,758
23,435	5-9	22,127	45,562
19,555	0-4	18,550	38,105
423,304	Total	441,943	865,247

== Economy ==
=== Economic output ===
In 2018, Phitsanulok province had an economic output of 100.286 billion baht (US$3.235 billion). This amounts to per capita gross provincial product (GPP) of 111,872 baht (US$3,609). The total workforce was 476,004 of which 199,292 (41.9%) were employed in agriculture and fishing and 276,712 (58.1%) were employed in non-agriculture.

Gross provincial product (GPP)
	Activities	Baht	Percent
1	Agriculture	28,029,000,0000	28.0
2	Trade	13,897,000,000	13.9
3	Education	11,550,000,000	11.5
4	Defence + public admin.	9,978,000,000	10.0
5	Manufacturing	9,210,000,000	9.2
6	Financial	6,653,000,000	6.6
7	Construction	4,773,000,000	4.8
8	Real estate	4,224,000,000	4.2
9	Human health	4,068,000,000	4.0
10	Energy	2,261,000,000	2.3
11	Transportation	1,665,000,000	1.6
12	Hotel / restaurant	1,025,000,000	1.0
13	Informatica	749,000,000	0.7
14	Other service activities	692,000,000	0.7
15	Administration	623,000,000	0.6
16	Scientific activities	379,000,000	0.4
17	Pastime	339,000,000	0.3
18	Mining	171,000,000	0.2
	Total	100,286,000,000	100

Employed persons
	Activities	Workforce	Percent
1	Agriculture	199,292	41.9
2	Trade	62,685	13.2
3	Manufacturing	40,303	8.5
4	Construction	39,361	8.3
5	Hotel / restaurant	37,255	7.8
6	Defence + public admin.	24,918	5.2
7	Education	13,645	2.9
8	Other service activities	12,774	2.7
9	Human health	9,116	1.9
10	Transportation	7,783	1.6
11	Financial	5,895	1.3
12	Administration	5,805	1.2
13	Scientific activities	3,593	0.8
14	Energy	3,446	0.7
15	Pastime	3,289	0.7
16	Mining	2,659	0.6
17	Informatica	2,463	0.5
18	Real estate	1,722	0.4
	Total	476,004	100

View source data.
View source data.

=== Agriculture ===
Agricultural land use, 4,893 km^{2} (1,889 sq mi) is 45.2% of total land of Phitsanulok province 10,816 km^{2} (4,176 sq mi). This is divided as follows: paddy land: 2,846 km^{2} (1,099 sq mi) 58.2%, upland rice: 1,162 km^{2} (449 sq mi) 23.7%, orchard and perennial crop: 554 km^{2} (214 sq mi) 11.3%, vegetable and ornamental plant: 24 km^{2} (9.3 sq mi) 0.5% and farmland: 307 km^{2} (119 sq mi) 6.3%.

Agriculture in Phitsanulok province, the biggest sector of the economy, generated 28.029 billion baht (US$904 million) or 28% of GPP with a workforce of 199,292 (41.9% of all employed persons).

Production of the four main crops: sugarcane 1,620,173 tonnes; rice 1,284,164 tonnes; cassava 529,467 tonnes; and maize 255,898 tonnes.

Of the 54 sorts of vegetable crops, the twelve with the highest yield are: watermelon 6,452 tonnes; Chinese cabbage 3,671 tonnes; cabbage 2,332 tonnes; cucumber 1,495 tonnes; pumpkin 1,005 tonnes; bell pepper 983 tonnes; bird pepper 980 tonnes; ginger 892 tonnes; sweet corn 509 tonnes; bitter gourd 357 tonnes; lemon grass 283 tonnes and melon 236 tonnes.

Agricultural commodities produced in significant amounts include: pineapple 111,212 tonnes; para rubber 40,800 tonnes; mango 65,960 tonnes and banana (kluai numwa) 15,673 tonnes. Further there are: lime 2,147 tonnes; longan 1,436 tonnes; sweet banana 1,275 tonnes; tamarind 1,245 tonnes; pomelo 1,083 tonnes; rambutan 961 tonnes; sweet tamarind 900 tonnes; Indian mulberry 801 tonnes; marionberry 686 tonnes; plum mango 538 tonnes and jackfruit 340 tonnes.

=== Animal husbandry ===
Livestock produced included: cattle 48,100; chickens 2,809,362; ducks 642,182; swine 146,911; buffalo 16,022; goats 8,062; and geese 1,692.

=== Fisheries ===
Total catch from freshwater aquaculture was 12,169 tonnes: Wang Thong 3,650 tonnes; Bang Rakam 2,412 tonnes; Wat Bot 1,541 tonnes; Mueang Phitsanulok 1,144 tonnes; Nakhon Thai 1,007 tonnes; Phrom Phiram 990 tonnes; Noen Maprang 696 tonnes; Chat Trakan 566 tonnes; and Bang Krathum 159 tonnes.

=== Trade ===
Wholesale and retail trade; repair of motor vehicles and motorcycles, the second sector of the economy generated 13.897 billion baht (US$448 million) or 13.2% of GPP with a workforce of 62,685 (13.2%).

=== Hotels and restaurants ===
Hotels and restaurants contributed 1.025 billion baht (US$33 million) or one percent of GPP, with a workforce numbering 37,255 (7.8%).

== Education ==
Phitsanulok province is the educational center of the lower northern region. There are many educational institutions at all levels, from kindergarten to university level, both government and private.

=== Higher education ===
There are six higher education institutes in the province with 38,553 students:

- Naresuan University with 16 faculties, 184 courses and with more than 22,000 students is leader of the universities in Phitsanulok province
- Pibulsongkram Rajabhat University with 6 faculties
- Rajamangala University of Technology Lanna, campus Phitsanulok with 3 faculties
- Phitsanulok University, a private university with 5 faculties and 174 students
- Sirindhorn College of Public Health Phitsanulok province
- Boromarajonani College of Nursing Buddhachinaraj

=== Vocational education ===
- Total seven vocational colleges with 11,023 students

=== Secondary education ===
- Total 41 upper secondary schools with 15,982 students
- Total 164 lower secondary schools with 26,939 students

=== Primary education ===
- Total 256 primary schools with 52,508 students

== Healthcare ==
=== Government hospitals ===
There are thirteen government hospitals in Phitsanulok province with a total of 2,000 beds. Mueang Phitsanulok District has four hospitals:

- Buddhachinaraj Phitsanulok Hospital is the provincial's and city's primary public hospital with 1,000 beds.
- Naresuan University Hospital is the regional tertiary care hospital and a primary teaching hospital of Faculty of Medicine, Naresuan University.
- Fort Somdet Phra Naresuan Maharat Hospital is the army hospital, which is open to the general public.
- Royal Thai Air Force Wing 46 Hospital is the air force hospital, which is also open to the general public.

The other eight districts each have a hospital; Wang Thong District has two hospitals as an exception.

=== Private hospitals ===
Five private hospitals are in Mueang Phitsanulok district with 400 beds:

- Bangkok Hospital Phitsanulok
- Phitsanulok Hospital
- Pitsanuvej Hospital
- Ruamphaet Hospital
- Radiotherapy and Nuclear Medicine Hospital

=== Health promoting hospitals ===
There are total 147 health promoting hospitals:

- 24 in Mueang Phitsanulok district
- 20 in Nakhon Thai district
- 12 in Chat Trakan district
- 20 in Bang Rakam district
- 13 in Bang Krathum district
- 19 in Phrom Phiram district
- 9 in Wat Bot district
- 19 in Wang Thong district
- 11 in Noen Maprang district

=== Clinics ===
Around 412 clinics are in Phitsanulok province, of which 280 clinics (68%) in Mueang Phitsanulok district, 17 in Nakhon Thai, six in Chat Trakan, 17 in Bang Rakam, 12 in Bang Krathum, 29 in Phrom Phiram, 13 in Wat Bot, 25 in Wang Thong and 13 in Noen Maprang Districts.

== Transport ==
=== Roads ===
There are five major roads in the province.

- Highway 11 to the north: Phitsanulok–Uttaradit–Lampang
- Highway 12 to the east: Phitsanulok–Phetchabun–Khon Kaen–Mukdahan
- Highway 11 to the south:Phitsanulok–Sing Buri
- Highway 117 to the south: Phitsanulok–Phichit–Nakhon Sawan
- Highway 12 to the west: Phitsanulok–Sukhothai–Tak–Mae Sot

They are all connected by Phitsanulok outer ring road 126 with viaducts.

East–West Economic Corridor (EWEC) is a transportation link along Myanmar–Thailand–Laos–Vietnam:
Mawlamyine (Moulmein)–Myawaddy/Mae Sot–Phitsanulok–Khon Kaen–Mukdahan/Savannakhet–Dong Ha–Da Nang.

=== Motor vehicles ===
==== Autocars and motorcycles ====
Registered in 2019 under the "Motor Car Act":

Autocars	Numbers
Sedan	93,742
Van & pick-up	62,037
Microbus & passenger van	2,467
Urban taxi	173
Total	158,419

Motorcycles	Numbers
Motorcycle	180,944
Public motorcycle	181
Motortricycle taxi (tuk tuk)	93
Motortricycle	6
Total	181,224

==== Buses and trucks ====
Registered in 2019 under the "Land Transport Act":

Buses	Numbers
Non-fixed route bus	372
Fixed route bus	273
Private bus	19
Total	664

Trucks	Numbers
Private truck	8,179
Non-fixed route truck	1,872
Total	10,051

Buses provide the mass transport throughout the province. Phitsanulok is connected from three bus terminals with Bangkok and the cities of the provinces of northern Thailand (except Mae Hong Son) and upper northeastern Thailand by daily and nightly, direct bus routes. All of these bus routes are provided by eight bus companies:

- Sombat Tour
- Phet Prasert
- Esan Tour
- Wintour
- Kingdom Tour
- Nakhonchai Air
- Yanyon Tour
- Budsarakam Tour

Phet Prasert operates also direct bus lines to eastern Thailand (Pattaya and Chantaburi).
Direct bus lines to southern Thailand (Phuket, Ko Samui, Phang Nga, Hat Yai and Surat Thani) are provided by Piya Chai Patthana.

=== Airlines ===
Phitsanulok airport in 2019 handles 689,392 passengers, 5,661 flights and 150,980 kilograms (332,850 lb) of cargo.

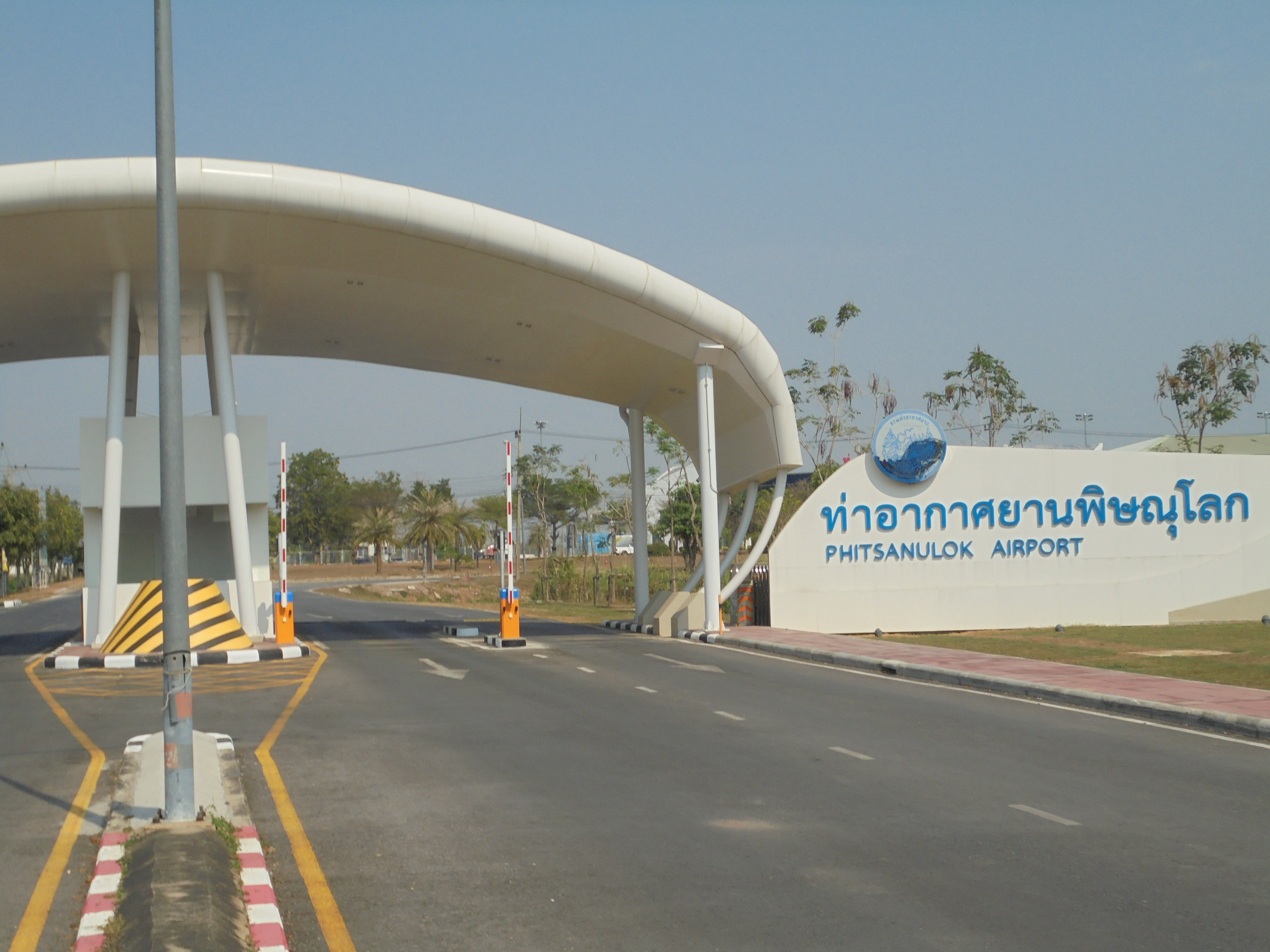
Phitsanulok Airport gate

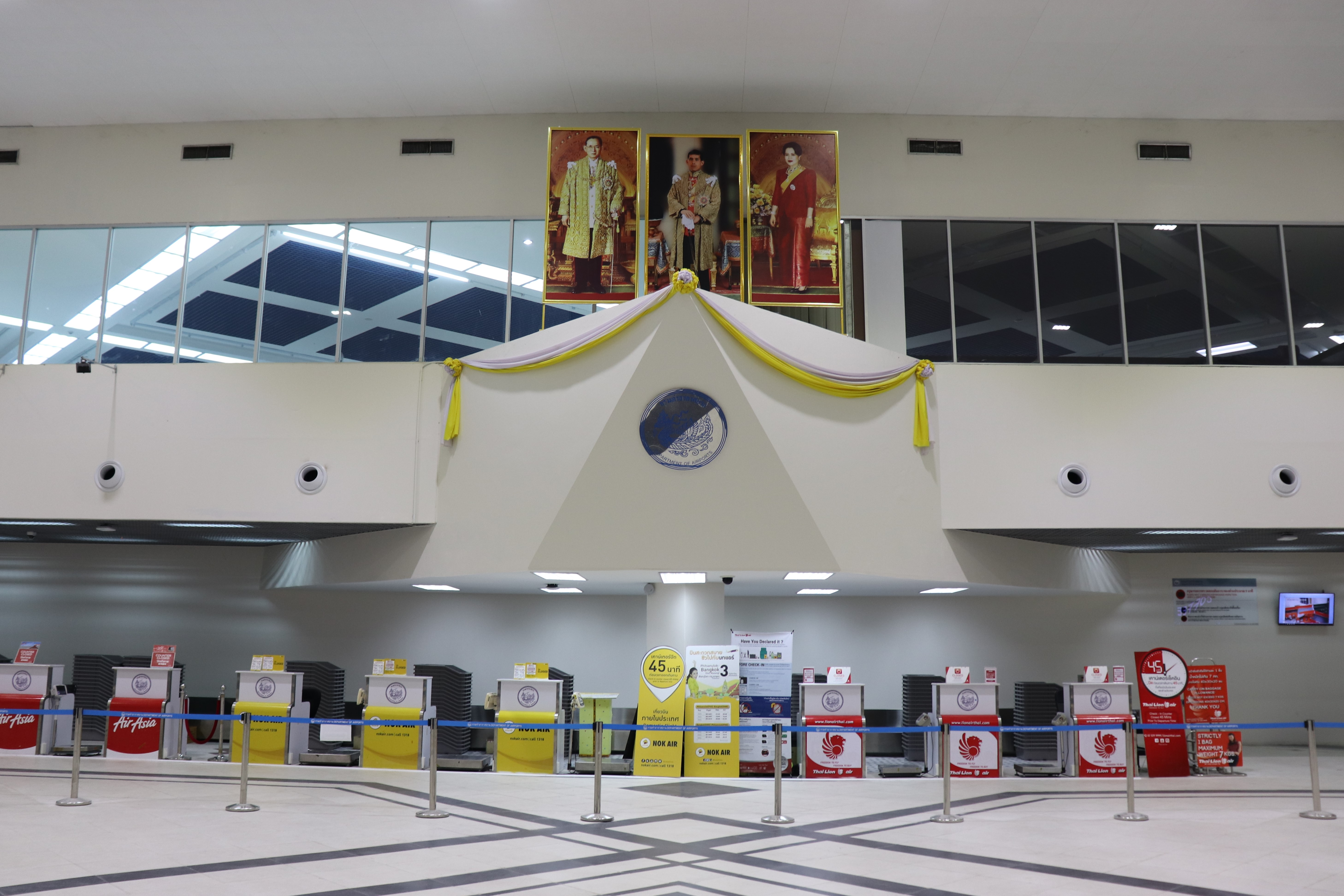
Check-in Phitsanulok airport

Phitsanulok air transport
Year	Aircraft movements	Passengers	Freight (kgs)
2019	5,661	689,392	150,980
2018	5,314	672,084	143,595
2017	5,398	600,093	457,237
2016	4,079	492,117	1,096,365
2015	5,076	549,951	944,013
2014	5,243	475,587	254,702

Airlines	Destinations
Nok Air	Bangkok–Don Mueang
Thai Air Asia	Bangkok–Don Mueang
Thai Lion Air	Bangkok–Don Mueang

=== Railway ===
==== Public rail transport ====
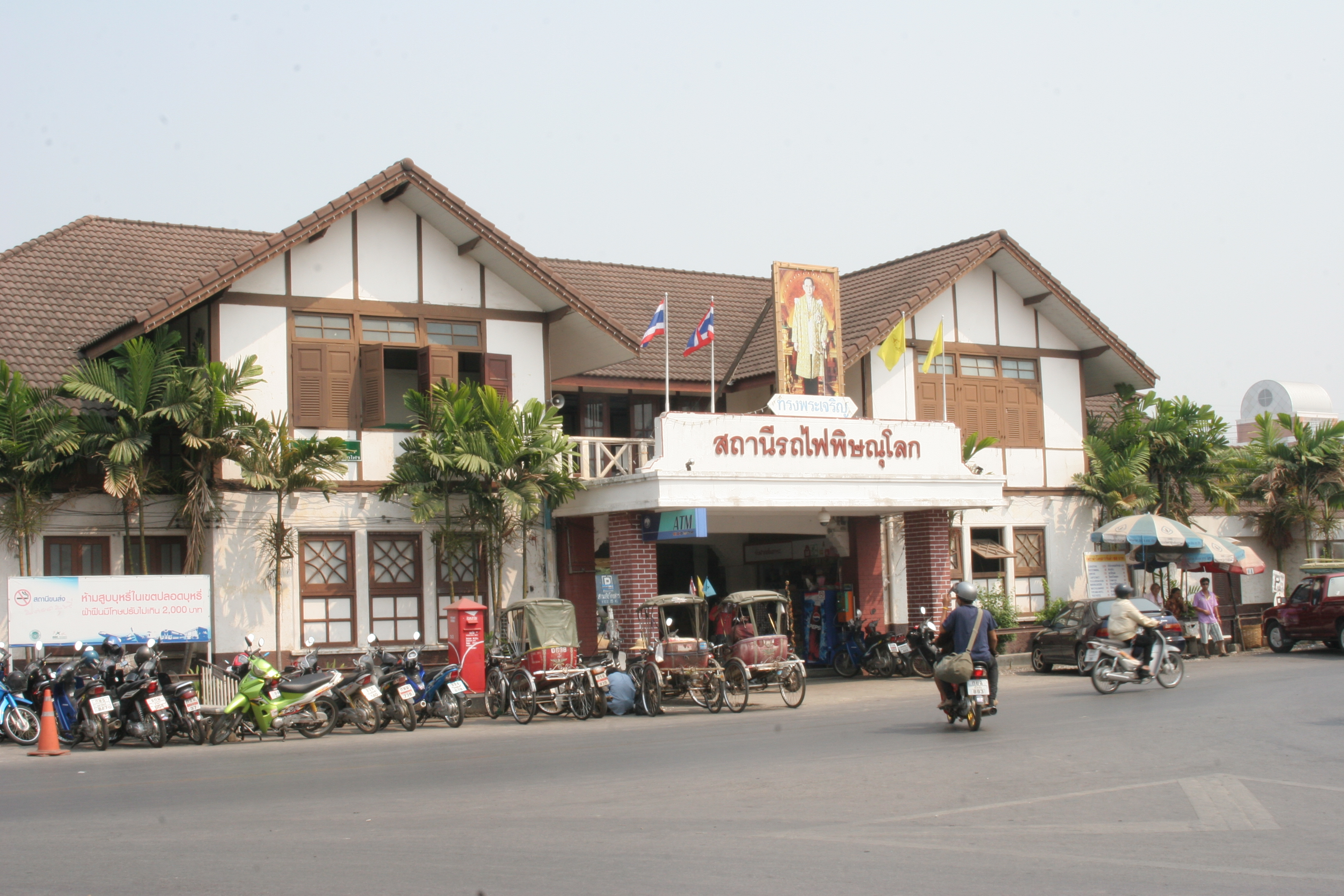
Phitsanulok railway station

Phitsanulok city has Phitsanulok railway station on the Northern Line of the State Railway of Thailand.
Intercity service runs from Hua Lamphong railway station of Bangkok - Ayutthaya - Nakhon Sawan - Phitsanulok - Lampang - Chiang Mai.
Commuter rail runs along the Northern Line.
In the year 2019, all tickets sold were 528,819.
204 first class one way tickets were sold.
Second class tickets were also sold for one way for a total of 85,374 (16.1%).
Third class tickets sold totaled 443,445 (83.9%).
One way third class tickets totaled 393,958 (74.5%).
Roundtrip third class tickets totaled 9,389 (1.8%).
Commuter third class tickets totaled 40,098 (7.6%).

Railway station	District of Phitsanulok	Subtotal	Second class	Third class			
Railway station	District of Phitsanulok	tickets	One way	One way	Roundtrip	Commuter	Subtotal
Ban Bung	Phrom Phiram	7,305		3,944	144	3,217	7,305
Nong Tom	Phrom Phiram	36,336	5,532	27,228	199	3,377	30,804
Phrom Phiram	Phrom Phiram	19,208	955	15,107	76	3,070	18,253
Khwae Noi	Mueang	2,462		1,652	313	497	2,462
Ban Tum	Mueang	282		246	36		282
Ban Teng Nam	Mueang	7,303		5,657	80	1,566	7,303
Phitsanulok	Mueang	395,840	77,155	292,338	5,602	20,745	318,685
Bueng Phra	Mueang	2,016		1,954	38	24	2,016
Ban Mai	Mueang	13,356	144	10,292	920	2,000	13,212
Mae Thiap	Bang Krathum	4,490		3,091	264	1,135	4,490
Bang Krathum	Bang Krathum	40,221	1,588	32,449	1,717	4,467	38,633
Total	All tickets	528,819	85,374	393,958	9,389	40,098	443,445

==== Freight rail transport ====
Quantity goods carried (tons)
Station	District	Subtotal	Carload	Package
Nong Tom	Phrom Phiram	42.48		42.48
Phrom Phiram	Phrom Phiram	24.28		24.28
Phitsanulok	Mueang	869.18	406.00	463.18
Bueng Phra	Mueang	866,931.10	866,931.10	
Ban Mai	Mueang	13.23		13.23
Mae Thiap	Bang Krathum	0.84		0.84
Bang Krathum	Bang Krathum	124.18		124.18
Total	Freight	868,005.29	867,337.10	668.19

A small portion of all freight in Phitsanulok province is transported by rail.

PTT Public Company Limited operates a crude oil depot adjacent to Bueng Phra railway station. SRT runs several oil freight services from this railway station to Mae Nam railway station in Chong Nonsi Subdistrict, Yan Nawa District, Bangkok.

== Tourism ==
There were 6,403 hotel rooms in 2018; about 3,304,883 people of which 3,088,811 Thai (93.5%) and 216,072 foreigners (6.5%) visited Phitsanulok province and contributed 8.33 billion baht (US$268 million) to tourism revenues. Further explained: 1,999,391 tourists of which 1,838,692 Thai and 216,072 foreigners; 1,305,492 excursionists of which 1,205,119 Thai and 55,373 foreigners. Compared to the two previous years 2016 and 2017, the number of people increased by 6.3 and 5.4% respectively.

== Infrastructure ==
=== Communications ===
As of 2018 there were 304,425 households, of which 6,726 (2.2%) used fixed telephones, 66,149 (21.7%) used computers without internet connection and 209,090 (68.7) used computers with internet connection.
As of 2018 there were 835,814 people aged six years and older, of which 227,325 (27.2%) used computers, 454,569 (54.4%) used the internet and 744,576 (89.1%) used mobile phones.

=== Electricity ===
In 2019, of the 347,266 households in Phitsanulok province 85.7% were connected to the electricity grid. All households of Bang Krathum District were connected, but for Noen Maprang District this was 69.9%.

View source data.

=== Waterworks ===
Provincial Waterworks Authority (PWA) supplied tap water to 63,077 households of Phitsanulok province or 18.5%.

Mueang Phitsanulok District has 42,267 households (30.5%) connected to the water grid. Noen Maprang District has 526 households (2.4%) connected to the water grid. Almost every residential area has its own water tower connected to a drilled water source.

== Human achievement index 2022 ==
Health	Education	Employment	Income
57	36	51	21
Housing	Family	Transport	Participation
25	75	57	57
Province Phitsanulok, with an HAI 2022 value of 0.6190 is "low", occupies place 67 in the ranking.

Since 2003, United Nations Development Programme (UNDP) in Thailand has tracked progress on human development at sub-national level using the Human achievement index (HAI), a composite index covering all the eight key areas of human development. National Economic and Social Development Board (NESDB) has taken over this task since 2017.

Rank	Classification
1 - 13	"high"
14 - 29	"somewhat high"
30 - 45	"average"
46 - 61	"somewhat low"
62 - 77	"low"

Map with provinces and HAI 2022 rankings

== See also ==
- Thai–Laotian Border War
