= Ban Mai railway station =

Railway station

Coordinates: 16.6896°N 100.2730°E

Ban Mai บ้านใหม่

General information
- Location: Mu 1 (Ban Mai), Wat Phrik Subdistrict, Phitsanulok City
- Owner: State Railway of Thailand
- Line: Northern Line
- Platforms: 1
- Tracks: 3

Other information
- Station code: บห.

History
- Opened: 24 January 1908; 118 years ago

Services
Preceding station	State Railway of Thailand	Following station
Mae Thiap towards Hua Lamphong or Krung Thep Aphiwat	Northern Line	Bueng Phra towards Chiang Mai
Location

Ban Mai railway station is a railway station located in Wat Phrik Subdistrict, Phitsanulok City, Phitsanulok. It is located 375.313 km from Bangkok railway station and is a class 3 railway station. It is on the Northern Line of the State Railway of Thailand. The station opened on 24 January 1908 as part of the Northern Line extension from Pak Nam Pho to Phitsanulok.

On the evening of 10 July 2020, ordinary train no. 201 bound for Phitsanulok derailed in the station yard. There were no injuries.
