= Hua Dong railway station =

Railway station in Phichit, Thailand

Coordinates: 16.3393°N 100.4030°E

Hua Dong หัวดง
- Station in 2026

General information
- Location: Mu 1 (Ban Hua Dong), Hua Dong Subdistrict, Phichit City
- Owner: State Railway of Thailand
- Line: Northern Line
- Platforms: 1
- Tracks: 3

Other information
- Station code: หด.

History
- Opened: 24 January 1908; 118 years ago

Services
Preceding station	State Railway of Thailand	Following station
Huai Ket towards Hua Lamphong or Krung Thep Aphiwat	Northern Line	Wang Krot towards Chiang Mai
Location

Hua Dong railway station is a railway station located in Hua Dong Subdistrict, Phichit City, Phichit. It is located 332.605 km from Bangkok railway station and is a class 2 railway station. It is on the Northern Line of the State Railway of Thailand. The station opened on 24 January 1908 as part of the Northern Line extension from Pak Nam Pho to Phitsanulok.

== Gallery ==
Station building
