= Wang Krot railway station =

Railway station in Thailand

Coordinates: 16.3990°N 100.3894°E

Wang Krot วังกรด
- Station in 2026

General information
- Location: Mu 1 (Ban Wang Krot), Ban Bung Subdistrict, Phichit City
- Owner: State Railway of Thailand
- Line: Northern Line
- Platforms: 1
- Tracks: 2

Other information
- Station code: วร.

History
- Opened: 24 January 1908; 118 years ago

Services
Preceding station	State Railway of Thailand	Following station
Hua Dong towards Hua Lamphong or Krung Thep Aphiwat	Northern Line	Phichit towards Chiang Mai
Location

Wang Krot railway station is a railway station located in Ban Bung Subdistrict, Phichit City, Phichit. It is located 339.363 km from Bangkok railway station and is a class 2 railway station. It is on the Northern Line of the State Railway of Thailand. The station opened on 24 January 1908 as part of the Northern Line extension from Pak Nam Pho to Phitsanulok.

== Gallery ==
Station building
