= Nong Tom railway station =

Railway station in Thailand

Coordinates: 17.1006°N 100.1631°E

Nong Tom หนองตม
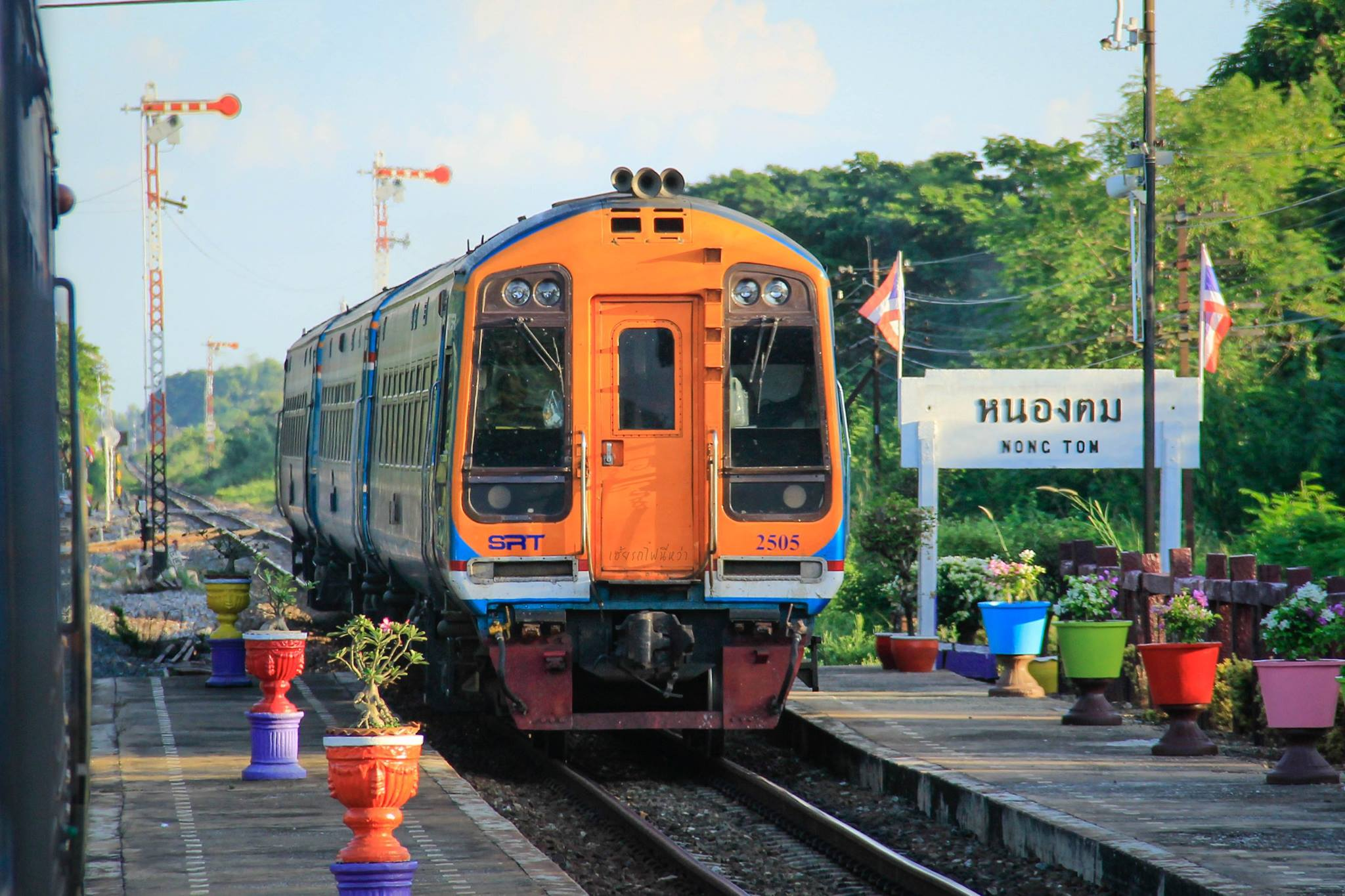

General information
- Location: Mu 1 (Ban Nong Tom), Wong Khong Subdistrict, Phrom Phiram District, Phitsanulok
- Owner: State Railway of Thailand
- Line: Northern Line
- Platforms: 2
- Tracks: 3

Other information
- Station code: หต.

History
- Opened: 11 November 1908; 117 years ago

Services
Preceding station	State Railway of Thailand	Following station
Phrom Phiram towards Hua Lamphong or Krung Thep Aphiwat	Northern Line	Ban Bung towards Chiang Mai
Location

Nong Tom railway station is a railway station located in Wong Khong Subdistrict, Phrom Phiram District, Phitsanulok. It is located 423.203 km from Bangkok railway station and is a class 2 railway station. It is on the Northern Line of the State Railway of Thailand. Nong Tom Railway Station opened in November 1908 as part of the Northern Line extension from Phitsanulok to Ban Dara Junction.
