= Phrom Phiram railway station =

Railway station in Thailand

Coordinates: 17.0311°N 100.2010°E

Phrom Phiram พรหมพิราม

General information
- Location: Phrom Phiram Subdistrict, Phrom Phiram District, Phitsanulok
- Owner: State Railway of Thailand
- Line: Northern Line
- Platforms: 1
- Tracks: 3

Other information
- Station code: พห.

History
- Opened: 11 November 1908; 117 years ago
- Former names: Ban Krab Phuang

Services
Preceding station	State Railway of Thailand	Following station
Khwae Noi towards Hua Lamphong or Krung Thep Aphiwat	Northern Line	Nong Tom towards Chiang Mai
Location

Phrom Phiram railway station is a railway station located in Phrom Phiram Subdistrict, Phrom Phiram District, Phitsanulok. It is located 414.507 km from Bangkok railway station and is a class 2 railway station. It is on the Northern Line of the State Railway of Thailand. Phrom Phiram railway station opened in November 1908 as part of the Northern Line extension from Phitsanulok to Ban Dara Junction.
