= Dong Takhop railway station =

Railway station in Thailand

Coordinates: 16.1387°N 100.4147°E

Dong Takhop ดงตะขบ
- Station in 2026

General information
- Location: Mu 3 (Ban Sathani Dong Takhop), Bang Phai Subdistrict, Bang Mun Nak District, Phichit
- Owner: State Railway of Thailand
- Line: Northern Line
- Platforms: 1
- Tracks: 3

Other information
- Station code: ดข.

Services
Preceding station	State Railway of Thailand	Following station
Ho Krai towards Hua Lamphong or Krung Thep Aphiwat	Northern Line	Taphan Hin towards Chiang Mai
Location

Dong Takhop railway station is a railway station located in Bang Phai Subdistrict, Bang Mun Nak District, Phichit. It is located 309.878 km from Bangkok railway station and is a class 3 railway station. It is on the Northern Line of the State Railway of Thailand.

== Gallery ==
Station building
