= Ho Krai railway station =

Railway station in Thailand

Coordinates: 16.0830°N 100.4059°E

Ho Krai หอไกร
- Station in 2026

General information
- Location: Mu 4 (Ban Ho Krai), Ho Krai Subdistrict, Bang Mun Nak District, Phichit
- Owner: State Railway of Thailand
- Line: Northern Line
- Platforms: 1
- Tracks: 2

Other information
- Station code: ไก.

Services
Preceding station	State Railway of Thailand	Following station
Bang Mun Nak towards Hua Lamphong or Krung Thep Aphiwat	Northern Line	Dong Takhop towards Chiang Mai
Location

Ho Krai railway station is a railway station located in Ho Krai Subdistrict, Bang Mun Nak District, Phichit. It is located 303.500 km from Bangkok railway station and is a class 3 railway station. It is on the Northern Line of the State Railway of Thailand.

== Gallery ==
Station building
