= Noen Makok railway station =

Railway station in Noen Makok, Thailand

Coordinates: 15.4757°N 100.1729°E

Noen Makok เนินมะกอก
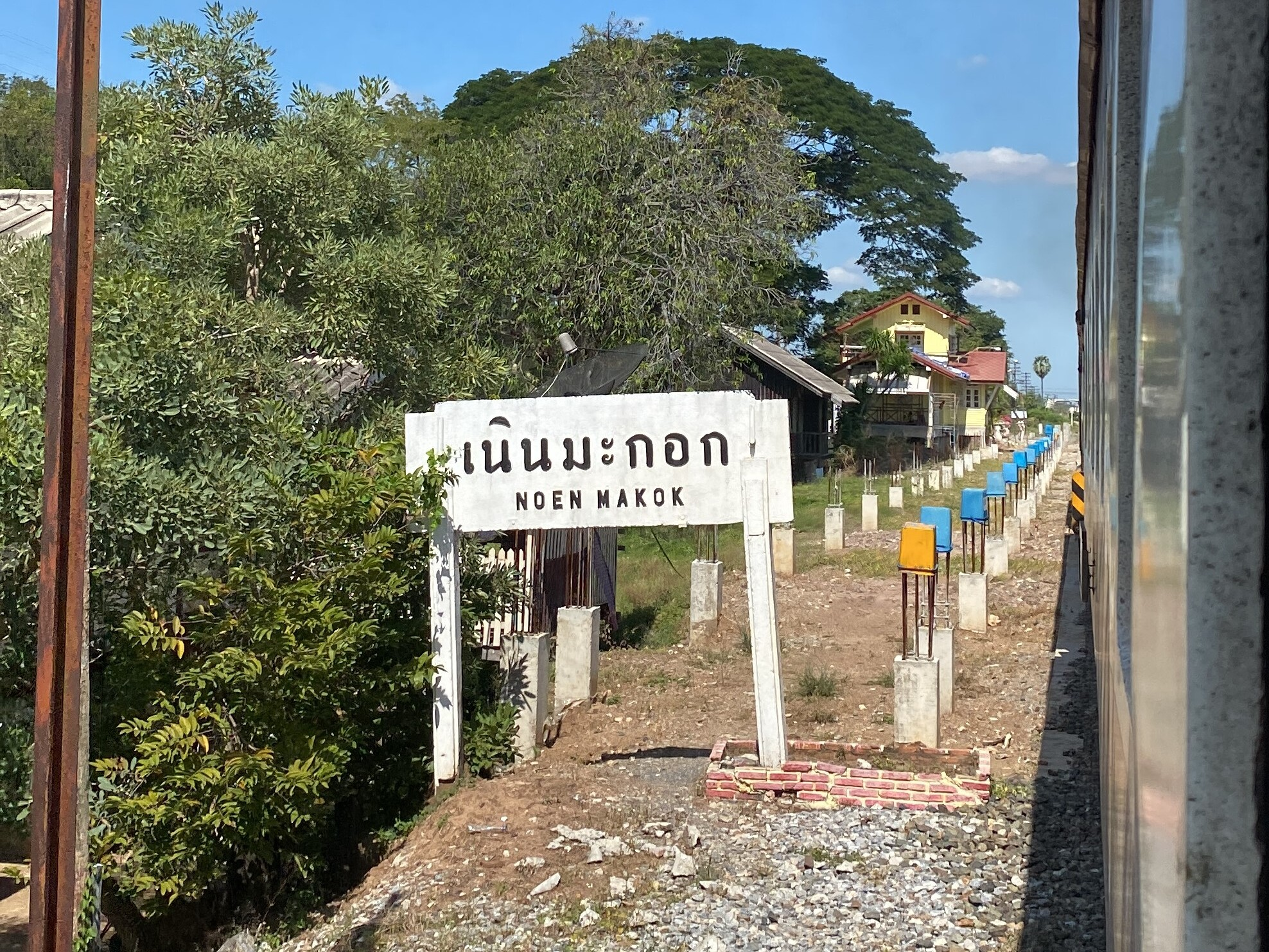
- The station in 2022

General information
- Location: Mu 10 (Ban Makok Nuea), Noen Makok Subdistrict, Phayuha Khiri District, Nakhon Sawan
- Owner: State Railway of Thailand
- Line: Northern Line
- Platforms: 1
- Tracks: 3

Other information
- Station code: มก.

History
- Opened: 31 October 1905

Services
Preceding station	State Railway of Thailand	Following station
Hua Ngiu towards Hua Lamphong or Krung Thep Aphiwat	Northern Line	Khao Thong towards Chiang Mai
Location

Noen Makok railway station is a railway station located in Noen Makok Subdistrict, Phayuha Khiri District, Nakhon Sawan. It is located 224.816 km from Bangkok railway station and is a class 3 railway station. It is on the Northern Line of the State Railway of Thailand. The station opened on 31 October 1905 as part of the Northern Line extension from Lop Buri to Pak Nam Pho.
