= Hua Ngiu railway station =

Railway station in Noen Makok, Thailand

Coordinates: 15.4271°N 100.2196°E

Hua Ngiu หัวงิ้ว

General information
- Location: Mu 9 (Ban Hua Ngiu), Noen Makok Subdistrict, Phayuha Khiri District, Nakhon Sawan
- Owner: State Railway of Thailand
- Line: Northern Line
- Platforms: 1
- Tracks: 2

Other information
- Station code: หง.

Services
Preceding station	State Railway of Thailand	Following station
Nong Pho towards Hua Lamphong or Krung Thep Aphiwat	Northern Line	Noen Makok towards Chiang Mai
Location

Hua Ngiu railway station is a railway station located in Noen Makok Subdistrict, Phayuha Khiri District, Nakhon Sawan. It is located 217.224 km (134.977 mi) from Bangkok railway station and is a class 3 railway station. It is on the Northern Line of the State Railway of Thailand.
