= Bueng Phra railway station =

Railway station in Thailand

Coordinates: 16.7490°N 100.2639°E

Bueng Phra บึงพระ

General information
- Location: Bueng Phra Subdistrict, Phitsanulok City
- Owner: State Railway of Thailand
- Line: Northern Line
- Platforms: 1
- Tracks: 4

Other information
- Station code: บะ.

History
- Opened: 24 January 1908; 118 years ago

Services
Preceding station	State Railway of Thailand	Following station
Ban Mai towards Hua Lamphong or Krung Thep Aphiwat	Northern Line	Phitsanulok towards Chiang Mai
Location

Bueng Phra railway station is a railway station located in Bueng Phra Subdistrict, Phitsanulok City, Phitsanulok. It is located 381.875 km from Bangkok railway station and is a class 1 railway station. It is on the Northern Line of the State Railway of Thailand. The station opened on 24 January 1908 as part of the Northern Line extension from Pak Nam Pho to Phitsanulok. PTT Public Company Limited operates a crude oil depot adjacent to the site and the railway operates several oil freight services from this station (to Mae Nam Station).
