= Wang Krang railway station =

Railway station in Thailand

Coordinates: 15.9769°N 100.3477°E

Wang Krang วังกร่าง
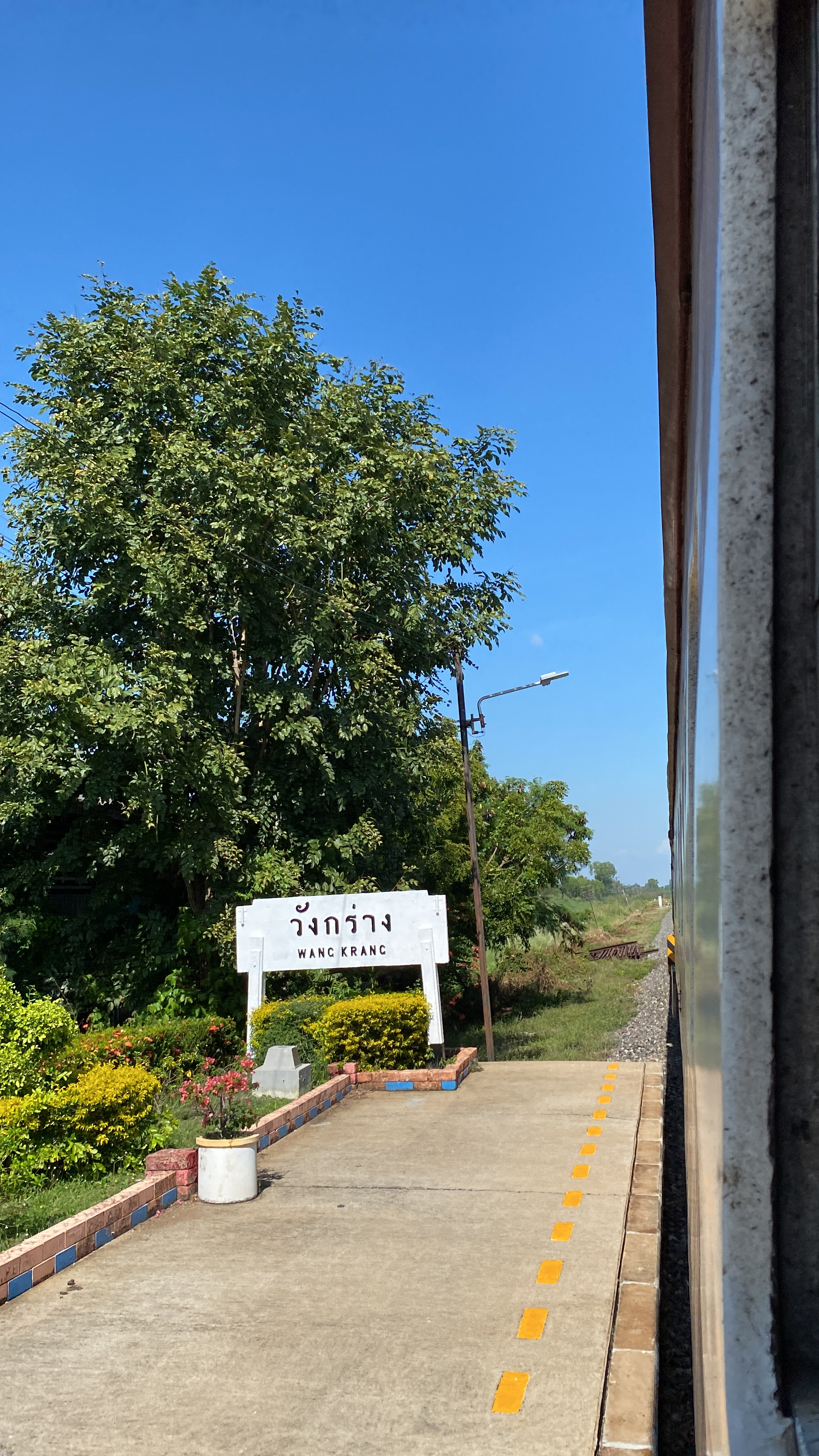
- Station sign

General information
- Location: Noen Makok Subdistrict, Bang Mun Nak District, Phichit
- Owner: State Railway of Thailand
- Line: Northern Line
- Platforms: 1
- Tracks: 2

Other information
- Station code: กา.

Services
Preceding station	State Railway of Thailand	Following station
Chumsaeng towards Hua Lamphong or Krung Thep Aphiwat	Northern Line	Bang Mun Nak towards Chiang Mai
Location

Wang Krang railway station is a railway station located in Noen Makok Subdistrict, Bang Mun Nak District, Phichit. Named after the sound of rail cars being coupled together, it is located 290.243 km from Bangkok railway station and is a class 3 railway station. It is on the Northern Line of the State Railway of Thailand.
