= Ban Bung railway station =

Railway station in Thailand

Coordinates: 17.1691°N 100.1095°E

Ban Bung บ้านบุ่ง

General information
- Location: Mu 5 (Ban Bung), Si Phirom Subdistrict, Phrom Phiram District, Phitsanulok
- Owner: State Railway of Thailand
- Line: Northern Line
- Platforms: 1
- Tracks: 2

Other information
- Station code: บง.

Services
Preceding station	State Railway of Thailand	Following station
Nong Tom towards Hua Lamphong or Krung Thep Aphiwat	Northern Line	Ban Khon towards Chiang Mai
Location

Ban Bung railway station is a railway station located in Si Phirom Subdistrict, Phrom Phiram District, Phitsanulok. It is located 432.750 km from Bangkok railway station and is a class 3 railway station. It is on the Northern Line of the State Railway of Thailand.
