= Nong Pho railway station =

Railway station in Thailand

Coordinates: 15.3936°N 100.2593°E

Nong Pho หนองโพ

General information
- Location: Mu 1 (Ban Nong Pho), Nong Pho Subdistrict, Takhli District, Nakhon Sawan
- Owner: State Railway of Thailand
- Line: Northern Line
- Platforms: 1
- Tracks: 3

Other information
- Station code: นพ.

History
- Opened: 31 October 1905; 120 years ago

Services
| Preceding station | State Railway of Thailand | Following station |
|---|---|---|
| Hua Wai towards Hua Lamphong or Krung Thep Aphiwat | Northern Line | Hua Ngiu towards Chiang Mai |
Location

Nong Pho railway station is a railway station located in Nong Pho Subdistrict, Takhli District, Nakhon Sawan. It is located 211.444 km from Bangkok railway station and is a class 3 railway station. It is on the Northern Line of the State Railway of Thailand. The station opened on 31 October 1905 as part of the Northern Line extension from Lop Buri to Pak Nam Pho.
