= Nong Wua Thao railway station =

Railway station in Phra Bat, Thailand

Coordinates: 18.2442°N 99.5005°E

Nong Wua Thao หนองวัวเฒ่า
- Station in 2026

General information
- Location: Phra Bat Subdistrict, Lampang City
- Owner: State Railway of Thailand
- Line: Northern Line
- Platforms: 1
- Tracks: 2

Other information
- Station code: วถ.

Services
Preceding station	State Railway of Thailand	Following station
Mae Tha towards Hua Lamphong or Krung Thep Aphiwat	Northern Line	Nakhon Lampang towards Chiang Mai
Location

Nong Wua Thao railway station is a railway station located in Phra Bat Subdistrict, Lampang City, Lampang. It is located 637.414 km from Bangkok railway station and is a class 3 railway station.

== Gallery ==
Station building
