= Mae Tha railway station =

Railway station in Thailand

Coordinates: 18.1998°N 99.5568°E

Mae Tha แม่ทะ
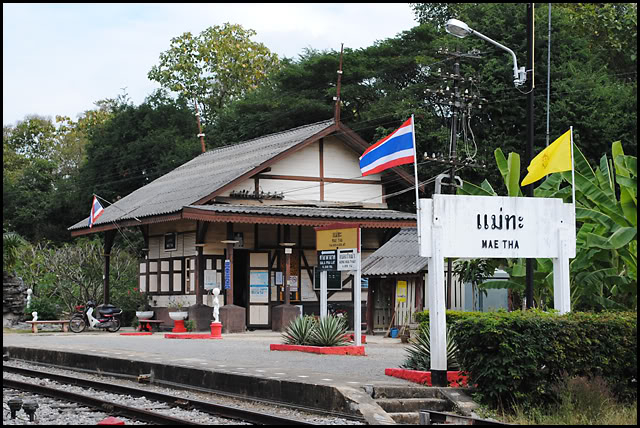

General information
- Location: Mae Tha Subdistrict, Mae Tha District, Lampang
- Owner: State Railway of Thailand
- Line: Northern Line
- Platforms: 1
- Tracks: 2

Other information
- Station code: มท.

Services
Preceding station	State Railway of Thailand	Following station
Sala Pha Lat towards Hua Lamphong or Krung Thep Aphiwat	Northern Line	Nong Wua Thao towards Chiang Mai
Location

Mae Tha railway station is a railway station located in Mae Tha Subdistrict, Mae Tha District, Lampang. It is located 628.445 km from Bangkok railway station and is a class 2 railway station. The station building is on the passing loop.

== Gallery ==
Station platform

Station building
