= Khwae Noi railway station =

Railway station in Makham Sung, Thailand

Coordinates: 16.9536°N 100.2323°E

Khwae Noi แควน้อย

General information
- Location: Mu 10 (Ban Khwae Noi), Makham Sung Subdistrict, Phitsanulok City
- Owner: State Railway of Thailand
- Line: Northern Line
- Platforms: 1
- Tracks: 2

Other information
- Station code: คน.

Services
| Preceding station | State Railway of Thailand | Following station |
|---|---|---|
| Ban Tum towards Hua Lamphong or Krung Thep Aphiwat | Northern Line | Phrom Phiram towards Chiang Mai |
Location

Khwae Noi railway station is a railway station located in Makham Sung Subdistrict, Phitsanulok City, Phitsanulok. It is located 405.313 km from Bangkok railway station and is a class 3 railway station. It is on the Northern Line of the State Railway of Thailand. About 500 m north of the railway station is a railway bridge once bombed by Allied planes during the Second World War. A monument to the bombing exists at the station.
