= Ban Teng Nam railway station =

Railway station in Thailand

Coordinates: 16.8555°N 100.2665°E

Ban Teng Nam บ้านเต็งหนาม

General information
- Location: Mu 6 (Ban Teng Nam), Hua Ro Subdistrict, Phitsanulok City
- Owner: State Railway of Thailand
- Line: Northern Line
- Platforms: 1
- Tracks: 2

Other information
- Station code: เห.

Services
Preceding station	State Railway of Thailand	Following station
Phitsanulok towards Hua Lamphong or Krung Thep Aphiwat	Northern Line	Ban Tum towards Chiang Mai
Location

Ban Teng Nam railway station is a railway station located in Hua Ro Subdistrict, Phitsanulok City, Phitsanulok. It is located 393.759 km from Bangkok railway station and is a class 3 railway station. It is on the Northern Line of the State Railway of Thailand.
