= Khao Thong railway station =

Railway station in Thailand

Coordinates: 15.5720°N 100.1764°E

Khao Thong เขาทอง
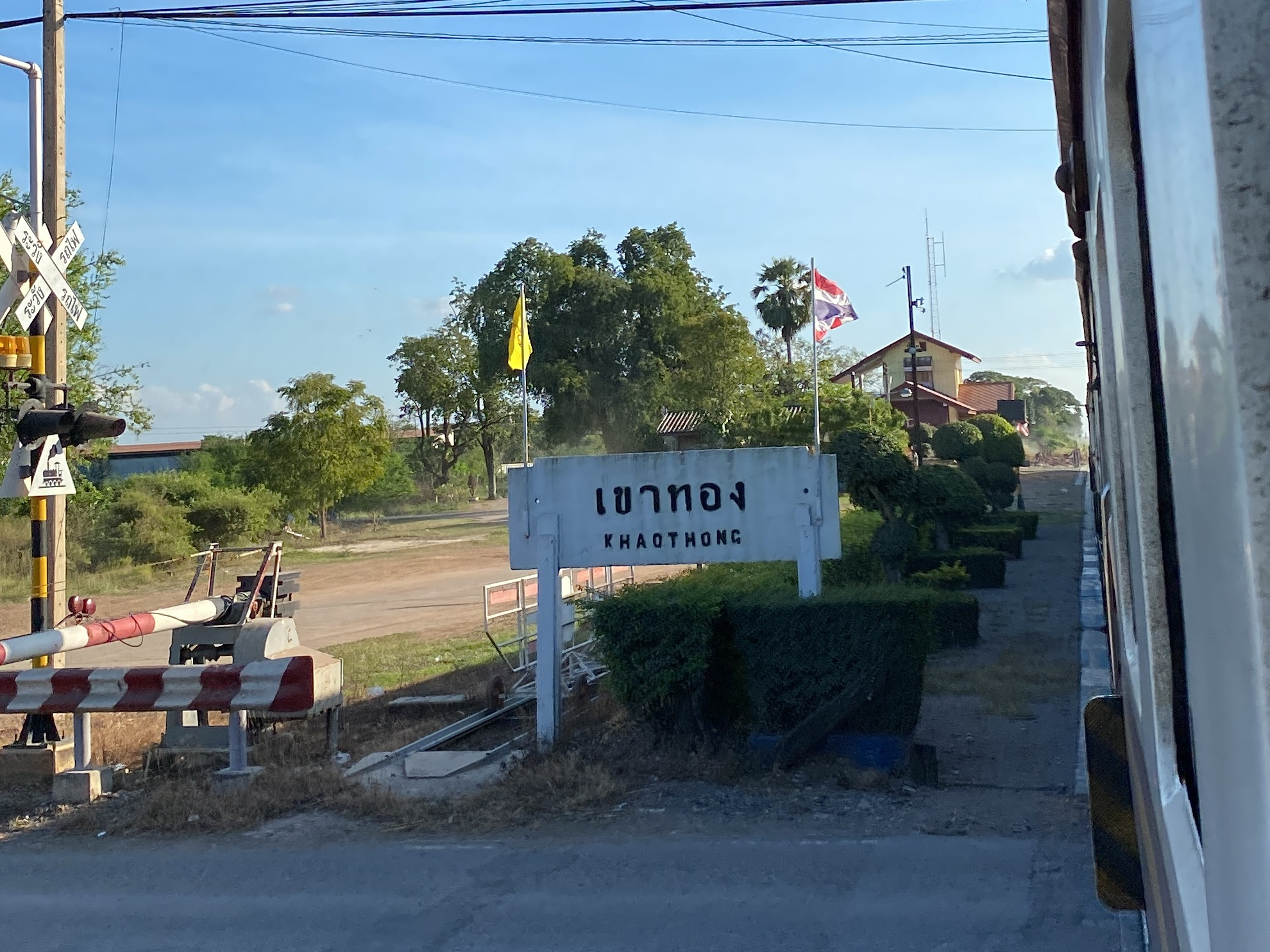
- The station in 2022

General information
- Location: Ban Khao Thong, Khao Thong Subdistrict, Phayuha Khiri District, Nakhon Sawan
- Owner: State Railway of Thailand
- Line: Northern Line
- Platforms: 1
- Tracks: 3

Other information
- Station code: ขท.

History
- Opened: 31 October 1905

Services
Preceding station	State Railway of Thailand	Following station
Noen Makok towards Hua Lamphong or Krung Thep Aphiwat	Northern Line	Nakhon Sawan towards Chiang Mai
Location

Khao Thong railway station is a railway station located in Khao Thong Subdistrict, Phayuha Khiri District, Nakhon Sawan. It is located 235.493 km from Bangkok railway station and is a class 3 railway station. It is on the Northern Line of the State Railway of Thailand. The station opened on 31 October 1905 as part of the Northern Line extension from Lop Buri to Pak Nam Pho.
