= Sala Pha Lat railway station =

Railway station in Thailand

Coordinates: 18.2387°N 99.5960°E

Sala Pha Lat ศาลาผาลาด
- Station in 2026

General information
- Location: Ban Pha Lat, Mae Tha Subdistrict, Mae Tha District, Lampang
- Owner: State Railway of Thailand
- Line: Northern Line
- Platforms: 1
- Tracks: 2

Other information
- Station code: ผล.

Services
Preceding station	State Railway of Thailand	Following station
Huai Rak Mai Halt towards Hua Lamphong or Krung Thep Aphiwat	Northern Line	Mae Tha towards Chiang Mai
Location

Sala Pha Lat railway station is a railway station located in Mae Tha Subdistrict, Mae Tha District, Lampang. It is located 622.209 km from Bangkok railway station and is a class 3 railway station.

== Gallery ==
Station building
