= Ban Tum railway station =

Railway station in Thailand

Coordinates: 16.9090°N 100.2504°E

Ban Tum บ้านตูม

General information
- Location: Mu 2 (Ban Tum), Pak Thok Subdistrict, Phitsanulok City
- Owner: State Railway of Thailand
- Line: Northern Line
- Platforms: 1
- Tracks: 2

Other information
- Station code: ตม.

Services
| Preceding station | State Railway of Thailand | Following station |
|---|---|---|
| Ban Teng Nam towards Hua Lamphong or Krung Thep Aphiwat | Northern Line | Khwae Noi towards Chiang Mai |
Location

Ban Tum railway station is a railway station located in Pak Thok Subdistrict, Phitsanulok City, Phitsanulok. It is located 400.005 km from Bangkok railway station and is a class 3 railway station. It is on the Northern Line of the State Railway of Thailand.
