= Mae Thiap railway station =

Railway station in Phitsanulok, Thailand

Coordinates: 16.6097°N 100.2841°E

Mae Thiap แม่เทียบ

General information
- Location: Mu 1 (Ban Mae Thiap), Bang Krathum Subdistrict, Bang Krathum District, Phitsanulok
- Owner: State Railway of Thailand
- Line: Northern Line
- Platforms: 1
- Tracks: 3

Other information
- Station code: แท.

Services
Preceding station	State Railway of Thailand	Following station
Bang Krathum towards Hua Lamphong or Krung Thep Aphiwat	Northern Line	Ban Mai towards Chiang Mai
Location

Mae Thiap is a railway station located in Bang Krathum Subdistrict, Bang Krathum District, Phitsanulok, Thailand. It is located 366.213 km from Bangkok railway station and is a class 3 railway station. It is on the Northern Line of the State Railway of Thailand.
