= Huai Ket railway station =

Railway station in Thailand

Huai Ket ห้วยเกตุ
- Station in 2026

General information
- Location: Ngiu Rai Subdistrict, Taphan Hin District, Phichit; Thailand
- Coordinates: 16.2733°N 100.4253°E
- Owner: State Railway of Thailand
- Line: Northern Line
- Platforms: 1
- Tracks: 2

Other information
- Station code: ยต.

Services
Preceding station	State Railway of Thailand	Following station
Taphan Hin towards Hua Lamphong or Krung Thep Aphiwat	Northern Line	Hua Dong towards Chiang Mai
Location

Huai Ket railway station is a railway station located in Ngiu Rai Subdistrict, Taphan Hin District, Phichit, Thailand. It is located 324.915 km from Bangkok railway station and is a class 3 railway station. It is on the Northern Line of the State Railway of Thailand.

== Gallery ==
Station building
