= Phitsanulok railway station =

Railway station in Thailand

Coordinates: 16°48′54″N 100°15′56″E

Phitsanulok พิษณุโลก
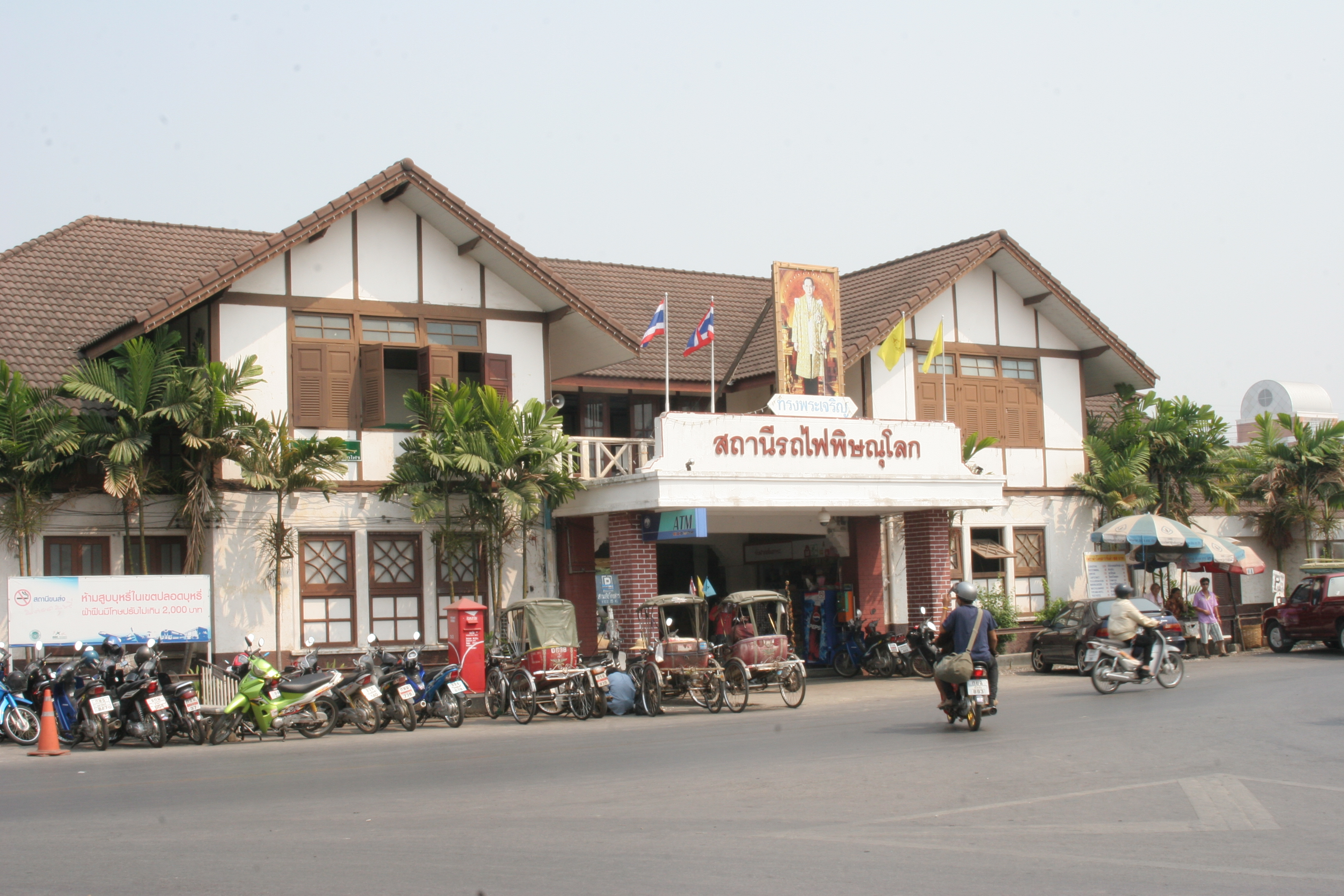

General information
- Location: Rotfai Road, Nai Muang Subdistrict, Phitsanulok City
- Owner: State Railway of Thailand
- Line: Northern Line
- Platforms: 3
- Tracks: 7

Construction
- Parking: yes

Other information
- Station code: พล.

Services
Preceding station	State Railway of Thailand	Following station
Bueng Phra towards Hua Lamphong or Krung Thep Aphiwat	Northern Line	Ban Teng Nam towards Chiang Mai
Location

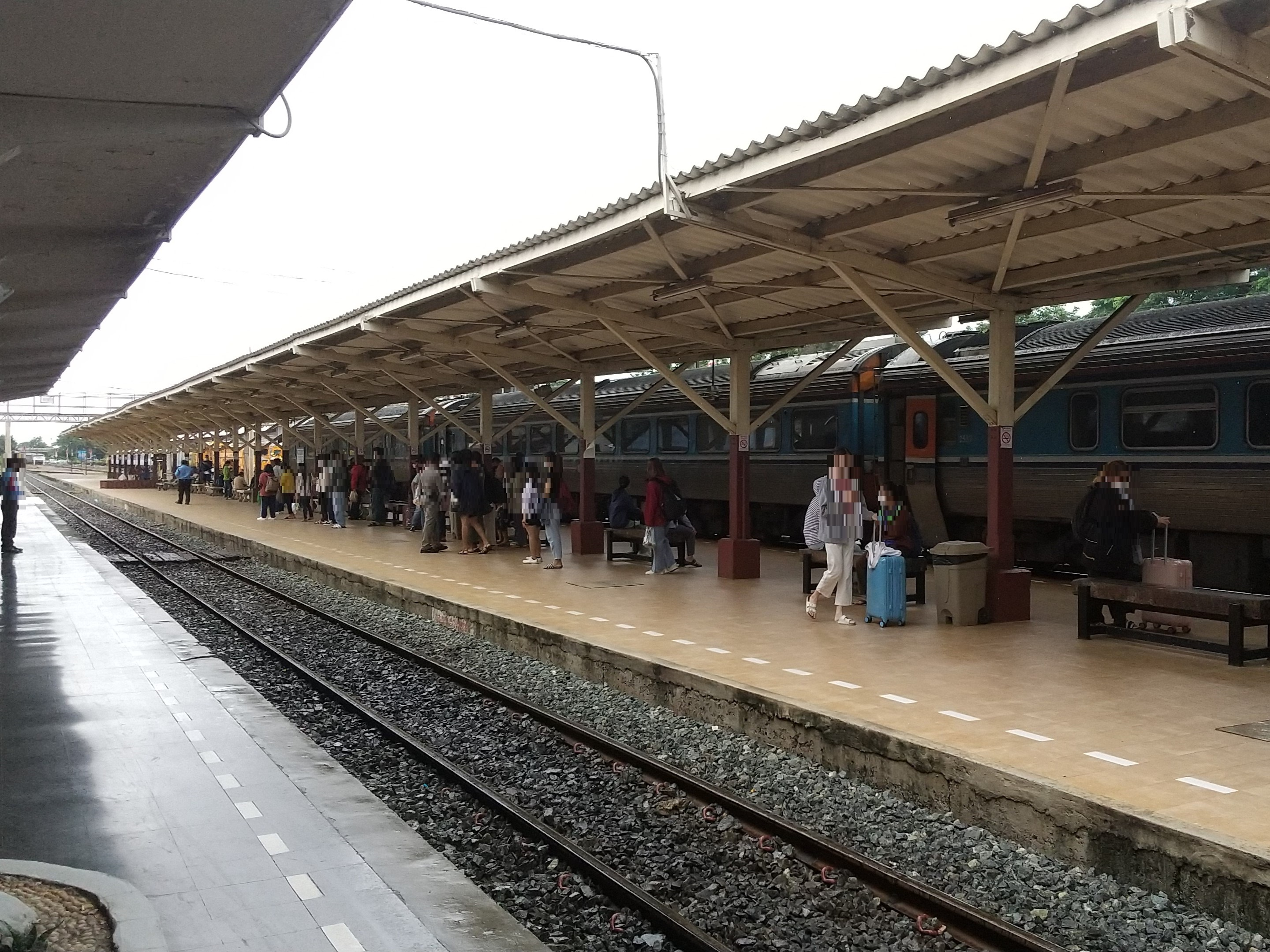
Platforms

Phitsanulok railway station is a railway station in Phitsanulok and it is the main station for the province. It is owned by the State Railway of Thailand and is on the Northern Line. Phitsanulok railway station is 389.291 kilometres (241.9 mi) from Bangkok railway station. This is the last station that uses lighted signal posts and marks the start of the section with the use of semaphore signals.

== Future ==
Phitsanulok is planned stop on the high-speed rail link connecting Bangkok to Chiang Mai. The station location has not been decided. There are two choices: at the current railway station or another site near Phitsanulok Airport.
