= Mae Phuak railway halt =

Railway halt in Thailand

Coordinates: 17.936050°N 100.057624°E

Mae Phuak แม่พวก
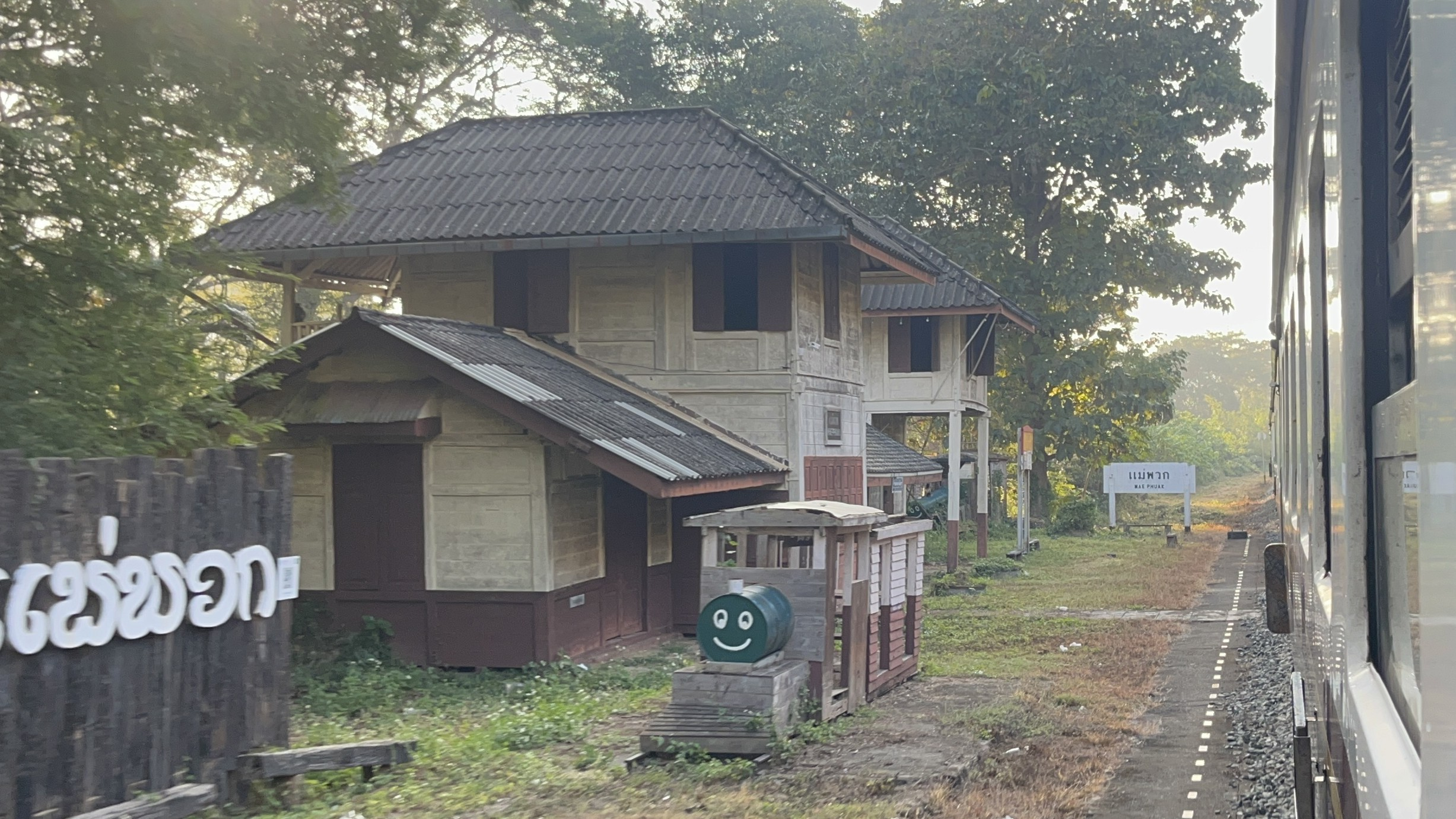
- Former station building in 2026

General information
- Location: Ban Mae Phuak, Huai Rai Subdistrict, Den Chai District, Phrae 54110
- Owner: State Railway of Thailand (SRT)
- Operator: State Railway of Thailand (SRT)
- Line: Northern Line (Thailand)
- Platforms: 1
- Tracks: 1

Other information
- Station code: มพ.

History
- Opened: 1919

Services
Preceding station	State Railway of Thailand	Following station
Rai Kled Dao Halt towards Hua Lamphong or Krung Thep Aphiwat	Northern Line	Den Chai towards Chiang Mai
Location

Mae Phuak railway halt (Thai: ที่หยุดรถแม่พวก; no.code 1162) is a railway halt in Ban Mae Phuak, Huai Rai Subdistrict, Den Chai District, Phrae Province, northern Thailand. It is located about 30 kilometres (19 mi) from Phrae town and 528.22 kilometres (328.22 mi) from Bangkok railway station (Hua Lamphong railway station).

== History ==
In 1903, Ban Mae Phuak was part of Mueang Phrae District, subsequently, it was upgraded to a Mae Phuak District. Later in the year 1917, the government changed the name of Mae Phuak District to Sung Men District and Ban Mae Phuak was merged with Den Chai District since 1887.

Mae Phuak railway halt was originally a railway station which opened in 1919. The station building has beautiful architecture in the era of King Rama V. It is one of the oldest railway stations in Thailand, over 100 years old. It is a two-storey wooden building, divided into office building and station master's accommodation, and office building and assistant station master's accommodation separated by a passenger shelter.

In 2003 it was downgraded to a railway halt due to lower passenger numbers. SRT can't bear the expenses that come up to 100,000 baht per month, while earning only a few tens of baht.

Later, a local leader gathered residents to rebuild the station. They started by initiate a Pha-Pa fundraising project to find a budget to repaint, and then installed electricity. Including receiving budget support from the government about 2,000,000 baht. At present, the entrance to the station has been developed into a landmark and also the recreation ground. The interior of the building has been transformed into a local museum displaying daily appliances and old photographs depicting local history.

The railway halt station building received the ASA Architectural Conservation Award in 2016 from the Association of Siamese Architects.

In addition, the area of more than 133 rai (about 52.5 acres) opposite the halt is also the first and the largest teak plantation site in northern region.
