= Den Chai railway station =

Railway station in Thailand

Coordinates: 17.9803°N 100.0464°E

Den Chai เด่นชัย
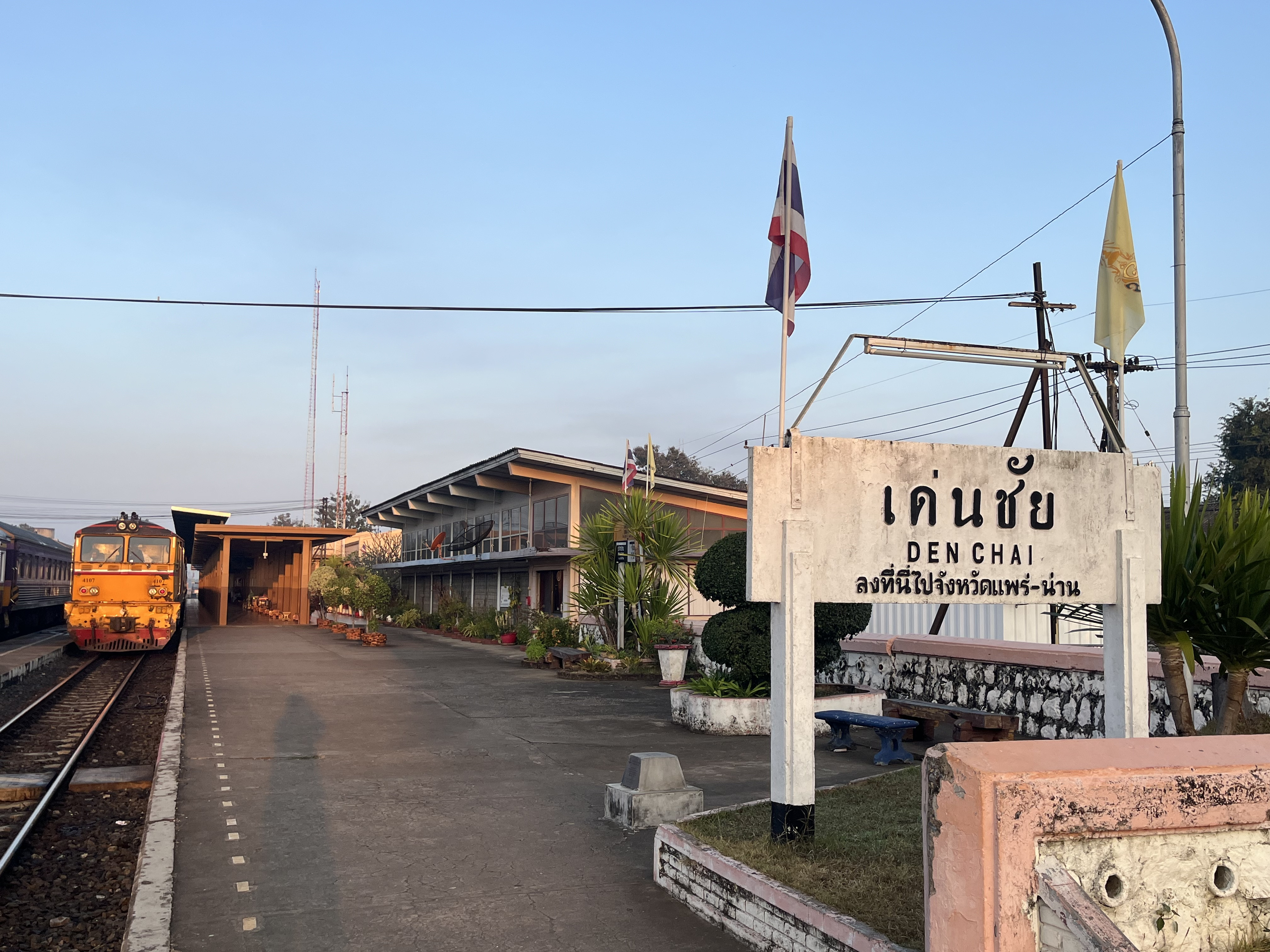
- Station in 2026

General information
- Location: Den Chai Subdistrict, Den Chai District, Phrae 54110
- Owner: State Railway of Thailand
- Operator: State Railway of Thailand
- Line: Northern Line (Thailand)
- Platforms: 3
- Tracks: 6

Construction
- Accessible: yes

Other information
- Station code: ดช.

Services
Preceding station	State Railway of Thailand	Following station
Mae Phuak Halt towards Hua Lamphong or Krung Thep Aphiwat	Northern Line	Pak Pan towards Chiang Mai
Location

Den Chai station (Thai: สถานีเด่นชัย) is a railway station located in Den Chai Subdistrict, Den Chai District, Phrae. It is a Class 1 railway station and is the main station for Phrae Province, as there is no rail service to Phrae City. It is located about 530 kilometres (330 mi) from Bangkok railway station. It is also the station to alight for passengers heading to Nan Province.

== History ==
Den Chai Station was opened in 1912 during the King Rama VI's reign as Phrae provincial railway station. In the olden days, the station was once used as a hub for various types of commodities, for example the shipping of wood, heavy products, as well as loads of packages would be conveyed here, also it was a distribution centre to provinces in the immediate vicinity. During that time, the station master had more powers than the district chief.

The exact station building was renovated around 1957. The building constructed with the entire wooden structures, including ancient teak wood, was adjusted and extended to provide a larger usable area. It is transformed into a cemented building with structures like butterfly roofing and a spacious with lengthy platform to accommodate the utilities.

A new 323-kilometer-long branch line, branching off from Den Chai station to the Lao border at Chiang Khong, is under construction and is expected to open in 2028.

== Gallery ==
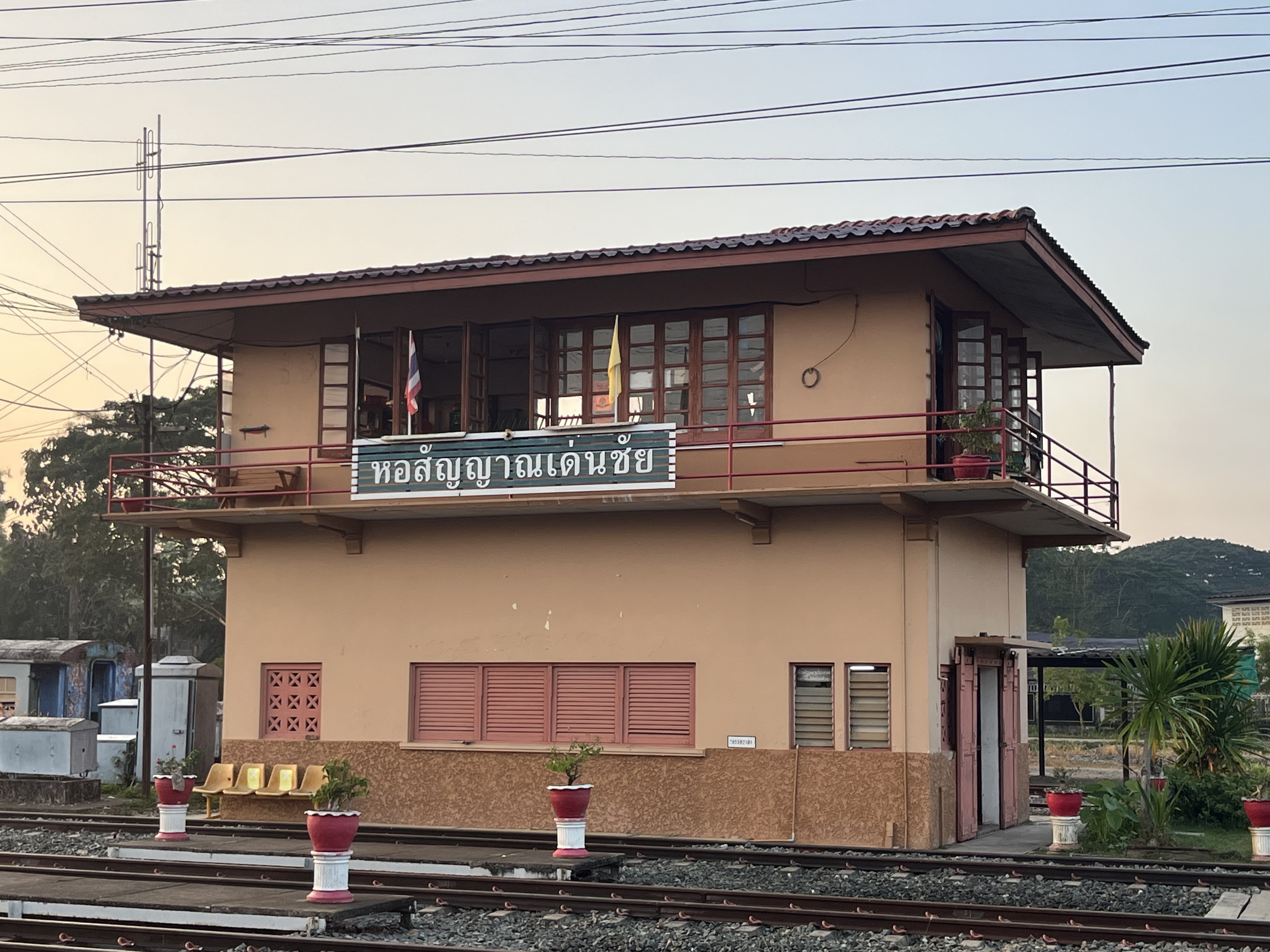
Den Chai signalbox
