= Phrae (disambiguation) =

Phrae can refer to:

- the town Phrae
- the Phrae Province
- Amphoe Mueang Phrae, the district around Phrae town
