= Cho Hae =

Tambon of Phrae Province, Thailand

Coordinates: 18.086206°N 100.203956°E

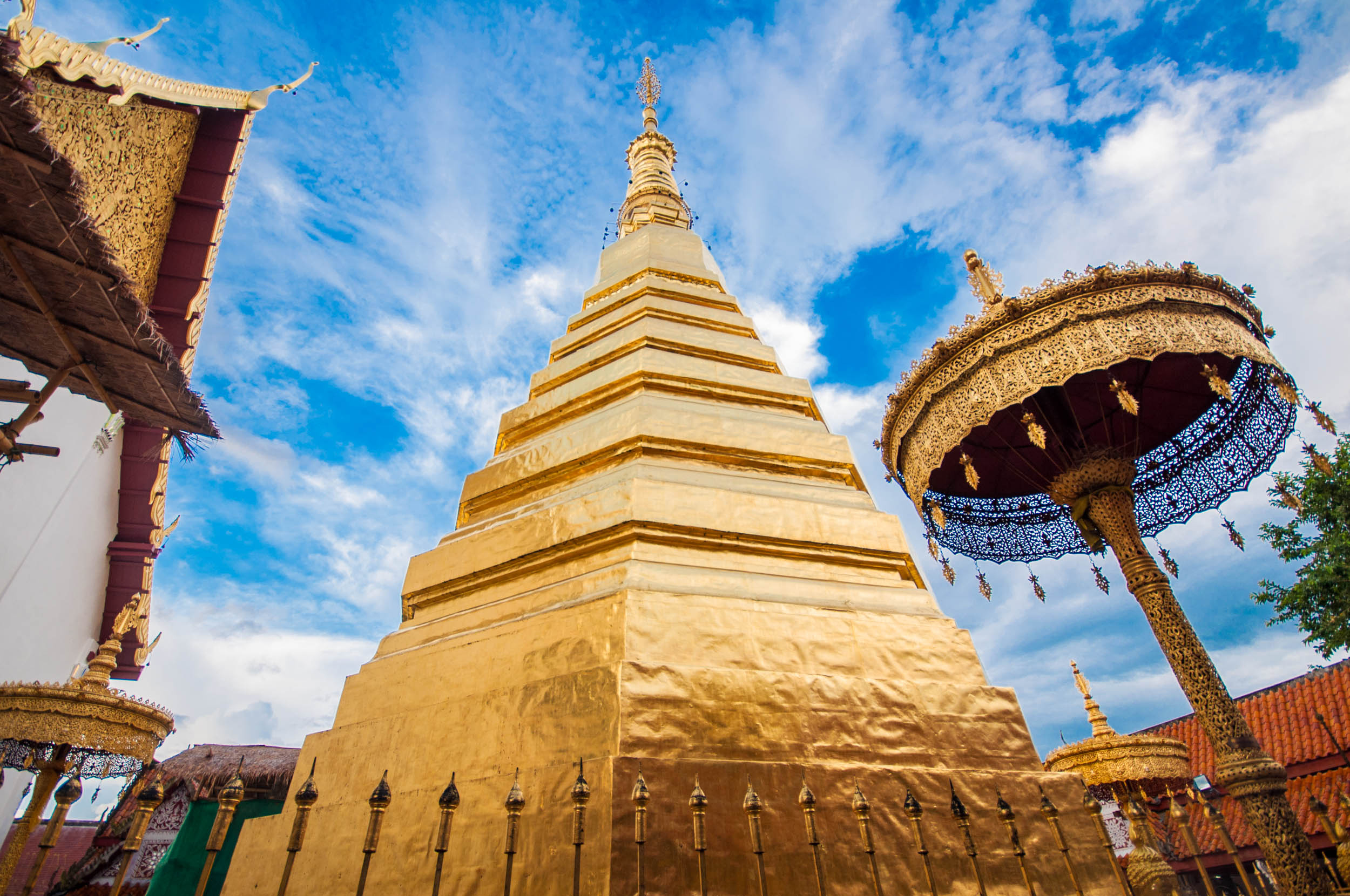
Phra That Cho Hae in Wat Phra That Cho Hae, Chao Hae sub-district

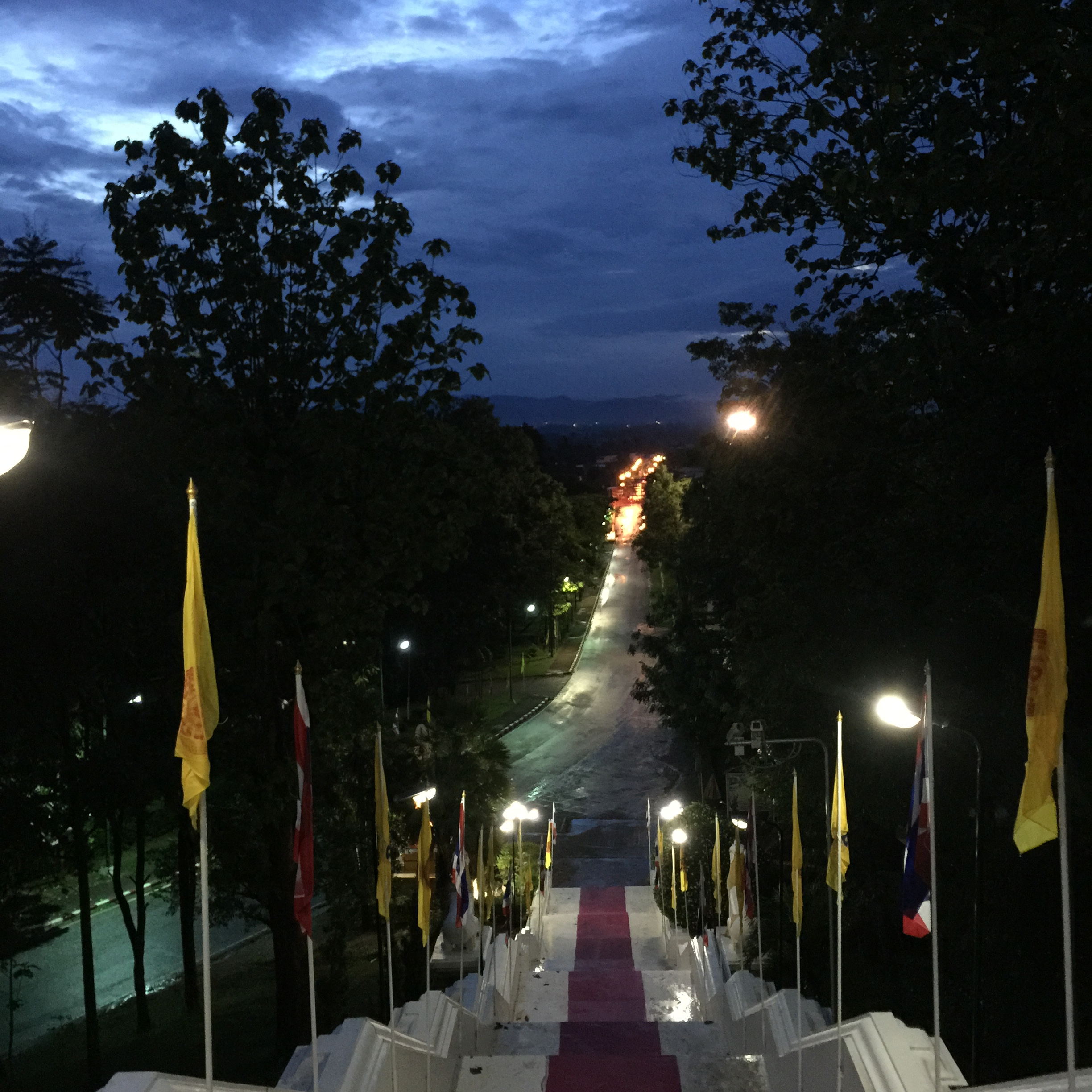
Steps of Wat Phra That Cho Hae

Cho Hae (Thai: ช่อแฮ, pronounced [t͡ɕʰɔ̂ː hɛ̄ː]; Northern Thai:) is a tambon (sub-district) of Mueang Phrae District, Phrae Province, northern Thailand.

== Naming ==
Its name after Phra That Cho Hae (พระธาตุช่อแฮ), a local ancient stūpa is highly revered and regarded as the symbol of the province of Phrae. This stūpa is believed to be the pagoda of the people who were born in the Year of the Tiger, according to the beliefs of the Lanna people since ancient times.

== Geography ==
Adjoining sub-districts are (from the north clockwise): Pa Daeng in its district, Pa Daeng in its district, Charim in Tha Pla District of Uttaradit Province, Ban Kwang in Sung Men District, respectively.

Cho Hae is about 8 km (5.0 mi) from the Phrae town.

== Administration ==
Cho Hae is governed by Subdistrict-Municipality Cho Hae (เทศบาลตำบลช่อแฮ), which covers the other 4 mubans (village) in neighbouring sub-district, Pa Daeng as well.

Cho Hae also consists of 10 administrative villages

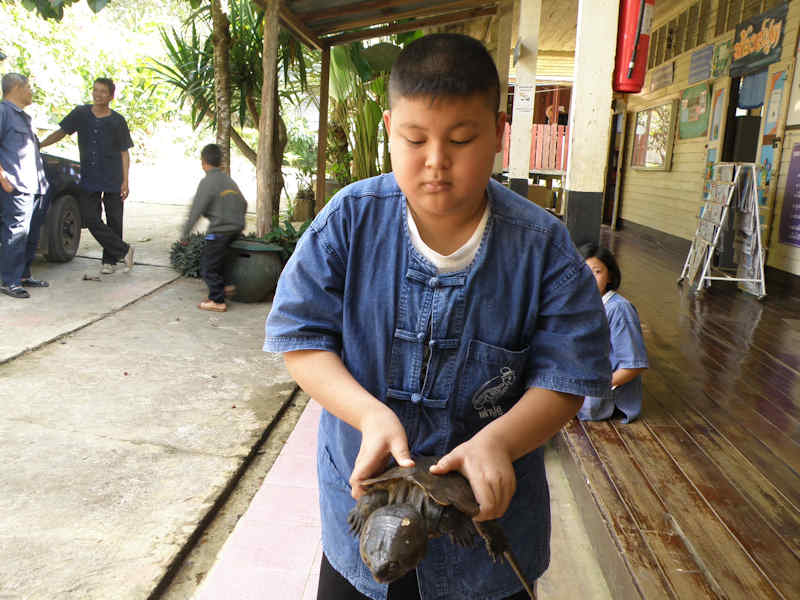
Local boy in mo hom shirt holding big-headed turtle

No.	Name	Thai
1.	Ban Mung	บ้านมุ้ง
2.	Ban Phan Choeng	บ้านพันเชิง
3.	Ban Phan Choeng	บ้านพันเชิง
4.	Ban Tham Mueang	บ้านธรรมเมือง
5.	Ban Ton Krai	บ้านต้นไคร้
6.	Ban Nai	บ้านใน
7.	Ban Pong	บ้านปง
8.	Ban Nam Jom	บ้านน้ำจ้อม
9.	Ban Na Tong	บ้านนาตอง
10.	Ban Thung Suai	บ้านทุ่งสวย

== Places of interest ==
In addition to Phra That Cho Hae, the sub-district also has other interesting places especially as Ban Na Tong, a small village in the midst of mountains and flowing Mae Gon creek. There is the Ban Na Tong Museum exhibiting prehistoric human skeletons as well as human appliances from that period unearthed in local cave.

Wat Tham Mueang also known as Wat Na Tong is one of the oldest and most important temples in the local area.

Moreover, this village is also a conservation area for big-headed turtle (Platysternon megacephalum), an endangered long-tailed freshwater turtle found only in mountain streams in northern Thailand to southern China and northern of some countries in mainland Southeast Asia. Two turtle ponds are open to visitors and allowed to touch the turtles.

== Local products ==
- Quilt
- Bedspread
