= Pak Pan railway station =

Railway station in Thailand

Coordinates: 17.9947°N 100.0066°E

Pak Pan ปากปาน
- Station in 2026

General information
- Location: Ban Pak Pan, Sai Yoi Subdistrict, Den Chai District, Phrae
- Owner: State Railway of Thailand
- Line: Northern Line
- Platforms: 1
- Tracks: 3

Other information
- Station code: ปา.

History
- Opened: 15 November 1911

Services
Preceding station	State Railway of Thailand	Following station
Den Chai towards Hua Lamphong or Krung Thep Aphiwat	Northern Line	Kaeng Luang towards Chiang Mai
Location

Pak Pan railway station is a railway station located in Sai Yoi Subdistrict, Den Chai District, Phrae. It is located 538.432 km from Bangkok railway station and is a class 3 railway station. It is on the Northern Line of the State Railway of Thailand.

It is the only railway station in Phrae to use Three Aspects Light system instead of the Semaphore system.

== Gallery ==
Current station building
