= Kaeng Luang railway station =

Railway station in Thailand

Coordinates: 18.0249°N 99.9470°E

Kaeng Luang แก่งหลวง
- Station in 2026

General information
- Location: Ban Kaeng Luang, Mae Pan Subdistrict, Long District, Phrae
- Owner: State Railway of Thailand
- Line: Northern Line
- Platforms: 1
- Tracks: 3

Other information
- Station code: กล.

Services
Preceding station	State Railway of Thailand	Following station
Pak Pan towards Hua Lamphong or Krung Thep Aphiwat	Northern Line	Huai Mae Ta Halt towards Chiang Mai
Location

Kaeng Luang railway station is a railway station in Mae Pan Subdistrict, Long District, Phrae Province. It is a class 3 railway station 546.946 km from Bangkok railway station. It is on the Northern Line of the State Railway of Thailand. The railway line between Pak Pan and Kaeng Luang runs adjacent to the Kaeng Luang rapids, of which the station is named after.

== Gallery ==
Station platform

Kaeng Luang rapids (parts of Yom river), taken from Express No.51
