= Den Chai–Chiang Khong Line =

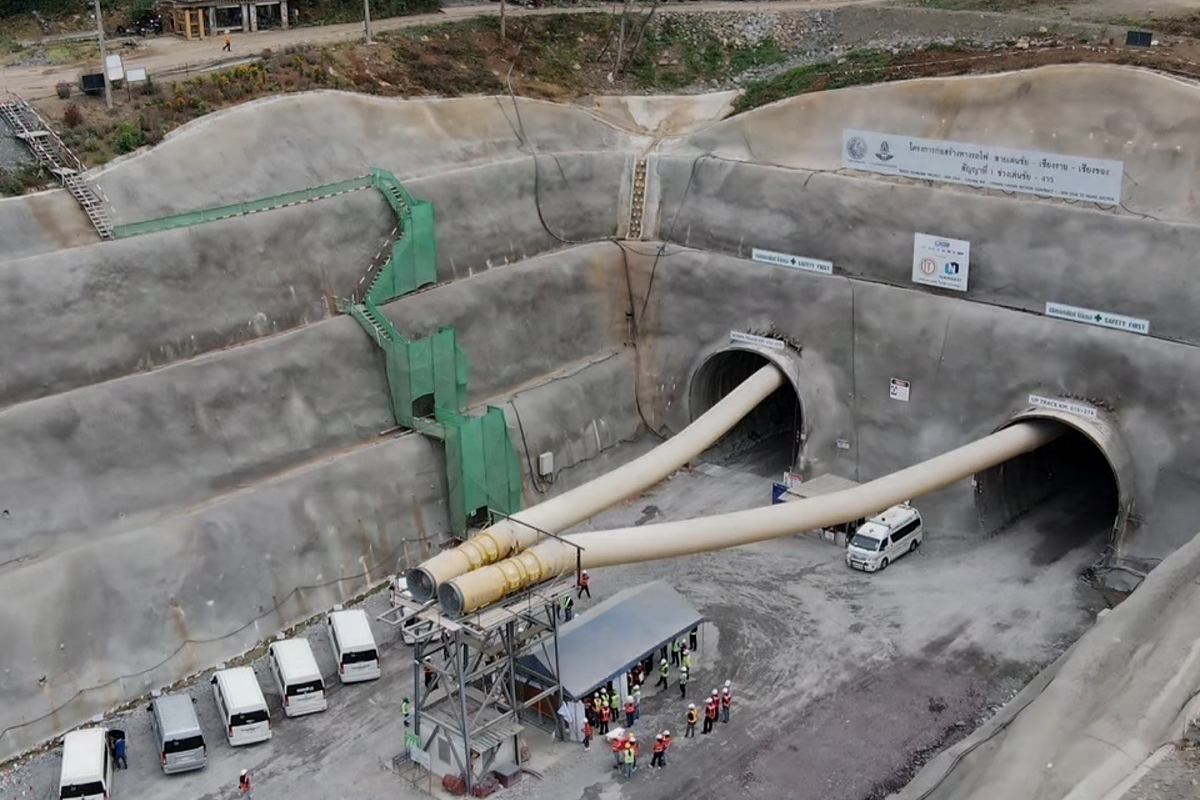
- Construction of a tunnel in Ngao in December 2024

Overview
- Status: Under construction
- Owner: State Railway of Thailand
- Termini: Den Chai; Chiang Khong

Service
- Type: Inter-city rail
- System: Northern Line
- Operator: State Railway of Thailand

History
- Opened: 2028

Technical
- Line length: 323.1 km (200.8 mi)
- Number of tracks: 1
- Track gauge: 1,000 mm (3 ft 3 3/8 in) metre gauge

The Den Chai–Chiang Rai–Chiang Khong railway line is a project of the State Railway of Thailand (SRT) and one of two extensions of the Northern Railway Line. Its objective is to support travel and freight in the northern region, including supporting the Chiang Khong freight transfer center currently under construction. This project will connect the North–South Economic Corridor from Thailand to Laos, China, Vietnam, and other economic zones under government policy. Construction was originally scheduled for 2017, but was postponed to 2021. In July 2018, the Cabinet approved the Den Chai–Chiang Rai–Chiang Khong double-track railway project, covering a distance of 323 km, with a total budget of 85.345 billion baht and a project duration of seven years. The Ministry of Transport urged the SRT to begin land acquisition and bidding by 2021, with a five-year construction period and opening service in 2028.

== History ==
The construction project for the double-track railway line Chum Thong Den Chai - Chiang Rai - Chiang Khong, a distance of 326 kilometers, was previously studied by the Thai government in 1960 and surveyed the area in 1969, designating the route Den Chai - Phrae - Song - Chiang Muan - Dok Kham Tai - Phayao - Pa Daet - Chiang Rai, a total distance of 273 kilometers.

Later, in 1994–1995, the State Railway of Thailand (SRT) hired consultants to review the study results. The conclusion was that the Den Chai Junction – Phrae – Song – Ngao (Lampang) – Phayao – Chiang Rai route would shorten the distance to approximately 246 kilometers. Consequently, in 1996–1998, the SRT spent approximately 2.2 million baht on the project. The SRT then hired a private company to survey, design, and study the impacts, leading to a Royal Decree on land expropriation in 2001. In 2004, the then-government ordered another feasibility study, citing the need to connect with southern China. In 2008, a study was also conducted to connect the border of Chiang Rai Province and China's rail system.

Until 2010–2011, studies began on double-track railways to increase the width to 1.435 meters. In the case of the route in Chiang Rai Province, the route was separated to the second Chiang Saen Mekong River Port in Ban Saeo Subdistrict, Chiang Saen District, and the Thai-Lao Mekong River Bridge in Chiang Khong District.

The latest route studied has a total distance of approximately 323.1 kilometers, with a total of 26 stations passing through Phrae, Lampang, Phayao, and Chiang Rai provinces, and a tunnel will be drilled into the mountain to connect the route to Chiang Khong District.

In 2018, the Cabinet approved the construction project of the Den Chai-Chiang Rai-Chiang Khong double-track railway line, consisting of 26 stations, 4 cargo handling yards, 1 container storage yard, 4 railway tunnels, 40 roads over the railway, and 102 roads under the railway. The project began in Phrae, Lampang, Phayao, Chiang Rai, and Chiang Khong provinces.

On March 19, 2021, the State Railway of Thailand began opening bid envelopes via the electronic procurement system (e-bidding) from March 19 to May 17, 2021, and submitted proposals on May 18, 2021. The construction is divided into three contracts: Contract 1, Den Chai- Ngao section, 103 km long; Contract 2, Ngao-Chiang Rai section, 132 km long; and Contract 3, Chiang Rai-Chiang Khong section, 87 km long. The construction schedule is 5 years, with service opening in 2028.

On June 27, 2021, the Royal Gazette website published the land expropriation demarcations in some areas of Den Chai, Sung Men, Mueang Phrae, Nong Muang Khai, and Song Districts in Phrae Province ; Ngao District in Lampang Province ; Mueang Phayao, Dok Khamtai, and Phu Kam Yao Districts in Phayao Province; and Pa Daet, Thoeng, Mueang Chiang Rai, Wiang Chai, Wiang Chiang Rung, Doi Luang, and Chiang Khong Districts in Chiang Rai Province to construct the Den Chai–Chiang Rai–Chiang Khong Railway Project 2021. This Royal Decree will take effect the day after its publication in the Royal Gazette (May 28, 2021). The land expropriation covers over 10,000 rai and 7,000 plots of land.

On December 16, 2021, Mr. Nirut Maneephan, Governor of the State Railway of Thailand, approved the construction contract for the Den Chai–Chiang Rai–Chiang Khong double-track railway project, valued at 72.92 billion baht, from three contractors: Contract 1, the Den Chai–Ngao section, is being awarded by Italian-Thai Development Public Company Limited (ITD) in collaboration with Nawarat Patanakarn Public Company Limited; Contract 2, the Ngao–Chiang Rai section, is being awarded by the CKST Joint Venture, comprising CH. Karnchang Public Company Limited, Sino-Thai Engineering and Construction Public Company Limited, and Buriram Panasit Co., Ltd.; and Contract 3, the Chiang Rai–Chiang Khong section, is being awarded by the CKST Joint Venture, comprising CH. Karnchang Public Company Limited, Sino-Thai Engineering and Construction Public Company Limited, and Chiang Mai Construction Co., Ltd.

On December 29, 2021, at the State Railway of Thailand, Mr. Nirut Maneephan, Governor of the State Railway of Thailand, signed a contract for the construction of the Den Chai-Chiang Rai-Chiang Khong double-track railway project, as well as signing an Integrity Pact for cooperation in preventing corruption in government procurement between the State Railway of Thailand, which is the owner of the project

When the project is completed, it will support travel, border trade, tourism, and logistics in the upper northern region, including supporting the Chiang Khong goods transfer center, connecting trade along the North-South Economic Corridor from Thailand to Laos, Burma, and southern China. It will also help accelerate the development of the Chiang Rai Special Economic Zone, which the government is pushing for.

== Districts through which the route passes ==
District	Province
Chiang Saen / Doi Luang / Wiang Chiang Rung / Chiang Khong / Wiang Chai / Chiang Rai / Pa Daet / Thoeng	Chiang Rai
Phu Kamyao / Phayao / Dok Kham Tai	Phayao
Ngao	Lampang
Song / Nong Muang Khai / Phrae / Sung Men / Den Chai	Phrae

== Construction contract ==
Contract	Period	Distance (kilometers)	Auction winner	Progress 20.661% (as of September 2024)	Progress 50.496% (as of December 2025)
1	Den Chai-Ngao	104	ITD-Nawarat Joint Venture	10.44%	47.618%
2	Ngao-Chiang Rai	132	CKST-DC 2 Joint Venture	24.35%	56.726%
3	Chiang Rai-Chiang Khong	87	CKST-DC 3 Joint Venture	29.55%	45.798%

== Construction progress ==
Date	Progress	Advancement by
November 2022	0.52%	
December 2022	0.606%	0.094%
January 2023	0.743%	0.137%
February 2023	0.825%	0.082%
March 2023	0.925%	0.1%
April 2023	1.021%	0.096%
May 2023	1.21%	0.189%
June 2023	1.485%	0.275%
July 2023	1.789%	0.304%
August 2023	2.02%	0.231%
September 2023	2.423%	0.403%
October 2023	3.016%	0.593%
November 2023	3.773%	0.757%
December 2023	4.832%	1.059%
January 2024	5.449%	0.617%
February 2024	6.695%	1.246%
March 2024	8.054%	1.359%
April 2024	9.409%	1.355%
May 2024	11.288%	1.879%
June 2024	12.675%	1.387%
July 2024	15.264%	2.589%
August 2024	16.852%	1.588%
September 2024	18.355%	1.503%
October 2024	19.88%	1.525%
November 2024	21.579%	1.699%
December 2024	23.99%	2.411%
January 2025	25.785%	1.795%
February 2025	28.182%	2.397%
March 2025	31.974%	3.792%
April 2025	33.72%	1.746%
May 2025	36.067%	2.347%
June 2025	38.341%	2.274%
July 2025	40.295%	1.954%
August 2025	41.986%	1.691%
September 2025	43.984%	1.998%
October 2025	46.112%	2.128%
November 2025	48.62%	2.508%
December 2025	50.496%	1.876%
January 2026	53.421%	2.925%
February 2026	56.461%	3.04%
March 2026	59.57%	3.109%
