= Nong Muang Khai district =

Nong Muang Khai หนองม่วงไข่
- District
- District location in Phrae province
- Coordinates: 18°15′53″N 100°11′24″E
- Country: Thailand
- Province: Phrae
- Seat: Nong Muang Khai

Area
  - Total: 221.65 km^{2} (85.58 sq mi)

Population (2005)
  - Total: 19,302
- Time zone: UTC+7 (ICT)
- Postal code: 54170
- Geocode: 5408

Nong Muang Khai (Thai: หนองม่วงไข่, pronounced [nɔ̌ːŋ mûa̯ŋ kʰàj]) is a district (amphoe) in the central part of Phrae province, northern Thailand.

== History ==
The minor district (king amphoe) Nong Muang Khai was established on 1 April 1990 from tambons Mae Kham Mi and Nong Muang Khai of Rong Kwang district and Wang Luang and Nam Rat of Song district. It was made a subordinate of Rong Kwang District. It was upgraded to a full district on 7 September 1995.

== Geography ==
Neighboring districts are (from the north clockwise): Song, Rong Kwang, Mueang Phrae, and Long.

== Administration ==
The district is divided into six sub-districts (tambons), which are further subdivided into 34 villages (mubans). Nong Muang Khai is a township (thesaban tambon) and covers most parts of tambon Nong Muang Khai. There are a further five tambon administrative organizations (TAO).

No.	Name	Thai name	Villages	Pop.
1.	Mae Kham Mi	แม่คำมี	4	2,262
2.	Nong Muang Khai	หนองม่วงไข่	8	4,853
3.	Nam Rat	น้ำรัด	6	3,594
4.	Wang Luang	วังหลวง	5	2,716
5.	Tamnak Tham	ตำหนักธรรม	7	3,549
6.	Thung Khaeo	ทุ่งแค้ว	4	2,328
