= Mo hom =

Thai fabric and shirt

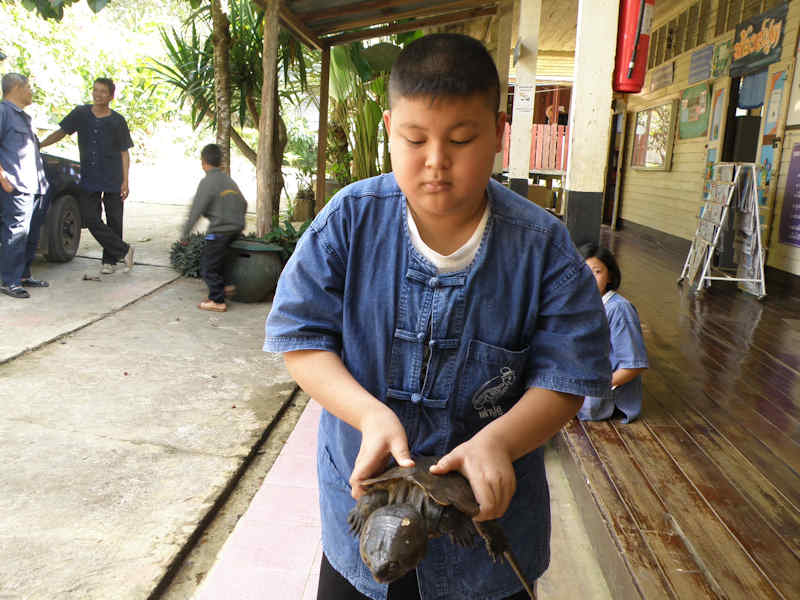
Thai boy wearing a mo hom shirt

Mo hom or mor hom (Thai: หม้อห้อม, RTGS: mohom, pronounced [mɔ̂ː.hɔ̂m]) is a traditional Thai fabric or shirt made from the fabric. The shirt is a short-sleeved and round-necked with no collar or lapel, usually dark blue or black. The word mo hom comes from northern Thai language: mo means 'pot' and hom refers to the indigo plant, with its trunk and leaves placed water to produce the deep blue dye.

== History ==
Dyeing with a black-navy colour in Phrae Province is thought to come from people who immigrated from Chiang Saen, Xishuangbanna, and Laos since the Thonburi Kingdom. They brought the craft of dyeing with three kinds of plants: kram, hom, and homkriea, and used it to create mo hom fabric.

Mo hom is a Lan Na word. It does not mean 'shirt' but rather 'black navy' which is the colour of the shirt. Although mo hom is a local Lan Na word, the shirt is not the original men's shirt in Lanna. The original is white cotton shirt called a "Hadook" shirt.

Mo hom shirts became popular throughout the country in 1953, when Mr. Kriengsri Nimmanhemin arranged a banquet for Mr. Sanya Thammasak and the US consul in Chiang Mai. Dress for the event was the mo hom shirt.

== Etymology ==
Mo hom means 'black navy' which is a combination of two words, mo means 'black or navy colour' and hom refers to the plant that gives off navy dye, Baphicacanthus cusia Brem. Lan Na people pronounce mo but some people misunderstand and pronounce it in a different tone and spoken more slowly than mo so it changes the meaning to 'pot' and the meaning of the phrase to 'dye in the pot' instead of 'black navy colour'.

== Manufacture ==
There are two steps:

=== Preparing hom ===
1. Collect leaves and stems from plant hom, and soak in rain water for 72 hours. You will get a green colour. Leave old leaves and stems and add a new batch. Leave it to steep. You will get a navy colour. Filter it and keep the fermented water. After that, add calcium hydroxide (slaked lime) and mix it and filter it with cheese cloth.

2. Prepare a plastic bucket and pierce a small hole at the bottom. Add ash and rain water. Filter it and mix with colour from fermented hom. Add calcium hydroxide and mix it again and you will get a colour for dyeing.

=== Dyeing ===
1. Pick a cotton textile to soak in bucket with clean water. After that, air dry it.

2. Put the dry textile into the dye bucket, wear plastic glove and mix the textile and colour with hand. After that, air dry it until it is half dry. Re-dye the fabric five or six times until it has the desired hue.

== Fabrics ==
White cotton fabric is used for dyeing. Originally, people will collect very old cotton flower because it will spout and show fluffy cotton and then collect to dry by sunlight. It is cleaned, spun the ingredient and woven on a kee (a local loom).

In the past, mo hom fabric was produced for family use. Today there high, so most fabric is factory-produced.

The biggest source of traditional production in Thailand is in Baan Thung Hong, Mueang Phrae District, Phrae Province. The places where you can buy mo hom cloth are areas around Phrae and traditional markets around Thailand.
