= Rong Kwang district =

Rong Kwang ร้องกวาง
- District
- District location in Phrae province
- Coordinates: 18°20′23″N 100°19′3″E
- Country: Thailand
- Province: Phrae
- Seat: Rong Kwang

Area
  - Total: 631.4 km^{2} (243.8 sq mi)

Population (2008)
  - Total: 51,016
  - Density: 81.4/km^{2} (211/sq mi)
- Time zone: UTC+7 (ICT)
- Postal code: 54140
- Geocode: 5402

Rong Kwang (Thai: ร้องกวาง, pronounced [rɔ́ːŋ kwāːŋ]; Northern Thai: ᩁ᩶ᩬᨦᨣ᩠ᩅᩣ᩠ᨦ, pronounced [hɔ́ːŋ kwǎːŋ]) is a district (amphoe) in the northeastern part of Phrae province, northern Thailand.

== Geography ==
Neighboring districts are (from the southwest clockwise): Mueang Phrae, Nong Muang Khai, and Song of Phrae Province; Wiang Sa, Na Noi, and Na Muen of Nan province.

== History ==
The minor district (king amphoe) Rong Kwang was upgraded to a full district in 1909.

== Administration ==
The district is divided into 11 sub-districts (tambons), which are further subdivided into 93 villages (mubans). The township (thesaban tambon) Rong Kwang covers parts of tambon Rong Kwang and parts of tambons Rong Khem and Thung Si. There are a further nine tambon administrative organizations (TAO).

No.	Name	Thai	Villages	Pop.
1.	Rong Kwang	ร้องกวาง	14	6,996
4.	Rong Khem	ร้องเข็ม	11	5,135
5.	Nam Lao	น้ำเลา	10	5,578
6.	Ban Wiang	บ้านเวียง	14	7,591
7.	Thung Si	ทุ่งศรี	5	3,320
8.	Mae Yang Tan	แม่ยางตาล	10	5,238
9.	Mae Yang Ho	แม่ยางฮ่อ	5	3,128
10.	Phai Thon	ไผ่โทน	9	4,192
13.	Huai Rong	ห้วยโรง	8	3,042
14.	Mae Sai	แม่ทราย	4	2,851
15.	Mae Yang Rong	แม่ยางร้อง	6	3,945

Missing numbers are tambons which now form Nong Muang Khai District.
