= Na Muen district =

Na Muean นาหมื่น
- District
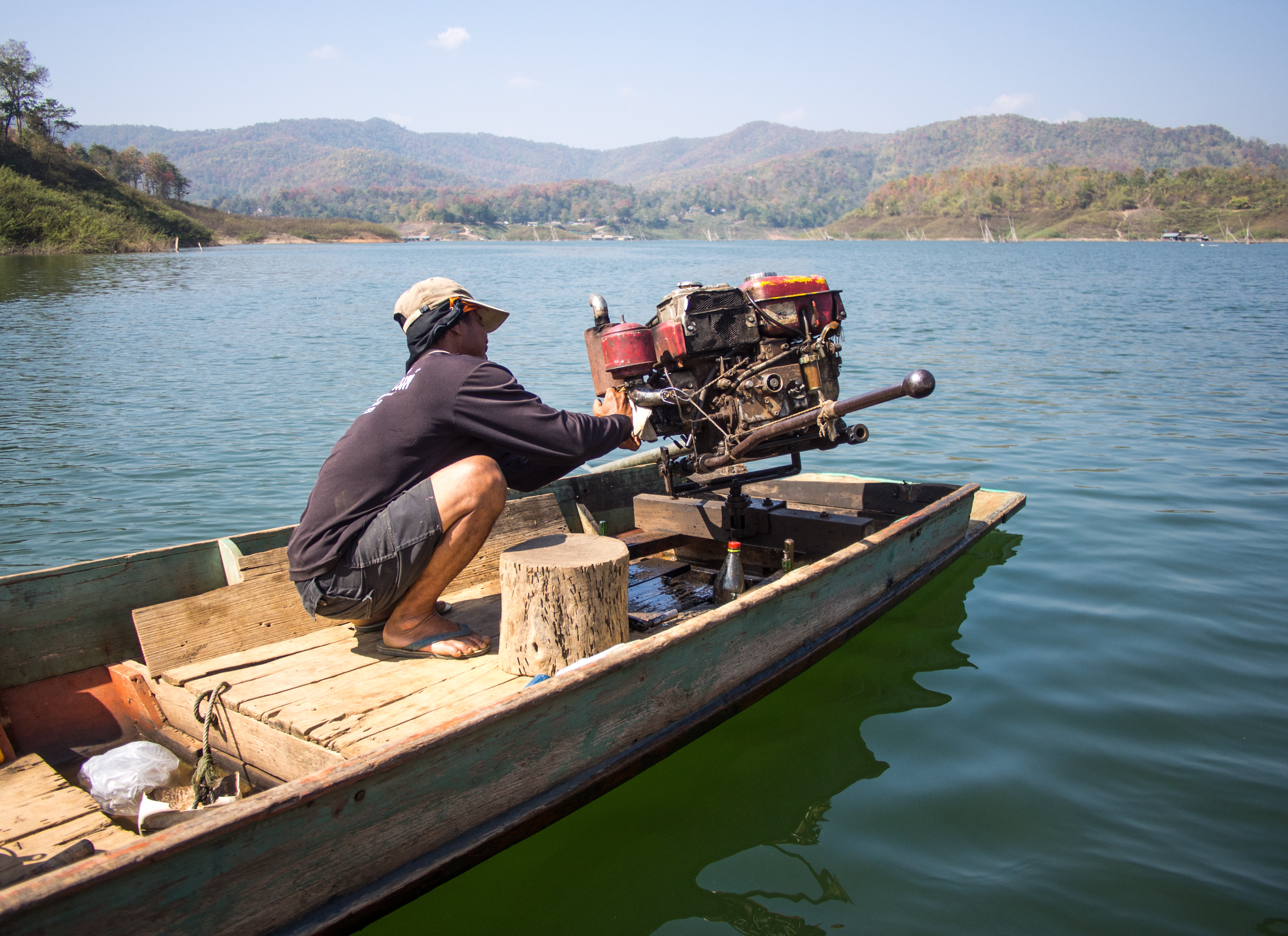
- A ferry in Sirikit Dam

- District location in Nan province
- Coordinates: 18°11′22″N 100°39′32″E
- Country: Thailand
- Province: Nan

Government
  - Marshal: Suraphan Trimongkon

Area
  - Total: 785.608 km^{2} (303.325 sq mi)

Population (2009)
  - Total: 14,817
  - Density: 18.861/km^{2} (48.849/sq mi)
- Time zone: UTC+7 (ICT)
- Postal code: 55180
- Geocode: 5510

Na Muean (Thai: นาหมื่น, pronounced [nāː mɯ̀ːn]) is a district (amphoe) in the southern part of Nan province, northern Thailand.

== History ==
The minor district (king amphoe) Na Muean was established on 9 October 1978 as a subordinate of Na Noi district, from which it was split off. Originally it consisted of the three tambons, Na Thanung, Bo Kaeo, and Mueang Li. It was upgraded to a full district on 4 July 1994.

== Geography ==
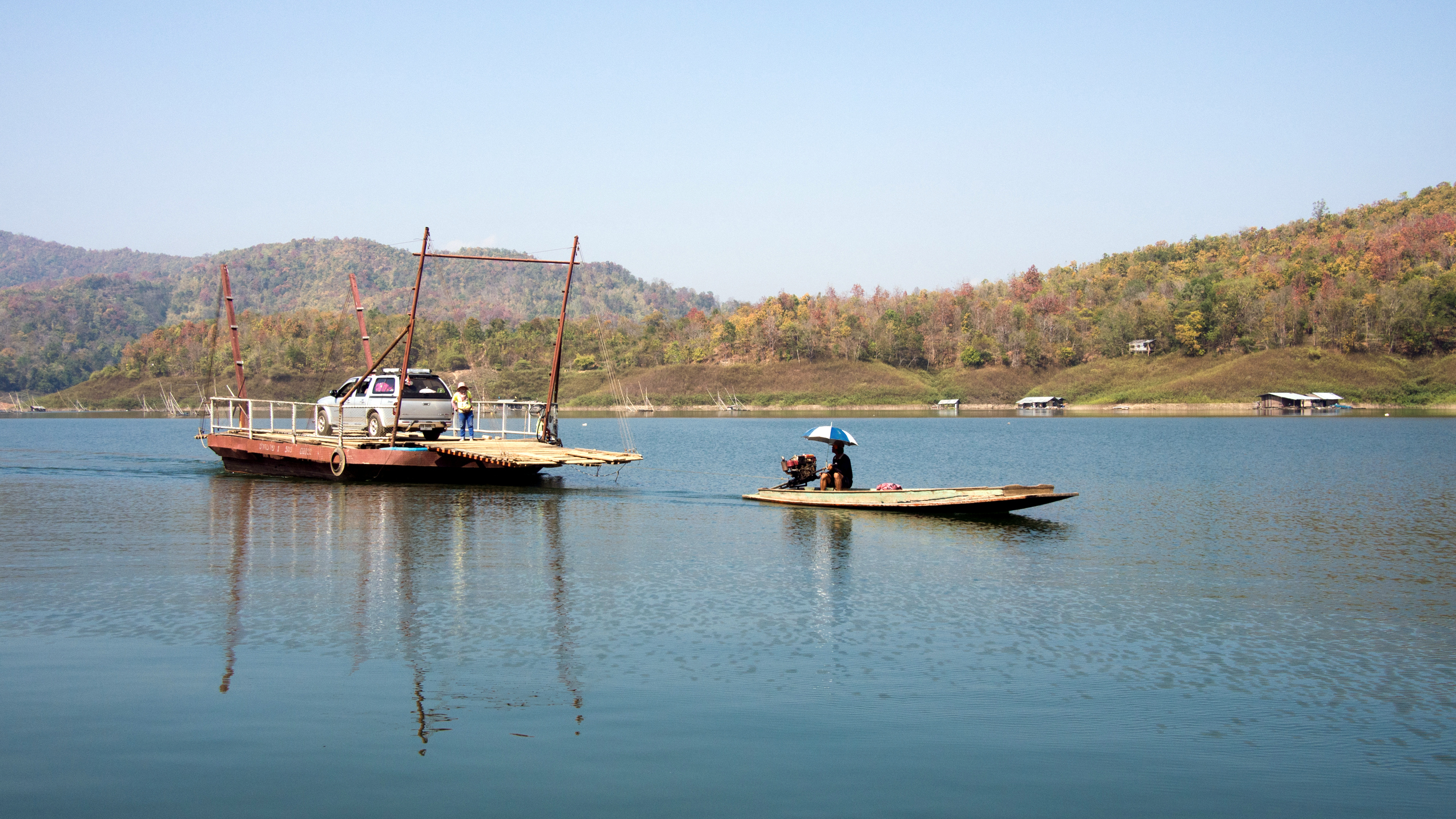
The ferry over the Nan River Reservoir, created by the Sirikit Dam, connecting the village of Pak Nai in Na Muen District with the southern shore

Neighboring districts are, from the north clockwise, Na Noi of Nan Province, Ban Khok, Fak Tha, Nam Pat and Tha Pla of Uttaradit province, Mueang Phrae and Rong Kwang of Phrae province.

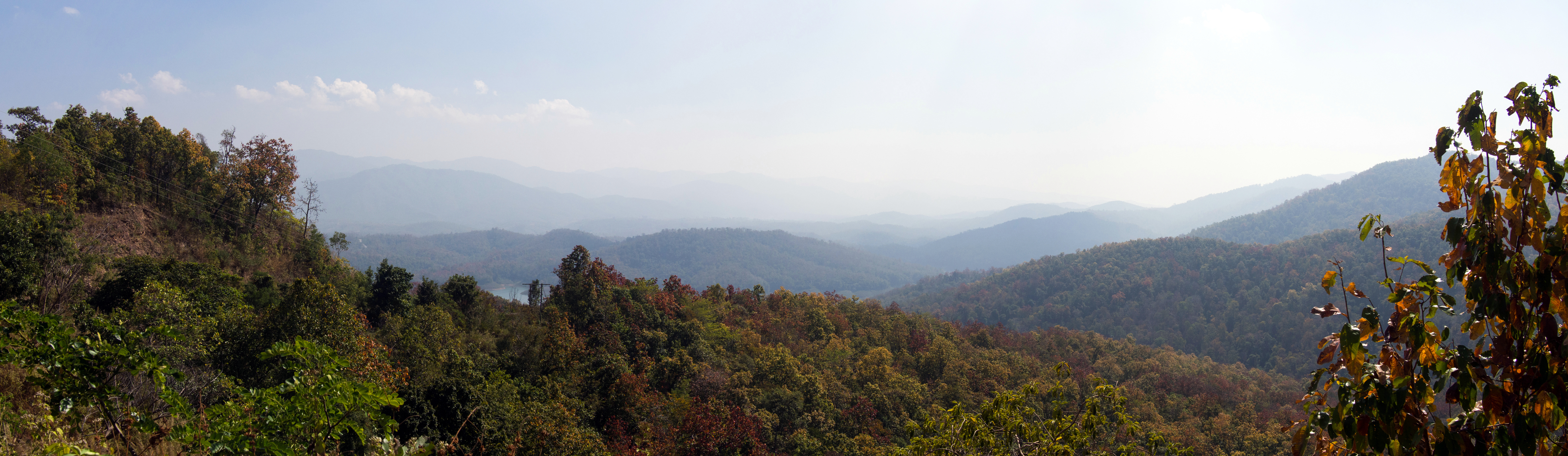
Phi Pan Nam Range in Na Muen District.

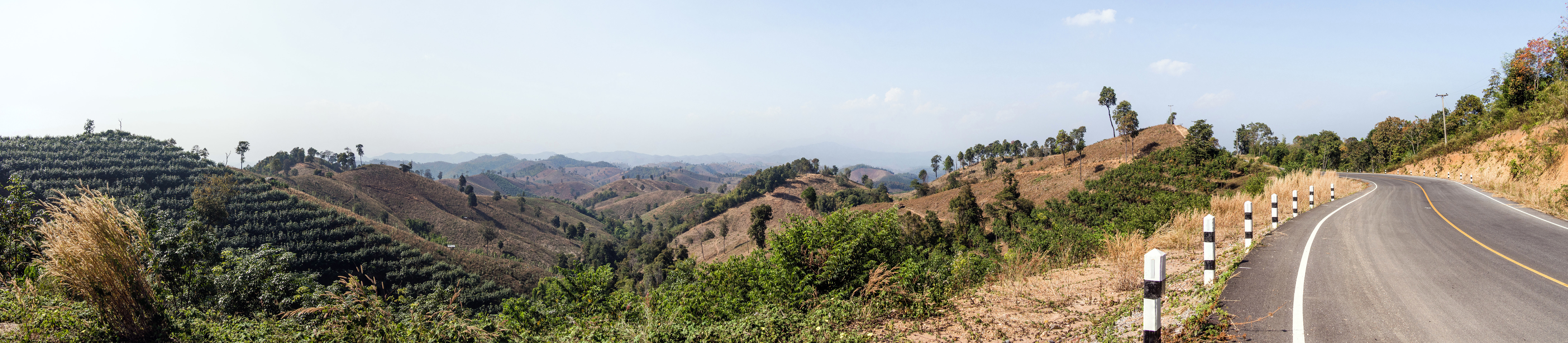
From Rte 1339 in Na Muen District.

== Administration ==
The district is divided into four sub-districts (tambons), which are further subdivided into 48 villages (mubans). Bo Kaeo is the township (thesaban tambon) and covers the complete area of tambon Bo Kaeo. There are a further three tambon administrative organizations (TAO).

No.	Name	Thai name	Villages	Pop.
1.	Na Thanung	นาทะนุง	17	4,989
2.	Bo Kaeo	บ่อแก้ว	14	4,756
3.	Mueang Li	เมืองลี	7	2,126
4.	Ping Luang	ปิงหลวง	10	3,168
