= Long district, Thailand =

Long ลอง
- District
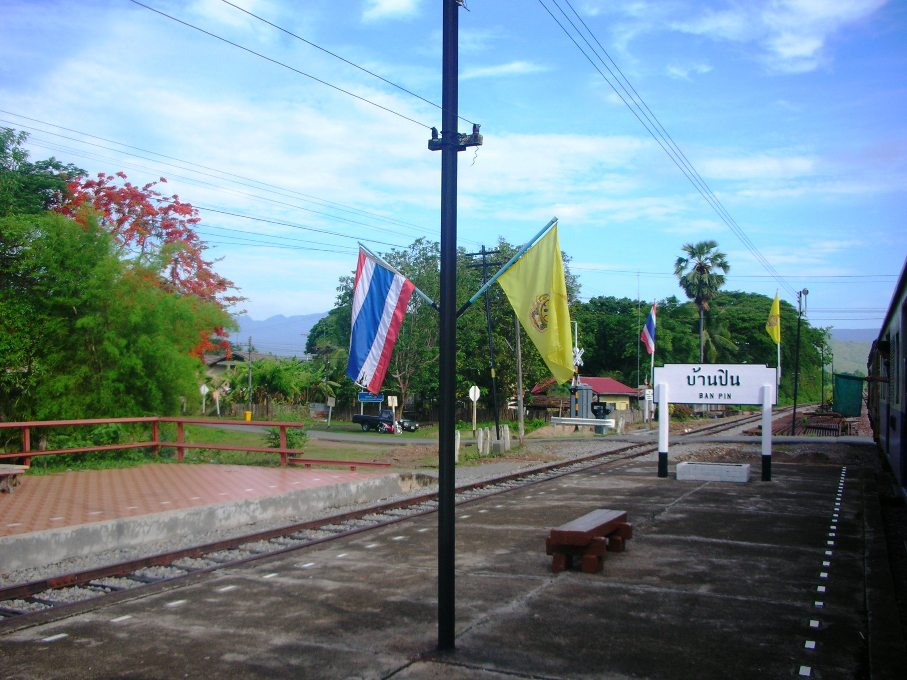
- Ban Pin railway station with the Phi Pan Nam Range in the background

- District location in Phrae province
- Coordinates: 18°4′32″N 99°49′57″E
- Country: Thailand
- Province: Phrae

Area
  - Total: 1,447.3 km^{2} (558.8 sq mi)

Population (2005)
  - Total: 57,940
  - Density: 40/km^{2} (100/sq mi)
- Time zone: UTC+7 (ICT)
- Postal code: 54150
- Geocode: 5403

Long (Thai: ลอง, pronounced [lɔ̄ːŋ]) is a district (amphoe) in the western part of Phrae province, northern Thailand.

== Geography ==
Neighboring districts are (from the north clockwise) Song, Nong Muang Khai, Mueang Phrae, Sung Men, Den Chai, and Wang Chin of Phrae province; Mae Tha and Mae Mo of Lampang province.

The Phi Pan Nam Mountains dominate the landscape of the district. Doi Pha Klong National Park is in Long district.

== Administration ==
The district is divided into nine sub-districts (tambons), which are further subdivided into 89 villages (mubans). There are two townships (thesaban tambons), Ban Pin and Huai O, both covering parts of the same-named tambon. There are another nine tambon administrative organizations (TAO).

No.	Name	Thai name	Villages	Pop.
1.	Huai O	ห้วยอ้อ	18	12,596
2.	Ban Pin	บ้านปิน	13	8,018
3.	Ta Pha Mok	ต้าผามอก	8	4,793
4.	Wiang Ta	เวียงต้า	10	6,874
5.	Pak Kang	ปากกาง	9	4,455
6.	Hua Thung	หัวทุ่ง	9	6,154
7.	Thung Laeng	ทุ่งแล้ง	12	7,539
8.	Bo Lek Long	บ่อเหล็กลอง	8	4,321
9.	Mae Pan	แม่ปาน	7	3,190
