= Den Chai district =

Den Chai เด่นชัย
- District
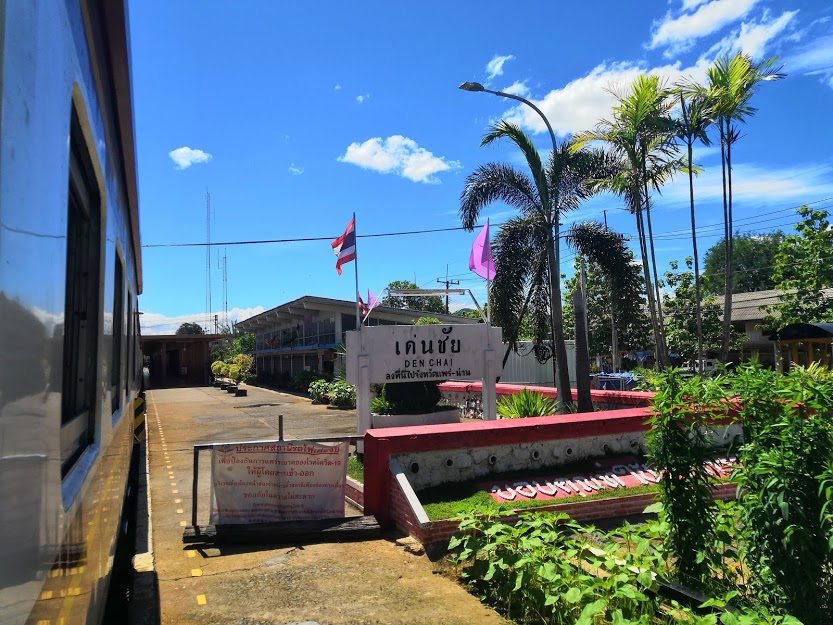
- Den Chai Railway Station in 2020

- District location in Phrae province
- Coordinates: 17°58′43″N 100°3′31″E
- Country: Thailand
- Province: Phrae
- Seat: Den Chai

Area
  - Total: 265.6 km^{2} (102.5 sq mi)

Population (2005)
  - Total: 37,440
  - Density: 141/km^{2} (370/sq mi)
- Time zone: UTC+7 (ICT)
- Postal code: 54140
- Geocode: 5405

Den Chai (Thai: เด่นชัย, pronounced [dèn tɕʰāj]; Northern Thai: ᩮᨯ᩠᩵ᨶᨩᩱ᩠ᨿ, pronounced [dèn tɕāj]) is a district (amphoe) in the southern part of Phrae province, northern Thailand.

== History ==
In the reign of King Chulalongkorn (Rama V), Tai people working at the gemstone mine at Doi Pok Ka Long robbed Mueang Phrae. The king ordered Phraya Surasak Montri to redress the wrongdoing. Phraya Surasak Montri based his camp in Ban Den Thap Chai. After he resolved the issue, the name of the camp became the village name. Later the village was upgraded to a tambon.

During World War I an army base was in Den Chai, but was later merged with the Lampang army base in 1933. Today it is the cavalry base 12th, Phraya Chaiyabun camp.

Den Chai was created as a minor district (king amphoe) of Sung Men district on 24 January 1963. It was upgraded to a full district in 1965. Den Chai's importance grew when the Northern Line railway was built passing through the district.

== Geography ==
Neighboring districts are (from the west clockwise): Wang Chin, Long, and Sung Men of Phrae Province; Mueang Uttaradit and Laplae of Uttaradit province; and Si Satchanalai of Sukhothai province

== Transport ==
Den Chai is accessed by road and rail travel. National Highways Route 11 and 101 traverse Den Chai and there are regular trains to/from Bangkok daily at Den Chai Railway Station. About six kilometres from Den Chai Station in Ban Mae Phuak is another station, Mae Phuak Station. As of 2018, it is classified as a "train stop", not a "train station" by the State Railway of Thailand. The station building is unusual: it consists of twin two storey structures joined by a one-storey administrative office. The building was awarded a conservation award from the Association of Siamese Architects in 2016 and is now protected.

== Administration ==
The district is divided into five sub-districts (tambons), which are further subdivided into 52 villages (mubans). There are two townships (thesaban tambons): Den Chai covers parts of tambons Den Chai, Mae Chua, and Pong Pa Wai; Mae Chua covers other parts of tambon Mae Chua. There are a further five tambon administrative organizations (TAO).

No.	Name	Thai name	Villages	Pop.
1.	Den Chai	เด่นชัย	11	12,506
2.	Mae Chua	แม่จั๊วะ	10	7,478
3.	Sai Yoi	ไทรย้อย	12	6,485
4.	Huai Rai	ห้วยไร่	9	5,434
5.	Pong Pa Wai	ปงป่าหวาย	10	5,537
