= Sung Men district =

Sung Men สูงเม่น
- District
- District location in Phrae province
- Coordinates: 18°3′7″N 100°6′42″E
- Country: Thailand
- Province: Phrae
- Seat: Sung Men

Area
  - Total: 375.0 km^{2} (144.8 sq mi)

Population (2005)
  - Total: 80,129
  - Density: 213.7/km^{2} (553/sq mi)
- Time zone: UTC+7 (ICT)
- Postal code: 54130
- Geocode: 5404

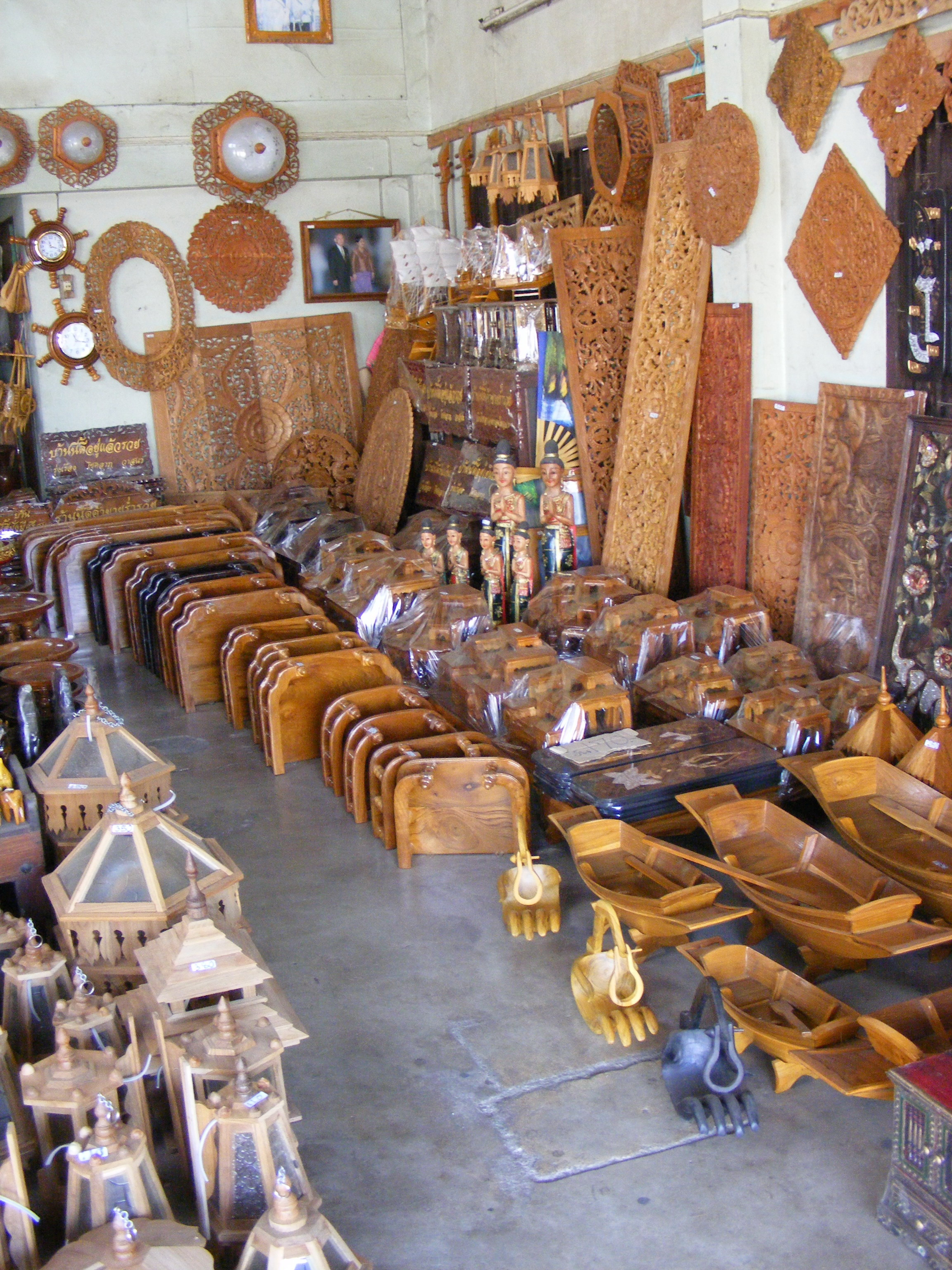
Community store, Sung Men district

Sung Men (Thai: สูงเม่น, pronounced [sǔːŋ mên]) is a district (amphoe) of Phrae province, northern Thailand.

== History ==
In 1903 the district name was Mae Phuak (แม่พวก) and was centered in Ban Sung Men. The government changed the district name to Sung Men in 1917.

== Geography ==
Neighboring districts are (from the southwest clockwise) Den Chai, Long, and Mueang Phrae of Phrae Province; Tha Pla and Mueang Uttaradit of Uttaradit province.

The important water resource is the Yom River.

== Administration ==
The district is divided into 12 sub-districts (tambons), which are further subdivided into 109 villages (mubans). The townships (thesaban tambons) Sung Men covers parts of tambon Sung Men. There are a further 12 tambon administrative organizations (TAO).

No.	Name	Thai name	Villages	Pop.
1.	Sung Men	สูงเม่น	9	7,711
2.	Nam Cham	น้ำชำ	15	10,094
3.	Hua Fai	หัวฝาย	13	10,610
4.	Don Mun	ดอนมูล	10	7,701
5.	Ban Lao	บ้านเหล่า	9	5,885
6.	Ban Kwang	บ้านกวาง	6	3,496
7.	Ban Pong	บ้านปง	6	5,151
8.	Ban Kat	บ้านกาศ	7	3,427
9.	Rong Kat	ร่องกาศ	11	7,641
10.	Sop Sai	สบสาย	6	3,891
11.	Wiang Thong	เวียงทอง	12	10,485
12.	Phra Luang	พระหลวง	5	4,037
