= Mueang Phrae district =

Mueang Phrae เมืองแพร่
- District
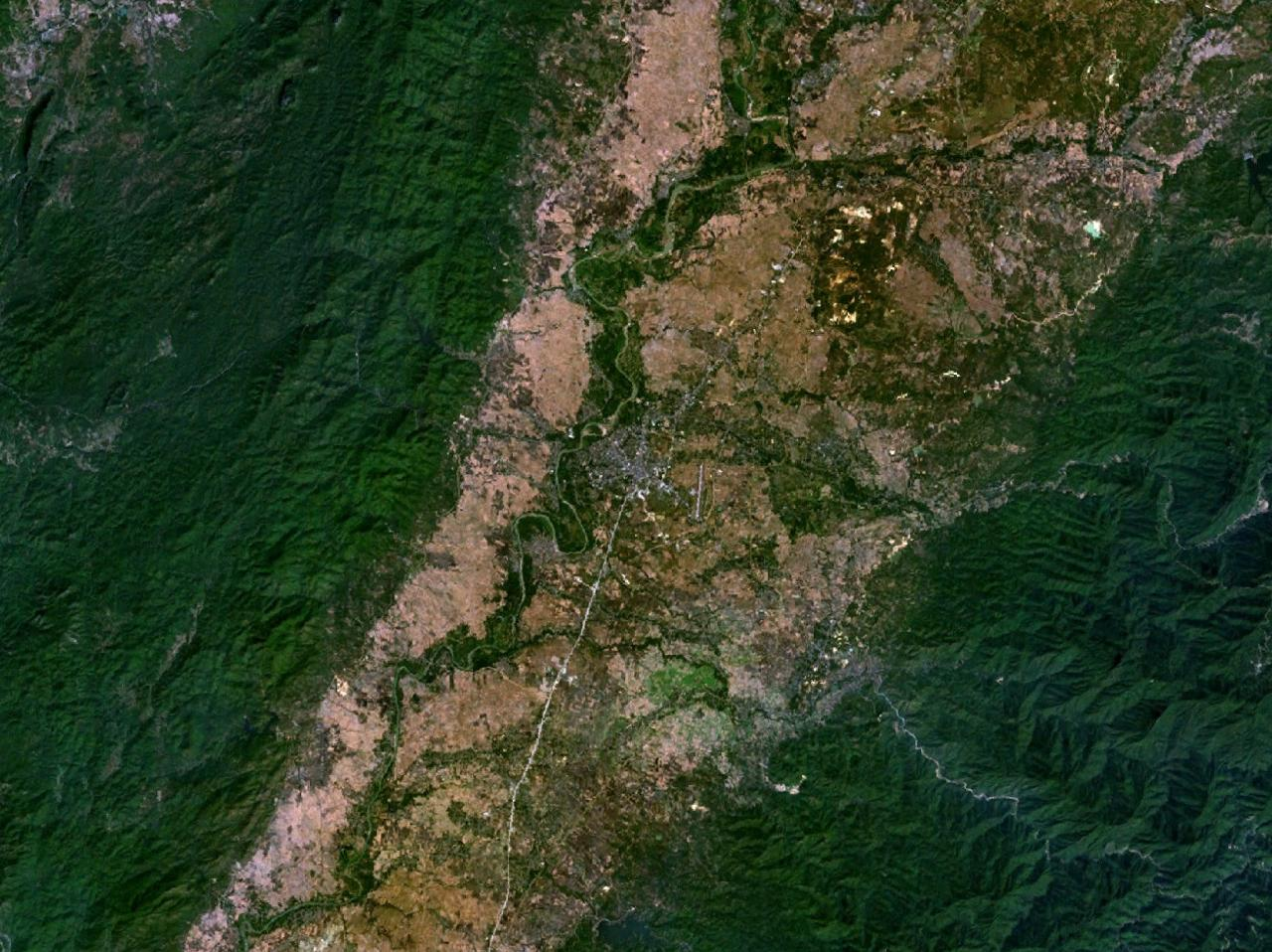
- NASA satellite photo of Mueang Phrae District

- District location in Phrae province
- Coordinates: 18°8′44″N 100°8′29″E
- Country: Thailand
- Province: Phrae

Area
  - Total: 756.1 km^{2} (291.9 sq mi)

Population (2005)
  - Total: 123,811
  - Density: 163.7/km^{2} (424/sq mi)
- Time zone: UTC+7 (ICT)
- Postal code: 54000
- Geocode: 5401

Mueang Phrae (Thai: เมืองแพร่, pronounced [mɯ̄aŋ pʰrɛ̂ː]; Northern Thai: ᨾᩮᩬᩥᨦᨻᩯᩖ᩵, pronounced [mɯ̄aŋ pɛ̂ː]) is the capital district of Phrae province, northern Thailand.

== Geography ==
Neighboring districts are (from the southwest clockwise): Sung Men, Long, Nong Muang Khai, and Rong Kwang of Phrae Province; Na Muen of Nan province; and Tha Pla of Uttaradit province.

The Phi Pan Nam Range dominates the landscape of the district. One of the three basins of the Yom River flows near Mueang Phrae.

== Administration ==
The district is divided into 20 sub-districts (tambons), which are further subdivided into 157 villages (mubans). Phrae itself is a town (thesaban mueang) and covers tambon Nai Wiang. There are three more townships (thesaban tambons): Thung Hong and Mae Lai both cover tambons of the same name, Cho Hae covers tambon Cho Hae and parts of Padaeng. There are a further 20 tambon administrative organizations (TAO).

No.	Name	Thai name	Villages	Pop.
1.	Nai Wiang	ในเวียง	-	15,638
2.	Na Chak	นาจักร	8	7,232
3.	Nam Cham	น้ำชำ	4	1,651
4.	Pa Daeng	ป่าแดง	10	2,678
5.	Thung Hong	ทุ่งโฮ้ง	7	6,140
6.	Mueang Mo	เหมืองหม้อ	12	9,175
7.	Wang Thong	วังธง	5	2,527
8.	Mae Lai	แม่หล่าย	6	4,516
9.	Huai Ma	ห้วยม้า	14	6,509
10.	Pa Maet	ป่าแมต	14	12,177
11.	Ban Thin	บ้านถิ่น	8	6,566
12.	Suan Khuean	สวนเขื่อน	10	5,264
13.	Wang Hong	วังหงส์	7	3,185
14.	Mae Kham Mi	แม่คำมี	11	7,300
15.	Thung Kwao	ทุ่งกวาว	6	5,848
16.	Tha Kham	ท่าข้าม	5	2,376
17.	Mae Yom	แม่ยม	4	1,915
18.	Cho Hae	ช่อแฮ	10	6,833
19.	Rong Fong	ร่องฟอง	4	3,724
20.	Kanchana	กาญจนา	9	4,494

== Notable sites ==
The home of the former rulers of Phrae, built in 1892, is now used as the governor's residence and has been promoted as a tourist destination by the Phrae provincial government.
