= Phrae =

Phrae แพร่ ᨻᩯᩖ᩵
- Town
- เมืองแพร่ ᨾᩮᩬᩥᨦᨻᩯᩖ᩵
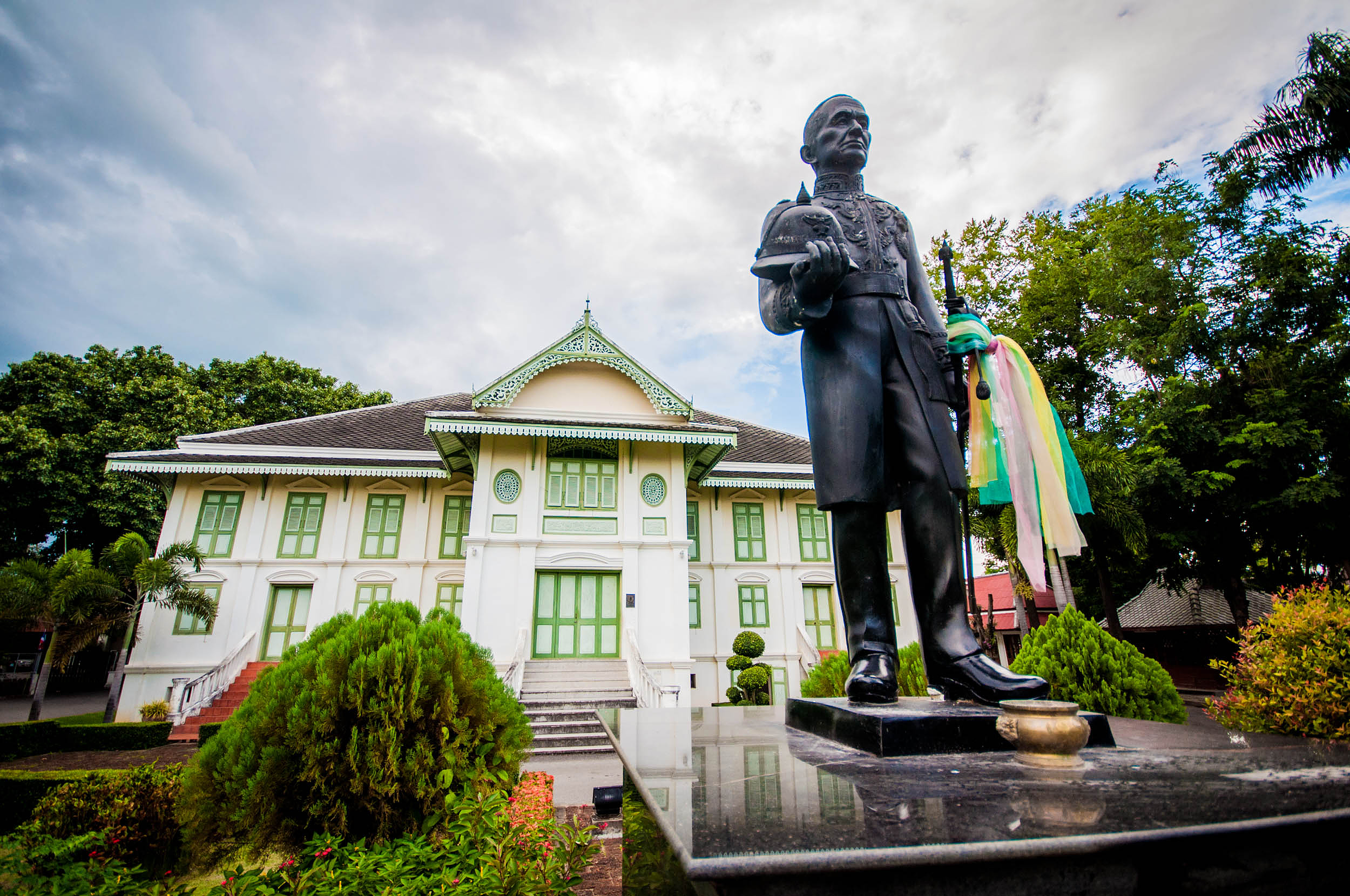
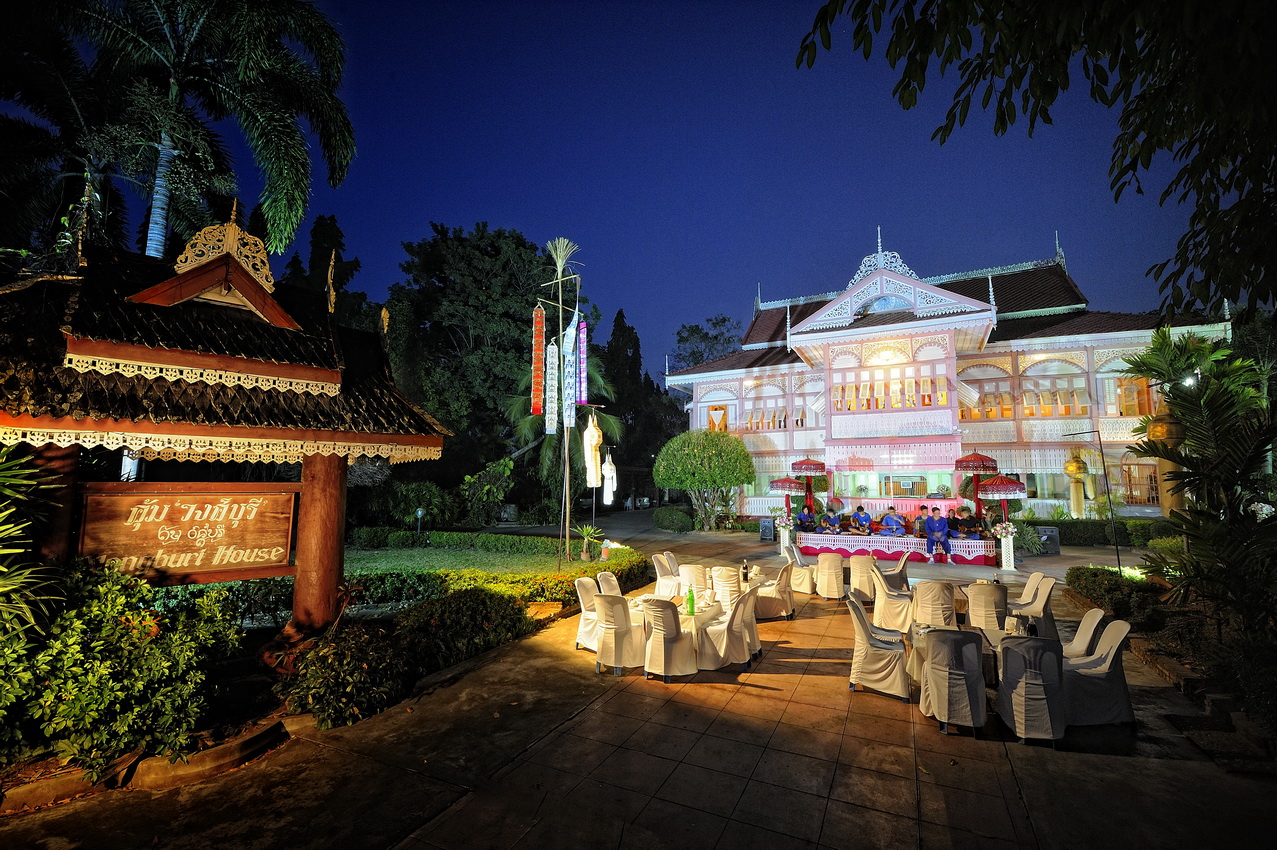
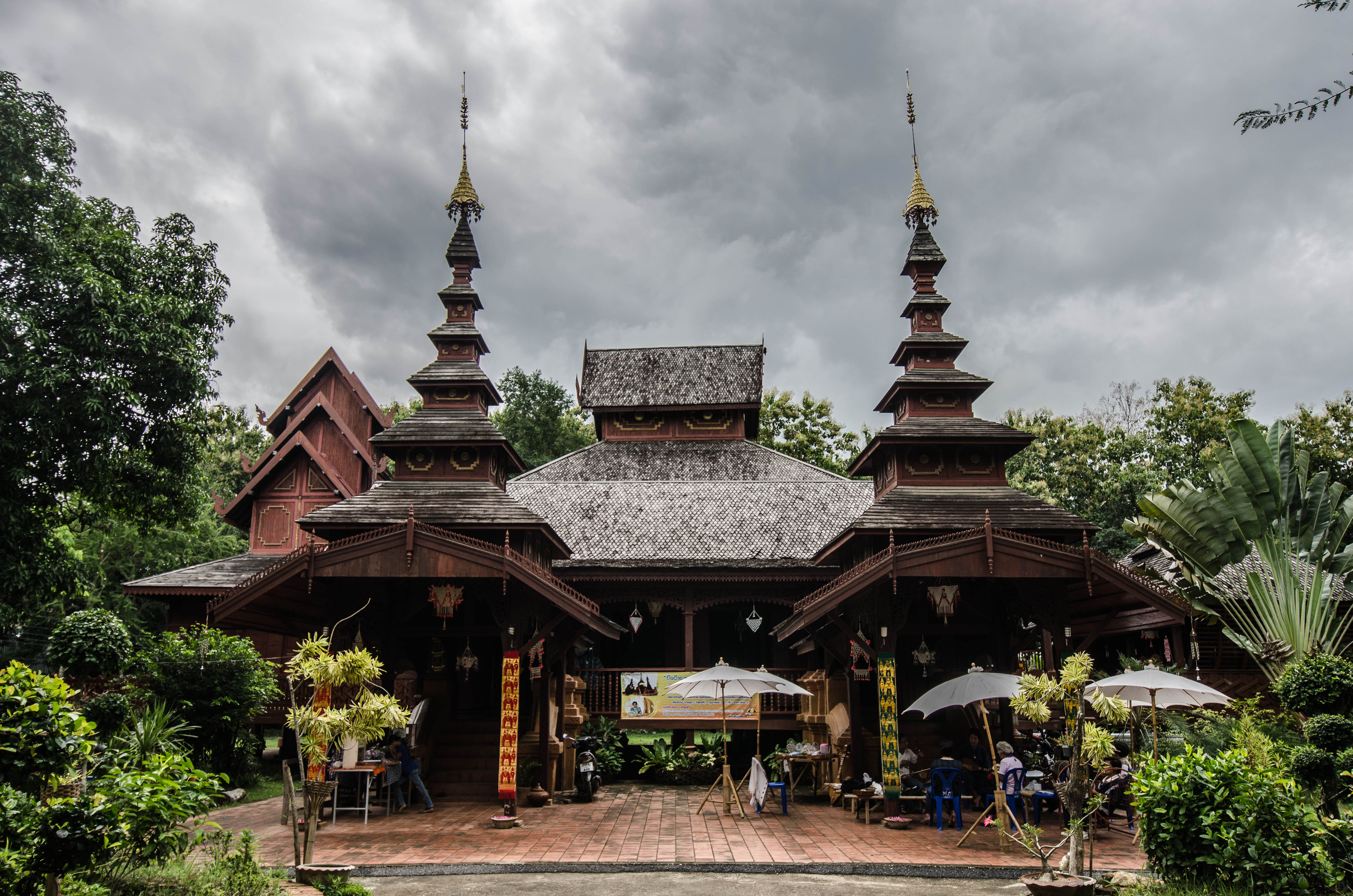
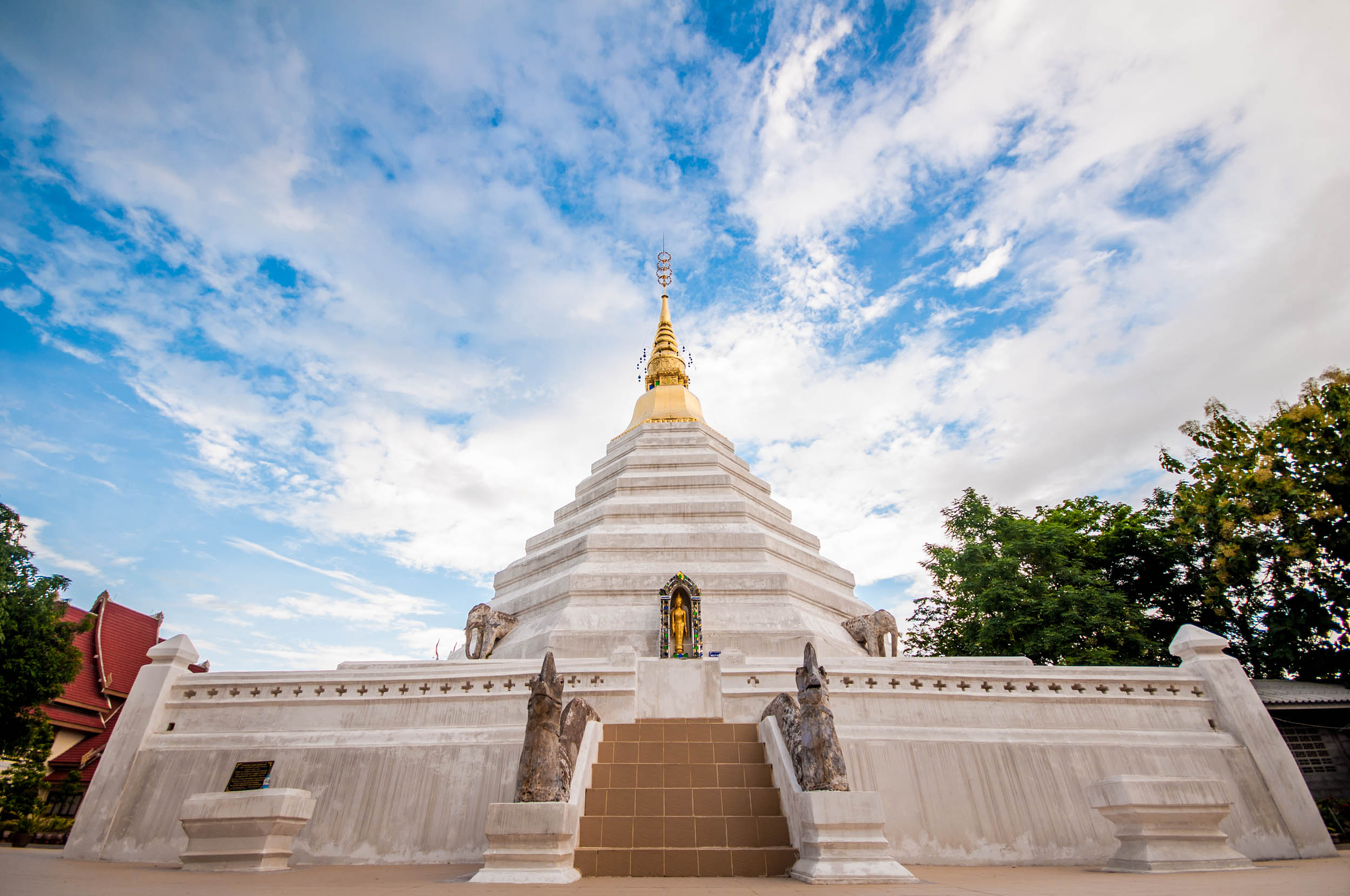
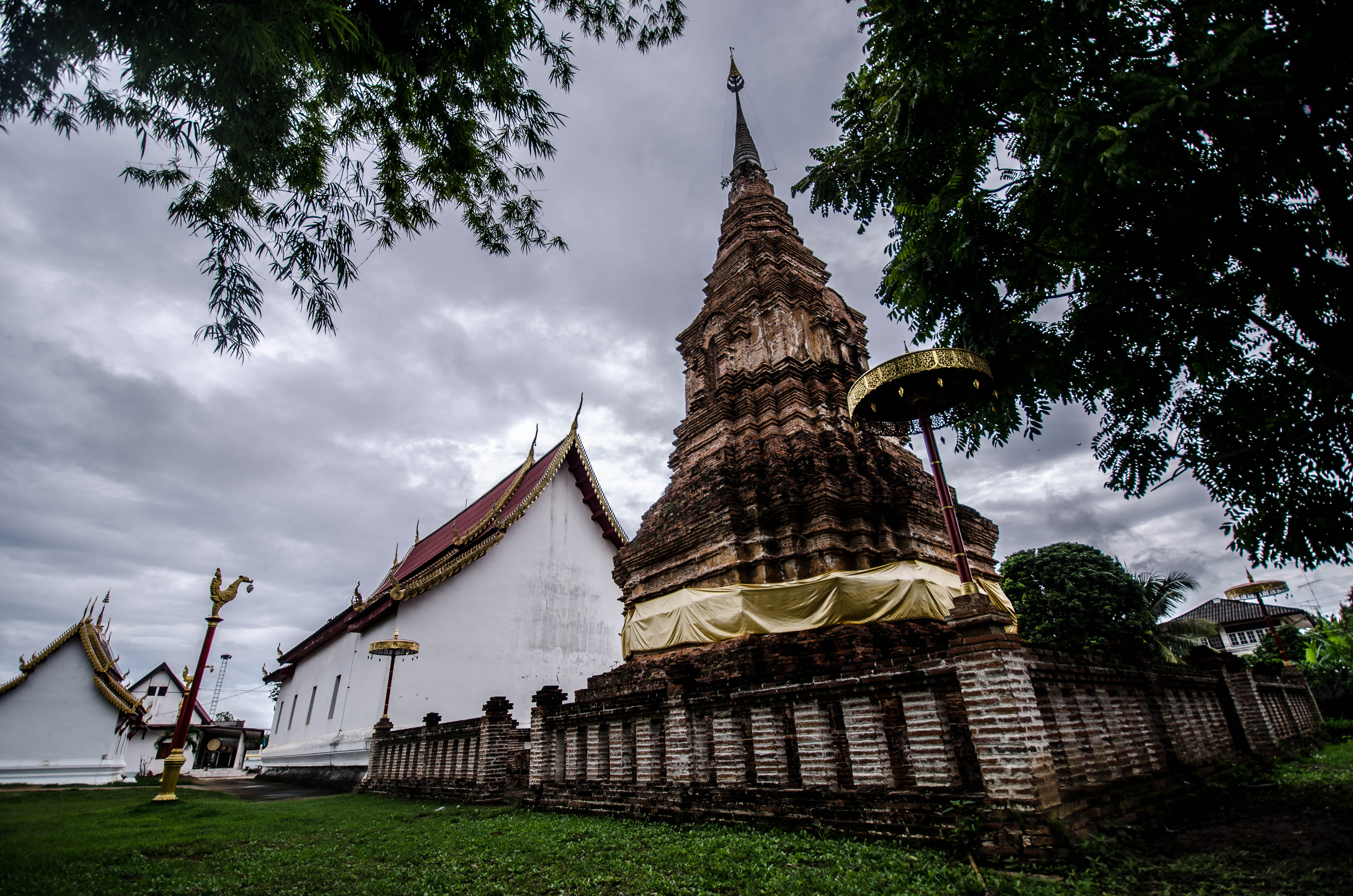

- Location within Thailand
- Coordinates: 18°8′43″N 100°8′31″E
- Country: Thailand
- Provinces: Phrae Province
- Amphoe: Mueang Phrae

Area
  - Total: 9 km^{2} (3.5 sq mi)
- Elevation: 159 m (522 ft)

Population (2019)
  - Total: 15,316
  - Density: 1,700/km^{2} (4,400/sq mi)
- Time zone: UTC+7 (ICT)
- Website: https://www.phraecity.go.th/event.php

Phrae (Northern Thai: ᨻᩯᩖ᩵; Thai: แพร่; pronounced [pʰrɛ̂ː]) is a town (thesaban mueang) and capital of Phrae Province and Mueang Phrae district. It is located in Northern Thailand on the east bank of the Yom river, 555 km north of Bangkok by road.

The town occupies tambon Nai Wiang of Mueang Phrae District and has an area of nine km^{2} with a population of 15,316 (2019). The town is known for its rich history, textile industry and temple architecture, as well as offering a blend of both Isan and Lan Na culture and cuisine.

The town was first established in 1371BE (828AD). During the late 19th century, Phrae served as a major centre for the teak trade, with numerous foreign companies operating around the town. Before centralisation reforms by King Chulalongkorn were untertakened, Phrae served as the capital of the Kingdom of Phrae and the seat of the royal family of Phrae. In 1902, the town served as the center for the Shan-led Ngiao rebellion, which aimed to overthrow Central Thai rule over Lan Na before being crushed. Central Thai authority over Phrae was reestablished on 16 August 1902.

== History ==
Phrae
- "Phrae" in Thai language (top) and Northern Thai with Tai Tham script (bottom)

Thai name
- Thai: แพร่
- RTGS: Phrae

Northern Thai name
- Northern Thai: ᨻᩯᩖ᩵ (Phae)

Phrae was constructed during the Early to Mid Hiran Ngoenyang and Haripunchai period. One of the earliest temples to be constructed in Phrae was Wat Phra That Cho Hae around 1336-1338 during the Sukhothai period. During the 16th century, the town served as an outpost controlled by the Kingdom of Lan Na.

=== 19th century and early 20th century ===
During the 19th century, the Northern Thailand experienced economic growth through the teak industry. Due to Phrae's location to numerous teak forests, the town become home to several foreign residences and companies that operated teak farms nearby, such as the East Asiatic company and the Bombay Burmah Trading Corporation. The East Asiatic company began logging in 1897 until it expired in 1936; while the Bombay Burmah was granted in 1889 a logging concession. Increased foreign presence of companies later led to an influx of foreign residences from different nations such as the United Kingdom, United States and Denmark. It also led to an influx of Christians and Christian missionaries, such as the American Presbyterian mission.

The last chao luang (king) of Phrae, Phiriya Theppawong, ascended the throne upon his father's death on 5 April 1889. In 1891, the former treasurer of Phrae constructed the Wichai Racha Residence, which would act as a safehouse during the Ngiao rebellion and World War II. In 1892, Khum Chao Luang was constructed as the royal residence of the chao luang. In 1897, Chinese architects from Guangzhou constructed a pink-white mansion made from teak which served as a wedding present for the king of Phrae to his stepdaughter. Also in the same year, in line with Chulalongkorn centralisation reforms, Bangkok appointed Phraya Chaiboon (Thongyuu Suwanbat) as the governor.

==== Ngiao Rebellion ====
On 25 July 1902, a group of Shan miners who previously ambushed Siamese police and soldiers, stormed the police station in Phrae led by Sala Po Chai and Phaka Mong. The rioters, now numbering around 300, stormed the governor's residence and forced the chao luang to aid the rebellion. They then went about killing ethnic Central Thai residences, including the governor Thongyuu. From 25 July to 16 August, the town remained under Shan control. However, military defeat to the Siamese army led to mass disorganisation and anarchy in the town after the death of their leaders. On August 5, Harold Lyle, the British vice-consul in Nan, moved into the former governor's residence in an attempt to restore order. He however delayed the Siamese and Danish armies from entering the town in fear that a massacre of local and foreign residences would occur. Finally on August 16, Pichai provincial police reclaimed the town before the main Siamese army led by Surasak Montri arrived on August 20. For his involvement in the rebellion, the chao luang went into exile in Luang Prabang and the Kingdom of Phrae was ended.

==== Modern History ====
During World War II after the Japanese invasion of Thailand and Thailand siding with the Japanese, members of the Free Thai movement operated in Phrae and used the Wichai Racha Residence as a safehouse.

Following the 2014 coup, the National Council for Peace and Order ceased all duties of Mayor Chokchai Phanomkwan on 25 June 2015. Prime-minister Prayut Chan-o-cha reinstated Chokchai's duties on 28 August 2020. Chokchai Phanomkwan was removed as mayor of Phrae due to corruption in delaying hotel taxes and parking fee collection on 25 January 2022.

== Geography ==
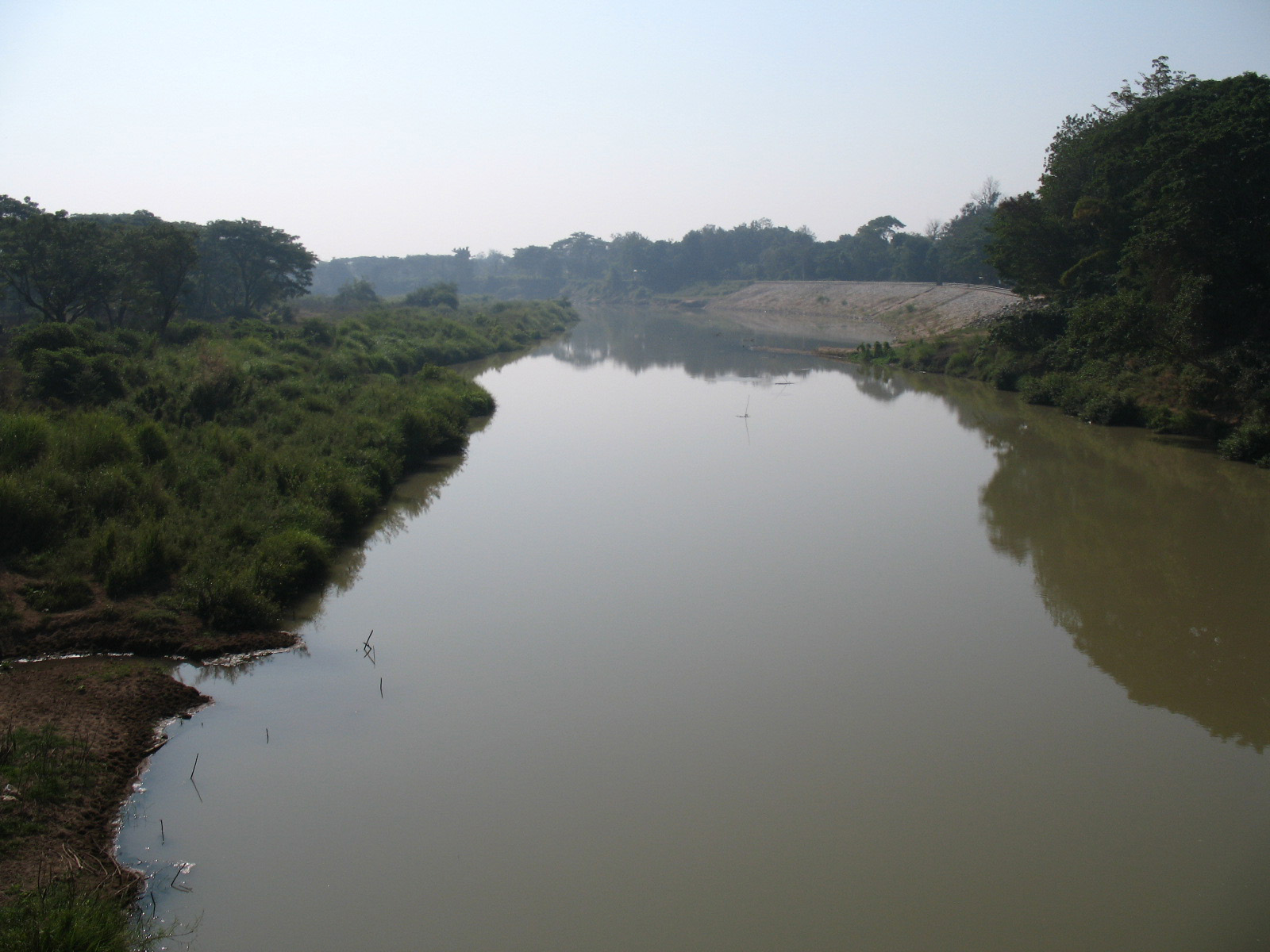
River, Phrae

Phrae lies on the Yom River, at an elevation of 159 metres (522 ft). The town is mostly built on the east side of the river, but some outlying parts are built on the west side of the river and are connected to the main part by bridges. There are hills both to the east and west of the town; the Phlueng Range to the east are higher, reaching about 800 metres (2,600 ft) above sea level, whereas the Phi Pan Nam Range to the west are about 500 metres (1,600 ft) above sea level.

At Phae Muang Phi, a few kilometres north of Phrae, there is a landscape of mushroom rocks and pillars shaped by natural erosive action.

== Demography ==
In 2005, Phrae had a population of 17,971. In 2019, it declined to 15,316 with females making up 53.4% of the population.

== Climate ==
Phrae has a tropical savanna climate (Köppen climate classification Aw). Winters are dry and warm. Temperatures rise until April, which is very hot with the average daily maximum at 37.6 °C (99.7 °F). The monsoon season runs from May through October, with heavy rain and somewhat cooler temperatures during the day, although nights remain warm.

Climate data for Phrae (1991–2020)
Month	Jan	Feb	Mar	Apr	May	Jun	Jul	Aug	Sep	Oct	Nov	Dec	Year
Record high °C (°F)	35.6 (96.1)	38.5 (101.3)	41.7 (107.1)	43.6 (110.5)	43.0 (109.4)	40.5 (104.9)	37.5 (99.5)	37.5 (99.5)	35.8 (96.4)	37.3 (99.1)	35.8 (96.4)	34.9 (94.8)	43.6 (110.5)
Mean daily maximum °C (°F)	31.2 (88.2)	33.7 (92.7)	36.3 (97.3)	37.6 (99.7)	35.6 (96.1)	33.9 (93.0)	32.7 (90.9)	32.2 (90.0)	32.5 (90.5)	32.4 (90.3)	31.8 (89.2)	30.5 (86.9)	33.4 (92.1)
Daily mean °C (°F)	22.6 (72.7)	24.6 (76.3)	27.9 (82.2)	30.1 (86.2)	29.3 (84.7)	28.5 (83.3)	27.9 (82.2)	27.4 (81.3)	27.4 (81.3)	26.7 (80.1)	24.9 (76.8)	22.5 (72.5)	26.7 (80.0)
Mean daily minimum °C (°F)	16.3 (61.3)	17.7 (63.9)	21.4 (70.5)	24.5 (76.1)	25.1 (77.2)	25.0 (77.0)	24.8 (76.6)	24.6 (76.3)	24.4 (75.9)	23.3 (73.9)	20.2 (68.4)	16.8 (62.2)	22.0 (71.6)
Record low °C (°F)	7.4 (45.3)	9.4 (48.9)	9.9 (49.8)	16.0 (60.8)	18.8 (65.8)	20.0 (68.0)	20.0 (68.0)	20.5 (68.9)	18.5 (65.3)	14.6 (58.3)	9.2 (48.6)	5.0 (41.0)	5.0 (41.0)
Average precipitation mm (inches)	13.4 (0.53)	11.7 (0.46)	31.8 (1.25)	82.5 (3.25)	171.4 (6.75)	141.9 (5.59)	179.9 (7.08)	239.0 (9.41)	187.7 (7.39)	79.3 (3.12)	22.7 (0.89)	10.8 (0.43)	1,172.1 (46.15)
Average precipitation days (≥ 1.0 mm)	1.2	0.9	2.6	5.2	11.9	12.0	14.2	16.5	14.0	7.1	2.1	0.8	88.5
Average relative humidity (%)	74.0	68.1	63.3	64.5	73.8	78.2	80.8	83.8	84.4	82.7	78.5	75.8	75.7
Mean monthly sunshine hours	257.3	243.0	238.7	204.0	198.4	117.0	120.9	117.8	144.0	182.9	216.0	220.1	2,260.1
Mean daily sunshine hours	8.3	8.6	7.7	6.8	6.4	3.9	3.9	3.8	4.8	5.9	7.2	7.1	6.2
Source 1: World Meteorological Organization
Source 2: Office of Water Management and Hydrology, Royal Irrigation Department (sun 1981–2010)(extremes)

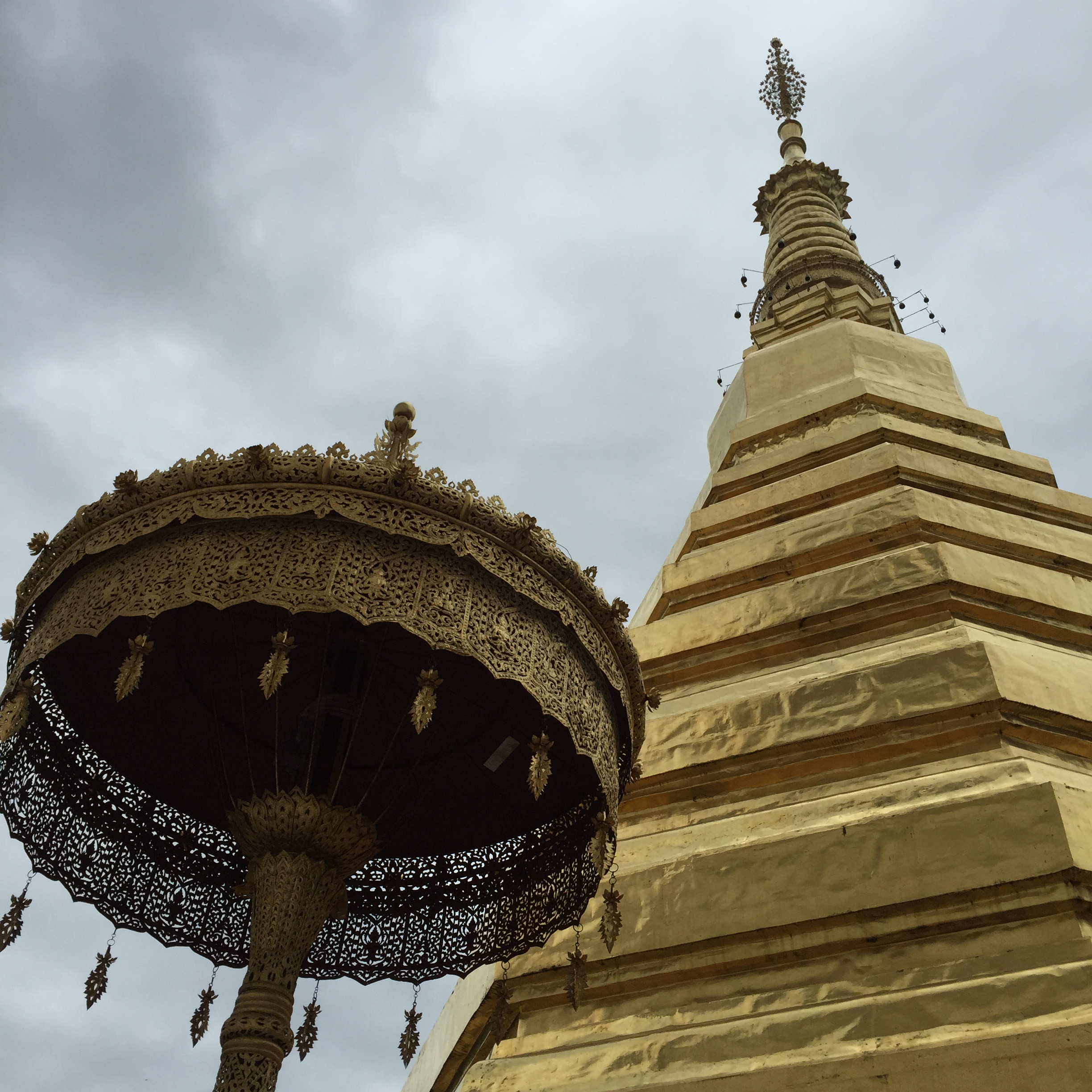
Wat Phrathat Cho Hae in 2015

== Culture ==
Phrae is home to many notable Buddhist temples, including Wat Phrathat Cho Hae, Wat Pongsunan (Temple of the Tortoise), Wat Chorm Sawan, Khum Chao Luang, and Wat Phra That Cho Hae.

The latter is on a hill, nine km away from the town center. During the 1800s, two teak bungalows were built by Christians in place of churches and are still present in the town.

== Mayors ==
Name (Birth–Death)	Term of office		
Name (Birth–Death)	Took office	Left office	Time in office
Grain Prachasaraisorndejเกรน ประชาศรัยสรเดช (1919-1978)	1951	1962	11 years
Worawat Euapinyakul วรวัจน์ เอื้ออภิญญกุล (1959)	1990		
Chokchai Phanomkwanโชคชัย พนมขวัญ	2008	January 25, 2022	14 years

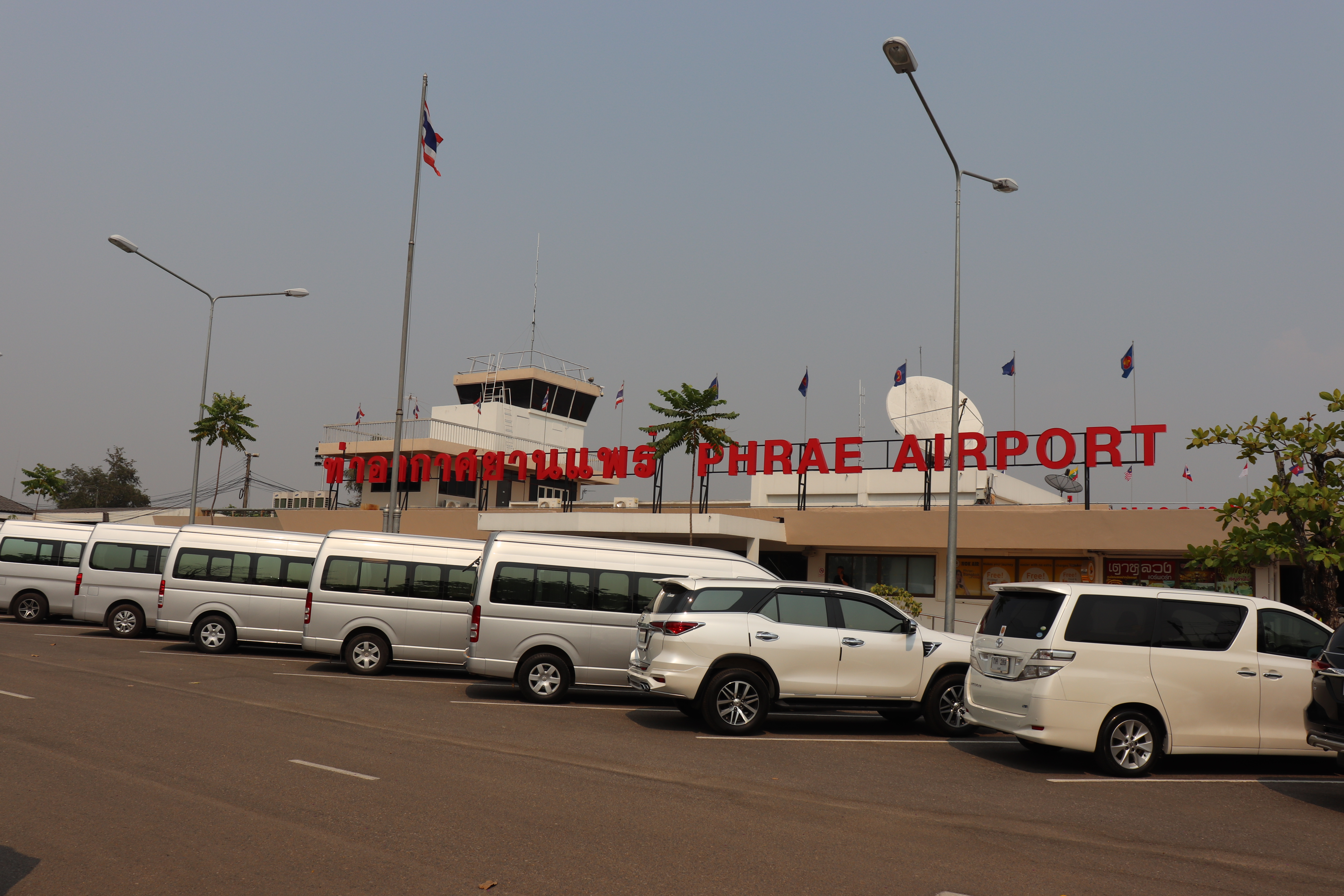
Phrae Airport

== Transportation ==
The main road through Phrae is Route 101, which begins in Nan to the north, passes through Phrae, and leads to Sawankhalok, Sukhothai, and finally Kamphaeng Phet. The town is served by Phrae Airport, a small airport in Mueang Mo, on the east side of town. It handles only domestic flights from and to Don Mueang (DMK) by Nok Air.
