= Thawi Wanarom Park =

Park in Bangkok, Thailand

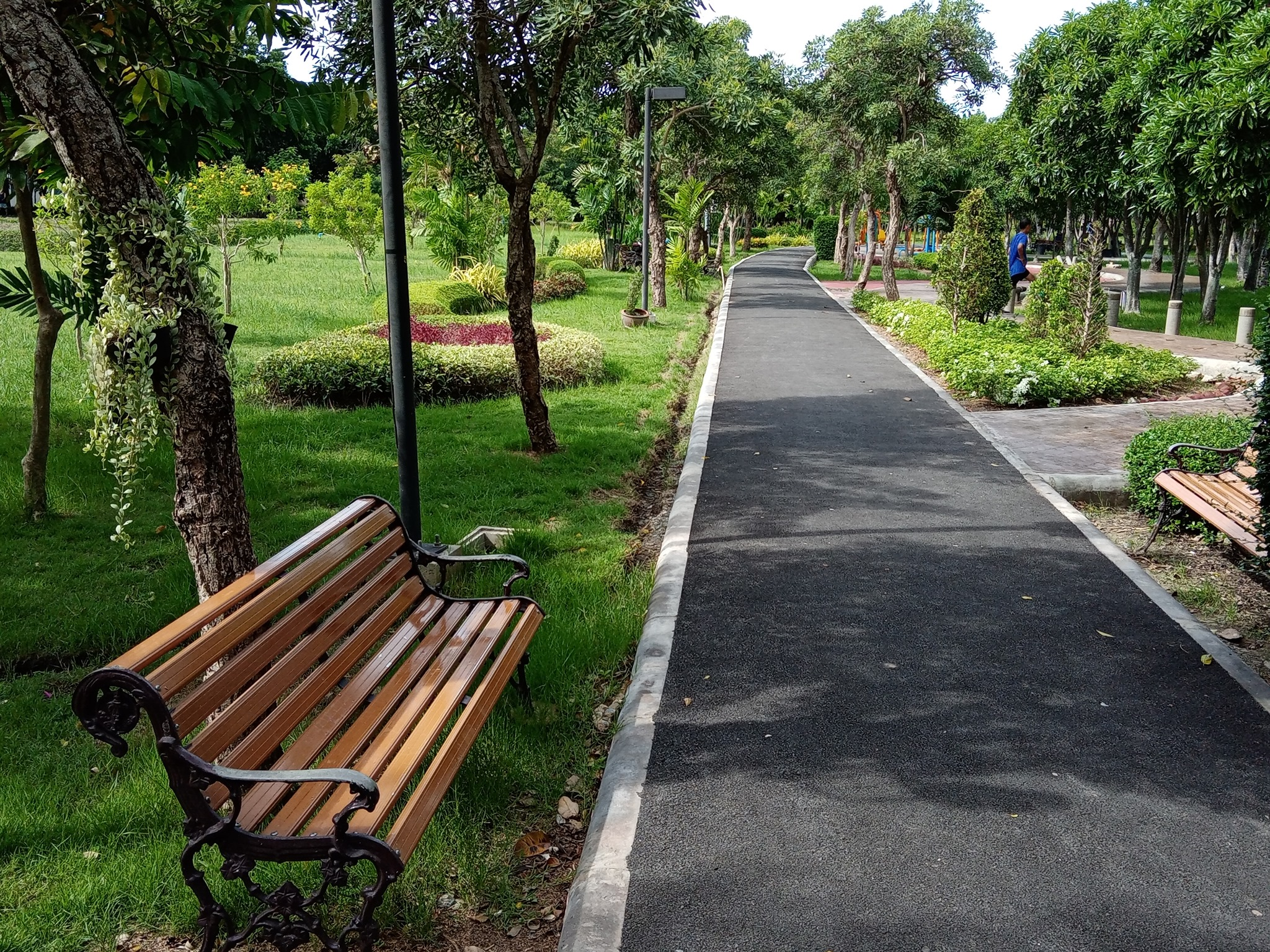
- Bench and jogging track
- Interactive map of Thawi Wanarom Park
- Type: Public park
- Location: Thawi Watthana, Thawi Watthana, Bangkok
- Coordinates: 13°44′37.22″N 100°21′8.59″E
- Area: 23.7 acres (9.6 ha)
- Created: 2005
- Operator: Bangkok Metropolitan Administration (BMA)
- Status: Open daily from 5:00 am to 9:00 pm
- Public transit: BMTA bus lines 91ก, 4-57; local minibus

Thawi Wanarom Park (Thai: สวนทวีวนารมย์, pronounced [sǔan tʰā.wīː wā.nāː.rōm]) is a small public park in western suburb Bangkok.

== History ==
The park area has been rented from Botanical Gardens Bangkok Ltd., in a land of 17.6 hectares with 30 year-contract and 100 baht net rental fee.

Bangkok Metropolitan Administration (BMA) made the contract and registered the land in February 2002. The land development was processed by the Department of Environment where the land was divided in two sections. The first phase (6.4 hectares) was modified to a public park, and the rest (2.56 hectares) was prepared for the market administration office and IT centre.

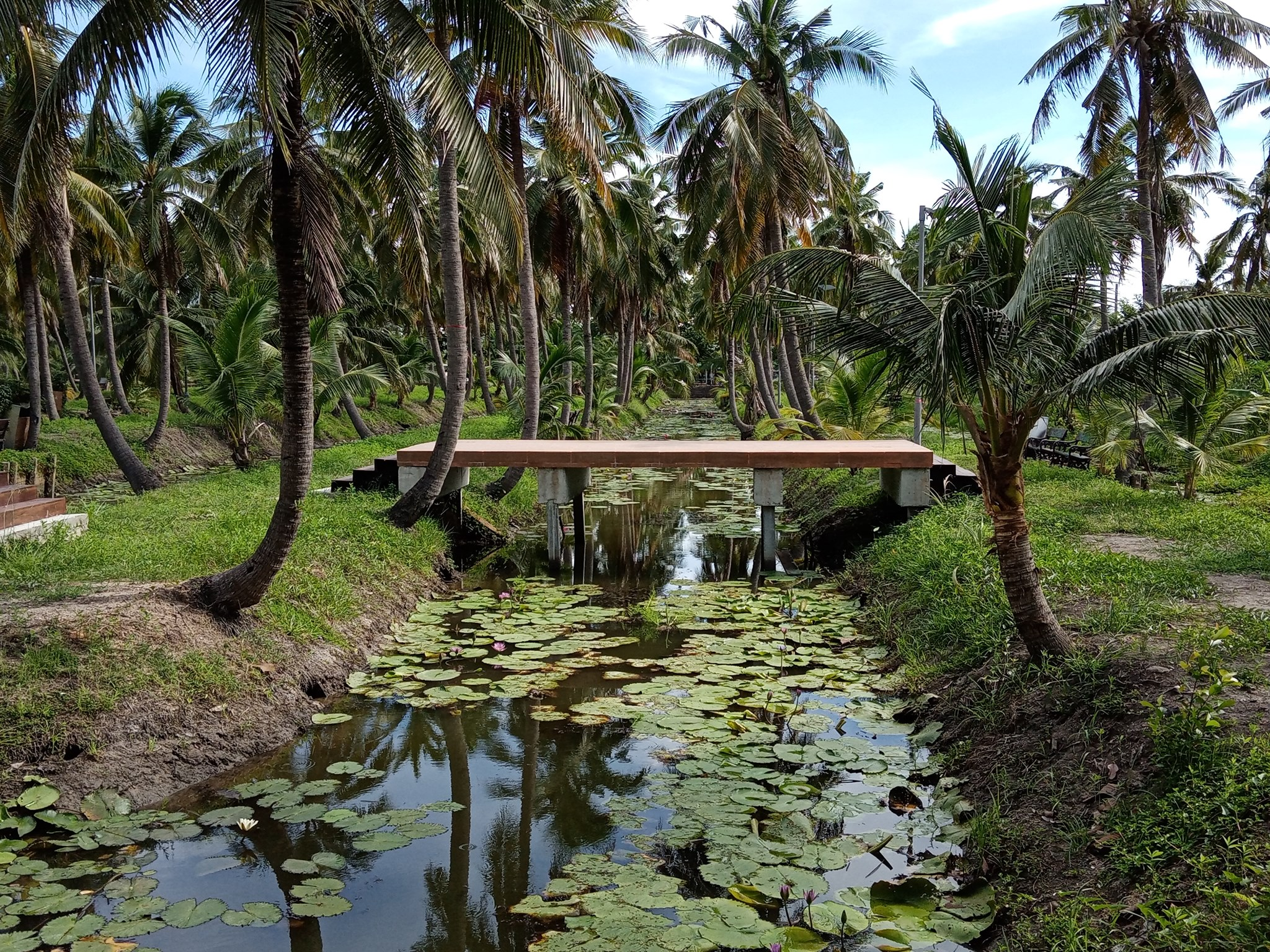
Coconut garden and the gutters

The park was inaugurated on October 29, 2005, with then governor of Bangkok Apirak Kosayothin presiding over the launching ceremony.

Its name Thawi Wanarom literally meaning "the delights of Thawi Watthana".

== Park components ==
The park is located nearby Thonburi Market, also colloquially known as Sanam Luang II, a weekend massive flea market, and people are attracted to visit the park after shopping in the market.

Coconut garden was designed by maintaining the original style and installing benches, a pedestrian way and small bridges crossing gutters.

Also, the residual other area was developed for exercising and recreational activities, consisting of multi-purpose ground, playground, health plaza, basketball court, walking and jogging tracks.
