= Thonburi Market =

Outdoor market in Bangkok, Thailand

Coordinates: 13°44′46.05″N 100°21′8.44″E

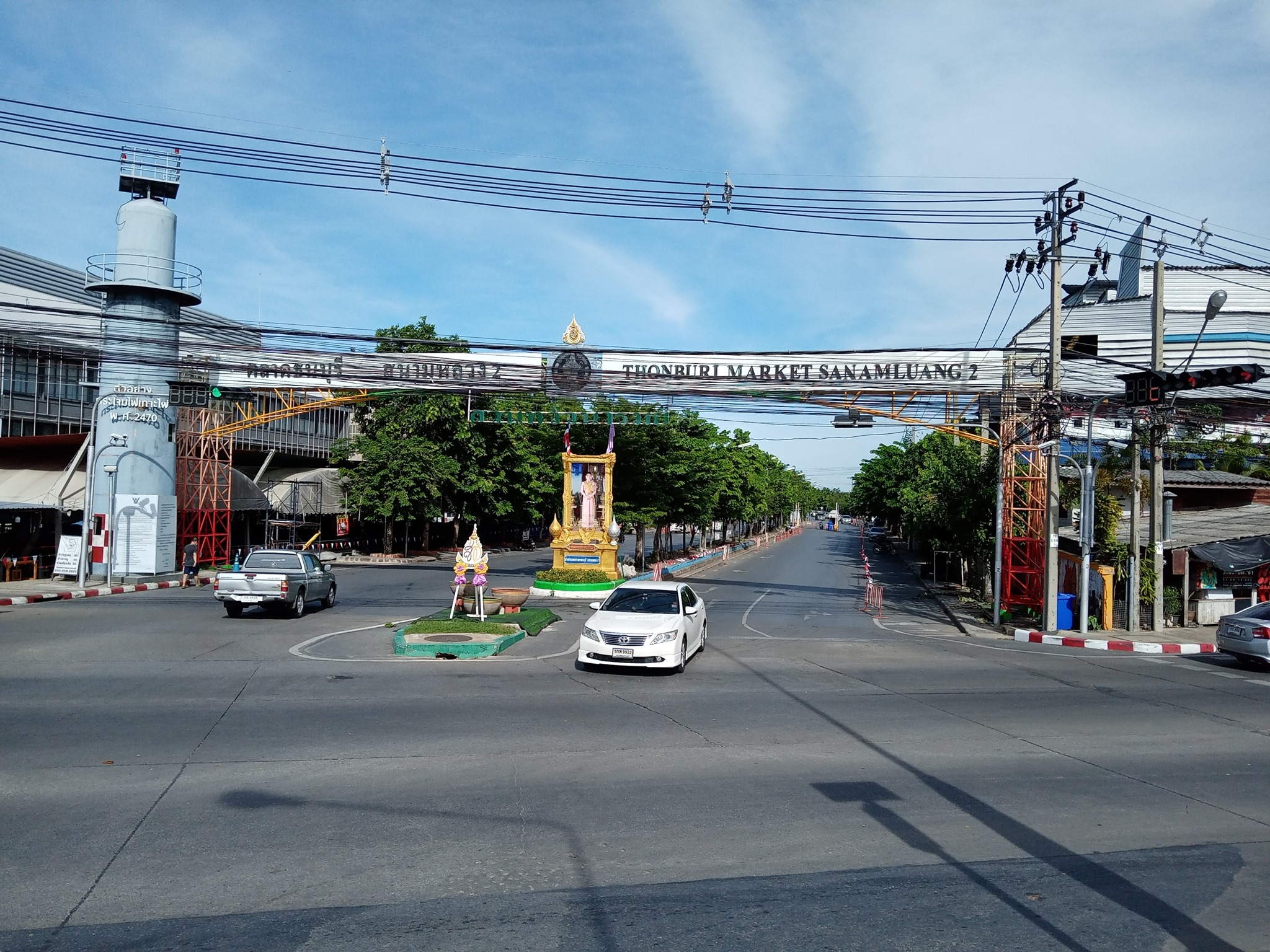
Entrance of the market

Thonburi Market (Thai: ตลาดธนบุรี, RTGS: Talat Thon Buri, pronounced [tā.làːt tʰōn bū.rīː]), also informally and colloquially known as Sanam Luang Song (สนามหลวง 2, [sā.nǎːm lǔaŋ sɔ̌ːŋ]), is a market in Thailand. Located at 195/1, Mu 1 Thawi Watthana Road (formerly named Liap Khlong Thawi Wattana Road), Thawi Watthana Subdistrict, Thawi Watthana District, Bangkok 10170. It's the largest market in Thonburi side.

== History & facility ==
Thonburi Market has been open since 2000, by Bangkok Metropolitan Administration has policy is to build a new public park and market in the Thonburi area like Chatuchak Weekend Market of Phra Nakhon side. In the first phase, available for weekends only. Until in 2002, Samak Sundaravej was the governor of Bangkok extend the available as daily and was officially named Thonburi Market as it's today.

Thonburi Market has 110 rai of land (about 43 acres), divided into 60 rai of public park and 40 rai of market with 10 rai of entrance. Thonburi Market sells many different kinds of goods, including plants, antiques, second-hand goods, pets, food and drinks, fresh and dry food, fashion clothing, ceramics, amulets, furniture and home accessories etc. Especially plants, it's considered as the largest orchid trade centre in Thailand, including ornamental fish. It's divided into 11 sections.

On February 5, 2012, there was an opening Talat Ratpracha Market, an indoor air-conditioned mall, part of the market to cater to traders who suffered from the catastrophic floods in previous years. Currently closed in 2021.

Based on 2002 data only weekends. There're about 2,500 cars a day.

== Neighbourhoods ==
Thonburi market is a market that characteristic not other market. Because nearby is a coconut garden flanked by a water-furrows. And also located in Thawi Watthana District, which is the suburb Bangkok as a district that is known as bestest atmosphere. So, this market is suitable for people who like to take a stroll, exercise and relax.

- Thawi Wanarom Park: It's an area of Thonburi Market, a 60-rai public park that was officially opened in 2005 by Apirak Kosayothin while governor of Bangkok.
- Khlong Thawi Watthana: One of the main khlong (คลอง, canal in Thai) in the Thonburi area of Bangkok.
- Talat World Market: Adjoining evening and night market, centre of vegetables, fruits, fresh food, seafood, food court and many more.
- Bangkokthonburi University: The private higher education institution.
- Wat Sala Daeng: An old temple built in 1876.
- Utthayan Avenue or usually known as Axis Avenue: One road adjacent to Phutthamonthon. It's nearly 4 km (about 2.4 mi) long, and is recognized as the most beautiful road in Thailand.
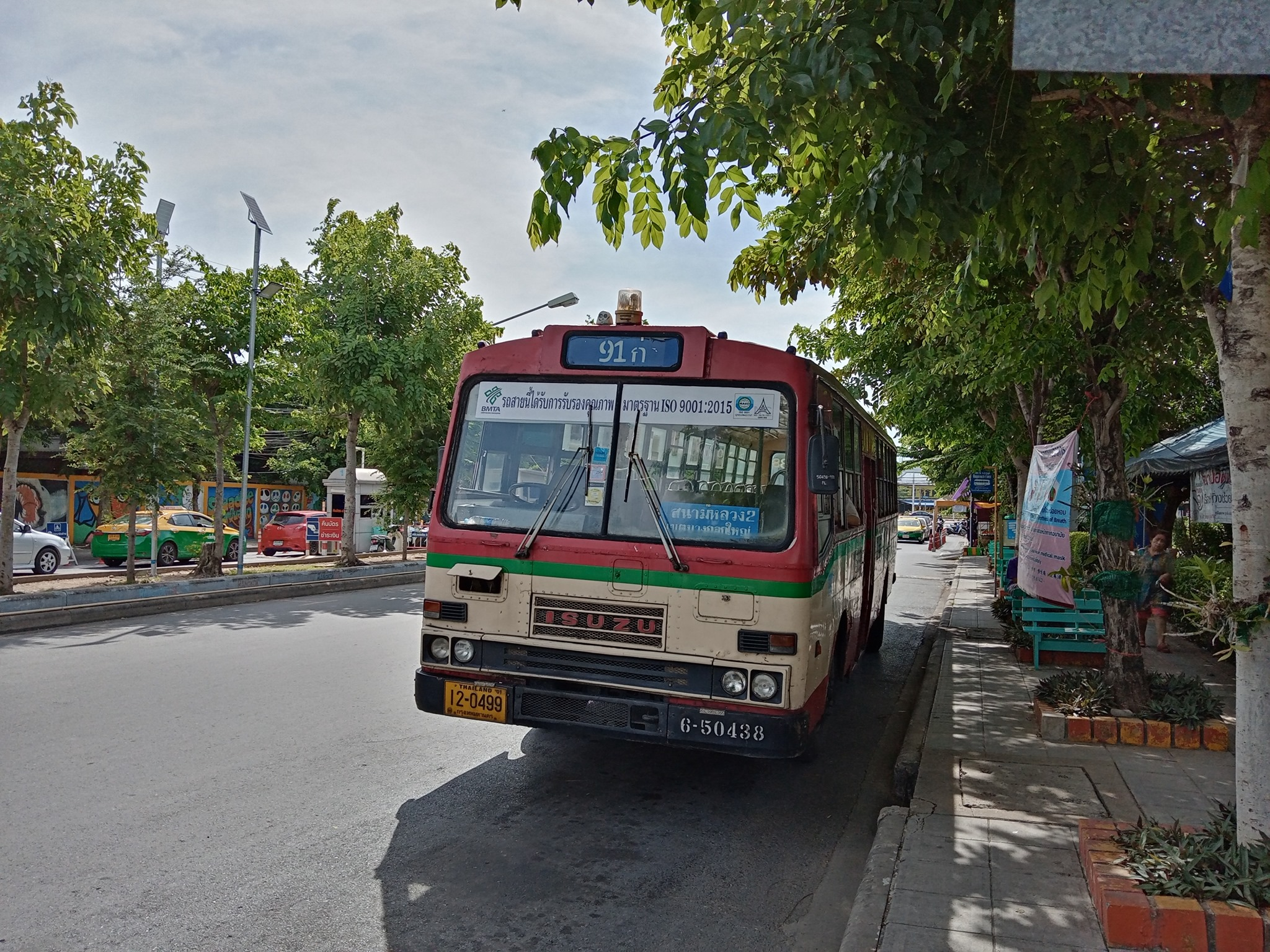
  Terminal of 91ก line
- Thawi Watthana Palace: Maha Vajiralongkorn's residence, the present king of Thailand.
- Phutthamonthon: The spacious Buddhist park in the Amphoe Phutthamonthon, Nakhon Pathom province, west of Bangkok. Its landmark is the large walking Buddha statue posture.

== Transportation ==
- BMTA bus: routes 91ก and 4-57
- Songthaew (Thai minibus style) from Bang Khae Fresh Market
