= Thawi Watthana (disambiguation) =

Thawi Watthana may refer to:

- Thawi Watthana district in Bangkok, Thailand
  - Thawi Watthana subdistrict, Bangkok, in the district
- Thawi Watthana subdistrict, Nonthaburi
- Khlong Thawi Watthana, a canal which runs through the area
