= Thawi Watthana subdistrict, Bangkok =

Sub-district in Bangkok, Thailand

Coordinates: 13°46′23.0″N 100°21′11.0″E

Thawi Watthana ทวีวัฒนา
- Khwaeng
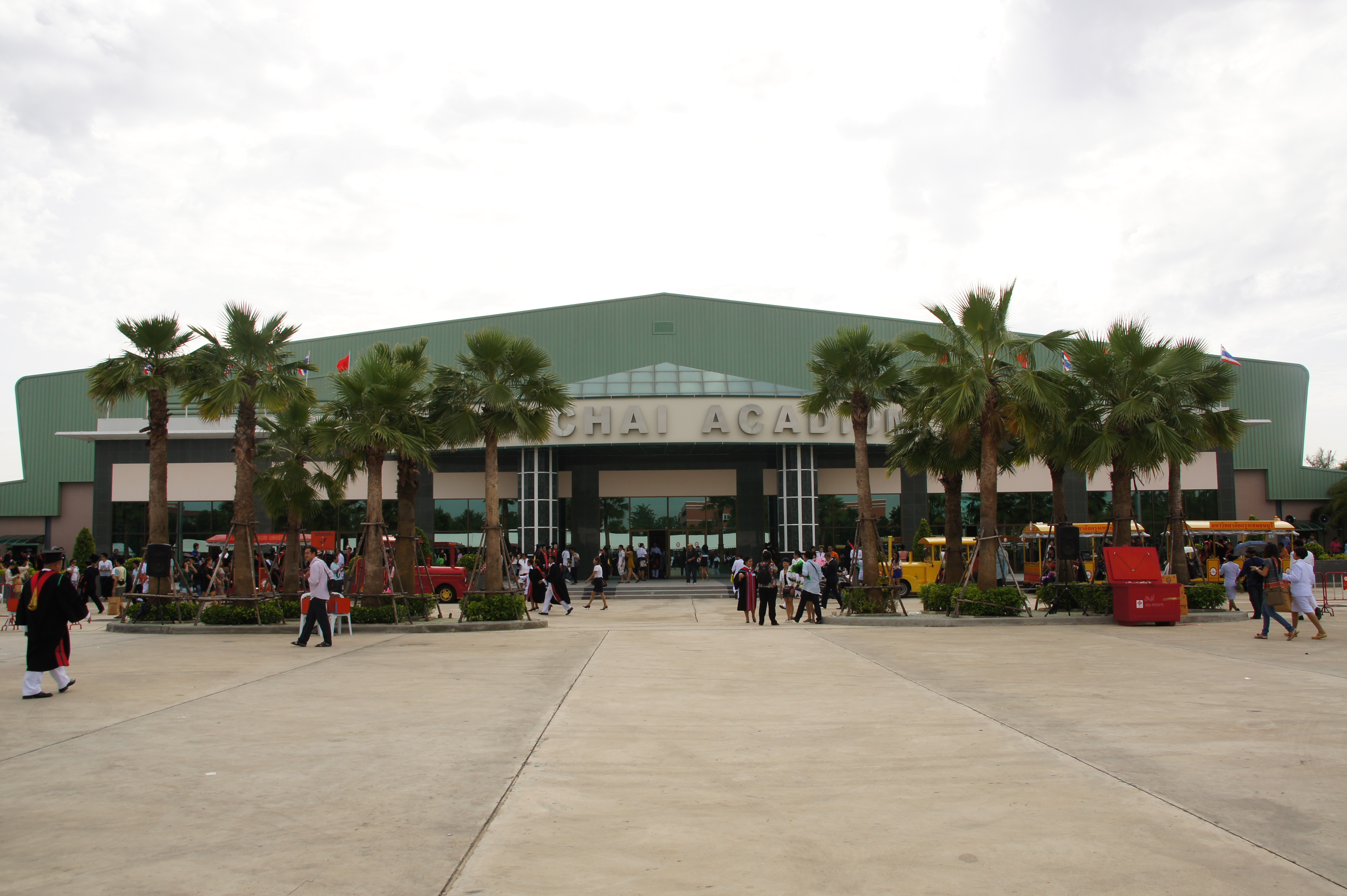
- Façade of Chanchai Acadium, the indoor stadium within Bangkokthonburi University

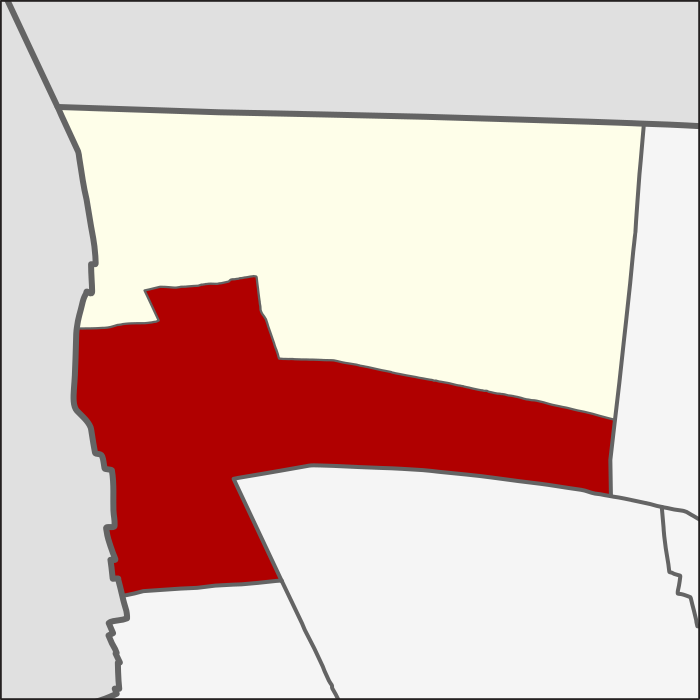
- Location in Thawi Watthana District
- Country: Thailand
- Province: Bangkok
- Khet: Thawi Watthana

Area
  - Total: 21.521 km^{2} (8.309 sq mi)

Population (2020)
  - Total: 23,159
- Time zone: UTC+7 (ICT)
- Postal code: 10170
- TIS 1099: 104801

Thawi Watthana (Thai: ทวีวัฒนา, pronounced [tʰā.wīː wát.tʰā.nāː]) is one of the two khwaengs (sub-districts) of Thawi Watthana District, Bangkok's Thonburi side, apart from Sala Thammasop. In 2015 it had a population of 22,552 people, with total area of 21.521 km^{2} (8.3093 mi^{2}). It is the location of the district office, and can be considered as the southern part of the district.

== Geography ==
Neighboring sub-districts are (from north clockwise) Sala Thammasop, Bang Phrom and Bang Chueak Nang of Taling Chan District, Bang Phai of Bang Khae and Nong Khang Phlu of Nong Khaem Districts, Salaya of Phutthamonthon and Krathum Lom of Sam Phran Districts, Nakhon Pathom Province.

Like the Sala Thammasop, it can be considered as the agricultural zone with a good atmosphere and fresh air, because it is a suburb Bangkok.

== History ==
It is named after Khlong Thawi Watthana, that flows through the area. Originally, it was a tambon, part of Amphoe Taling Chan of Thon Buri Province. Until new zoning was organized on March 6, 1998, Thawi Watthana therefore promoted to district and sub-district until now.

== Places ==
- Thonburi Market or Sanam Luang II
- Thawi Wanarom Park
- Bangkokthonburi University
- Rajdamnern Sport Complex
- Thawi Watthana Palace
- Utthayan Avenue
