= Utthayan Road =

Street in Bangkok, Thailand

Coordinates: 13°46′41.49″N 100°20′51.91″E

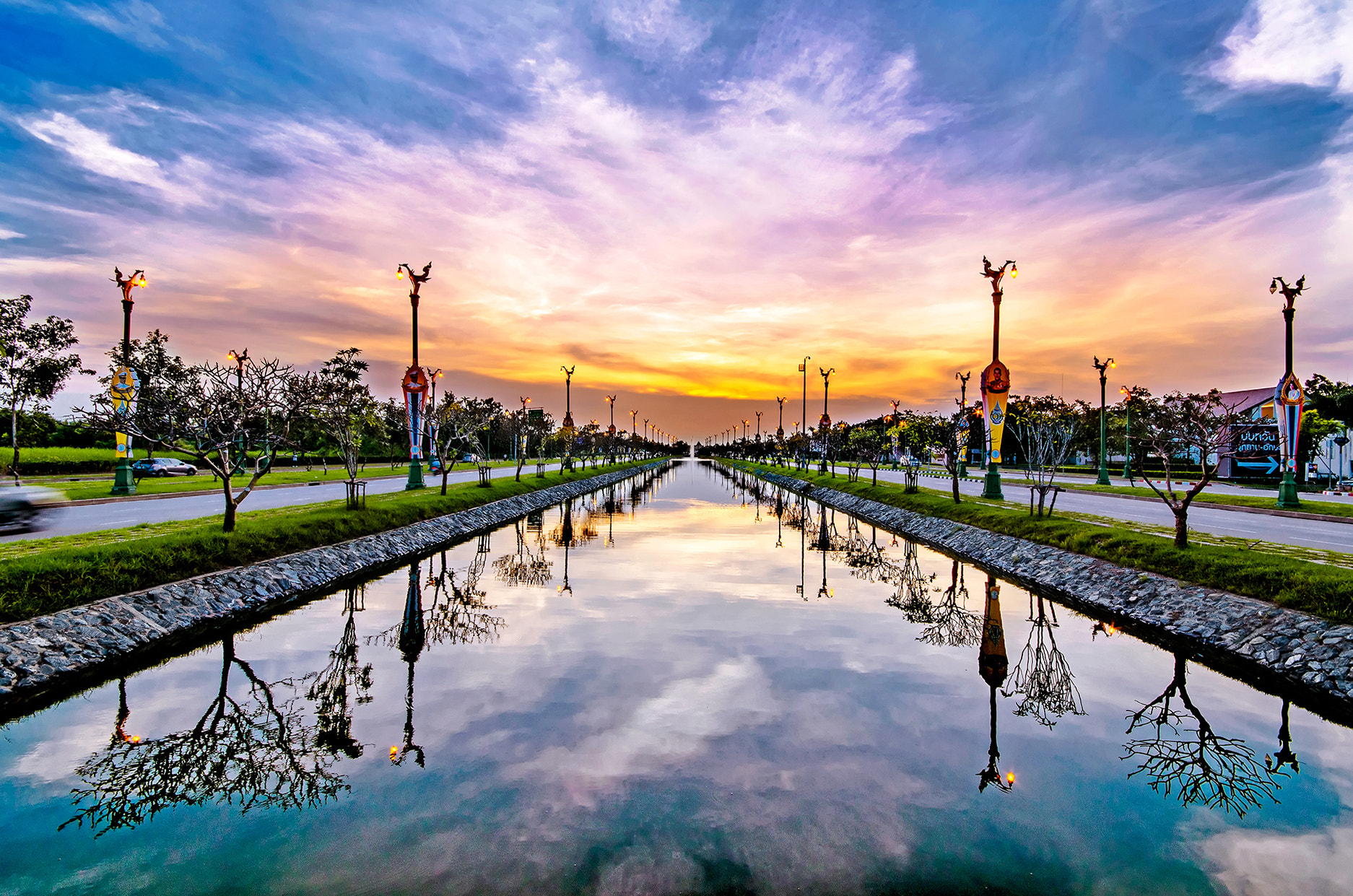
Utthayan Road in 2013.

Utthayan Road (Thai: ถนนอุทยาน, pronounced [tʰā.nǒn ʔùt.tʰā.jāːn]), formerly and still colloquially known as Aksa Road (ถนนอักษะ, [tʰā.nǒn ʔàk.sàʔ]), is a road in Bangkok, which is popularly regarded as the most beautiful road in Thailand. It is a broad avenue in western Bangkok's suburban Thawi Watthana District, and leads to the Buddhist park of Phutthamonthon in the adjacent Phutthamonthon District of Nakhon Pathom Province. It has been maintained by the Public Works Department, Bangkok Metropolitan Administration (BMA).

The road, 90 metres (300 ft) in width, runs a short distance of 3.86 kilometres (2.40 mi), divided into approximately 300 metres (980 ft) in Nakhon Pathom Province and about 3,500 metres (11,500 ft) in Bangkok. It is extensively landscaped with 979 hamsa (mythological swan) lampposts, 18-metre (59 ft)-wide lotus-ponds in the central traffic island and three fountains. It serves as a link between Phuttamonthon Sai 3 and Phutthamonthon Sai 4 roads, and runs parallel between the nearby Phetkasem and Borommaratchachonnani roads.

The road was conceived during the premiership of Field Marshal Plaek Phibunsongkhram as part of the Phutthamonthon project, which would commemorate the Buddhist year 2500 in 1957. Construction of the park began in 1955, but was halted when the Phibunsongkhram government was toppled in 1957. Construction of the park resumed and was completed in the 1980s, and the road was built during the government of Banharn Silpa-archa, to celebrate King Bhumibol Adulyadej's Golden Jubilee in 1996. The road was officially opened on 27 February 1999. Costing over one billion baht, it is also the most expensive road in the country.

The original name of the road, Aksa, was derived from the Thai name for the Axis powers of World War II, which Thailand joined under Phibunsongkhram's government. The name was chosen to convey that the road served as an axis linking Phutthamonthon 3 and 4 roads. Its official name, which means "park", was later bestowed by King Bhumibol.

The road is a popular location for photography, as well as road cycling and the annual Songkran festival. However, all Songkran activities were forbidden by Bangkok due to safety concerns in 2017. The road was also used as the site of political demonstrations by the United Front for Democracy Against Dictatorship during the 2013–2014 political crisis.
