= Songthaew =

Type of passenger vehicle

A city songthaew in Udon Thani, Thailand

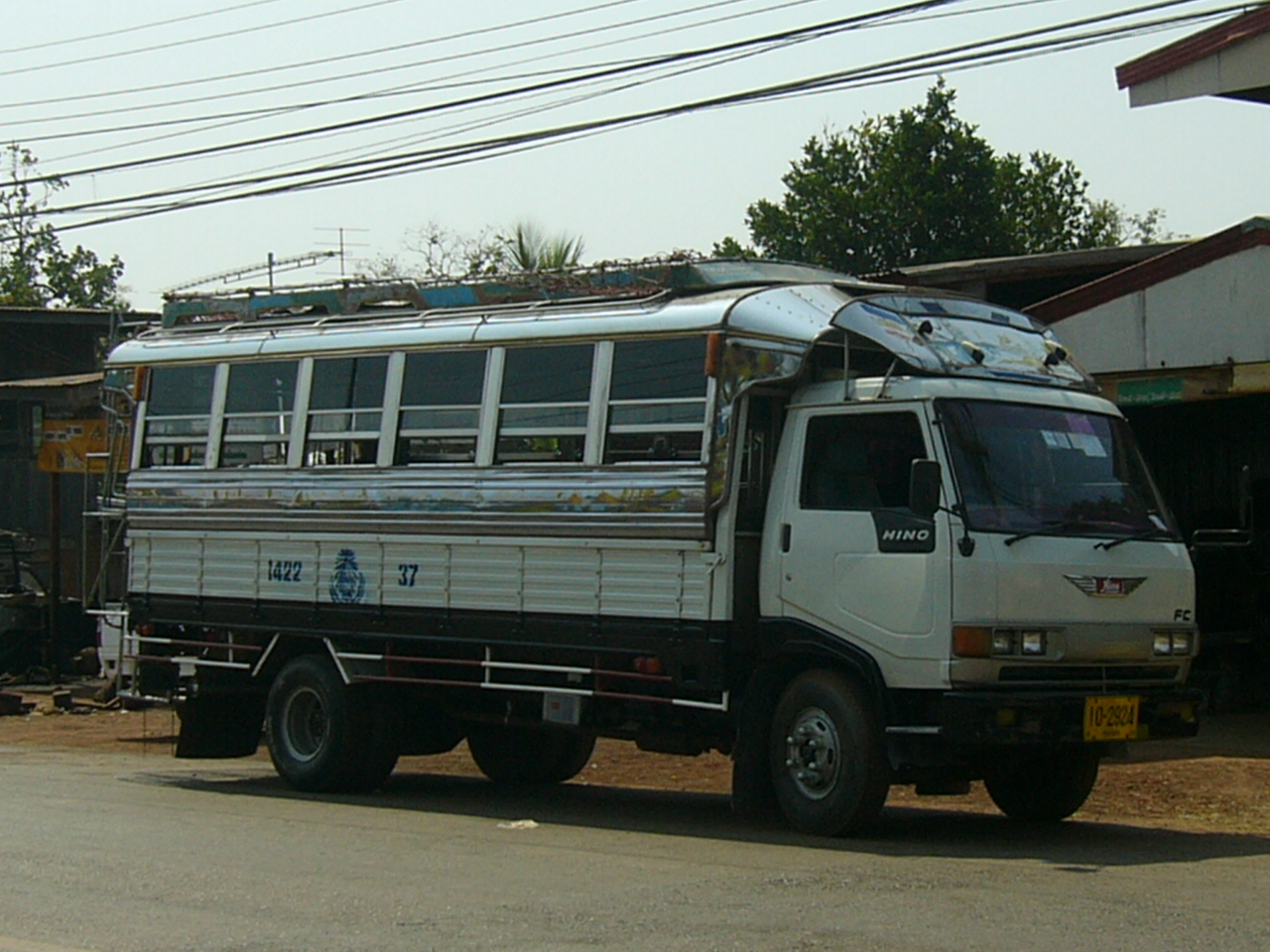
Hino Songthaew in Sakon Nakhon, Thailand (truck bus)

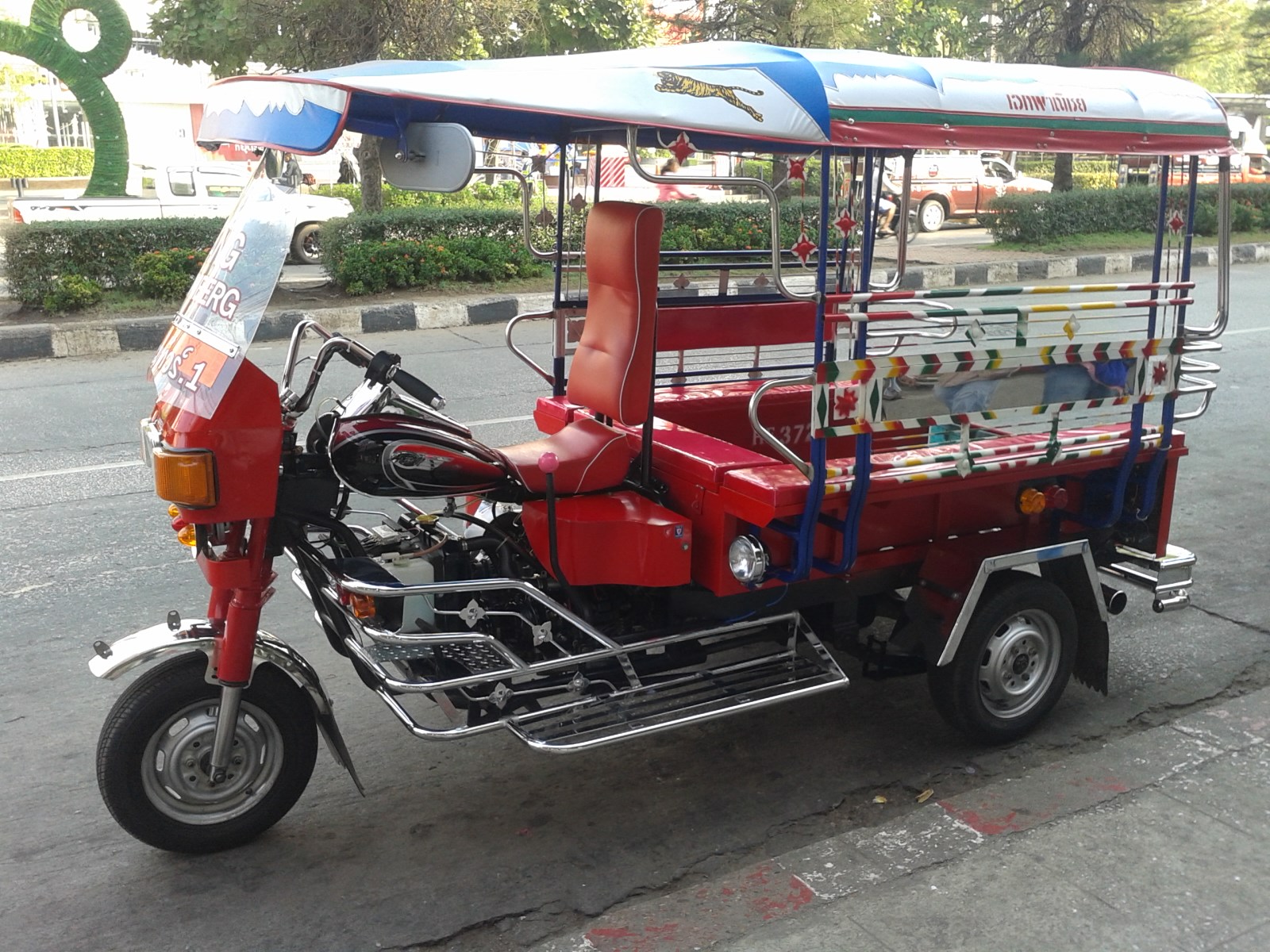
Technically, this tuk-tuk style is also a 2-row, in Udon Thani, though powered by a motorcycle engine.

A songthaew (Thai: สองแถว, lit. 'two rows', RTGS: songthaeo, pronounced [sɔ̌ːŋ.tʰɛ̌w]; Lao: ສອງແຖວ, pronounced [sɔ̌ːŋ.tʰɛ́w]; Malay: dua baris) is a passenger vehicle in Thailand, Laos, Cambodia and Myanmar adapted from a pick-up or a larger truck and used as a share taxi or bus.

== Overview ==
The songthaew takes its name from the two bench seats fixed along either side of the back of the truck. In some vehicles, a third bench is put down the middle of the seating area. Additionally a roof is fitted over the rear of the vehicle, to which curtains and plastic sheeting to keep out rain may be attached. Some vehicles have roofs high enough to accommodate standing passengers within the vehicle. More typically, standing passengers occupy a platform attached to the rear.

In Chiang Mai and its surroundings, locals may call them rot si daeng (Thai: รถสีแดง, literally "red car" — a reference to their most common colour in the area), rot daeng, or sometimes si rot.

The Isuzu Faster and Toyota Hilux are example models of songthaews found in Thailand.

In addition, some models of songthaews — such as Daihatsu Hijet, Subaru Sambar and Suzuki Carry — familiarly known as rot ka-poh (Thai: รถกะป๊อ), literally translates to "toad cars." The word ka-poh comes from Teochew (pronounced kub-poh), which means "toad" — reference to their shape. Some are also called rot kra-pong (รถกระป๋อง, literally "tincan cars") or rot-Subaru (รถซูบารุ, literally "Subaru cars") — a reference to their brand.

== History ==
Songthaews were introduced in Thailand in the 1950s. Early songthaews were based on Austin A30 sedans. In 1960s, songthaews used British models like Leyland 15/20, Morris 250 JU, Morris J4, and Morris Minor. In 1970s, songthaews started using various models like Mercedes-Benz T2.

== Use ==
Songthaews are used both within towns and cities and for longer routes between towns and villages. Those within towns are converted from pick-up trucks and usually travel fixed routes for a set fare, but in some cases (as in Chiang Mai), they are used as shared taxis for passengers traveling in roughly the same direction. Vehicles on longer routes may use truck bodies and seat around 40 passengers.

== Future replacements ==
In 1990s, Thai government attempted to replace songthaews with modern minibuses. Thai Motor Corporation (THAMCO), BMW, and Italdesign cooperated for designing Italdesign Columbus as songthaew replacement. Italdesign Columbus had bodywork variations, including minibus, pick-up truck, and delivery van.

== Gallery ==
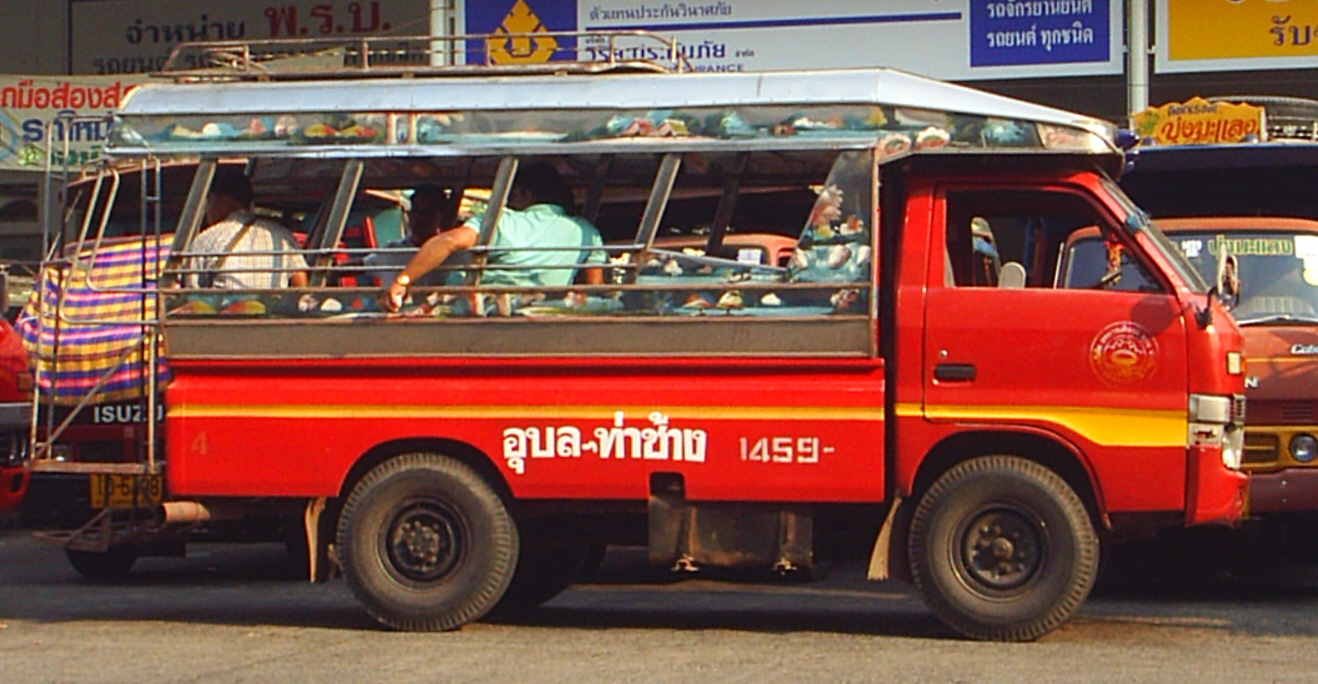
A medium-sized inter-village songthaew

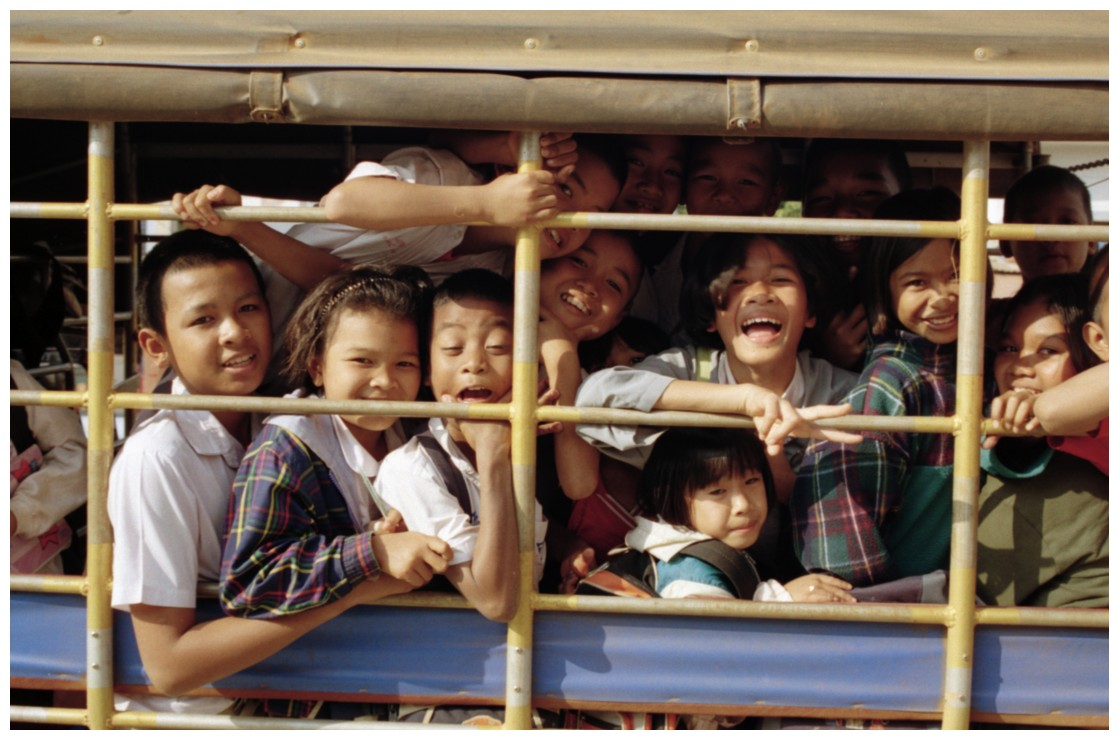
A songthaew loaded with students heading home in Sisaket province

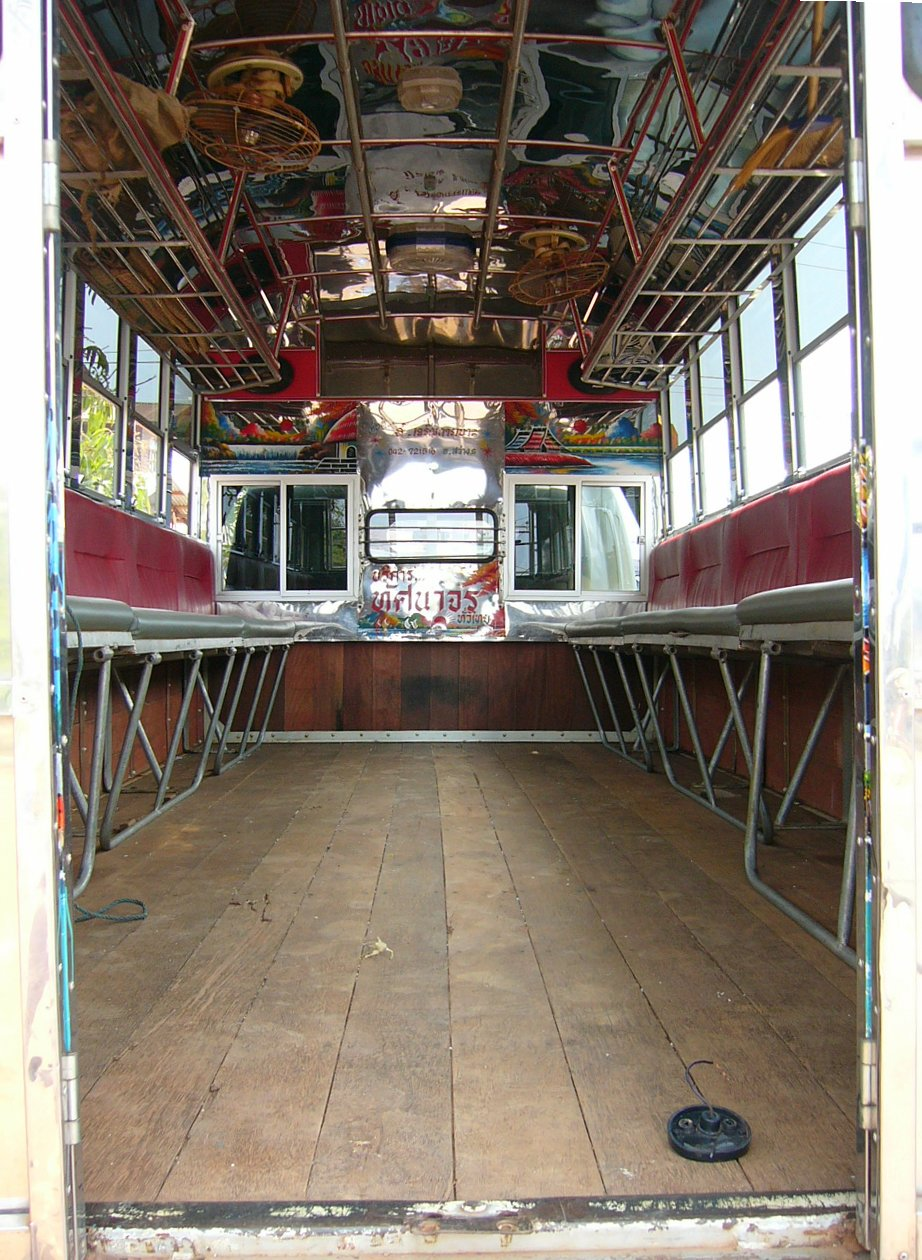
The interior of a pick-up truck songthaew in Sakon Nakhon

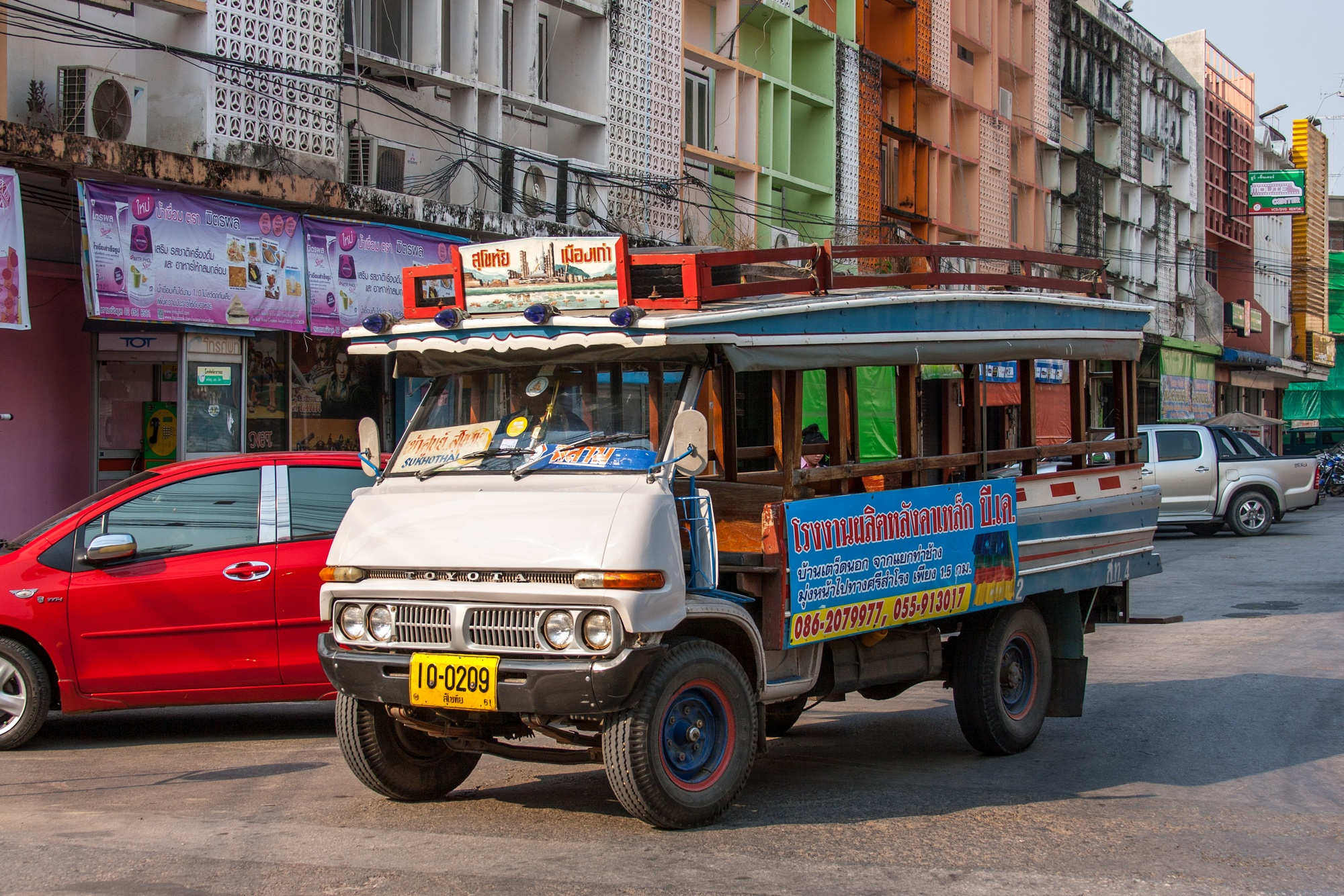
Toyota Dyna in Sukhothai province

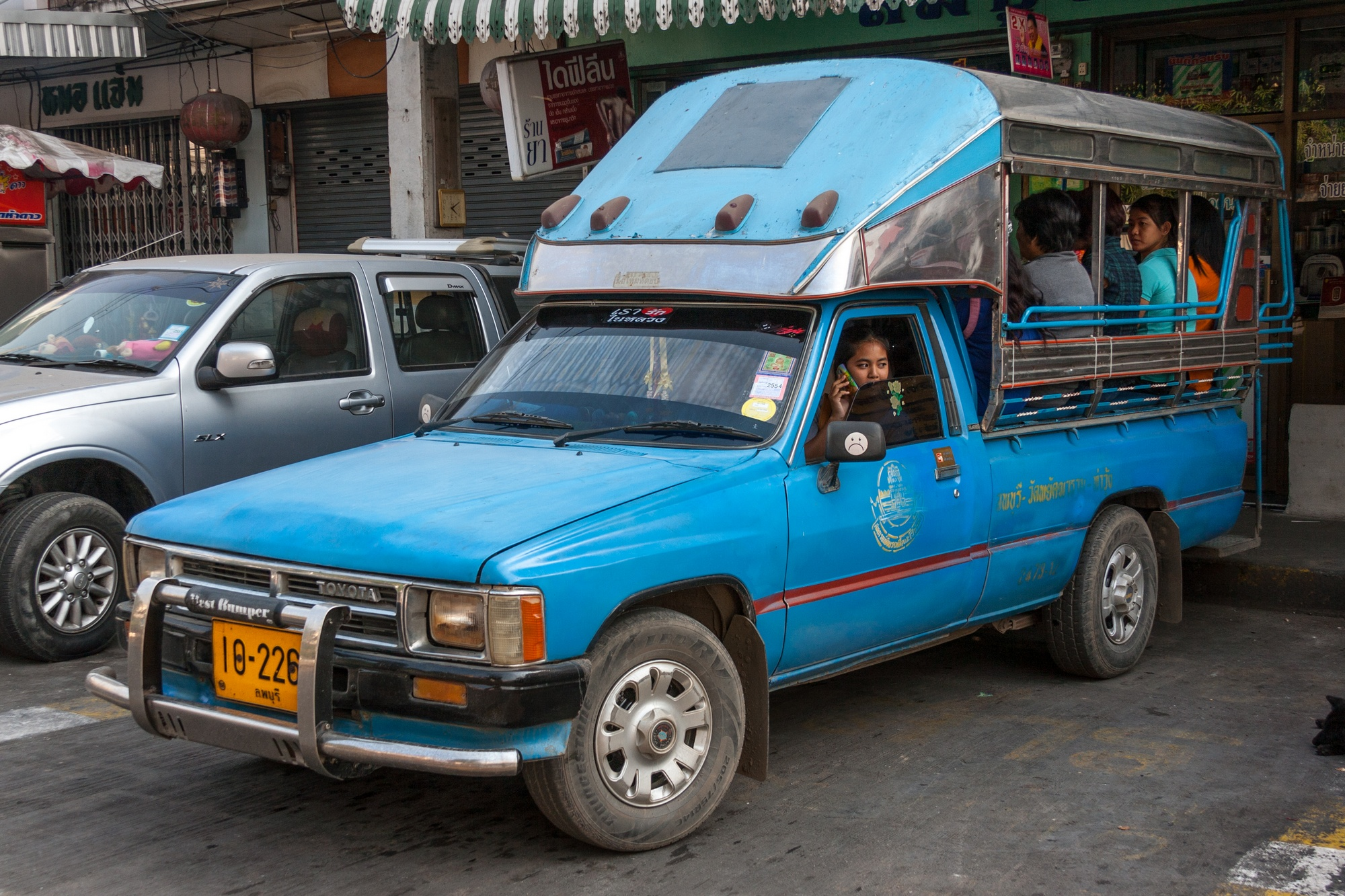
Toyota Hilux in Lopburi province

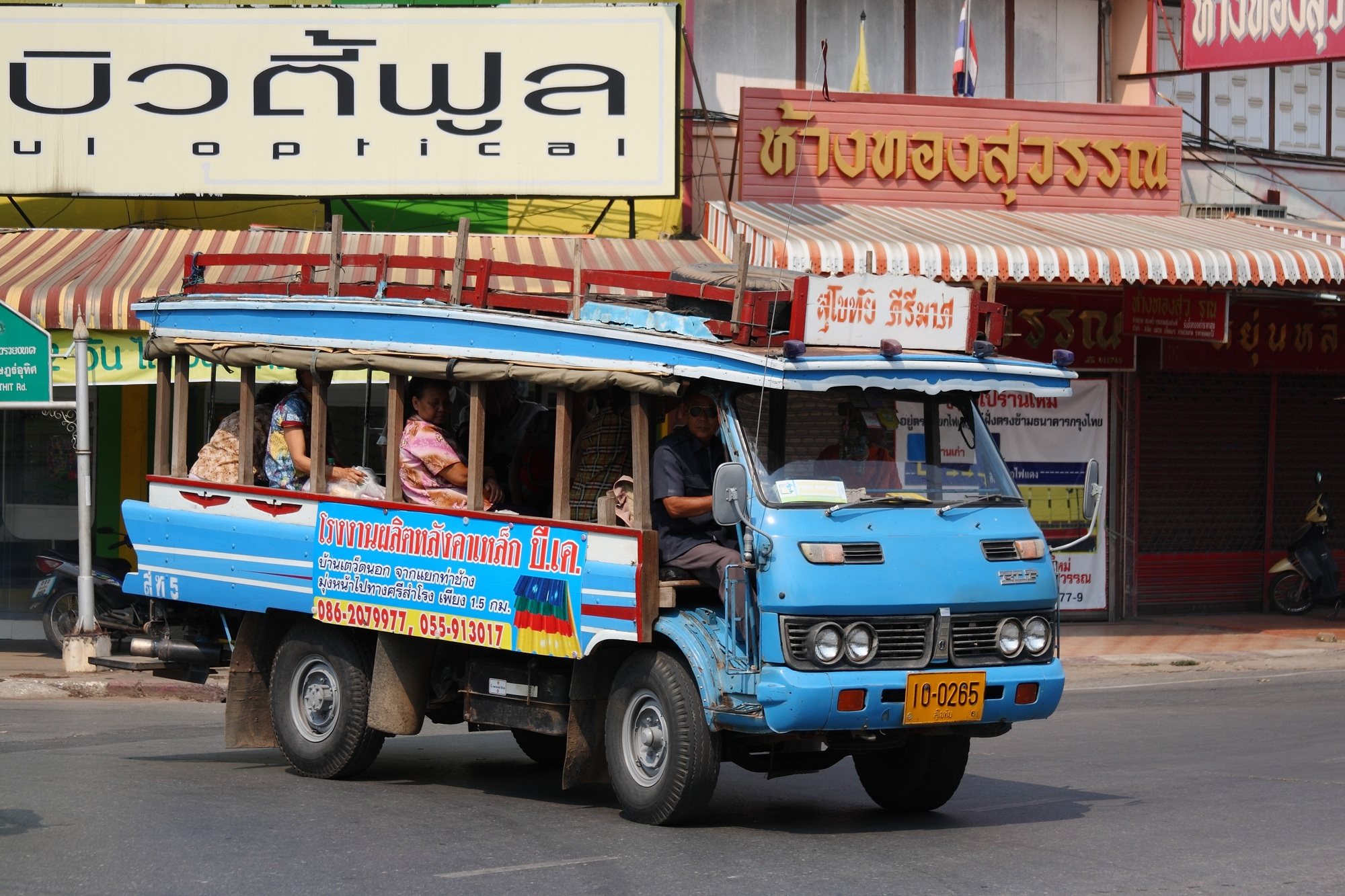
Isuzu Elf at Sukhothai province

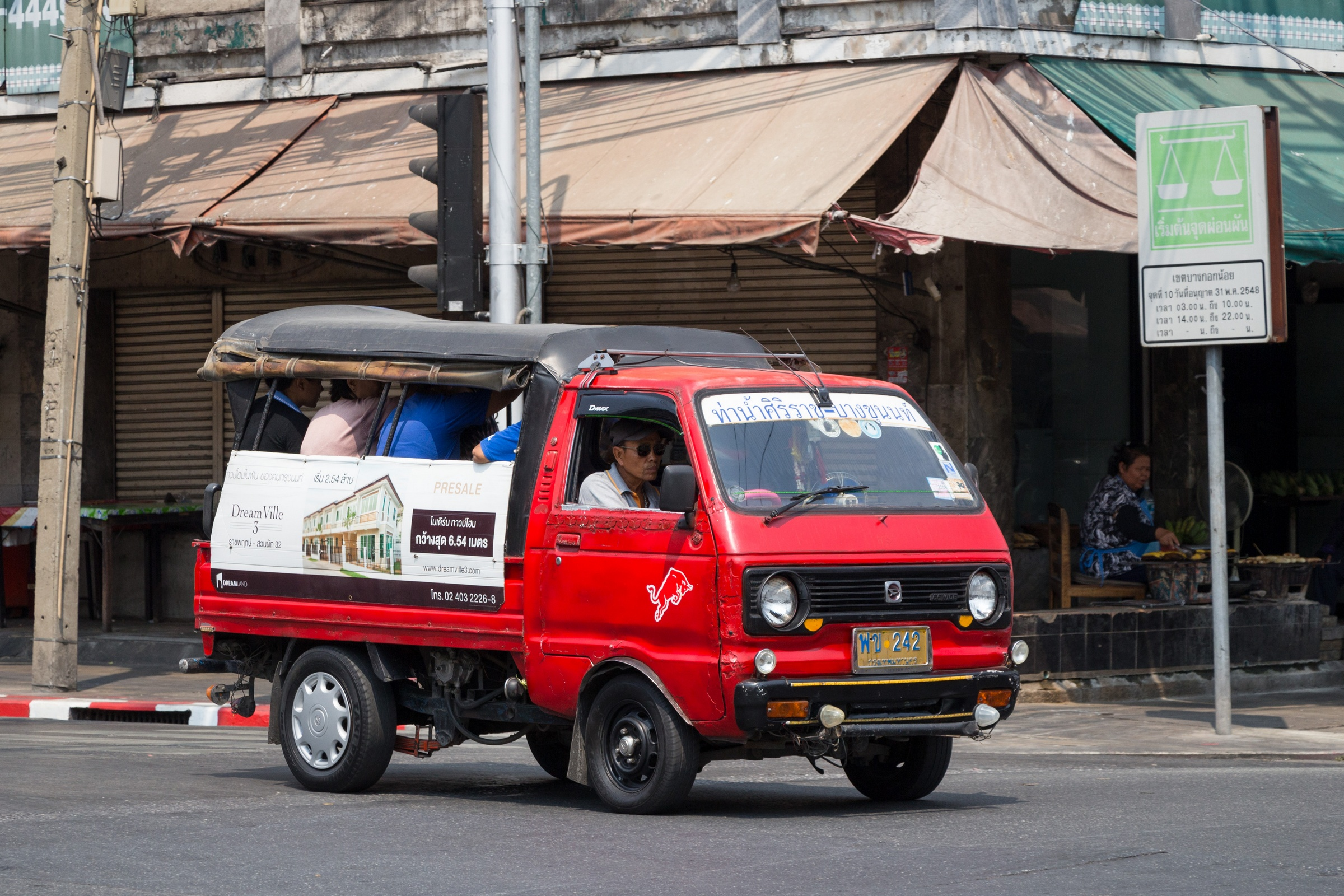
Daihatsu Hijet near Siriraj Piyamaharajkarun Hospital

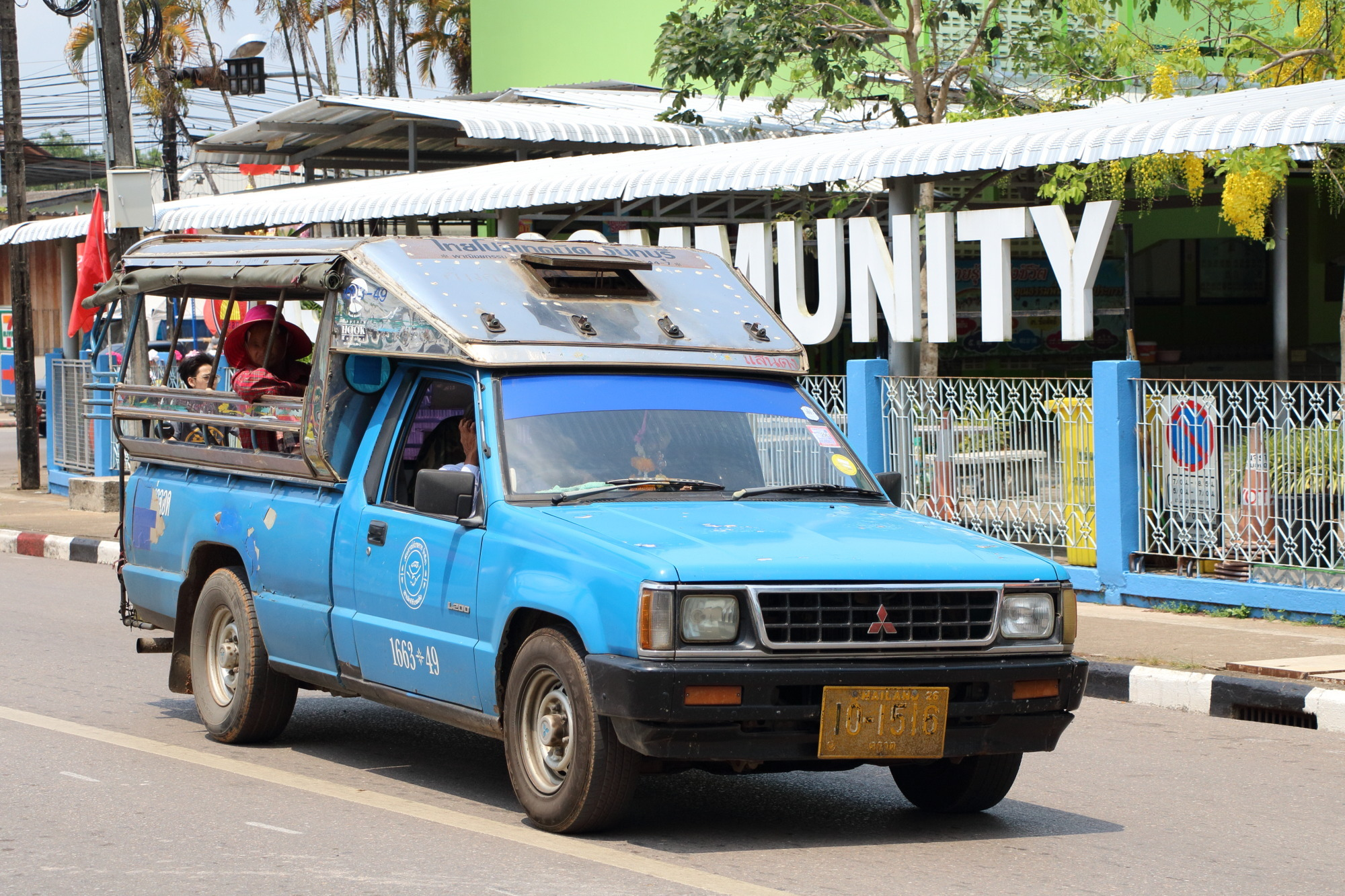
Mitsubishi L200 in Trat province

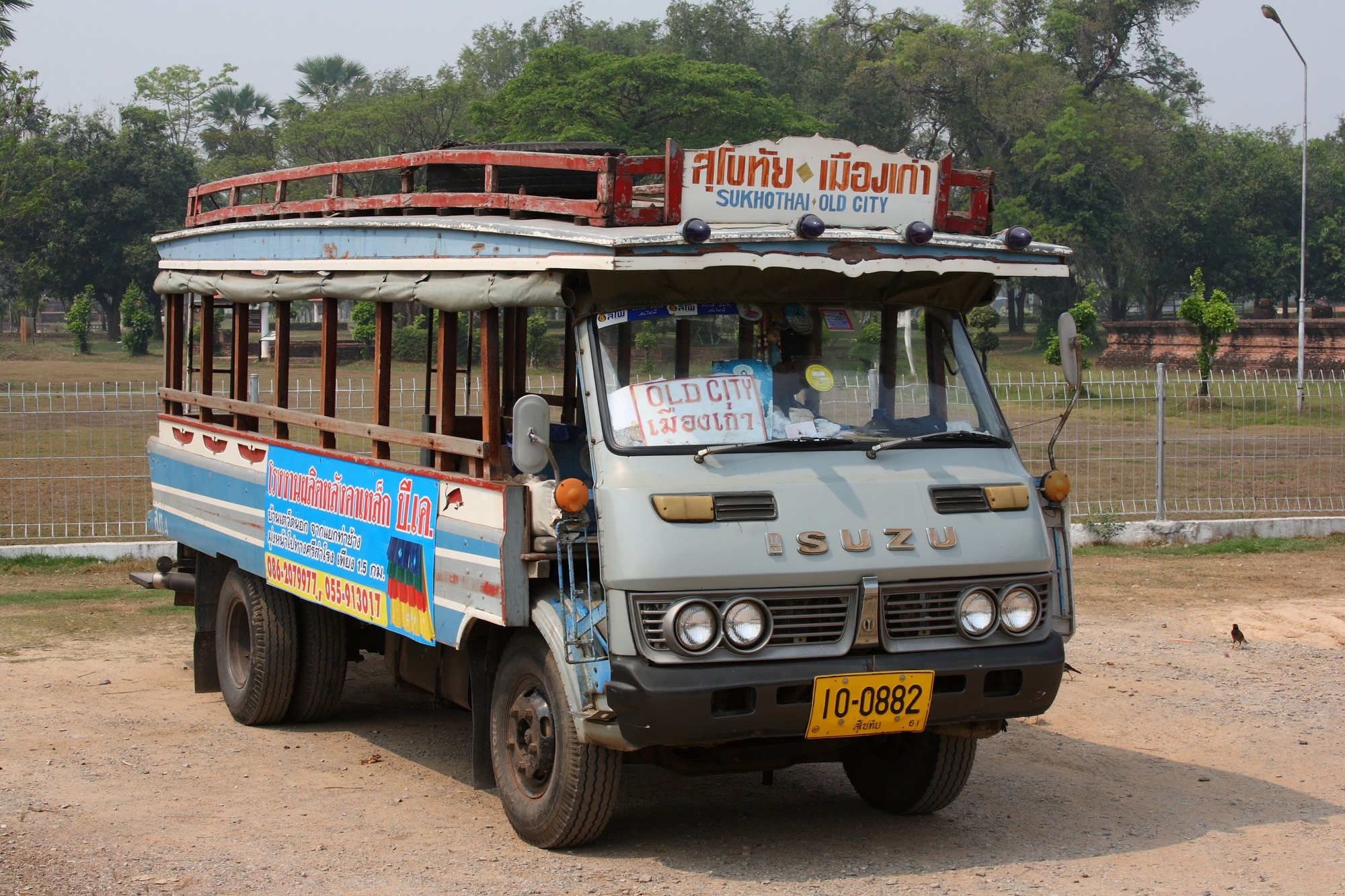
Isuzu Elf in Sukhothai province

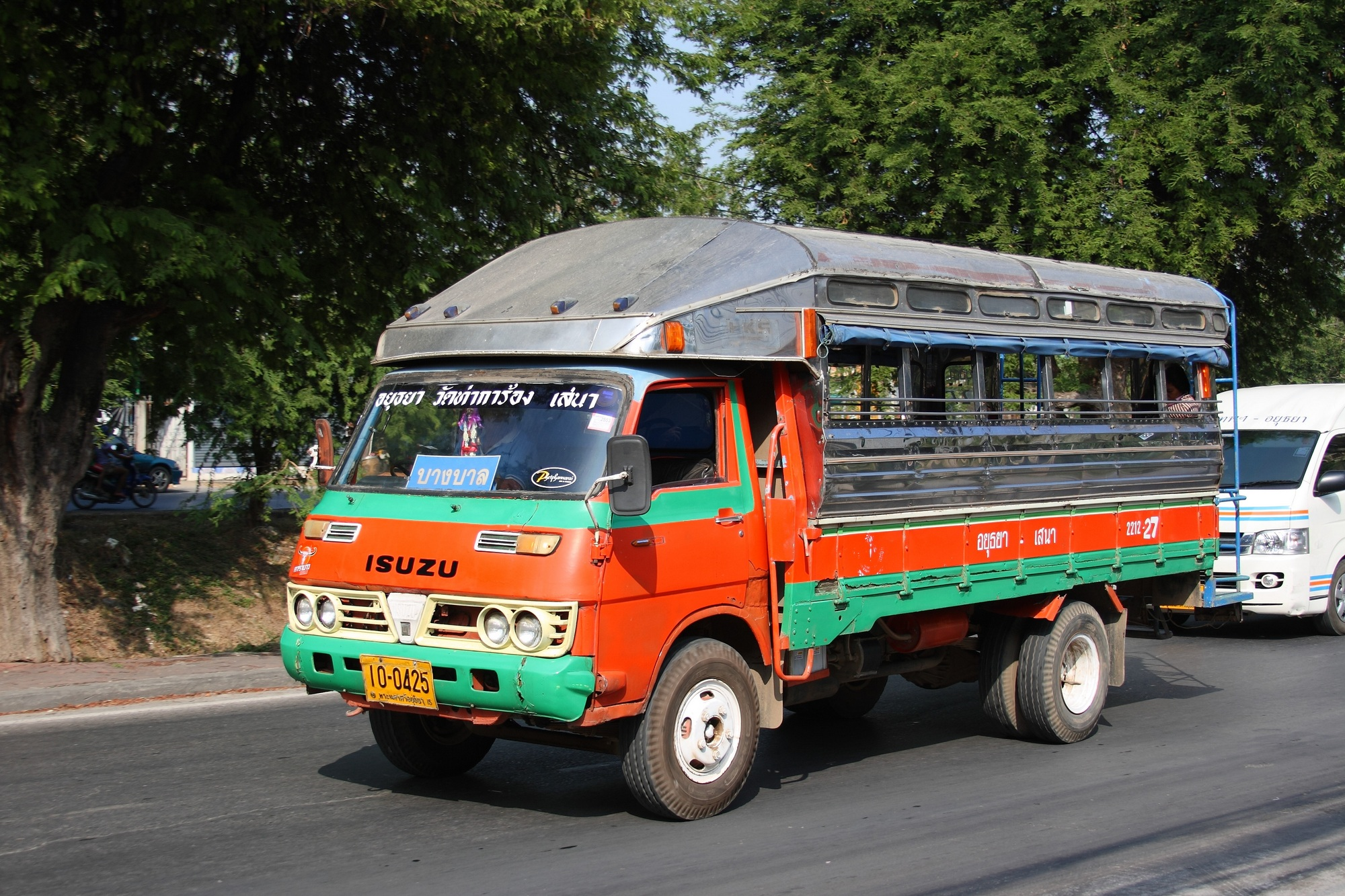
Isuzu Elf in Phra Nakhon Si Ayutthaya province

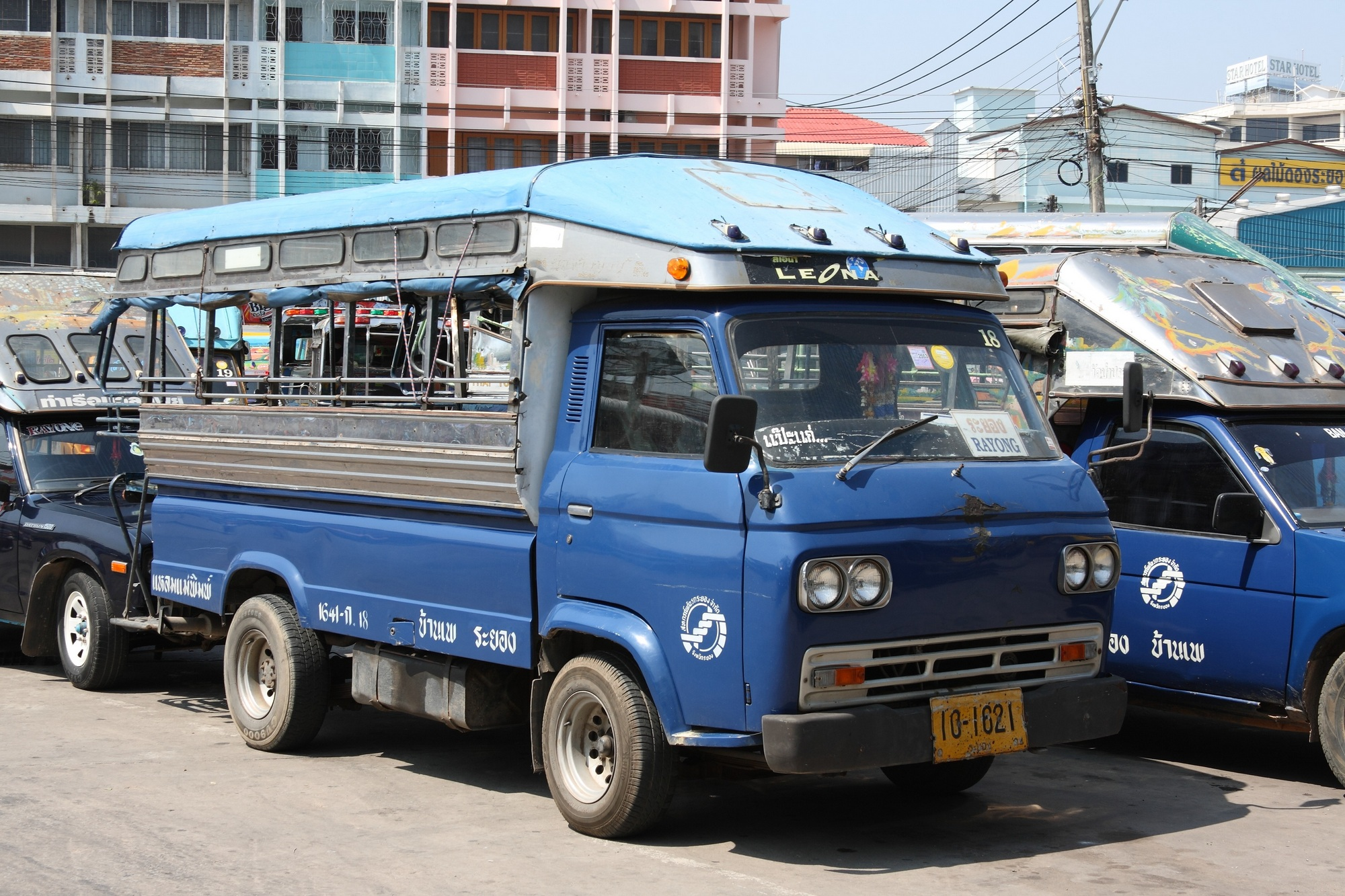
Isuzu Elf in Rayong province

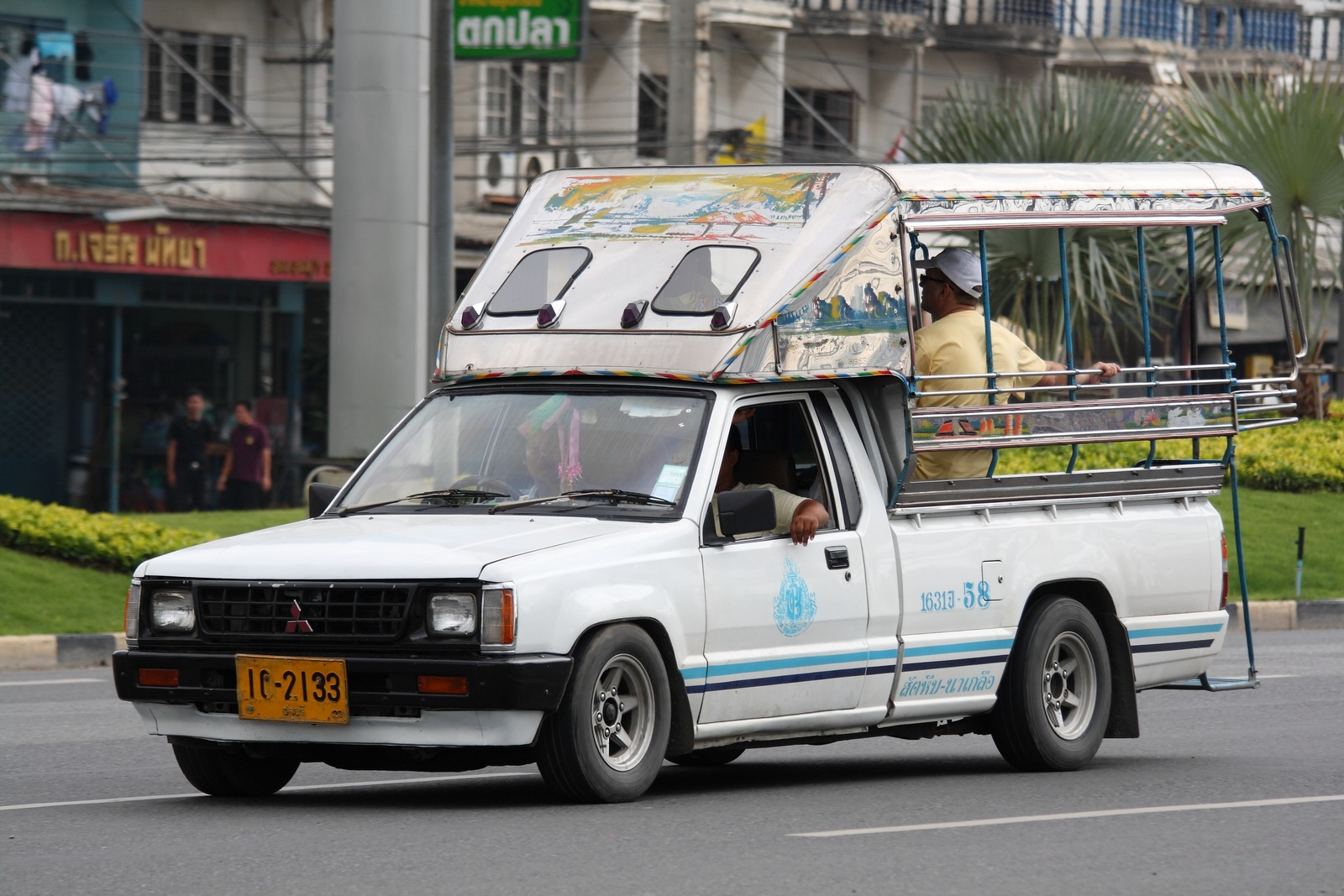
Mitsubishi Cyclone in Pattaya

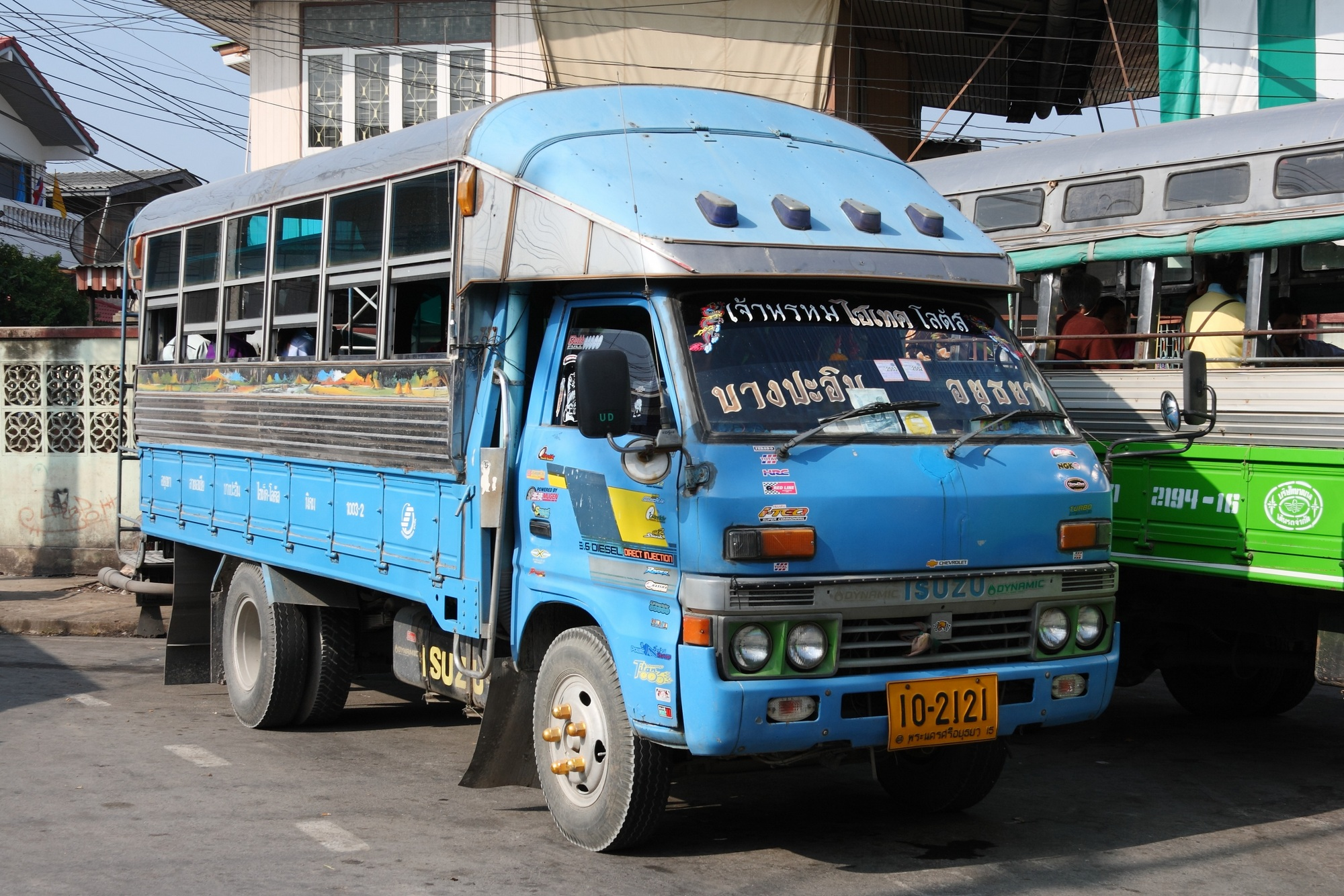
Isuzu Giga in Phra Nakhon Si Ayutthaya province

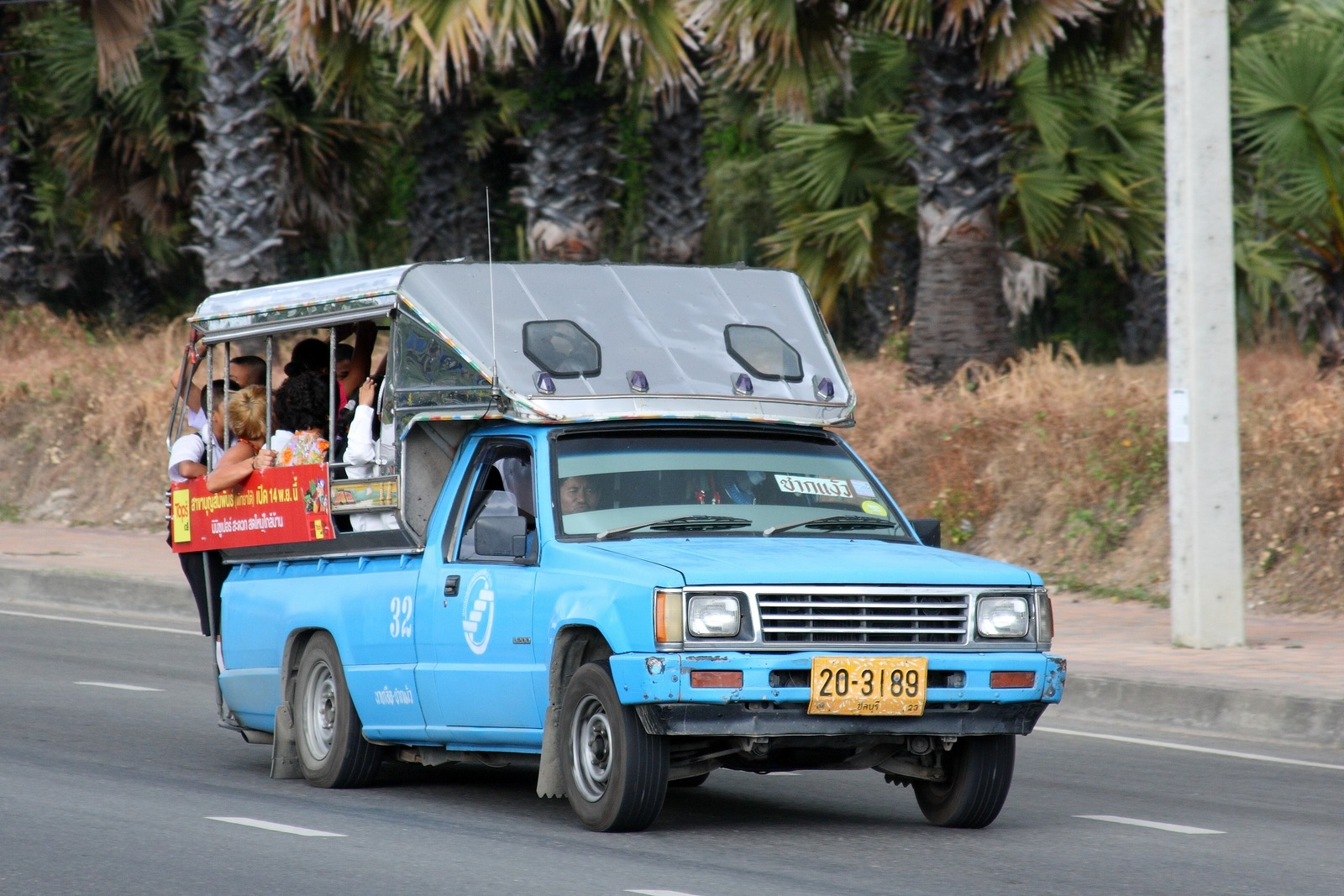
Mitsubishi L200 in Pattaya

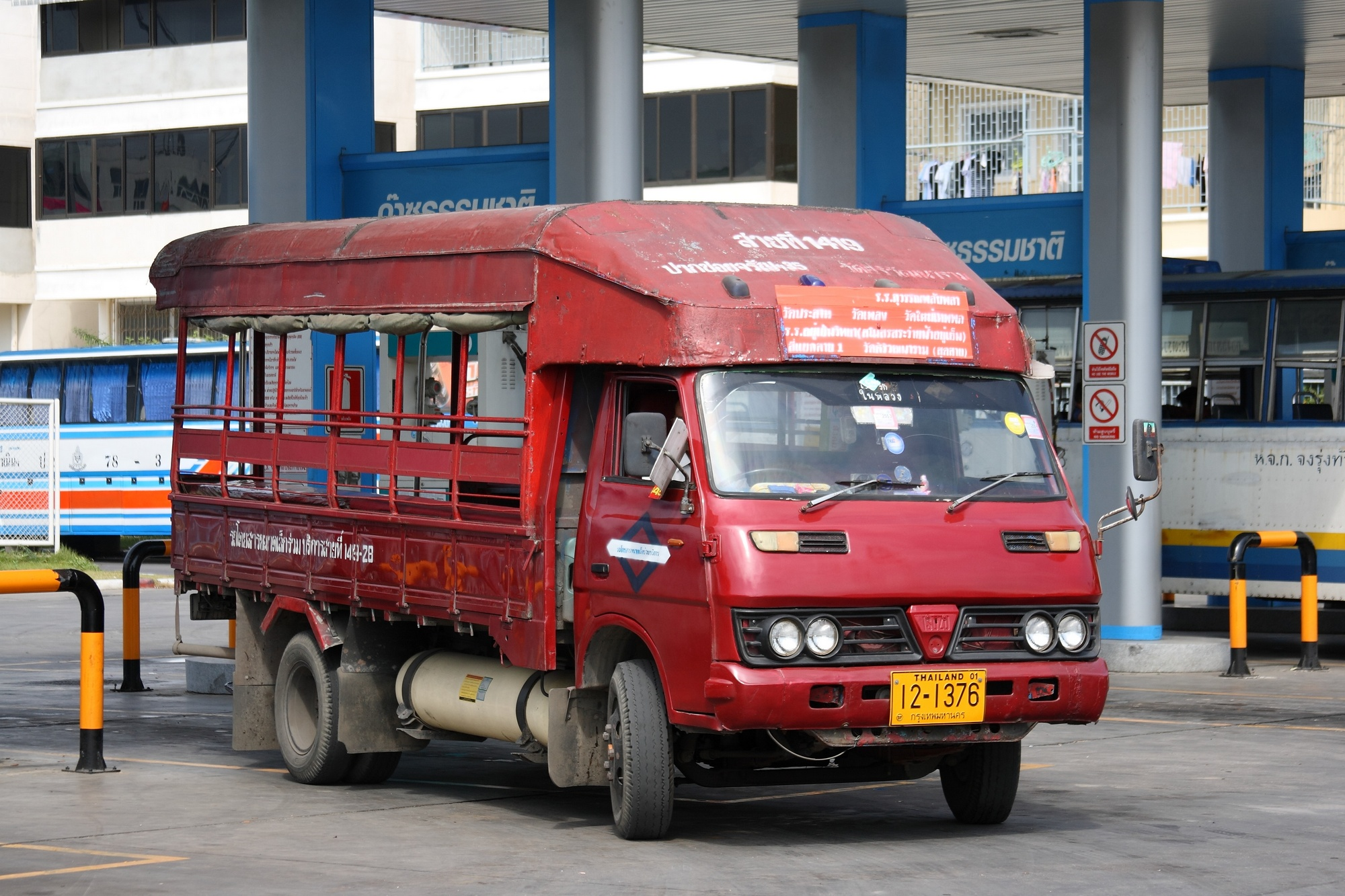
Isuzu Elf in Bangkok

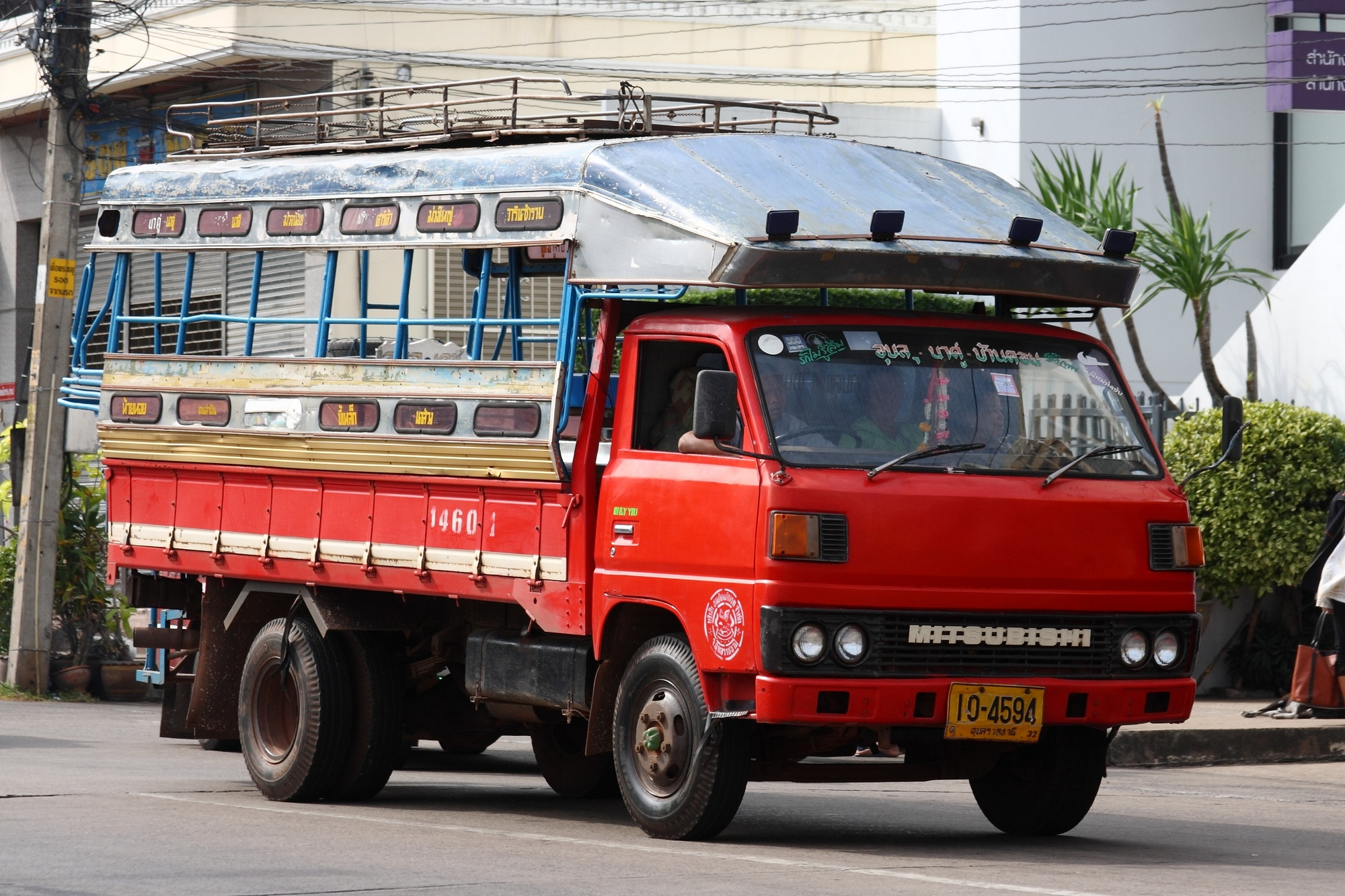
Mitsubishi Fuso Canter in Ubon Ratchathani

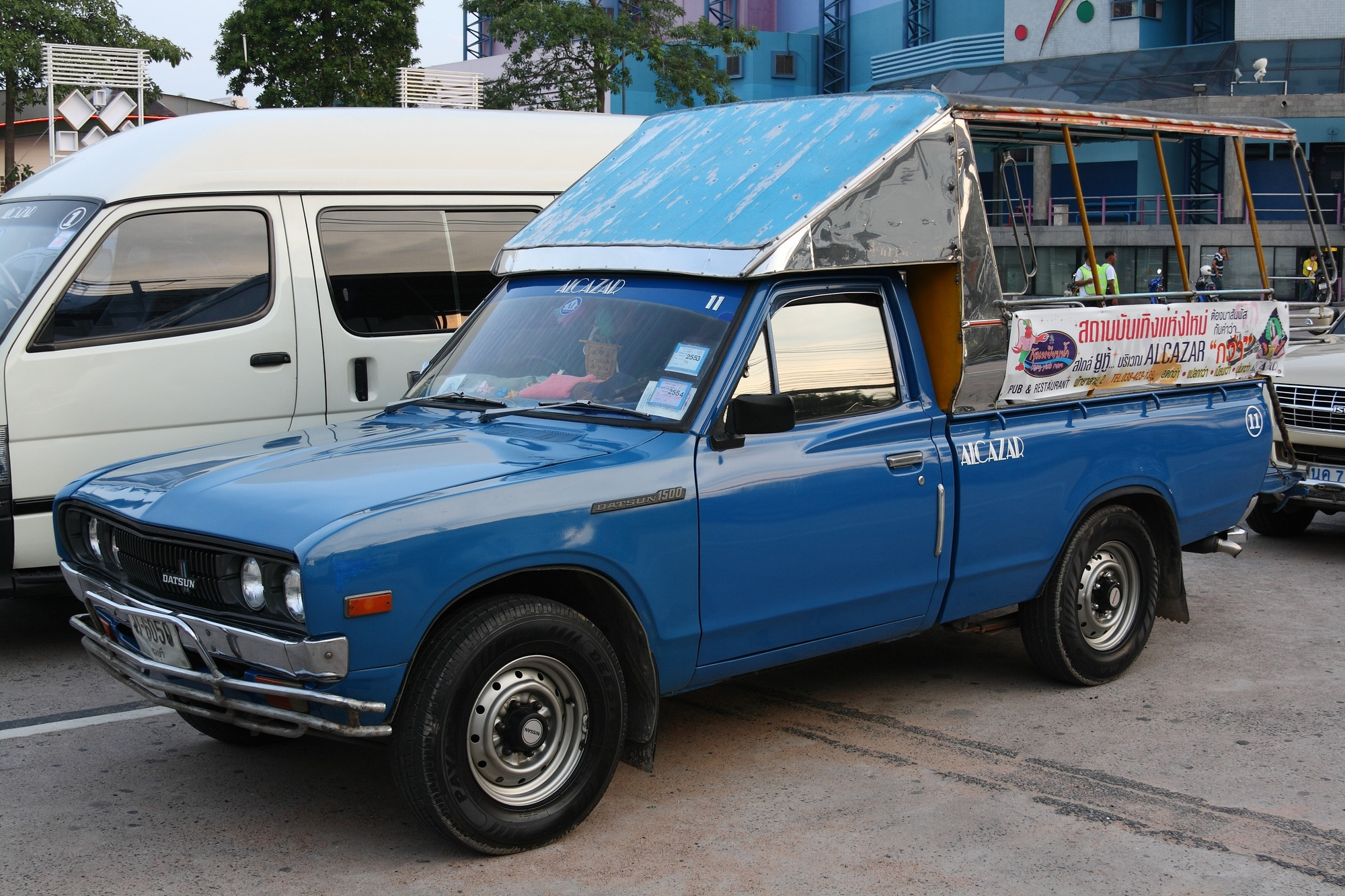
Datsun 620 in Pattaya

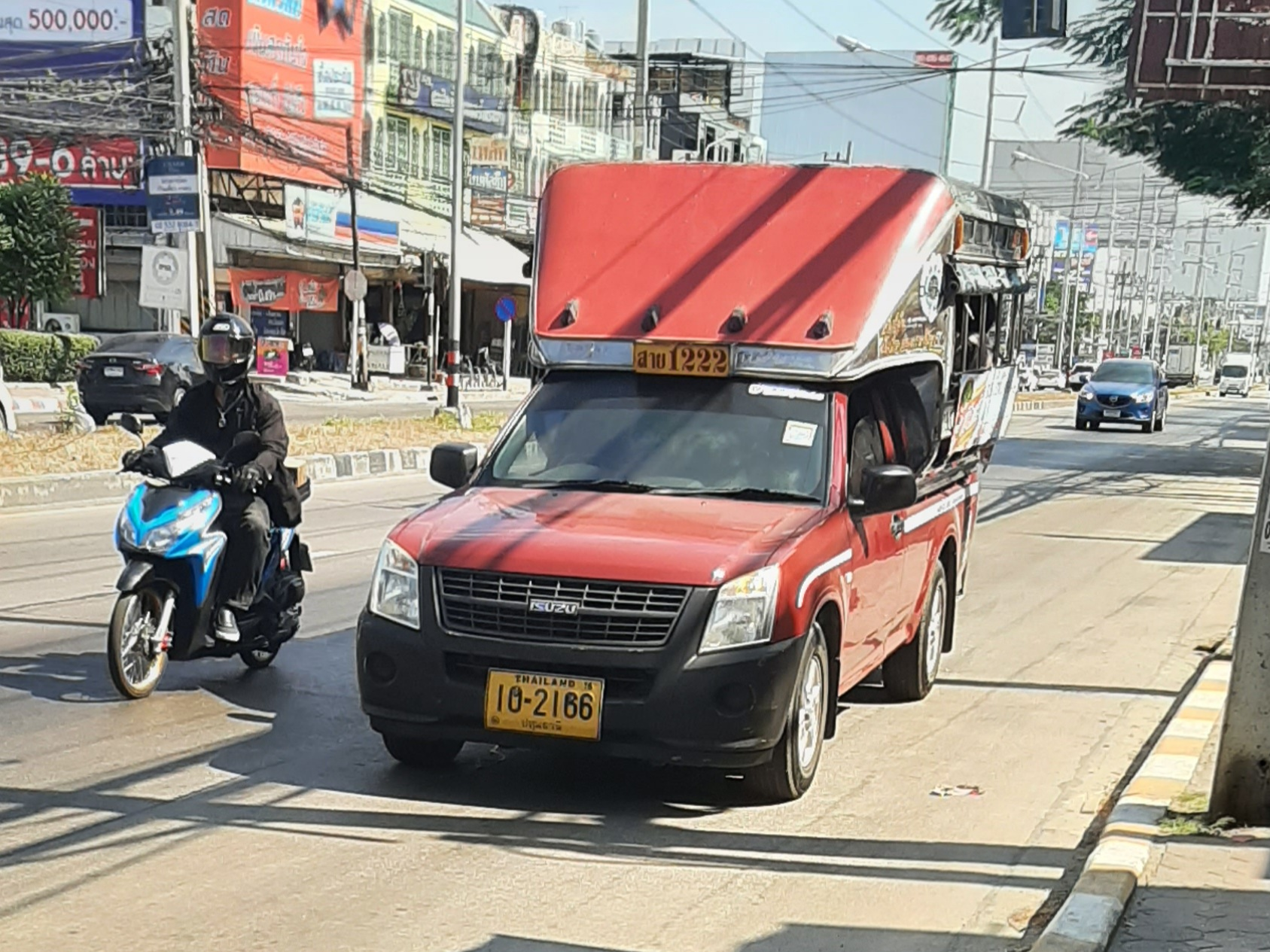
Isuzu D-Max In Pathumthani

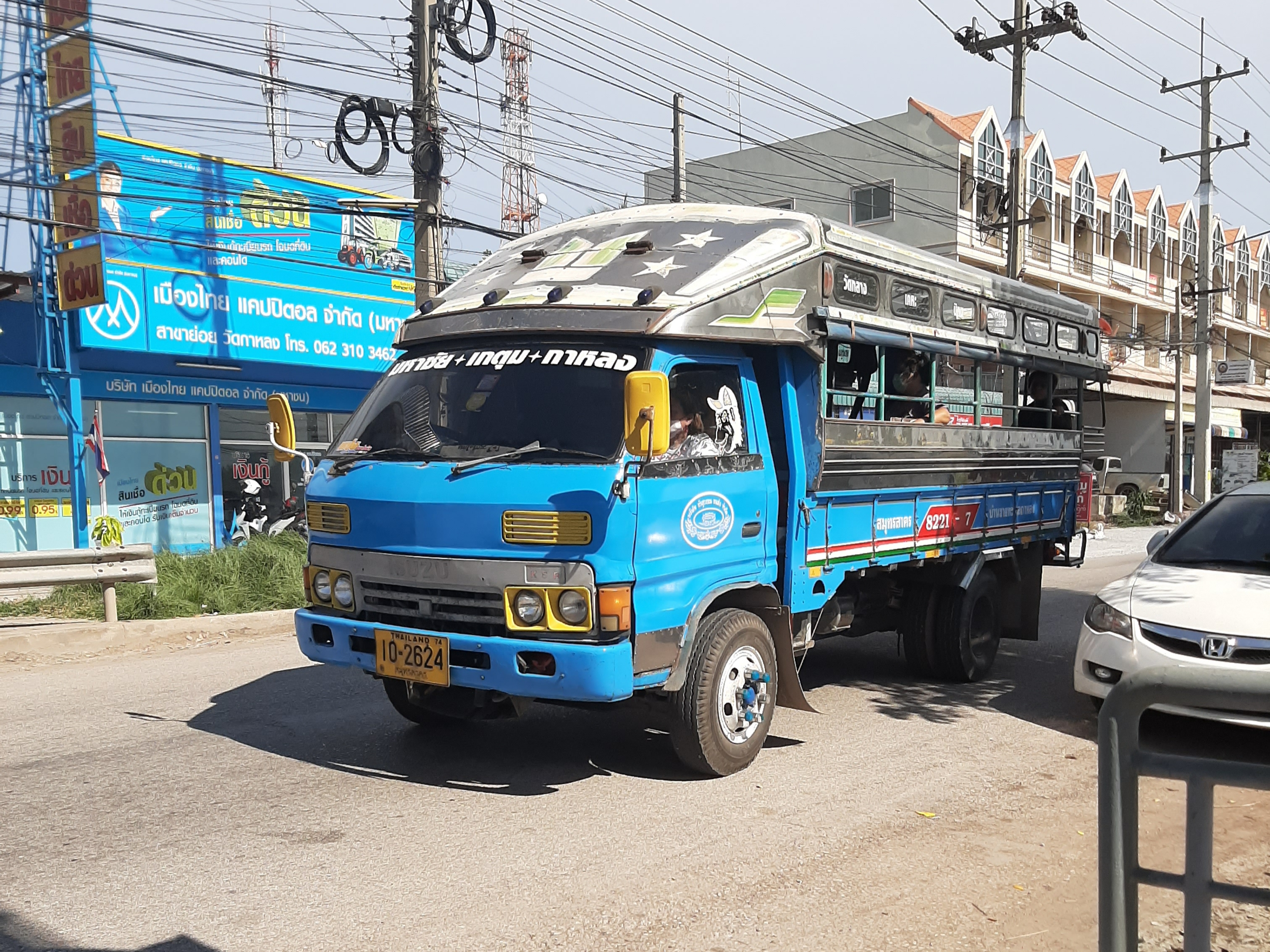
Isuzu Giga in Samut Sakhon

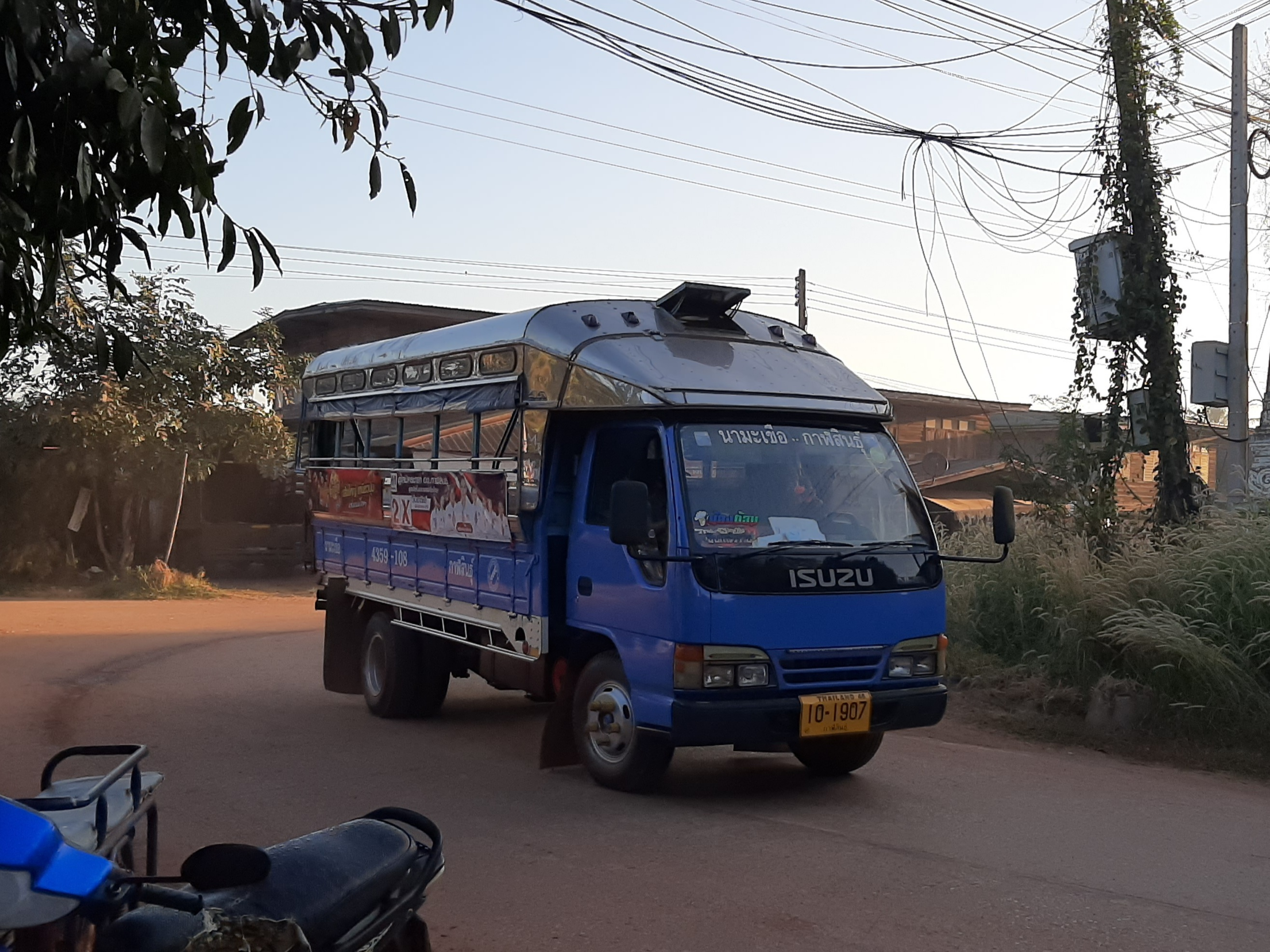
Isuzu NPR in Kalasin

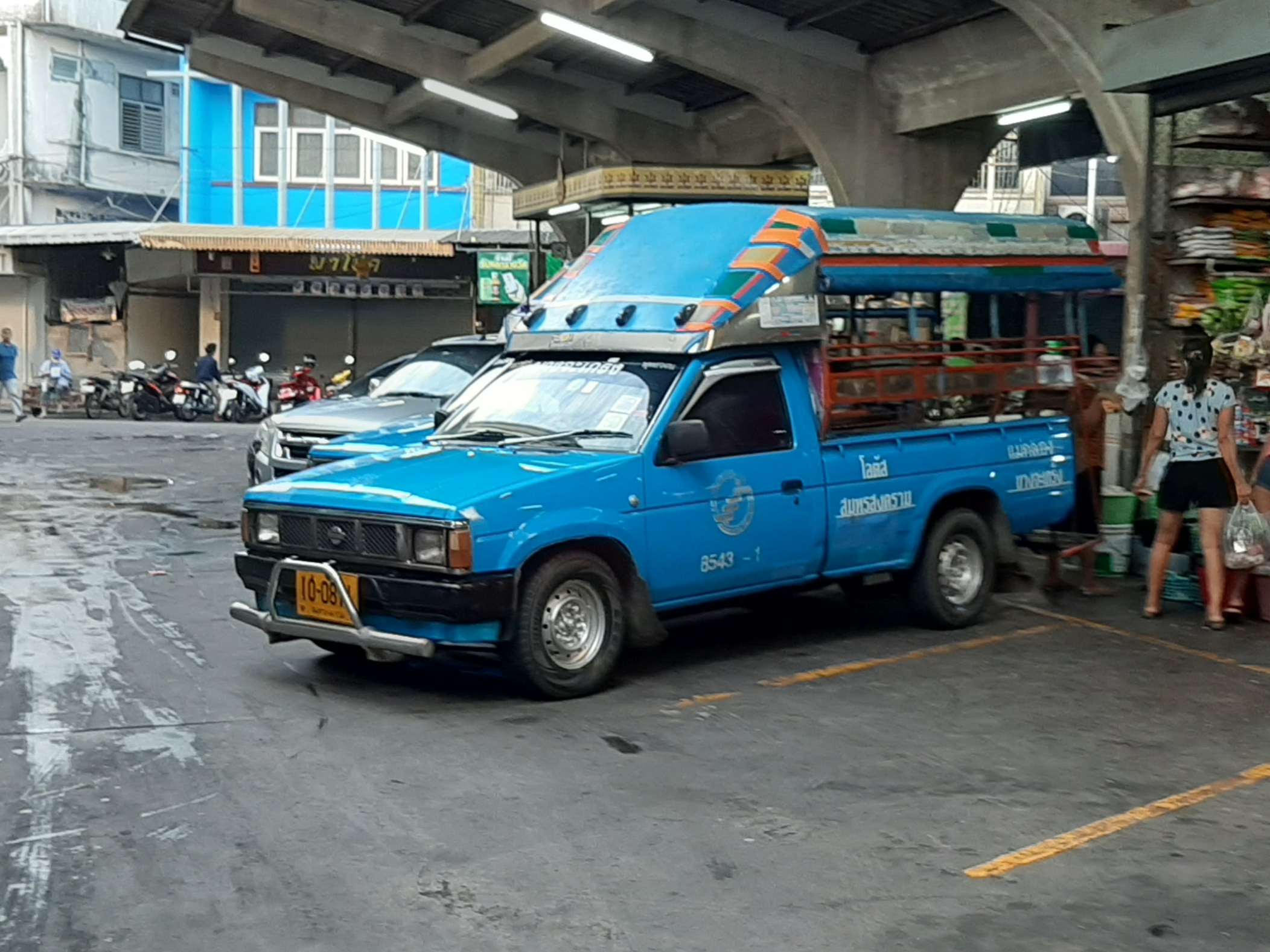
Nissan Big M in Samut Songkhram

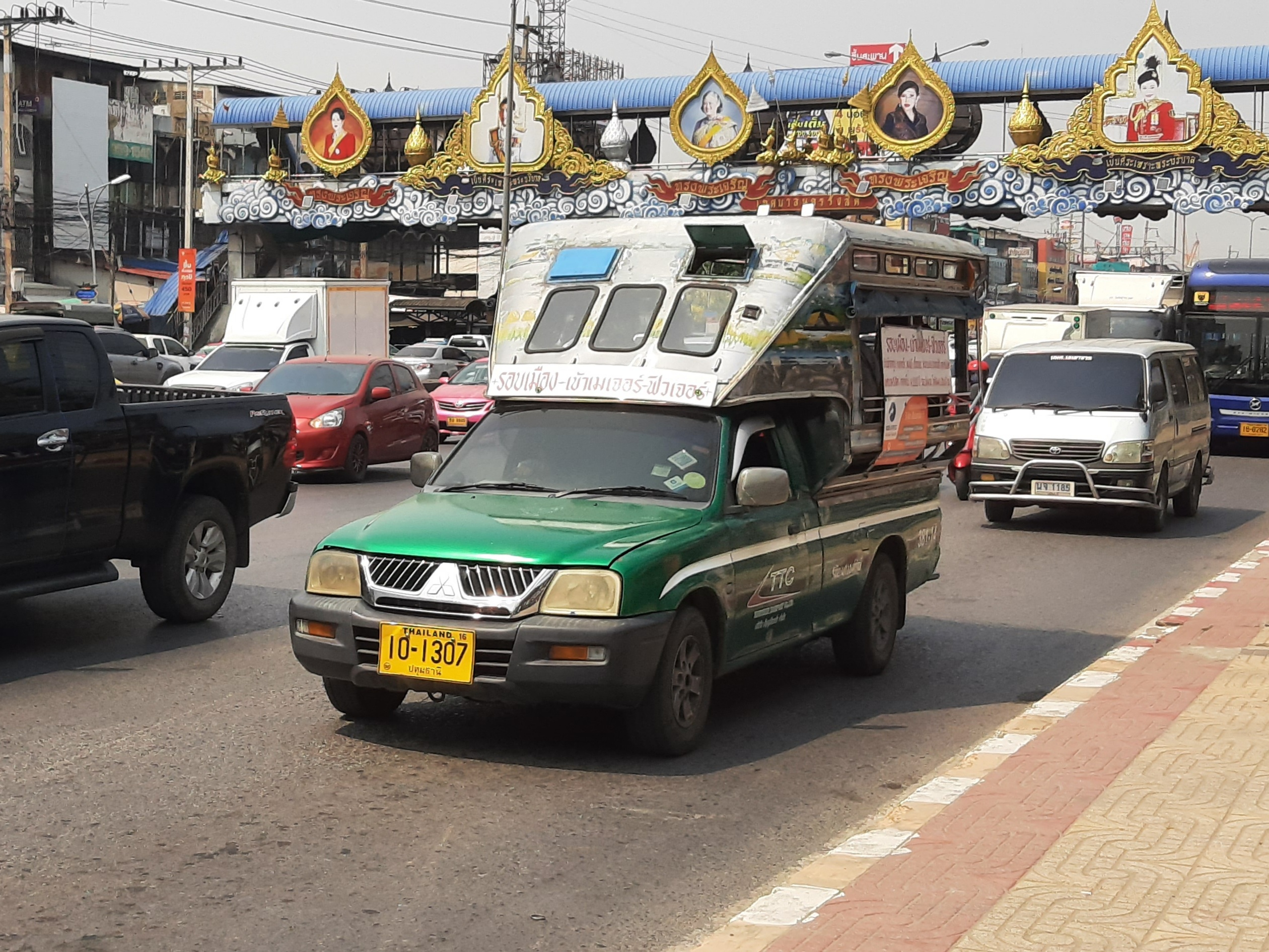
Mitsubishi Strada in Pathumthani

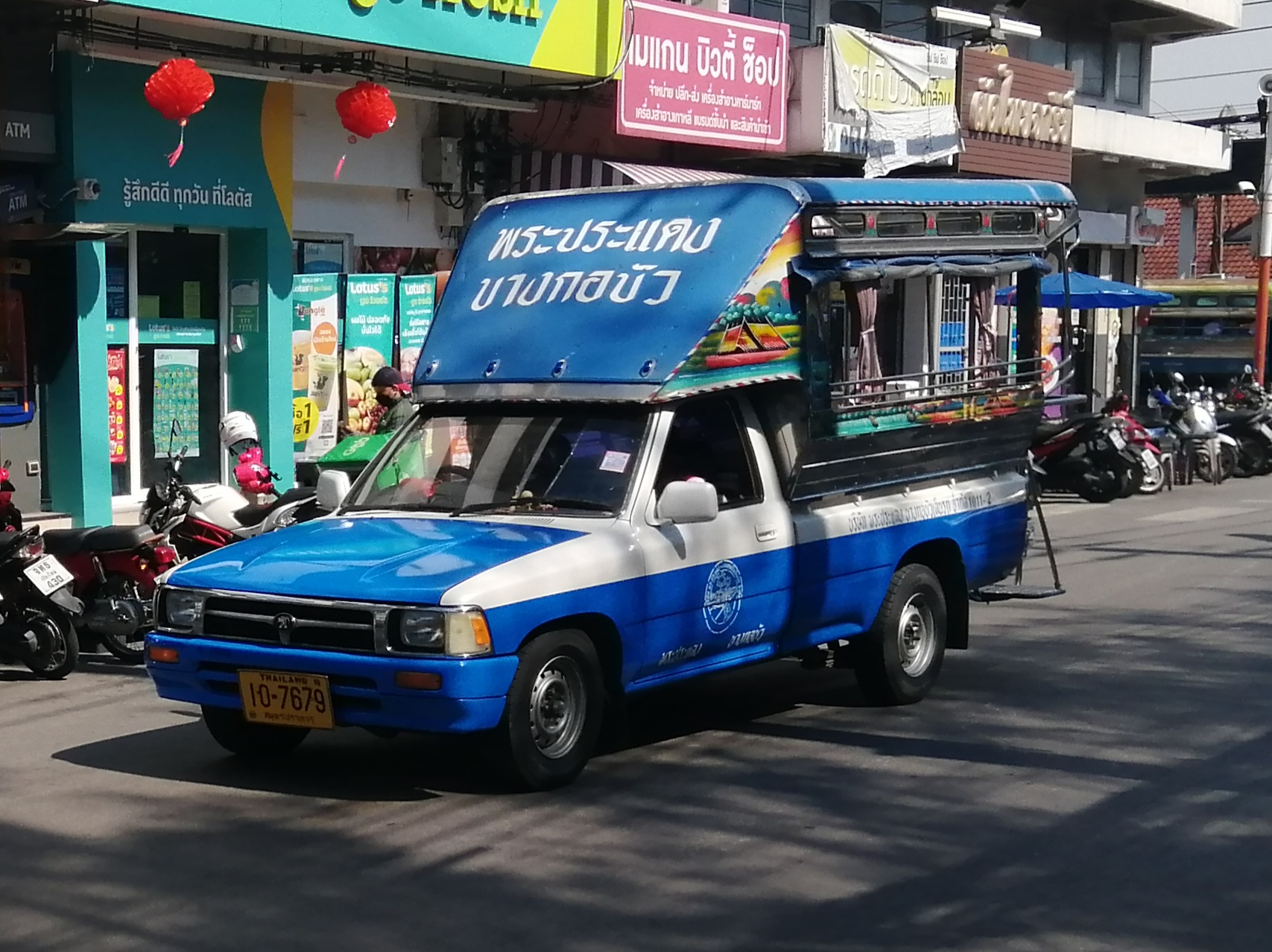
Toyota Hilux Mighty-X in Samut Prakan

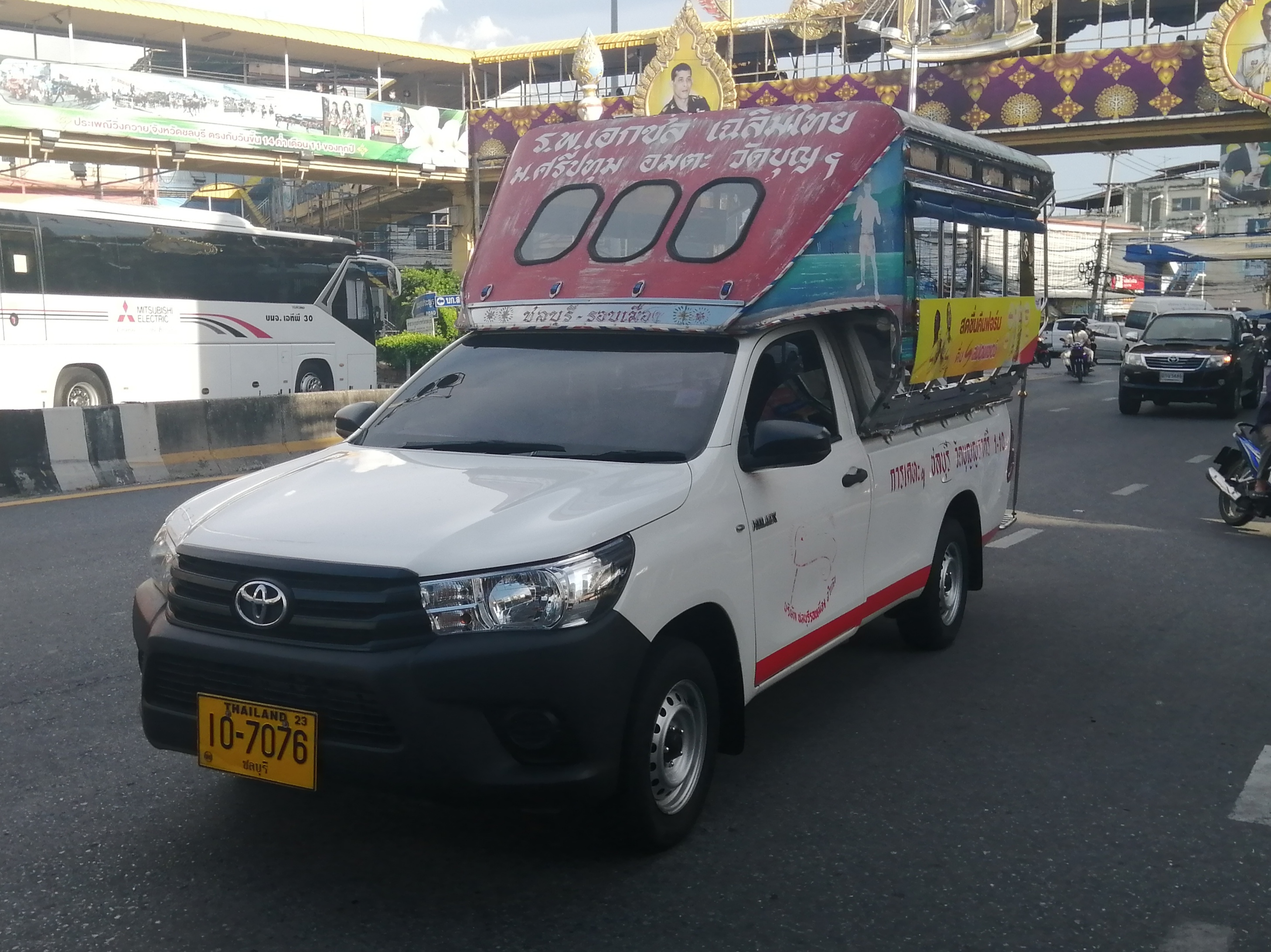
Toyota Hilux Revo in Chonburi

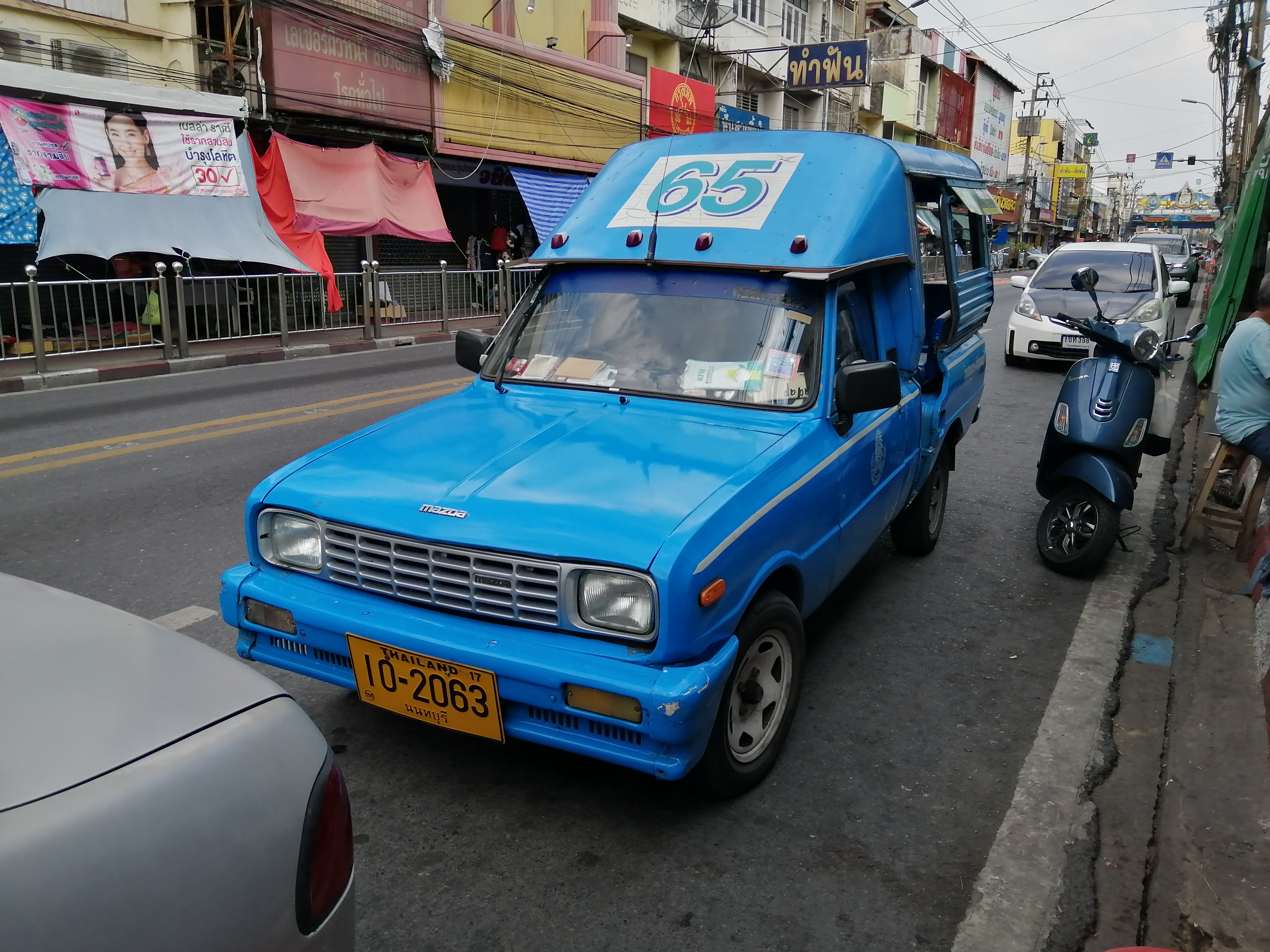
Mazda Familia in Nonthaburi

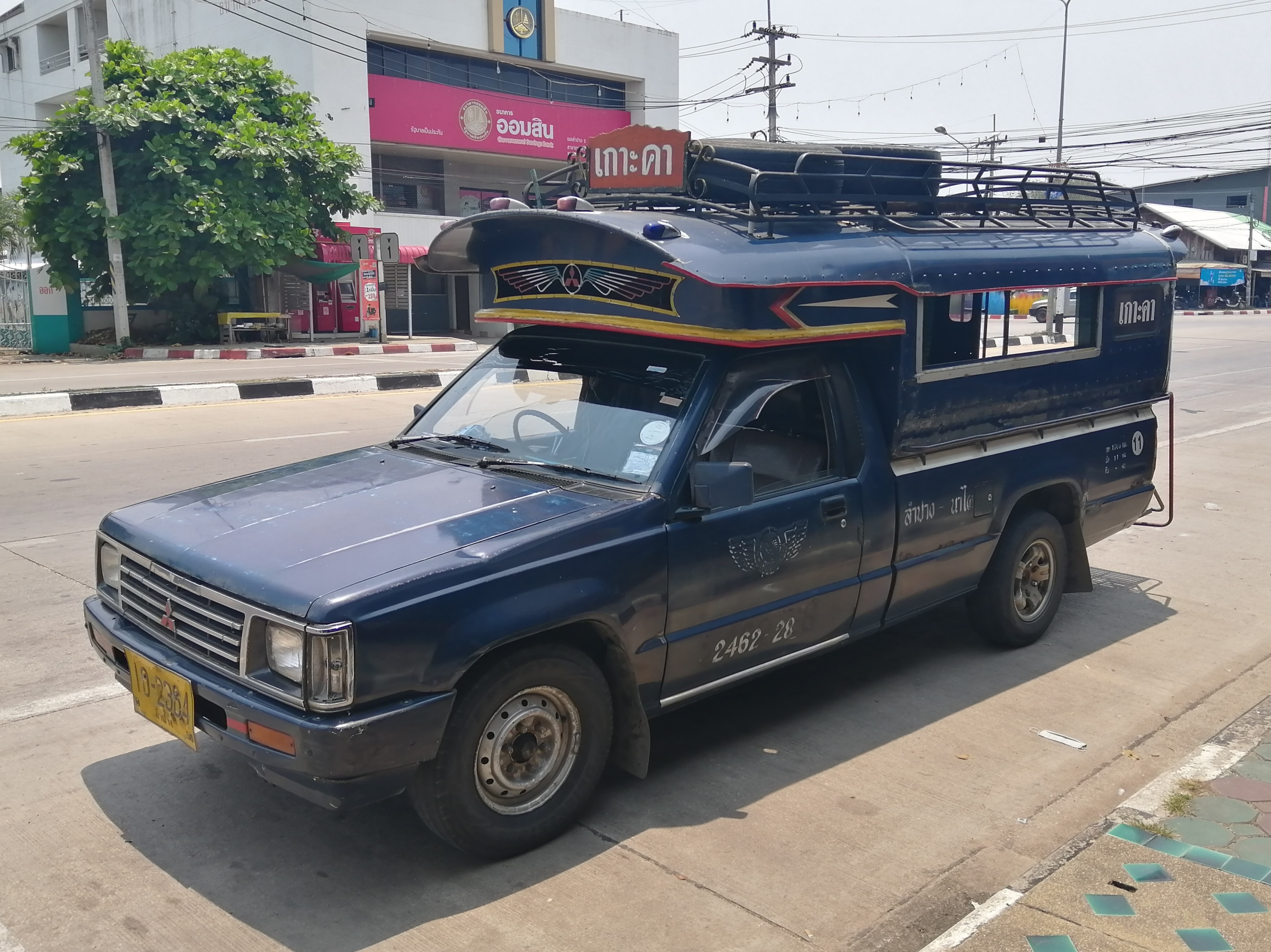
Mitsubishi L200 in Lampang

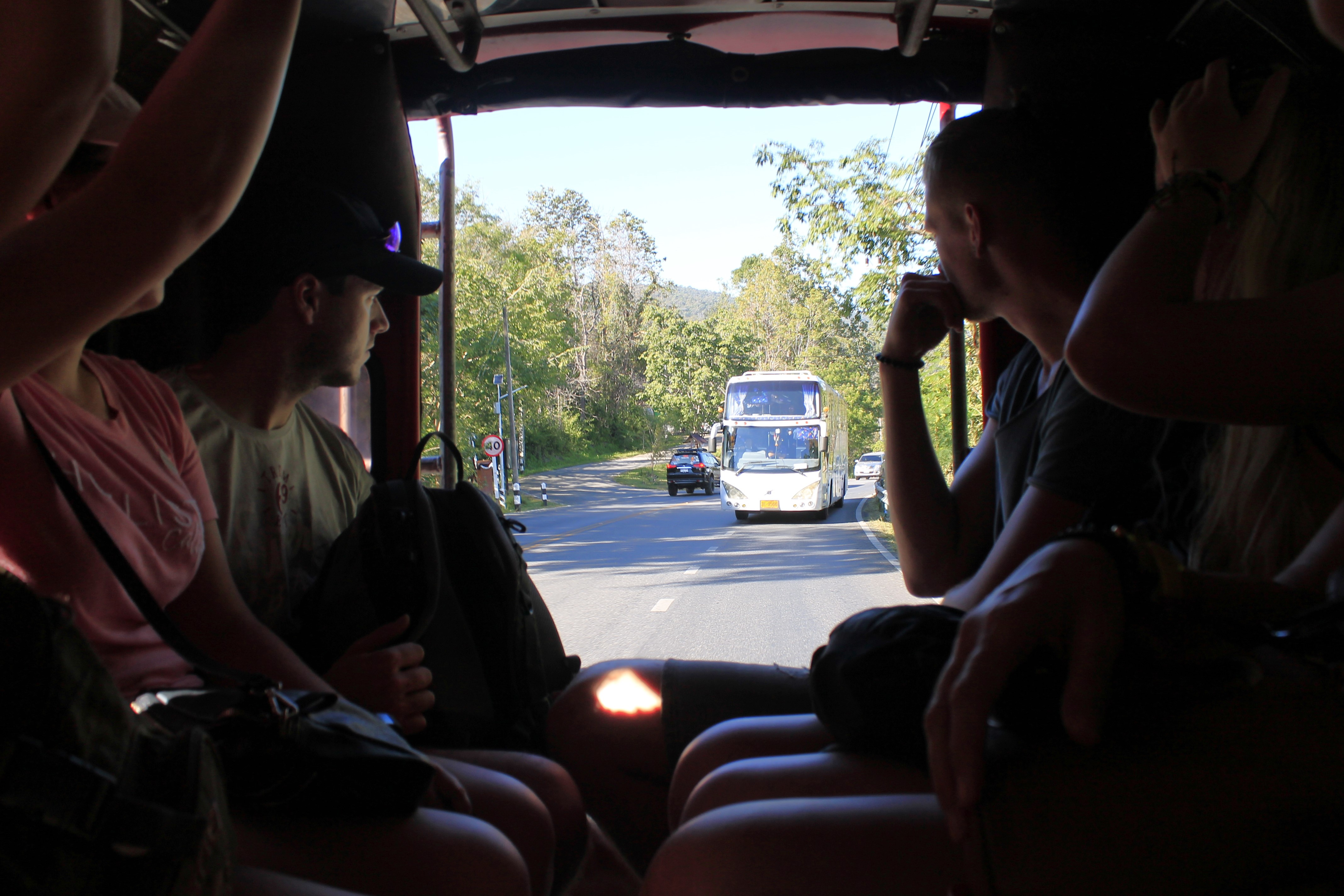
Riding in a songthaew in Chiang Mai

== See also ==
- Transport in Thailand
- Charabanc
- Combination bus
- Pickup truck
- Tuk tuk
- Jeepney
- Share taxi
- Matatu
- Pesero
- Dollar van
- Marshrutka
- Dolmuş
- Public light bus Hong Kong
- Nanny van
