= Thawi Watthana district =

Thawi Watthana ทวีวัฒนา
- Khet
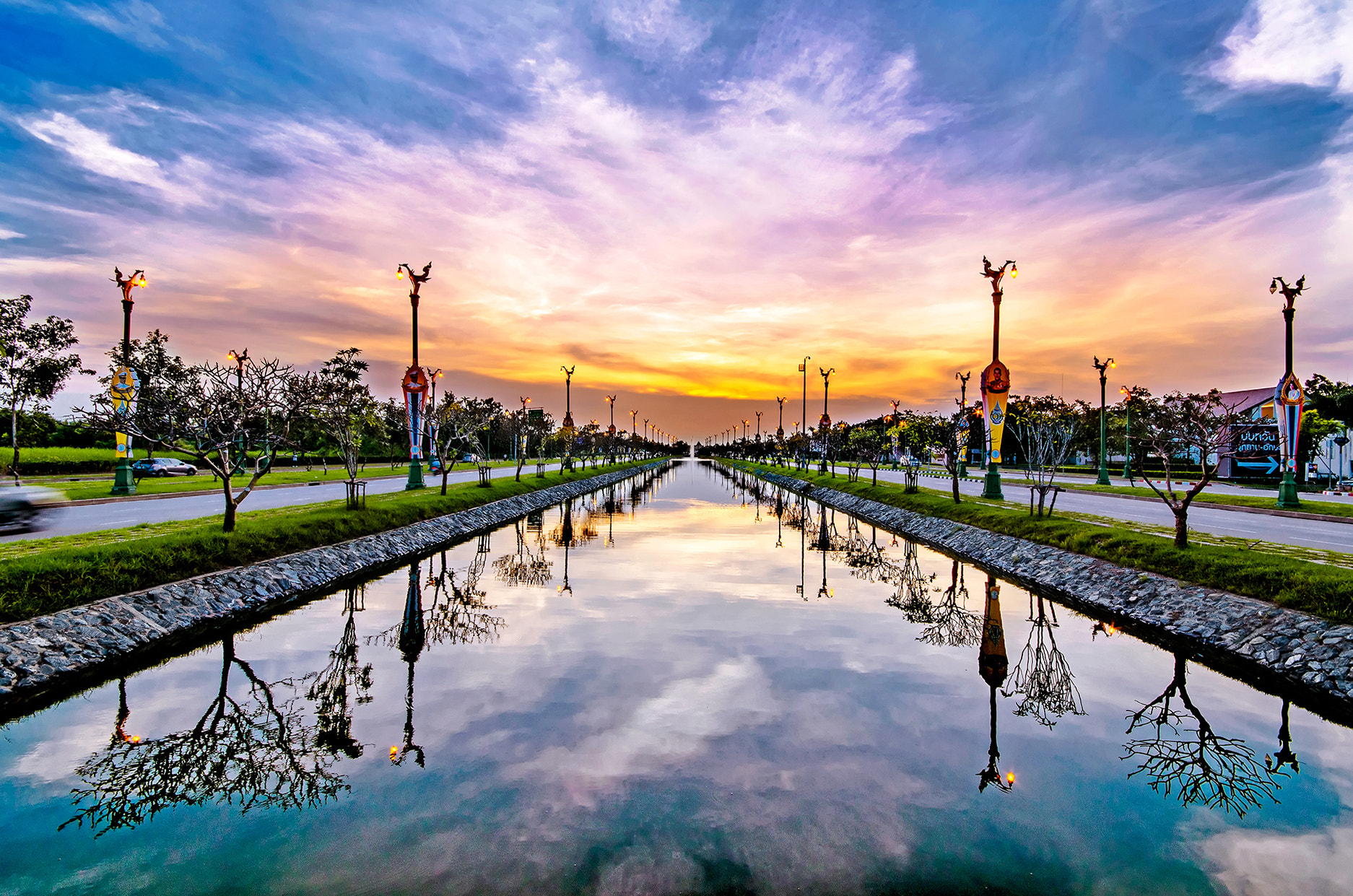
- Utthayan Road

- Khet location in Bangkok
- Country: Thailand
- Province: Bangkok
- Seat: Thawi Watthana
- Khwaeng: 2
- Khet established: 6 March 1998

Area
  - Total: 50.219 km^{2} (19.390 sq mi)

Population (2017)
  - Total: 78,187
  - Density: 1,556.92/km^{2} (4,032.4/sq mi)
- Time zone: UTC+7 (ICT)
- Postal code: 10170
- Geocode: 1048

Thawi Watthana (Thai: ทวีวัฒนา, pronounced [tʰā.wīː wát.tʰā.nāː]) is one of the 50 districts (khet) of Bangkok, Thailand. Its neighbor, clockwise from north, are Bang Kruai district of Nonthaburi province, Taling Chan, Bang Khae, and Nong Khaem Districts of Bangkok, Sam Phran and Phutthamonthon of Nakhon Pathom province.

== History ==
The district is named after Khlong Thawi Watthana, a very long khlong (canal) that runs roughly northwest–southeast through the area. It was a tambon, part of Taling Chan district of Thonburi Province in 1933, considered the western side of Taling Chan. It was promoted to a district effective 6 March 1998.

== Administration ==
The district is divided into two sub-districts (khwaeng).

No.	Name	Thai	Area (km^{2})	Map
1.	Thawi Watthana	ทวีวัฒนา	21.521	Map
2.	Sala Thammasop	ศาลาธรรมสพน์	28.698	Map
Total			50.219	Map

== Places ==
Utthayan Road (ถนนอุทยาน), the road toward Phutthamonthon which is 90 m wide, about 3,861 m long, and divided into the central avenue and two parallel lanes along both sides. The road was planned as part of the grand Phutthamonthon project of Field Marshal Plaek Pibulsonggram, the then prime minister, during the 1950s. The project was stalled when he went out of office and only resumed and opened on 27 February 1999.

Siamese Cat Park (อุทยานแมวไทยโบราณ) is a farm where a rare breed of Siamese cats named Khao Manee (ขาวมณี) are kept and maintained. The cats are white and odd-eyed, i.e., left and right eyes have different colors. The possible eye colors are emerald, yellow sapphire, amber, brown, grey, diamond, blue, and light blue. It descends from royal felines of King Chulalongkorn where only nine were left before the attempt to preserve this breed was initiated by the king. Later, the park was moved to Thawi Watthana Road (ถนนทวีวัฒนา). Now it has closed down.

Thonburi Market aka Sanam Luang Song (ตลาดนัดธนบุรี, สนามหลวง 2) is a market selling agriculture products, gardening, pets, orchids among others. It sells second-hand goods on Monday and Tuesday.

World Market (ตลาดเวิลด์มาร์เก็ต) is a night market next to Thonburi Market selling variety of food.

Thonburi Market Place (ตลาดสดธนบุรี) is a market opened around mid-2022 on Boromratchonnanee Road. The home to shops selling a melange of merchandise, restaurants and food stalls. The market is set on a massive space of over 30 rai (aka approximately 48,000 square meters).

House of Museums (บ้านพิพิธภัณฑ์) is a small museum that displays various kind of shops and their everyday items from around 50 years ago. It is located in Muban Khlong Pho Land, Sala Thammasop Road.

Suksasom Museum (พิพิธภัณฑ์สุขสะสม) is a small museum that displays variety of antiques and film posters with toys totaling more than 300,000 pieces on Phutthamonthon Sai Song Road.

Thawi Watthana Palace aka Dhaveevatthana Palace (พระตำหนักทวีวัฒนา), another official residence of the current King of Thailand, Vajiralongkorn (Rama X).

Bangkokthonburi University (มหาวิทยาลัยกรุงเทพธนบุรี), a private university, the only higher education institution in the district where the indoor arena Chanchai Acadium is located inside.

Thongsook College (วิทยาลัยทองสุข), another private university in the district used to host the World Boxing Championship, where Manny Pacquiao won his first world title in December 1998.

Thonburi Thawiwatthana Hospital aka Thonburi Hospital II (โรงพยาบาลธนบุรี 2), the second branch of Thonburi Hospital, the first private hospital on the Thonburi side.

The Paseo Park (เดอะพาซิโอพาร์ค), a low-rise shopping mall offers restaurants, food stalls, clothing shops and variety of goods on Kanchanaphisek Road.

== Environment ==
Surrounded by green spaces and a suburb not too far from the downtown, Thawi Watthana is often voted the most livable district among the 50 districts of Bangkok.
