= Motorway 81 (Thailand) =

Motorway in Thailand

Motorway Route 81
- ทางหลวงพิเศษหมายเลข 81
- Bang Yai - Kanchanaburi Motorway ถนนสายบางใหญ่-กาญจนบุรี

Route information
- Maintained by Department of Highways (Thailand)
- Length: 96.410 km (59.906 mi)
- Time period: 2016 - present

Major junctions
- East end: AH2/ Bang Yai District, Nonthaburi Province
- West end: Tha Muang District, Kanchanaburi Province

Location
- Country: Thailand
- Provinces: Nonthaburi, Nakhon Pathom, Ratchaburi, Kanchanaburi

Highway system
- Highways in Thailand; Motorways; Asian Highways

The Bang Yai-Kanchanaburi Motorway (Thai: ทางหลวงพิเศษสายยางใหญ่-กาญจนบุรี), designated as Motorway 81 (Thai: ทางหลวงพิเศษหมายเลข 81) is an intercity motorway in Thailand, connecting Nonthaburi province with provinces in Western Thailand. It runs from Bang Yai district in Nonthaburi province to Tha Muang district in Kanchanaburi province, covering a distance of approximately 96 kilometers, Opened in 16 January 2026.

== Routes ==
=== Bang Yai-Kanchanaburi ===

The Bang Yai-Kanchanaburi Road begins at Bang Yai Interchange, the intersection of Kanchanaphisek Road (West) and Rattanathibet Road, in Bang Yai District, Nonthaburi Province. It connects from Rattanathibet Road and heads west, crossing the Tha Chin River, then enter Nakhon Pathom Province, passing through Phutthamonthon District, Nakhon Chai Si District, and Mueang Nakhon Pathom District, then entering Ban Pong District in Ratchaburi Province, before reaching Kanchanaburi Province at Tha Maka District and Tha Muang District before ending near Kanchanaburi at Highway 324.

== Background ==

Motorway 81 was included in the 8th National Economic and Social Development Plan in 1997. The Bang Yai–Ban Pong section was approved by the 53rd Cabinet in 1998, and the Ban Pong–Kanchanaburi section received approval from the 54th Cabinet in 2003. Design studies and field surveys for the Bang Yai–Kanchanaburi section were conducted between 2008 and 2009.

Construction began in 2016; however, detailed field surveys revealed that the number of affected land plots, structures, and trees significantly exceeded initial estimates. Rapid land development and new projects along the alignment had substantially altered land use conditions compared to original assessments. These discrepancies led to a construction halt lasting over two years. Land expropriation compensation was fully disbursed to all 4,571 affected property owners by 20 December 2019. At that time, civil engineering works were only 25.05% complete, falling 56% behind the original schedule.

Following the completion of land acquisition, construction progressed steadily toward completion. The motorway was initially opened for temporary trial runs during select periods. It subsequently opened for 24-hour trial operation on 31 October 2025, prior to its full commercial opening on 16 January 2026.

== Tolls ==
Western Nakhon Pathom Toll Booth

Toll collection on Motorway 81 began on 16 January 2026 following a period of free trial operations that commenced on 31 October 2025. The motorway uses a distance-based tolling system consisting of an entry flag-fall fee plus a rate per kilometer, collected across eight toll plazas along the 96-kilometer (60 mi) route.

Toll rates are categorized by vehicle classification as follows:

- 4-wheel vehicles: ฿10 entry fee + ฿1.50 per km (maximum ฿150 for the full route)
- 6-wheel vehicles: ฿16 entry fee + ฿2.40 per km (maximum ฿240 for the full route)
- Vehicles with more than 6 wheels: ฿23 entry fee + ฿3.45 per km (maximum ฿350 for the full route)

Payment options at the toll plazas include cash, electronic toll tags (M-Pass and Easy Pass), and the barrier-free automated license-plate recognition system (M-Flow).

== Openings ==
=== Temporary Opening ===
- Motorway No. 81 was opened for public trial use for the first time—specifically the section between West Nakhon Pathom and Kanchanaburi—during the 2024 New Year period.
- During the 2024 Songkran festival, the section of Motorway No. 81 connecting Western Nakhon Pathom, Tha Maka, Tha Muang, and Kanchanaburi was opened for a free trial run from April 12 to 17, 2024.
- Following the Songkran period, a trial run—covering the same route segment used during the festival—will commence on April 22, 2024. This service will operate on weekends, running from 2:00 PM on Fridays until 10:00 PM on Sundays, with plans to extend the service as far as Bang Yai.
- Effective October 18, 2024, the free-access period for the 51-kilometer section between the West Nakhon Pathom and Kanchanaburi toll plazas has been extended. The schedule has changed from the previous window of Friday (3:00 PM) to Sunday (9:00 PM) to a new schedule of Friday (3:00 PM) to Monday (12:00 PM).
- During the New Year holiday period—from December 26, 2024, to January 2, 2025—toll-free travel will be available along the entire 96-kilometer route. Access is provided via six toll plazas: Bang Yai, East Nakhon Pathom, West Nakhon Pathom, Tha Maka, Tha Muang, and Kanchanaburi. Following this period, service will revert to the standard operation covering only the section between the West Nakhon Pathom and Kanchanaburi toll booth.
- During the Songkran festival (April 11–17, 2025), the entire 96-kilometer route will be open for toll-free travel, accessible via the same six checkpoints used during the 2025 New Year period. Subsequently, operations will revert to the previous schedule—running from 3:00 PM on Fridays until 12:00 PM on Mondays—before transitioning to the new operating hours of 3:00 PM on Fridays to 9:00 AM on Mondays.
- Following the Songkran festival, starting on May 2, 2025, free travel will be available along the entire route. Access is provided via three toll plazas—Bang Yai, West Nakhon Pathom, and Kanchanaburi—during a new operational window: from 3:00 PM on Fridays until 9:00 AM on Mondays. This initiative is part of the preliminary preparations leading up to the full launch of services.
- To facilitate travel during the long holiday, additional toll-free access is being provided. In addition to the standard toll-free operation along the entire route, seven specific toll plazas are open for entry and exit: Bang Yai, Nakhon Chai Si, Nakhon Pathom (East), Nakhon Pathom (West), Tha Maka, Tha Muang, and Kanchanaburi. The only exception is the Si Sa Thong toll plaza, which remains closed. This toll-free arrangement will be implemented on three separate occasions during the long holiday period, as follows:
  - During the Asalha Puja and Vassa: from 00:01 on Thursday, 10 July 2025, to 09:00 on Monday, 14 July 2025.
  - During the period marking the birthday anniversary of His Majesty King Maha Vajiralongkorn: from 3:00 PM on Friday, July 25, 2025, to 9:00 AM on Tuesday, July 29, 2025.
  - During National Mother's Day period runs from Friday, August 8, 2025, at 3:00 PM to Wednesday, August 13, 2025, at 9:00 AM.
- From August 15, 2025, the number of toll plazas allowing entry and exit during the toll-free period will be increased to seven—the same ones opened during the three long-holiday periods—operating at the same times.
- Free travel along the entire route will be available from 3:00 PM on Friday, August 29, 2025, until 9:00 AM on Wednesday, September 10, 2025. Access is permitted via the seven existing toll plazas to facilitate travel for spectators attending the 2025 Annual King's Cup football tournament at Kanchanaburi Provincial Stadium. After that, service will resume at the usual time.
- To facilitate travel during the long holiday, additional toll-free access is being provided. In addition to the existing toll-free service along the entire route and at the original seven entry/exit points, the Si Sa Thong toll station is also being opened for entry and exit. This additional toll-free arrangement will be implemented twice during the long holiday period, as follows:
  - During the Navamindra Maharaj Day period: from 3:00 PM on Friday, October 10, 2025, to 9:00 AM on Tuesday, October 14, 2025.
  - During the King Chulalongkorn Memorial Day period: from 3:00 PM on Wednesday, October 22, 2025, to 9:00 AM on Monday, October 27, 2025.

=== Full Opening ===
- Soft opening
  - Motorway No. 81 began its soft opening on October 31, 2025, at 00:01, offering 24-hour toll-free access across all eight interchanges. While all vehicle types—beyond just standard four-wheeled cars—are permitted to use the route, a speed limit of 80 km/h is recommended for most vehicles, with the exception of trailers, which are restricted to a maximum speed of 65 km/h.
- Grand Opening
  - Motorway No. 81 fully commenced operations permitting a maximum speed of 120 kilometers per hour and the collection of tolls on January 16, 2026, at 00:01.

== List of facilities ==
Bang Yai−Kanchanaburi Motorway
Location		km	Westbound exits (read up)	Facility		Eastbound exits (read down)	Lanes
Province	District	km	Westbound exits (read up)	English	Thai	Eastbound exits (read down)	Lanes
Nonthaburi	Bang Yai	0.00	Nonthaburi ( Rattanathibet)	Bang Yai Interchange	ทางแยกต่างระดับบางใหญ่	Bang Bua Thong, Lad Lum Kaeo ( AH2 Kanchanaphisek)	4–6
Nonthaburi	Bang Yai	—	Sai Noi (NBT.6027 Road)	—	—	Taling Chan ( AH2 Kanchanaphisek)	4–6
Nonthaburi	Bang Kruai	—	Bang Len (NPT.3004 Road)	—	—	Phutthamonthon ( Phutthamonthon Sai 4)	4–6
Nakhon Pathom	Sam Phran	10.50	Tha Chin River Bridge				4–6
Nakhon Pathom	Nakhon Chai Si	23.22	Don Tum ( Route 3233)	Nakhon Chai Si Interchange	ทางแยกต่างระดับนครชัยศรี	Nakhon Chai Si ( Route 3233)	4–6
Nakhon Pathom	Nakhon Chai Si	28.60	Bang Len, Suphan Buri ( Outer Ring Road 3)	Nakhon Chai Si Junction	ชุมทางต่างระดับนครชัยศรี	Nakhon Chai Si Spur Route	4–6
Nakhon Pathom	Nakhon Chai Si	37.09	Don Tum ( Route 375)	Nakhon Pathom East Interchange	ทางแยกต่างระดับนครปฐมฝั่งตะวันออก	Mueang Nakhon Pathom ( Route 375)	4–6
Nakhon Pathom	Mueang Nakhon Pathom	43.96	Kamphaeng Saen, Suphan Buri ( Malaiman Road)	Nakhon Pathom West Interchange	ทางแยกต่างระดับนครปฐมฝั่งตะวันตก	Mueang Nakhon Pathom ( Malaiman Road)	4–6
Nakhon Pathom	Mueang Nakhon Pathom	49.xx	Proposed Nakhon Pathom Bypass ( Malaiman Road)	Sa Kratiam Interchange	ทางแยกต่างระดับสระกระเทียม	Proposed Nakhon Pathom Bypass ( Phet Kasem Road)	4–6
Kanchanaburi	Tha Maka	63.09	Luk Kae, Huai Krabok ( Route 3394)	Tha Maka Interchange	ทางแยกต่างระดับท่ามะกา	Tha Maka ( Route 3394)	4–6
Kanchanaburi	Tha Maka	77.05	Ban Tha Ruea, Wat Phra Thaen Dong Rang ( Route 3081)	Tha Muang Interchange	ทางแยกต่างระดับท่าม่วง	Tha Muang ( Route 3081)	4–6
Kanchanaburi	Mueang Kanchanaburi	83.30	Under Construction	—	—	Phu Nam Ron Border Checkpoint ( M81 Extension)	4–6
Kanchanaburi	Mueang Kanchanaburi	96.41	Phanom Thuan ( Route 324)	Kanchanaburi Interchange	ทางแยกต่างระดับกาญจนบุรี	Mueang Kanchanaburi ( Route 324)	4–6
Nakhon Chai Si Motorway Spur
Location		km	Westbound exits (read up)	Facility		Eastbound exits (read down)	Lanes
Province	District	km	Westbound exits (read up)	English	Thai	Eastbound exits (read down)	Lanes
Nakhon Pathom	Nakhon Chai Si	0.00	Nonthaburi, Bang Yai ( Main Route)	Nakhon Chai Si Junction	ชุมทางต่างระดับนครชัยศรี	Kanchanaburi ( Main Route)	4
Nakhon Pathom	Nakhon Chai Si	2.00	Nakhon Pathom, Ratchaburi ( Phet Kasem Road)	Sisa Thong Interchange	ทางแยกต่างระดับศีรษะทอง	Nakhon Chai Si, Salaya ( Phet Kasem Road)	4

== See Also ==
- Motorway 9 (Bangkok Outer Ring Road)
- Motorway 6 (Thailand)
- Controlled-access highways in Thailand
