= Nakhon Pathom (disambiguation) =

Nakhon Pathom is a city in Thailand.

Nakhon Pathom may also refer to:

- Nakhon Pathom Province
- Mueang Nakhon Pathom district
