= Lam Phaya Floating Market =

Coordinates: 13.958730°N 100.203292°E

Wat Lam Phaya Floating Market (also called Lam Phaya Floating Market) is a floating market located in front of Lam Phaya temple, on the Tha Chin River.

It was built by the Lam Phaya Cultural District Council, and takes its name from the nearby Lam Phaya Temple. The purpose of this market is to support the community for traditional people to sell products like hand-made goos, vegetables, fruits and clothes. In the market, many locals set up their merchandise on boats, and also in booths along the walkway. Most of the food is traditional Thai food to represent and express how traditional people live. Examples include chicken biryani, grilled with a mixture of rice, herb and spices; and Thai vermicelli, a boiled fish noodle mixed with curry spices. There are also places where tourists can join the fishing activity in front of the Lam Phaya temple.

== History ==
Lam Phaya Floating Market is located on the Lam playa, Banglane, Nakornphratom province. "Lam Phaya" is the name of the village when they are still Bangpla, Nakornchaisri province. In the King Rama 5th period, Phraya Kromta canalized the back of the market for the farmer to do agriculture. This area was separated into two groups: Mon people, who originally came from Samkork in the period of King Rama III (1824-1851), who settled at the west of the river doing agriculture; and the Chinese who settled at the east of the river to do trading. After that, Lam Phaya developed the community to be more famous to increase the income of Lam Phaya people.

== Places in the community ==
According to the urban planning of the town, which is very small, it gives the idea that each place was influenced by the name of the place nearby.

=== Wat Lam Phaya (Lam Phaya Temple) ===
The temple is where Luang Por Mongkol Buddha Mala is located. The statue is made of laterite covered with cement and gold leaf. It was enshrined since the year 2400 BCE for people to worship to bless for the auspicious occasion before shopping in the Lam Phaya Floating Market which is not far away.

=== Architecture of temple ===
The temple has interesting architectural to investigate. Luang Por Mongkol Buddha Mala Statue in the temple is sacred respectable to the Lam Phaya village. The chapel has six doors for entrances and exits. It is made of concrete also facing the Tha Chin River which made it different from other chapels which usually face in the East. The area of the river is regarded as the park of fish. The reason for that is because there are tons of fish that live up there hunting for food. It has become an interesting activity that most tourists like to enjoy.

=== Lam Phaya Temple Folk Floating Market Museum ===
The museum was built to exhibit the lifestyle of folk people who live in the community as a community of cultural integration. It was opened in 2000 with the construction of a Thai house made of wood. There are two floors in the museum. The first floor displays some agriculture tools and the community folk boats. The second floor displays many artisan items (pottery, sculpture) which were made and used by people. It is the place where they collect things like evidence from period to period which explains how the community grew. Most of them were given by people who live in the community.

== Neighbourhoods ==
=== Rattiya City ===
Rattiya City is a retro themed attraction and contemporary market on Tha Chin river that simulates the walls of the Ayutthaya kingdom. It is only 2 km (1.2 mi) from the floating market. This place used to be used as a filming location for many historical movies or TV series such as Sri Ayodhaya on TrueVisions and True4U etc.

=== The Happy Nest ===
Ban Rang Nok, internationally known as The Happy Nest, is before Rattiya City if coming from Wat Lam Phaya floating market. It is a chic café and eatery on the Tha Chin river that operates on the theme of saving the planet and environmentally friendly as well as a community flea market that sells organic, non-toxic products.

== How to get there ==
Getting there by local pickup truck taxi (route Salaya-Rattiya City) from bus station in front of Mahidol University, Salaya (diagonal from entrance of Salaya railway station) costs a fare of 19 baht per person.
