= Phimon Rat =

Phimon Rat Subdistrict ตำบลพิมลราช
- Subdistrict
- Interactive map of Phimon Rat Subdistrict
- Country: Thailand
- Province: Nonthaburi
- District: Bang Bua Thong

Population (2020)
  - Total: 52,684
- Time zone: UTC+7 (ICT)
- Postal code: 11110
- TIS 1099: 120407

Phimon Rat (Thai: พิมลราช, pronounced [pʰí(ʔ).mōn râːt]) is one of the eight subdistricts (tambon) of Bang Bua Thong District, in Nonthaburi Province, Thailand. The subdistrict is bounded by (clockwise from north) Bang Bua Thong, Sano Loi, Lahan, Bang Phlap, Om Kret, Bang Rak Phatthana, Bang Khu Rat, Thawi Watthana and Sai Noi subdistricts. In 2020 it had a total population of 52,684 people.

== Administration ==
=== Central administration ===
The subdistrict is subdivided into 8 administrative villages (muban).

No.	Name	Thai
1.	Ban Khlong Chao	บ้านคลองเจ้า
2.	Ban Fang Nuea	บ้านฝั่งเหนือ
3.	Ban Kluai	บ้านกล้วย
4.	Ban Khai Sam	บ้านค่ายสาม
5.	Ban Rong Suat	บ้านโรงสวด
6.	Ban Sano Loi	บ้านโสนลอย
7.	Ban Rong Krachom	บ้านโรงกระโจม
8.	Ban Khlong Ta Chom	บ้านคลองตาชม

=== Local administration ===
The area of the subdistrict is shared by two local administrative organizations.

- Phimon Rat Town Municipality (เทศบาลเมืองพิมลราช)
- Bang Bua Thong City Municipality (เทศบาลนครบางบัวทอง)
