= Khlong Chedi Bucha =

Canal in Nakhon Pathom, Thailand

Coordinates: 13°49′16″N 100°03′46″E

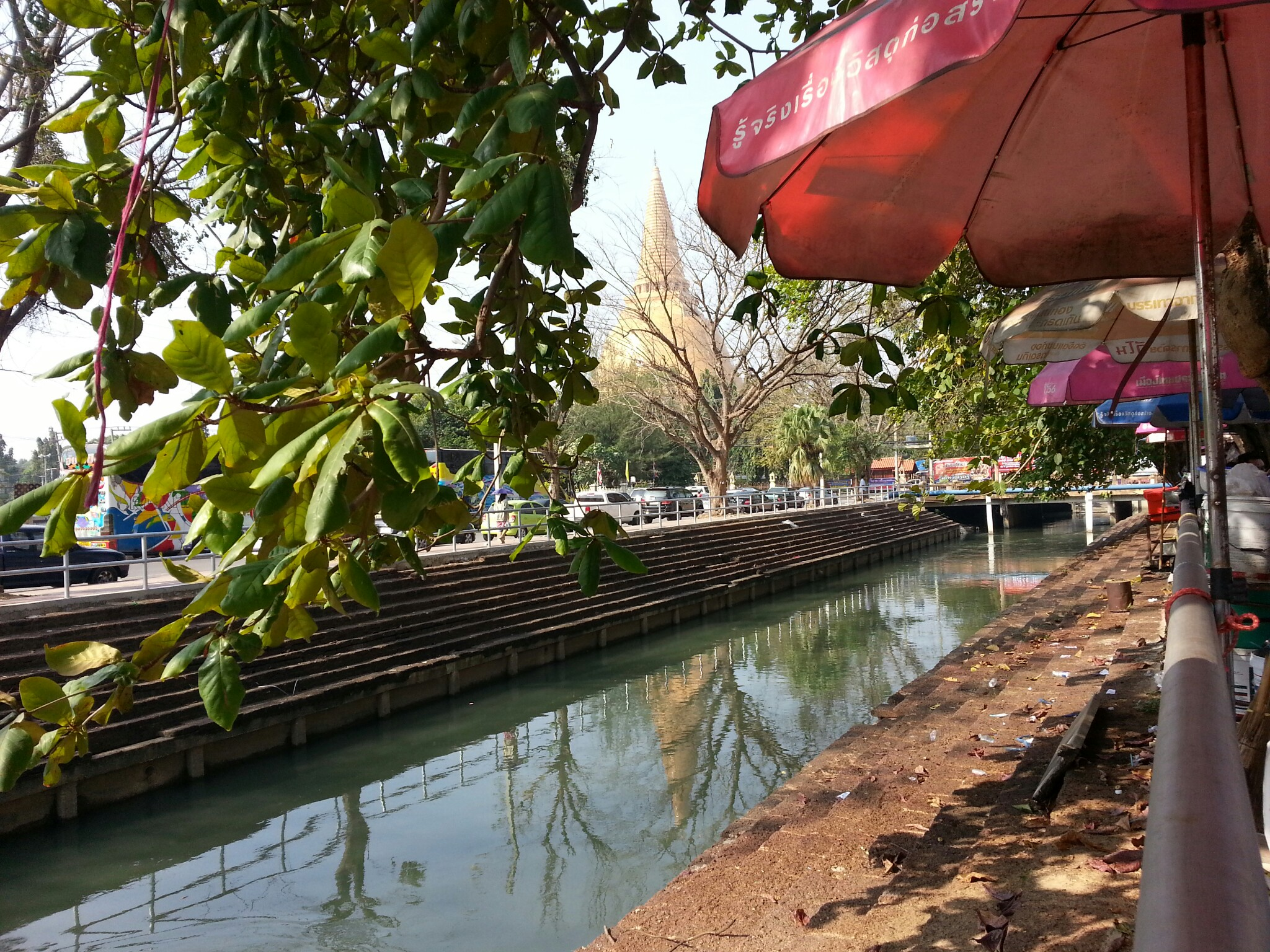
Khlong Chedi Bucha in 2015

Khlong Chedi Bucha (Thai: คลองเจดีย์บูชา, pronounced [kʰlɔ̄ːŋ t͡ɕēː.dīː būː.t͡ɕʰāː]) is a khlong (canal) in central Thailand, sharing a similar origin with Khlong Maha Sawat. Both were dug during the reign of King Mongkut (Rama IV) to shorten travel time for the monarch and pilgrims traveling from Bangkok to pay homage to Phra Pathom Chedi, the country's largest and oldest pagoda and one of its most revered.

After the restoration of Phra Pathom Chedi was completed in 1853 by Somdet Chao Phraya Borom Maha Prayurawongse (Dit Bunnag), King Mongkut ordered the excavation of a canal linking the Nakhon Chai Si River (Tha Chin River) in Nakhon Chai Si District directly to Phra Pathom Chedi in Mueang Nakhon Pathom District, covering a distance of about 18 km (11.2 mi). However, the project stalled after Prayurawongse's death and was later completed by his son, Chao Phraya Thiphakorawong (Kham Bunnag), who employed Chinese laborers. The king personally financed the work, which was finished in 1862, and the canal was royally named "Khlong Chedi Bucha," meaning "Canal to Worship the Pagoda."

In the past, Khlong Chedi Bucha was the principal route between Bangkok and Nakhon Pathom, before the arrival of the railway. At its entrance stood a bustling market and community known as "Talat Tonson" (ตลาดต้นสน, lit. 'pine market'), once a vibrant trading hub where goods from various regions were exchanged. Among the most renowned products was indigo-dyed black fabric, highly popular among farmers of the time. The creation of the canal helped make Nakhon Pathom more prosperous.

King Mongkut also built Pathomnakhon Palace beside the pagoda, with steps leading down to the canal for his visits. Today, only the ruins remain on an open ground next to the chedi. In addition, other markets such as "Talat Lang" (ตลาดล่าง, lit. 'lower market') and "Talat Bon" (ตลาดบน, lit. 'upper market') emerged near the pagoda, with Talat Bon being the first reached when traveling along the canal. These markets are now under the care of the Crown Property Bureau (CPB).

Before 1918, the bridge linking Nakhon Pathom railway station to Phra Pathom Chedi was likely made of wood. It was later rebuilt in reinforced concrete as "Charoen Sattha Bridge" (สะพานเจริญศรัทธา, lit. 'prosperous faith bridge') designed by Prince Narisara Nuwattiwong during the reign of King Vajiravudh (Rama VI).

At present, Khlong Chedi Bucha is no longer a main transportation route, and Talat Tonson has also faded into a quiet, almost forgotten state.
