= Bang Bua Thong subdistrict =

Bang Bua Thong Subdistrict ตำบลบางบัวทอง
- Subdistrict
- Interactive map of Bang Bua Thong Subdistrict
- Country: Thailand
- Province: Nonthaburi
- District: Bang Bua Thong

Population (2020)
  - Total: 62,632
- Time zone: UTC+7 (ICT)
- Postal code: 11110
- TIS 1099: 120402

Bang Bua Thong (Thai: บางบัวทอง, pronounced [bāːŋ būa̯ tʰɔ̄ːŋ]) is one of the eight subdistricts (tambon) of Bang Bua Thong District, in Nonthaburi Province, Thailand. Neighbouring subdistricts are (clockwise from north) Lahan, Phimon Rat, Sano Loi, Phimon Rat and Sai Noi. In 2020, it had a total population of 62,632 people.

== Administration ==
=== Central administration ===
The subdistrict is subdivided into 14 administrative villages (muban).

No.	Name	Thai
1.	Ban Nong Chiang Khot	บ้านหนองเชียงโคตร
2.	Ban Khlong Sam Wang	บ้านคลองสามวัง
3.	Ban Khai Sam	บ้านค่ายสาม
4.	Ban Surao Klang (Ban Rong Suat)	บ้านสุเหร่ากลาง (บ้านโรงสวด)
5.	Ban Sano Loi	บ้านโสนลอย
6.	Ban Pak Khlong Ta Khlai (Ban Khlong Ta Khlai)	บ้านปากคลองตาคล้าย (บ้านคลองตาคล้าย)
7.	Ban Khlong Ta Khlai	บ้านคลองตาคล้าย
8.	Ban Khlong Chek	บ้านคลองเจ๊ก
9.	Ban Khlong Chek Lek (Ban Khlong Chek)	บ้านคลองเจ๊กเล็ก (บ้านคลองเจ๊ก)
10.	Ban Plai Khlong Lam Ri (Ban Khlong Lam Ri)	บ้านปลายคลองลำรี (บ้านคลองลำรี)
11.	Ban Khlong Chek Yai (Ban Khlong Chek)	บ้านคลองเจ๊กใหญ่ (บ้านคลองเจ๊ก)
12.	Ban Khlong Lam Ri	บ้านคลองลำรี
13.	Ban Khlong Sam Wang (Ban Sam Wang)	บ้านคลองสามวัง (บ้านสามวัง)
14.	Ban Khlong Lam Ri Ton Lang (Ban Khlong Lam Ri Lang)	บ้านคลองลำรีตอนล่าง (บ้านคลองลำรีล่าง)

=== Local administration ===
The area of the subdistrict is shared by two local administrative organizations.

- Bang Bua Thong City Municipality (เทศบาลนครบางบัวทอง)
- Mai Bang Bua Thong Town Municipality (เทศบาลเมืองใหม่บางบัวทอง)
