= Khun Si =

Coordinates: 14°00′22″N 100°16′49″E

Khun Si Subdistrict ตำบลขุนศรี
- Subdistrict
- Interactive map of Khun Si Subdistrict
- Country: Thailand
- Province: Nonthaburi
- District: Sai Noi

Area
  - Total: 22 km^{2} (8.5 sq mi)

Population (2020)
  - Total: 5,054
  - Density: 229.73/km^{2} (595.0/sq mi)
- Time zone: UTC+7 (ICT)
- Postal code: 11150
- TIS 1099: 120505

Khun Si (Thai: ขุนศรี, pronounced [kʰǔn sǐː]) is one of the seven subdistricts (tambon) of Sai Noi District, in Nonthaburi Province, Thailand. Neighbouring subdistricts are (from north clockwise) Sai Yai, Rat Niyom, Khlong Khwang, Sai Noi, Thawi Watthana, Naraphirom and Bang Phasi. In 2020 it had a total population of 5,054 people.

== Administration ==
=== Central administration ===
The subdistrict is subdivided into 8 administrative villages (muban).

No.	Name	Thai
1.	Ban Khlong Phra Phimon (Ban Plai Khlong Phra Phimon)	บ้านคลองพระพิมล (บ้านปลายคลองพระพิมล)
2.	Ban Khlong To Nui	บ้านคลองโต๊ะนุ้ย
3.	Ban Khlong Khun Si	บ้านคลองขุนศรี
4.	Ban Khlong Mom Chaem (Ban Wat Samoson)	บ้านคลองหม่อมแช่ม (บ้านวัดสโมสร)
5.	Ban Khlong Phra Phimon Racha (Ban Wat Samoson)	บ้านคลองพระพิมลราชา (บ้านวัดสโมสร)
6.	Ban Wat Yot Phra Phimon	บ้านวัดยอดพระพิมล
7.	Ban Pak Khlong Chao	บ้านปากคลองเจ้า
8.	Ban Khlong Sip Sok (Ban Khlong Thap)	บ้านคลองสิบศอก (บ้านคลองทับ)

=== Local administration ===
The whole area of the subdistrict is covered by Khun Si Subdistrict Administrative Organization (องค์การบริหารส่วนตำบลขุนศรี).
