= Sai Noi district =

Sai Noi ไทรน้อย
- District
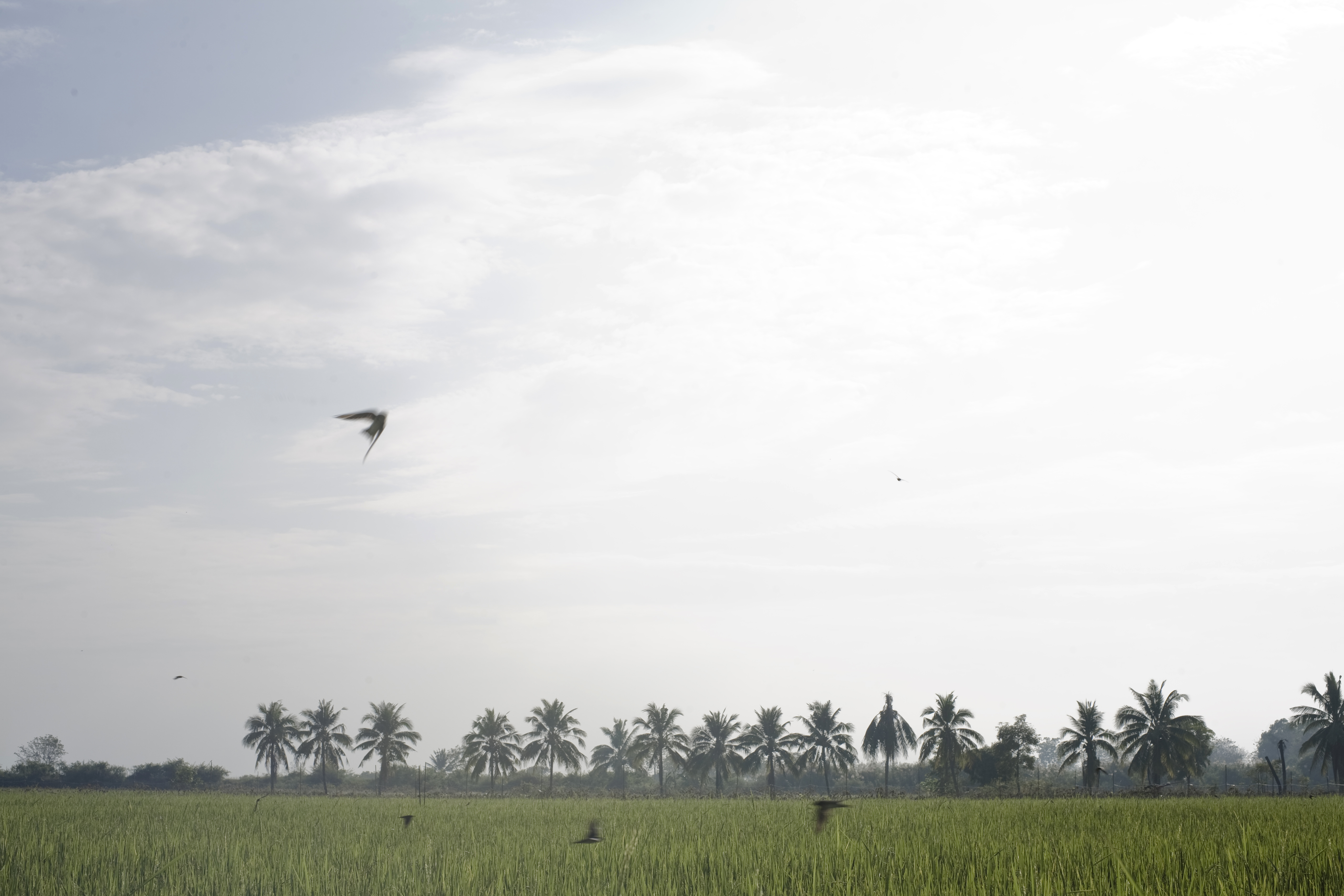
- Rice field, Sai Noi District
- Interactive map of Sai Noi
- Country: Thailand
- Province: Nonthaburi
- Seat: Khlong Khwang
- Tambon: 7
- Muban: 68
- District established: 1 January 1948

Area
  - Total: 186.0 km^{2} (71.8 sq mi)

Population (2025)
  - Total: 79,185
  - Density: 425/km^{2} (1,100/sq mi)
- Time zone: UTC+7 (ICT)
- Postal code: 11150
- Calling code: 02
- ISO 3166 code: TH-1205

Sai Noi (Thai: ไทรน้อย, pronounced [sāj nɔ́ːj]) is the northwesternmost district (amphoe) of Nonthaburi province, central Thailand.

== Geography ==
Neighboring districts are (from the north clockwise): Lat Bua Luang (Phra Nakhon Si Ayutthaya province); Lat Lum Kaeo (Pathum Thani province); Bang Bua Thong, Bang Yai, and the districts Phutthamonthon and Bang Len of Nakhon Pathom province.

== History ==
At first the area was administered from Bang Bua Thong District. On 1 January 1948 four sub-districts were split off to form the new minor district (king amphoe) Sai Noi. On 6 June 1956 it was elevated to full district status.

In 1959 Tambon Khun Si was transferred from Bang Len District (Nakhon Pathom) to become part of Sai Noi. In 1979 the southern part of Tambon Rat Niyom formed the new tambon, Khlong Khwang. The following year the southern part of Tambon Sai Noi was split off to create Tambon Thawi Watthana.

== Religion ==
There are total fifteen Theravada Buddhist temples in the district, of which fourteen Maha Nikai and one Dhammayut temples.
Further there are two Christian churches and two Mosques in the district.

== Administrative divisions ==
District location in Nonthaburi province

Map of district with seven municipalities

=== Provincial government ===
The district is divided into seven subdistricts (tambons), which are further subdivided into 68 villages (mubans).

	Subdistricts	People	Villages
1	Sai Noi	33,966	11
2	Rat Niyom	7,117	8
3	Nong Phrao Ngai	8,266	12
4	Sai Yai	6,501	11
5	Khun Si	5,264	8
6	Khong Khwang	8,273	10
7	Thawi Watthana	9,798	8
	Total	79,185	68

=== Local government ===
There are total seven municipalities of which Sai Noi town (thesaban mueang) status and six subdistrict (thesaban tambon) status.
Sai Noi subdistrict municipality covers the remaining area of Sai Noi district and part of Khlong Khwang subdistrict. Khlong Khwang subdistrict municipality covers the most parts of the same-named subdistrict. Thawi Watthana, Nong Phrao Ngai, Sai Yai and Khun Si cover the whole same-named subdistricts.

Sai Noi town municipality	31,993

Thawi Watthana subd.mun.	9,798
Nong Phrao Ngai subd.mun.	8,266
Khlong Khwang subd.mun.	7,610
Sai Yai subd.mun.	6,501
Khun Si subd.mun.	5,264
Sai Noi subd.mun.	2,606

The non-municipal area is administered by one Subdistrict Administrative Organization - SAO (ongkan borihan suan tambon - oh boh toh).

Rat Niyom SAO	7,117

== Education ==
Educational institutions from primary to vocational education in the district is as follows:

=== Vocational education ===
- Nonthaburi Technical College.

=== Secondary education ===
- Total three upper secondary schools with 1,558 students.
- Total four lower secondary schools with 2,765 students.

=== Primary education ===
- Total fifteen primary schools with 4,785 pupils.

== Health ==
=== Government hospital ===
There is one community hospital in Sai Noi district.

- Sai Noi Hospital with 60 beds.

=== Health promoting hospitals ===
There are total eleven health-promoting hospitals in the district.

=== Clinics ===
Around 9 clinics are in Sai Noi district.
