= Lahan, Nonthaburi =

Lahan Subdistrict ตำบลละหาร
- Subdistrict
- Interactive map of Lahan Subdistrict
- Country: Thailand
- Province: Nonthaburi
- District: Bang Bua Thong

Area
  - Total: 18.16 km^{2} (7.01 sq mi)

Population (2020)
  - Total: 24,767
  - Density: 1,363.82/km^{2} (3,532.3/sq mi)
- Time zone: UTC+7 (ICT)
- Postal code: 11110
- TIS 1099: 120405

Lahan (Thai: ละหาร, pronounced [lā.hǎːn]) is one of the eight subdistricts (tambon) of Bang Bua Thong District, in Nonthaburi Province, Thailand. The subdistrict is bounded by (clockwise from north) Namai, Khlong Khoi, Lam Pho, Khlong Khoi, Bang Phlap, Phimon Rat, Bang Bua Thong, Sai Noi, Khlong Khwang and Rat Niyom subdistricts. In 2020 it had a total population of 24,767 people.

== Administration ==
=== Central administration ===
The subdistrict is subdivided into 9 administrative villages (muban).

No.	Name	Thai
1.	Ban Thanon Rot (Ban Khlong Lak Khon Nuea)	บ้านถนนรถ (บ้านคลองลากค้อนเหนือ)
2.	Ban Surao Lam Ri	บ้านสุเหร่าลำรี
3.	Ban Ko Loi (Ban Lahan)	บ้านเกาะลอย (บ้านละหาร)
4.	Ban Ko Don	บ้านเกาะดอน
5.	Ban Khlong Lak Khon	บ้านคลองลากค้อน
6.	Ban Lak Khon	บ้านลากค้อน
7.	Ban Surao Daeng	บ้านสุเหร่าแดง
8.	Ban Lam Ri	บ้านลำรี
9.	Ban Khlong Lam Ri	บ้านคลองลำรี

=== Local administration ===
The whole area of the subdistrict is covered by Lahan Subdistrict Administrative Organization (องค์การบริหารส่วนตำบลละหาร).
