= Lam Pho =

Lam Pho Subdistrict ตำบลลำโพ
- Subdistrict
- Interactive map of Lam Pho Subdistrict
- Coordinates: 13°58′26.8″N 100°24′33.8″E
- Country: Thailand
- Province: Nonthaburi
- District: Bang Bua Thong

Area
  - Total: 12.03 km^{2} (4.64 sq mi)

Population (2020)
  - Total: 13,094
  - Density: 1,088.45/km^{2} (2,819.1/sq mi)
- Time zone: UTC+7 (ICT)
- Postal code: 11110
- TIS 1099: 120406

Lam Pho (Thai: ลำโพ, pronounced [lām pʰōː]) is one of the eight subdistricts (tambon) of Bang Bua Thong District, in Nonthaburi Province, Thailand. Neighbouring subdistricts are (clockwise from north) Khlong Khoi and Lahan. In 2020 it had a total population of 13,094 people.

== Administration ==
=== Central administration ===
The subdistrict is subdivided into 8 administrative villages (muban).

No.	Name	Thai
1.	Ban Lak Khon Nuea (Ban Khlong Lak Khon Nuea)	บ้านลากค้อนเหนือ (บ้านคลองลากค้อนเหนือ)
2.	Ban Lam Pho	บ้านลำโพ
3.	Ban Lam Pho	บ้านลำโพ
4.	Ban Lam Pho	บ้านลำโพ
5.	Ban San Chao	บ้านศาลเจ้า
6.	Ban Hua Khu	บ้านหัวคู้
7.	Ban Lak Khon (Ban Lam Pho)	บ้านลากค้อน (บ้านลำโพ)
8.	Ban Sam Yaek	บ้านสามแยก

=== Local administration ===
The whole area of the subdistrict is covered by Lam Pho Subdistrict Administrative Organization (องค์การบริหารส่วนตำบลลำโพ).
