= Khlong Khwang subdistrict, Nonthaburi =

Khlong Khwang Subdistrict ตำบลคลองขวาง
- Subdistrict
- Interactive map of Khlong Khwang Subdistrict
- Country: Thailand
- Province: Nonthaburi
- District: Sai Noi

Population (2020)
  - Total: 6,880
- Time zone: UTC+7 (ICT)
- Postal code: 11150
- TIS 1099: 120506

Khlong Khwang (Thai: คลองขวาง, pronounced [kʰlɔ̄ːŋ kʰwǎːŋ]) is one of the seven subdistricts (tambon) of Sai Noi District, in Nonthaburi Province, Thailand. The subdistrict is bounded by (clockwise from north) Rat Niyom, Lahan, Sai Noi and Khun Si subdistricts. In 2020 it had a total population of 6,880 people.

== Administration ==
=== Central administration ===
The subdistrict is subdivided into 10 administrative villages (muban).

No.	Name	Thai
1.	Ban Pak Khlong Ha Roi (Ban Khlong Phra Phimon)	บ้านปากคลองห้าร้อย (บ้านคลองพระพิมล)
2.	Ban Khlong Ha Roi	บ้านคลองห้าร้อย
3.	Ban Khlong Khwang	บ้านคลองขวาง
4.	Ban Khlong Khwang	บ้านคลองขวาง
5.	Ban Khlong Khwang	บ้านคลองขวาง
6.	Ban Khlong Khwang	บ้านคลองขวาง
7.	Ban Krathum Rai (Ban Rat Niyom Krathum Rai)	บ้านกระทุ่มราย (บ้านราษฎร์นิยมกระทุ่มราย)
8.	Ban Khlong Khun Si	บ้านคลองขุนศรี
9.	Ban Khlong Phra Phimon (Ban Pak Khlong Khun Si)	บ้านคลองพระพิมล (บ้านปากคลองขุนศรี)
10.	Ban Khlong Na Mon (Ban Na Mon Hok Lang)	บ้านคลองนาหมอน (บ้านนาหมอนหกหลัง)

=== Local administration ===
The area of the subdistrict is shared by two local administrative organizations.

- Sai Noi Subdistrict Municipality (เทศบาลตำบลไทรน้อย)
- Khlong Khwang Subdistrict Administrative Organization (องค์การบริหารส่วนตำบลคลองขวาง)
