= Thawi Watthana subdistrict, Nonthaburi =

Thawi Watthana Subdistrict ตำบลทวีวัฒนา
- Subdistrict
- Interactive map of Thawi Watthana Subdistrict
- Country: Thailand
- Province: Nonthaburi
- District: Sai Noi

Area
  - Total: 23.65 km^{2} (9.13 sq mi)

Population (2020)
  - Total: 8,862
  - Density: 374.71/km^{2} (970.5/sq mi)
- Time zone: UTC+7 (ICT)
- Postal code: 11150
- TIS 1099: 120507

Thawi Watthana (Thai: ทวีวัฒนา, pronounced [tʰā.wīː wát.tʰā.nāː]) is one of the seven subdistricts (tambon) of Sai Noi District, in Nonthaburi Province, Thailand. The subdistrict is bounded by (clockwise from north) Khun Si, Sai Noi, Phimon Rat, Bang Khu Rat, Nong Phrao Ngai and Naraphirom subdistricts. In 2020 it had a total population of 8,862 people.

== Administration ==
=== Central administration ===
The subdistrict is subdivided into 8 administrative villages (muban).

No.	Name	Thai
1.	Ban Khlong Chao Thawi Watthana	บ้านคลองเจ้าทวีวัฒนา
2.	Ban Khlong Chao Thawi Watthana	บ้านคลองเจ้าทวีวัฒนา
3.	Ban Khlong Sam	บ้านคลองสาม
4.	Ban Khlong Song	บ้านคลองสอง
5.	Ban Khlong Nueng	บ้านคลองหนึ่ง
6.	Ban Khlong Masong	บ้านคลองมะสง
7.	Ban Khlong Ta Chom	บ้านคลองตาชม
8.	Ban Khlong Masong (Ban Plai Khlong Masong)	บ้านคลองมะสง (บ้านปลายคลองมะสง)

=== Local administration ===
The whole area of the subdistrict is covered by Thawi Watthana Subdistrict Administrative Organization (องค์การบริหารส่วนตำบลทวีวัฒนา).
