= Sano Loi =

Coordinates: 13°54′44″N 100°25′12″E

Sano Loi Subdistrict ตำบลโสนลอย
- Subdistrict
- Interactive map of Sano Loi Subdistrict
- Country: Thailand
- Province: Nonthaburi
- District: Bang Bua Thong

Population (2020)
  - Total: 9,245
- Time zone: UTC+7 (ICT)
- Postal code: 11110
- TIS 1099: 120401

Sano Loi (Thai: โสนลอย, pronounced [sā.nǒː lɔ̄ːj]) is one of the eight subdistricts (tambon) of Bang Bua Thong District, in Nonthaburi Province, Thailand. The subdistrict is surrounded by Bang Bua Thong and Phimon Rat subdistricts. The whole area of the subdistrict is covered by Bang Bua Thong Town Municipality (เทศบาลเมืองบางบัวทอง). In 2020 it had a total population of 9,245 people.
