= Sai Yai =

Sai Yai Subdistrict ตำบลไทรใหญ่
- Subdistrict
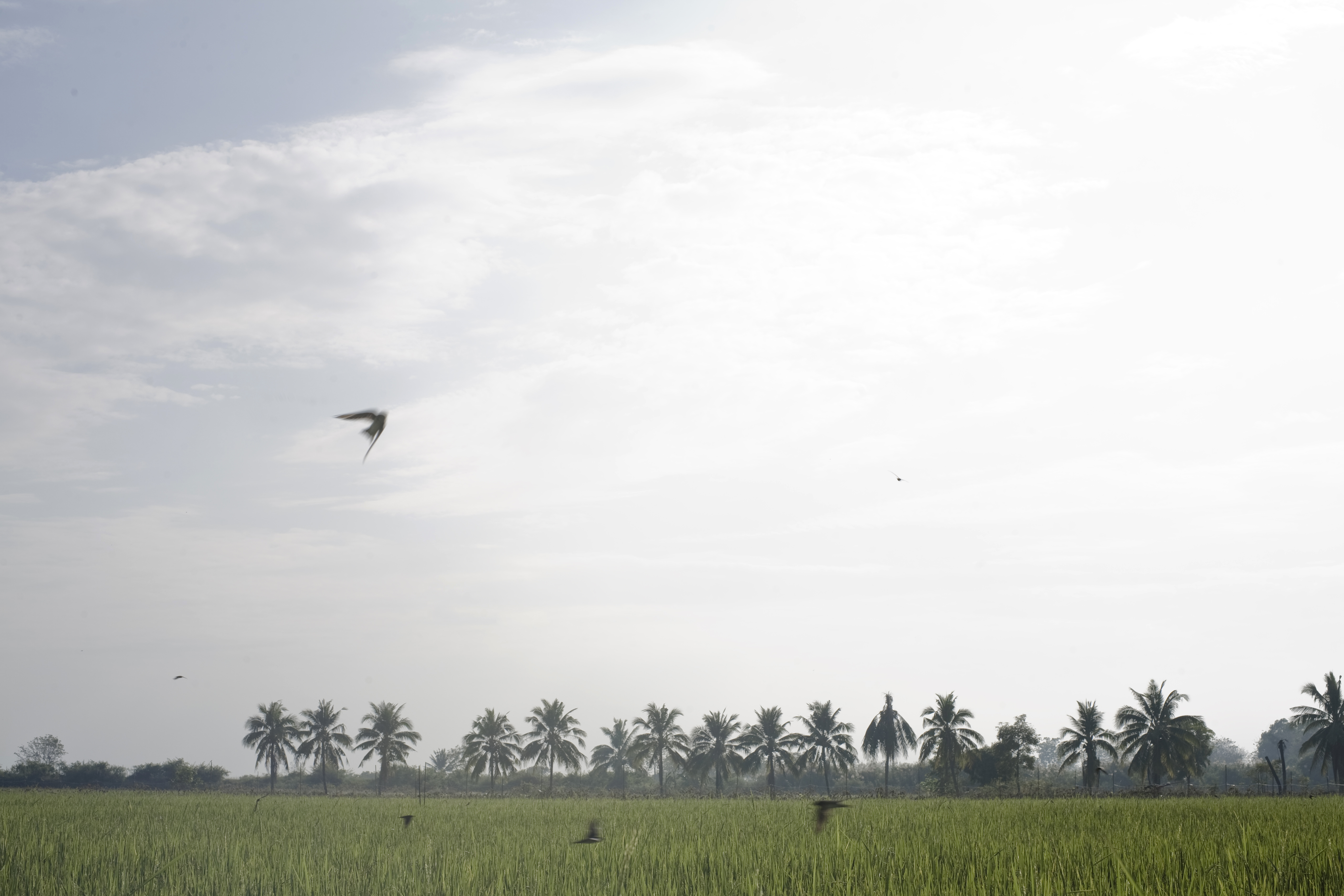
- A rice field in the south of the subdistrict
- Interactive map of Sai Yai Subdistrict
- Coordinates: 14°05′13″N 100°17′37″E
- Country: Thailand
- Province: Nonthaburi
- District: Sai Noi

Area
  - Total: 43 km^{2} (17 sq mi)

Population (2020)
  - Total: 6,400
  - Density: 148.84/km^{2} (385.5/sq mi)
- Time zone: UTC+7 (ICT)
- Postal code: 11150
- TIS 1099: 120504

Sai Yai (Thai: ไทรใหญ่, pronounced [sāj jàj]) is one of the seven subdistricts (tambon) of Sai Noi District, in Nonthaburi Province, Thailand. Neighbouring subdistricts are (from north clockwise) Sam Mueang, Rat Niyom, Khun Si, Bang Phasi, Sai Ngam and Ninlaphet. In 2020 it had a total population of 6,400 people.

== Administration ==
=== Central administration ===
The subdistrict is subdivided into 11 administrative villages (muban).

No.	Name	Thai
1.	Ban Krathum Muet	บ้านกระทุ่มมืด
2.	Ban Chao Fueang	บ้านเจ้าเฟื่อง
3.	Ban Plai Khlong Khun Si	บ้านปลายคลองขุนศรี
4.	Ban Bang O	บ้านบางโอ
5.	Ban Sai Yai	บ้านไทรใหญ่
6.	Ban Sam Mueang	บ้านสามเมือง
7.	Ban Ming Khwan	บ้านมิ่งขวัญ
8.	Ban Khlong Song	บ้านคลองสอง
9.	Ban Mom Chaem (Ban Khlong Mom Chaem)	บ้านหม่อมแช่ม (บ้านคลองหม่อมแช่ม)
10.	Ban Khlong Nueng	บ้านคลองหนึ่ง
11.	Ban Mai	บ้านใหม่

=== Local administration ===
The whole area of the subdistrict is covered by Sai Yai Subdistrict Administrative Organization (องค์การบริหารส่วนตำบลไทรใหญ่).
