= Rat Niyom =

Rat Niyom Subdistrict ตำบลราษฎร์นิยม
- Subdistrict
- Interactive map of Rat Niyom Subdistrict
- Country: Thailand
- Province: Nonthaburi
- District: Sai Noi

Area
  - Total: 35.15 km^{2} (13.57 sq mi)

Population (2020)
  - Total: 6,759
  - Density: 192.29/km^{2} (498.0/sq mi)
- Time zone: UTC+7 (ICT)
- Postal code: 11150
- TIS 1099: 120502

Rat Niyom (Thai: ราษฎร์นิยม, pronounced [râːt ní(ʔ).jōm]) is one of the seven subdistricts (tambon) of Sai Noi District, in Nonthaburi Province, Thailand. The subdistrict is bounded by (clockwise from north) Sam Mueang, Bo Ngoen, Namai, Lahan, Khlong Khwang, Khun Si and Sai Yai subdistricts. In 2020 it had a total population of 6,759 people.

== Administration ==
=== Central administration ===
The subdistrict is subdivided into 8 administrative villages (muban).

No.	Name	Thai
1.	Ban Khlong Khun Si	บ้านคลองขุนศรี
2.	Ban Rat Niyom	บ้านราษฎร์นิยม
3.	Ban Rat Niyom	บ้านราษฎร์นิยม
4.	Ban Lak Khon (Ban Khlong Lak Khon)	บ้านลากค้อน (บ้านคลองลากค้อน)
5.	Ban Lak Khon (Ban Khlong Lak Khon)	บ้านลากค้อน (บ้านคลองลากค้อน)
6.	Ban Rat Niyom	บ้านราษฎร์นิยม
7.	Ban Lak Khon (Ban Khlong Lak Khon)	บ้านลากค้อน (บ้านคลองลากค้อน)
8.	Ban Khlong Na Mon	บ้านคลองนาหมอน

=== Local administration ===
The whole area of the subdistrict is covered by Rat Niyom Subdistrict Administrative Organization (องค์การบริหารส่วนตำบลราษฎร์นิยม).
