= Don Tum district =

Don Tum ดอนตูม
- District
- District location in Nakhon Pathom province
- Coordinates: 13°57′38″N 100°4′53″E
- Country: Thailand
- Province: Nakhon Pathom
- Seat: Sam Ngam

Area
  - Total: 171.354 km^{2} (66.160 sq mi)

Population (2017)
  - Total: 48,625
  - Density: 283.76/km^{2} (734.9/sq mi)
- Time zone: UTC+7 (ICT)
- Postal code: 73150
- Geocode: 7304

Don Tum (Thai: ดอนตูม, pronounced [dɔ̄ːn tūːm]) is a district (amphoe) in the northern part of Nakhon Pathom province, central Thailand.

== Etymology ==
The words Don and Tum in Thai mean 'land at a slightly high elevation'. Due to this, the district has never had problems with flooding.

== History ==
Mueang Tum was an ancient city of the Srivijaya kingdom. The first official district name of this area was Sam Kaeo. Later it was renamed Kamphaeng Saen District.

The minor district (king amphoe) Don Tum was created on 1 January 1966, when seven tambon were split from Kamphaeng Saen District. It was officially upgraded to be a full district on 12 March 1969.

== Geography ==
Neighboring districts are (from the north clockwise) Bang Len, Nakhon Chai Si, Mueang Nakhon Pathom and Kamphaeng Saen.

== Administration ==
The district is divided into eight subdistricts (tambons), which are further subdivided into 68 villages (mubans). The township (thesaban tambon) Sam Ngam covers tambon Sam Ngam. Each of the other seven tambon has a tambon administrative organization (TAO).

No.	Name	Thai name	Villages
1.	Sam Ngam	สามง่าม	12
2.	Huai Phra	ห้วยพระ	8
3.	Lam Hoei	ลำเหย	15
4.	Don Phutsa	ดอนพุทรา	10
5.	Ban Luang	บ้านหลวง	5
6.	Don Ruak	ดอนรวก	5
7.	Huai Duan	ห้วยด้วน	7
8.	Lam Luk Bua	ลำลูกบัว	6

== Population ==
As 2023, Don Tum has a population of about 50,000 people.

== Economy ==
Most of Don Tum is an agricultural area, but some of the population is engaged in junk trade. Some parts of the profession produce cheap clothes to Pratunam Market, Bangkok.
