= Bang Bua Thong district =

Bang Bua Thong บางบัวทอง
- District
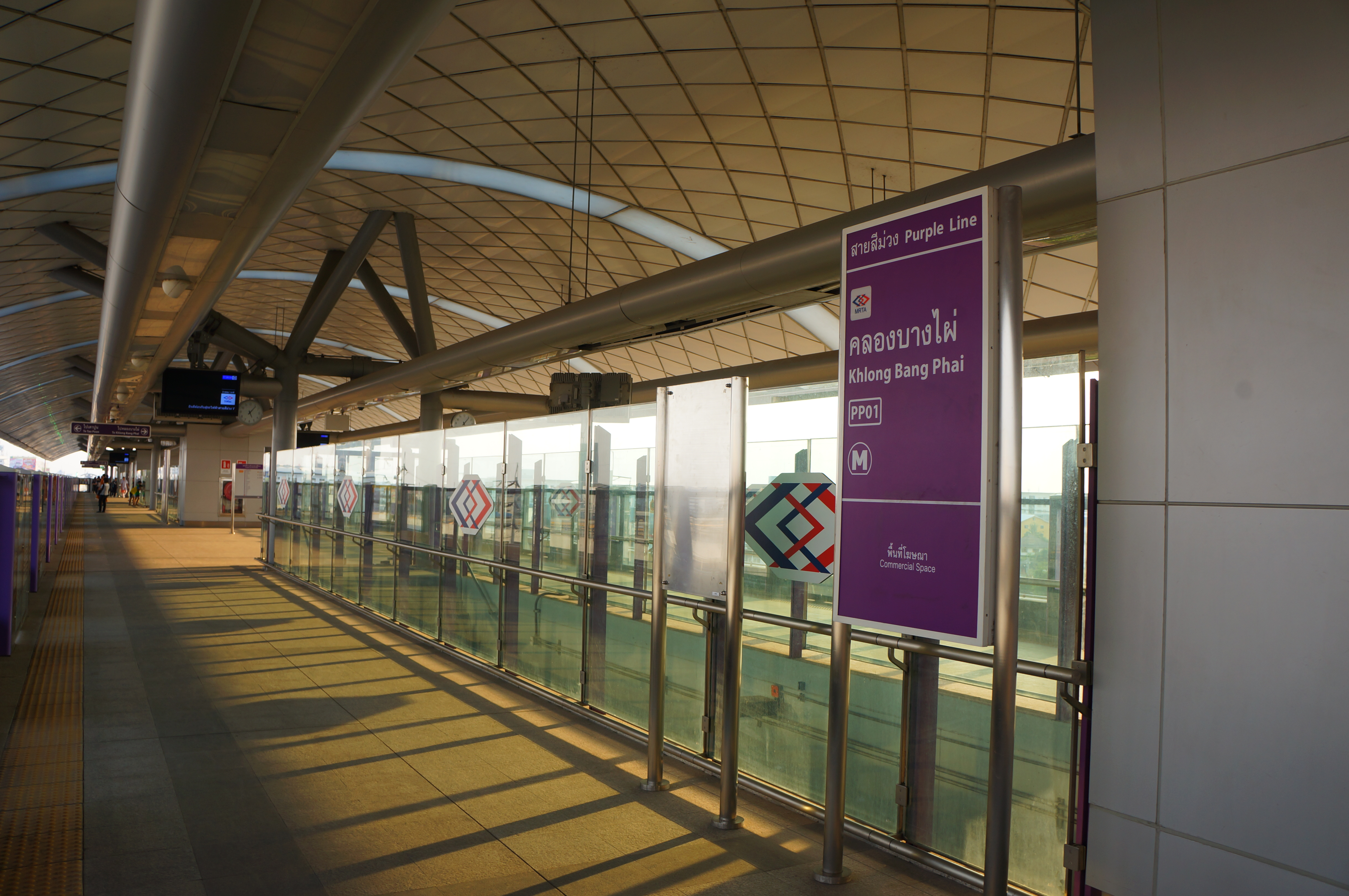
- Khlong Bang Phai MRT station, the northern terminus of MRT Purple Line, Bang Rak Phatthana.
- Interactive map of Bang Bua Thong
- Country: Thailand
- Province: Nonthaburi
- Seat: Lahan
- Tambon: 8
- Muban: 81
- District established: 1902

Area
  - Total: 116.4 km^{2} (44.9 sq mi)

Population (2025)
  - Total: 299,858
  - Density: 2,576/km^{2} (6,670/sq mi)
- Time zone: UTC+7
- Postal code: 11110
- Calling code: 02
- ISO 3166 code: TH-1204

Bang Bua Thong (Thai: บางบัวทอง, pronounced [bāːŋ būa̯ tʰɔ̄ːŋ]) is a district (amphoe) of Nonthaburi province, central Thailand.

== Geography ==
Neighbouring districts are (from north clockwise) Lat Lum Kaeo (Pathum Thani province), Pak Kret, Mueang Nonthaburi, Sai Noi, and Bang Yai.

== Religion ==
There are total fourteen Theravada Buddhist temples in the district, of which thirteen Maha Nikai and one Dhammayut temples.
Further there are seven Christian churches and eleven Mosques in the district.

== Administrative divisions ==
District location in Nonthaburi province

Map of district with seven municipalities

=== Provincial government ===
The district is divided into eight subdistricts (tambons), which are further subdivided into 81 villages (mubans).

	Subdistricts	People	Villages
1	Sano Loi	8,543	6
2	Bang Bua Thong	65,112	14
3	Bang Rak Yai	9,728	11
4	Bang Khu Rat	41,558	10
5	Lahan	27,892	9
6	Lam Pho	15,473	8
7	Phimon Rat	57,342	8
8	Bang Rak Phatthana	74,210	15
	Total	299,858	81

=== Local government ===
There are seven total municipalities in Bang Bua Thong with one city municipality (thesaban nakhon) and six town municipalities (thesaban mueang).
Bang Bua Thong city municipality covers the entirety of Sano Loi subdistrict and includes part of Bang Rak Phatthana, Bang Bua Thong, Phimon Rat and Bang Rak Yai subdistricts.
Mai Bang Bua Thong, Bang Khu Rat, Lahan and Lam Pho town municipalities cover the whole same-named subdistricts.
Phimon Rat, Bang Rak Phatthana and Bang Rak Yai town municipalities cover the remaining areas of the same-named subdistricts.

Bang Bua Thong city municipality	52,518
Bang Rak Phatthana subdistrict	28,145
Sano Loi subdistrict	8,543
Bang Bua Thong subdistrict	7,364
Phimon Rat subdistrict	4,742
Bang Rak Yai subdistrict	3,724

Mai Bang Bua Thong town mun.	57,748
Phimon Rat bisected town mun.	52,600
Bang Rak Phatthana town mun.	46,065
Bang Khu Rat town municipality	41,558
Lahan town municipality	27,892
Lam Pho town municipality	15,473

The non-municipal area is administered by one Subdistrict Administrative Organization - SAO (ongkan borihan suan tambon - oh boh toh).

== Education ==
Educational institutions from primary to vocational education in the district is as follows:

=== Vocational education ===
- Dusit Commercial College Nonthaburi.

=== Secondary education ===
- Total five upper secondary schools with 2,265 students.
- Total six lower secondary schools with 4,152 students.

=== Primary education ===
- Total twenty primary schools with 13,775 pupils.

== Health ==
=== Government hospital ===
There are two community hospitals in Bang Bua Thong district.

- Bang Bua Thong Hospital with 102 beds.
- Phimon Rat Hospital with 30 beds.

=== Private hospital ===
There are two private hospitals in the district:

- Kasemrad Hospital Rattanathibeth with 119 beds.
- Chollada Hospital with 59 beds.

=== Health promoting hospitals ===
There are total fifteen health-promoting hospitals in the district.

=== Clinics ===
Around 93 clinics are in Bang Bua Thong district.
