= Kamphaeng Saen district =

Kamphaeng Saen กำแพงแสน
- District
- District location in Nakhon Pathom province
- Coordinates: 13°59′2″N 99°59′38″E
- Country: Thailand
- Province: Nakhon Pathom

Area
  - Total: 405.019 km^{2} (156.379 sq mi)

Population (2017)
  - Total: 129,081
  - Density: 318.7/km^{2} (825/sq mi)
- Time zone: UTC+7 (ICT)
- Postal code: 73140
- Geocode: 7302

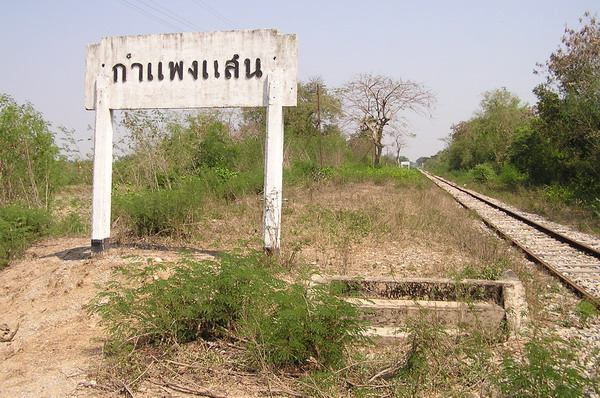
Kamphaeng Saen station

Kamphaeng Saen (Thai: กำแพงแสน, pronounced [kām.pʰɛ̄ːŋ sɛ̌ːn]) is the northwesternmost district (amphoe) of Nakhon Pathom province, central Thailand.

== History ==
Kamphaeng Saen was a moated centre of Dvaravati culture, dating from 410-870 CE, with the foundation of a Buddhist stupa identified. A stone wheel of the law has been excavated in the district. A square socle from Kamphaeng Saen, now in the Nakhon Pathom National Museum, carries a Pali verse on the knowledge of the four realities, in a script of the Dvaravati period.

== Geography ==
Neighbouring districts are (from the north clockwise): Song Phi Nong of Suphanburi province; Bang Len, Don Tum, and Mueang Nakhon Pathom of Nakhon Pathom Province; Ban Pong of Ratchaburi province; and Tha Maka of Kanchanaburi province.

Kasetsart University's Kamphaeng Saen campus is in this district.

== Administration ==
The district is divided into 15 subdistricts (tambons), which are further subdivided into 202 villages (mubans). Kamphaeng Saen is also a township (thesaban tambon), which covers parts of tambons Kamphaeng Saen and Thung Kraphang Hom.

1.	Thung Kraphang Hom	ทุ่งกระพังโหม
2.	Kratip	กระตีบ
3.	Thung Luk Nok	ทุ่งลูกนก
4.	Huai Khwang	ห้วยขวาง
5.	Thung Khwang	ทุ่งขวาง
6.	Sa Si Mum	สระสี่มุม
7.	Thung Bua	ทุ่งบัว
8.	Don Khoi	ดอนข่อย
9.	Sa Phatthana	สระพัฒนา
10.	Huai Mon Thong	ห้วยหมอนทอง
11.	Huai Muang	ห้วยม่วง
12.	Kamphaeng Saen	กำแพงแสน
13.	Rang Phikun	รางพิกุล
14.	Nong Krathum	หนองกระทุ่ม
15.	Wang Nam Khiao	วังน้ำเขียว
