= Sai Noi subdistrict, Nonthaburi =

Sai Noi Subdistrict ตำบลไทรน้อย
- Subdistrict
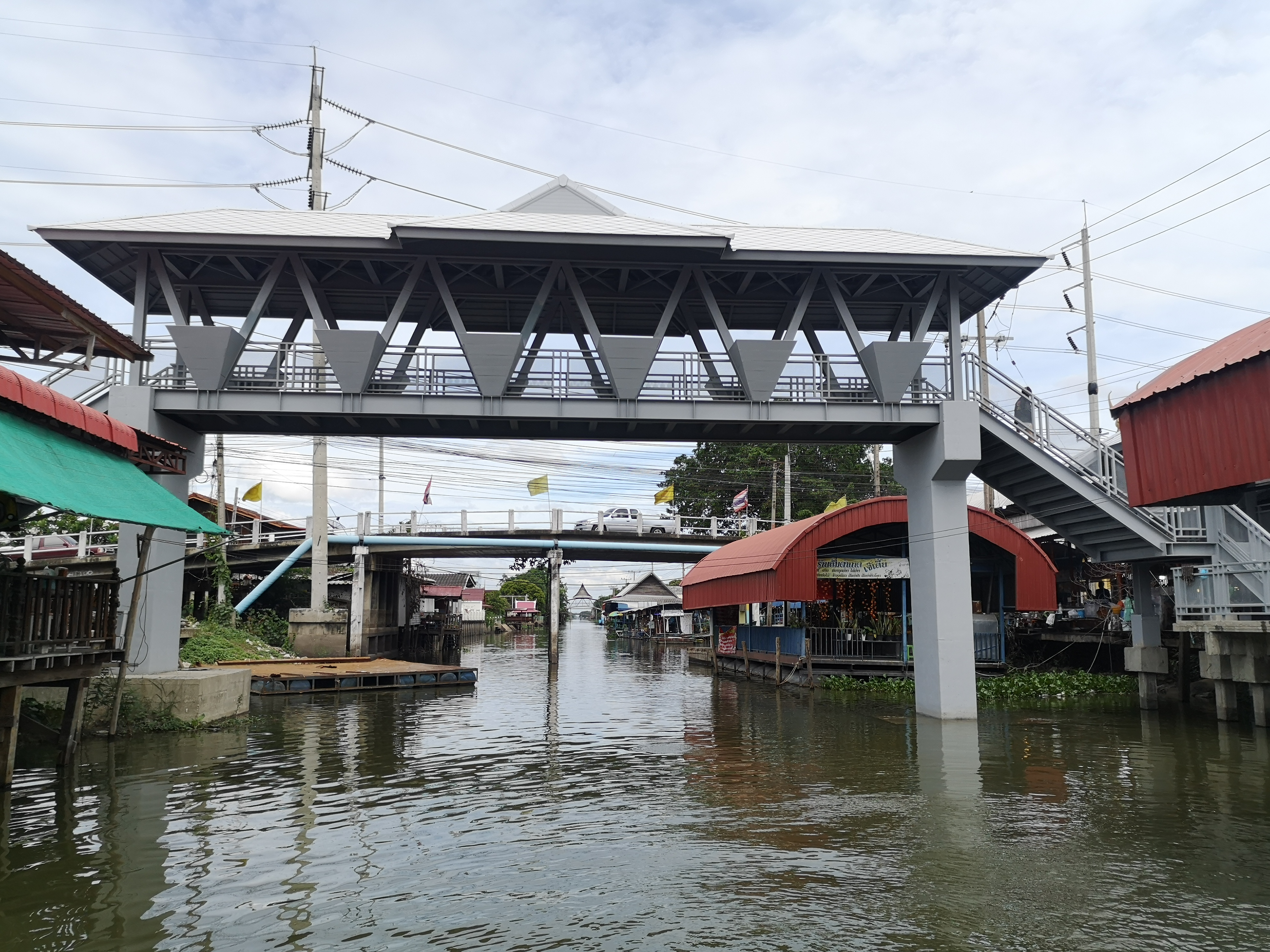
- Khlong Phra Phimon in the area of Wat Sai Yai, Sai Noi subdistrict
- Interactive map of Sai Noi Subdistrict
- Country: Thailand
- Province: Nonthaburi
- District: Sai Noi

Population (2020)
  - Total: 29,256
- Time zone: UTC+7 (ICT)
- Postal code: 11150
- TIS 1099: 120501

Sai Noi (Thai: ไทรน้อย, pronounced [sāj nɔ́ːj]) is one of the seven subdistricts (tambon) of Sai Noi District, in Nonthaburi Province, Thailand. Neighbouring subdistricts are (clockwise from north) Khlong Khwang, Lahan, Bang Bua Thong, Thawi Watthana and Khun Si. In 2020 it had a total population of 29,256 people.

== Administration ==
=== Central administration ===
The subdistrict is subdivided into 11 administrative villages (muban).

No.	Name	Thai
1.	Ban Sai Noi	บ้านไทรน้อย
2.	Ban Khlong Ta Khlai	บ้านคลองตาคล้าย
3.	Ban Sai Noi	บ้านไทรน้อย
4.	Ban Sai Noi	บ้านไทรน้อย
5.	Ban Sai Noi (Ban Khlong Phra Phimon)	บ้านไทรน้อย (บ้านคลองพระพิมล)
6.	Ban Khlong Ha Roi	บ้านคลองห้าร้อย
7.	Ban Khlong Farang	บ้านคลองฝรั่ง
8.	Ban Khlong Ta Khlai	บ้านคลองตาคล้าย
9.	Ban Sai Noi	บ้านไทรน้อย
10.	Ban Sai Noi	บ้านไทรน้อย
11.	Ban Sai Noi	บ้านไทรน้อย

=== Local administration ===
The area of the subdistrict is shared by two local administrative organizations.

- Sai Noi Subdistrict Municipality (เทศบาลตำบลไทรน้อย)
- Sai Noi Subdistrict Administrative Organization (องค์การบริหารส่วนตำบลไทรน้อย)
