= Bang Bua Thong =

City of Bang Bua Thong

Bang Bua Thong บางบัวทอง
- City Municipality
- City of Bang Bua Thong เทศบาลนครบางบัวทอง
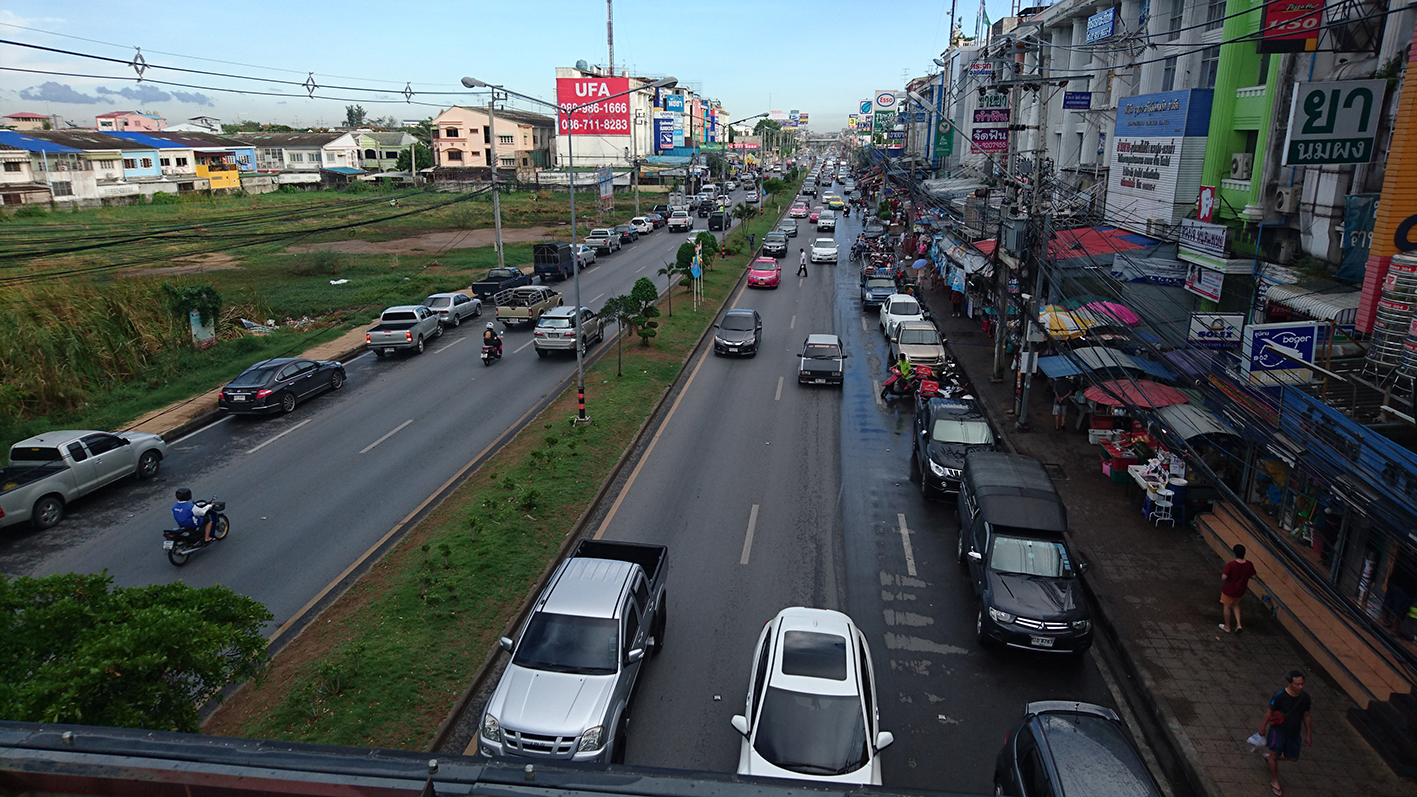
- A road in Bang Bua Thong

- Seal

- Location in Thailand
- Coordinates: 13°55′N 100°24′E
- Country: Thailand
- Province: Nonthaburi
- District: Bang Bua Thong district

Government
  - Type: City Municipality
  - Mayor: TBD
- Time zone: UTC+7 (ICT)
- Calling Code: 02
- Website: www.buathongcity.go.th

Bang Bua Thong (Thai: บางบัวทอง, pronounced [bāːŋ būa̯ tʰɔ̄ːŋ]) is a city in Thailand's Bangkok Metropolitan Region.
