= Bang Len district =

Bang Len บางเลน
- District
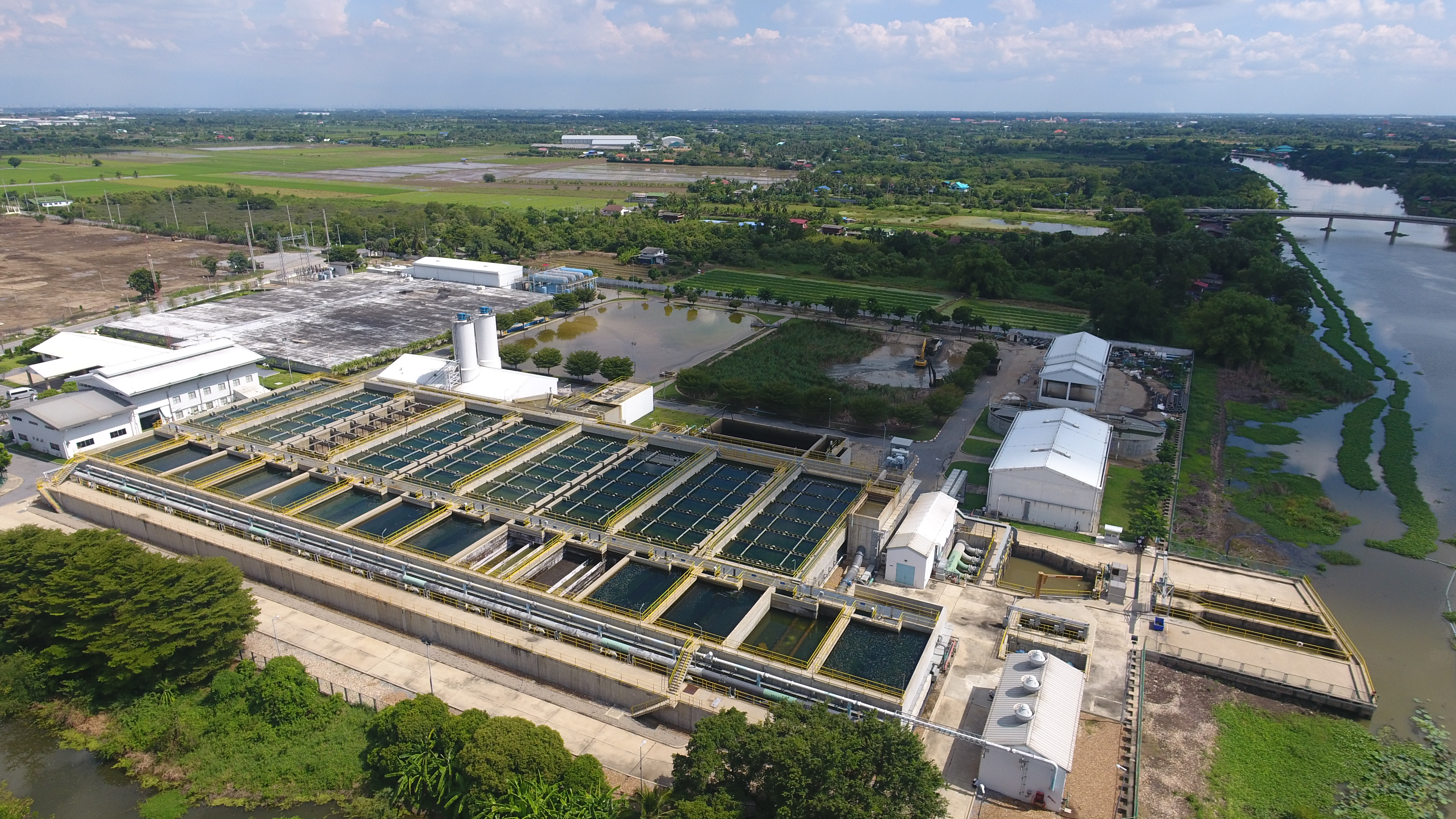
- Tap water factory Bang Len

- District location in Nakhon Pathom province
- Coordinates: 14°1′18″N 100°9′56″E
- Country: Thailand
- Province: Nakhon Pathom
- Seat: Bang Len

Area
  - Total: 588.836 km^{2} (227.351 sq mi)

Population (2017)
  - Total: 93,424
  - Density: 158.65/km^{2} (410.9/sq mi)
- Time zone: UTC+7 (ICT)
- Postal code: 73130
- Geocode: 7305

Bang Len (Thai: บางเลน, pronounced [bāːŋ lēːn]) is a district (amphoe) in the northern part of Nakhon Pathom province, central Thailand.

== History ==
The district was created in 1896 under the name Bang Phai Nat (บางไผ่นารถ). The district office was in Ban Bang Phai Nat, Tambon Bang Sai Pa, on the east bank of the Tha Chin River. Later the government moved the central district to Tambon Bang Pla on the west bank of the Tha Chin. At the same time the district name was changed accordingly to Bang Pla. In 1939 the district was again renamed and received its current name Bang Len. The district office was moved to Tambon Bang Len in 1978.

The term Bang Len refers to 'place of mire', named after Khlong Bang Len, a tributary of Tha Chin river.

== Geography ==
Neighbouring districts are (from the north clockwise): Song Phi Nong of Suphanburi province; Lat Bua Luang of Ayutthaya province; Sai Noi of Nonthaburi province; and Phutthamonthon, Nakhon Chai Si, Don Tum, and Kamphaeng Saen of Nakhon Pathom Province.

== Economy ==
Wat Lampaya floating market (ตลาดน้ำวัดลำพญา) on the Tha Chin river is a well-known floating market as is Don Wai in Sam Phran.

The occupation of most Bang Len people is farmers. Bang Len also has a number of shrimp farms, both giant river prawn and whiteleg shrimp. Besides being a centre of production, the district is also one of the largest shrimp trading centres in the country as well.

In mid-2019, the Department of Airports (DOA) proposed the construction of a new airport in Nakhon Pathom province, 50 kilometres west of Bangkok, to relieve pressure on Bangkok's two existing airports. The 20 billion baht airport would occupy 3,500 rai of land in Bang Len as well as Nakhon Chai Si District. Its capacity would be 25 million passengers annually. If approved, construction would start in 2023 and the airport would be operational by 2025 or 2026.

== Administration ==
The district is divided into 15 subdistricts (tambons), which are further subdivided into 180 villages (mubans). There are four townships (thesaban tambons): Bang Len, Bang Luang, Rang Krathum, and Lam Phaya. There are 15 tambon administrative organizations, one for each tambon.

No.	Name	Thai name	Villages
1.	Bang Len	บางเลน	12
2.	Bang Pla	บางปลา	13
3.	Bang Luang	บางหลวง	21
4.	Bang Phasi	บางภาษี	13
5.	Bang Rakam	บางระกำ	15
6.	Bang Sai Pa	บางไทรป่า	10
7.	Hin Mun	หินมูล	11
8.	Sai Ngam	ไทรงาม	11
9.	Don Tum	ดอนตูม	9
10.	Ninlaphet	นิลเพชร	10
11.	Bua Pak Tha	บัวปากท่า	10
12.	Khlong Nok Krathung	คลองนกกระทุง	11
13.	Naraphirom	นราภิรมย์	9
14.	Lam Phaya	ลำพญา	11
15.	Phai Hu Chang	ไผ่หูช้าง	7
