= Mueang Nakhon Pathom district =

Mueang Nakhon Pathom เมืองนครปฐม
- District
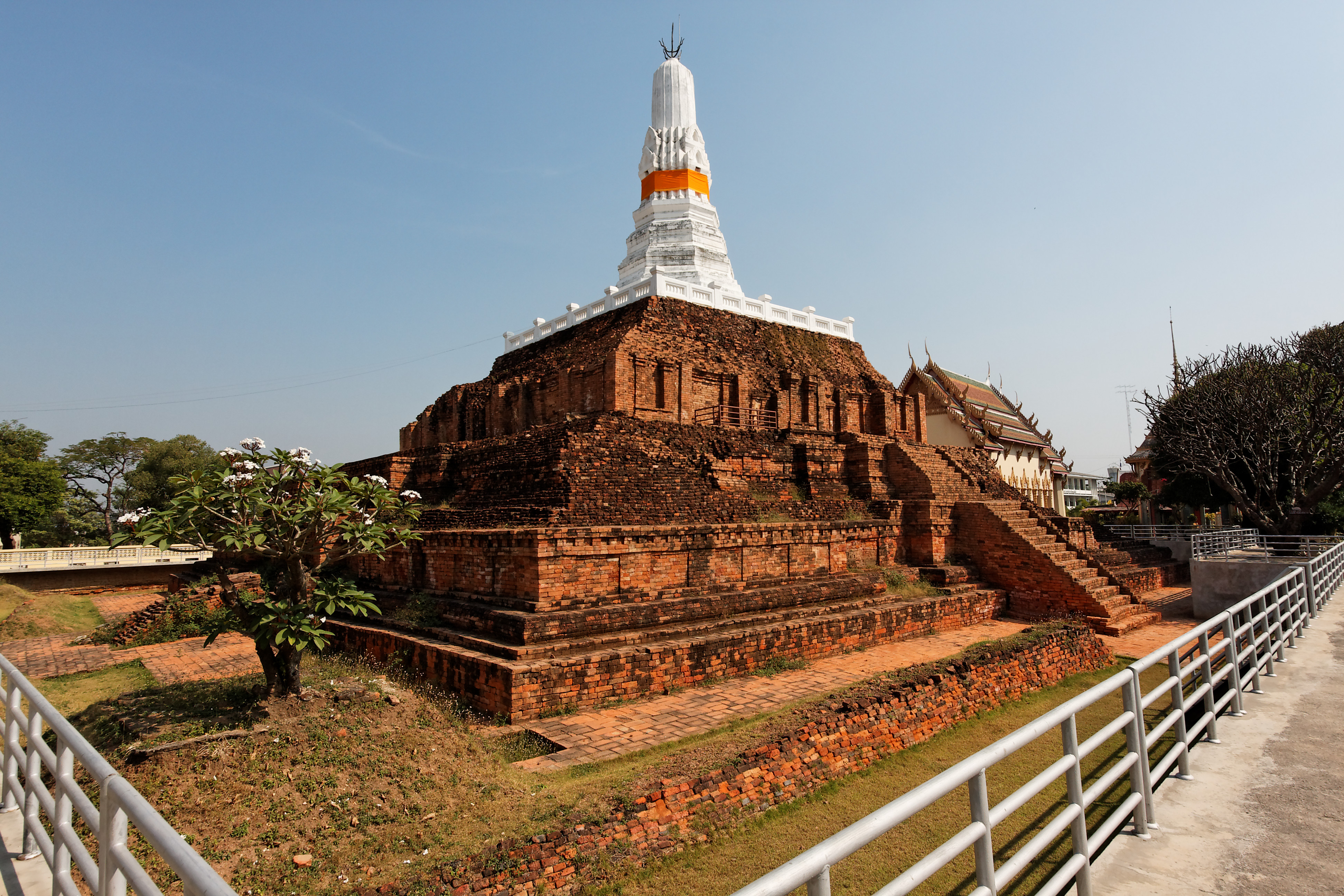
- Phra Prathon Chedi a prominent and ancient stūpa of the district, apart from nearby Phra Pathom Chedi

- District location in Nakhon Pathom province
- Coordinates: 13°49′11″N 100°3′57″E
- Country: Thailand
- Province: Nakhon Pathom
- Seat: Phra Pathom Chedi

Area
  - Total: 417.44 km^{2} (161.17 sq mi)

Population (2017)
  - Total: 279,944
  - Density: 670.62/km^{2} (1,736.9/sq mi)
- Time zone: UTC+7 (ICT)
- Postal code: 73000
- Geocode: 7301

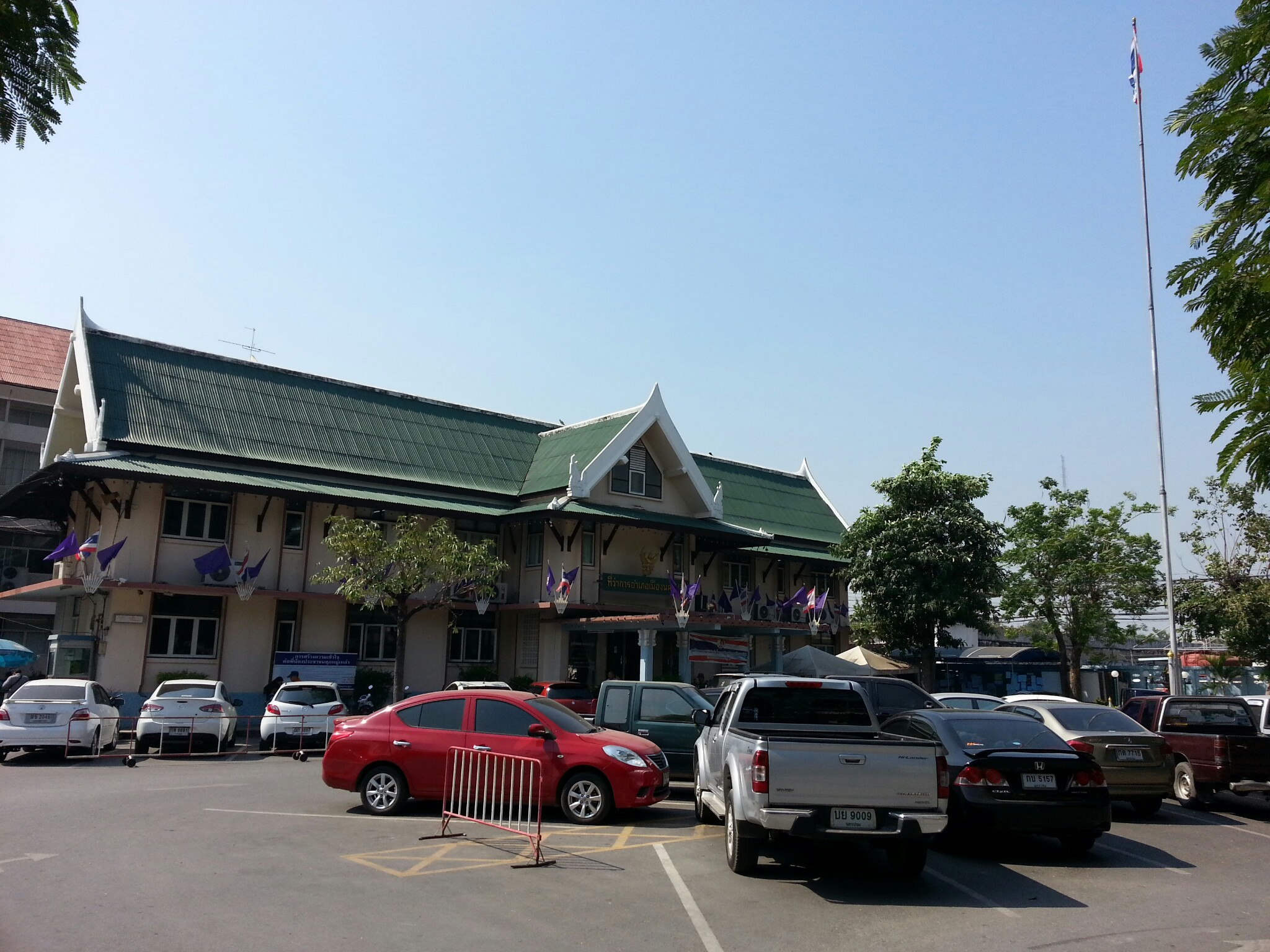
Muang Nakhon Pathom District Office at tambon Phra Pathom Chedi

Mueang Nakhon Pathom (Thai: เมืองนครปฐม, pronounced [mɯ̄a̯ŋ ná(ʔ).kʰɔ̄ːn pā.tʰǒm]) is the capital district (Amphoe Mueang) of Nakhon Pathom province, central Thailand.

== History ==
The district was created in 1895 named Phra Pathom Chedi District, under control of Mueang Nakhon Chai Si, Monthon Nakhon Chai Si. In 1898 the government moved the capital city of the monthon and the province from Nakhon Chai Si to Phra Pathom Chedi District. King Vajiravudh (Rama VI) changed the district name to Mueang Nakhon Pathom in 1913.

== Geography ==
Neighboring districts are (from the north clockwise): Kamphaeng Saen, Don Tum, Nakhon Chai Si, Sam Phran of Nakhon Pathom province; Bang Phae, Photharam and Ban Pong of Ratchaburi province.

Khlong Chedi Bucha is the important water resource of the district.

== Administration ==
The district is divided into 25 subdistricts (tambons), which are further subdivided into 217 villages (mubans). The city (thesaban nakhon) of Nakhon Pathom covers tambon Phra Pathom Chedi and parts of tambons Bang Khaem, Bang Khaem, Sanam Chan, Bo Phlap, Nakhon Pathom, Nong Pak Long, Lam Phaya, and Huai Chorakhe. There are a further three townships (thesaban tambons): Phrong Maduea covers parts of tambons Phrong Maduea and Nong Din Daeng, Tham Sala covers parts of tambon Tham Sala, and Don Yai Hom covers parts of tambon Don Yai Hom.

1.	Phra Pathom Chedi	พระปฐมเจดีย์
2.	Bang Khaem	บางแขม
3.	Phra Prathon	พระประโทน
4.	Thammasala	ธรรมศาลา
5.	Ta Kong	ตาก้อง
6.	Map Khae	มาบแค
7.	Sanam Chan	สนามจันทร์
8.	Don Yai Hom	ดอนยายหอม
9.	Thanon Khat	ถนนขาด
10.	Bo Phlap	บ่อพลับ
11.	Nakhon Pathom	นครปฐม
12.	Wang Taku	วังตะกู
13.	Nong Pak Long	หนองปากโลง
14.	Sam Khwai Phueak	สามควายเผือก
15.	Thung Noi	ทุ่งน้อย
16.	Nong Din Daeng	หนองดินแดง
17.	Wang Yen	วังเย็น
18.	Phrong Maduea	โพรงมะเดื่อ
19.	Lam Phaya	ลำพยา
20.	Sa Kathiam	สระกะเทียม
21.	Suan Pan	สวนป่าน
22.	Huai Chorakhe	ห้วยจรเข้
23.	Thap Luang	ทัพหลวง
24.	Nong Ngu Lueam	หนองงูเหลือม
25.	Ban Yang	บ้านยาง
