= Nakhon Chai Si district =

Nakhon Chai Si นครชัยศรี
- District
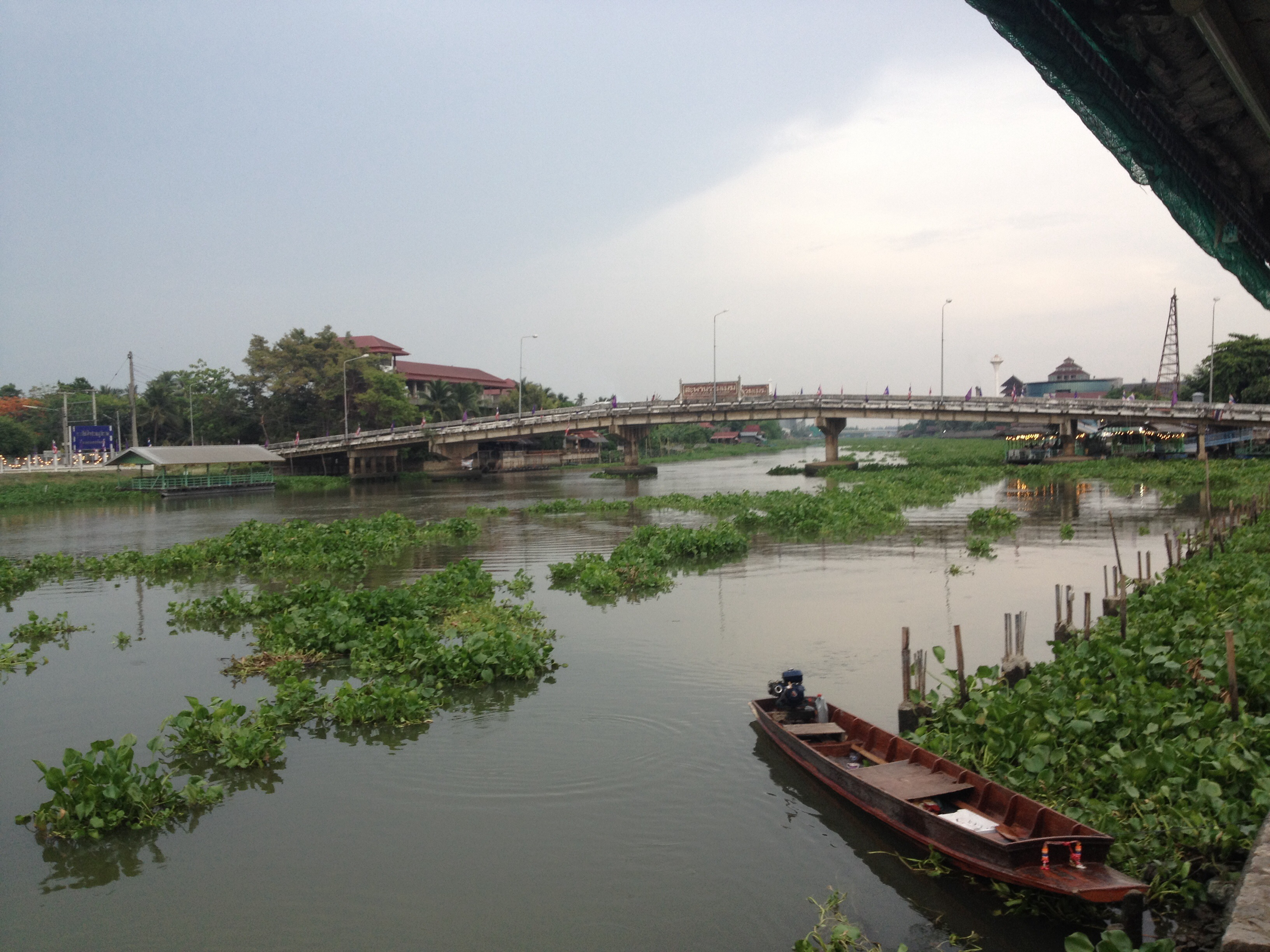
- The Tha Chin River flows through Nakhon Chai Si Sub-district, where it is called the "Nakhon Chai Si River"

- District location in Nakhon Pathom province

- Location in Thailand
- Coordinates: 13°48′4″N 100°11′16″E
- Country: Thailand
- Province: Nakhon Pathom
- Seat: Nakhon Chai Si

Area
  - Total: 284.031 km^{2} (109.665 sq mi)

Population (2017)
  - Total: 111,119
  - Density: 391.22/km^{2} (1,013.3/sq mi)
- Time zone: UTC+7 (ICT)
- Postal code: 73120
- Geocode: 7303

Nakhon Chai Si (Thai: นครชัยศรี, pronounced [ná(ʔ).kʰɔ̄ːn t͡ɕʰāj sǐː]) is a district (amphoe) of Nakhon Pathom province, central Thailand.

== History ==
David K. Wyatt named Nakhon Chai Si as one of three places, with Ratchaburi and Suphan Buri, in which the polity Chinese records of about 1200 call Chen Li Fu might be sought. He argued from O. W. Wolters's finding that the polity held both a port and an inland capital, from the reconstruction of the ancient shoreline by Phōngsi Wanasin and Thiwa Supcanya, and from Wolters's own note that early Chinese navigators rarely called on the eastern coast of the Bay of Bangkok; other scholars place the polity at Sankhaburi in Chai Nat province instead. Wyatt also records that Nakhon Chai Si stands considerably higher than the ground to its east.

Nakhon Chai Si was originally established during the reign of King Maha Chakkraphat of the Ayutthaya kingdom. When King Chulalongkorn introduced the Monthon system as part of the Thesaphiban administrative reform, Mueang Nakhon Chai Si became the capital city of Monthon Nakhon Chai Si. Later, after the system was abolished, Mueang Nakhon Chai Si was downgraded to a district under Nakhon Pathom province.

The name Nakhon Chai Si was given in remembrance of King Chaiyasiri of the Singhanavati Kingdom, who was the son of King Phrom and believed by the people of Ayutthaya to be their ancestor.

More than a thousand years ago, Han Chinese referred to Nakhon Chai Si, along with nearby areas such as Samut Sakhon, by the Teochew name "Leng Kia Chu" (Chinese: 龍仔厝; pinyin: Lóng zǐ cuò). This term means "home of the dragon's descendants" and may have been inspired by the way the Tha Chin River winds through the region in curves that resemble a serpent or dragon.

== Geography ==
Neighboring districts are (from the north clockwise): Bang Len, Phutthamonthon, Sam Phran, Mueang Nakhon Pathom, and Don Tum.

The main water resource is the Tha Chin River, which is named Nakhon Chai Si River in the area of and around the district.

== Economy ==
In mid-2019, the Department of Airports (DOA) proposed the construction of a new airport in Nakhon Pathom province, 50 kilometres west of Bangkok, to relieve pressure on Bangkok's two existing airports. The 20 billion baht airport would occupy 3,500 rai of land in Nakhon Chai Si District as well as Bang Len. Its capacity would be 25 million passengers annually. If approved, construction would start in 2023 and the airport would be operational by 2025 or 2026.

== Administration ==
The district is divided into 24 sub-districts (tambons), which are further subdivided into 108 villages (mubans). Both Nakhon Chai Si and Huai Phlu have sub-district municipality (thesaban tambon) status. Each of the tambons has a tambon administrative organization (TAO).

No.	Name	Thai	Villages	Pop.
1.	Nakhon Chai Si	นครชัยศรี	3	2,957
2.	Bang Krabao	บางกระเบา	3	1,032
3.	Wat Khae	วัดแค	4	2,010
4.	Tha Tamnak	ท่าตำหนัก	4	6,521
5.	Bang Kaeo	บางแก้ว	4	3,339
6.	Tha Krachap	ท่ากระชับ	4	3,960
7.	Khun Kaeo	ขุนแก้ว	4	7,734
8.	Tha Phraya	ท่าพระยา	5	3,674
9.	Phaniat	พะเนียด	4	3,858
10.	Bang Rakam	บางระกำ	4	4,886
11.	Khok Phra Chedi	โคกพระเจดีย์	5	4,746
12.	Sisa Thong	ศรีษะทอง	5	7,291
13.	Laem Bua	แหลมบัว	8	7,151
14.	Si Maha Pho	ศรีมหาโพธิ์	5	4,096
15.	Sam Pa Thuan	สัมปทวน	6	3,824
16.	Wat Samrong	วัดสำโรง	4	1,883
17.	Don Faek	ดอนแฝก	4	3,017
18.	Huai Phlu	ห้วยพลู	4	2,473
19.	Wat Lamut	วัดละมุด	5	5,562
20.	Bang Phra	บางพระ	4	2,750
21.	Bang Kaeo Fa	บางแก้วฟ้า	5	3,134
22.	Lan Tak Fa	ลานตากฟ้า	5	7,858
23.	Ngio Rai	งิ้วราย	4	2,925
24.	Thaiyawat	ไทยาวาส	4	2,930
