= Nakhon Pathom province =

Province of Thailand

Coordinates: 13°55′N 100°7′E

Nakhon Pathom จังหวัดนครปฐม
- Province

Other transcription(s)
  - Chinese: 佛統 / 佛统 hug8 tong2 (Teochew Peng'im) pu̍t thóng (Hokkien POJ)
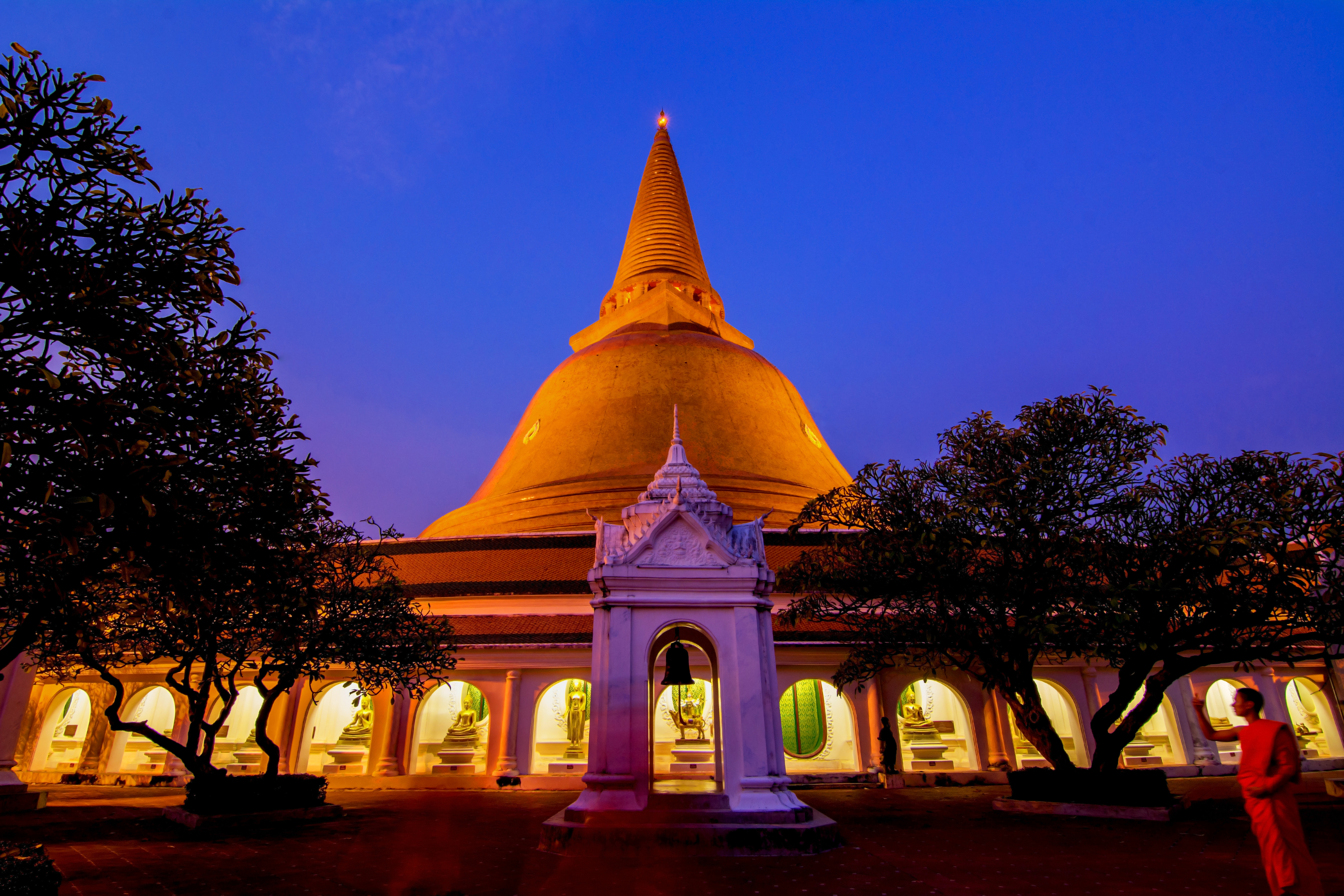
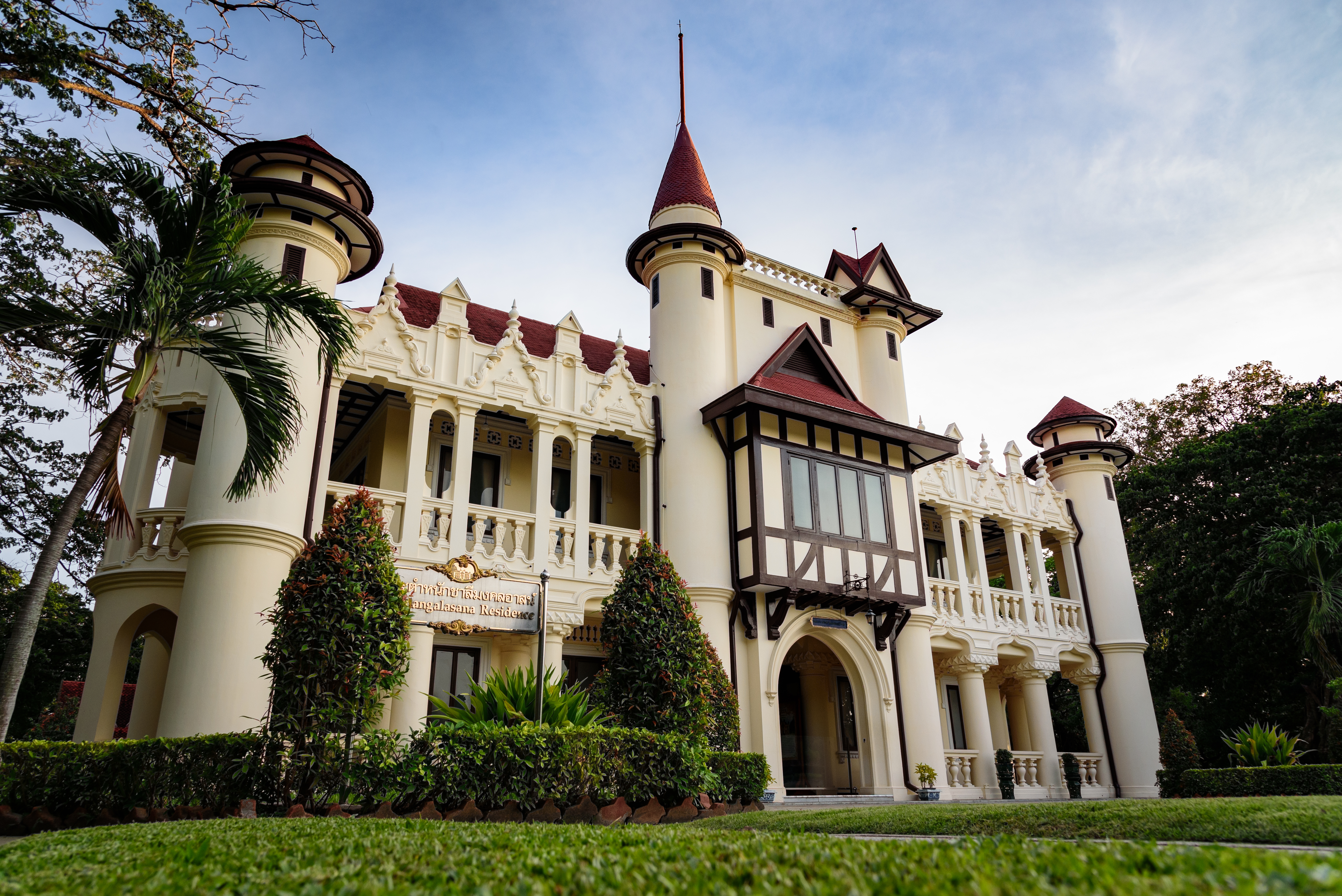
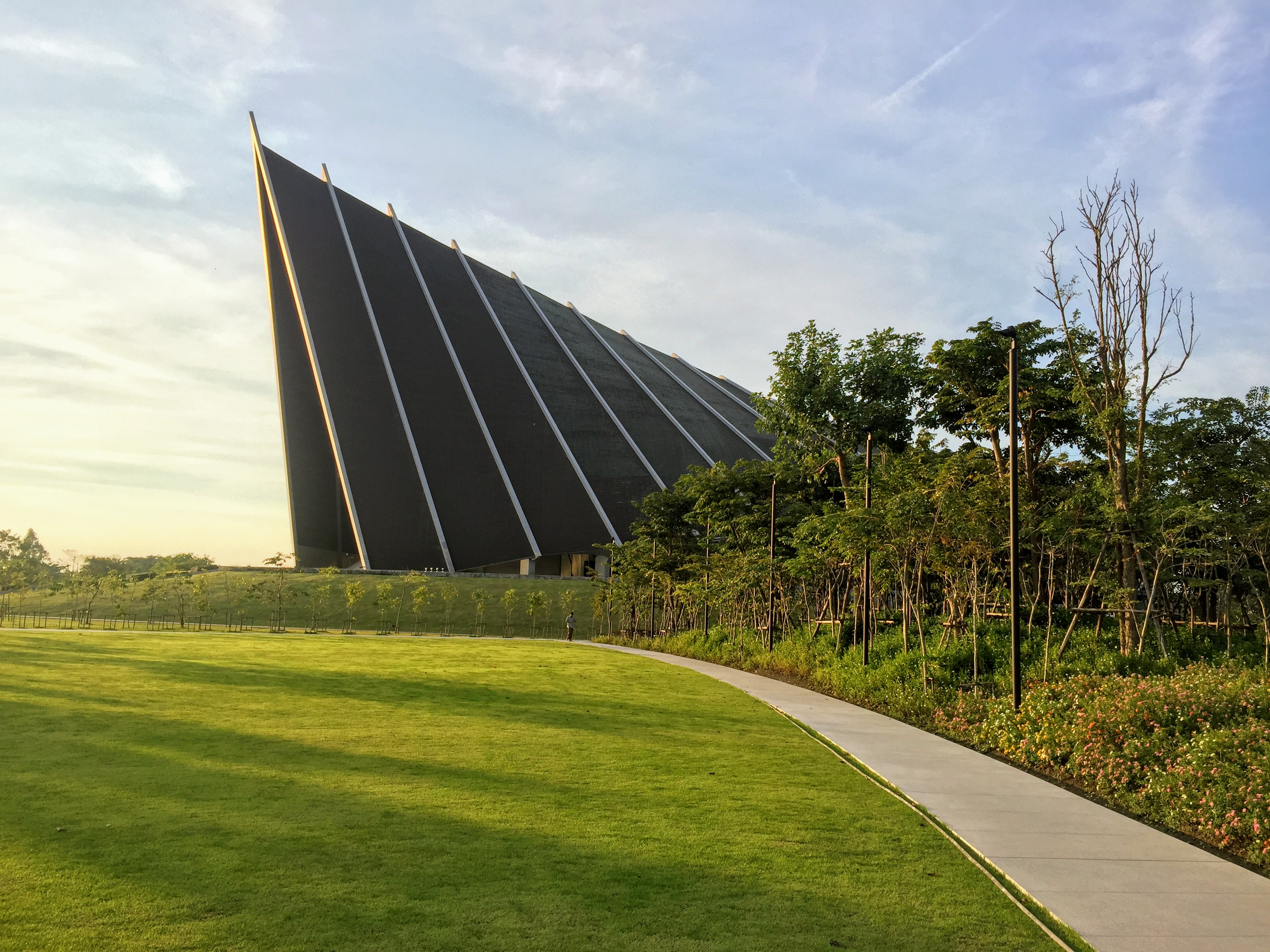
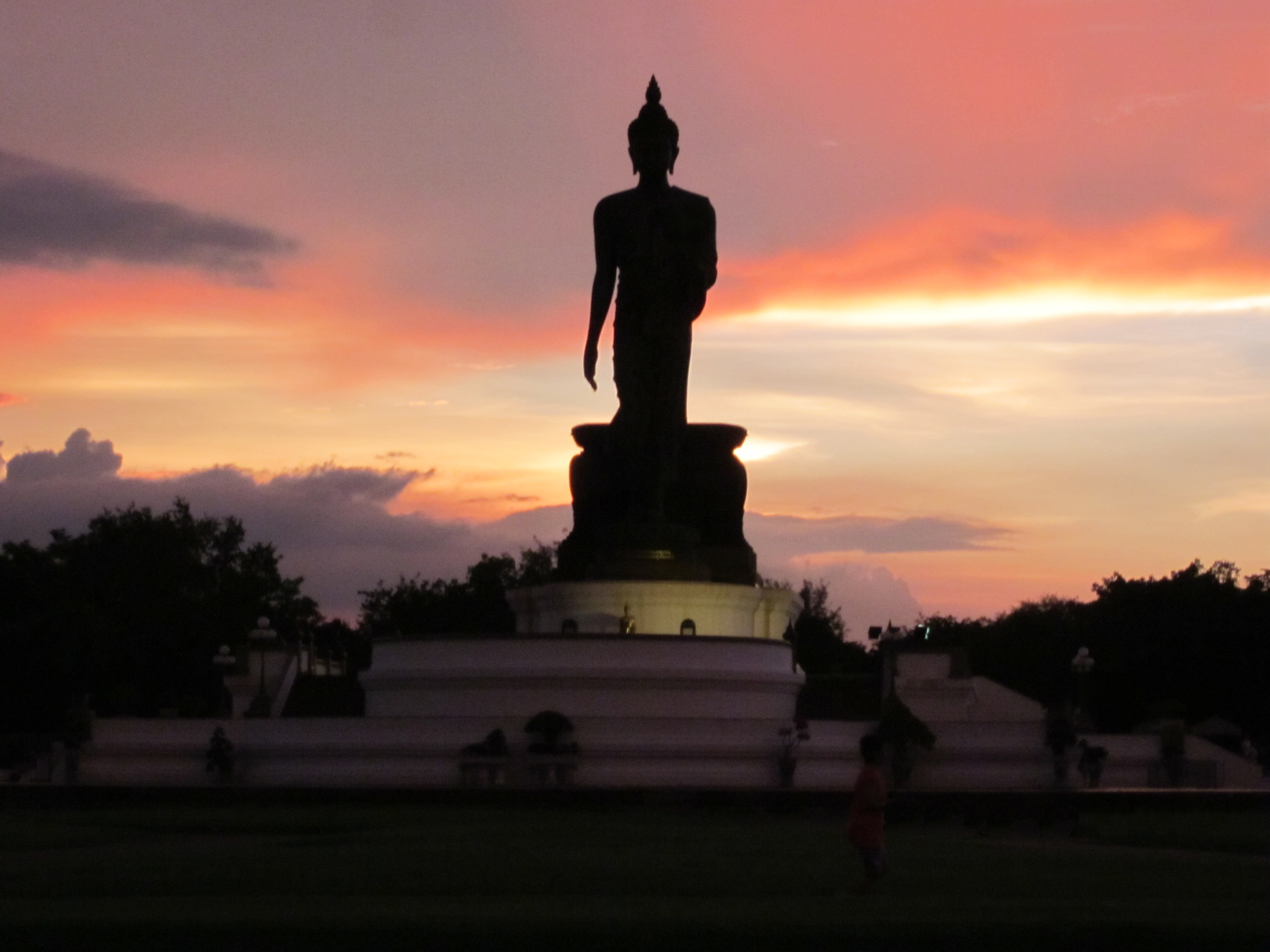
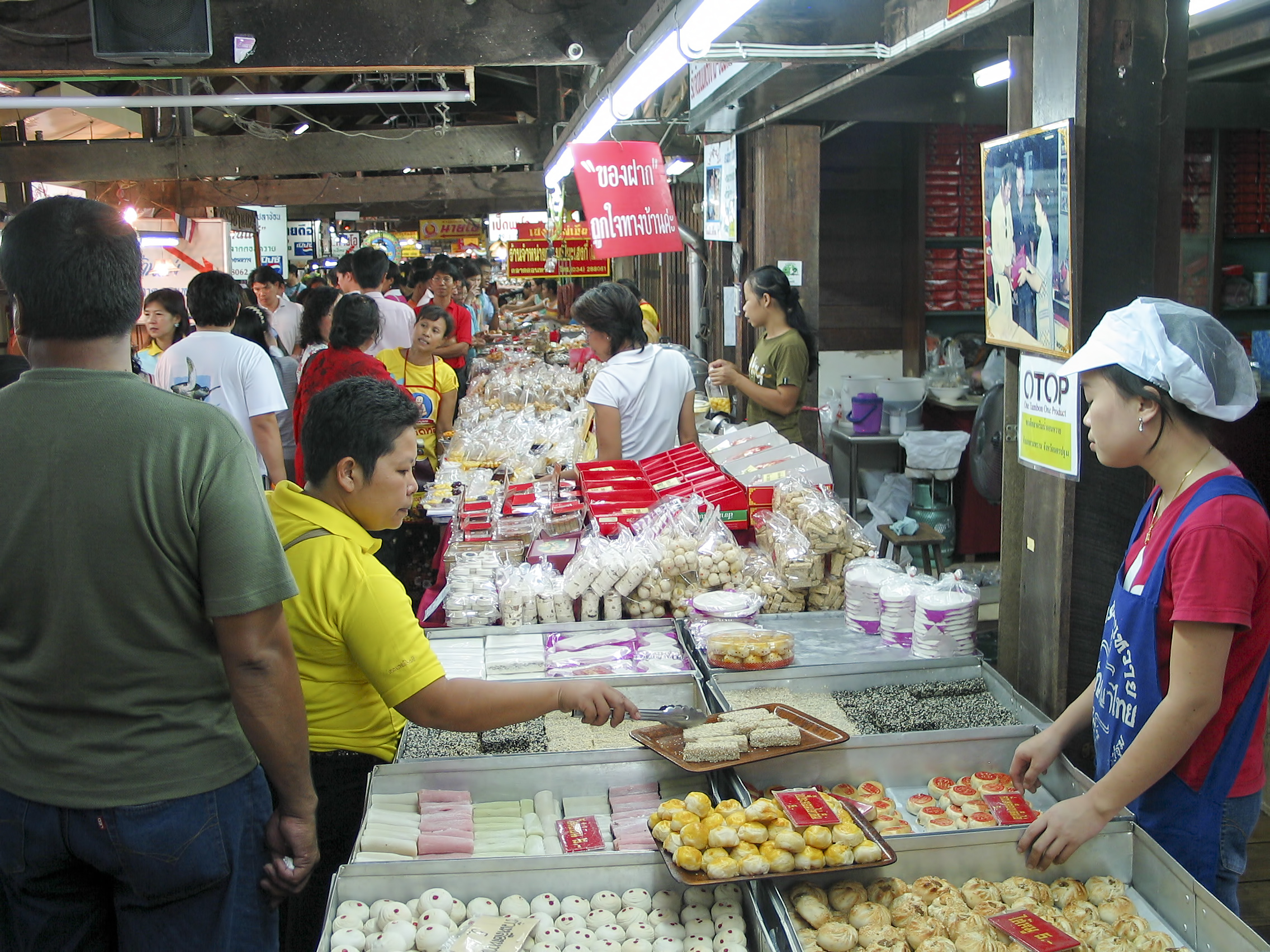
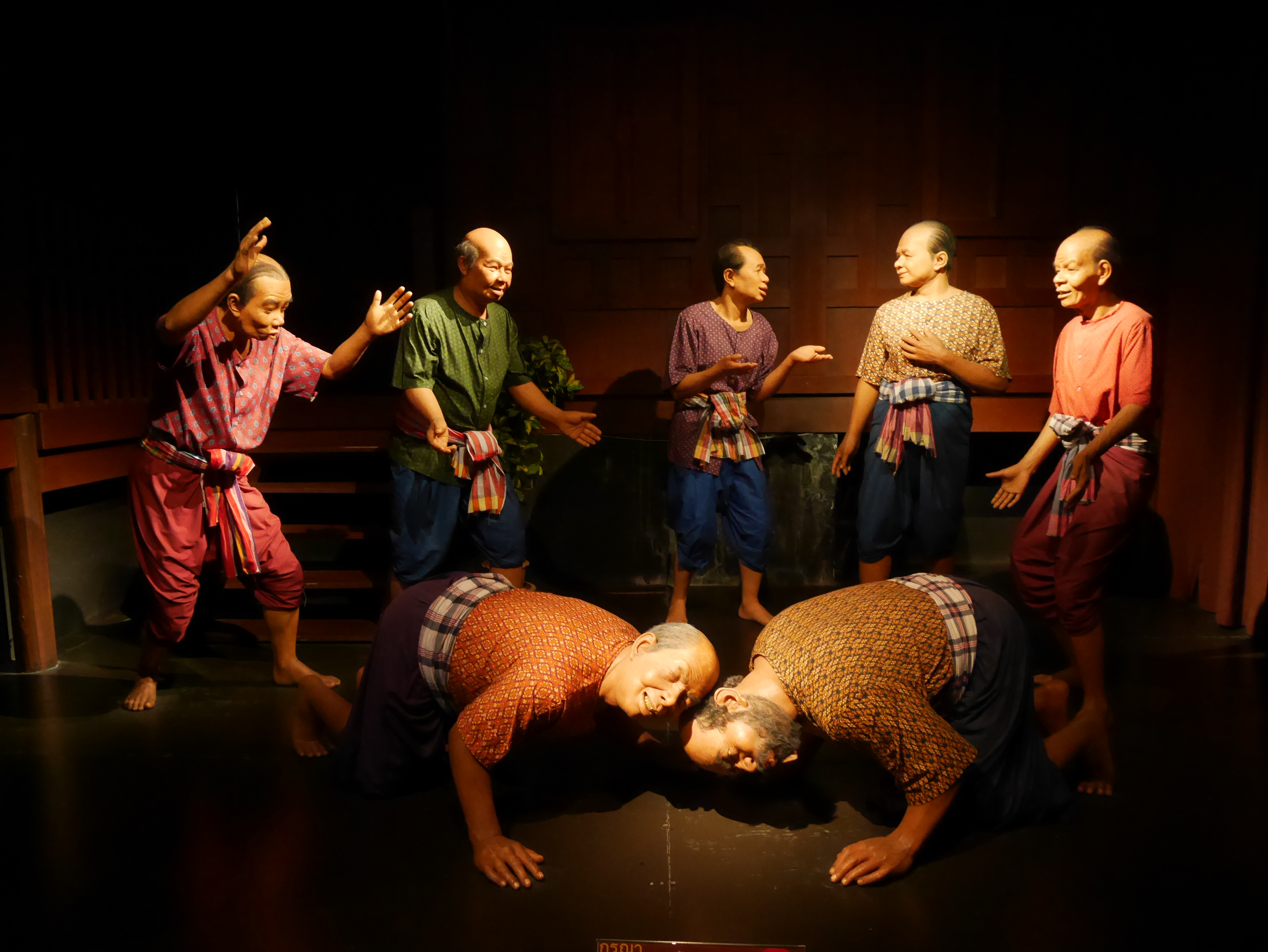
- (Clockwise from top left) Phra Pathommachedi, Sanam Chandra Palace, Prince Mahidol Hall of Mahidol University, Salaya Campus, Phutthamonthon Buddhism Park, Don Wai Market, Thai Human Imagery Museum

- Flag Seal
- Nickname: Mueang Chedi Yai (เมืองเจดีย์ใหญ่) (Big Cetiya City)
- Mottoes: ส้มโอหวาน ข้าวสารขาว ลูกสาวงาม ข้าวหลามหวานมัน สนามจันทร์งามล้น พุทธมณฑลคู่ธานี พระปฐมเจดีย์เสียดฟ้า สวยงามตาแม่น้ำท่าจีน ("Sweet pomelos. White rice. Beautiful women. Sweet and rich Khao Lam. Stunning Sanam Chan (Palace). Home of Phutthamonthon. Sky-high Phra Pathommachedi. Attractive Tha Chin River.")
- Map of Thailand highlighting Nakhon Pathom province
- Country: Thailand
- Capital: Nakhon Pathom

Government
  - Type: Province and Provincial Administrative Organization
  - Body: Nakhon Pathom Province and Nakhon Pathom Provincial Administrative Organization
  - Governor: Arocha Nanthamontri
  - PAO Chief Executive: Jirawat Sasomsap

Area
  - Total: 2,142 km^{2} (827 sq mi)
  - Rank: 66th

Population (2024)
  - Total: ▼925,758
  - Rank: 25th
  - Density: 432/km^{2} (1,120/sq mi)
  - Rank: 8th

Human Achievement Index
  - HAI (2022): 0.6698 "high" Ranked 6th

GDP
  - Total: baht 333 billion (US$11.3 billion) (2019)
- Time zone: UTC+7 (ICT)
- Postal code: 73xxx
- Calling code: 034 & 02
- ISO 3166 code: TH-73
- Website: nakhonpathom.go.th nkppao.go.th

Nakhon Pathom (Thai: จังหวัดนครปฐม, pronounced [náʔkʰɔ̄ːn pā.tʰǒm], (Pronunciation)) is one of the central provinces (changwat) of Thailand. Neighbouring provinces are (from north clockwise) Suphan Buri, Ayutthaya, Nonthaburi, Bangkok, Samut Sakhon, Ratchaburi, and Kanchanaburi. The capital city of Nakhon Pathom province is Nakhon Pathom.

Nakhon Pathom province is home to the Phra Pathommachedi, a chedi rebuilt on the orders of King Mongkut (Rama IV) and completed under King Chulalongkorn (Rama V) in 1870. The Dvaravati period is represented here by a large moated town and its monuments, and by tradition Nakhon Pathom is where Buddhism first reached Thailand. The province is known for its fruit orchards.

== History ==
=== Setting and early settlement ===
The town of Nakhon Pathom is often described as having stood on the coast, on the route between China and India, the coastline having since moved seaward through sedimentation from the Chao Phraya River. The reconstruction is disputed. Phōngsi Wanasin and Thiwa Supcanya found the ancient towns of the plain in two rows above the 3.5-metre contour, which David K. Wyatt reads as the fringes of a plain then largely under water rather than as an open coast. Trongjai Hutangkura's reconsideration of the old shoreline finds that their survey overestimated the height of the mean sea level, and that what it mapped as coast was a floodplain.

Excavation at Hor-Ek, about 500 m northwest of the Phra Pathommachedi, found occupation from the 3rd to the 11th centuries. Its pottery resembles material from Chan Sen and includes a burnished ware close to Phimai Black, and a sherd painted with a sun pattern like one from Phum Snay in Cambodia dated to the 5th century. The excavators divide the sequence into three phases and propose pre- or proto-Dvaravati for the first, of the 3rd to 6th centuries. Saritpong Khunsong, Phasook Indrawooth and S. Natapintu published the excavation in 2011. Earlier work in Phra Prathon subdistrict by Phasook Indrawooth produced a single inconclusive radiocarbon date, and she placed the material in the 8th and 9th centuries on the pottery and on art-historical comparison.

=== Dvaravati period ===
The ancient town measured about 3,700 by 2,000 m, some 740 ha, although Karen Mudar's measurement of the moated area gives 602 ha. It stood on the west bank of the Tha Chin, about 60 km west of present-day Bangkok. Two large stupas stood at its centre, Chula Pathon Chedi, excavated by Pierre Dupont, and Phra Pathon Chedi, with Wat Phra Men about 1 km outside the moat to the southwest. Supitchar Jindawattanaphum describes five stucco figures from Chula Pathon Chedi, seated with the knees raised, bare above the waist and each clasping a sword. She reads them as warriors and reports them in the Phra Pathommachedi National Museum.

In his Tamnan Phutthachedi Damrong Rajanubhab held that Dvaravati stupas stand at Nakhon Pathom in greater numbers than anywhere else, that they are the oldest in Siam, and that their form came from Magadha. He inferred from this that Buddhism reached Siam before about 43 BCE, and that the earliest images made there, among them the Buddha seated with the legs pendent, follow Magadhan models of the Gupta period.

Tang ceramics, glass beads of the lead composition treated as diagnostic of Chinese production, and stucco and terracotta figures identified as foreign merchants have all been recorded from the ancient town.

The moated site of Kamphaeng Saen lies roughly midway between Nakhon Pathom and U Thong and may have been a satellite of both. Radiocarbon dates from Matthew Gallon's excavations put its first occupation in the early 5th century, its most intensive phase from the 5th or 6th to the mid-7th, and its abandonment by the 9th. Its 5th- and 6th-century layers hold Dvaravati pottery, saddle querns and beads but lack stamped earthenware and blue-green glazed Persian ware, and substantial Buddhist building appears only in the 7th and 8th centuries.

The Wat Pho Rang fragment from the province carries an Old Mon inscription of the sixth century, which Mathias Jenny calls the oldest Mon inscription so far found. He takes the word brāw 'coconut' in it for the source of Thai máʔ-phráaw. Inscribed silver medallions reading śrī-dvāravatī-īśvara-puṇya have been recorded from this province and from Ratchaburi, Suphan Buri, Sing Buri, Lop Buri and Chai Nat. Most are chance finds whose exact provenance is unknown, many are in private collections, and forgeries have lately been noticed. Two of the earliest to be published were found in 1943 at Nern Hin, near the Phra Pathommachedi, and were reported by Jan Boeles; Cœdès translated their legend as the meritorious act of the king of Dvaravati. Supitchar, following Phasook Indrawooth, gives the find-spot as Nern Phra beside Wat Phra Prathon. The Wat Maheyong inscription (K. 407) is a Sanskrit text of about the seventh or eighth century. It is usually reported from Nakhon Si Thammarat, but Lucien Fournereau gave its provenance as a Wat Mahyeng that he placed in this province.

The wheel of the law from the Phra Pathommachedi is now in the Bangkok National Museum. It carries an abridged form of the passage on the four realities in three phases and twelve aspects, with a verse on the knowledge of those realities in its inner hub. Its spellings pahātavvaṃ, sacch(i)kātavvaṃ and bhāvetavvaṃ show the doubled v characteristic of early Pali inscriptions in the region. On its fourteenth spoke Eng Jin Ooi and Peter Skilling read -ṭṭhena where George Cœdès read -bhāvena and both editions of the Fine Arts Department's Inscriptions in Thailand read eta. A stone deer accompanies the wheel.

A square socle from Kamphaeng Saen, in the Nakhon Pathom National Museum, carries the same verse in full. Cœdès noted that it recurs in the later Paṭhamasambodhi and Sāratthasamuccaya; Ooi and Skilling add that it is not canonical and is known, so far as they are aware, only in Pali. A fragment of a stone throne from Wat Phra Men, in the Phra Pathommachedi National Museum, carries a relief the museum identifies as a vayalaka, a hybrid animal. Ooi and Skilling compare its raised forearm to that of the lions found with the wheel at Chai Nat.

A terracotta lion recovered from the excavation of Wat Phra Men has its mane worked in large curls. Pongsak Nillavorn finds the same treatment on a seated lion at the base of a Pallava pillar at Tiruchirappalli, and on a lion from Prasat Tao at Sambor Prei Kuk. The jutting leaf, a rolled leaf laid in a continuous row, appears on a Buddha's throne back-rest from the province. It appears again on a stone wheel of the law in the Phra Pathommachedi National Museum, and on the base of another carved as the vimāna of the sun, now in the Bangkok National Museum.

Varis Domethong counts a stone elephant from Wat Phra Prathon, with another from Pong Tuek in Kanchanaburi, as the only material in the central plain that links the region to Champa in the ninth and tenth centuries. He holds the two too sparse to establish contact for that period, against the fuller evidence of the sixth to ninth.

=== Post-Dvaravati period ===
When the Tha Chin River changed its course, Nakhon Pathom lost its main water source and thus was for hundreds of years deserted, the population moving to a city called Nakhon Chai Si (or Sri Wichai).

=== Modern history ===
King Mongkut (Rama IV) ordered the restoration of the Phra Pathommachedi, which was then crumbling and abandoned in the jungle. A city gradually formed around it, bringing new life to Nakhon Pathom. A museum presents the archaeological record of the city's history.

Settlement of the province drew on immigration from the reign of King Buddha Loetla Nabhalai (Rama II). It brought Khmer villages such as Don Yai Hom, a Lan Na-settled village (Baan Nua) and Lao Song villages such as Don Kanak, and a large influx of southern Chinese in the late 1800s and early 1900s. Today Nakhon Pathom attracts people from all over Thailand, most notably from Bangkok and Isan, plus Burmese migrant workers. The province includes industrial zones, major university towns, government offices relocated from Bangkok, and agricultural and transport hubs.

== Geography ==
Nakhon Pathom is a small province 56 km from Bangkok. It is in the alluvial plain of central Thailand and is drained by the Tha Chin River (known locally as the Nakhon Chai Si), a tributary of the Chao Phraya River. There are many canals that have been dug for agriculture. The total forest area is just 1.6 km^{2} (0.62 sq mi) or 0.8 per mille of provincial area. The Thai capital Bangkok has grown until it borders Nakhon Pathom.

=== Climate ===
Nakhon Pathom province has a tropical savanna climate (Köppen climate classification category Aw). Winters are dry and warm. Temperatures rise until May. Monsoon season runs from May through October, with heavy rain and somewhat cooler temperatures during the day, although nights remain warm. Climatological data for the years 2012–2013: Its maximum temperature is 40.1 °C (104.2 °F) in April 2013 and the lowest temperature is 12.0 °C (53.6 °F) in December 2013. The highest average temperature is 37.4 °C (99.3 °F) in April 2013 and the minimum average temperature is 16.5 °C (61.7 °F) in December 2013. The average relative humidity is 75% and the minimum relative humidity is 22%. Annual rainfall is 1,095 millimetres. The number of rainy days was 134 days for the year 2013.

== Toponymy ==
The name derives from the Pali words Nagara Pathama, meaning 'first city', and Nakhon Pathom is often referred to as Thailand's oldest city. Archaeological remains have been linked to the (pre-Thai) Dvaravati period, dating to the 6th through 11th centuries.

== Economy ==
In mid-2019, the Department of Airports (DOA) proposed the construction of a new airport in the province, to relieve pressure on Bangkok's two existing airports. The 20 billion baht airport would occupy 3,500 rai of land in Bang Len District and Nakhon Chai Si District. Its capacity would be 25 million passengers annually. If approved, construction would start in 2023 and the airport would be operational by 2025 or 2026. When fully built-out, the airport will accommodate 80-100 seat aircraft flying between Bangkok and second-tier provinces to ease congestion at Suvarnabhumi and Don Mueang airports. The project site has low population density, only 200 households on 400 plots of land.

In terms of agriculture, Nakhon Pathom is a province that has long been known as a source of pig farming. Most of the original farmers were Thai-Chinese. Its amount of pig farming is ranked among the top in the country. The breeds of pigs that are popularly raised are exotic breeds, such as Landrace, Large White, Duroc, and various crossbreed varieties.

== Health ==
Nakhon Pathom's main hospital is Nakhon Pathom Hospital, operated by the Ministry of Public Health.

== Symbols ==
The provincial seal shows Phra Pathommachedi. It is in the centre of the city of Nakhon Pathom, and has been an important Buddhist centre since the 6th century. The current building was created by King Mongkut in 1860. On the pagoda a royal crown is depicted, the symbol for King Mongkut's work on reconstructing the pagoda.

The provincial flag is blue with the yellow provincial seal in the middle of the flag.

The provincial tree Diospyros decandra (known as "chan" in Thai). The provincial aquatic life is the giant river prawn (Macrobrachium rosenbergii) (known as "kung mae-nam" or "kung kam-kram" in Thai).

The provincial slogan is "sweet pomelos, delicious rice, beautiful young ladies".

== Administrative divisions ==
=== Provincial government ===
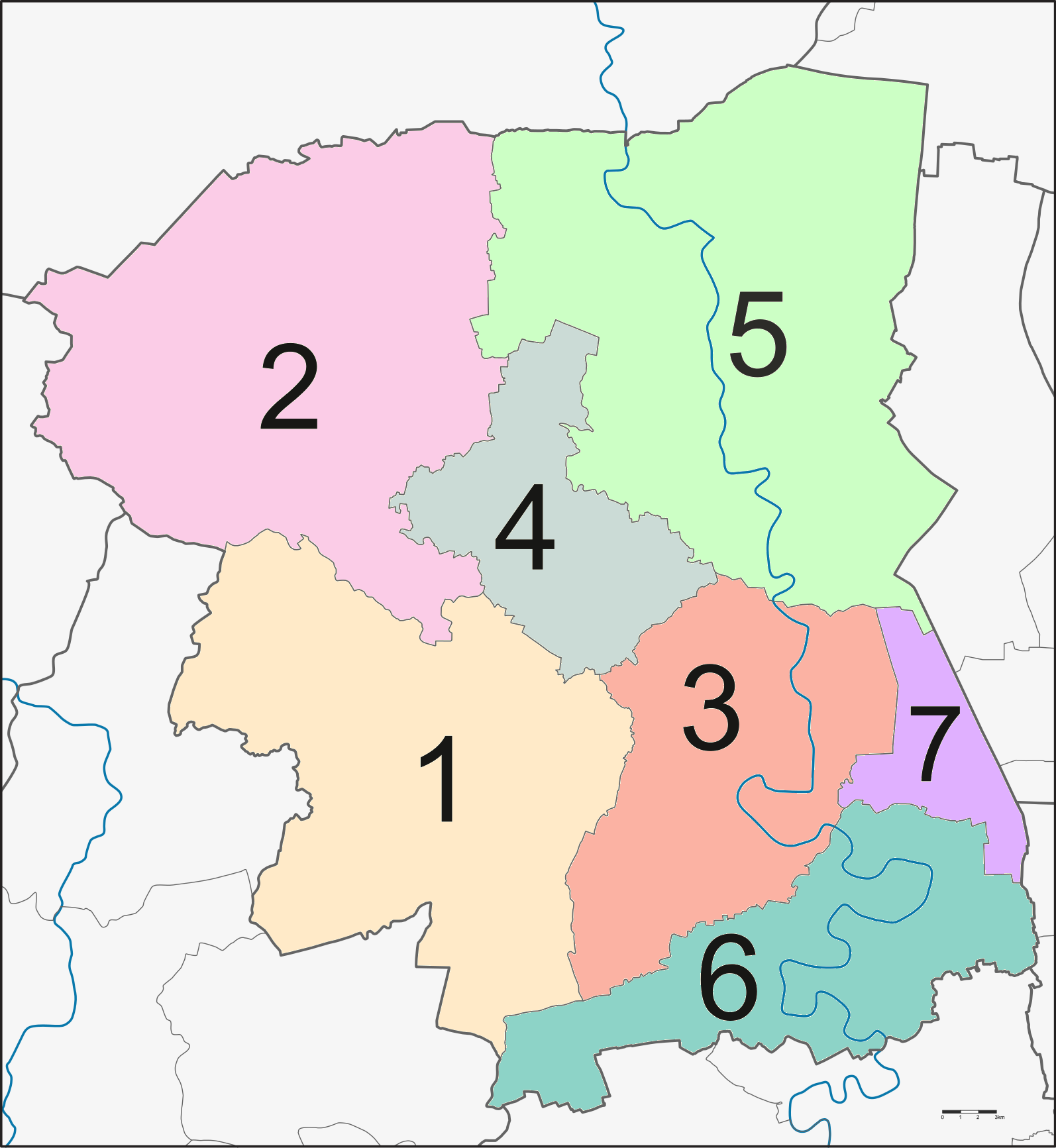
Map of Nakhon Pathom province with districts

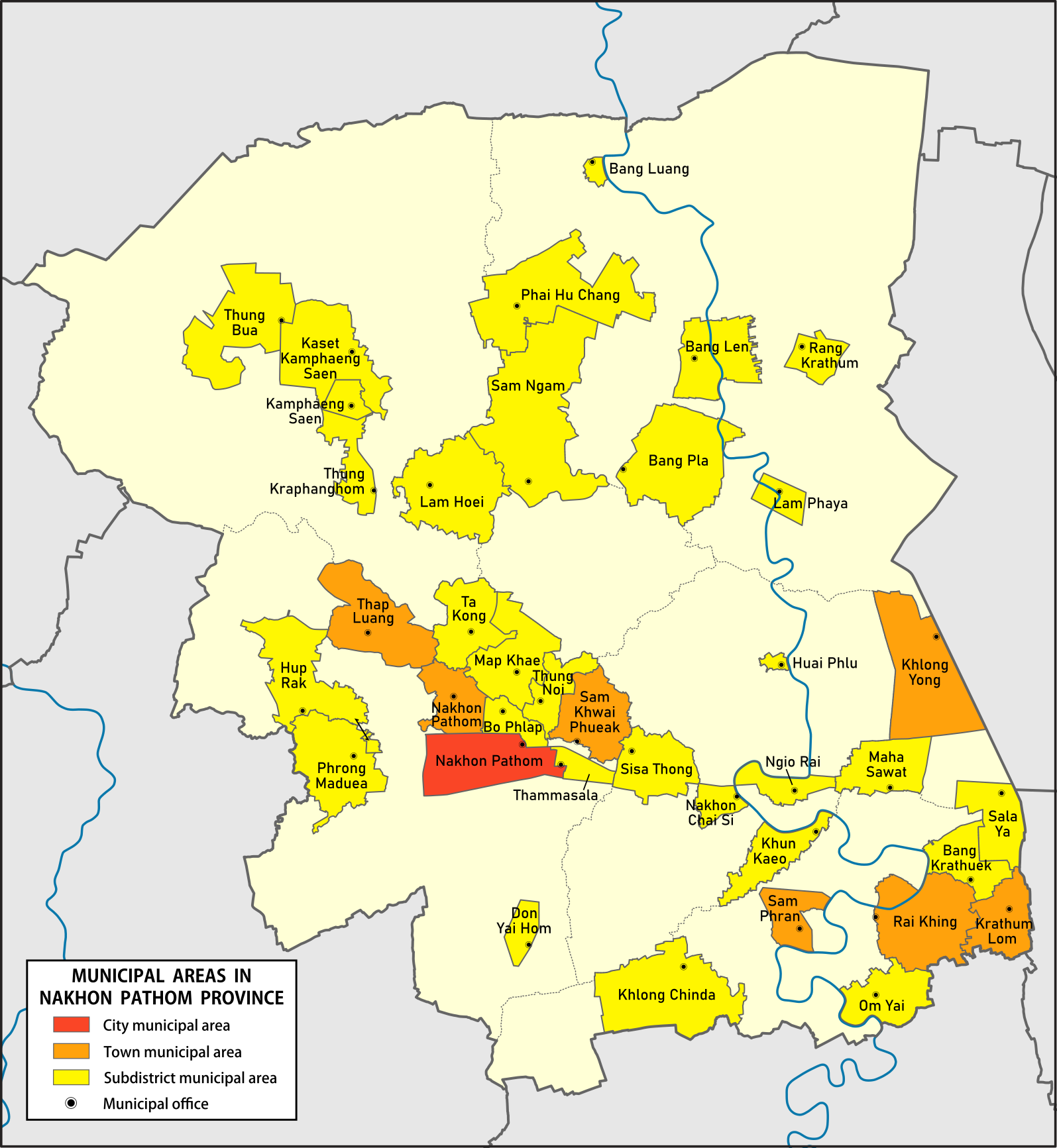
City municipalities (thesaban nakhon) Town municipalities (thesaban mueang) Subdistrict municipalities (thesaban tambon)

The province is divided into seven districts (amphoes). The districts are further subdivided into 106 subdistricts (tambons) and 904 villages (mubans).

1. Mueang Nakhon Pathom
2. Kamphaeng Saen
3. Nakhon Chai Si
4. Don Tum
5. Bang Len
6. Sam Phran
7. Phutthamonthon

=== Local government ===
As of 10 October 2020 there are: one Nakhon Pathom Provincial Administrative Organization - PAO (ongkan borihan suan changwat) and twenty-six municipal (thesaban) areas in the province. The capital Nakhon Pathom has city (thesaban nakhon) status. Further five have town (thesaban mueang) status and twenty subdistrict municipalities (thesaban tambon).

	City municipality	people
1	Nakhon Pathom	74,446

	Town municipalities	people	3	Sam Phran	17,329
1	Rai Khing	32,819	4	Nakhon Pathom	14,004
2	Krathum Lom	27,587	5	Sam Khwai Phueak	11,139

	Subdistrict mun.	people			
1	Om Yai	24,027	11	Khun Kaeo	7,915
2	Sam Ngam	13,956	12	Sisa Thong	7,221
3	Bang Kratheuk	13,056	13	Thammasala	7,086
4	Sala Ya	11,180	14	Kamphaeng Saen	7,009
5	Phrong Maduea	10,896	15	Ta Kong	6,785
6	Khlong Yong	10,526	16	Don Yai Hom	6,519
7	Bo Phlap	9,519	17	Huai Phlu	2,217
8	Map Khae	8,630	18	Bang Luang	2,163
9	Bang Len	8,429	19	Rang Krathum	2,162
10	Nakhon Chai Si	8,226	20	Lam Phaya	1,949

The non-municipal areas are administered by 91 Subdistrict Administrative
Organizations (SAO) (ongkan borihan suan tambon).

Municipalities	Communities	Groups
Rai Khing	28	3
Krathum Lom	29	-
Om Yai	26	-

== Human achievement index 2022 ==
Health	Education	Employment	Income
6	4	19	9
Housing	Family	Transport	Participation
74	33	11	56
Province Nakhon Pathom, with an HAI 2022 value of 0.6698 is "high", occupies place 6 in the ranking.

Since 2003, United Nations Development Programme (UNDP) in Thailand has tracked progress on human development at sub-national level using the Human achievement index (HAI), a composite index covering all the eight key areas of human development. National Economic and Social Development Board (NESDB) has taken over this task since 2017.

Rank	Classification
1–13	"High"
14–29	"Somewhat high"
30–45	"Average"
46–61	"Somewhat low"
62–77	"Low"

Map with provinces and HAI 2022 rankings
