= Phra Pathommachedi =

Stupa in Nakhon Pathom, Thailand

Coordinates: 13°49′11″N 100°3′37″E

Phra Pathommachedi พระปฐมเจดีย์
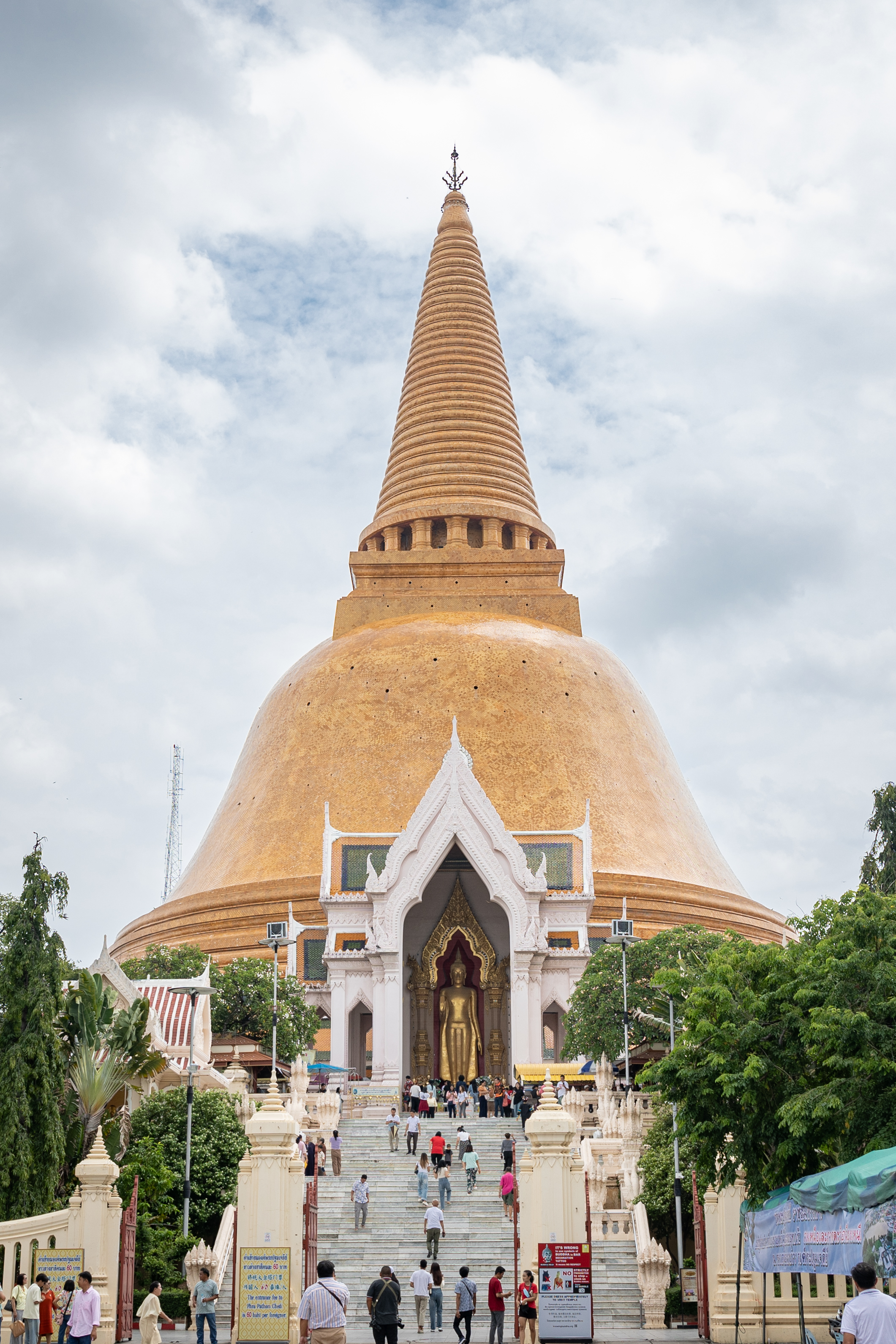
- Phra Pathommachedi

General information
- Architectural style: stupa
- Location: Nakhon Pathom, Thailand
- Construction started: 193 BCE
- Completed: 1870; 156 years ago

Height
- Height: 120.45 m (395.2 ft)

Phra Pathommachedi or Phra Pathom Chedi (Thai: พระปฐมเจดีย์) is a Buddhist stupa in Thailand. The stupa is located in the Wat Phra Pathommachedi Ratcha Wora Maha Wihan (Thai: วัดพระปฐมเจดีย์ราชวรมหาวิหาร), a temple in the town center of Nakhon Pathom, Nakhon Pathom Province, Thailand. Phra Pathommachedi is the second tallest stupa in the world. (Note: According to Chihara Daigoro, the Phra Pathom Chedi is over 120 meters high, and the current Shwemawdaw Pagoda, rebuilt in 1954, stands at 125 meters.) The top of its spire reaches 120.45 meters, with the base circumference of 235.50 meters.

The name Phra Pathommachedi means the first holy stupa, given by king Mongkut. Modern Historians believe that the stupa was one of the principal stupas of ancient Nakhon Pathom, the largest city of the ancient Mon kingdom of Dvaravati in Nakhon Pathom area together with the nearby Phra Prathon Chedi (Thai: พระประโทณเจดีย์) during the 6th to the 8th centuries.

== History ==
=== Dvaravati Period ===
The origins of Phra Pathommachedi have no historical record, but according to Subhadradis Diskul, a prominent Thai historian and archaeologist, Ashoka, an Indian Emperor who ruled almost all of the Indian subcontinent from circa 269 to 232 BCE, sent prominent Buddhist monks to expand Buddhism in Suvarnabhumi including the area that is Nakhon Pathom in the present day. A Buddhist temple, Wat Phra Pathom, had been established around the year 325 BCE, and the stupa had been built around the year 193 BCE. The original structure is believed to be similar with the Great Stupa in Sanchi, India, with a simple hemispherical brick structure built over the relics of Gautama Buddha with a structure on the top of the stupa in the shape of a chatra or parasol symbolising high rank. The stupa is first mentioned in Buddhist texts of the year 675, however archaeological findings date back to the 4th century. Modern Historians believe that the stupa was one of the principal stupas of ancient Nakhon Pathom, the largest settlement of Dvaravati culture together with the nearby Phra Prathon Chedi (พระประโทณเจดีย์) during the 6th to the 8th centuries.

=== Legend of Phaya Gong and Phaya Phan ===
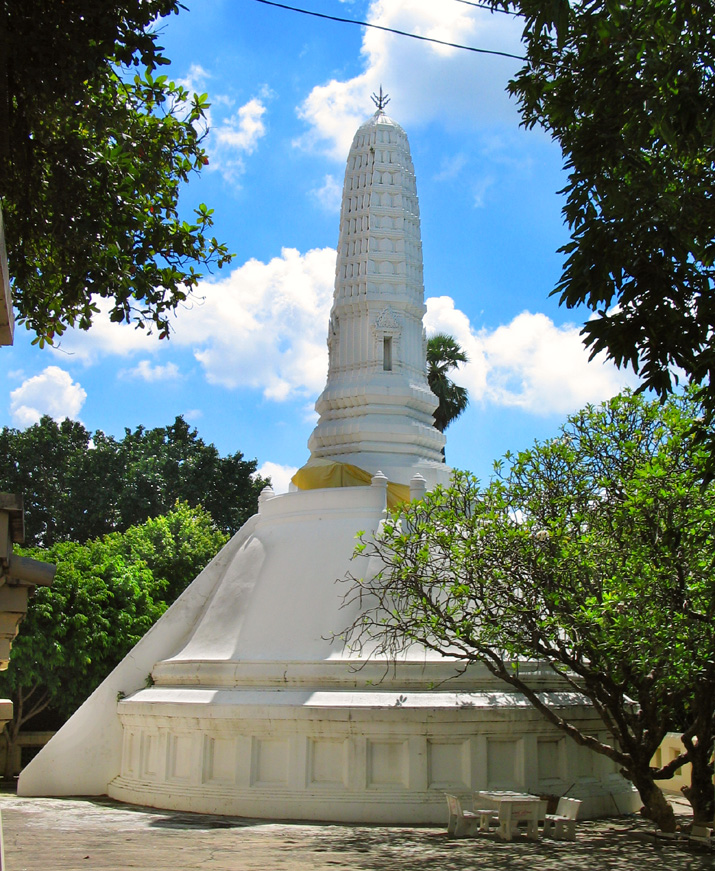
Replica of Phra Pathommachedi before restoration

Since the origin of Phra Pathommachedi is unknown, there are many legends about the stupa construction. The most famous is the legend of Phraya Gong and Phraya Phan (Thai: ตำนานพระยากงพระยาพาน). The story is about a king of Nakhon Chai Si, Phraya Gong, who had a son named Phan. The court astrologer predicted that Phan will commit patricide in the future. Phraya Gong then abandoned Phan. The orphan baby had been unknowingly adopted by a childless woman named Granny Hom. Granny Hom raised Phan in Ratchaburi, a vassal city state of Nakhon Chai Si. One day an elephant belonging to a lord from Ratchaburi was in rut and begun attacking people. Phan went to see the elephant and was able to subdue it. After the lord from Ratchaburi heard about heroic act of Phan, he adopted Phan as his son. Phan wanted to conquer Nakhon Chaisi of Phraya Gong, so he sent a letter to Phraya Gong for challenging him to an elephant duel. Phan killed Phraya Gong becoming king Phraya Phan. According to an ancient custom, Phraya Phan demanded Phraya Gong's wife to become his queen. When the queen met Phraya Phan, she recognized him to be her son, and told him the truth. Shocked and fearful of the truth getting out, Phraya Phan executes Granny Hom. After realising that he committed a great sin by killing both father and a person who raised him - Granny Hom. In the year 26 BCE, Phraya Phan consulted with a group of arhats how to atone for his sin. The arhats recommended Phraya Phan to build a great stupa, one which is of great height that even a bird can not fly higher. Phraya Phan then built a Sri Lankan style stupa by using a very big gong and his bed as a foundation and put Buddha's tooth relic inside. Hundreds of years later, the king of Bago wanted the big gong, so he ordered his men to dig the stupa's foundation; as a result, both gong and stupa then collapsed. The Bago king tried to rebuild the stupa, so he built a Khmer style stupa on the top of this old stupa, which was the stupa form until the reign of king Mongkut.

=== Mongkut Discovery ===
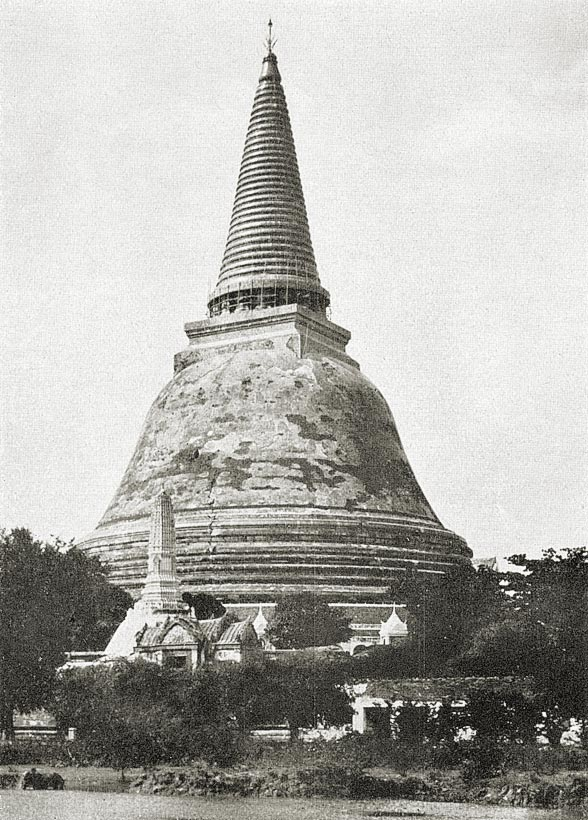
Phra Pathommachedi in 1925

In 1831 under the reign of king Rama III, his brother, Prince Mongkut, as a monk, discovered the ruin of Phra Pathommachedi, the pagoda with the prang shaped top with 84 meters high and visited several times. He requested royal approval to restore the stupa, but Rama III declined. In 1832 Sunthorn Phu, a famous Thai poet, accompanied Prince Chutamani on a visit to Phra Pathommachedi. After his coronation, Mongkut rebuilt the stupa in the Sri Lankan style, covering the old stupa as well as the new temple. The new temple has four viharas used for Buddhist ceremonies as well as many storage buildings to keep artifacts that were found in the nearby area. Mongkut also built a palace named Pathom Nakorn Palace near Phra Pathommachedi. Damrong Rajanubhab mentioned the reason for building this palace in the book “Tamnaan Wang Gao” (or Tales of the Old Palaces) that during the renovation of Phra Pathommachedi, it was inconvenient to come and go from Bangkok to Nakhon Pathom within a day, thus staying overnight was obligatory. Under the royal command of Mongkut, the palace was built near the stupa. The canals of Mahasawas and Chedi Bucha were also dug to facilitate commuting by boat between Bangkok and Nakhon Pathom. After 17 years of construction, the stupa and temple were finished in 1870 in the reign of Chulalongkorn. Chulalongkorn added belfries and imported golden brown colour tiles from China to cover the whole stupa. The population of nearby Nakhon Chai Si District was ordered to move to the newly created city around Phra Pathommachedi.

=== Later Development ===
In 1907 as a Crown Prince, Vajiravudh, after visited Phra Pathommachedi for several times, he decided to build Sanam Chandra Palace in Nakhon Pathom. He recorded the miracle stories of Phra Pathommachedi as well as renovated the stupa complex. In 1911 he built the 7.20 metres Buddha image and named Phra Ruang Rojanarit Sri Indraditya Dhammobhas Mahavajiravudhraj Pujaneeya Bophitr (Thai: พระร่วงโรจนฤทธิ์ ศรีอินทราทิตย์ธรรโมภาส มหาวชิราวุธราชปูชนียบพิตร) and installed in the front niche of Phra Pathommachedi. The ashes of Vajiravudh, his consort Suvadhana, and his daughter Bejaratana are kept at Phra Pathommachedi. Prajadhipok rebuilt ordination hall. In 1940 Nakhon Pathom Province selected Phra Pathommachedi as the symbol in provincial seal.

Seal of Nakhon Pathom

In 1966, the temple abbot found several cracks inside the stupa. Ministry of Interior sent a group of experts to check the stupa. After nine years research, the experts group reported that the stupa was in critical state and needed urgent restoration. The restoration finished in 1981. In 2008 Phra Pathommachedi had been restored again to solve inside stupa moisture problem, the works done in 2012.

=== Giant Incense Incident ===
In 1998 to celebrate the 84th birthday of Phra Ruang Buddha image, Wat Phra Pathommachedi constructed three giant incense sticks to be the biggest incense stick in the world in front of the Northern Vihara. On November 2, 1998, the incense collapsed immediately causing 5 deaths and 13 injuries.

=== World Heritage Site Nomination ===
In 2009 Department of Fine Arts, Ministry of Culture announced a plan to promote Phra Pathommachedi to be UNESCO World Heritage Site because of the stupa's long history and its significance on Buddhism expansion in Southeast Asia and Dvaravati culture. Initially the government plan had been welcomed by media and general public and supported by local municipal office as well as the temple. However the plan caused concerns to local people around Phra Pathommachedi which located in the city center and near city central fresh market. Fearing that if Phra Pathommachedi becomes World Heritage Site, the market may have to relocate and the whole community may affect from management plan of UNESCO, locals started to protest the plan. In 2011, Department of Fine Arts organized the public hearings in Phra Pathommachedi Temple on World Heritage Site nomination, by vote only 3 persons from 200 supported the nomination.

== Geography ==
Phra Pathommachedi Stupa and surrounding temple are located on the flat floodplain of Chao Phraya - Tha Chin rivers watershed. The land of temple has been filled up and the sewerage system has been created, but the temple complex still floods occasionally after heavy rain especially the grass fields around the stupa. In 1996 the temple grass fields have been cemented to prevent flood.

== Architecture ==
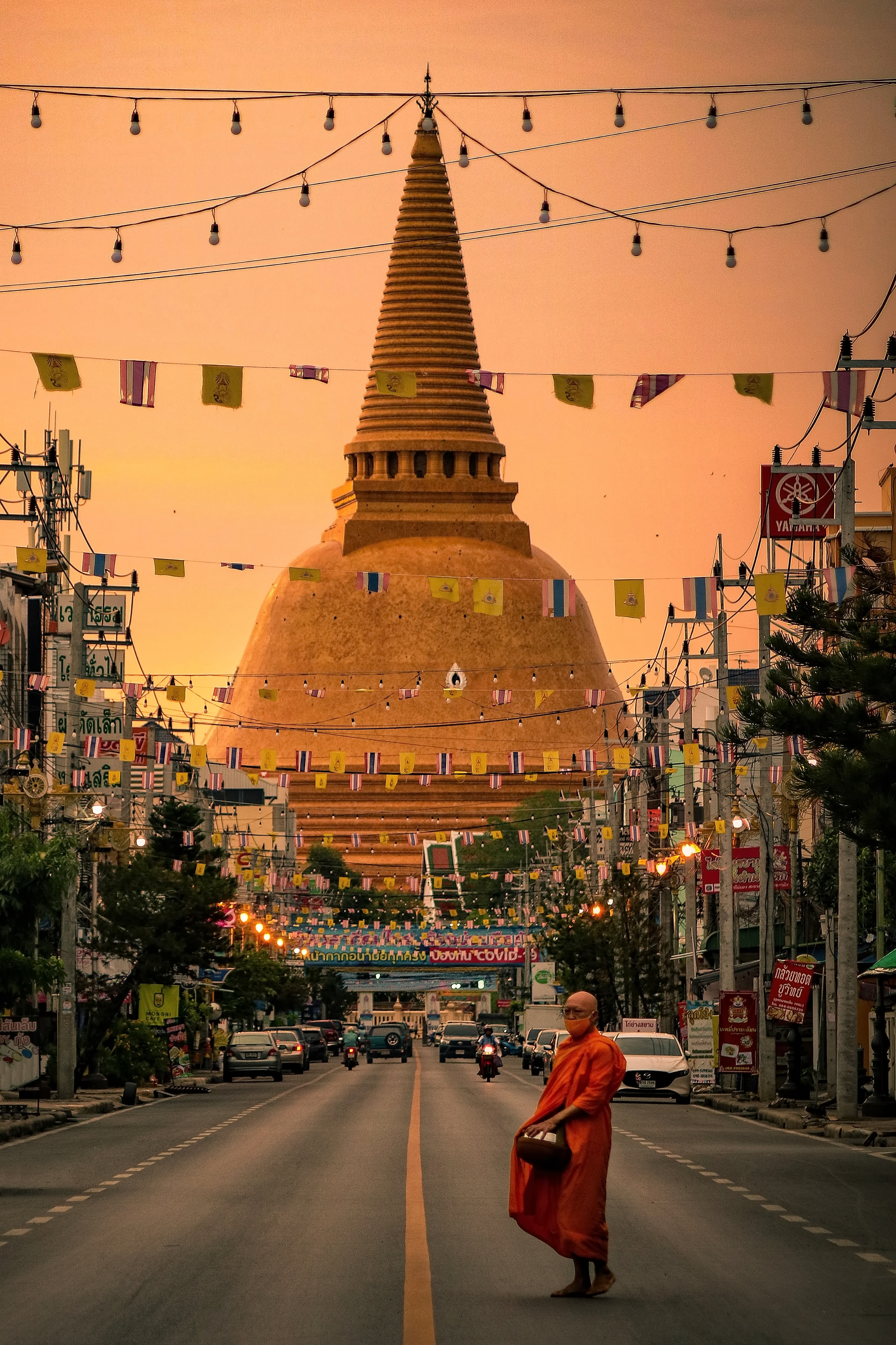
Buddhist monks on an alms round in front of Phra Pathommachedi.

The design of Phra Pathommachedi complex, when viewed from above, takes the form of a giant Buddhist mandala, simultaneously representing the Buddhist cosmology with Phra Pathommachedi in the center.

=== Phra Pathommachedi ===
Phra Pathommachedi is the tallest stupa in Thailand, standing at 120.45 meters and with circumference of 235.50 meters. The current form of Pathommachedi is bell shape Sri Lanka styled brick stupa covered by golden brown colour tiles. The structure foundation of the stupa is timbers strapped by gigantic metal chain. There is a gilded niche which installed Buddha image at the eastern direction. The stupa surrounds by inner boundary wall. then 562 meters round cloister. The cloister has inner and outer open galleries. Inner open gallery has ancient Khmer language inscriptions. Outer open gallery has collection of Buddha images. At four Cardinal directions of the cloister have a vihara. In front of each vihara has grand staircase leading to lower terrace. The stupa, viharas and round cloister complex surrounds by outer boundary wall. Between the cloister and outer boundary wall has 24 belfries.

=== Northern Vihara ===
Originally called Viharn Prasuth (วิหารประสูติ), built by Mongkut in 1861. In 1900 after the construction of railway from Bangkok to Nakhon Pathom and Nakhon Pathom railway station in the north of Phra Pathommachedi, the Northern Vihara has become the main entrance to Phra Pathommachedi. Saovabha Phongsri built two levels grand staircase in front of the vihara as an entrance to the stupa complex in 1906. In 1913, Vajiravudh appointed Prince Narisara Nuwattiwong, a notable Thai architect, to redesign the vihara to install the 7.2 metres (24 ft) Phra Ruang Rojanarit Sri Indraditya Dhammobhas Mahavajiravudhraj Pujaneeya Bophitr (พระร่วงโรจนฤทธิ์ ศรีอินทราทิตย์ธรรโมภาส มหาวชิราวุธราชปูชนียบพิตร). The beautiful new T-shaped vihara with apse liked portico in the front was completed in 1915 and has been called Viharn Phra Ruang (วิหารพระร่วง) after since. The wall behind the Buddha image is where the royal ashes of Vajiravudh and his family have been kept. Inside the vihara is a baby Buddha statue as a principal image side by two female statues.

=== Eastern Vihara ===
Officially the main entrance of Phra Pathommachedi complex. Eastern Vihara or Viharn Luang (Thai: วิหารหลวง) is a single storey reinforced concrete building with traditional Thai temple glazed tiles roof built by Mongkut on 18 December 1861. Inside has two rooms, inner room and outer room. The inner room has mural paintings depicting the stories of restoration of Phra Pathommachedi throughout the history and the gathering of heaven. The mural was paint during the reign of Vajiravudh with interesting mix of Dvaravati and modern Thai styles. There is no wall on the side of Phra Pathommachaedi to allow worshipper to see the stupa. Directly opposite the vihara is a gilded niche attached to Phra Pathommachedi. Inside the niche is the copy image of Phra Phuttha Sihing from the Front Palace. The outer room housing the principal Buddha image of the Eastern Vihara, Phra Nirantarai (Thai: พระนิรันตราย), also built by Mongkut, behind the image has mural painting of sacred tree. In the front of vihara has a portico housing Phra Phuttha Maha Vajira Maravichai Buddha image (Thai: พระพุทธมหาวชิรมารวิชัย), built by then Crown Prince Vajiralongkorn in 1984 when he was a Bhikku. In 2001 on behalf of Sirikit, Vajiralongkorn installed the Buddha image on the newly-built pedestal. On the lower terrace in front of vihara has ordination hall, meditation hall and a platform erected specially for a king to mount an elephant or a palanquin.

=== Southern Vihara ===
Southern Vihara or Phra Panchawaki Vihara (Thai: วิหารปัญจวัคคีย์) is a single storey reinforced concrete building with traditional Thai temple glazed tiles roof built by Mongkut on 18 December 1861. Inside has two rooms, inner room and outer room. The inner room has an image of Buddha with Mucalinda. The outer room housing the principal Buddha image of the Southern Vihara with statues of his first five disciples. The inner room has mural paintings depicting Phra Pathommachedi throughout the history as well as Buddhist sacred sites in India. On the lower terrace in front of Southern Vihara has a large Dvaravati stone buddha named Phra Phuttha Noraseth or Phra Sila Khao (Thai: พระพุทธนรเชษฐ์ หรือ พระศิลาขาว). Originally enshrined in the abandoned Na Phra Meru Temple, with unknown reason the image has been divided and kept in various places. In 1967 Department of Fine Arts successfully assembled all the fragments of the image and gave to the temple of Phra Pathommachedi.

=== Western Vihara ===
Western Vihara or Reclining Buddha Vihara or Viharn Phra Noan (Thai: วิหารพระนอน) is a two rooms single storey reinforced concrete building with traditional Thai temple glazed tiles roof built by Mongkut on 18 December 1861. Inside housing 17 metres Reclining Buddha image. Before the redesign of Northern Vihara in 1913, the design of this vihara was different from other three viharas, as the building was built in T-shaped building and in parallel direction of the gallery because the original Western Vihara was built before the whole complex renovation by Mongkut. The original Reclining Buddha image was 8 metres and was the principal Buddha image of Phra Pathommachedi. Another room inside vihara is kept smaller Reclining Buddha image built by Mongkut, but the room is closing from public. On the lower terrace in front of vihara has many sacred trees that related to the story of Buddha as well as two Chinese stone dolls.

=== Ordination hall ===
The current ordination hall or ubosoth hall (Thai: พระอุโบสถ), from the entrance, is located on the left in front of Northern Vihara on lower terrace, originally built by Mongkut and rebuilt by Prajadhipok with design of Narisara Nuvadtivongs in 1932. The ordination hall is a single storey reinforced concrete building with traditional Thai temple glazed tiles roof. The principal Buddha image is the ancient 3.75 metre large white stone craved sitting Buddha image on the lotus petals shaped pedestral. The image was built in Dvaravati period. Originally enshrined in the abandoned Na Phra Meru Temple, in the south of Phra Pathommachedi. In 1861 Mongkut moved the Buddha image to be the principal image of the ordination hall. There are four marble Bai Sema attached into the hall, and at the entrance adorned by two stone Chinese lion statues. The front facade depicting Dharmacakra and two sitting deer.

=== Mediation hall ===
Phra Pathommachedi Museum or Phra Pathomchedi Museum building (Thai: พระปฐมเจดีย์พิพิธภัณฑ์สถาน) is originally a mediation hall and is located opposite the ordination hall and from the entrance, is located on the right in front of Northern Vihara on lower terrace. Later the building has been renovated and used as temple museum. The ordination hall is a single storey reinforced concrete building with traditional Thai temple glazed tiles roof. The collection includes many old Buddha images and talipot fans.

== Wat Phra Pathommachedi ==
Wat Phra Pathommachedi Ratcha Wora Maha Wihan (Thai: วัดพระปฐมเจดีย์ราชวรมหาวิหาร) or Wat Phra Pathommachedi, is a large temple in the city center of Nakhon Pathom. The temple consists of Phra Pathommachedi Stupa zone and the monastic zone. The monastic zone is located in the southwest of Phra Pathommachedi Stupa zone separated by Khwaphra Road. Both zones are surrounding by wall to show boundaries. Wat Phra Pathommachedi is the first rank royal temple of Ratcha Wora Maha Wihan, the highest category of Thai royal temple. Locals called the temple, Wat Yai (Thai: วัดใหญ่), which means the big temple. Original names of the temple are Wat Phra Pathom (Thai: วัดพระประธม) or Wat Phra Banthom (Thai: วัดพระบรรทม) and Wat Phra Phut Borommathat (Thai: วัดพระพุทธบรมธาตุ). The temple belongs to Maha Nikaya sect of Theravada Buddhist monks in Thailand. The temple was found around the year 325 BCE before the construction of Phra Pathommachedi. Mongkut revived the temple in 1853 as a part of Phra Pathommachedi restoration plan. The total area of the temple is approximately 0.25 Square Kilometre. Originally the monastic area was located in the area of present-day lower terrace in front of Southern Vihara. Mongkut built the new monastic area in front of Northern Vihara with 25 living buildings, a sermon hall and a dining hall. After built a railway station and the Northern Vihara became the main entrance, Chulalongkorn relocated the monastic area to the present location.

List of Temple Abbot

- Chao Athikarn Paen (Thai: เจ้าอธิการแป้น) (1857–1865)
- Phra Sanit Samanakhun (Kaew) (Thai: พระสนิทสมณคุณ (แก้ว)) (1865–1868)
- Phra Pathom Jetiyanurak (Thai: พระปฐมเจติยานุรักษ์ (กล่ำ)) (1868–1904)
- Phra Ratchamoli Sonuttaro (Thai: พระราชโมลี โสณุตตโร) (1909–1911)
- Phra Phuttharakkhita (Ploy) (Thai: พระพุทธรักขิต (พลอย)) (1911–1919)
- Phra Dhammawarodom Dhammappajotiko (Thai: พระธรรมวโรดม ธมฺมปฺปโชติโก) (1919–1954)
- Phra Dhamsirichai Jitavipulo (Thai: พระธรรมสิริชัย ชิตวิปุโล) (1954–1984)
- Phra Ratsirichaimuni (Thai: พระราชสิริชัยมุนี) (1985–1993)
- Phra Dhampariyatwaythi (Suthep Phussadhammo) (Thai: พระธรรมปริยัติเวที (สุเทพ ผุสฺสธมฺโม) (1993– )

== Wat Phra Pathom Chedi school ==
Established in 1866 by Chulalongkorn, as the first school in Nakhon Pathom inside the sermon hall of Wat Phra Pathommachedi, a part of Phra Pathommachedi complex. In 1922 two buildings had been built for school buildings by donation money from the Governor of Nakhon Chai Si, Phaya Mahindhara Dejanuwat. The school was officially named by Vajiravudh, Wat Phra Pathom Chedi School (Mahidharasuksakarn). The school is now an elementary school under Office of the Basic Education Commission, but occasionally received supporting money from Wat Phra Pathommachedi to develop facilities of the school.

== Phra Pathommachedi National Museum ==
Initiated in the reign of King Chulalongkorn by Damrong Rajanubhab, who planned to gather artefacts scattered across Nakhon Pathom, Phra Pathommachedi National Museum (Thai: พิพิธภัณฑ์สถานแห่งชาติพระปฐมเจดีย์) has developed over time. Its current exhibition presents the history of the province and consists of three sections. Zone 1 starts with an introduction to present-day Nakhon Pathom, including its geography, economy and demography. This is followed by its history. Visitors will see evidence of prehistoric dwellers found in the area, dating back 2,000–3,000 years. Zone 2 of the museum focuses on beliefs and religions through art mostly related to Buddhism - the main faith of Dvaravati culture. Zone 3 showcases the history and development of Nakhon Pathom during the Rattanakosin period. Objects on view include a model of Pathom Nakhon Palace, the residence of king Mongkut during his visit to Nakhon Pathom, and Buddha images found at Phra Pathommachedi as well as a model of present-day Nakhon Pathom town. The highlights are models of Phra Pathommachedi, whose shape has been altered several times since the Dvaravati period.

== Phra Pathommachedi in literature ==
Since Phra Pathommachedi has become an important destination for pilgrimage, many poets wrote poetries about the stupa. One of the earliest is the work of Prince Wongsathiratsanit, Nirat Phra Pathom (Thai: นิราศพระประธม) in 1834 and the most famous one is Sunthorn Phu's Nirat Phra Pathom (Thai: นิราศพระประธม) in 1842.

== Annual festival ==
=== Phra Pathommachedi Festival ===
The annual Phra Pathommachedi Festival (Thai: เทศกาลนมัสการองค์พระปฐมเจดีย์ ประจำปี) takes place from the evening of the full moon of the 12th month to the 4th day of the waning moon in the 12th month in the traditional Thai lunar calendar. In the Gregorian calendar this usually falls in November. Since 1974 Wat Phra Pathommachedi organized the festival in order to raise money to maintain the stupa and the temple. Normally the festival takes place for 5 days 5 nights or 9 days 9 nights, as decided by the festival committee.

=== Phra Ruang birthday ceremony ===
2 November is considered birthday of Phra Ruang Rojanarit Buddha image, and Wat Phra Pathommachedi organizes a ceremony to celebrate. The ceremony attracts thousands of worshippers. The highlight of the ceremony is a lucky draw to find a person to be a representative of all worshippers to set the light in front of the Buddha image. Most of worshippers bring red painted boiled eggs and yellow flower garlands to worship the Buddha image.

== Gallery ==
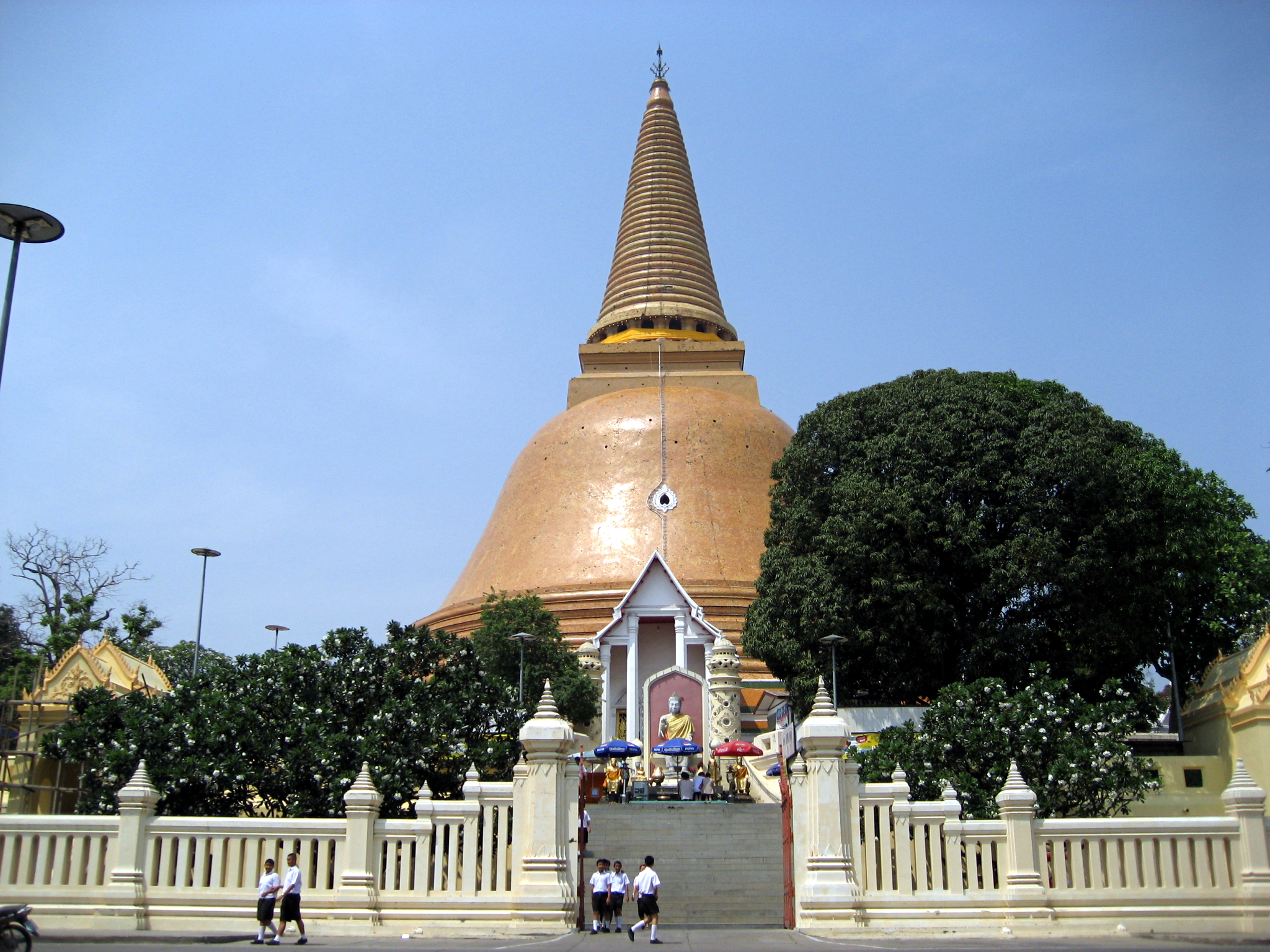

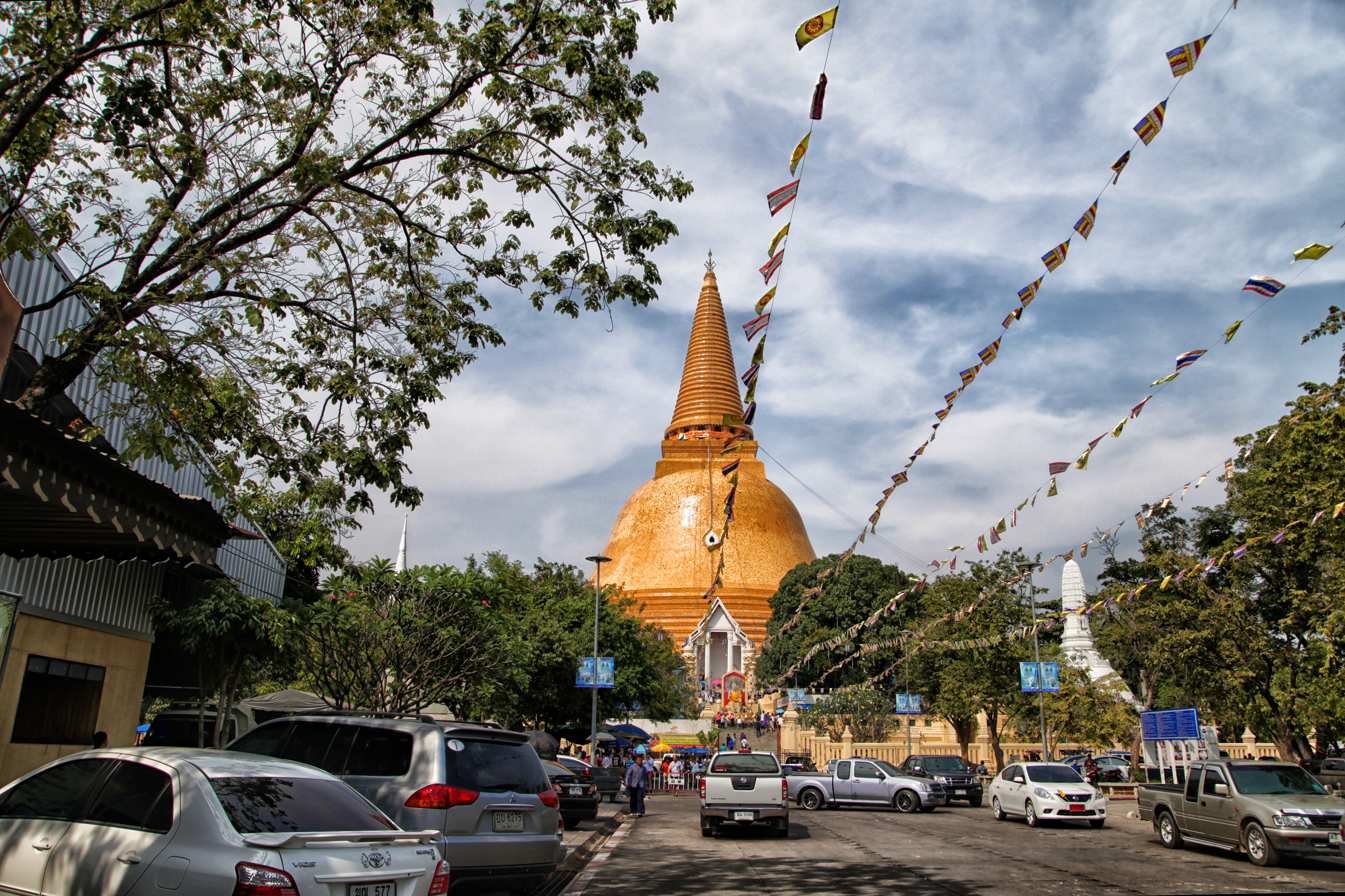

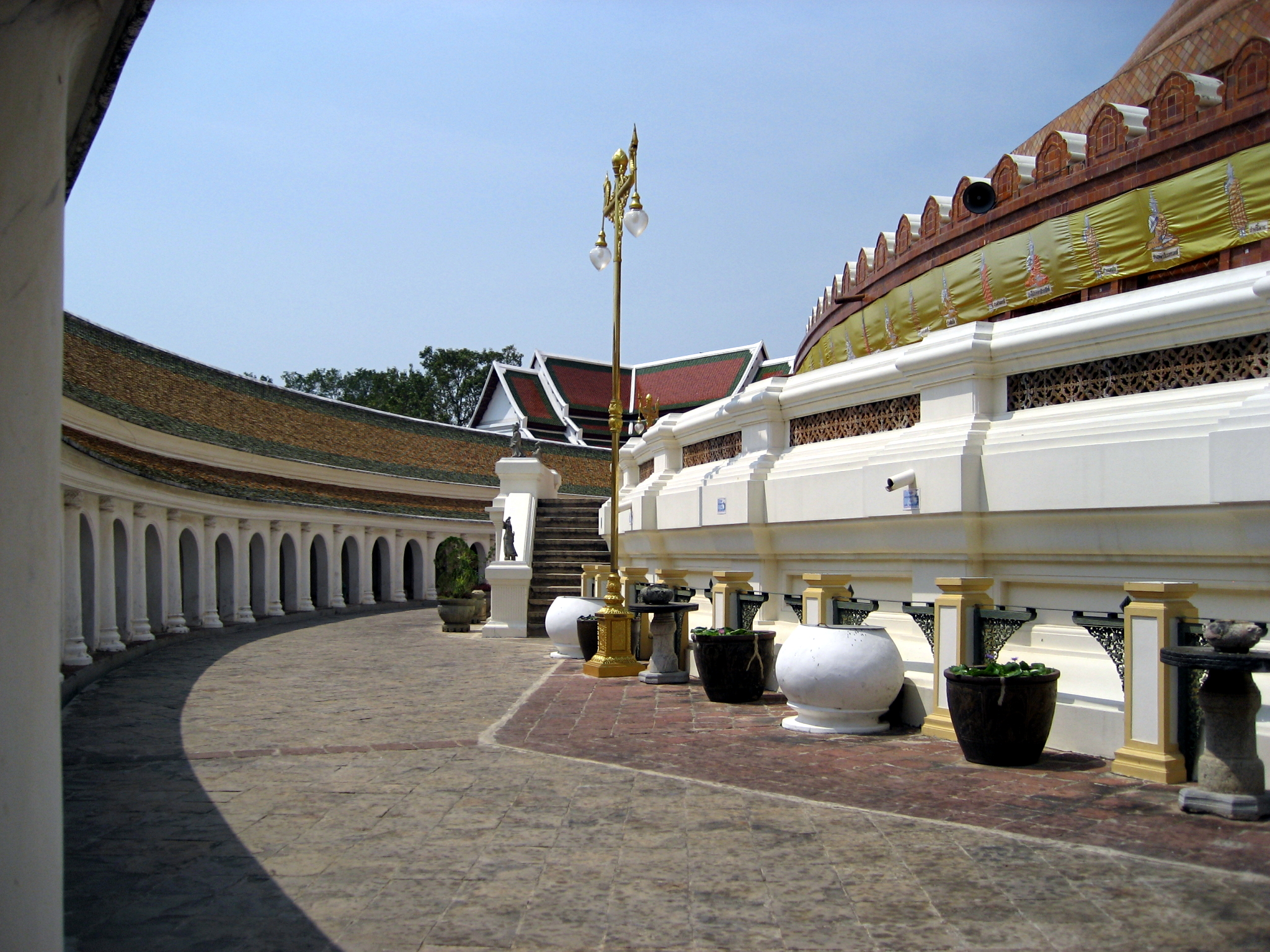

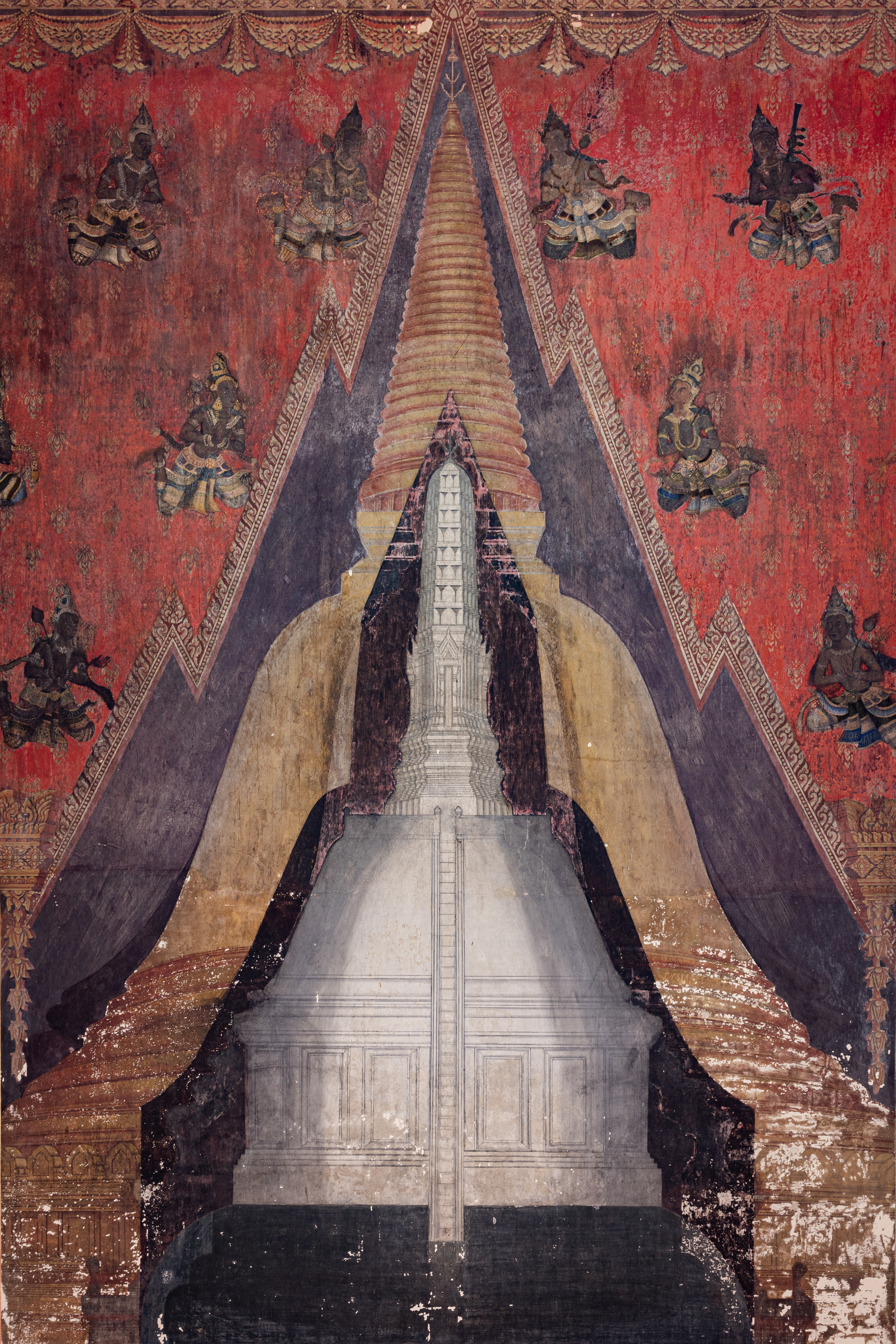

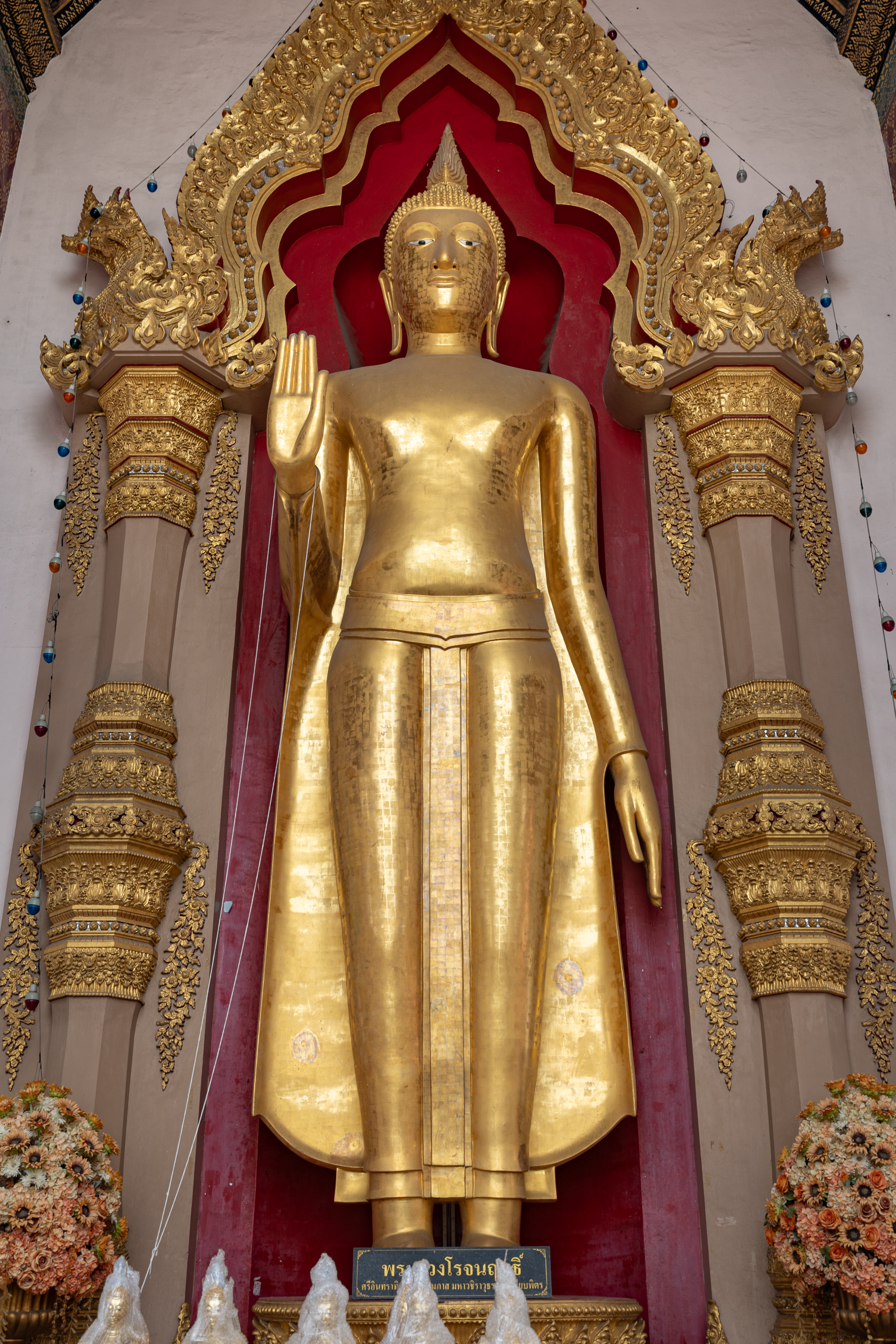

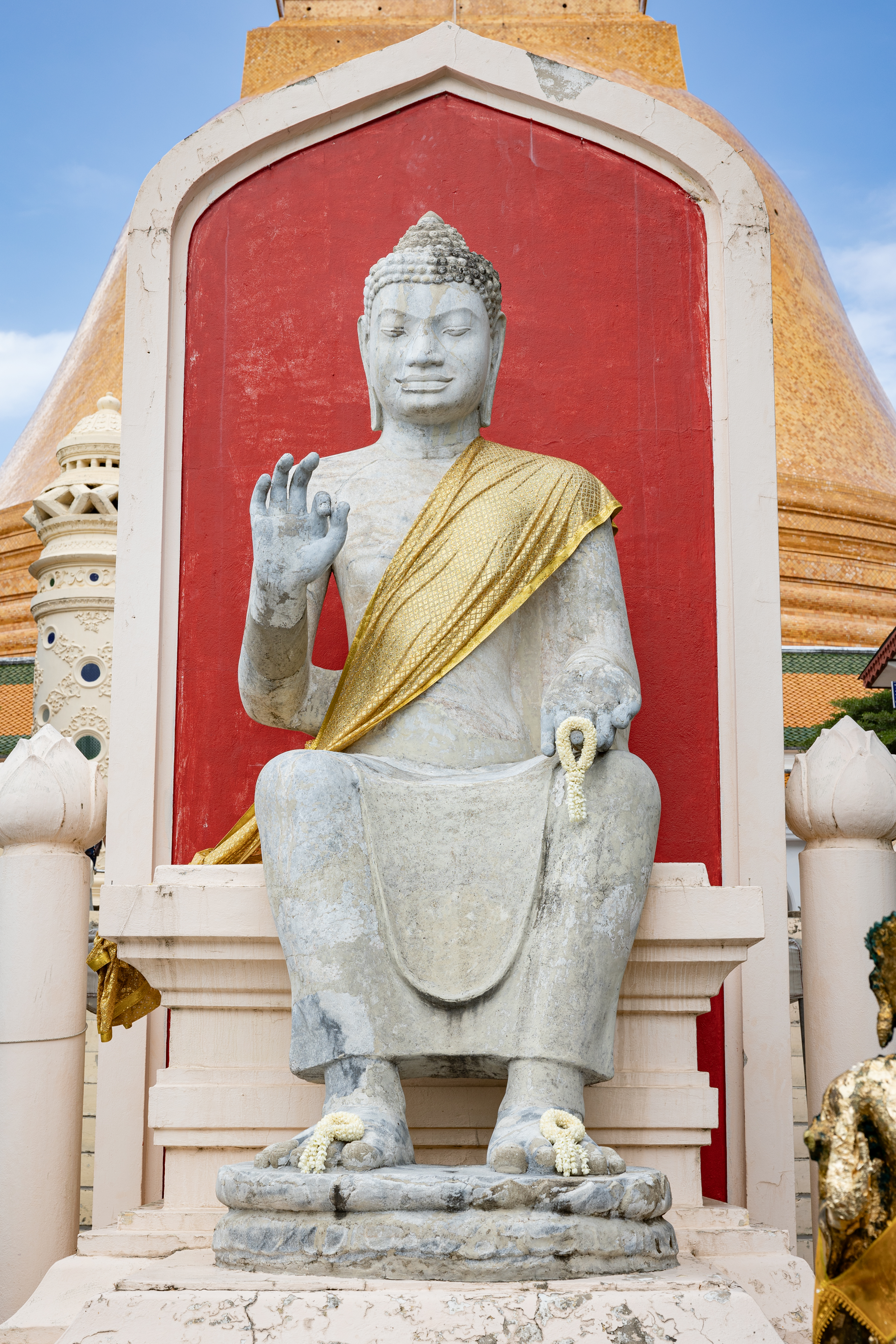

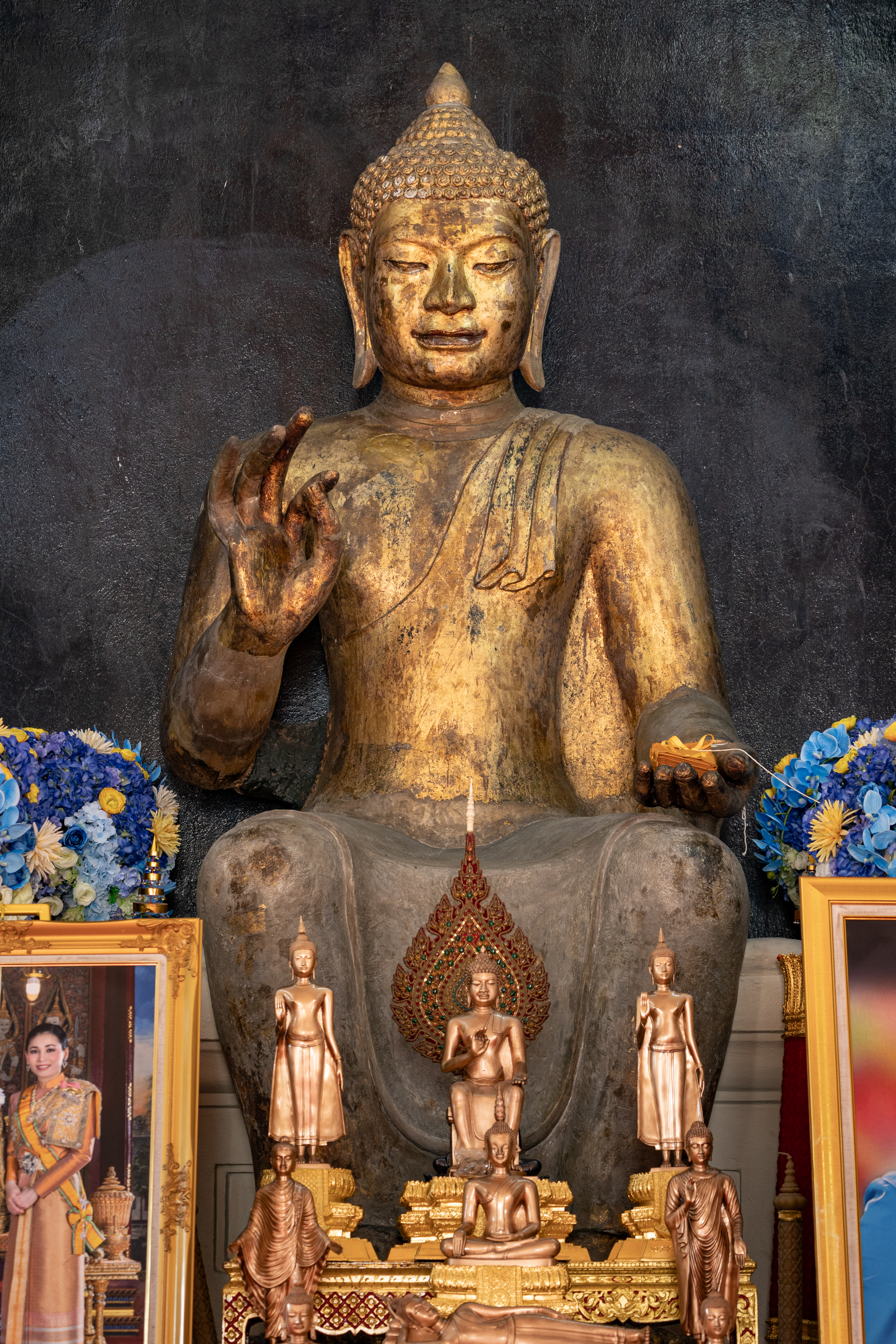

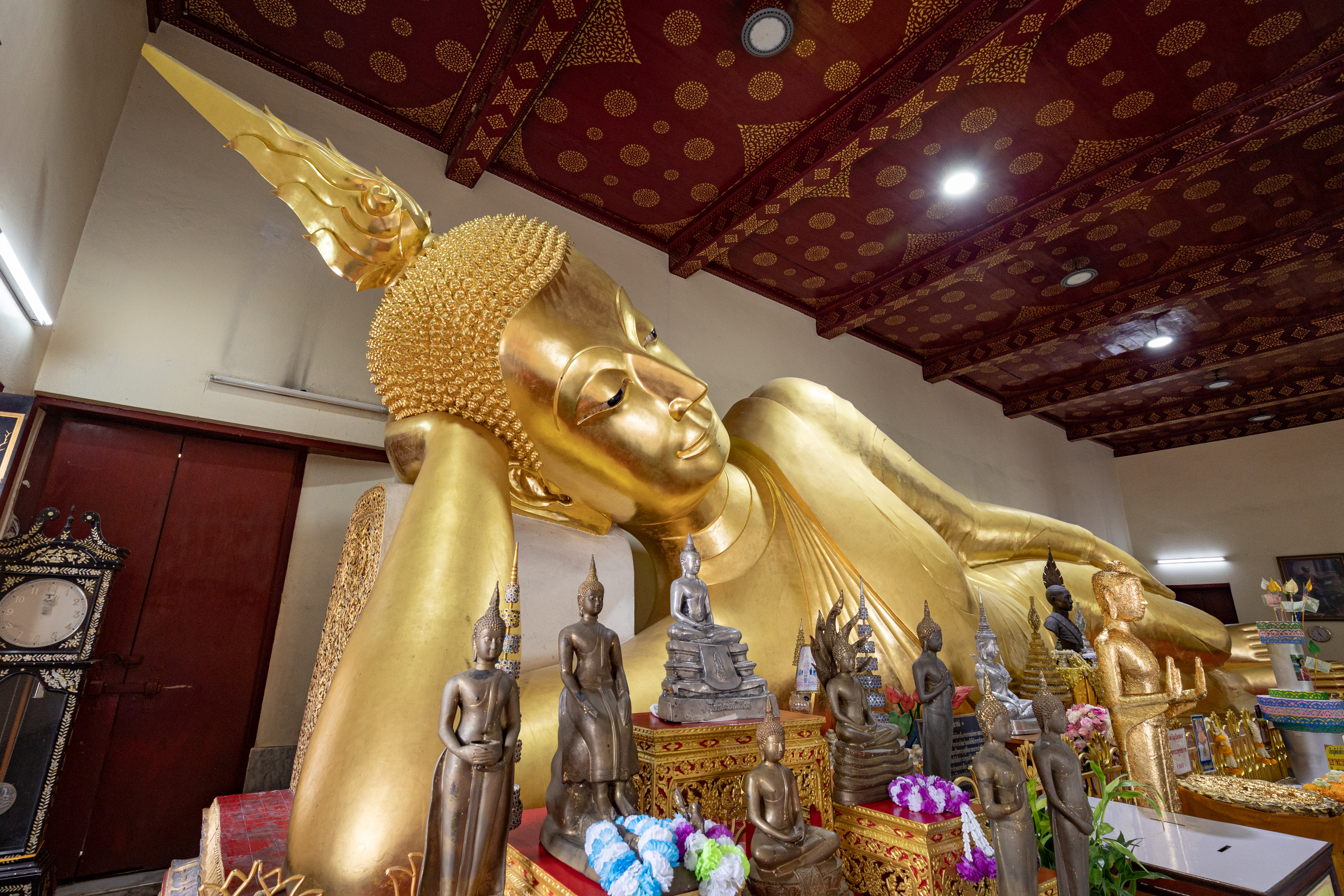

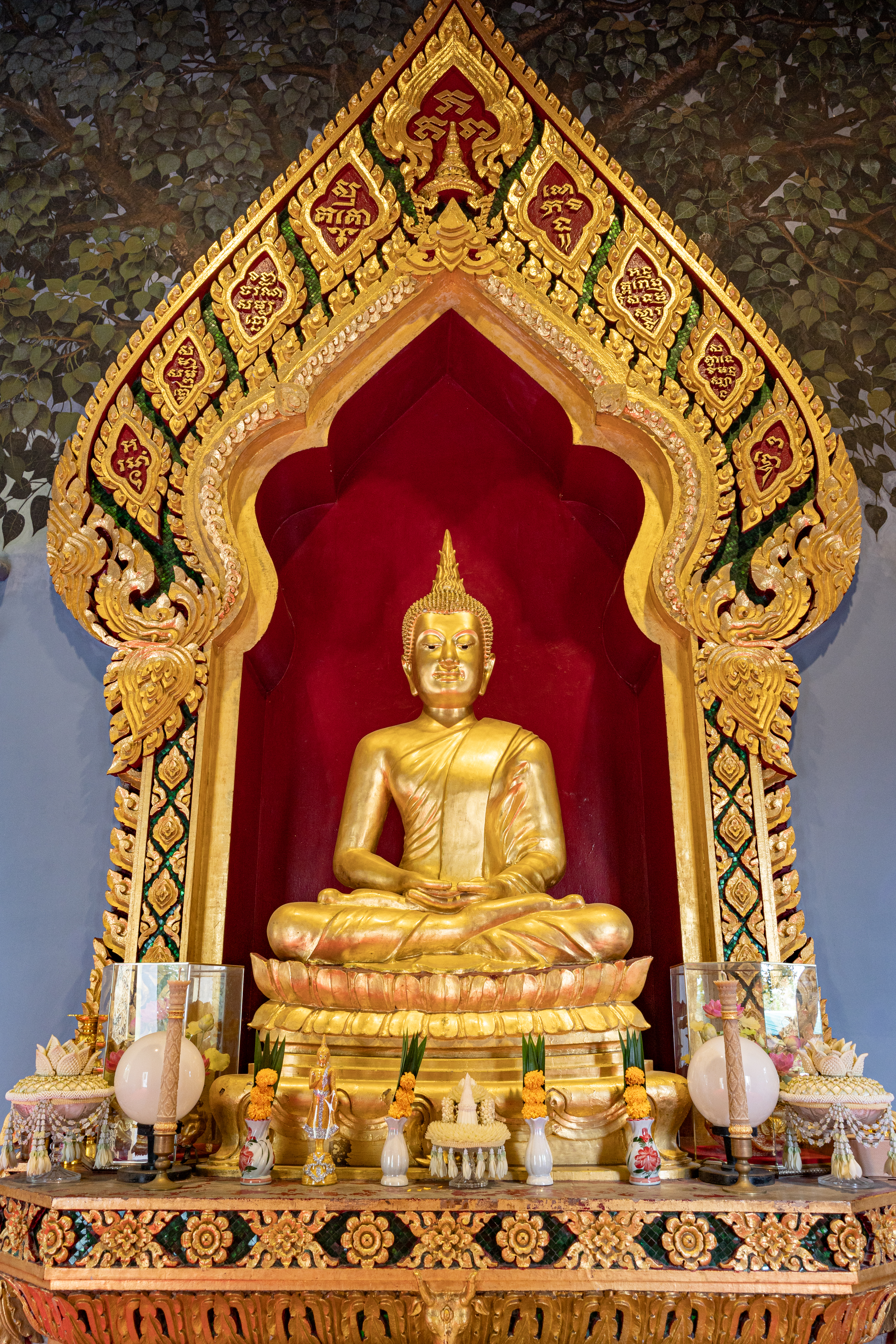

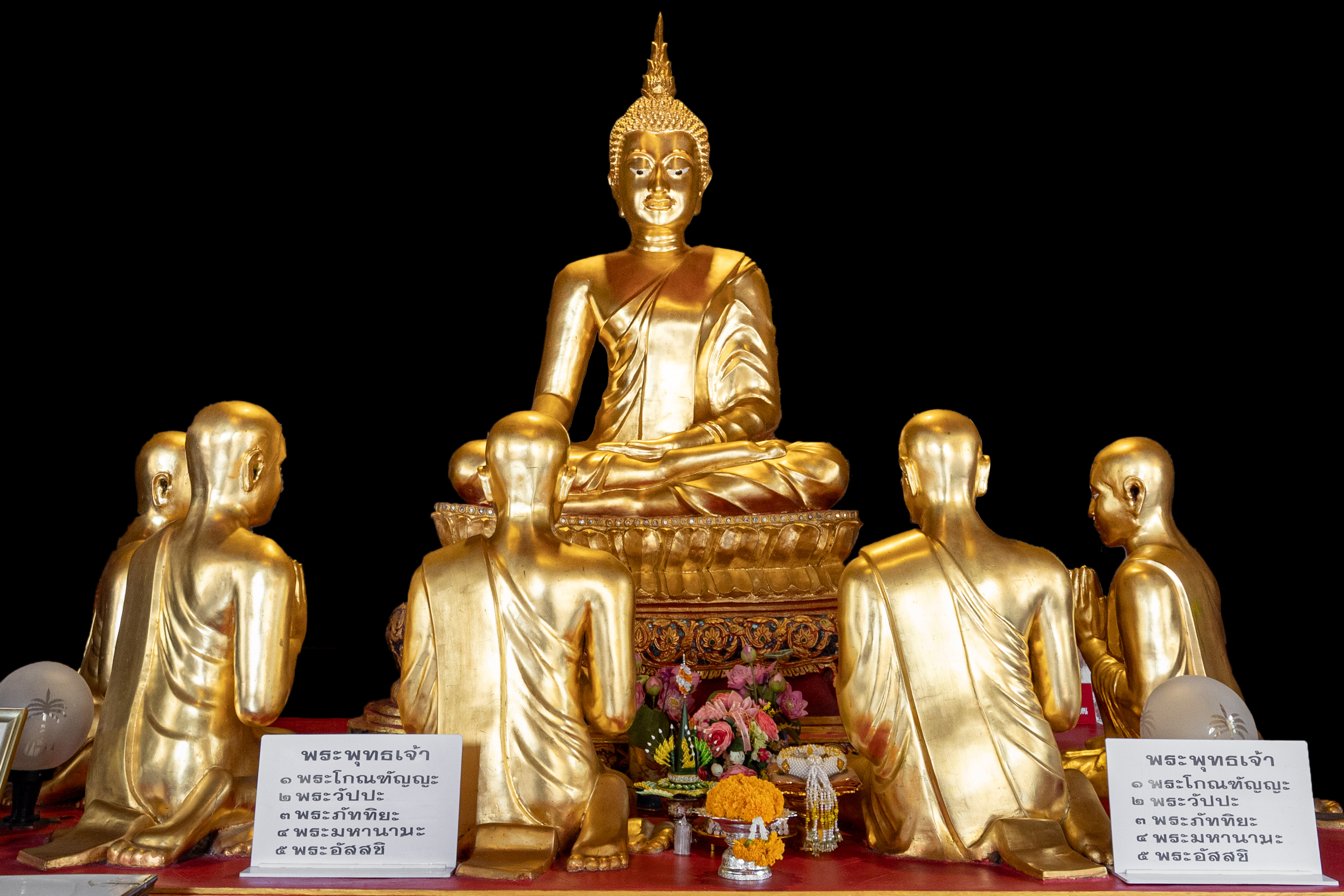

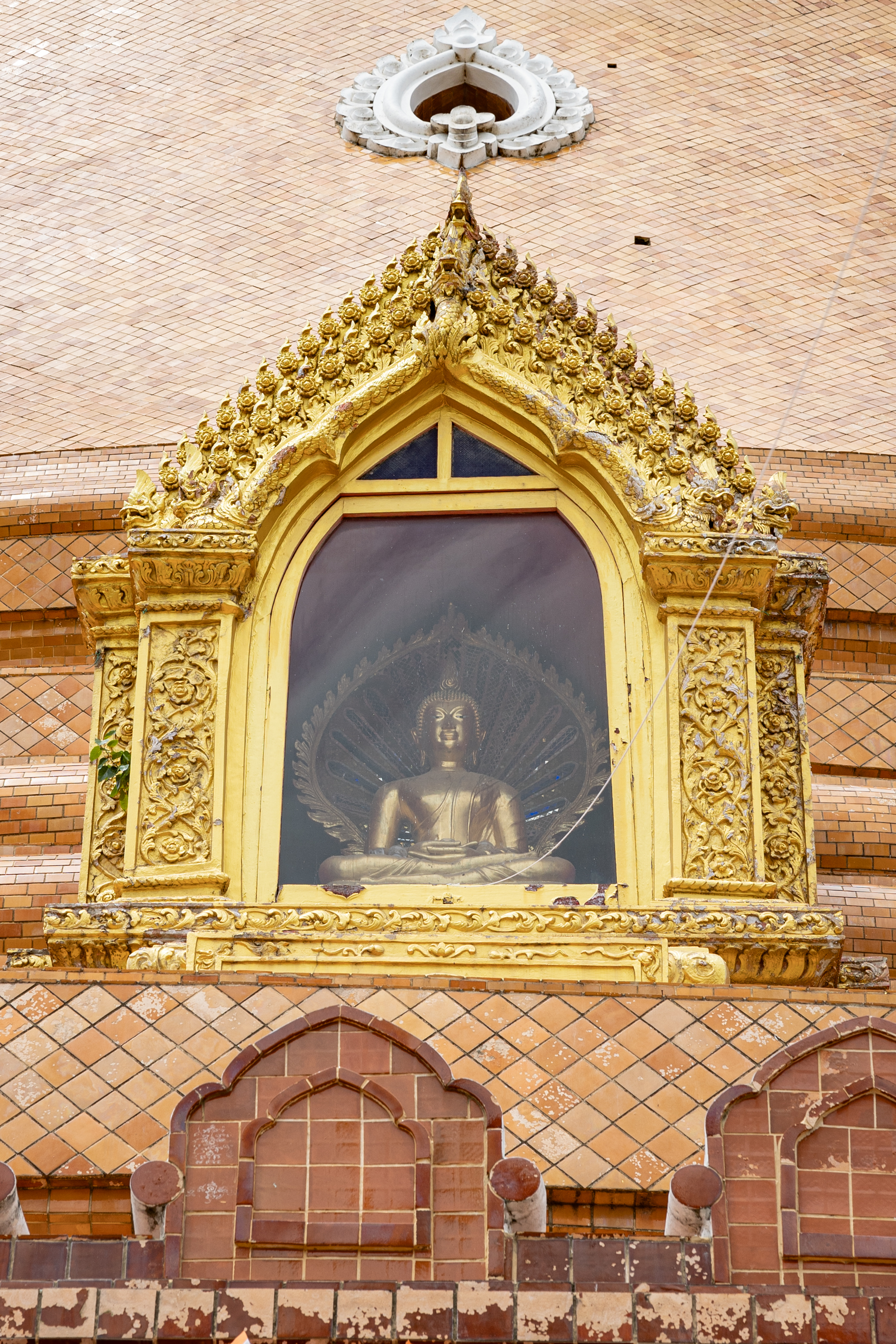

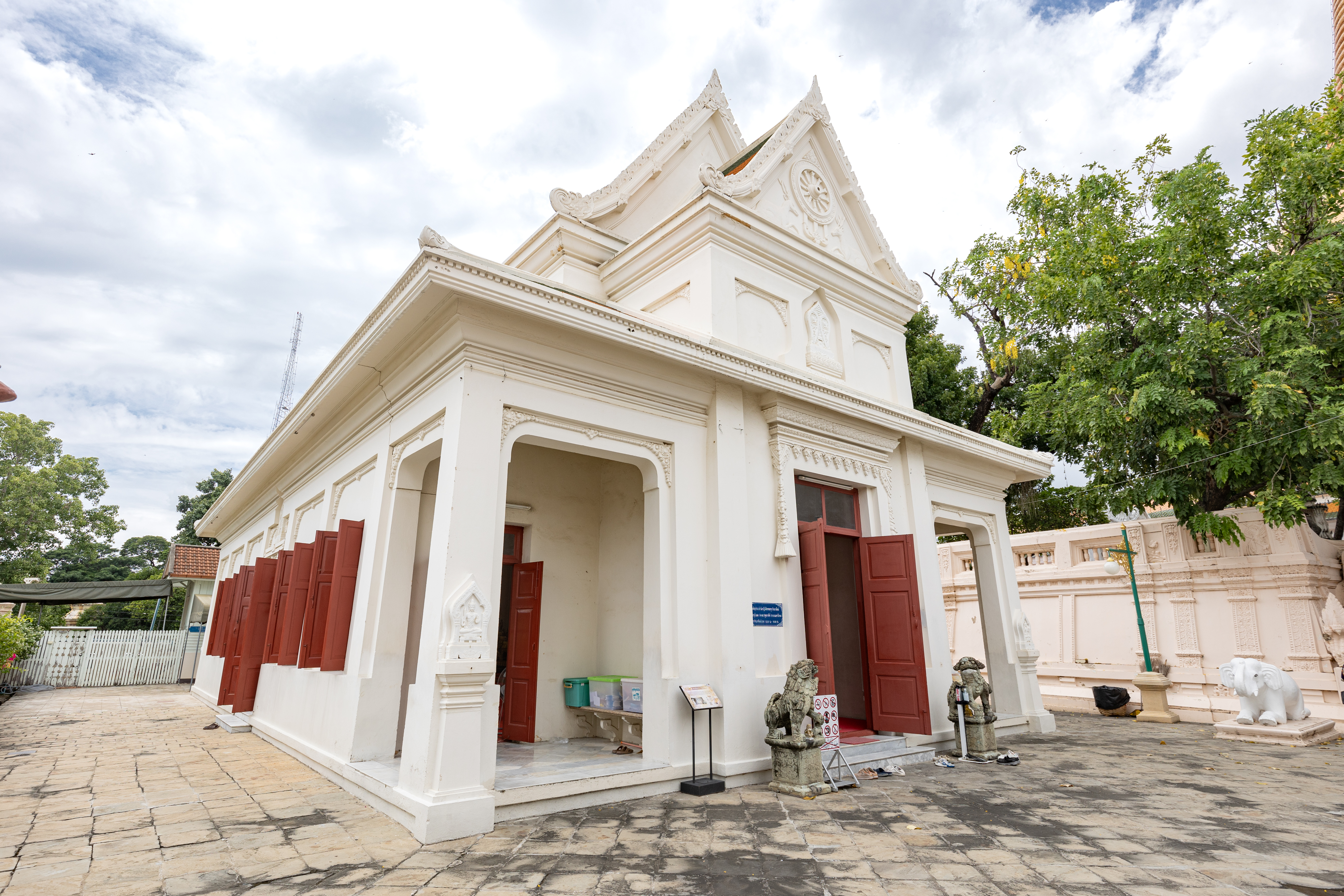

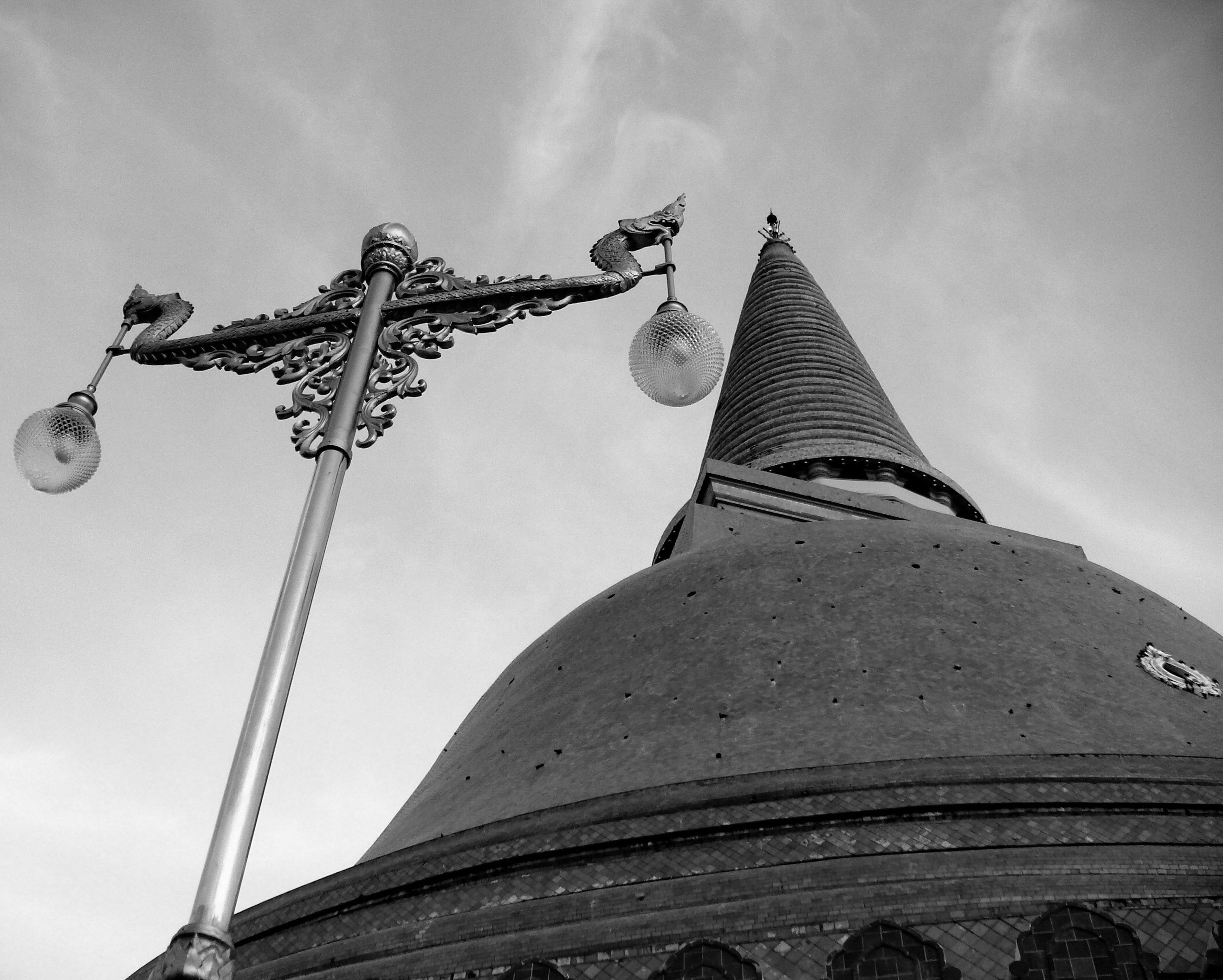

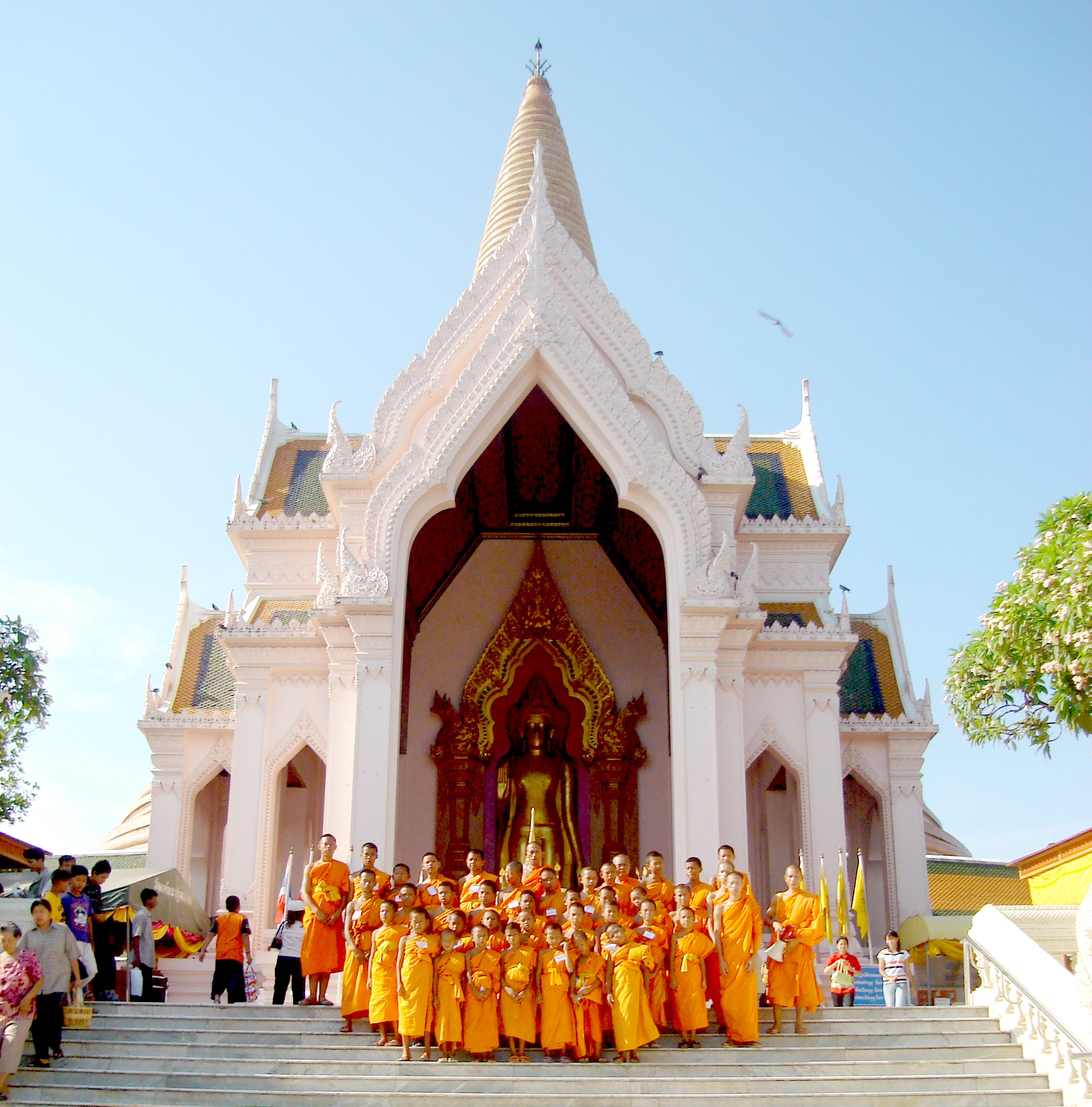

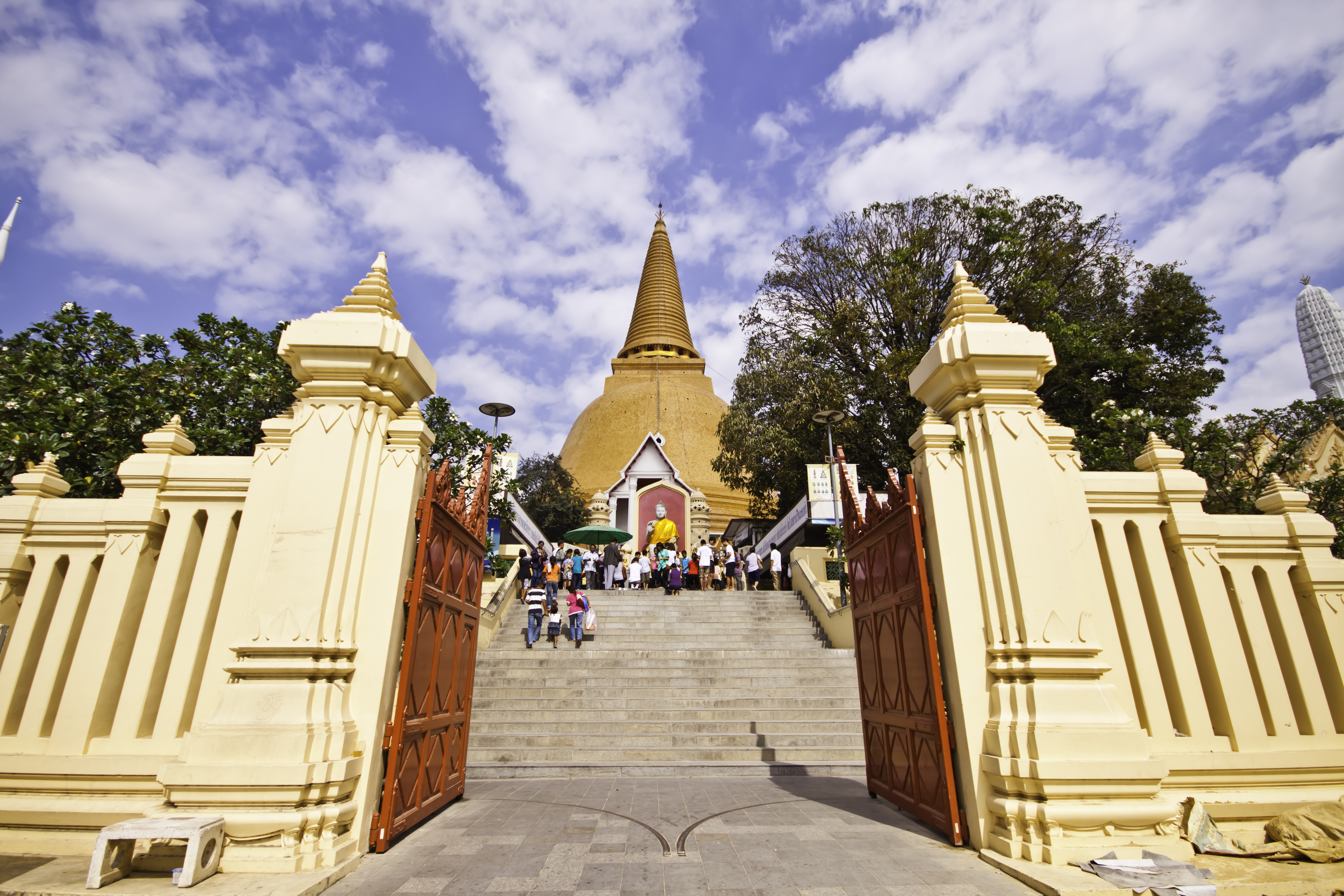

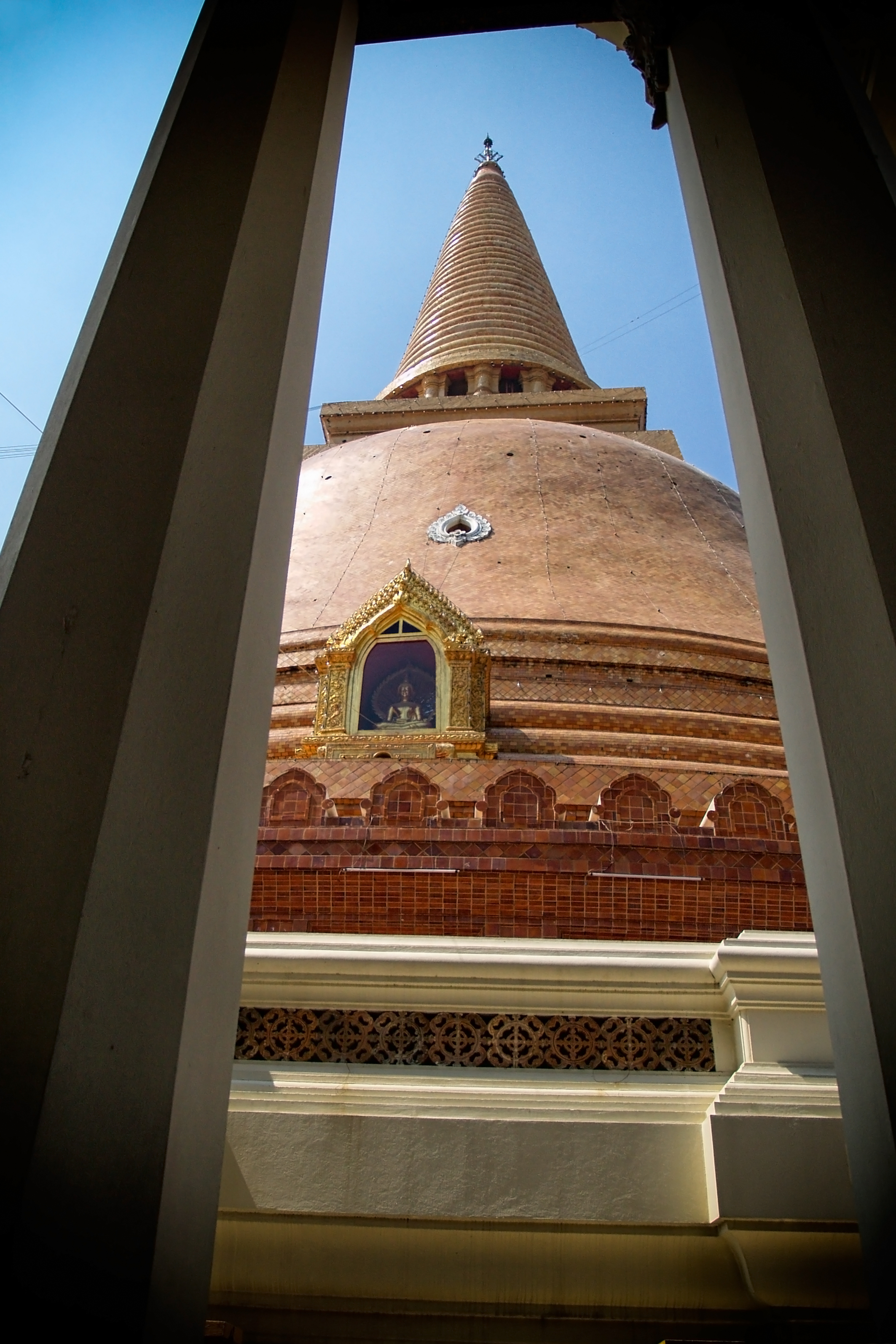

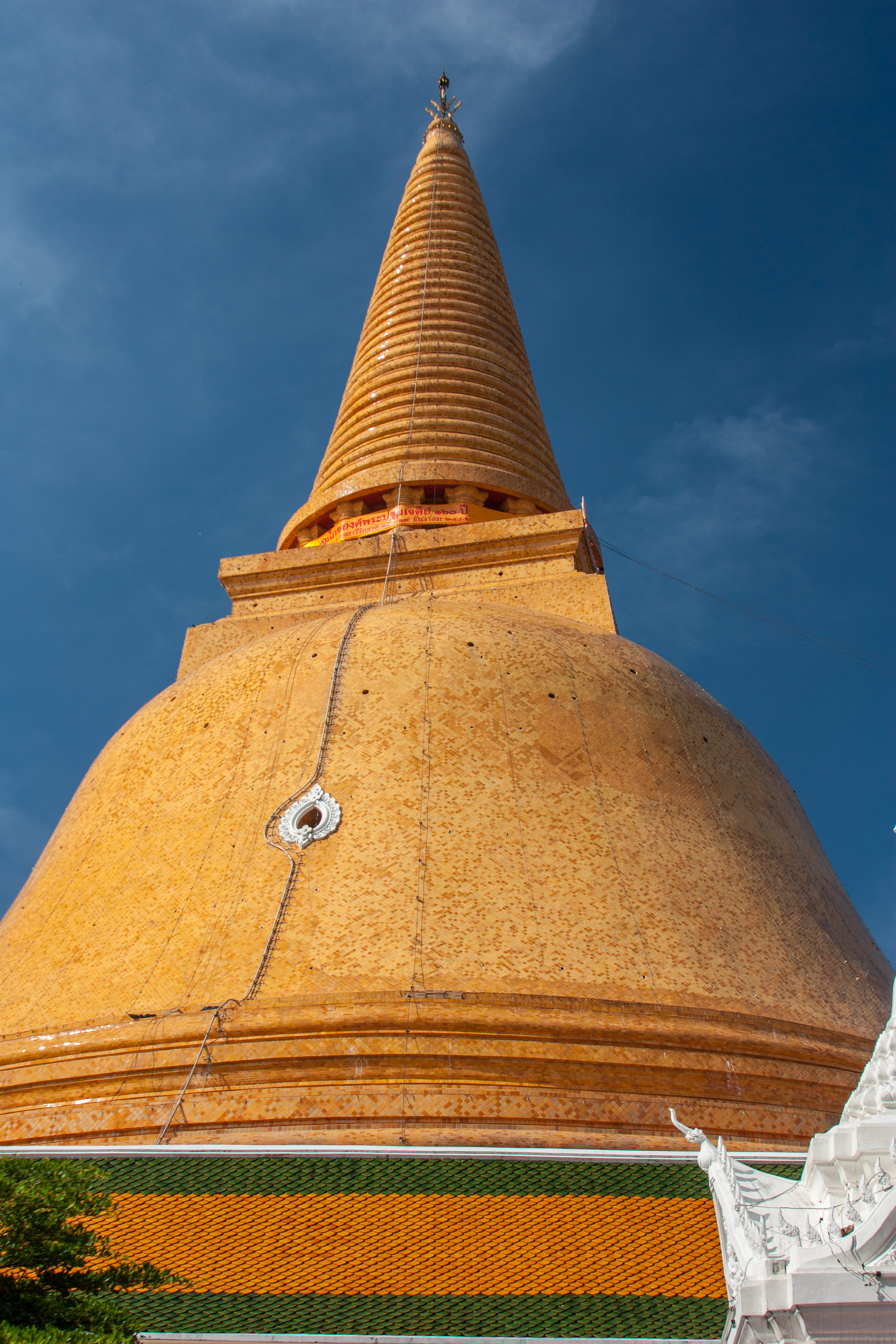

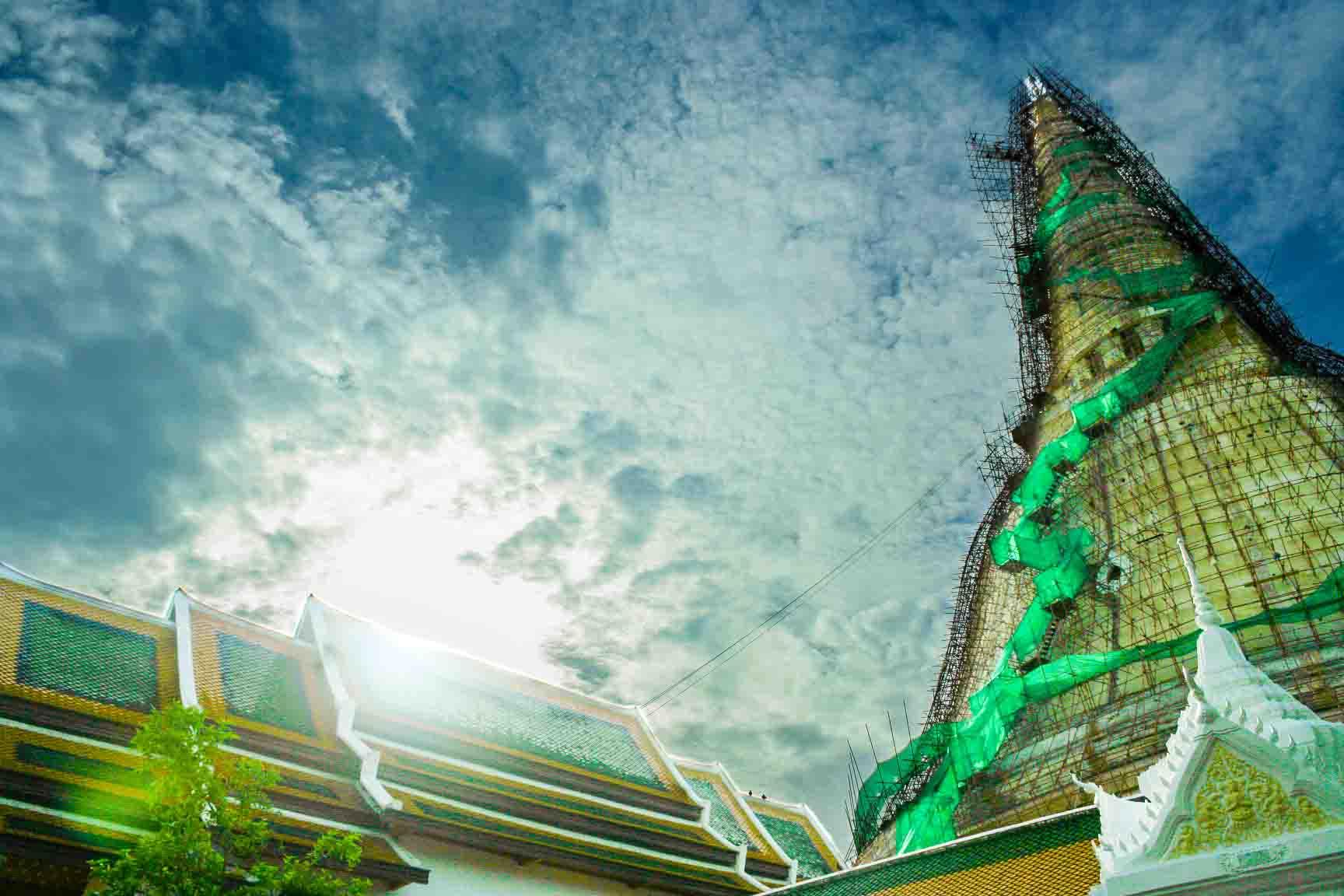

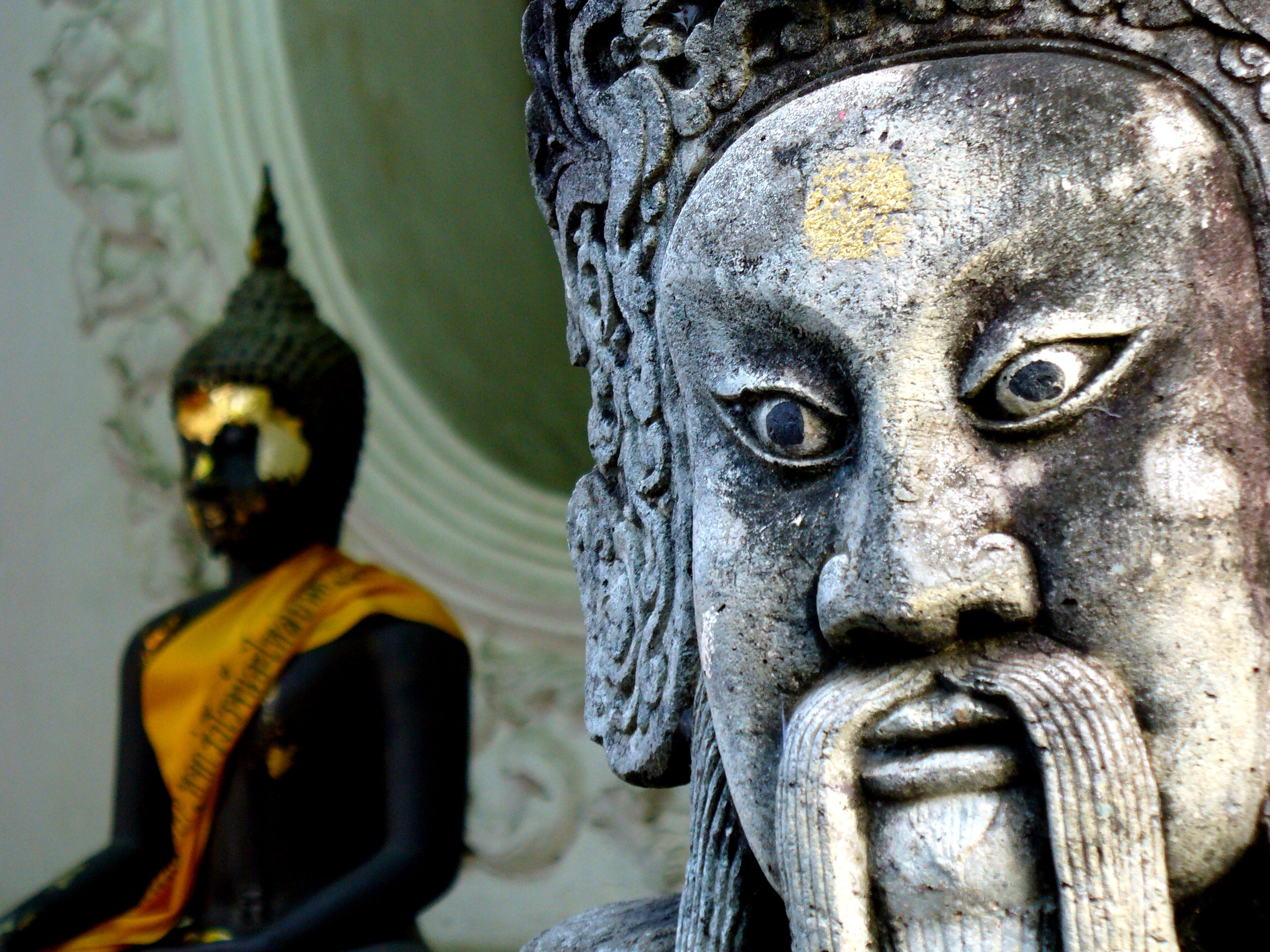

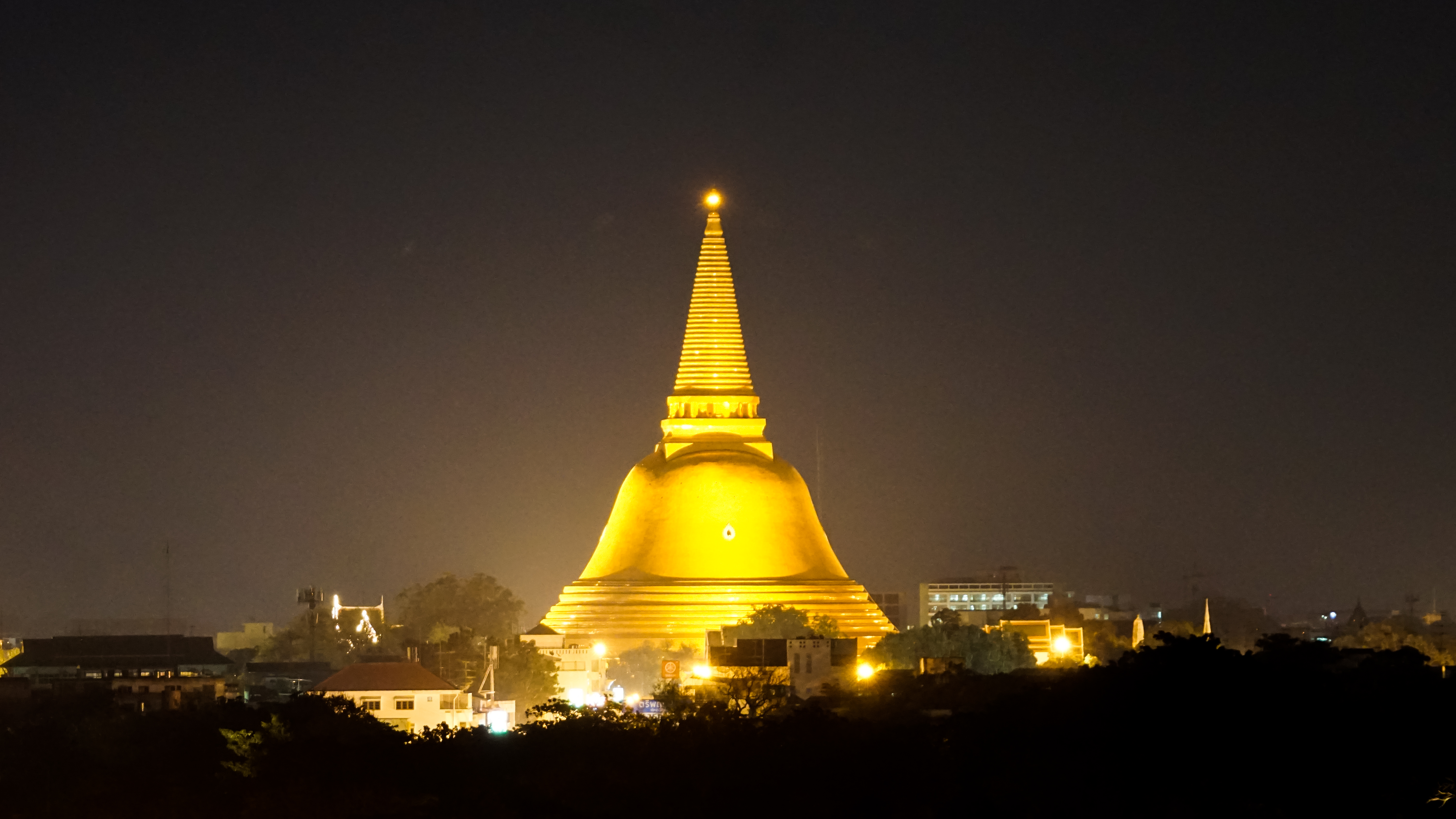

== See also ==
- List of Buddhist temples in Thailand
- List of tallest structures built before the 20th century

== Bibliography ==
- Chihara, Daigoro (1996). Jan Fontein (ed.). "Hindu–Buddhist Architecture". Studies in Asian Art and Archaeology. XIX. Leiden: E.J. Brill. ISBN 90-04-10512-3.

== See also ==
- Phra Pathonnachedi
- Sanam Chandra Palace
- Dvaravati
- Nakhon Pathom
