= Phra Prathon Chedi =

Coordinates: 13°48′53″N 100°5′49″E

Phra Prathon Chedi พระประโทณเจดีย์
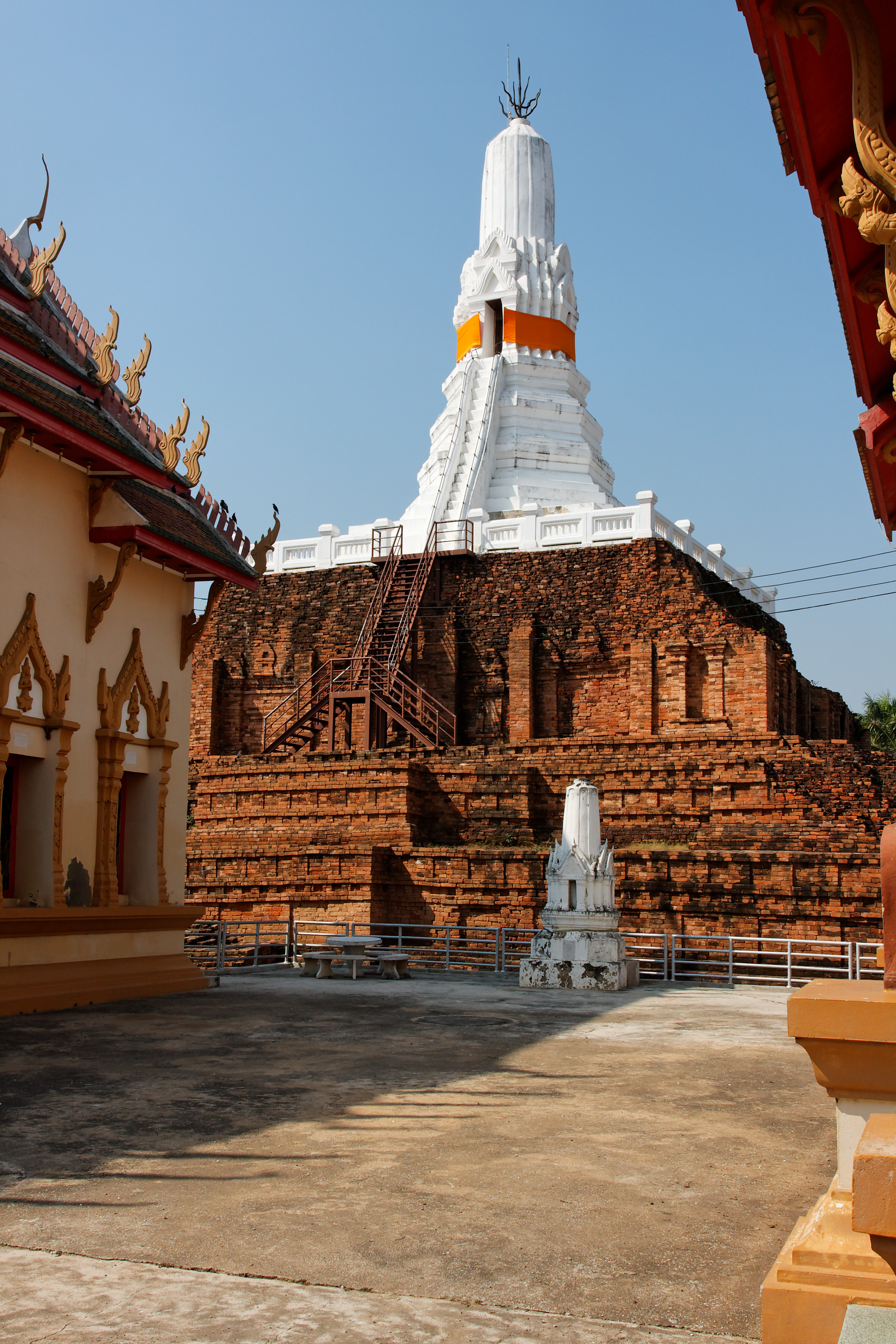
- Phra Prathon Chedi
- Interactive map of the Phra Prathon Chedi พระประโทณเจดีย์ area

General information
- Architectural style: stupa
- Location: Nakhon Pathom, Thailand
- Construction started: 656 CE

Phra Prathon Chedi (Thai: พระประโทณเจดีย์, pronounced [pʰráʔ prā.tʰōːn t͡ɕēː.dīː]) is one of the oldest stupas in Thailand with the height of 50 metres (164 ft). The stupa is located in the Wat Phra Prathon Chedi Wora Viharn (Thai: วัดพระประโทณเจดีย์วรวิหาร), a temple in Nakhon Pathom, Thailand, 3 km east of Phra Pathommachedi.

The name Phra Prathon Chedi means the holy stupa of Thona or Thanan (Thai: ทะนาน), name of an ancient measurement. According to legend after the cremation of Gautama Buddha, his relics were equally divided amongst 8 royal families and his disciples by using a golden Thona. This golden Thona eventually sent to ancient Nakhon Chai Si in Suvarnabhumi and kept inside a stone stupa in 590. King of Sri Lanka wanted the golden Thona, so he sent a prominent monk to ask the golden Thona from the King of Nakhon Chai Si. The king agreed in exchange of one Thona of holy relics of Buddha and built a new stupa to keep the holy relics, which is Phra Pathommachedi. In 656 King of Lavo ruled Nakhon Chai Si and rebuilt the stupa and named Phra Prathon Chedi.

== History ==
=== Dvaravati Period ===
The original of Phra Prathon Chedi has no historical record, but according to archaeological survey findings date back to the 4th century. Modern Historians believe that the stupa was the principal stupas of ancient Nakhon Pathom, the largest settlement of Dvaravati culture together with the nearby Phra Pathommachedi (Thai: พระปฐมเจดีย์) during the 6th to the 8th centuries. Before excavation, archaeologists believed that the original structure of Phra Prathon Chedi was similar with the Great Stupa in Sanchi, India, with a simple hemispherical brick structure built over the relics of the Buddha with chatra, a parasol-like structure symbolising high rank, on the top of stupa. After excavation, the stupa was built in Dvaravati style with multi-tiers brick square shape stupa, similar with Borobudur in Indonesia, but in much smaller scale.

=== Legend of Phaya Gong and Phaya Phan ===
Since the origin of Phra Prathon Chedi is unknown, there are many legends about the stupa construction. The most famous legend is the legend of Phraya Gong and Phraya Phan[6] (Thai: ตำนานพระยากงพระยาพาน). The story is about a king of Nakhon Chai Si, Phraya Gong, had a baby boy, Phan, but the court astrologer predicted that Phan will commit fratricide in the future. Phraya Gong then abandoned Phan. The orphan baby had been unknowingly adopted by childless Granny Hom. Granny Hom raised Phan in Ratchaburi, a vassal city state of Nakhon Chai Si. One day an elephant of the local lord was in rut and attacked people. Phan went to see the elephant and was able to subdue it. After Ratchaburi lord heard about heroic act of Phan, the lord adopted Phan as his son. Phan wanted to conquer Nakhon Chai Si of Phraya Gong, so he sent a letter to Phraya Gong for war elephant duel battle. Phan killed Phraya Gong, and demand Phraya Gong's wife to become his queen according to ancient custom. When the queen met Phan, she recognized him to be her son, and told him the truth. Shocked Phan, now became king and named Phraya Phan, executed old Granny Hom for not reveal the truth before he killed his father. After realised that he did a great sin by killing both father and a person who raised him, Granny Hom, in the year 26 BCE Phraya Phan consulted with a group of arhats how to atone for his sin. The arhats recommended Phraya Phan to build a great stupa at great height that even the birds can not fly over. Phraya Phan then built Phra Pathommachedi for his father and Phra Prathon Chedi for Granny Hom.

=== Khmer Empire and Bagan Invasion ===
After the Khmer Empire annexed Dvaravati settlements including ancient Nakhon Pathom, in the 11th century, the stupa had been modified with a Khmer style temple on the top of stupa. Anawrahta of the Bagan Kingdom invaded and plundered ancient Nakhon Pathom. Then the city and the stupa had been abandoned and later overgrown by the jungle.

=== Later Development ===
King Mongkut ordered the restoration of Phra Prathon Chedi. He also built Khmer style prang on the top of the stupa, as he believed the design of Phra Prathon Chedi was the same with Phra Pathommachedi. Also under his reign the Phra Prathon Chedi Temple also had a major renovation. Vajiravudh started excavation on Phra Prathon Chedi Temple ground, and found many historic artefacts. Phra Prathon Chedi has been registered as a national heritage site in 1931. However in 1962 after long neglect Phra Prathon Chedi partially collapsed, due to the lack of budget or any help from the central Thai government, the abbot of Phra Prathon Chedi Temple restored the stupa to prevent any further collapse. In 1999 Phra Prathon Chedi has been restored to its Dvaravati form for the first time by the Department of Fine Arts.

== Gallery ==
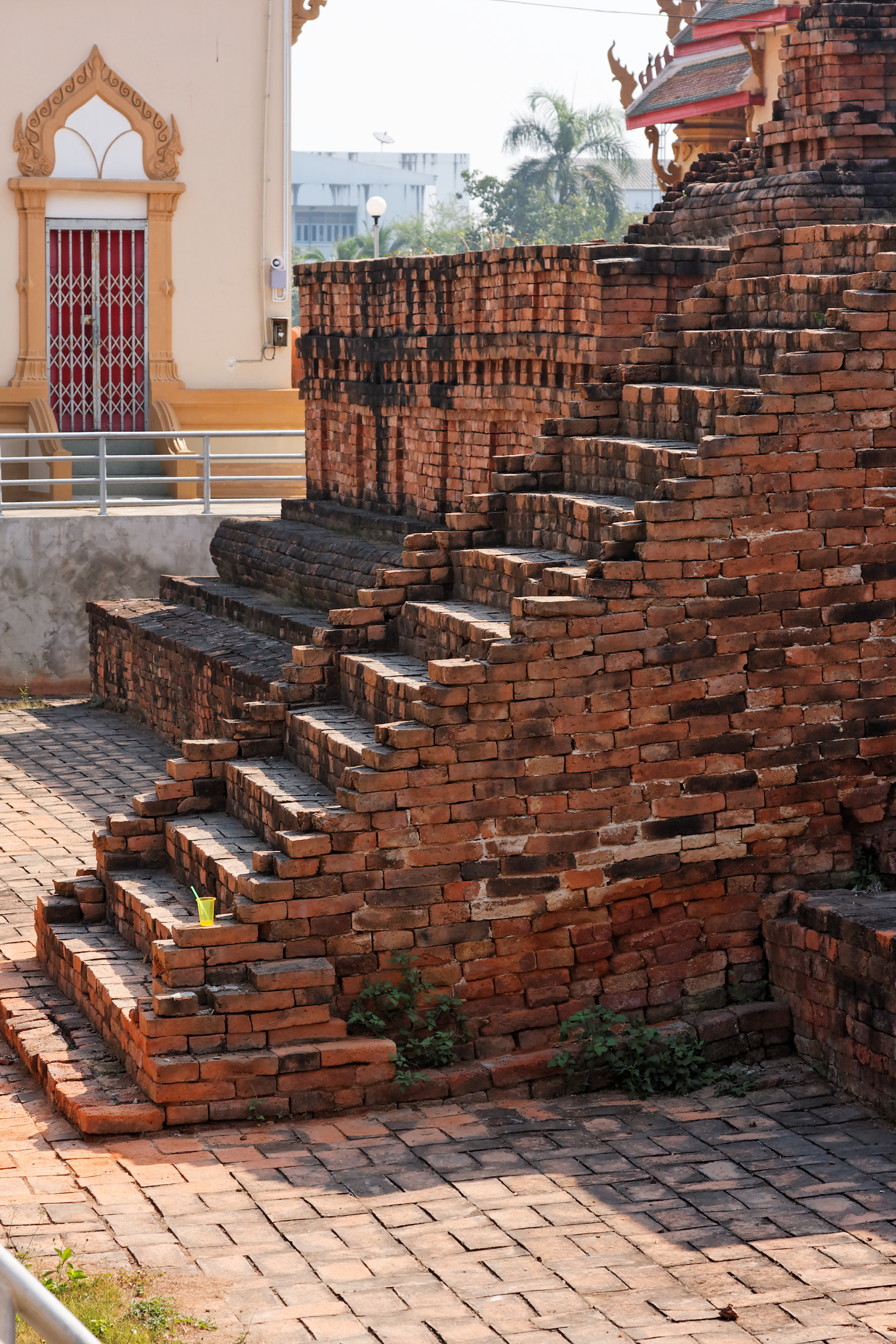

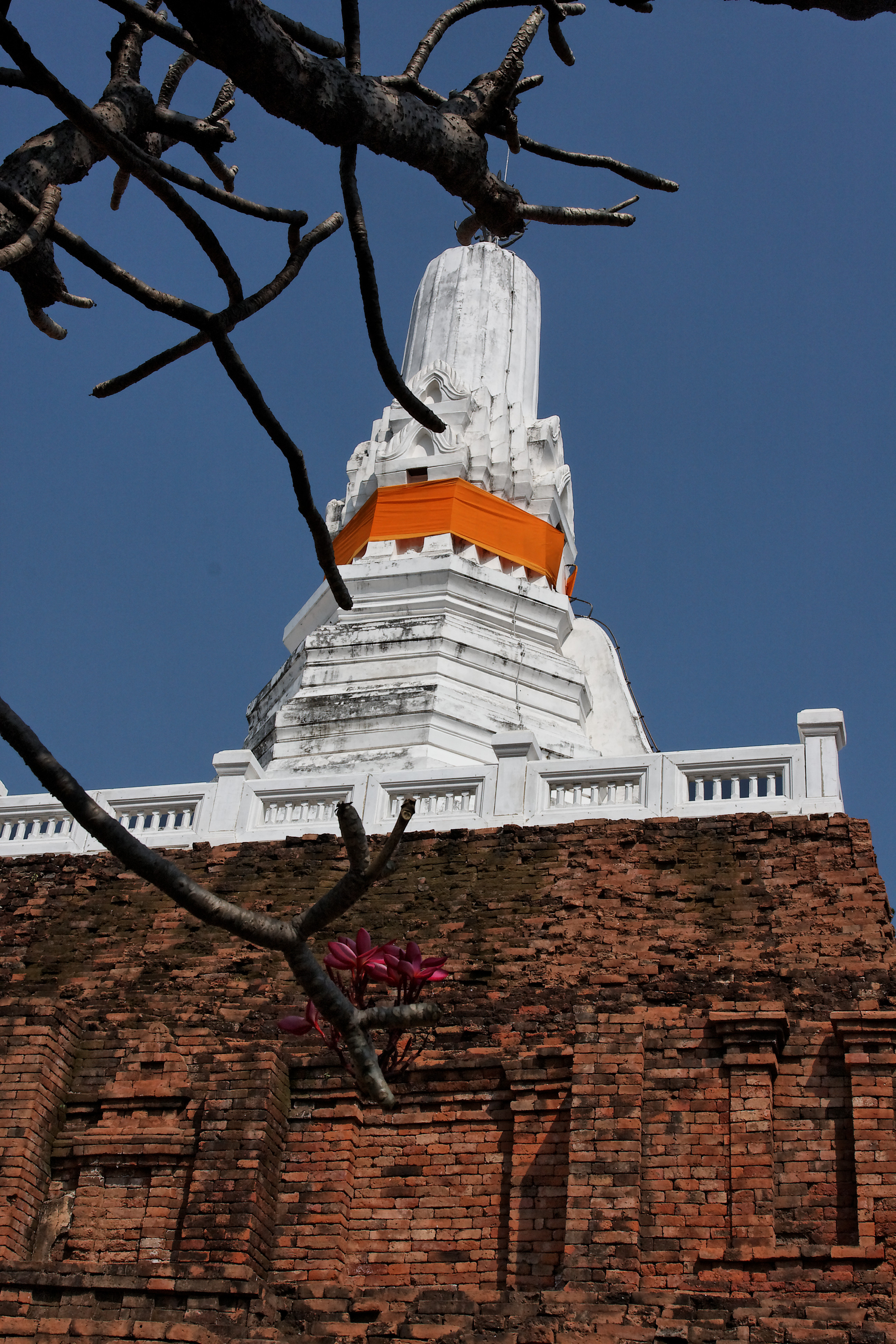

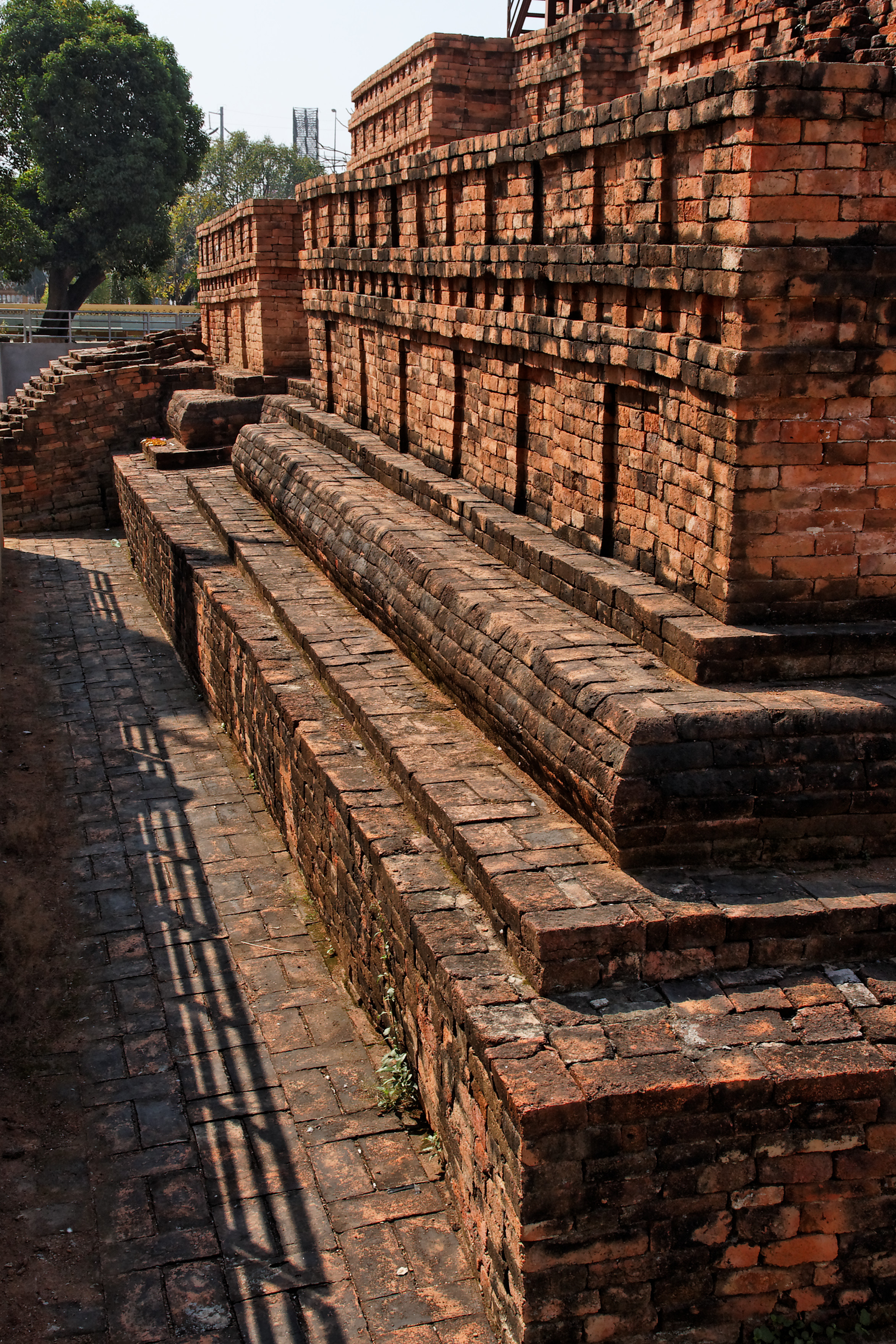

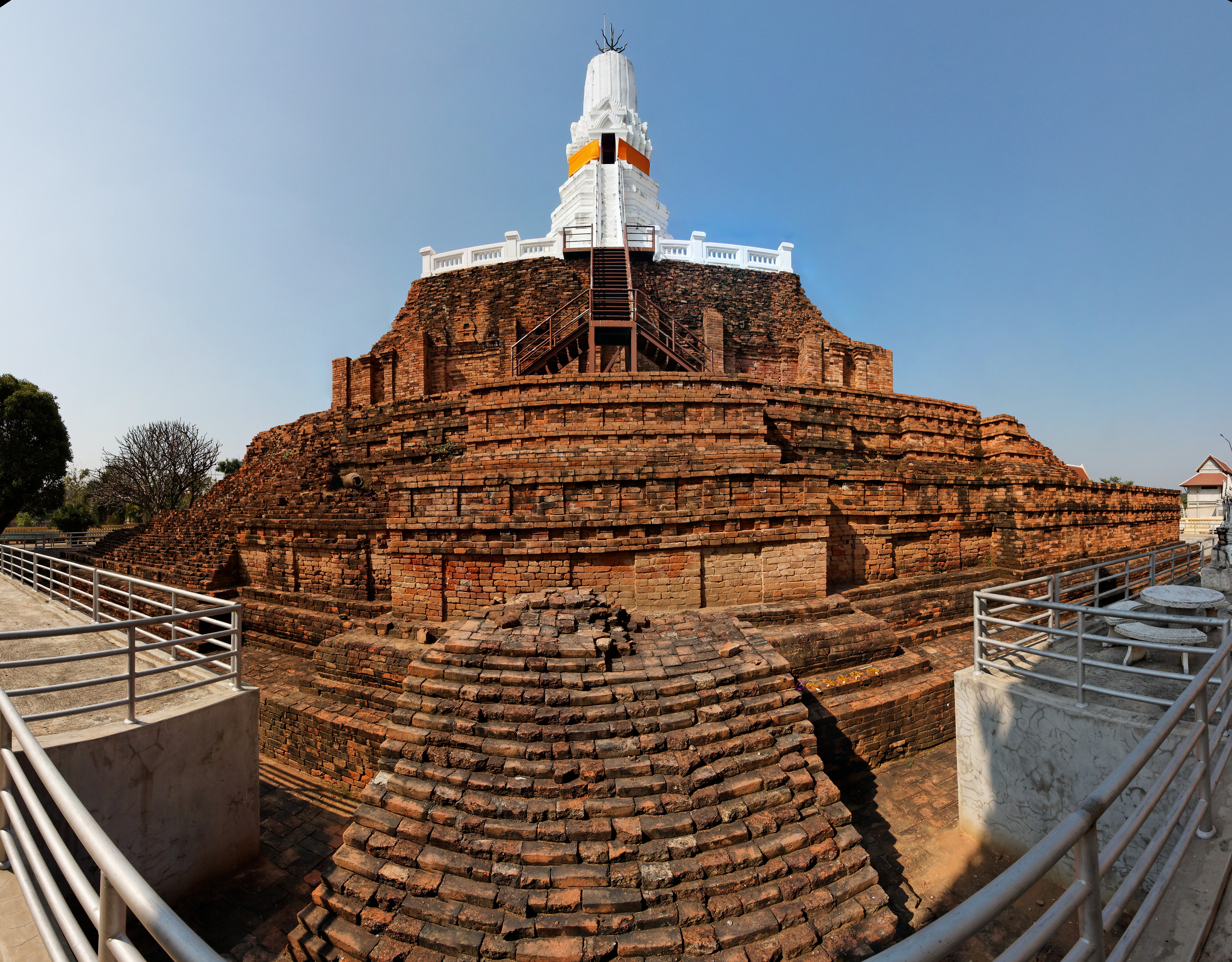

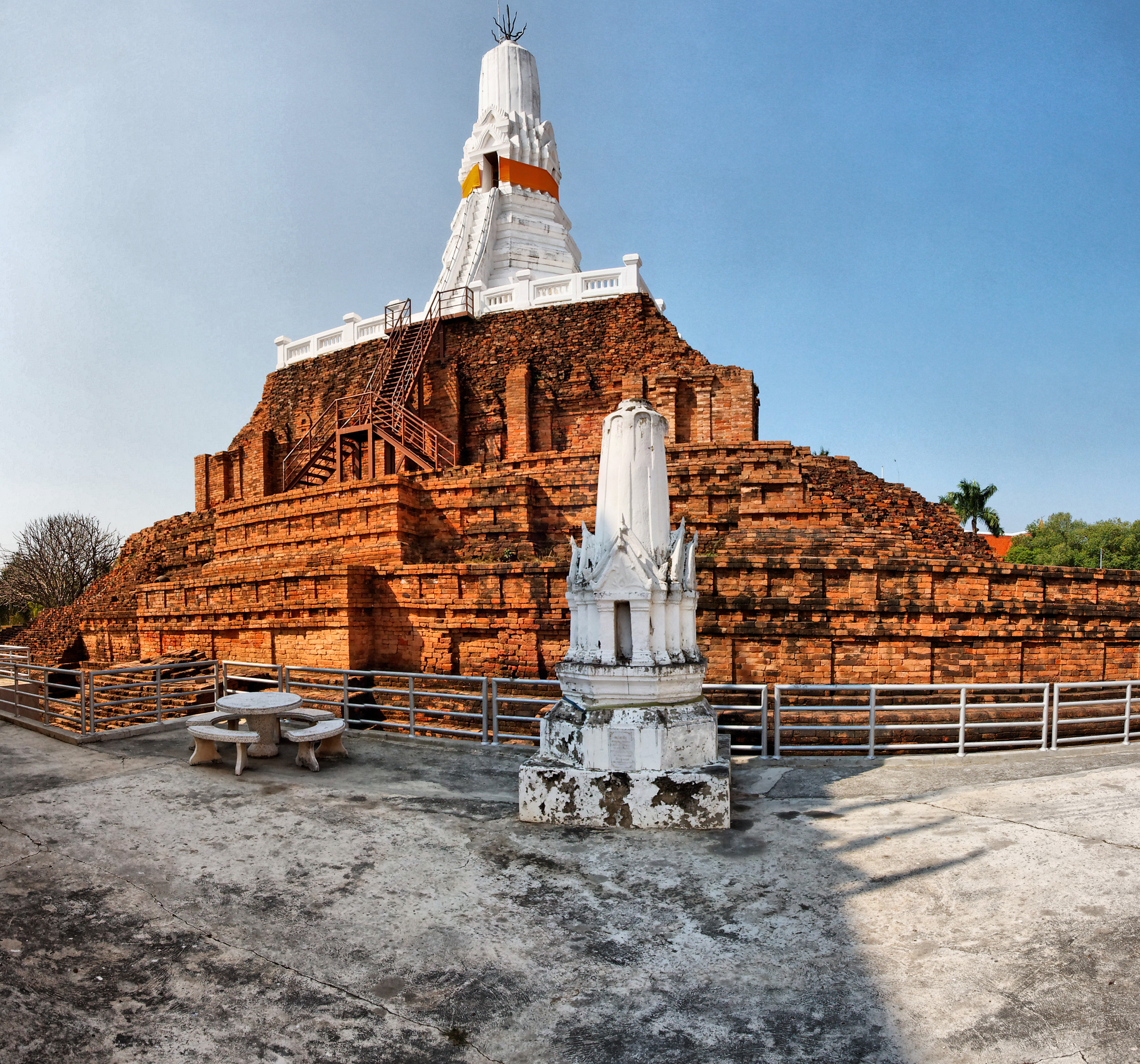

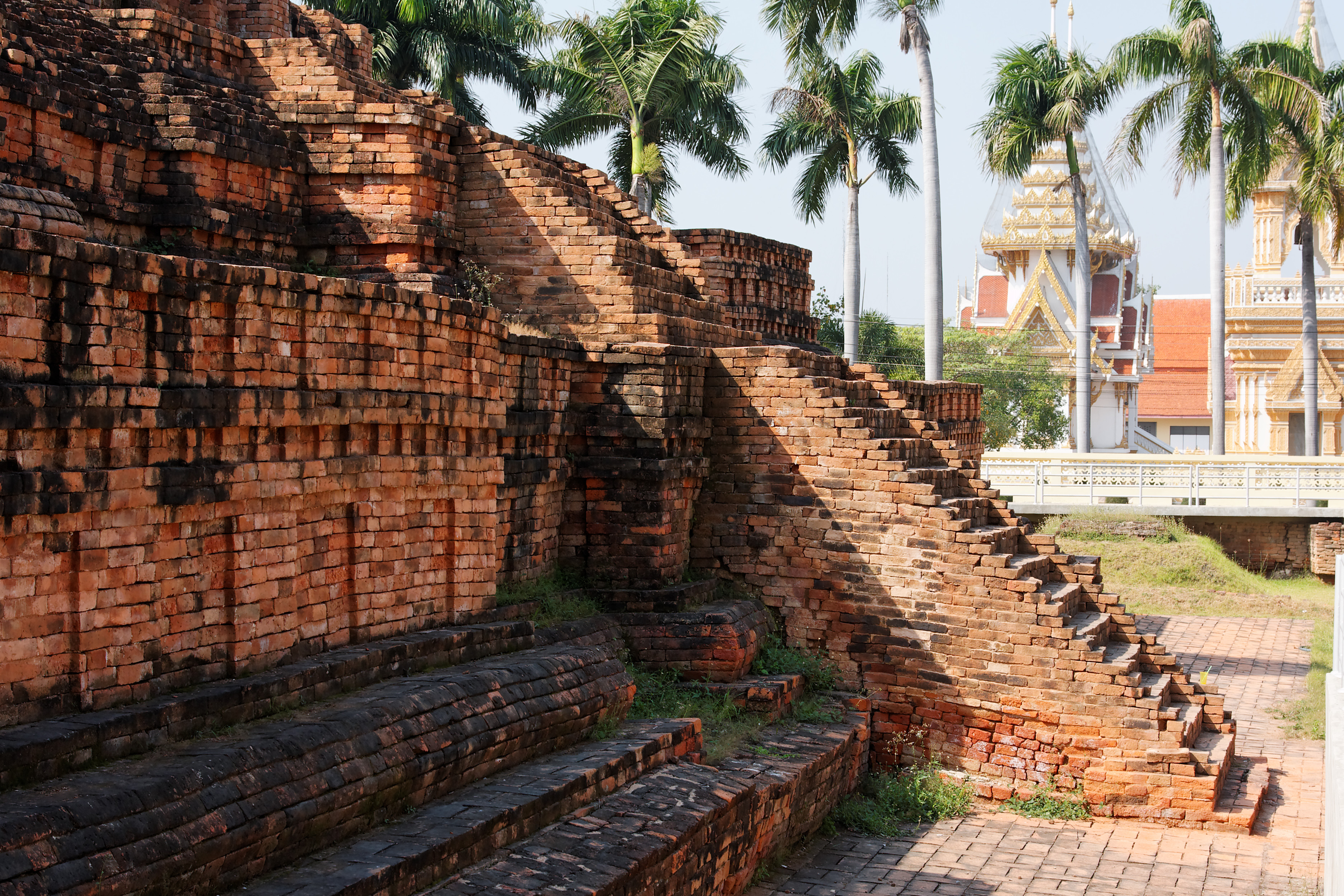

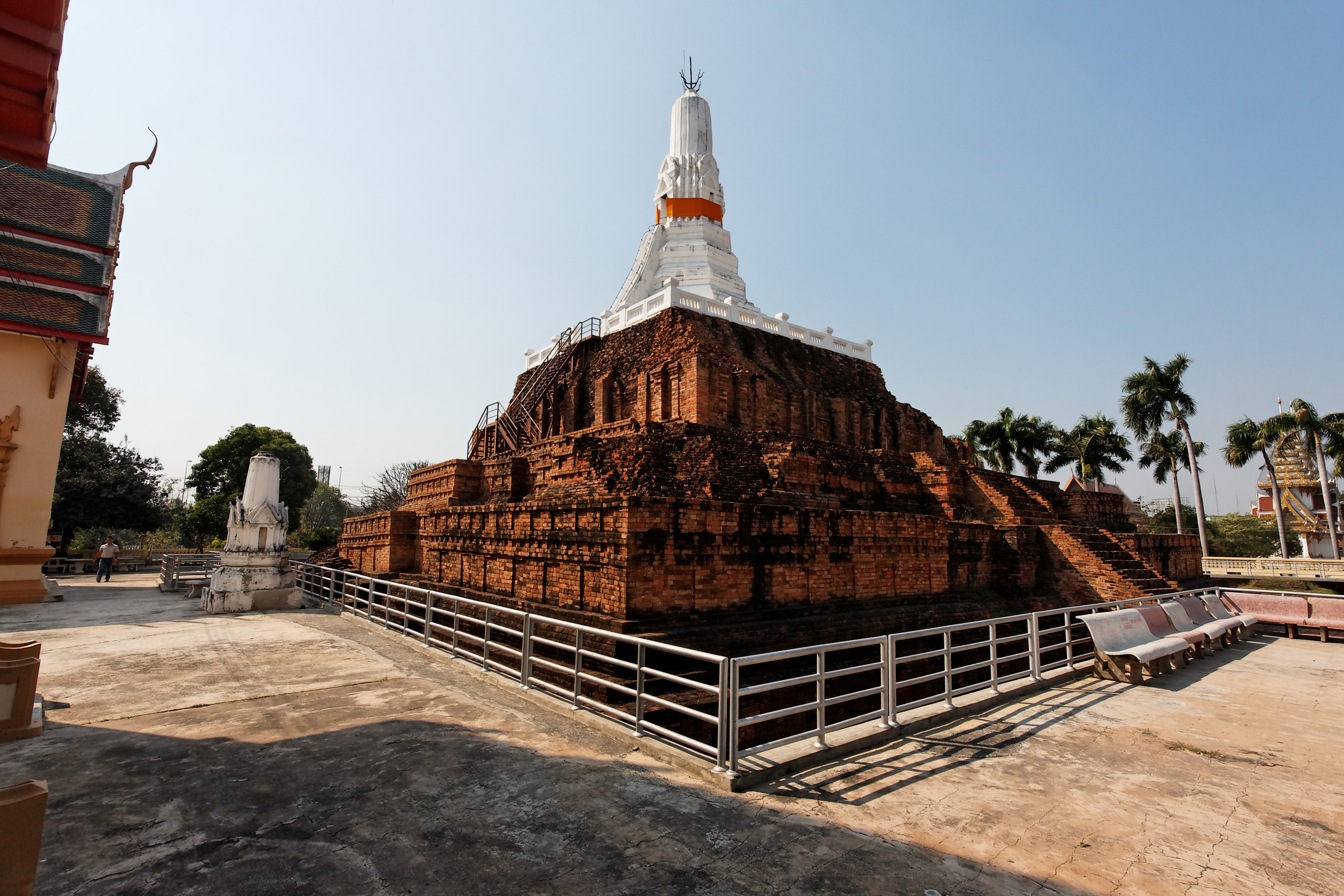
