= Maha Sawat, Nakhon Pathom =

Maha Sawat Subdistrict ตำบลมหาสวัสดิ์
- Subdistrict
- Interactive map of Maha Sawat Subdistrict
- Coordinates: 13°48′28.0″N 100°16′24.2″E
- Country: Thailand
- Province: Nakhon Pathom
- District: Phutthamonthon
- Named for: Khlong Maha Sawat

Area
  - Total: 12.97 km^{2} (5.01 sq mi)

Population (2020)
  - Total: 9,984
  - Density: 769.78/km^{2} (1,993.7/sq mi)
- Time zone: UTC+7 (ICT)
- Postal code: 73170
- TIS 1099: 730703
- Website: https://www.mahasawat.go.th/index.php

Maha Sawat (Thai: มหาสวัสดิ์, pronounced [mā.hǎː sā.wàt]) is one of three subdistricts (tambon) of Phutthamonthon district, Nakhon Pathom province, central Thailand.

== History ==
The subdistrict is named after the canal (khlong) flows through it, "Khlong Maha Sawat" (Note: Some say it comes from the name of a local man "Sawat". He was ordained as a monk and studied Dharma until he was named "Maha (the great) Sawat". When he died, hence named the subdistrict in his honour.). A 28 km (17.4 mi) long canal dug during the King Rama IV's reign bridging Khlong Bangkok Noi in Bangkok and the Tha Chin river in Nakhon Pathom province. Throughout the canal, there are 7 pavilions (sala) on both sides, about 4 km (2.5 mi) apart.

These various pavilions (not even the remains of the present) have different uses. Their names have become the names of places such as Sala Ya and Sala Thammasop. The last pavilion was the "Sala Din" (used for burial of workers who died during the canal digging). It is now the name of a village (muban) in the subdistrict.

Khlong Maha Sawat and Sala Din is currently another important cultural and agritourism destination of Nakhon Pathom and the outskirts of Bangkok.

== Geography ==
Its adjoining subdistricts, clockwise from the north, are Lan Tak Fa in Nakhon Chai Si district and Khlong Yong in its district, Sala Ya in its district, Bang Toei, Song Khanong, Hom Kret in Sam Phran district, Thaiyawat, Ngio Rai and Lan Tak Fa in Nakhon Chai Si district, respectively.

== Administration ==
=== Central administration ===
The entire subdistrict area is administered by the Maha Sawat Subdistrict Administrative Organization (องค์การบริหารส่วนตำบลมหาสวัสดิ์).

=== Local administration ===
Maha Sawat is divided into 4 administrative villages:

No.	Name	Thai
1.	Ban Sala Nok Krachok	บ้านศาลานกกระจอก
2.	Ban Khlong Maha Sawat	บ้านคลองมหาสวัสดิ์
3.	Ban Sala Din	บ้านศาลาดิน
4.	Ban Khlong Yong	บ้านคลองโยง
