= Taling Chan (disambiguation) =

Taling Chan may refer to:

- Taling Chan District in Bangkok, Thailand
  - Taling Chan Subdistrict, Bangkok, within the district
- Taling Chan Subdistrict in Nuea Khlong District, Krabi
- Taling Chan Subdistrict in Tha Sala District, Nakhon Si Thammarat
- Taling Chan Subdistrict in Bang Pa-in District, Phra Nakhon Si Ayutthaya
- Taling Chan Subdistrict in Bannang Sata District, Yala
- Taling Chan Subdistrict in Chana District, Songkhla
- Taling Chan Subdistrict, Saraburi, in Mueang Saraburi District
- Taling Chan Subdistrict in Ban Dan Lan Hoi District, Sukhothai
- Taling Chan Subdistrict in Mueang Suphan Buri District
