= Thai Film Archive =

Film archive in Thailand

Film Archive (Public Organization)
- หอภาพยนตร์ (องค์การมหาชน)
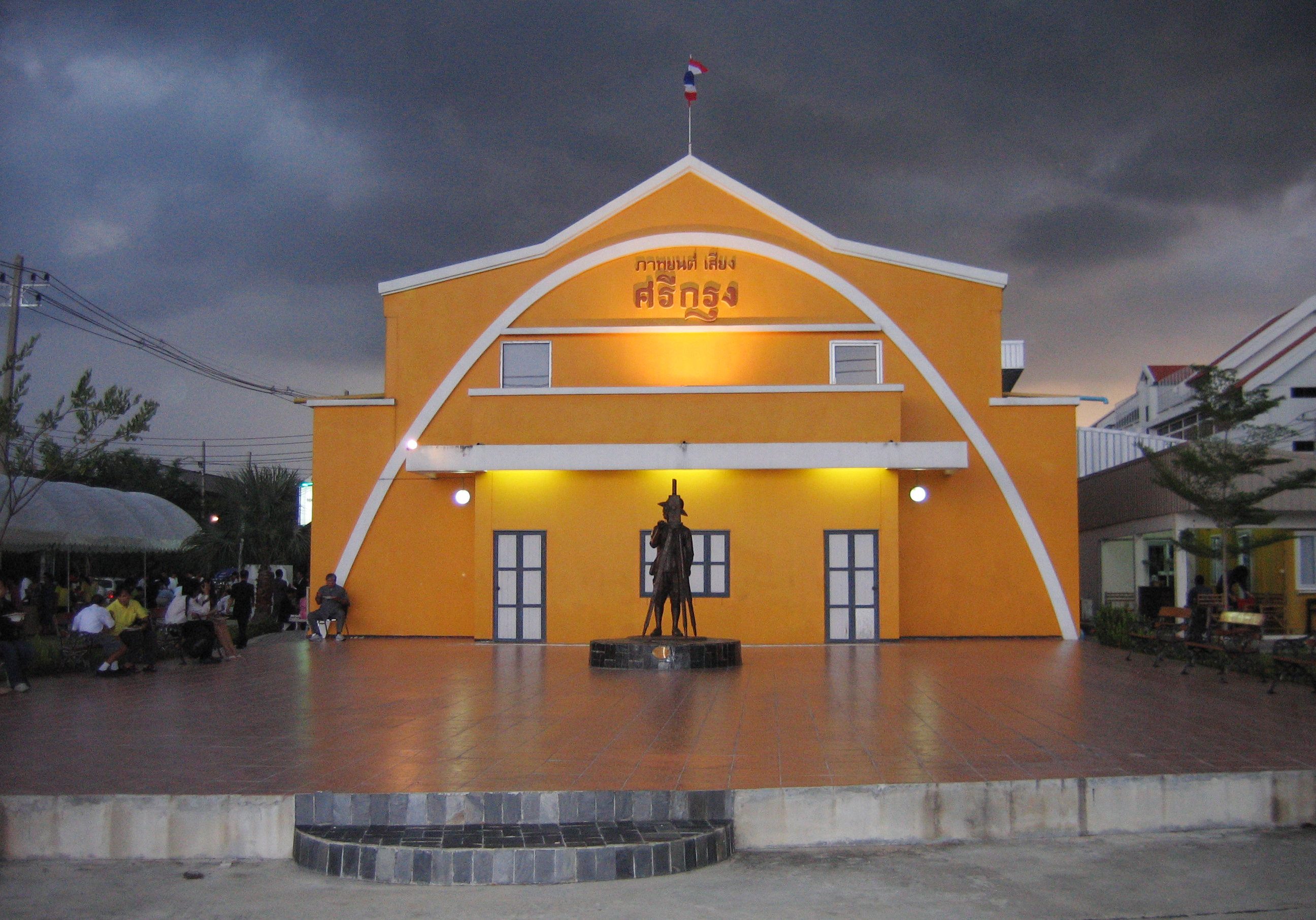
- National Film Archive in 2008

Agency overview
- Formed: 2009
- Preceding agency: National Film Archive
- Type: Public organization
- Headquarters: Salaya, Phutthamonthon, Nakhon Pathom, Thailand; 13.7989°N 100.3030°E
- Agency executive: Chalida Uabumrungjit, Director
- Website: Official website

The Film Archive (Public Organization) (FA; Thai: หอภาพยนตร์ (องค์การมหาชน)), also commonly referred to as the Thai Film Archive (TFA), is a film archive in Thailand. It was established in 1984 as the National Film Archive, operating under the Fine Arts Department. It was reorganized into a public organization under the oversight of the Ministry of Culture in 2009. It is located in the Phutthamonthon District of Nakhon Pathom Province.

== See also ==
- National Film Heritage Registry
- List of film archives
