= Salaya railway station =

Railway station in Salaya, Thailand

Coordinates: 13.8026°N 100.3243°E

Salaya ศาลายา
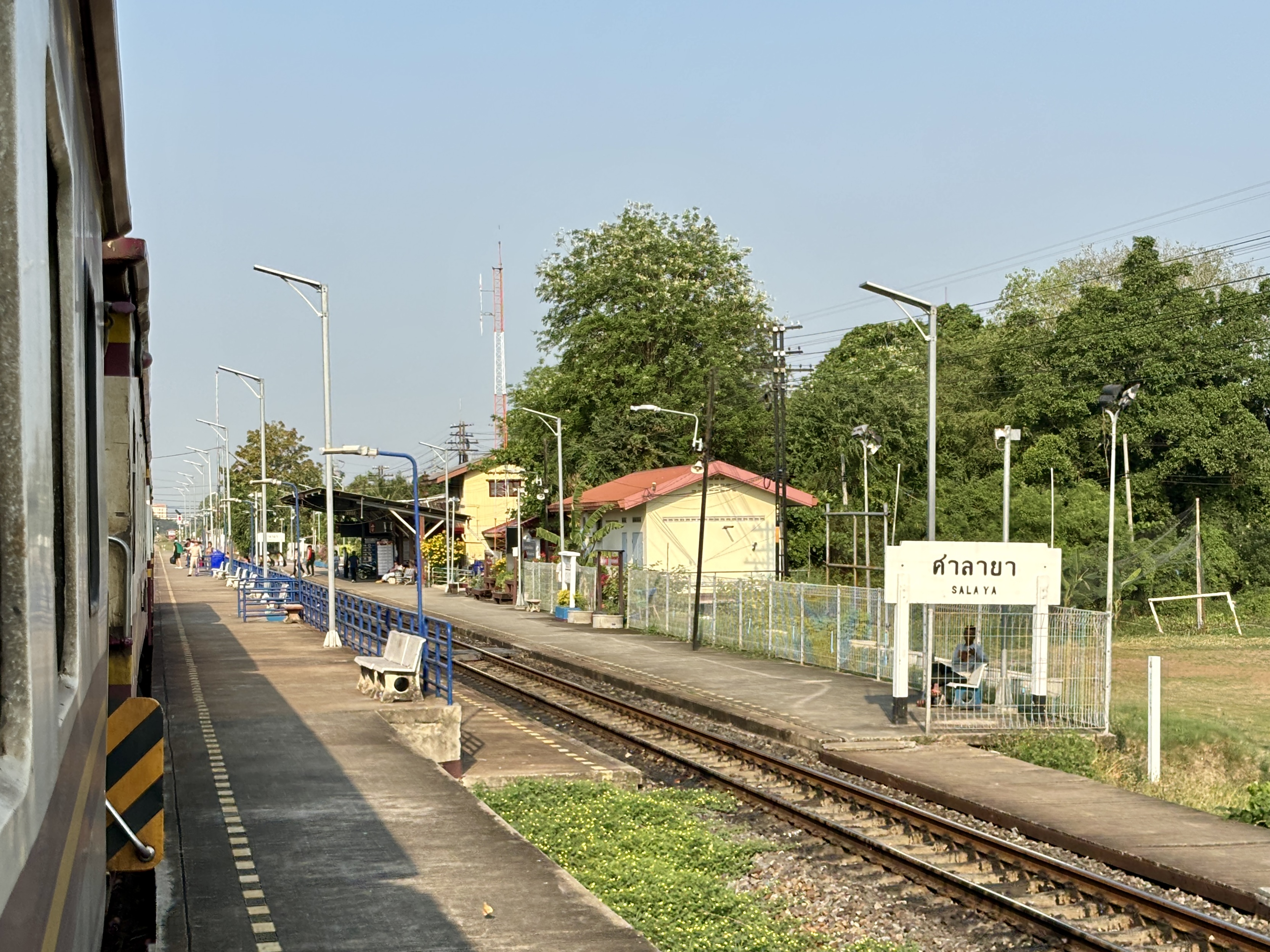

General information
- Location: Phutthamonthon Sai 4 Road, Salaya Subdistrict, Phutthamonthon District; Nakhon Pathom Province; Thailand
- Operator: State Railway of Thailand
- Manager: Ministry of Transport
- Line: Su-ngai Kolok Main Line
- Platforms: 3
- Tracks: 3
- Connections: Taxi

Construction
- Structure type: At-grade
- Parking: Yes

Other information
- Station code: ลย. 4009
- Classification: Class 1

Services
Preceding station	State Railway of Thailand	Following station
Sala Thammasop towards Hua Lamphong or Krung Thep Aphiwat	Southern Line	Wat Suwan towards Su-ngai Kolok
Location

Salaya railway station is a railway station located in Salaya Subdistrict, Phutthamonthon District, Nakhon Pathom Province and is a class 1 railway station. It is located 19.081 kilometres (11.9 mi) from Thon Buri railway station. Salaya railway station is close to Mahidol University, Mahidol Witthayanusorn School, and Mahidol University International Demonstration School (MUIDS).
