= Taling Chan subdistrict, Bangkok =

Coordinates: 13°47′34.6″N 100°26′55.9″E

Taling Chan ตลิ่งชัน
- Khwaeng
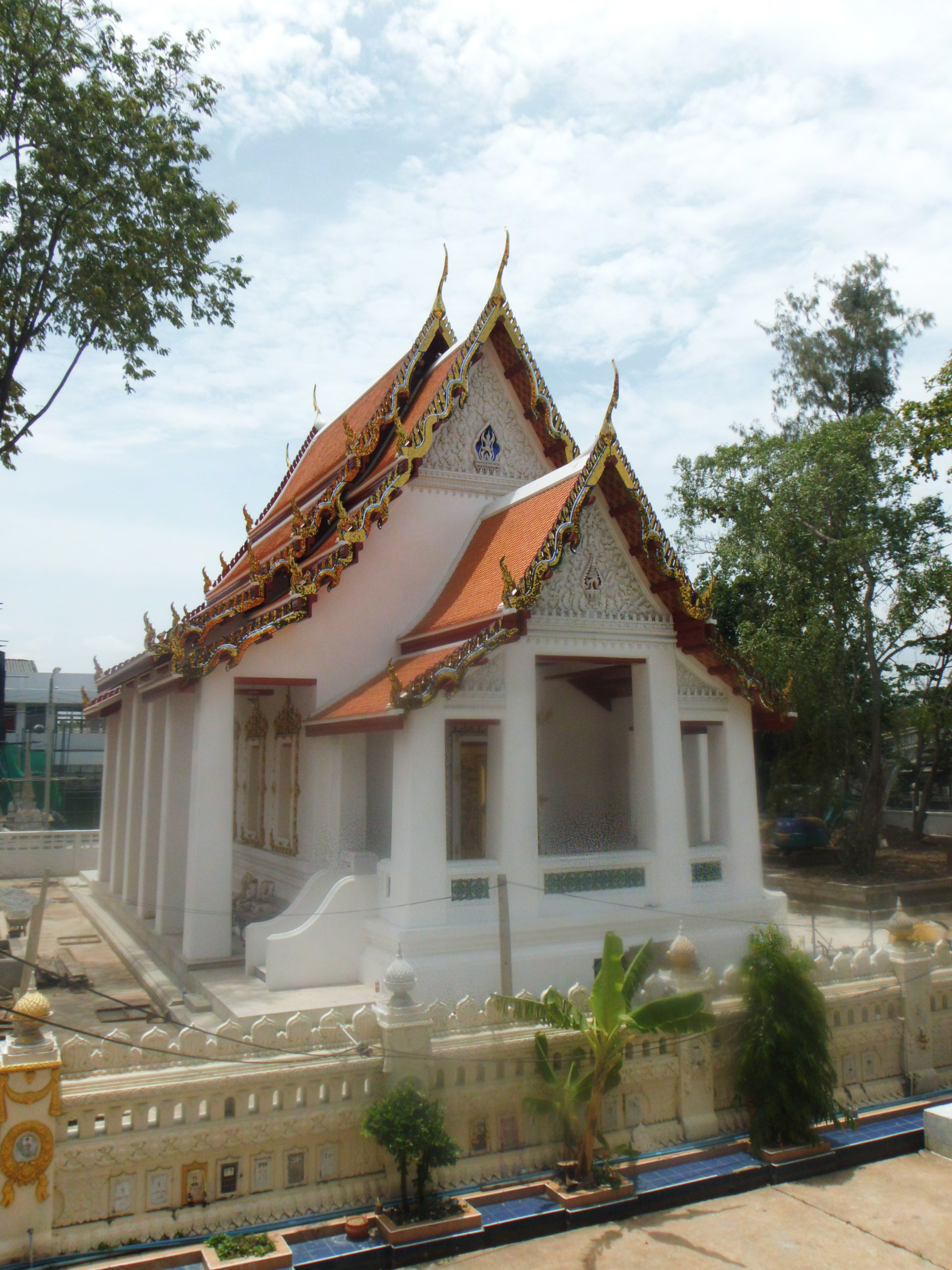
- Wat Chaiyaphrueksamala, the prominent local temple

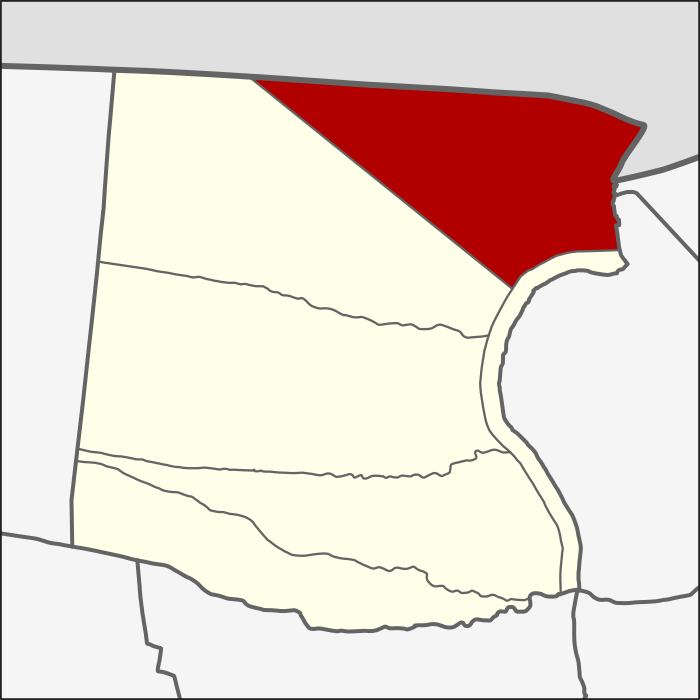
- Location in Taling Chan district
- Country: Thailand
- Province: Bangkok
- Khet: Taling Chan

Area
  - Total: 5.183 km^{2} (2.001 sq mi)

Population (2020)
  - Total: 24,515
  - Density: 4,729.89/km^{2} (12,250.4/sq mi)
- Time zone: UTC+7 (ICT)
- Postal code: 10170
- TIS 1099: 101902

Taling Chan (Thai: ตลิ่งชัน, pronounced [tā.lìŋ t͡ɕʰān]) is a khwaeng (sub-district) in Taling Chan district, Bangkok, Thailand.

== History & toponymy ==
The name Taling Chan means "steep bank," though it is unclear exactly when the name was first used. It is possible that the name originated because of the Khlong Chak Phra canal, the original course of the Chao Phraya river that flows through the area. During the middle Ayutthaya period (corresponding to King Chairachathirat's reign), an excavation was made through a loop of the Chao Phraya river. As a result, the river followed the new canal, causing one bank to be higher than the opposite bank, which was assumed to be the old river course and became a low-lying plain prone to annual flooding.

Taling Chan was formerly part of Thonburi province before Phra Nakhon and Thonburi provinces were merged into Bangkok in late 1972. Since then, Taling Chan has held full sub-district and district status within Bangkok.

== Geography ==
Taling Chan is the northernmost and northeastern part of the district, with total area of 5.381 km^{2} (agricultural area 430.75 rai or 170.25 acres).

The geography of the area is mostly lowland (mostly in the north and east of the area adjacent the canal), therefore often faced with floods every year (during the months from October to November).

Taling Chan is bounded by other sub-districts (from north clockwise): Wat Chalo in Amphoe Bang Kruai of Nonthaburi Province (Khlong Maha Sawat is a borderline), Bang Phlat in Bang Phlat District (Khlong Bangkok Noi is a borderline), Khlong Chak Phra in its district (Chak Phra Road is a borderline), Chim Phli in its district (Southern Railway Line is a borderline), respectively.

== Administration ==
Taling Chan consists of 15 villages (muban).

== Temples ==
There are four Buddhist temples in Taling Chan

- Wat Kai Tia
- Wat Chaiyaphrueksamala
- Wat Nakhon Pa Mak
- Wat Noi Nai

== Transportation ==
Taling Chan can be reached by car via Borommaratchachonnani, Chaiyaphruek, Chak Phra, and Suan Phak Roads, and can also be accessed via Southern Railway, both from Bangkok Railway Station and Bang Sue Grand Station.

Waterways are still the main routes for transporting agricultural products to Pak Khlong Talat.
