= Wat Suwan railway station =

Railway station in Maha Sawat, Thailand

Wat Suwan วัดสุวรรณ
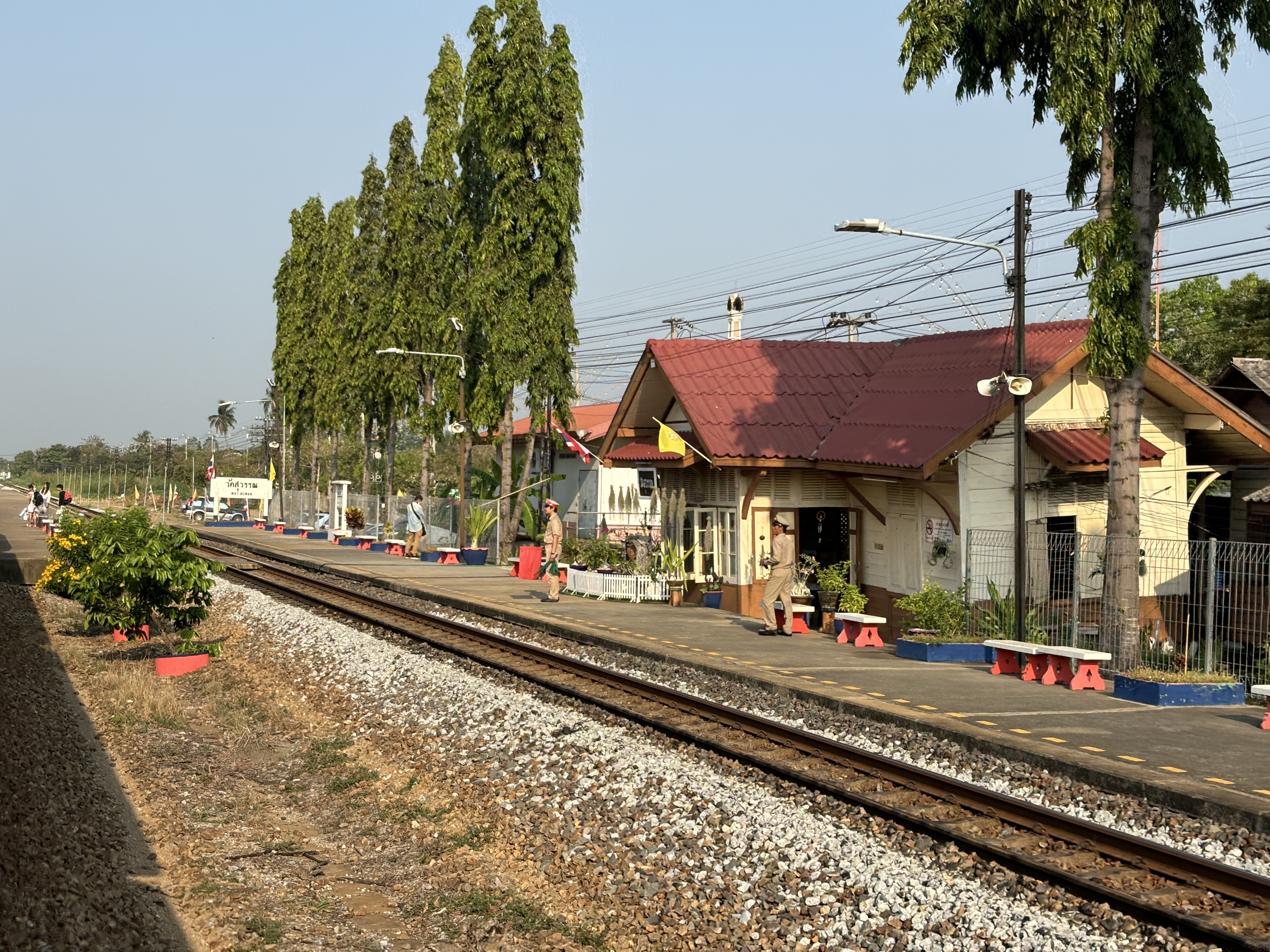

General information
- Location: Nakhon Pathom Local Road No. 2053, Maha Sawat subdistrict, Phutthamonthon district Nakhon Pathom province Thailand
- Coordinates: 13°48′21″N 100°17′1″E
- Operator: State Railway of Thailand
- Manager: Ministry of Transport
- Line: Su-ngai Kolok Main Line
- Platforms: 3
- Tracks: 3

Construction
- Structure type: At-grade

Other information
- Station code: สุ.
- Classification: Class 3

Services
Preceding station	State Railway of Thailand	Following station
Salaya towards Hua Lamphong or Krung Thep Aphiwat	Southern Line	Khlong Maha Sawat Halt towards Su-ngai Kolok
Location

Wat Suwan railway station is a railway station located in Maha Sawat Subdistrict, Phutthamonthon District, Nakhon Pathom. It is a class 3 railway station located 23.469 km (14.6 mi) from Thon Buri railway station.
