= Sala Thammasop =

Coordinates: 13°46′55.1″N 100°22′42.5″E

Sala Thammasop ศาลาธรรมสพน์
- Khwaeng
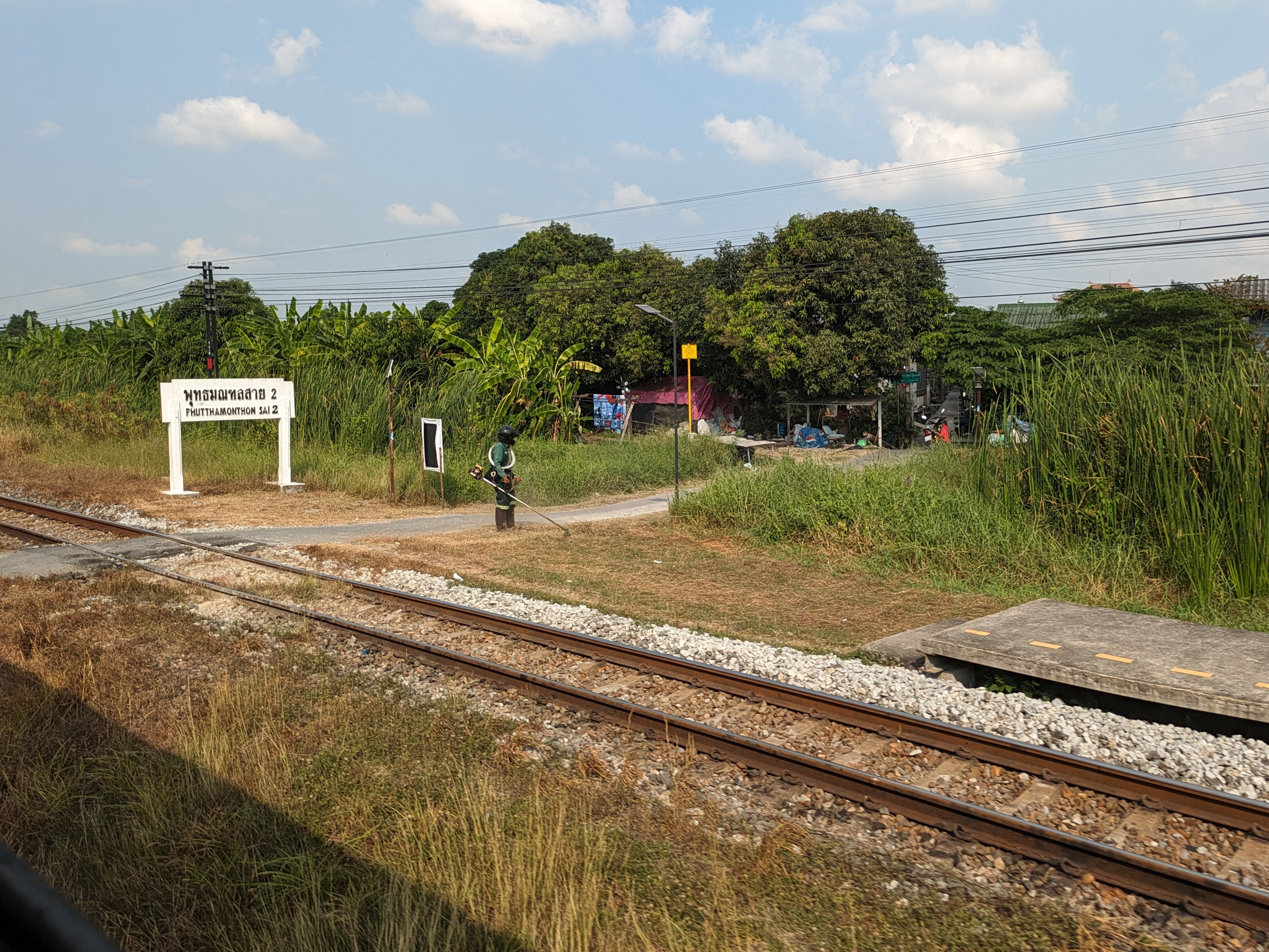
- Phuttamonthon Sai 2 Railway Halt in January 2024

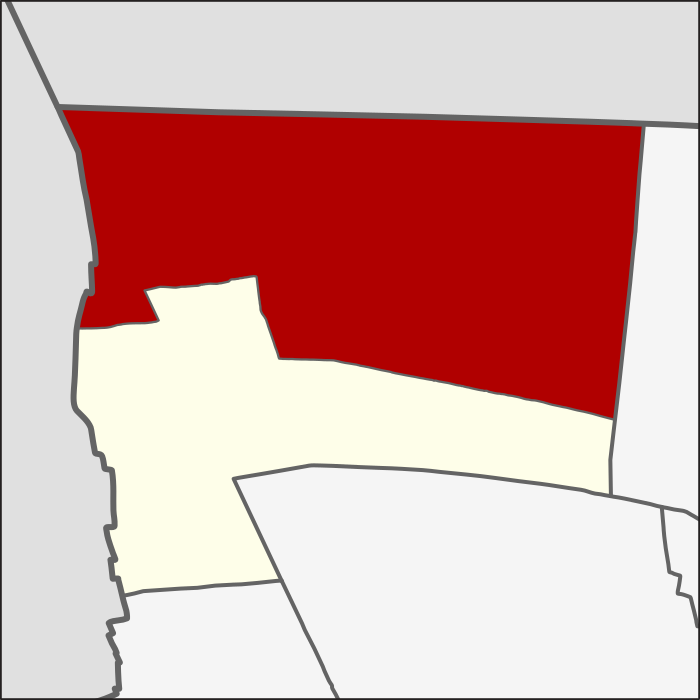
- Location in Thawi Watthana district
- Country: Thailand
- Province: Bangkok
- Khet: Thawi Watthana

Area
  - Total: 28.698 km^{2} (11.080 sq mi)

Population (2020)
  - Total: 55,590
- Time zone: UTC+7 (ICT)
- Postal code: 10170
- TIS 1099: 104802

Sala Thammasop (Thai: ศาลาธรรมสพน์, pronounced [sǎː.lāː tʰām.mā.sòp]) is a khwaeng (sub-district) of Bangkok's Thawi Watthana district. It has an area of 28.698 km^{2} (about 11 mi^{2}).

== History ==
The name Sala Thammasop refers to a 'pavilion for sermons', but in the past it was called Sala Tham Sop meaning 'funeral pavilion'. King Mongkut (Rama IV) ordered the digging of the Khlong Maha Sawat with salas (pavilions) along the banks of the canal. There were twin salas for disposing of the bodies of those who died digging the canal. It was called Sala Tham Sop. After World War II, its name was changed to the more pleasant-sounding Sala Thammasop. Another of the salas was Salaya, a sala that housed medical textbooks. It became the name of Salaya Subdistrict of Phutthamonthon District.

== Places ==
- Sala Thammasop railway station
- Phuttamonthon Sai 2 Railway Halt
- Thongsuk College
- Utthayan Avenue
- Borommaratchachonnani Road
