= Khlong Maha Sawat railway halt =

Railway stop in Maha Sawat, Thailand

Coordinates: 13.8077°N 100.2590°E

Khlong Maha Sawat คลองมหาสวัสดิ์
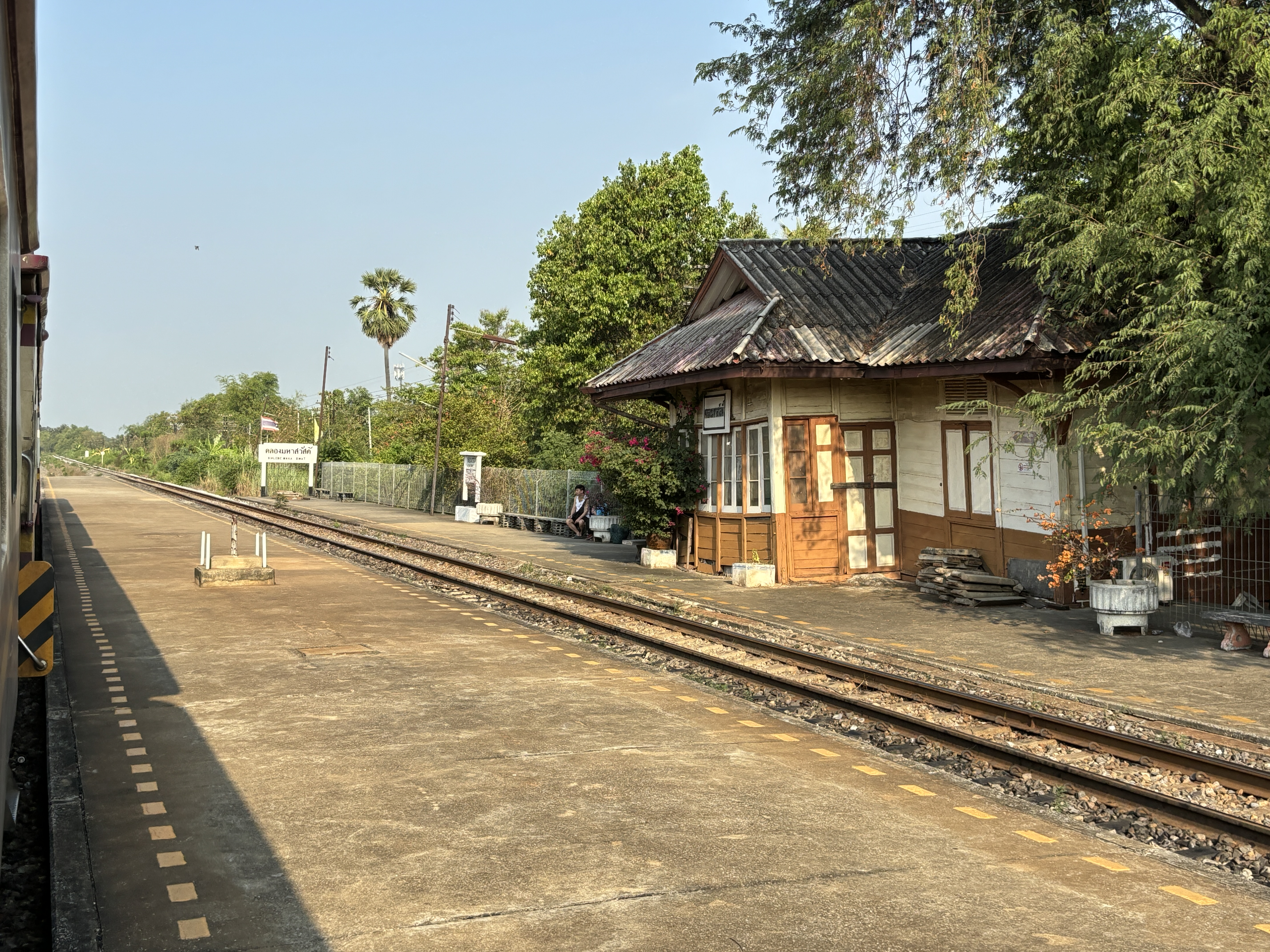

General information
- Location: Maha Sawat Subdistrict, Phutthamonthon district Nakhon Pathom province Thailand
- Operator: State Railway of Thailand
- Manager: Ministry of Transport
- Line: Su-ngai Kolok Main Line
- Platforms: 2
- Tracks: 2

Construction
- Structure type: At-grade

Other information
- Station code: มว.
- Classification: Halt

Services
Preceding station	State Railway of Thailand	Following station
Wat Suwan towards Hua Lamphong or Krung Thep Aphiwat	Southern Line	Wat Ngiu Rai towards Su-ngai Kolok
Location

Khlong Maha Sawat Railway Halt is a railway halt in Maha Sawat Subdistrict, Phutthamonthon District, Nakhon Pathom. It is 27.053 km (16.8 mi) from Thon Buri railway station.
