= National Film Heritage Registry =

Thai film registry

The National Film Heritage Registry of Thailand is a collection of historically and culturally significant films compiled and maintained by the Thai Film Archive for their recognition and preservation. The listed films range from historical footage to works of classic Thai cinema and contemporary feature films, unrestricted by subject matter. The registry was initiated in 2011, and additions to the list are announced annually on 4 October, which the archive observes as Thai Film Conservation Day. As of the twelfth listing in 2022, 233 titles have been added to the registry.

== See also ==
- Category:Thai national heritage films
