= Sala Thammasop railway station =

Railway station in Sala Thammasop, Thailand

Coordinates: 13.8010°N 100.3710°E

Sala Thammasop ศาลาธรรมสพน์
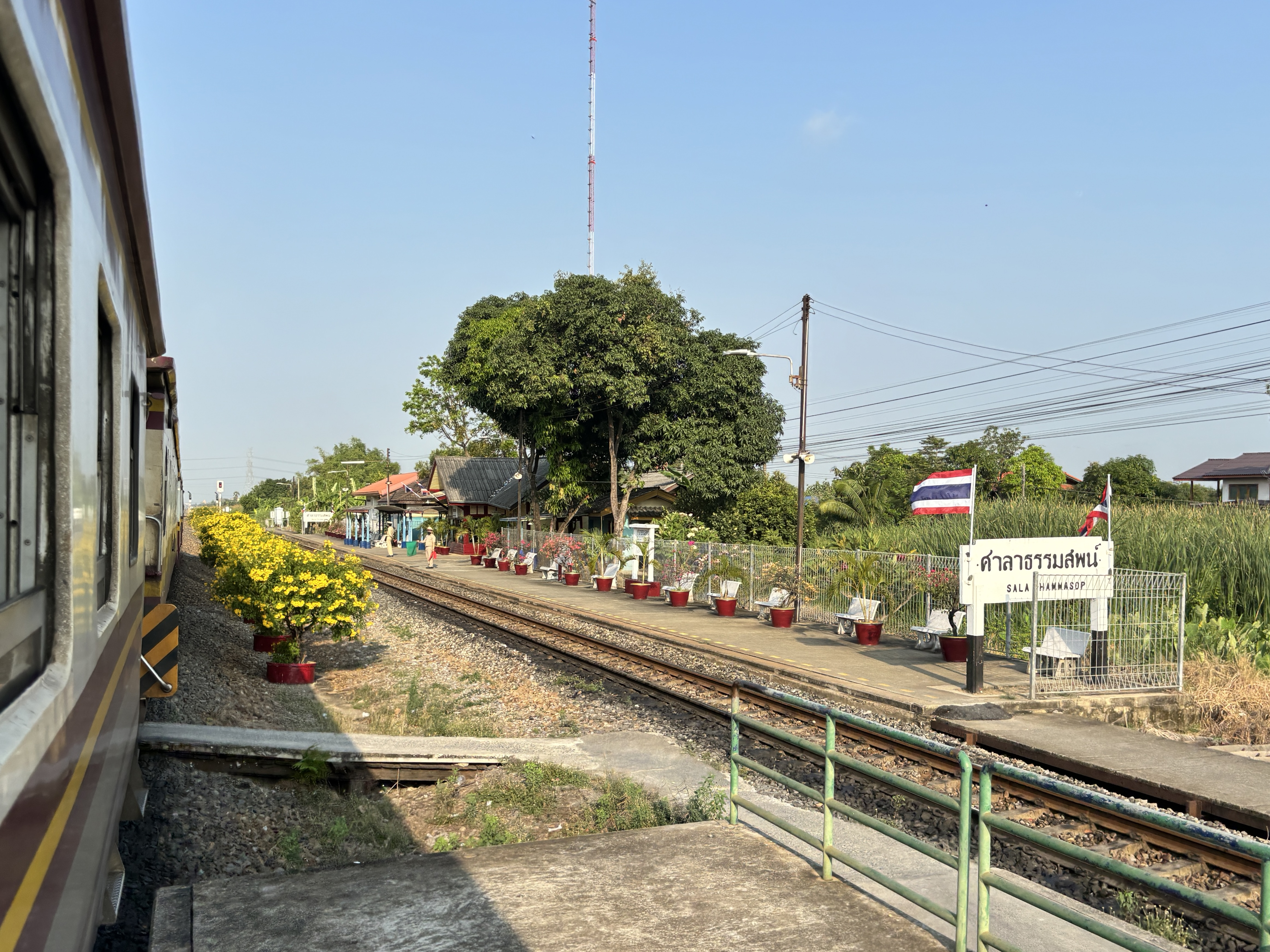

General information
- Location: Soi Sala Thammasop 26, Sala Thammasop Subdistrict, Thawi Watthana District, Bangkok; Central Thailand; Thailand
- Operator: State Railway of Thailand (SRT)
- Manager: Ministry of Transport
- Line: Su-ngai Kolok Main Line
- Distance: 14.05 km (8.7 mi) from Thon Buri
- Platforms: 2
- Tracks: 4

Construction
- Structure type: At-grade

Other information
- Station code: ทพ.
- Classification: Class 3

Services
Preceding station	State Railway of Thailand	Following station
Phuttamonthon Sai 2 Halt towards Hua Lamphong or Krung Thep Aphiwat	Southern Line	Salaya towards Su-ngai Kolok
Location

Sala Thammasop railway station is a railway station located in Sala Thammasop Subdistrict, Thawi Watthana District, Bangkok. It is a class 3 railway station located 14.05 km (8.7 mi) from Thon Buri railway station.

Although it is a minor station, Sala Thammasop offers advance ticket booking services for general passengers like other railway stations. Considered as the last station of southern railway line in the area of Bangkok.

Sala Thammasop railway station is located in Soi Sala Thammasop 26, which is surrounded by an environment similar to the countryside, despite the fact that it is located in Bangkok. It can be accessed by coming from the main road that is about 400 m (1,312.3 ft) away.

In 2011 Thailand great floods, this station was also affected.
