= Phutthamonthon =

Buddhist park in Nakhon Pathom, Thailand

Coordinates: 13°46′34″N 100°19′15″E

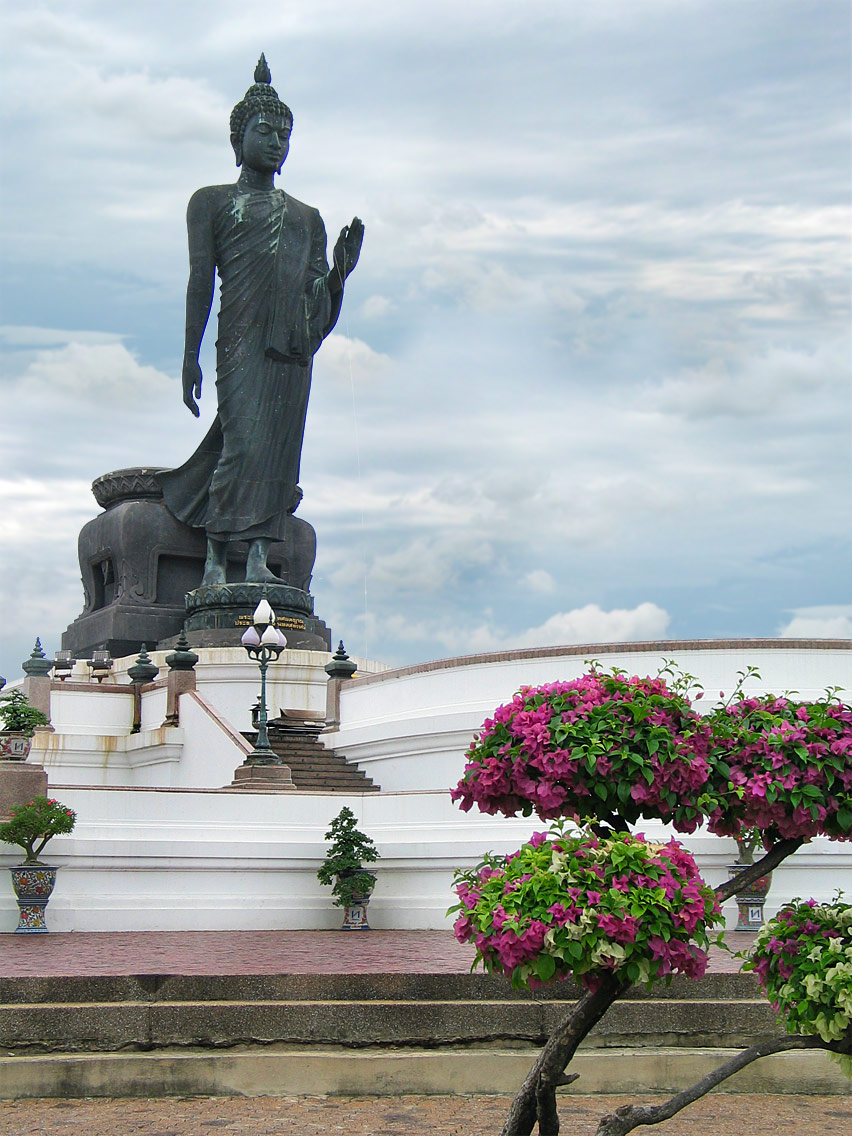
Buddha statue in the Leela attitude at Phutthamonthon

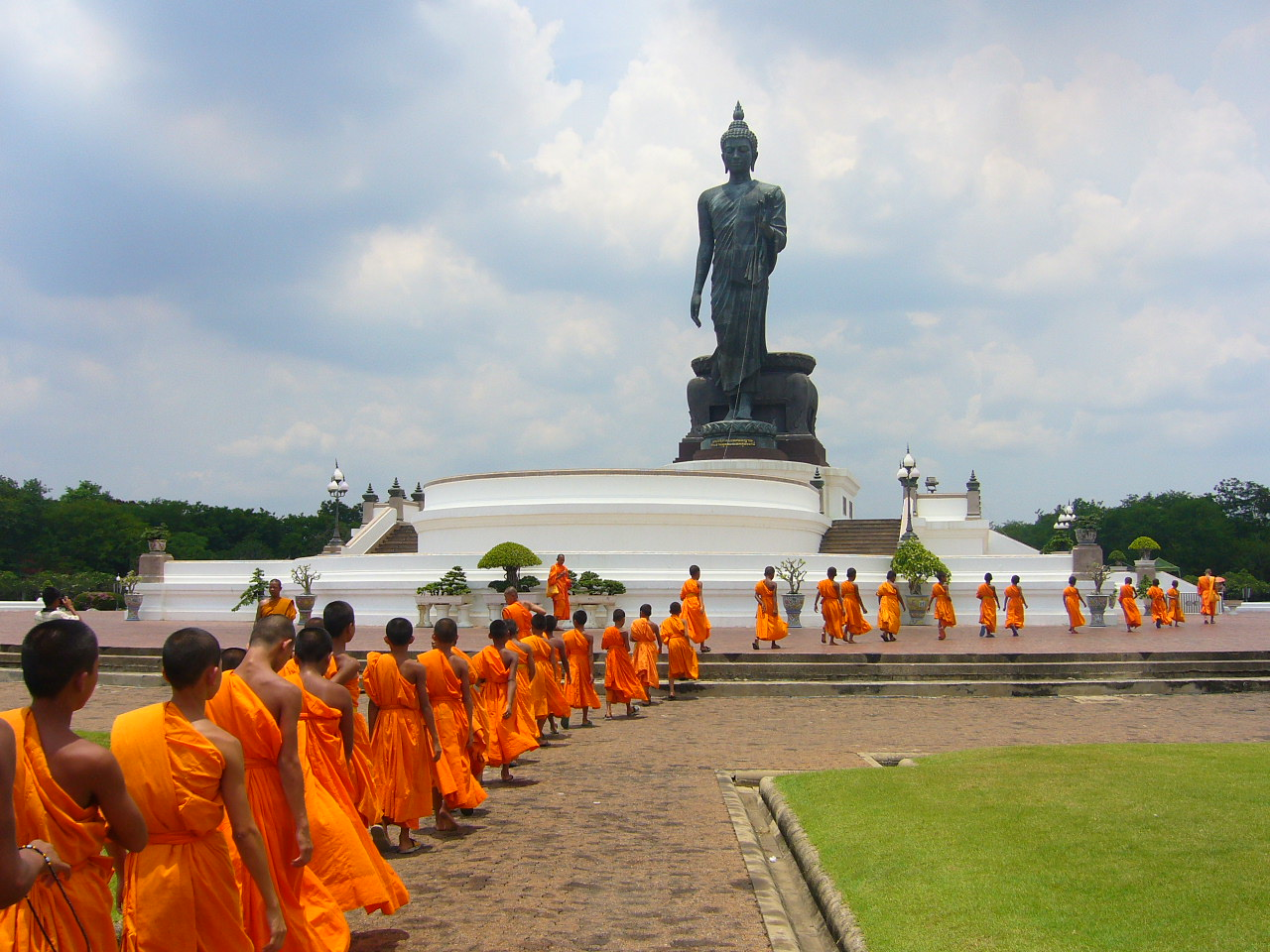
Buddhist monks at Phutthamonthon

Phutthamonthon (Thai: พุทธมณฑล, pronounced [pʰút.tʰā.mōn.tʰōn]; also spelled Buddha Monthon; from Sanskrit Buddha Máṇḍala, 'Buddha's sphere') is a Buddhist park in Salaya subdistrict of Phutthamonthon district, Nakhon Pathom province, Thailand. The park is situated just outside the western border of Bangkok. It is highlighted by a 15.87 metres (52.1 feet) high statue of Gautama Buddha by Corrado Feroci.

The park was created in 1957 (the year 2500 in the Thai Buddhist Era) on the basis of an idea of Thailand's prime minister, Phibunsongkhram. The park covers an area of about 400 hectares, which in traditional Thai units is 2500 rai. Construction started 29 July 1955, and the park was inaugurated on the Vaisakh Bucha day, 13 May 1957.

After a long pause, construction on the park resumed in 1976. The main Buddha statue was built after that time. Already designed in 1955 by art professor Silpa Bhirasri, the statue was cast in 1981. The Leela Attitude statue, 15.875 m high and at the centre of the park, was given the name Phra Si Sakkaya Thotsaphonlayan Prathan Phutthamonthon Suthat (Thai: พระศรีศากยะทศพลญาณ ประธานพุทธมณฑลสุทรรศน์, literally 'the Graceful Statue of the Shakyamuni who was of the Tenfold Power, the Presiding Buddha of the Beautiful Phutthamonthon') by King Bhumibol Adulyadej. Around the statue are sites memorialising the four main stations in the life of Buddha: his birth symbolized by seven lotus flowers, his enlightenment under the Bodhi tree, his first sermon, and his death. Another important building is the marble viharn, which contains the entire Buddhist canon engraved in 1418 marble stelas.

In July 2017, a group of smooth-coated otters was spotted in the park. They are believed to be descendants of the otter population that inhabited this area before it was developed into the park it is today.
