= Wat Ngiu Rai railway station =

Railway station in Ngio Rai, Thailand

Coordinates: 13.8078°N 100.2160°E

Wat Ngiu Rai วัดงิ้วราย
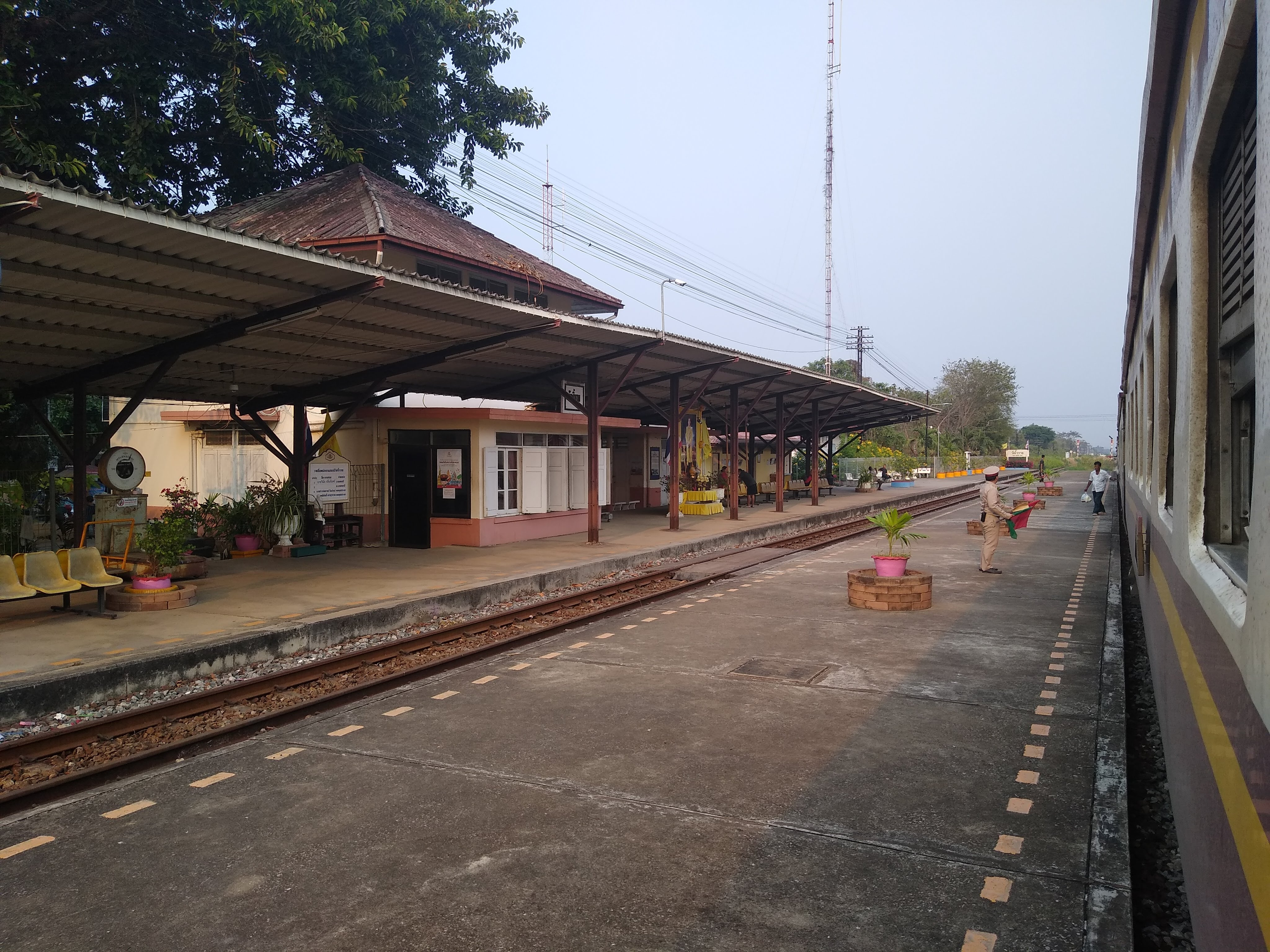

General information
- Location: Nakhon Pathom Local Road No. 4120, Ngiu Rai subdistrict, Nakhon Chai Si district Nakhon Pathom province Thailand
- Operator: State Railway of Thailand
- Manager: Ministry of Transport
- Line: Su-ngai Kolok Main Line
- Platforms: 3
- Tracks: 3

Construction
- Structure type: At-grade

Other information
- Station code: งร.
- Classification: Class 2

Services
Preceding station	State Railway of Thailand	Following station
Khlong Maha Sawat Halt towards Hua Lamphong or Krung Thep Aphiwat	Southern Line	Nakhon Chai Si towards Su-ngai Kolok
Location

Wat Ngiu Rai railway station is a railway station located in Ngiu Rai Subdistrict, Nakhon Chai Si District, Nakhon Pathom, Thailand. It is a class 2 railway station located 30.8 km (19.1 mi) from Thon Buri railway station.
