= Leela attitude =

Attitude of Buddha in Thai art

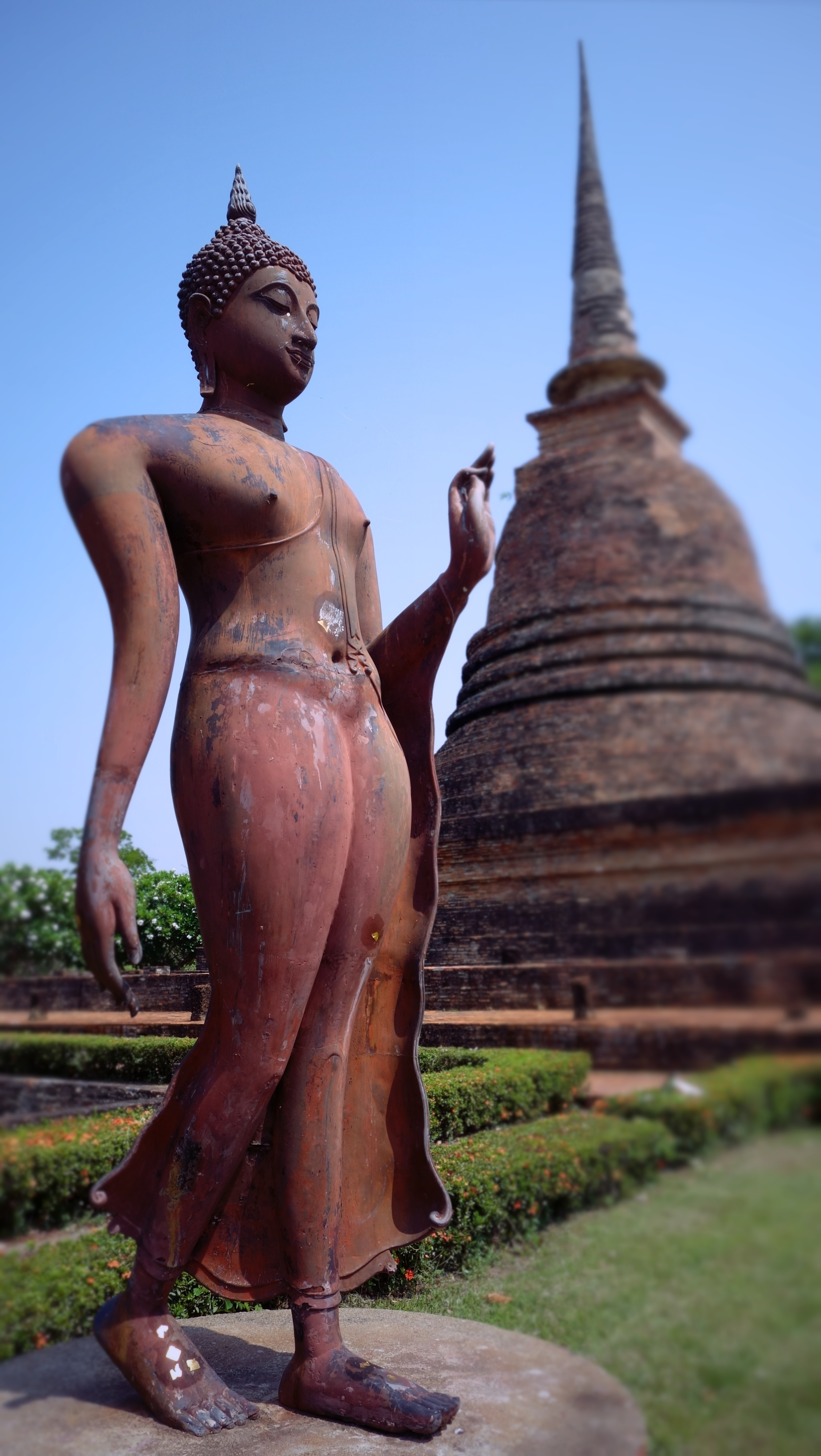
The Buddha in Leela Attitude at Wat Sa Sri in Sukhothai Historical Park, Thailand

Leela attitude is an attitude of Buddha in Southeast art of which the Buddha is stepping with his right foot and his right-hand swinging and the other hand put towards to the front. The attitude is sometimes called the Walking Buddha.

The attitude refers to the episode where he is walking back to the earth from Tavatimsa with Devas and Brahmas that follow.

== Names ==
The attitude is known by various names throughout Southeast Asia, including as abaya mudra (Burmese: အဘယမုဒြာ; abhaya mudrā) in Myanmar and as pang lila (Thai: ปางลีลา; RTGS: pang lila) in Thailand.

== Gallery ==
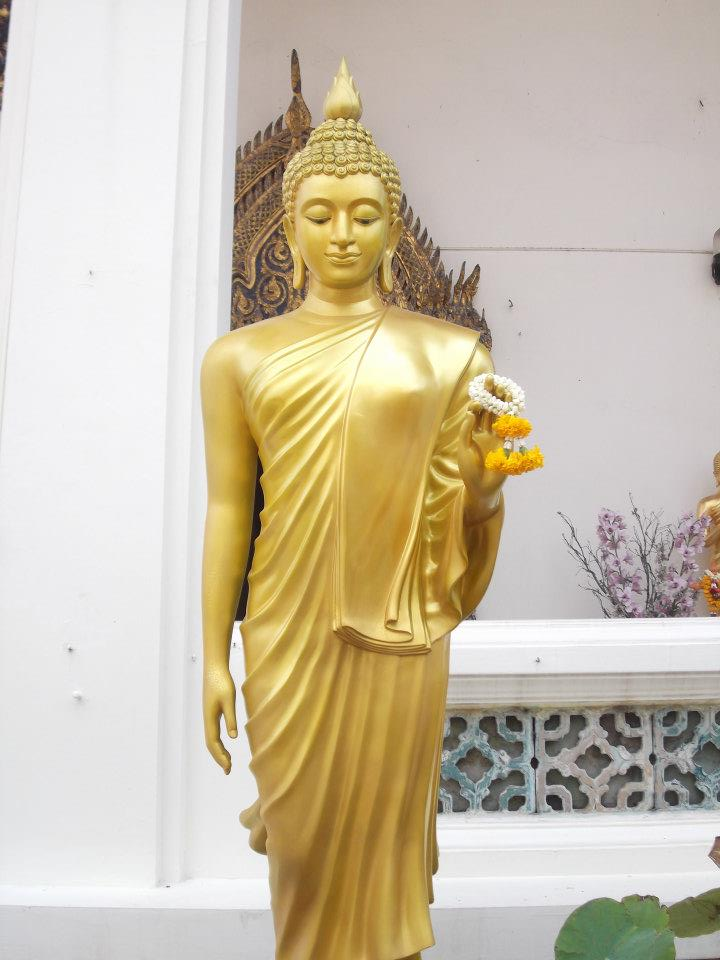
at Wat Yannawa, Bangkok

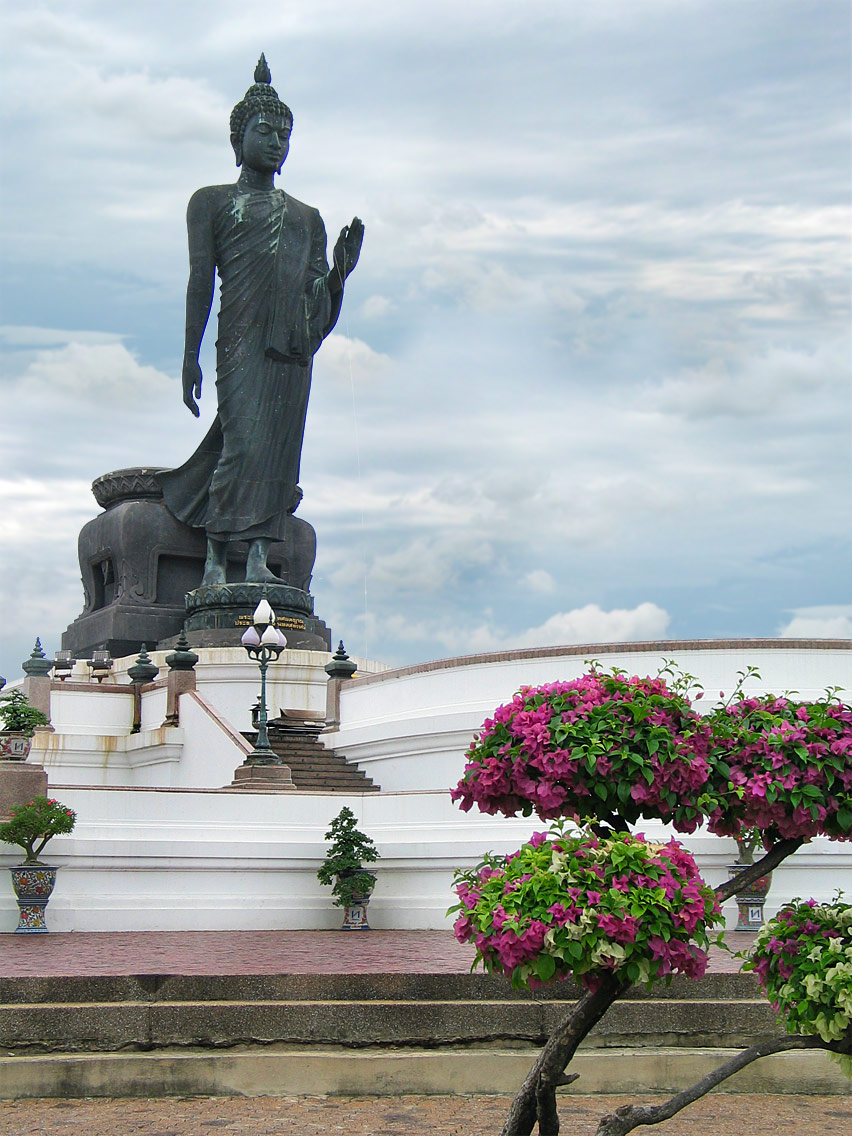
at Phutthamonthon, Nakhon Pathom province

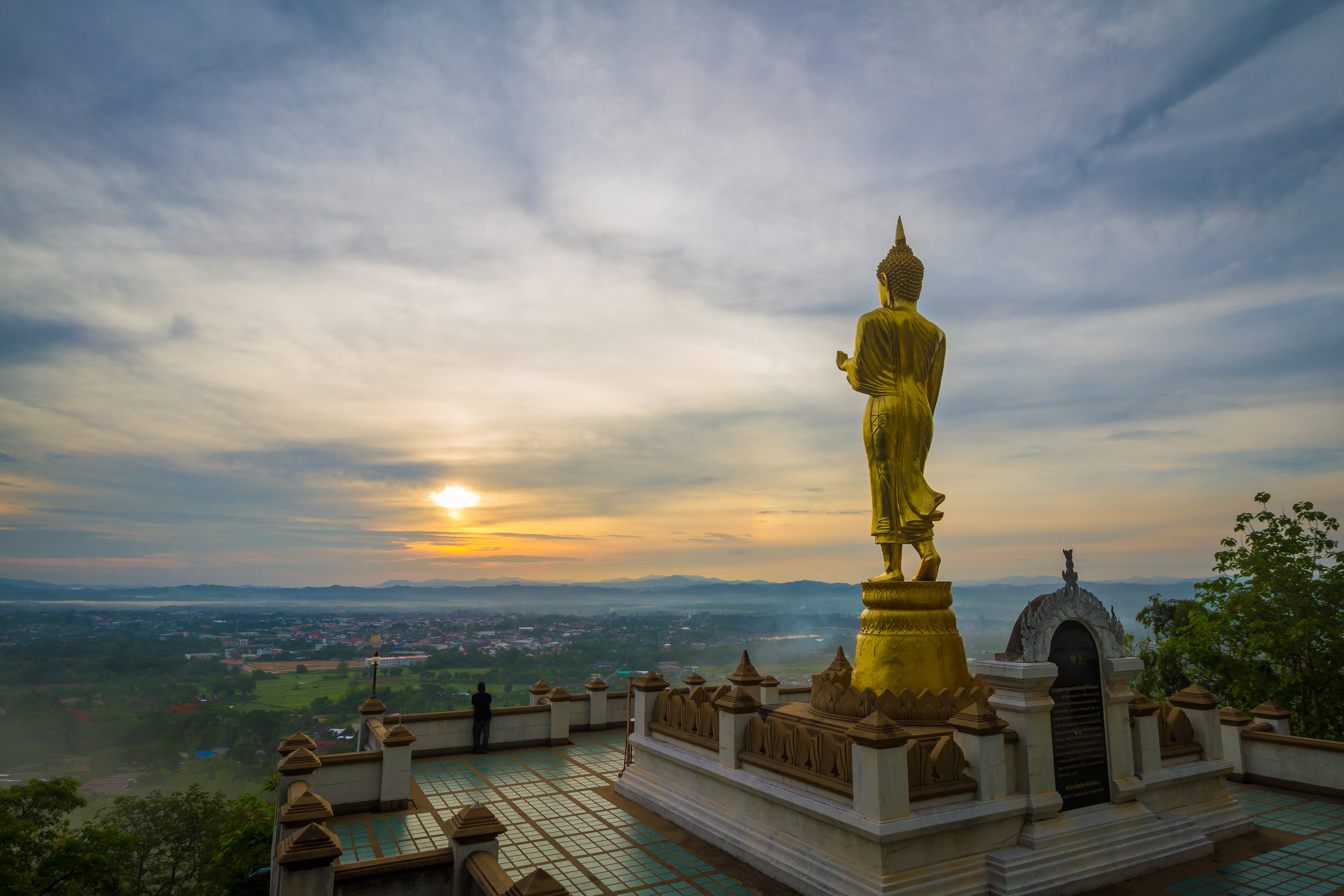
Buddha statue at Wat Phra Thart Khao Noi, Nan province

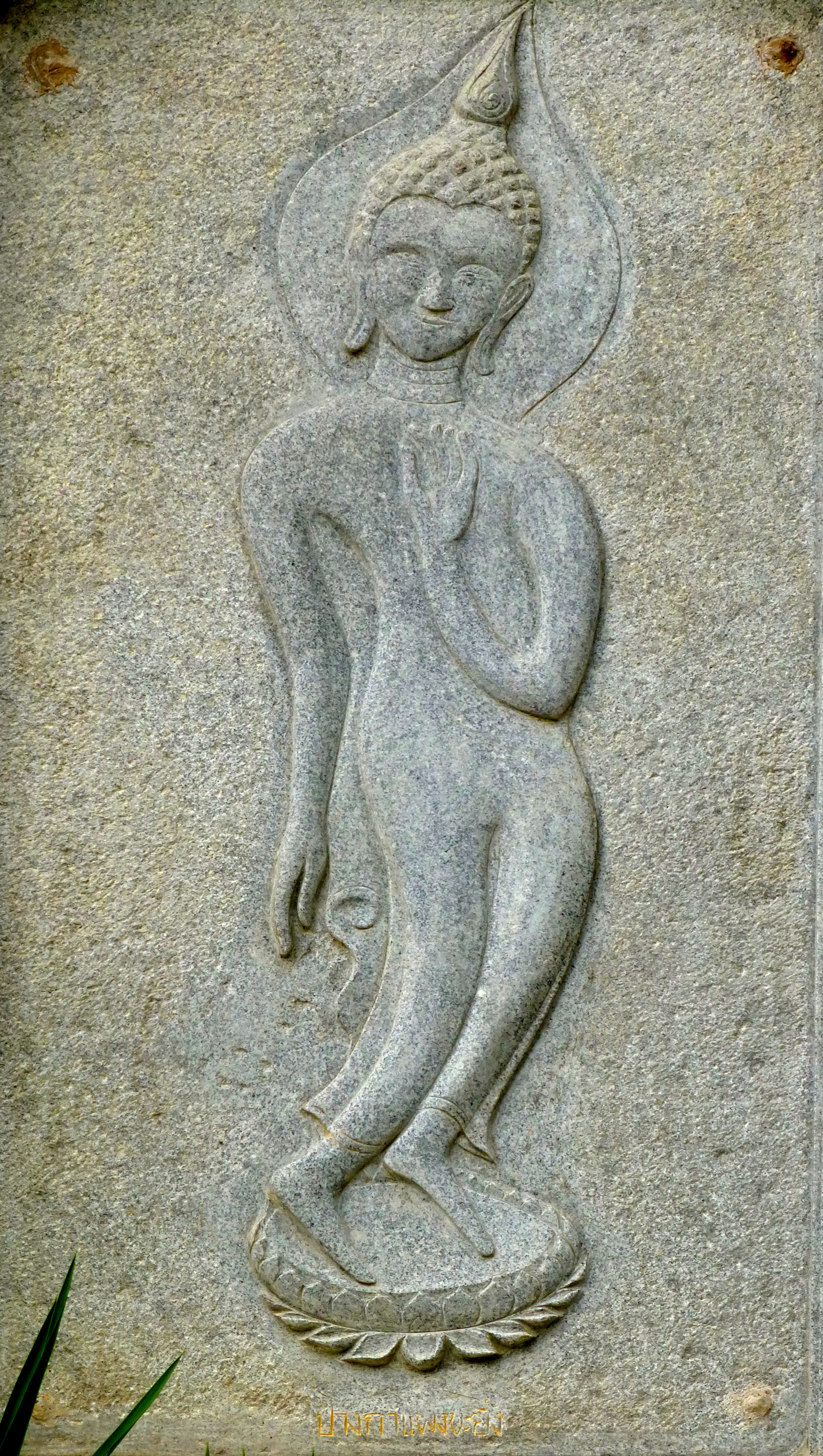
at Wat Tham Khao Roup Chang, Nakhon Ratchasima province

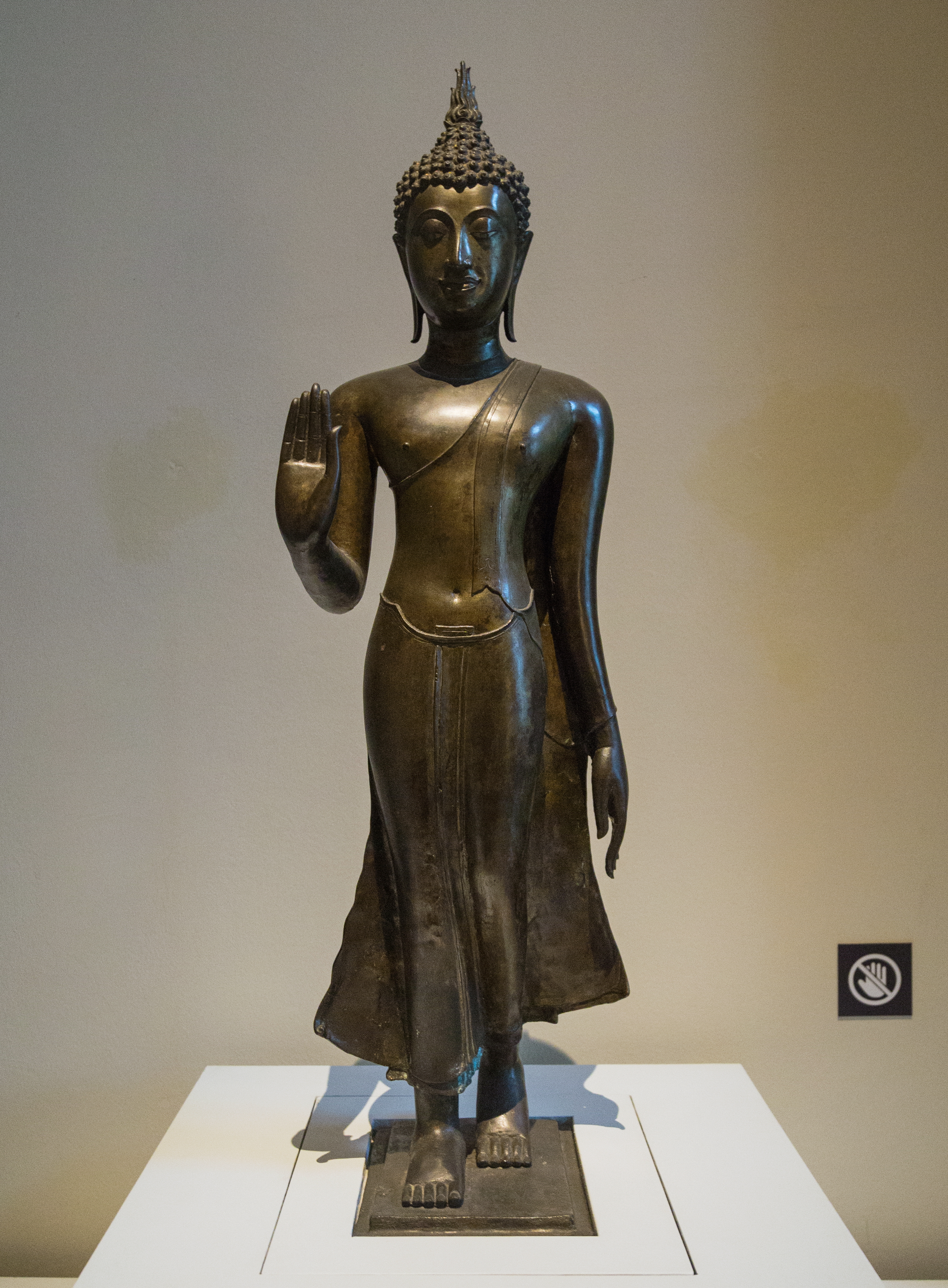
at Asian Civilisations Museum, Singapore

== See also ==
- Iconography of Gautama Buddha in Laos and Thailand
- Maravijaya attitude
- Meditation attitude
- Mudra
- Reclining Buddha
- Kouros
- Contrapposto
