= Ban Chimphli railway halt =

Railway station in Chimphli, Thailand

Ban Chimphli บ้านฉิมพลี
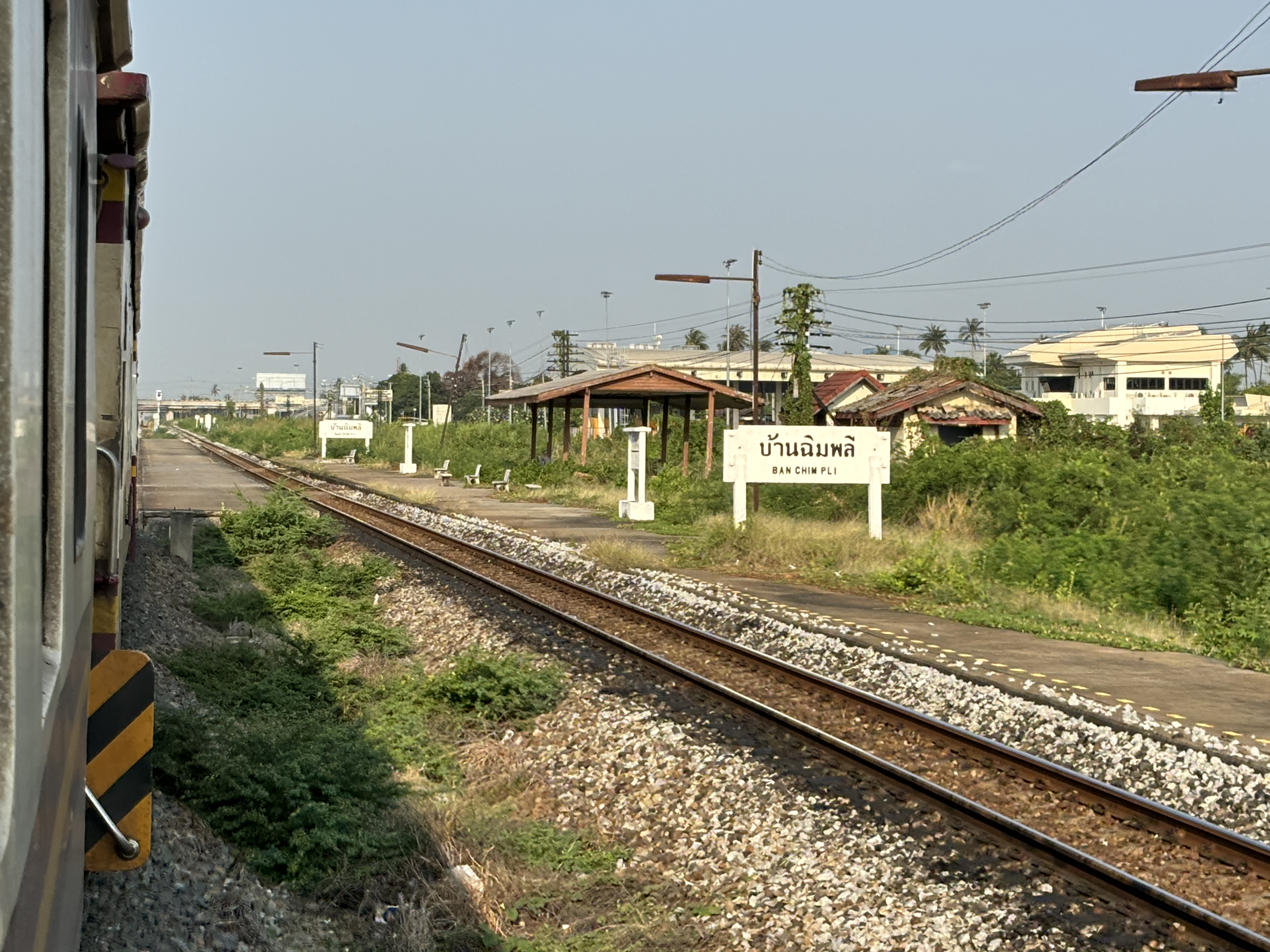

General information
- Location: Chimphli Subdistrict, Taling Chan District, Bangkok; Central Thailand; Thailand
- Coordinates: 13.799296°N 100.420603°E
- Operator: State Railway of Thailand
- Manager: Ministry of Transport
- Line: Su-ngai Kolok Main Line
- Distance: 8.643 km (5.4 mi) from Thon Buri
- Platforms: 3
- Tracks: 3

Construction
- Structure type: At-grade

Other information
- Station code: ฉพ.
- Classification: Halt

Services
Preceding station	State Railway of Thailand	Following station
Taling Chan Junction towards Hua Lamphong or Krung Thep Aphiwat	Southern Line	Phuttamonthon Sai 2 Halt towards Su-ngai Kolok
Location

Ban Chimphli Railway Halt (Thai: ที่หยุดรถบ้านฉิมพลี) is a railway halt located in Chimphli Subdistrict, Taling Chan District, Bangkok, Thailand. It is located 8.643 km (5.4 mi) from Thon Buri Railway Station.
