= Khlong Yong =

Coordinates: 13°52′56.1″N 100°17′16.6″E

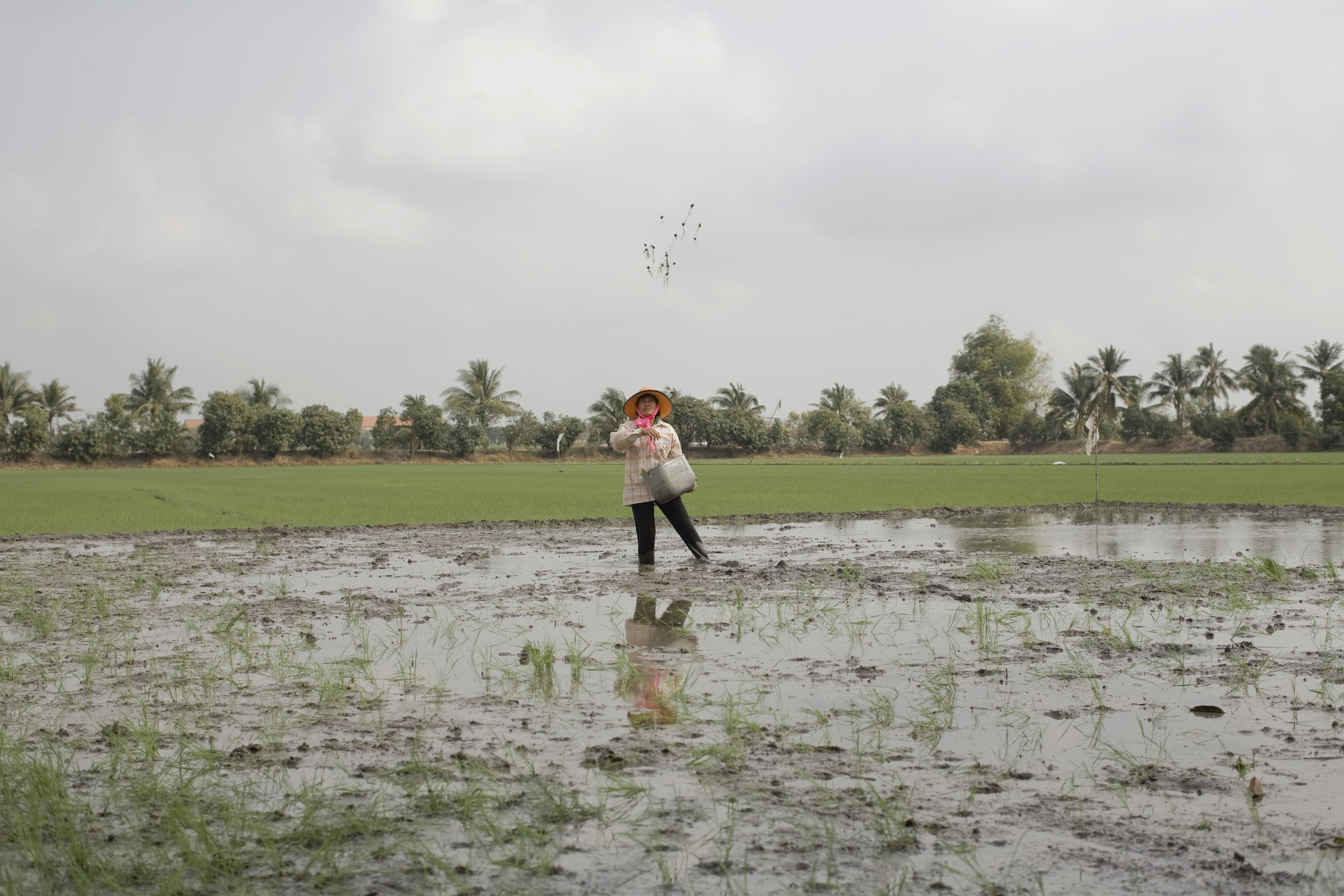
Farming, Khlong Yong, 2011

Khlong Yong (Thai: คลองโยง, pronounced [kʰlɔ̄ːŋ jōːŋ]) is one of three tambons (sub-districts) of Phutthamonthon District, Nakhon Pathom Province, on the outskirts of Bangkok in central Thailand.

== Geography ==
Khlong Yong is about 14 km (8.7 mi) north of the district office.

Neighbouring tambons are (from the north clockwise): Naraphirom of Bang Len District; Nong Phrao Ngai of Sai Noi District; Ban Yai of Bang Yai District, Nonthaburi Province; and Salaya, Maha Sawat, Lan Tak Fa, and Bang Kaeo Fa of Nakhon Chai Si District.

Khlong Yong covers 19,728 rai (31.565 km^{2}; 12.187 sq mi) and includes eight villages. This area has many khlongs ('canals') flowing through it, including Khlong Yong and Khlong Naraphirom.

== History ==
Khlong Yong is considered the first community in the country. It received a community title deed to that effect on 12 February 2011 from the government of Abhisit Vejjajiva. Most Khlong Yong locals work in agriculture.

== Administration ==
The tambon is divided into seven administrative mubans (villages)

No.	Name	Thai
1.	Ban Khlong Yong	บ้านคลองโยง
2.	Ban Khlong Sawang Arom (Chaiyakhan)	บ้านคลองสว่างอารมณ์ (ชัยขันธ์)
3.	Ban Laen Hai	บ้านแหลนหาย
4.	Ban Wat Makluea	บ้านวัดมะเกลือ
5.	Ban Don Thong	บ้านดอนทอง
6.	Ban Khlong Yong Mai	บ้านคลองโยงใหม่
7.	Ban Khlong Soi	บ้านคลองซอย

The area of the tambon is shared by local government, subdistrict-municipality Khlong Yong (เทศบาลตำบลคลองโยง).
