= Phuttamonthon Sai 2 railway halt =

Railway station in Sala Thammasop, Thailand

Phuttamonthon Sai 2 พุทธมณฑล สาย 2
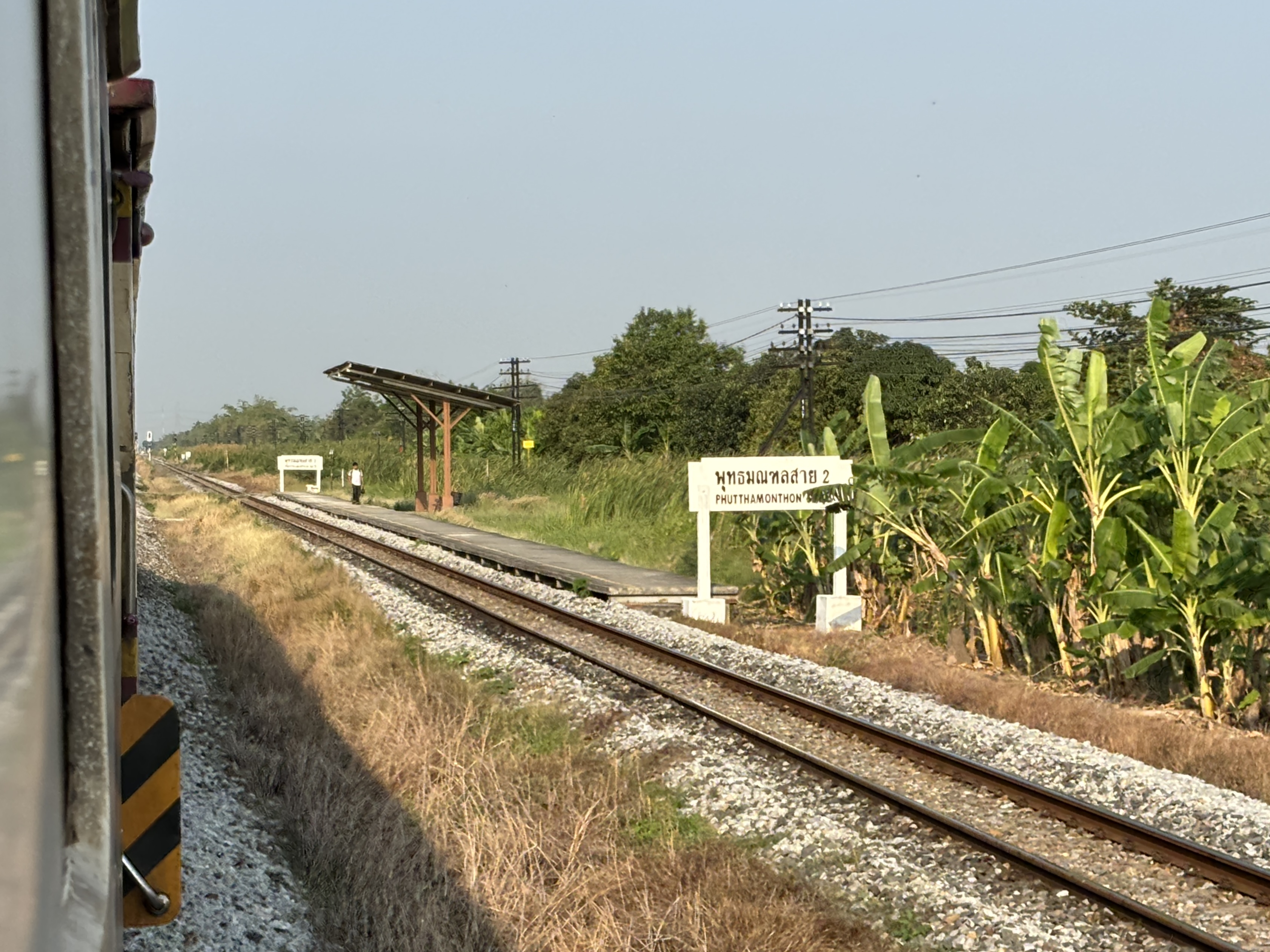

General information
- Location: Phuttamonthon Sai 2 Road, Sala Thammasop Subdistrict, Thawi Watthana District, Bangkok; Central Thailand; Thailand
- Coordinates: 13.7999°N 100.3950°E
- Operator: State Railway of Thailand
- Manager: Ministry of Transport
- Line: Su-ngai Kolok Main Line
- Distance: 11.47 km (7.1 mi) from Thon Buri
- Platforms: 1
- Tracks: 2

Construction
- Structure type: At-grade

Other information
- Station code: ทล.
- Classification: Halt

Services
| Preceding station | State Railway of Thailand | Following station |
|---|---|---|
| Ban Chimphli Halt towards Hua Lamphong or Krung Thep Aphiwat | Southern Line | Sala Thammasop towards Su-ngai Kolok |
Location

Phuttamonthon Sai 2 railway halt is a railway halt located in Sala Thammasop Subdistrict, Thawi Watthana District, Bangkok. It is located 11.47 km (7.1 mi) from Thon Buri Railway Station. It is named after Phuttamonthon Sai 2 Road, which the halt is located at the north end of it.
