= Salaya, Thailand =

Coordinates: 13°48′09.2″N 100°19′15.1″E

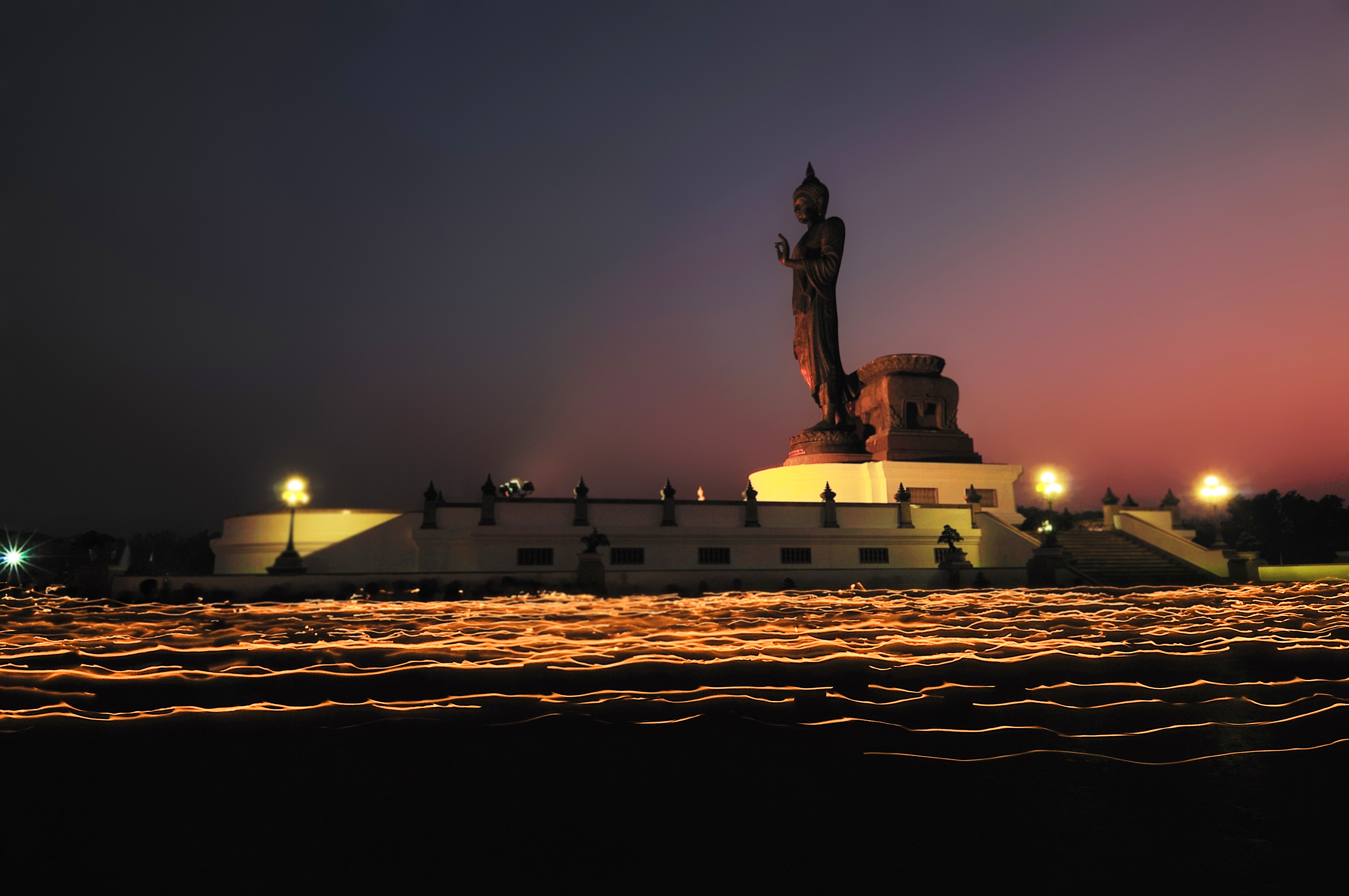
Phutthamonthon, a Buddhist park, Salaya Subdistrict

Salaya (Thai: ศาลายา, pronounced [sǎː.lāː.jāː]) is a tambon (sub-district) of Phutthamonthon district, Nakhon Pathom province, central Thailand, to the west of Bangkok and part of the Bangkok Metropolitan Region. In 2017 it had a population of 9,784 people, Salaya contains six mubans (villages).

== History ==
The word Salaya means 'medicine pavilion'. It got this name because in the reign of King Mongkut (Rama IV), he ordered the digging of a khlong ('canal'), Khlong Maha Sawat through this area and building a salas ('Thai pavilion') on both banks of the khlong.

For Salaya is a pavilion that contains textbooks about traditional Thai medicine for educating the general public, including being a sanatorium as well.

Because it is close to Bangkok, Salaya has many important places such as Phutthamonthon, Utthayan Avenue, Mahidol University, Salaya railway station, Thai Film Archive, and the Naval Education Department.

A local prominent shopping center CentralPlaza Salaya, indeed, it is located in the area of Bang Toei in neighbouring district Sam Phran.

== Administration ==
=== Central administration ===
Salaya is divided into six administrative villages:

No.	Name	Thai
1.	Ban Wat Suwan	บ้านวัดสุวรรณ
2.	Ban Khlong Tali (Khlong Yong)	บ้านคลองตาหลี (คลองโยง)
3.	Ban Nong Khae	บ้านหนองแค
4.	Ban Tapin	บ้านตาพิน
5.	Ban Salaya	บ้านศาลายา
6.	Ban Phutthamonthon	บ้านพุทธมณฑล

=== Local administration ===
The area of the tambon is shared by two local governments:

- Thesaban tambon (subdistrict municipality) Salaya (เทศบาลตำบลศายาลา)
- Subdistrict administrative organization (SAO) Salaya (องค์การบริหารส่วนตำบลศาลายา)

== See also ==
- Sala Thammasop
