= Wat Chaiyaphrueksamala =

- วัดชัยพฤกษมาลา
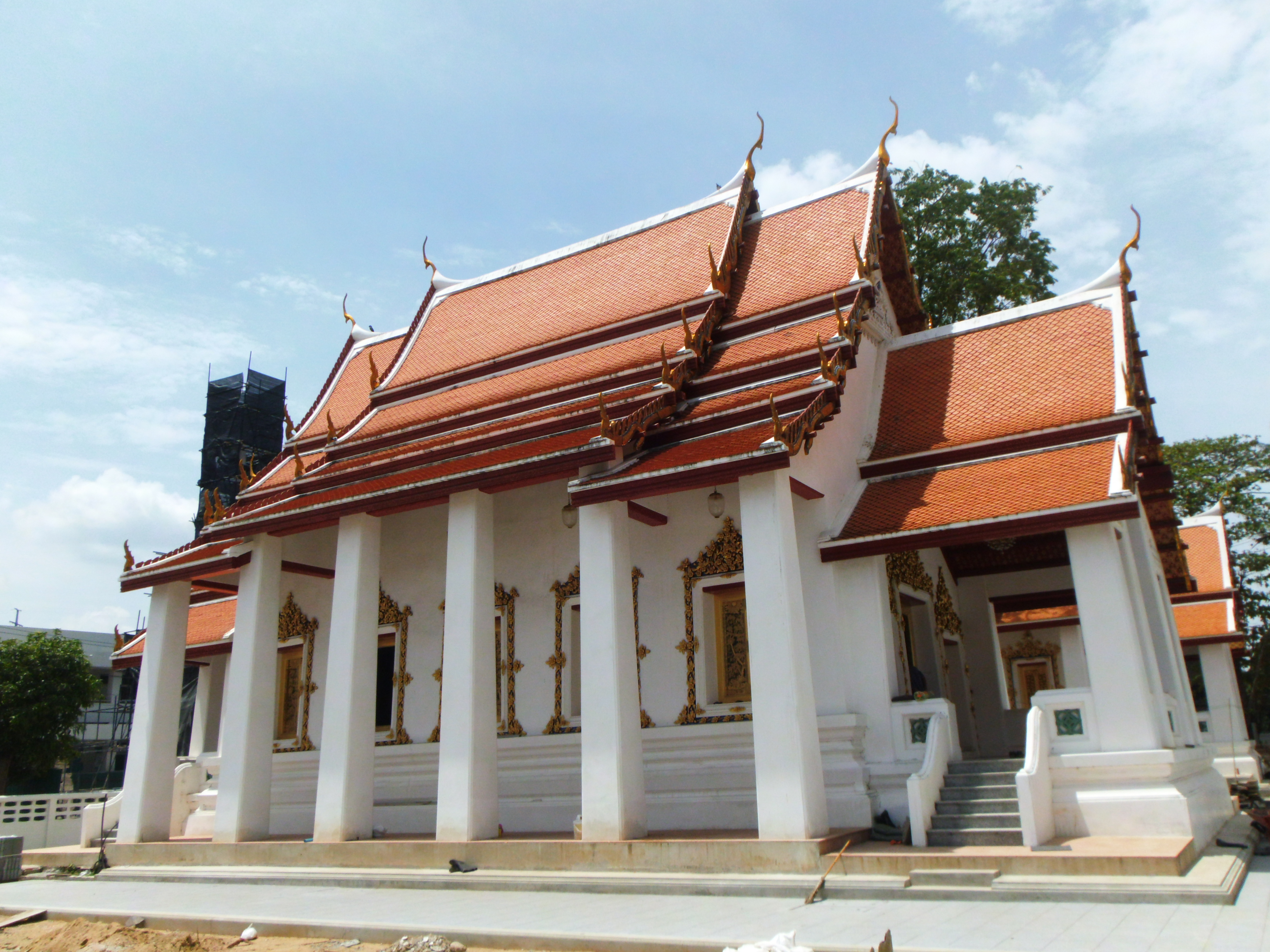
- The new ordination hall

- Location within Bangkok

Religion
- Affiliation: Buddhism

Location
- Location: 2, Mu 4, Chaiyaphruek Rd., Taling Chan, Taling Chan, Bangkok
- Country: Thailand
- Interactive map of Wat Chaiyaphrueksamala
- Coordinates: 13.795443°N 100.466885°E

Wat Chaiyaphrueksamala (Thai: วัดชัยพฤกษมาลาราชวรวิหาร) or commonly known in short as Wat Chaiyaphruek (pronounced [wát t͡ɕʰāj.jā.pʰrɯ́k]) is a second-class royal Buddhist temple of ratchaworawihan status. It is located in the northeast of Taling Chan District, Bangkok, situated at the mouth of Khlong Maha Sawat where it converges with Khlong Bangkok Noi. Across the canal lies the area of Tambon Wat Chalo, Bang Kruai District, Nonthaburi Province.

== History ==
The temple was built during the Ayutthaya period. On founding the new city at Thonburi in 1767, some brick structures of the temple were disassembled and the brick removed for use in the construction of the new city wall. During the reign of King Rama I (1782–1809), the Crown Prince Chim (later King Rama II) attempted to rebuild this abandoned temple, but the construction was not completed because of the war. The work was not undertaken again until 1851 when King Rama IV (1851–1868) donated some money to complete the restoration. He named it "Wat Chaiyaphrueksamala". In the old ordination hall, the principal Buddha image in the Māravijaya attitude is enshrined, and was named Phra Phutthachai Mongkhon (พระพุทธชัยมงคล). A stūpa, built in the reign of King Rama IV, was restored by M.C. Phoem Ladawan in 1935 and was used to house the royal relics of King Rama III (1824–1851) and other royal members as well.

The new ordination hall facing the north (Khlong Maha Sawat), it was built in 1973 and completed in 1974. King Rama IX (1946–2016) presided over the opening ceremony on March 30, 1978 and performed the principal Buddha image casting ceremony.

The sermon hall is located on the east side of the temple near Khlong Maha Sawat. Built in 1938, it is a Thai-style building made of bricks and cement. It is currently used as part of the music and dance activities of Kusol Suksa School, an elementary school under the patronage of the temple.

The site was once under the administration of Tambon Maha Sawat, Amphoe Bang Kruai of Nonthaburi Province.

== Gallery ==
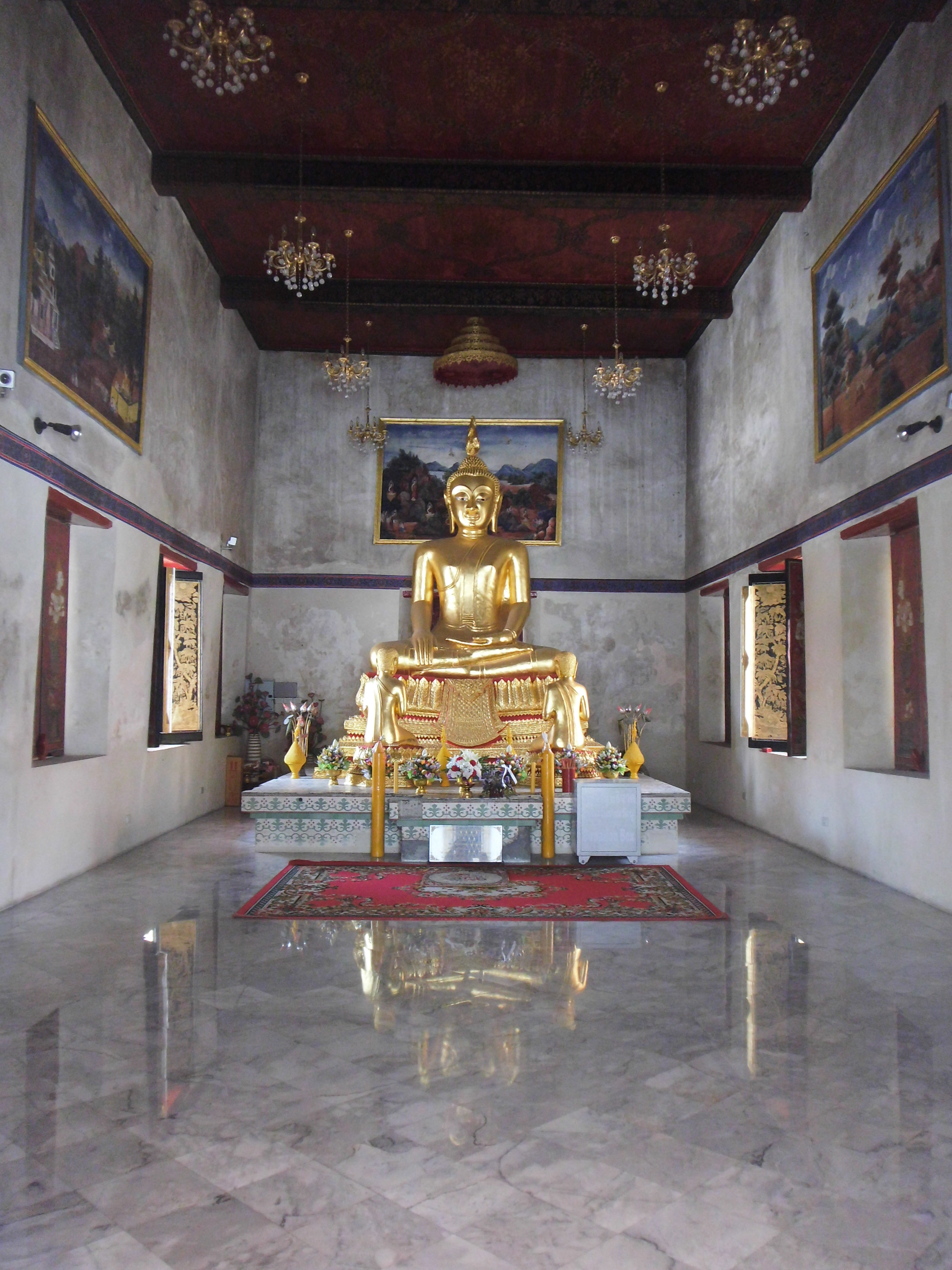
The principal Buddha image in the old ordination hall

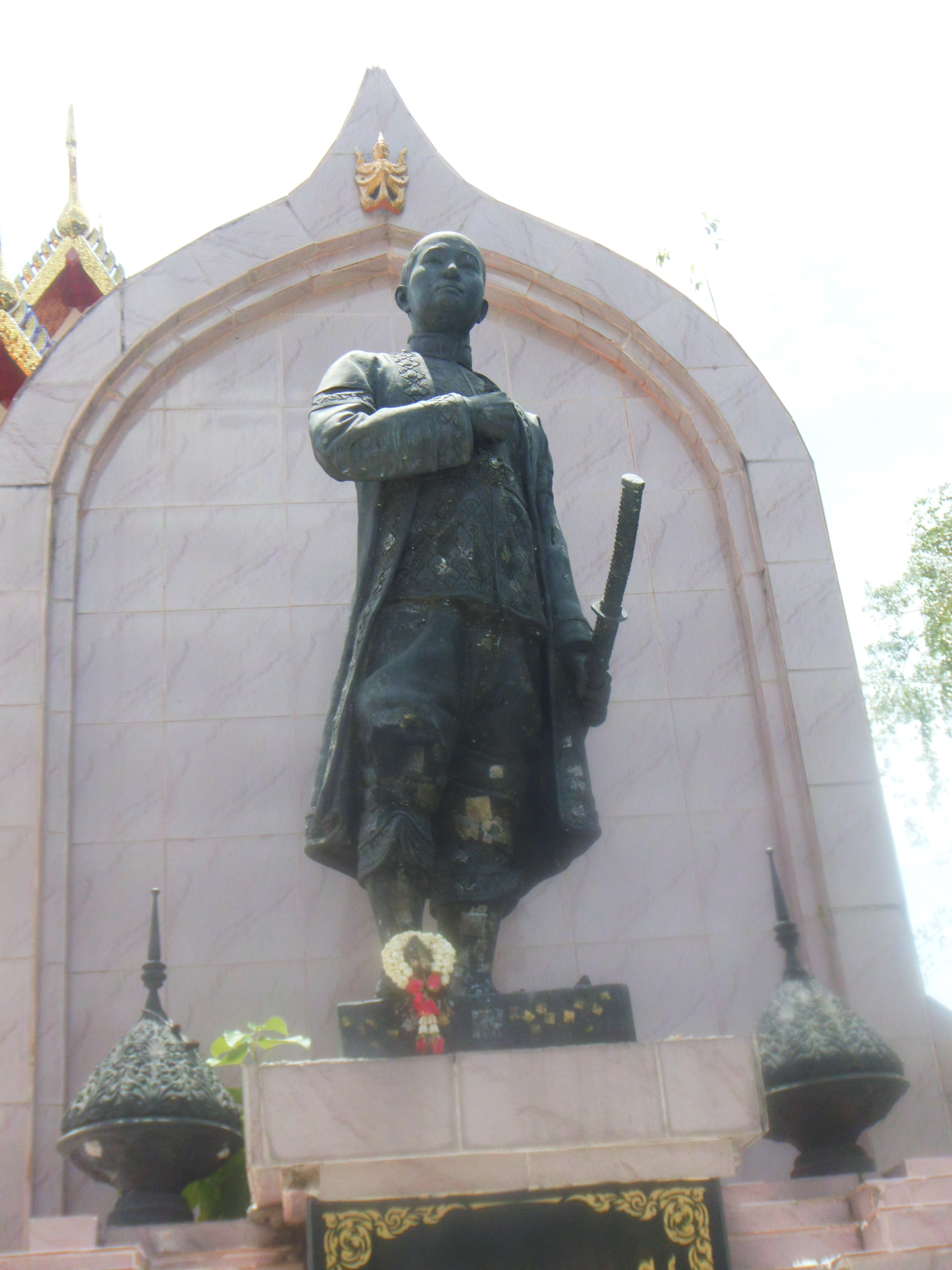
Memorial of King Rama II, a temple restorer

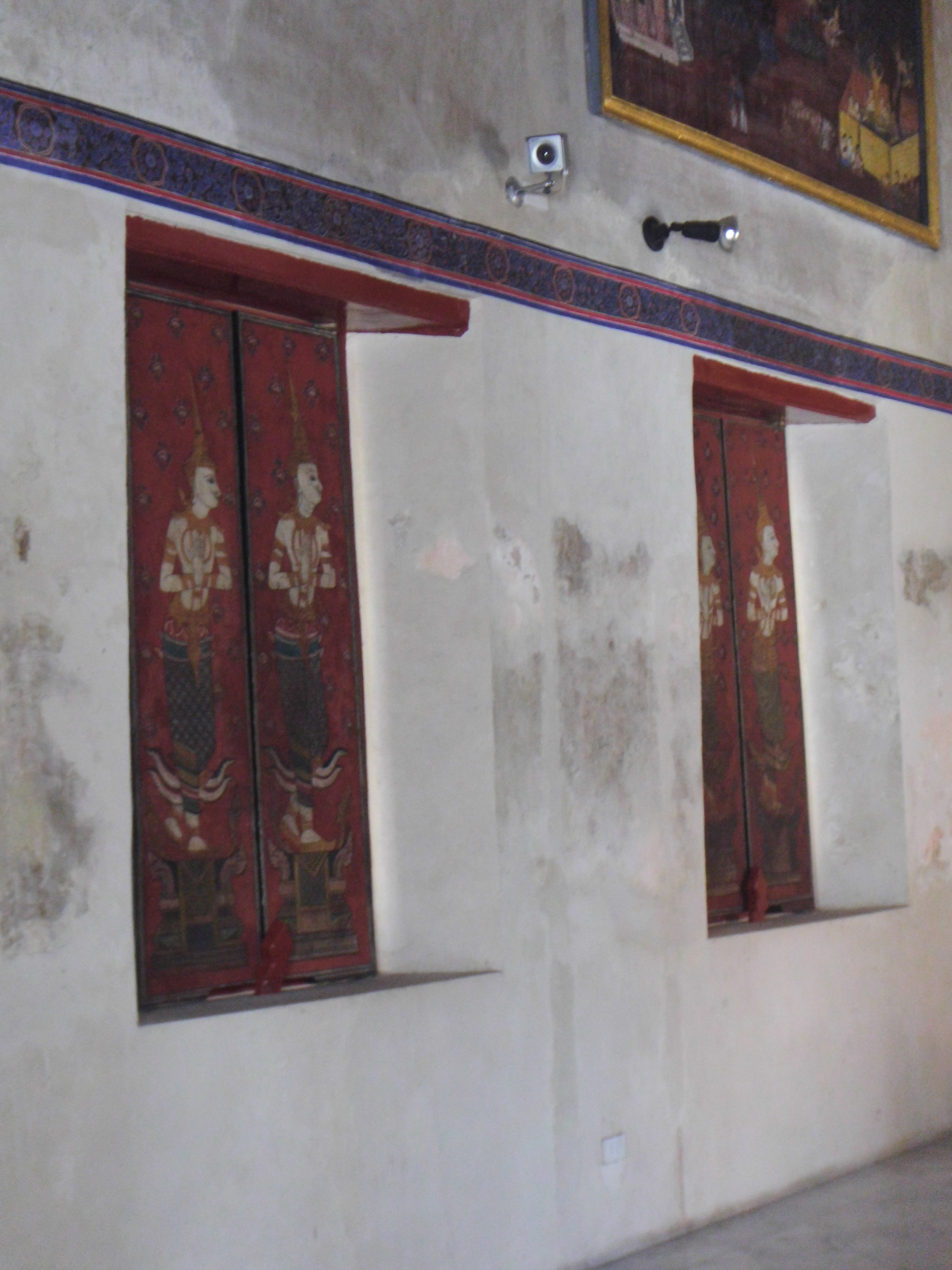
The decorative windows inside the old ordination hall

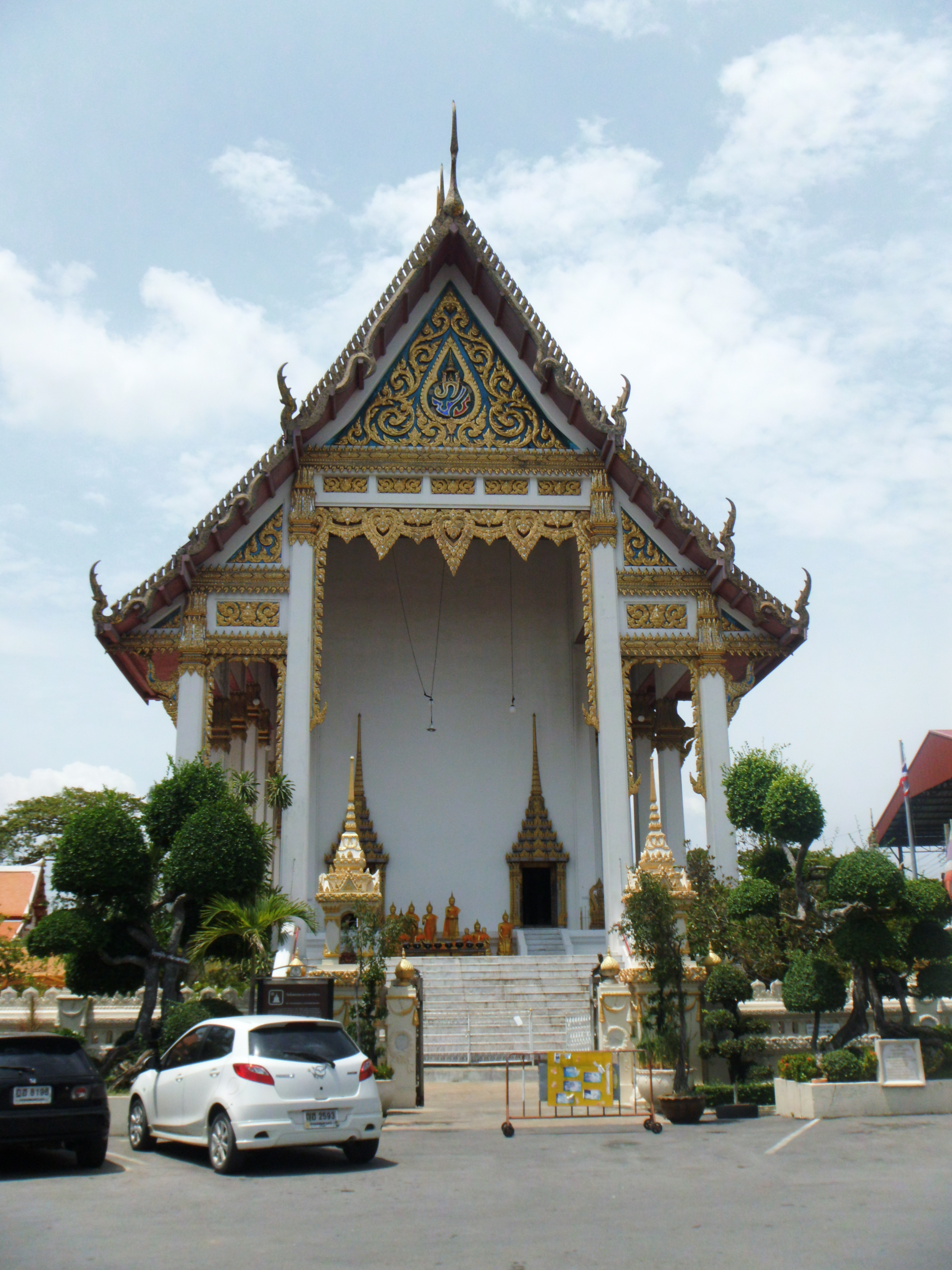
Façade of the new ordination hall

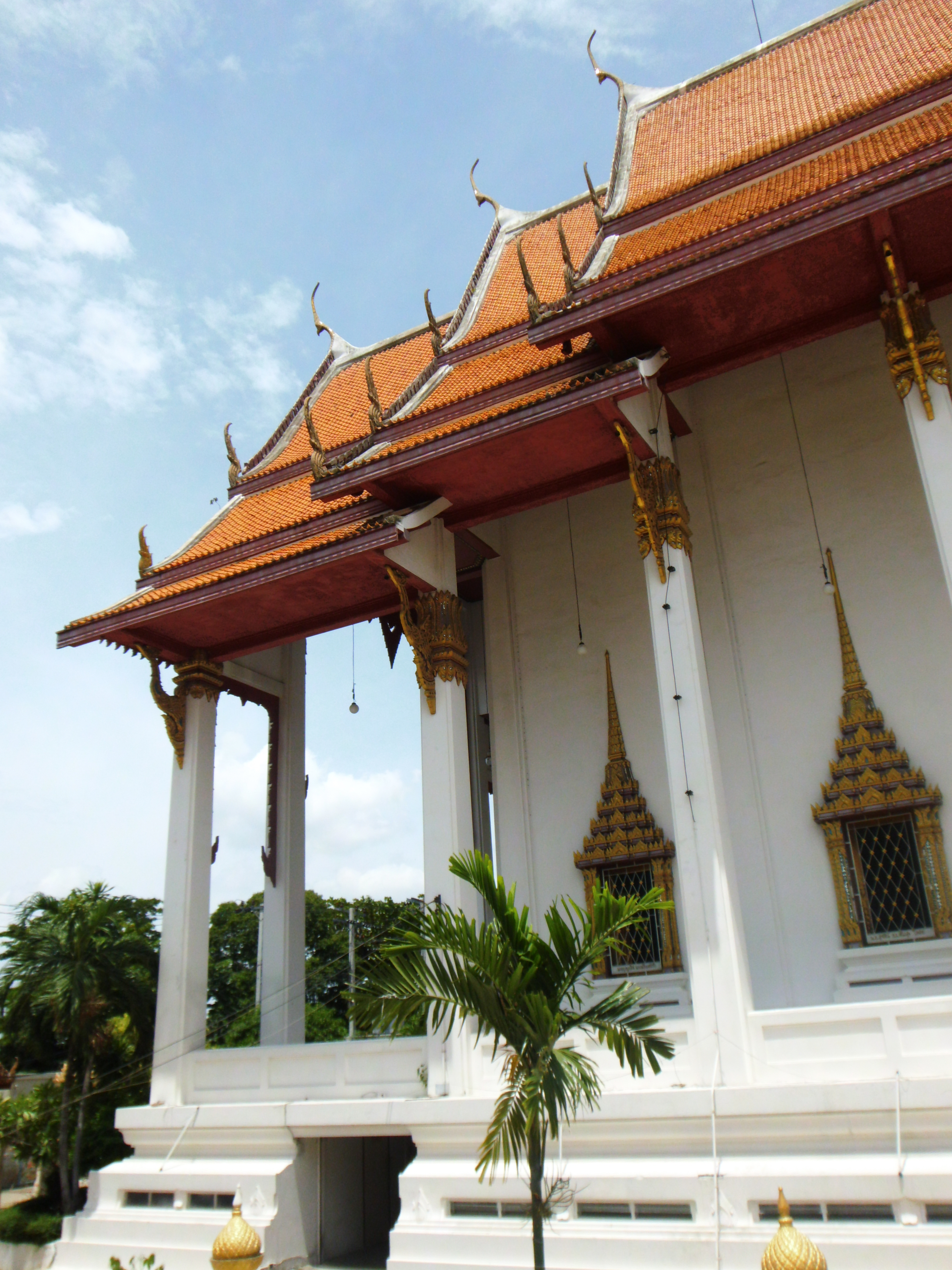
Beside new ordination hall
