= Taling Chan, Saraburi =

Coordinates: 14°32′50″N 100°57′40″E

Taling Chan (Thai: ตลิ่งชัน, pronounced [tā.lìŋ t͡ɕʰān]) is a tambon (sub-district) of Mueang Saraburi District, Saraburi Province, central Thailand.

== History ==
The area previously known as "Ban Nong Bua" (บ้านหนองบัว, "lotus pond village"). The name Taling Chan is a name given by the King Rama V, when he visited the people along the connected rivers. Locals built the pavilion for the king on a boulder. Hence, the name "Taling Chan" (steep bank) according to the terrain.

== Geography ==
Most of the subdistrict consists of lowlands along the Pasak River, therefore suitable for agriculture.

Neighbouring areas consists of (from north clockwise): Ban Kaeng in Chaloem Phra Kiat, Tan Diao in Kaeng Khoi, Kut Nok Plao and Takut in its district.

Taling Chan is about 7 km (4.3 mi) from the city of Saraburi. Taling Chan has a total area of 26.516 square kilometers (16,572.50 rais).

== Administration ==
The area is administered by the Subdistrict Administrative Organization (SAO) Taling Chan (องค์การบริหารส่วนตำบลตลิ่งชัน).

Taling Chan also consists of eight administrative villages (muban)

| No. | Name | Thai |
|---|---|---|
| 1. | Ban Tha Yiam | บ้านท่าเยี่ยม |
| 2. | Ban Talat Nong Bua | บ้านตลาดหนองบัว |
| 3. | Ban Kok Na Fai | บ้านกอกนาฝาย |
| 4. | Ban Nong Krung | บ้านหนองกรุง |
| 5. | Ban Huai Li | บ้านห้วยลี่ |
| 6. | Ban Taling Chan | บ้านตลิ่งชัน |
| 7. | Ban Nong Bua | บ้านหนองบัว |
| 8. | Ban Chao Ek | บ้านเจ้าเอก |

== Demography ==
Total population of 4,590 people (2,288 men, and 2,302 women) in 1,840 households.

== Economy ==
Most Taling Chan residents work in employees, minority are agriculturists and traders.

== Transportation ==
Mittraphap Road (Highway 2) runs through the area for a distance of about 3 km (1.9 mi). Taling Chan is served by the Nong Bua Railway Station of the State Railway of Thailand (SRT), whose Northeastern Railway runs pass the area.

== Places ==
- Wat Taling Chan Temple
- Saraburi Provincial Transport Office
- Robinson Lifestyle Saraburi
- Makro Saraburi
