= Khlong Maha Sawat =

Canal in Bangkok, Thailand

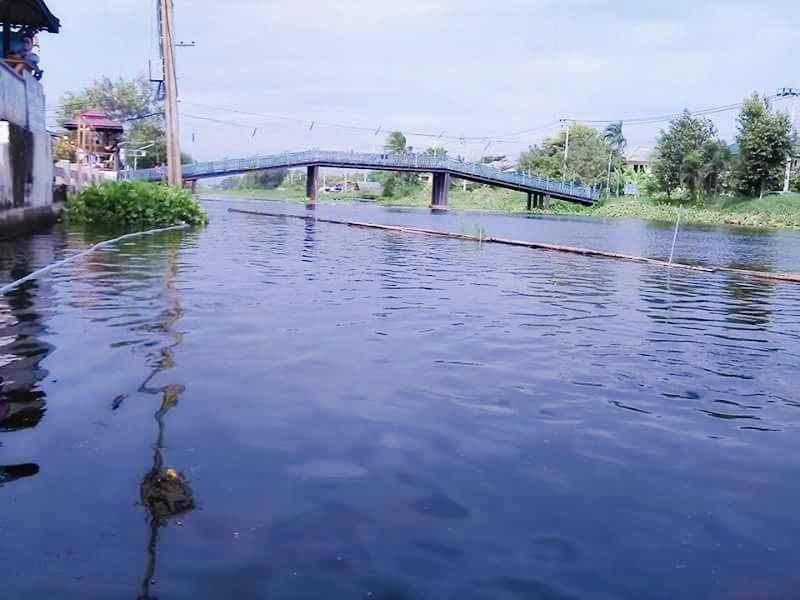
- Khlong Maha Sawat
- Interactive map of Khlong Maha Sawat

Specifications
- Length: 28 km (17 miles)

History
- Construction began: 13 September 1859
- Date completed: 1 May 1860

Geography
- Start point: Nonthaburi
- End point: Nakhon Pathom
- Connects to: Khlong Lat Bang Kruai, Tha Chin River

Khlong Maha Sawat (Thai: คลองมหาสวัสดิ์, pronounced [kʰlɔ̄ːŋ mā.hǎː sā.wàt]), also known as Khlong Chaiyaphruek (คลองชัยพฤกษ์, pronounced [kʰlɔ̄ːŋ t͡ɕʰāj.jā.pʰrɯ́k]), is a khlong (canal) in Thailand. It is a man-made waterway dug in 1859–1860 in the reign of King Rama IV. Today it is listed by the Fine Arts Department as a national heritage site. It starts from Khlong Lat Bang Kruai (Khlong Bangkok Noi) near Wat Chaiyaphrueksamala, flows along the border of Nonthaburi's Bang Kruai with Taling Chan and Thawi Watthana of suburban Bangkok, then flows through Phutthamonthon to meet the Tha Chin River at Ngio Rai Subdistrict in Nakhon Pathom's Nakhon Chai Si District. Its length is 28 km (17 mi). Note: Khlong Maha Sawat and Khlong Prapa Maha Sawat are two different canals.

== History ==
Connecting Bangkok Noi Canal and the Tha Chin (Nakhon Chaisi) River, the 28 kilometre-long Maha Sawat Canal was created as a shortcut to Phra Pathom Chedi and to open up land on both banks to agriculture. In 1852, King Rama IV ordered the restoration of Phra Pathom Chedi and assigned Somdej Chao Phraya Maha Prayoonrawong and his son, Chao Phraya Thipakornwong Maha Kosathibodi (Kham Bunnag), to supervise the digging of the Chedi Bucha and Maha Sawat canals. Chinese labourers dug the canal. They began on 13 September 1859 and finished on 1 May 1860. The cost was around 80,000 baht. The completed canal gave ready access to 20,000 rai (32 km^{2}) of new farmland.

A new bridge over the canal connecting Taling Chan District of Bangkok with Bang Kruai District of Nonthaburi Province, opened in March 2020, has drawn the ire of some locals. It is alleged that the bridge, built by a private real estate company named Asian Property (Krungthep) Co, Ltd., is too low to allow the passage of tourist boats at high tide.
