= Phutthamonthon district =

Phutthamonthon พุทธมณฑล
- District
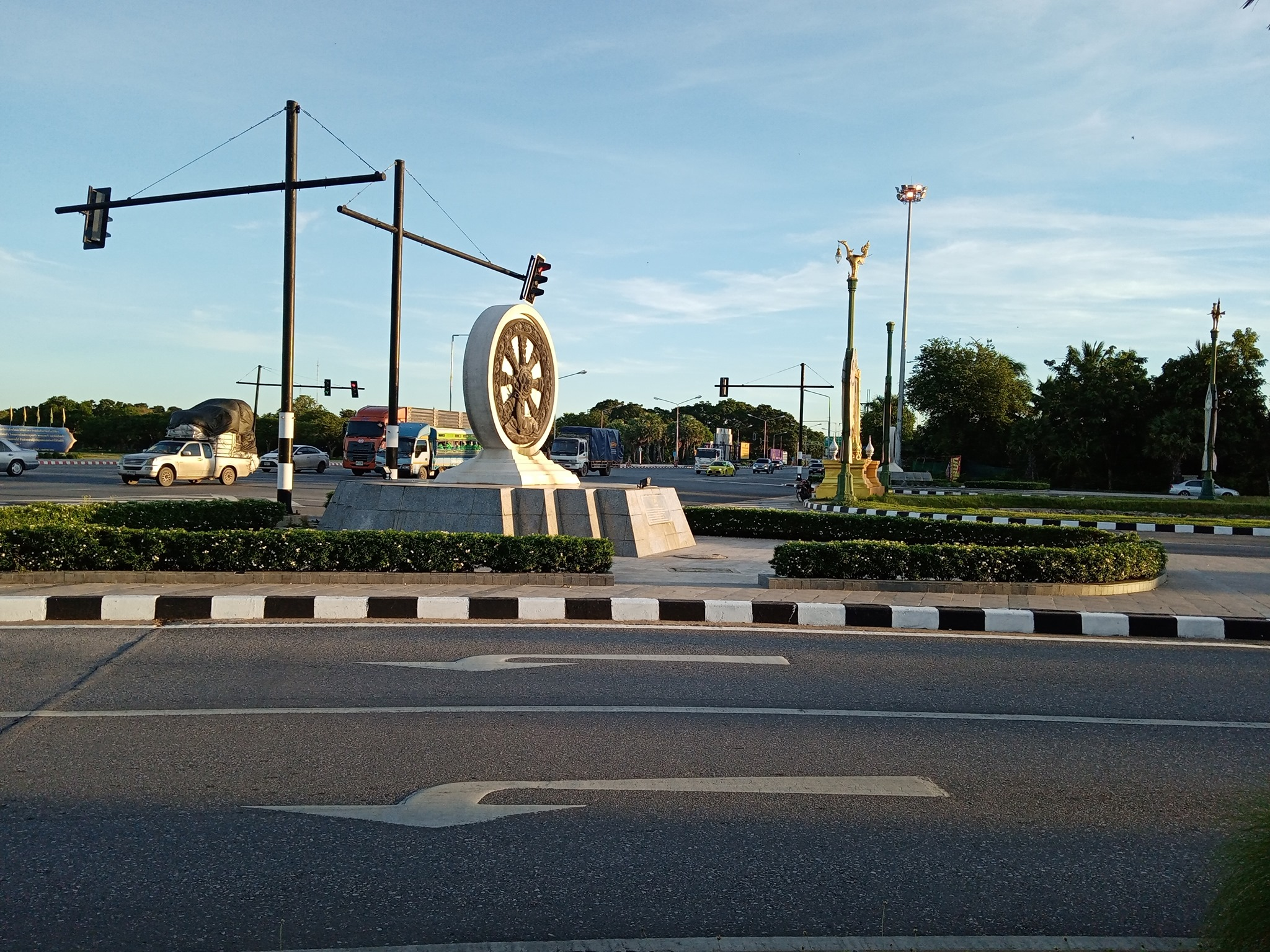
- The starting of Utthayan Road, also widely known as Aksa Road (axis road) in the area of Phutthamonthon, where it meets Phutthamonthon Sai 4 Road

- District location in Nakhon Pathom province
- Coordinates: 13°48′7″N 100°19′18″E
- Country: Thailand
- Province: Nakhon Pathom
- Seat: Sala Ya

Area
  - Total: 52.3 km^{2} (20.2 sq mi)

Population (2017)
  - Total: 40,463
  - Density: 773.67/km^{2} (2,003.8/sq mi)
- Time zone: UTC+7 (ICT)
- Postal code: 73170
- Geocode: 7307

Phutthamonthon (Thai: พุทธมณฑล, pronounced [pʰút.tʰā.mōn.tʰōn]) is a district (amphoe) in the east of Nakhon Pathom province, central Thailand.

== Geography ==
Neighbouring districts are (from the north clockwise): Bang Len; the districts Sai Noi, Bang Yai and Bang Kruai of Nonthaburi province; the district Thawi Watthana of Bangkok, and Sam Phran and Nakhon Chai Si.

== History ==
The minor district (king amphoe) was created on 1 April 1991, when three tambon were split off from Nakhon Chai Si district. It was upgraded to a full district on 5 December 1996.

== Buildings ==
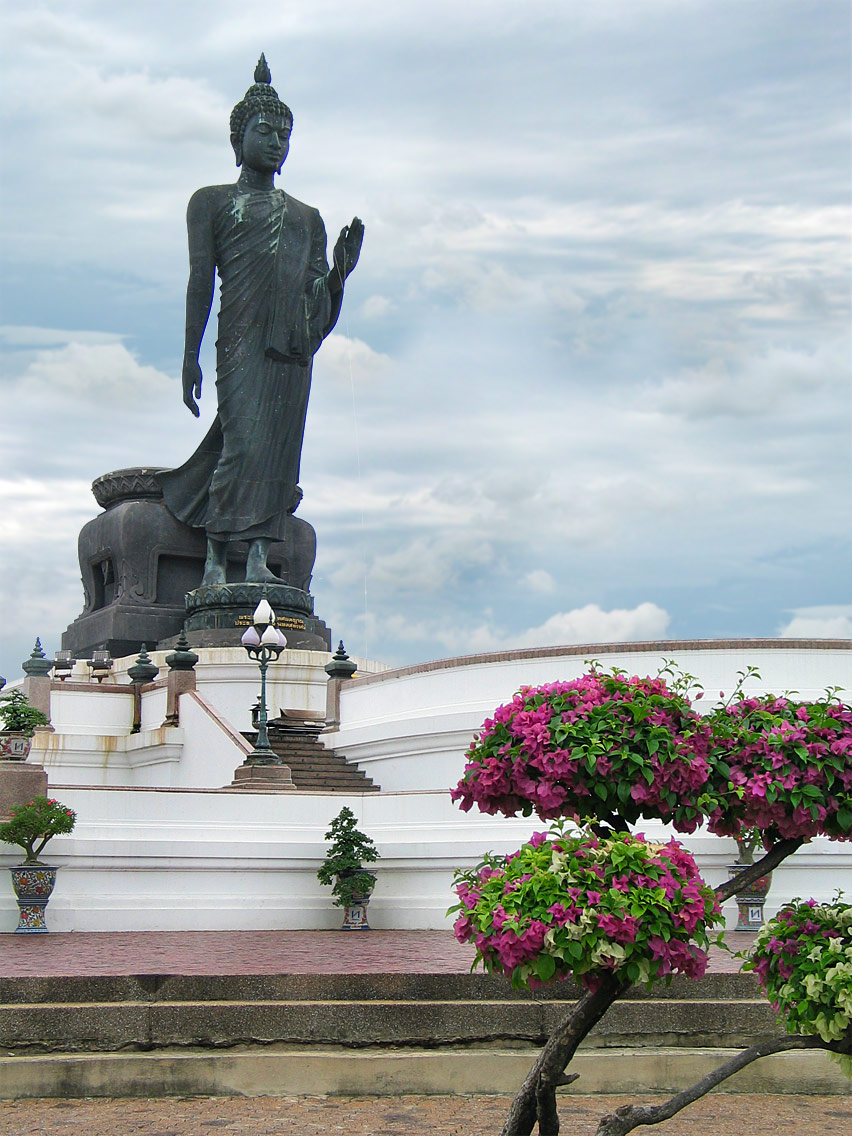
Phutthamonthon

The most important building in the district is the Phutthamonthon park, a 40 hectare Buddhist park. The district was named after the park. Its name means "Mandala of the Buddha".

One of the three campuses of Mahidol University is also in Salaya.

== Administration ==
The district is divided into three subdistricts (tambons), which are further subdivided into 18 villages (mubans). Salaya has township (thesaban tambon) status and covers parts of tambon Salaya. Each of the tambon is administered by a tambon administrative organization (TAO).

No.	Name	Thai name	Villages	Population
1.	Salaya	ศาลายา	6	15,845
2.	Khlong Yong	คลองโยง	8	7,157
3.	Maha Sawat	มหาสวัสดิ์	4	5,273
