= Hellfire Pass =

War memorial in Thailand

- ช่องเขาขาด
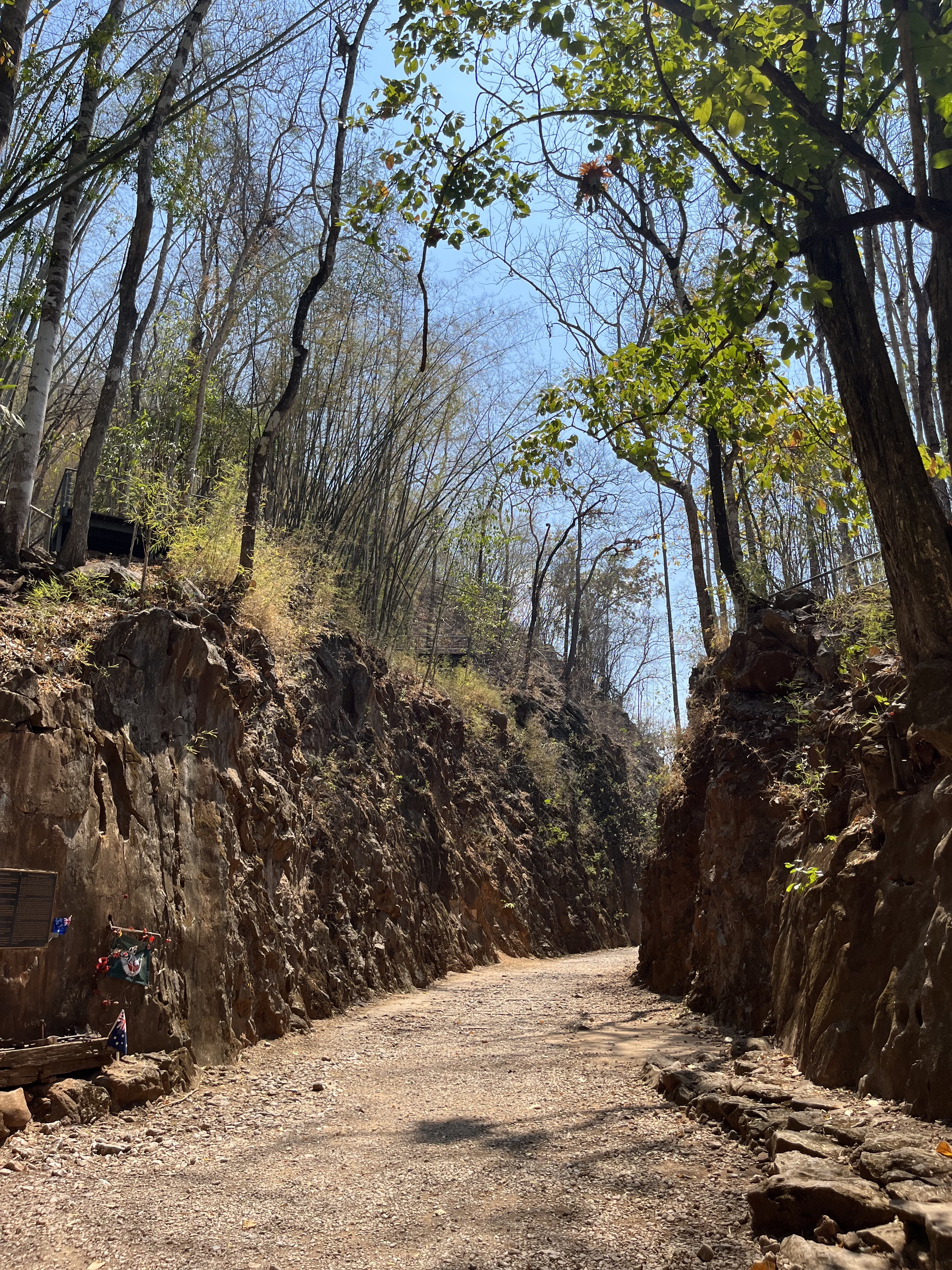
- A portion of Hellfire Pass in 2023

- Hellfire Pass in Kanchanaburi Province, Thailand
- Established: 24 April 1996
- Location: Kanchanaburi Province, Thailand
- Coordinates: 14°21′19″N 98°57′09″E
- Type: War memorial, nature trail and abandoned railway line
- Curator: Office of Australian War Graves/Royal Thai Armed Forces
- Public transit access: Nam Tok Sai Yok Noi railway station (18 km (11 mi) away)

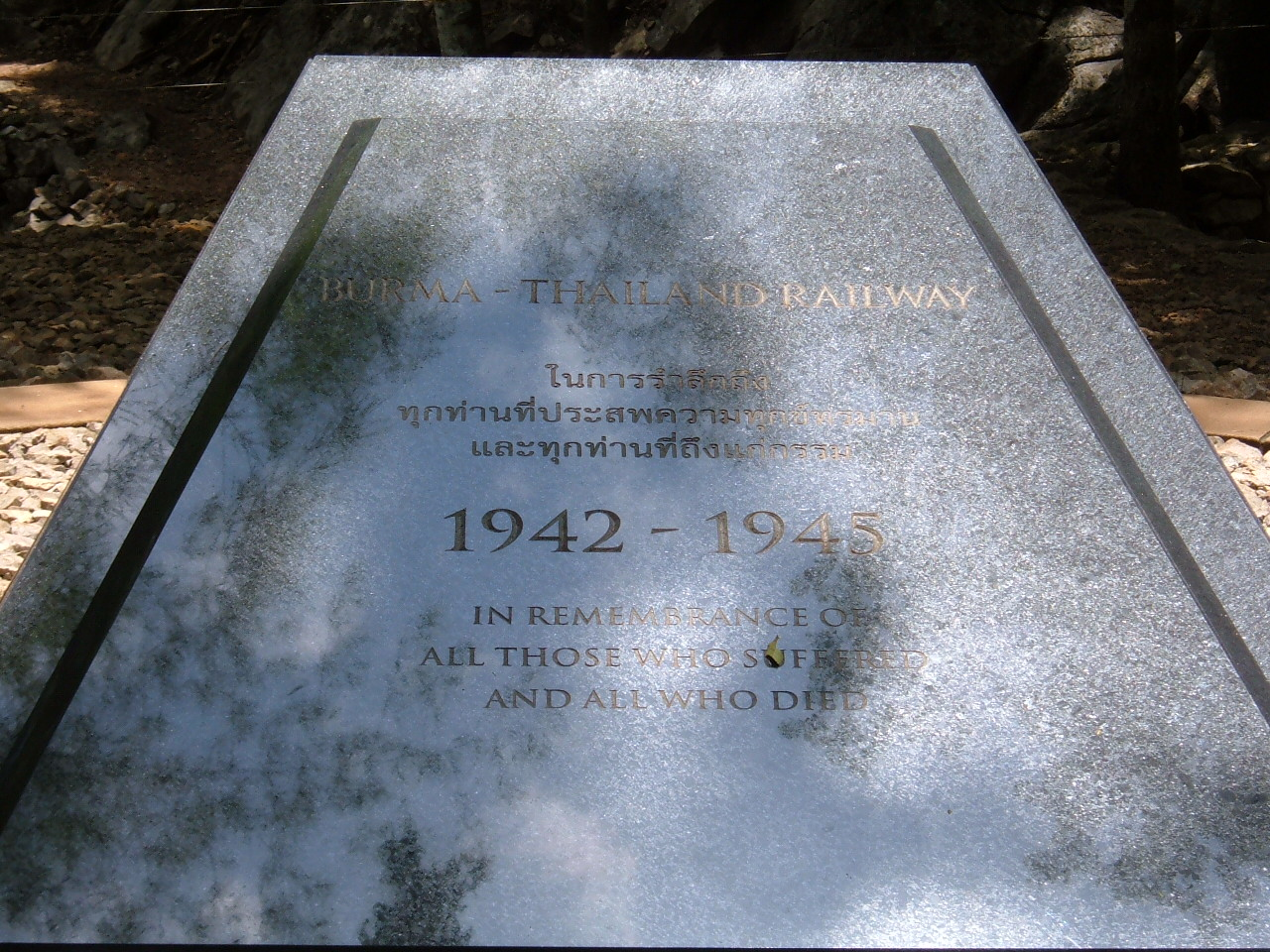
The Australian memorial in the cutting

Hellfire Pass, known locally as Chong Khao Kard (Thai: ช่องเขาขาด, lit. "Torn Valley Pass") and in Japanese as Konyu Cutting, is the name of a railway cutting on the former Burma Railway ("Death Railway") in Thailand, which was built with forced labour during World War II. More than 250,000 Southeast Asian civilians and 12,000 Allied soldiers built the railway line, including Hellfire Pass. The pass is noted for the harsh conditions and heavy loss of life suffered by its labourers during construction. It was called Hellfire Pass because the sight of emaciated prisoners labouring by burning torchlight resembled a scene from Hell.

== History ==
Hellfire Pass in the Tenasserim Hills was a particularly difficult section of the line to build, a dramatic cutting some 75 metres long and 25 metres deep. It was the largest rock cutting on the railway, coupled with its general remoteness and the lack of proper construction tools during building. A tunnel would have been possible to build instead of a cutting, but this could only be constructed at the two ends at any one time, whereas the cutting could be constructed at all points simultaneously despite the excess effort required by the prisoners of war (POWs). The Australian, British, Dutch and other allied prisoners of war were required by the Japanese to work 18 hours a day to complete the cutting. Sixty-nine men were beaten to death by Japanese guards in the six weeks it took to build the cutting, and many more died from cholera, dysentery, starvation, and exhaustion (Wigmore 568). However, the majority of deaths occurred amongst civilian labourers, whom the Japanese enticed to come to help build the line with false promises of good jobs. These labourers, mostly Malayans (Chinese, Malays and Tamils from Malaya), suffered mostly the same as the POWs at the hands of the Japanese.

The railway was never built to a level of lasting permanence and was frequently bombed by the Royal Air Force during the Burma Campaign. After the war, all but the present section was closed and the line is now only in service between Bangkok and Nam Tok Sai Yok Noi.

=== Present day ===
There are no longer any trains running on this stretch of the line. The nearest railway station is at Nam Tok Sai Yok Noi, where trains of the State Railway of Thailand can be taken for a trip over the Wang Pho Viaduct and across the bridge over the River Kwai to Kanchanaburi, which is the nearest major town and tourist base. Visitors to the site usually base themselves in Kanchanaburi.

== Historical preservation and museum ==
The Hellfire Pass Memorial Museum and the preservation of the Hellfire Pass itself had its origins in 1983, when former POW J.G. (Tom) Morris toured the area in Thailand and resolved to convince the Australian Government that portions of the Thai-Burma Death Railway should be preserved as a historical site. Thanks to his efforts, the Snowy Mountains Engineering Corporation (SMEC) was commissioned in 1984 to make a survey of the railway to choose a suitable site. Jim Appleby, a SMEC engineer at the Khao Laem dam site on the upper Kwai Noi, did much of the ground work and passed his reports to the Australian-Thai Chamber of Commerce in 1985.

The first dawn service was held at the Hellfire Pass on Anzac Day 1990. The museum is co-sponsored by the Royal Thai Armed Forces Development Command and the Australian government to commemorate the suffering of those involved in the construction of the railway. It was built by the Office of Australian War Graves and opened by the then Prime Minister of Australia, John Howard.

Renovated in 2018, the Hellfire Pass Interpretive Centre provides information and exhibits about the construction of the Death Railway, and the suffering and sacrifices endured during its construction. The museum includes multimedia displays, artifacts, and a memorial to those who lost their lives. As a part of the museum experience, it is possible to walk through the cutting itself and along a section of the former railway track bed. An audio tour, including recorded memories of surviving POWs, is available at the centre.

== Recent developments ==
In 2006, proposals to create a railway network linking eight south-east Asia countries would see a railway link restored between Thailand and Myanmar. It is not clear if this would follow the original Death Railway route through Hellfire Pass, since this route was necessarily built quickly and to low standard of curves and gradients.

== Hintok ==
Hintok (Thai: หินตก, lit. "Falling rock") (also: Hintock) was an area just beyond Hellfire Pass. It was the beginning of the highlands, and the railway line needed a gradual gradient to climb. There were four camps: the river camp, which was subdivided into British, Australian and Tamil camps; and the mountain camp, which housed Australian, British and Dutch prisoners. The mountain camp was commanded by Weary Dunlop, and had a bamboo fence to protect against tigers.

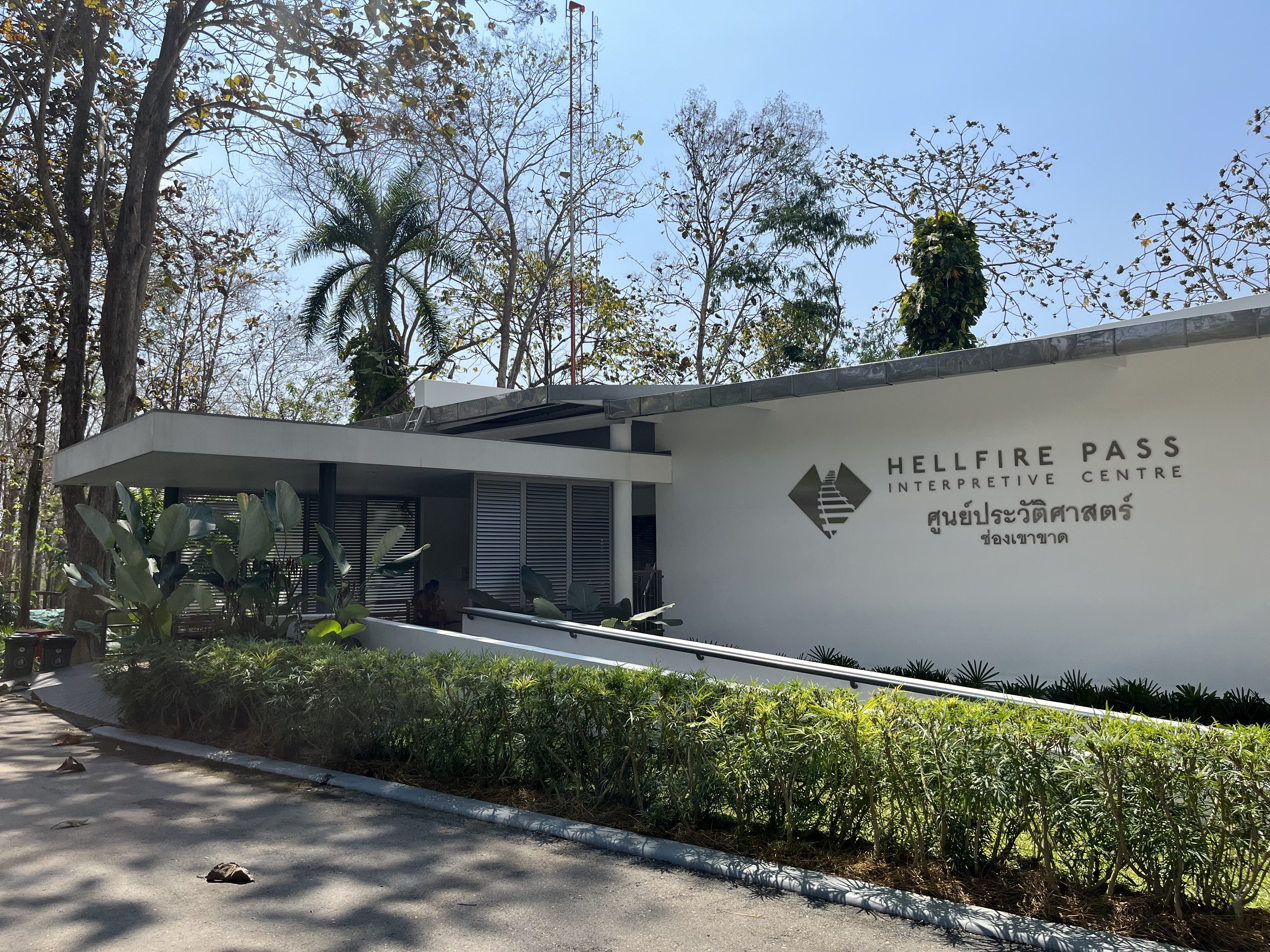
Hellfire Pass Interpretive Centre in 2023

The first prisoners arrived on 26 January 1943 and were tasked to clear the forest and construct the camps. By March 1943, there were 800 prisoners in the camps. Beyond the Hellfire Pass was the Three-Tiered Bridge, a trestle bridge to gain height, followed by another 400-metre-long and 25-metre-high trestle bridge which was later named the Pack of Cards Bridge because it collapsed three times during construction, and was later abandoned in favour of an embankment.

On 19 June 1943, there was an outbreak of cholera at the Hintok mountain camp, killing 57 Australian prisoners. 31 prisoners died during the Pack of Cards Bridge's collapses, and 29 died from guard brutality. 130 sick prisoners were sent to Tarsao. Construction of the bridges was finished in August 1943. The Three-Tiered Bridge was often photographed after the war, but is now lost in the jungle.

== Additional images ==
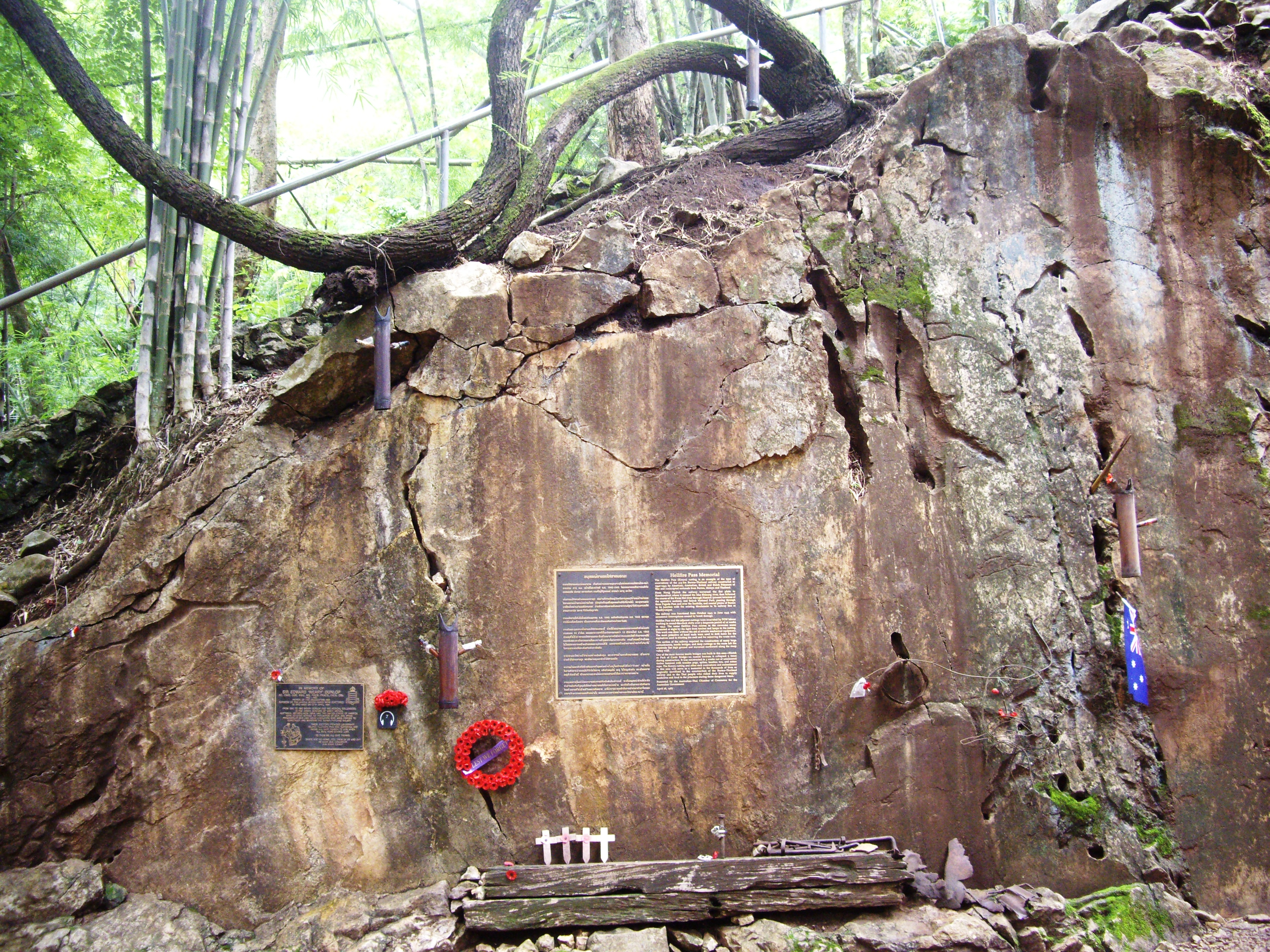
Hellfire Pass memorial plaque

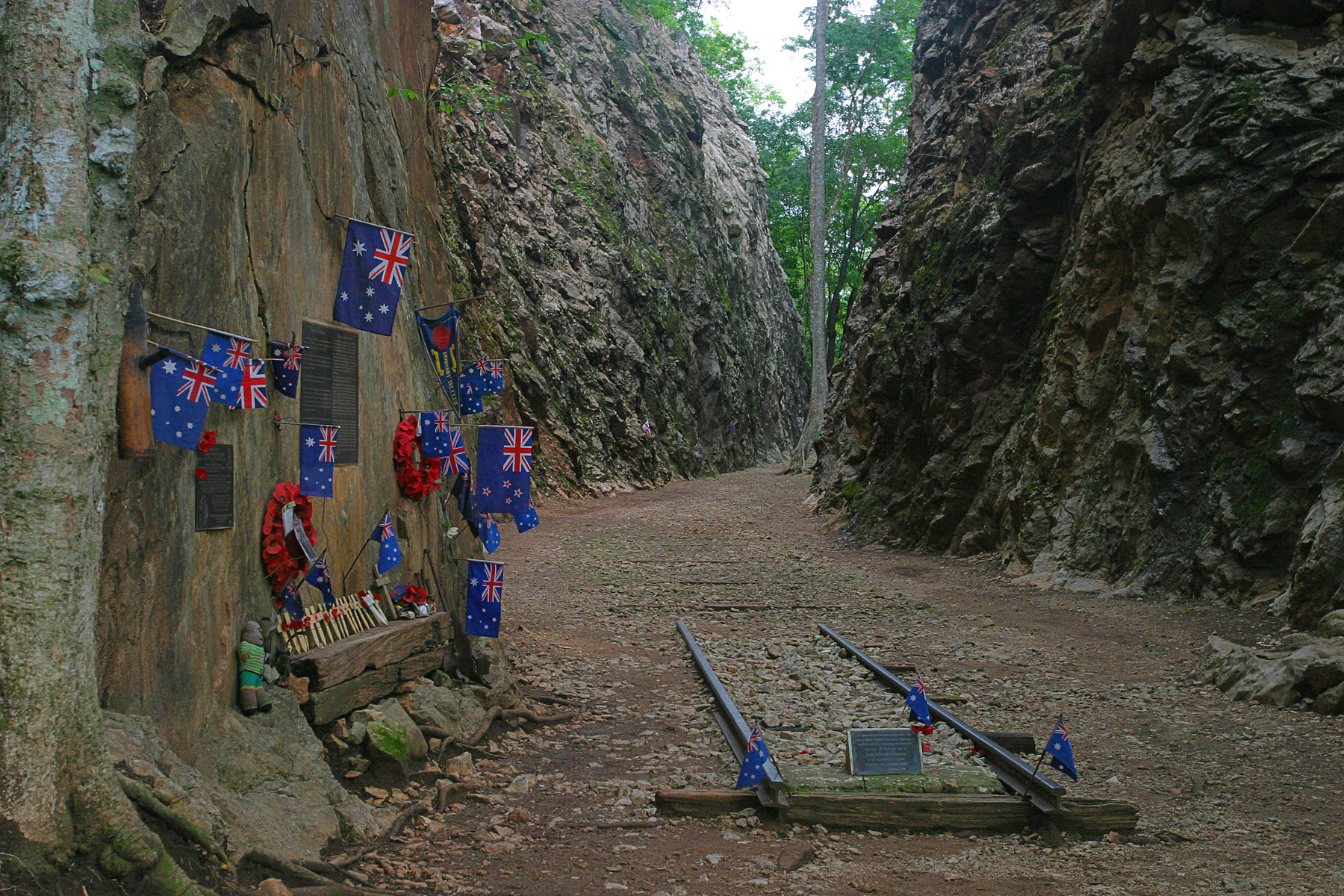
Australian and New Zealand flags left by visitors at the memorial

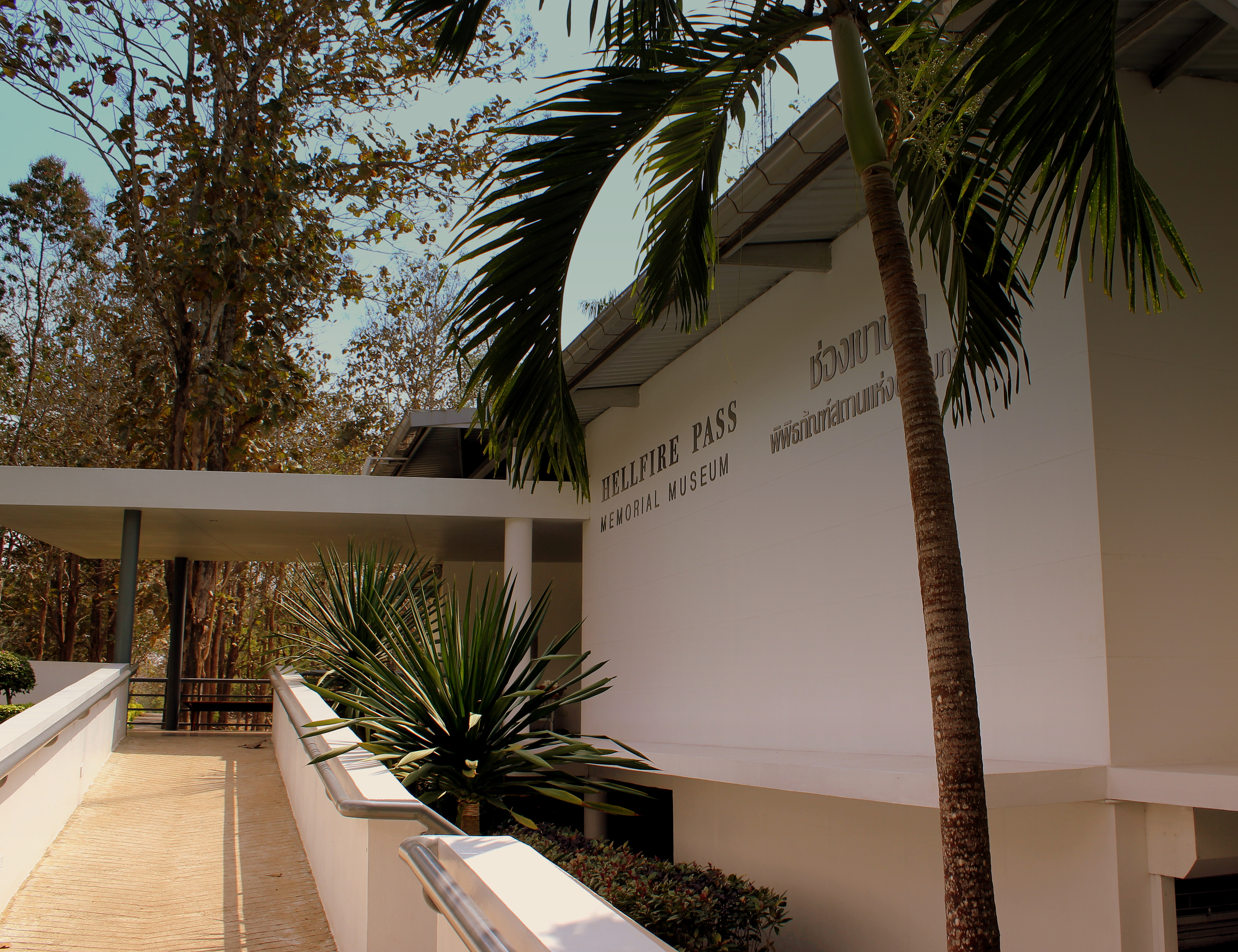
The old museum in 2013

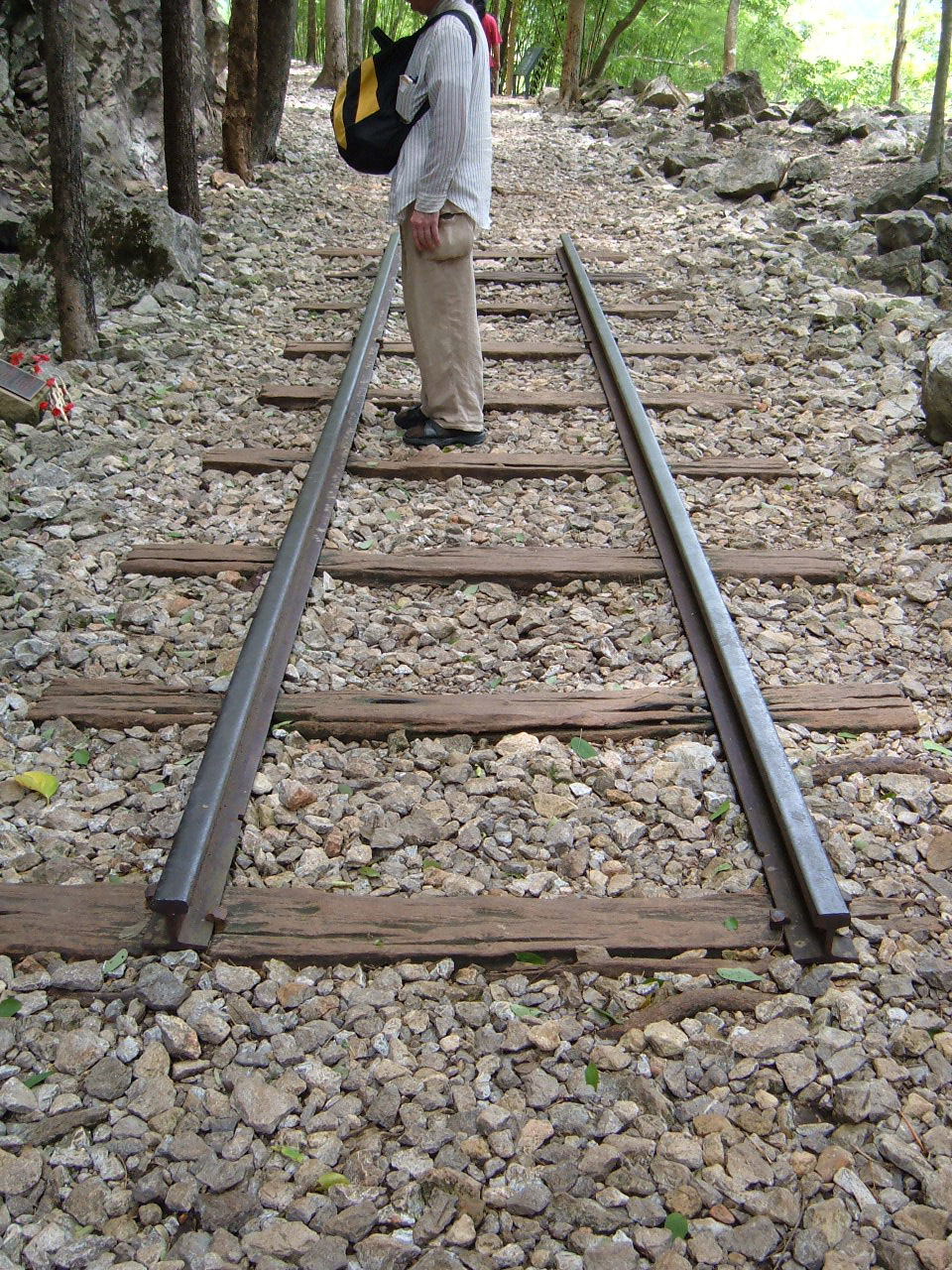
A portion of rail at the Hellfire Pass

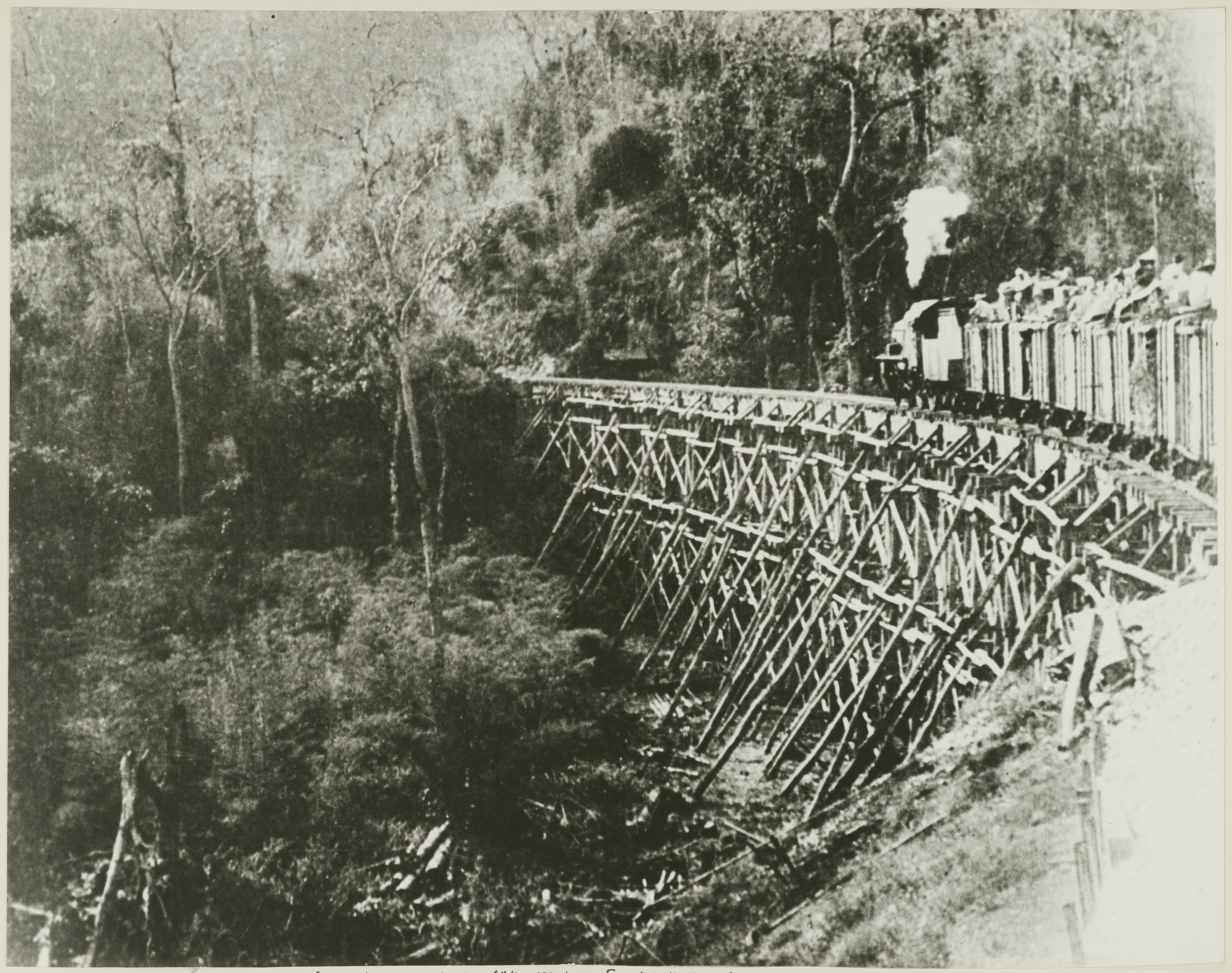
Three-Tiered Bridge
