= Burma Railway =

WWII Japanese Thai–Burma railway

Coordinates: 14°02′27″N 99°30′11″E

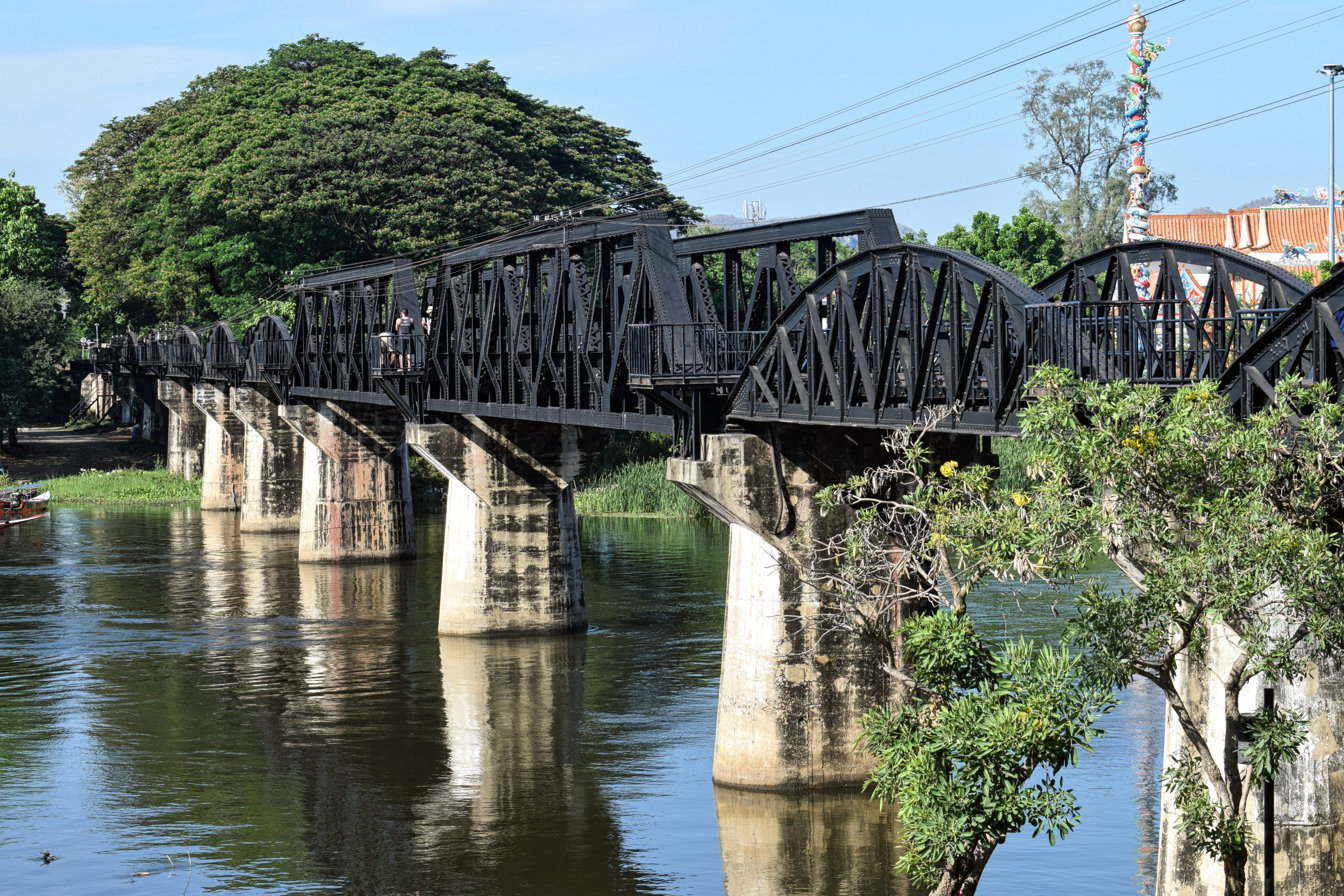
- The railway bridge over the Khwae Yai River in Kanchanaburi Province, Thailand.

Overview
- Other name(s): Death Railway; Nam Tok Line; Siam–Burma Railway; Thai–Burma Railway
- Native name: ทางรถไฟสายมรณะ (Thai) 泰緬連接鉄道 (Japanese)
- Locale: Ban Pong, Thailand to Thanbyuzayat, Burma
- Termini: Nong Pladuk Junction; Nam Tok Sai Yok Noi
- Former connections: Nam Tok Sai Yok Noi–Thanbyuzayat

Service
- Type: Heavy rail
- Operator: State Railway of Thailand

History
- Work began: 1942–1947
- Opened: 25 October 1943
- Built by: Prisoners of war and civilian laborers
- Closed: 1 February 1947
- Reopened: 1 July 1958 (Nong Pladuk–Nam Tok)

Technical
- Line length: 415 km (258 mi)
- Track gauge: 1,000 mm (3 ft 3 3/8 in) metre gauge

The Burma Railway, also known as the Siam–Burma Railway, Thai–Burma Railway and similar names, or locally as the Death Railway (Thai: ทางรถไฟสายมรณะ), is a 415 km (258 mi) railway between Ban Pong, Thailand, and Thanbyuzayat, Burma (now Myanmar). It was built from 1940 to 1943 by abducted Southeast Asian civilians and captured Allied soldiers forced to work by the Japanese, to supply troops and weapons in the Burma campaign of World War II. It completed the rail link between Bangkok, Thailand, and Rangoon, Burma. The name used by the Imperial Japanese Government was Tai–Men Rensetsu Tetsudō (泰緬連接鉄道), which means Thailand-Burma-Link-Railway.

At least 250,000 Southeast Asian civilians were subjected to forced labour to ensure the construction of the Death Railway and more than 90,000 civilians died building it, as did around 12,000 Allied soldiers. The workers on the Thai side of the railway were Tamils, Malays, and fewer Chinese civilians from Malaya. Most workers were moved to 'rest camps' after October 1943. They remained in these after the end of the war as they watched the Allied prisoners of war being evacuated. Survivors were still living in the camps in 1947. They were British subjects who, without access to food or medical care, continued to die of malaria, dysentery and malnutrition.

In general, although some reparations were paid to some independent countries, no compensation or reparations have been provided to the Southeast Asian laborers. Some has been provided to the Allied POWs, although the situation is complex. Japan signed a treaty and offered reparations to the Indonesian and Burmese governments, and the Allies (excluding the Soviet Union) provided some compensation to POWs and relinquished further claims from Japan in the Treaty of San Francisco. The 1951 compensation to Allied POWs was seen as lacking; one former POW was given £76. The United Kingdom gave reparations to the 60,000 Allied prisoners of war (the most recent under the Blair government), but not to its colonial subjects.

Most of the railway was dismantled shortly after the war. Only the first 130 kilometres (81 mi) of the line in Thailand remain, with trains still running as far north as Nam Tok.

== History ==
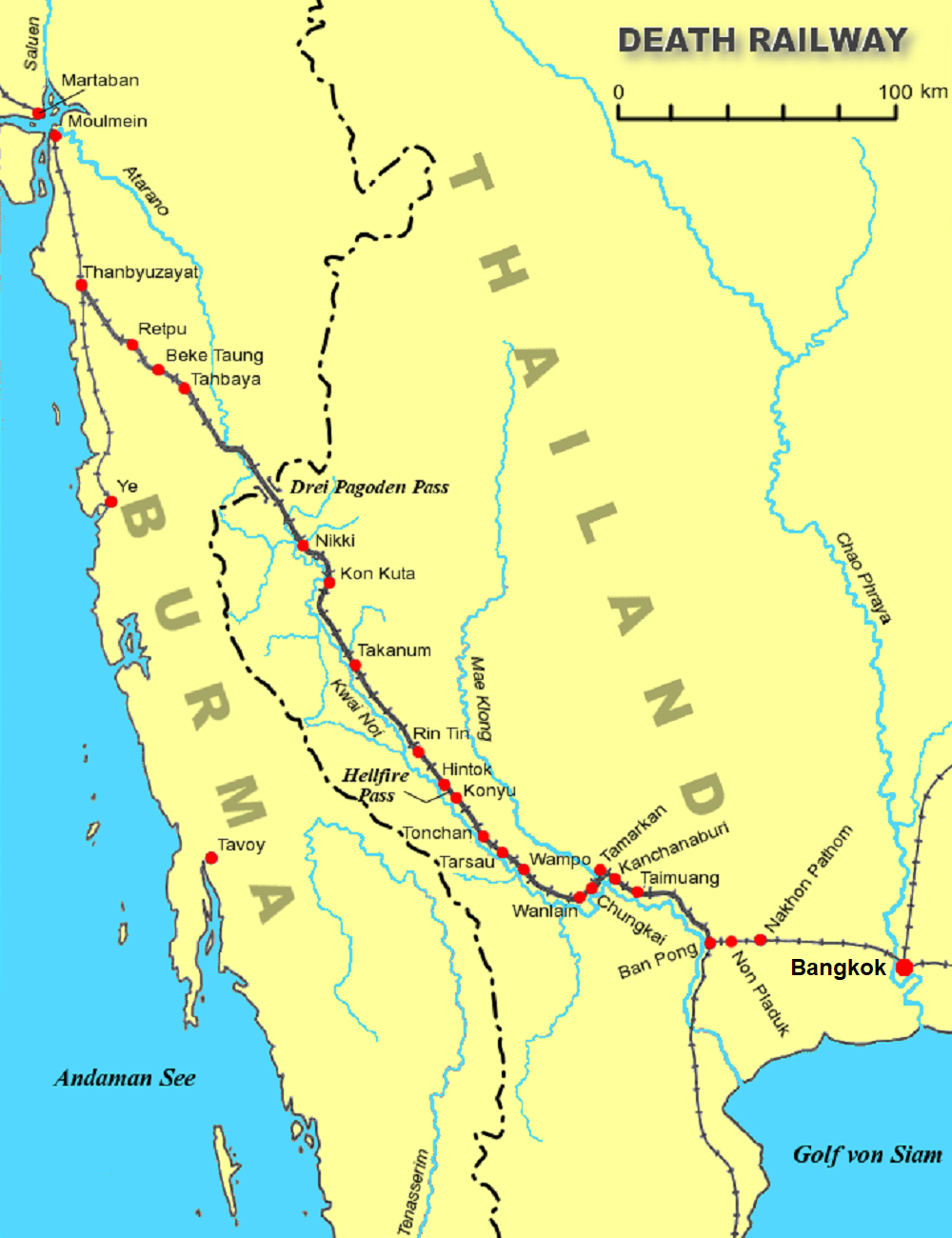
Map of the Death Railway

A railway route between Burma and Thailand, crossing Three Pagodas Pass and following the valley of the Khwae Noi river in Thailand, had been surveyed by the British government of Burma as early as 1885, but the proposed course of the line – through hilly jungle terrain divided by many rivers – was considered too difficult to undertake.

Thailand was a neutral country at the onset of World War II. On 8 December 1941, Japan invaded Thailand, which quickly surrendered. Thailand was forced to accept an alliance, and was used as a staging point for the attack on Singapore.

In early 1942, Japanese forces invaded Burma and British forces quickly surrendered. To supply their forces in Burma, the Japanese depended upon the sea, bringing supplies and troops to Burma around the Malay Peninsula and through the Strait of Malacca and the Andaman Sea. This route was vulnerable to attack by Allied submarines, especially after the Japanese defeat at the Battle of Midway in June 1942. To avoid a hazardous 2,000-mile (3,200 km) sea journey around the Malay Peninsula, a railway from Bangkok to Rangoon seemed a feasible alternative. The Japanese began this project in June 1942.

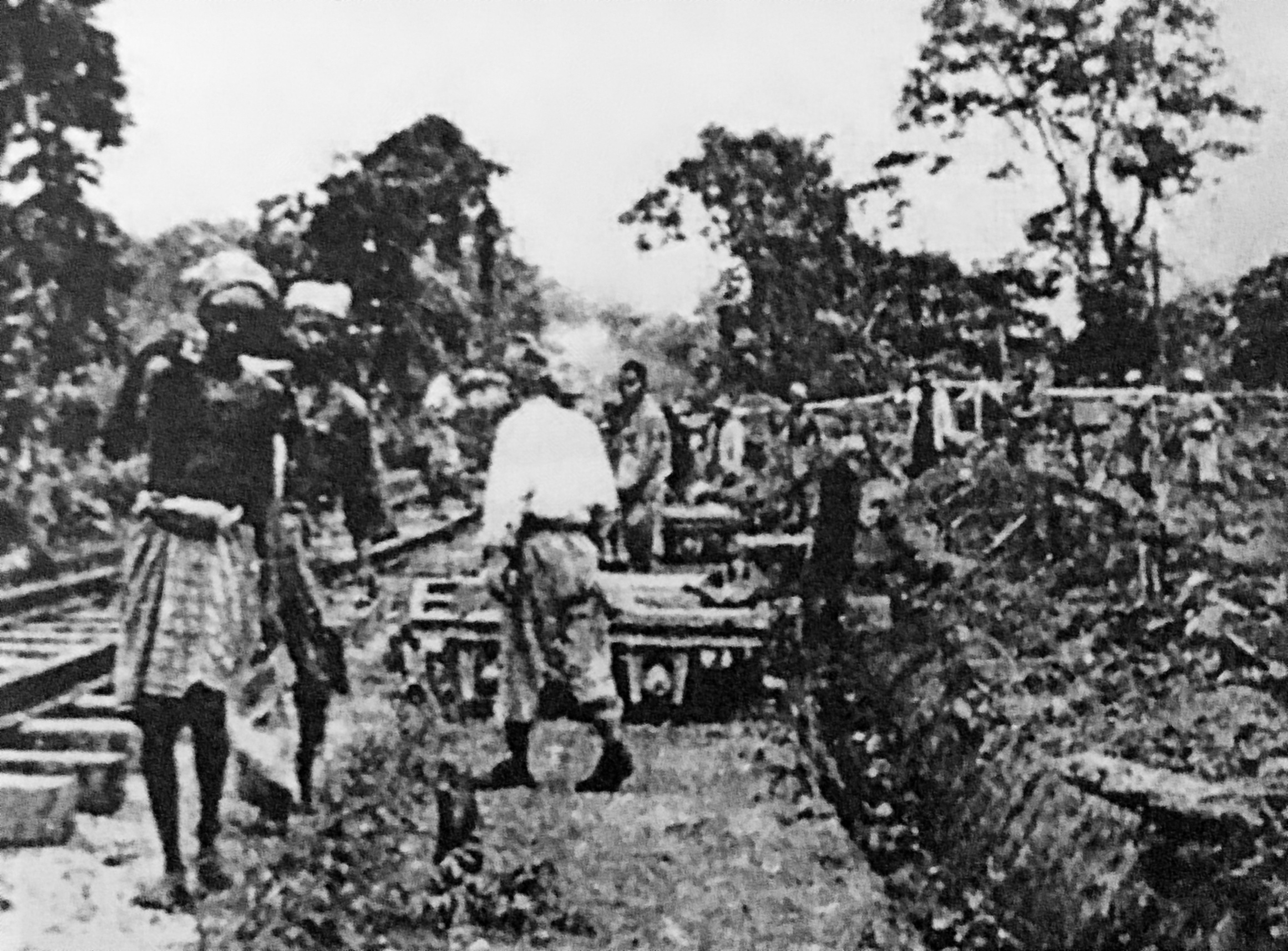
Civilian workers during the construction of the railway between June 1942 and October 1943.

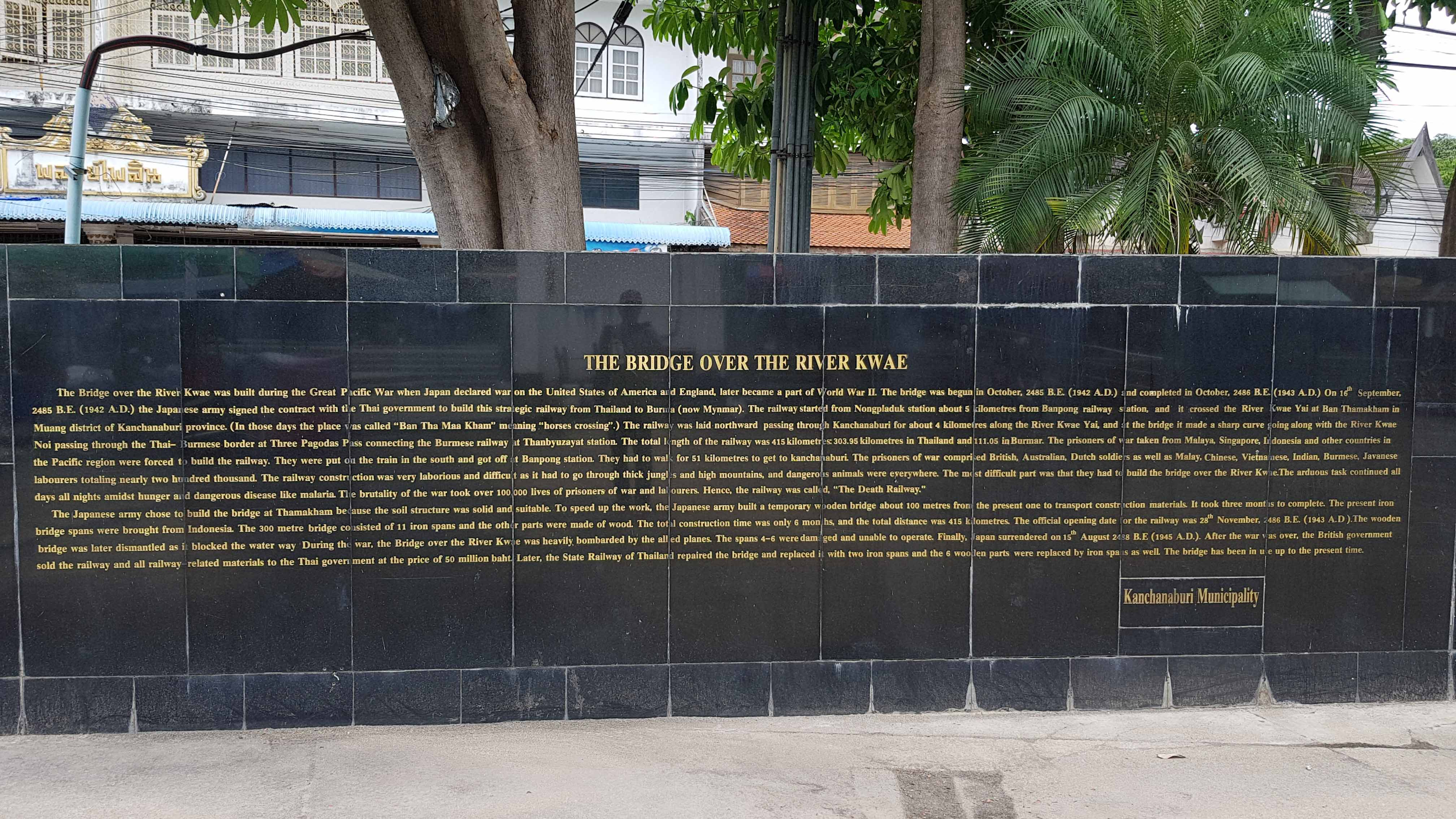
The British government sold the Thai section of the Burma Railway to the Thai government for a total of 50 million baht.

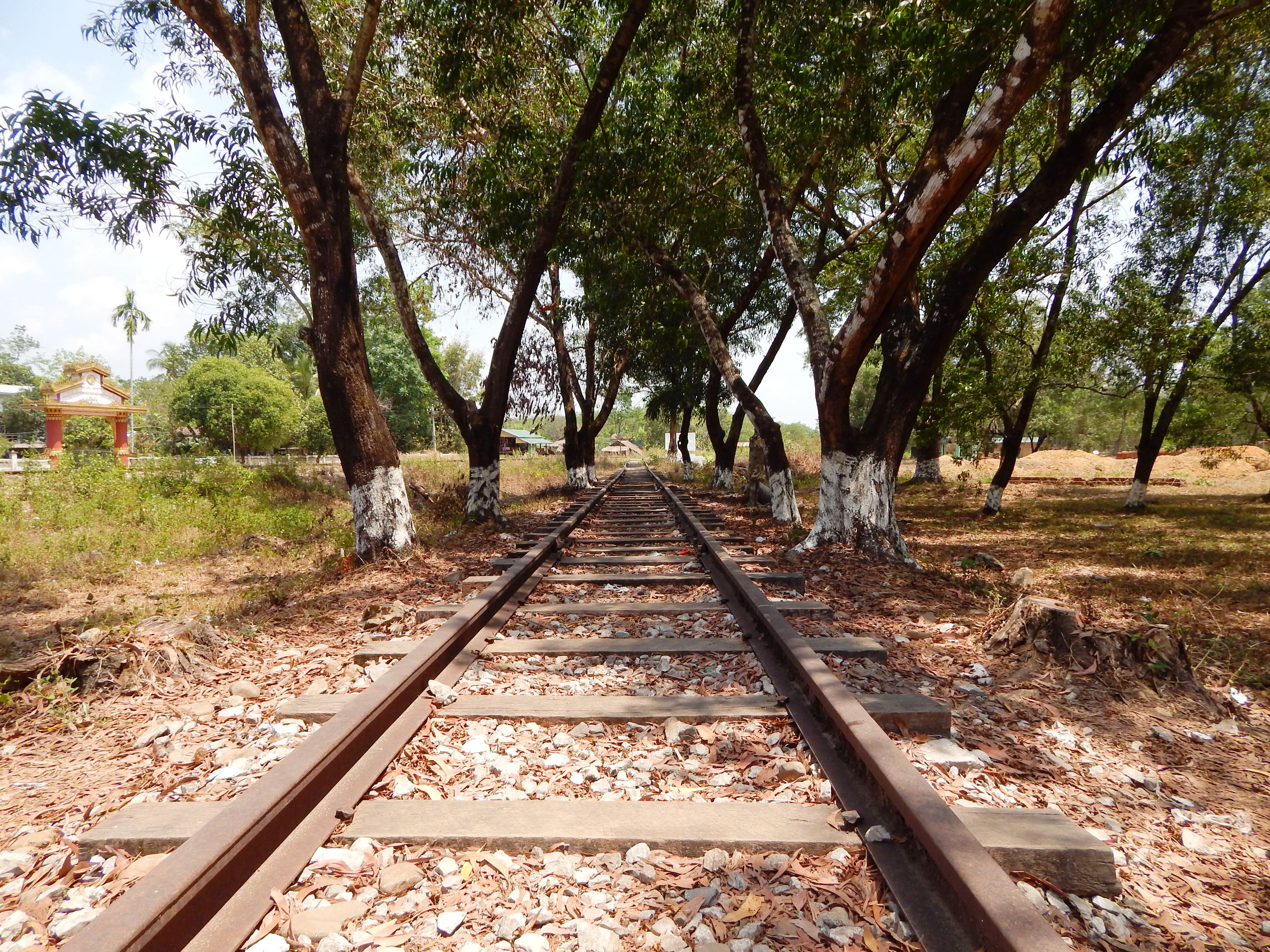
An abandoned section of the Death Railway in Thanbyuzayat, Myanmar (Burma).

The project aimed to connect Ban Pong in Thailand with Thanbyuzayat in Burma, linking up with existing railways at both places. Its route was through Three Pagodas Pass on the border of Thailand and Burma. 69 miles (111 km) of the railway were in Burma and the remaining 189 miles (304 km) were in Thailand. After preliminary work of airfields and infrastructure, construction of the railway began in Burma and Thailand on 16 September 1942. The projected completion date was December 1943. Much of the construction material, including tracks and sleepers, was brought from dismantled branches of Malaya's Federated Malay States Railway network and the East Indies' various rail networks.

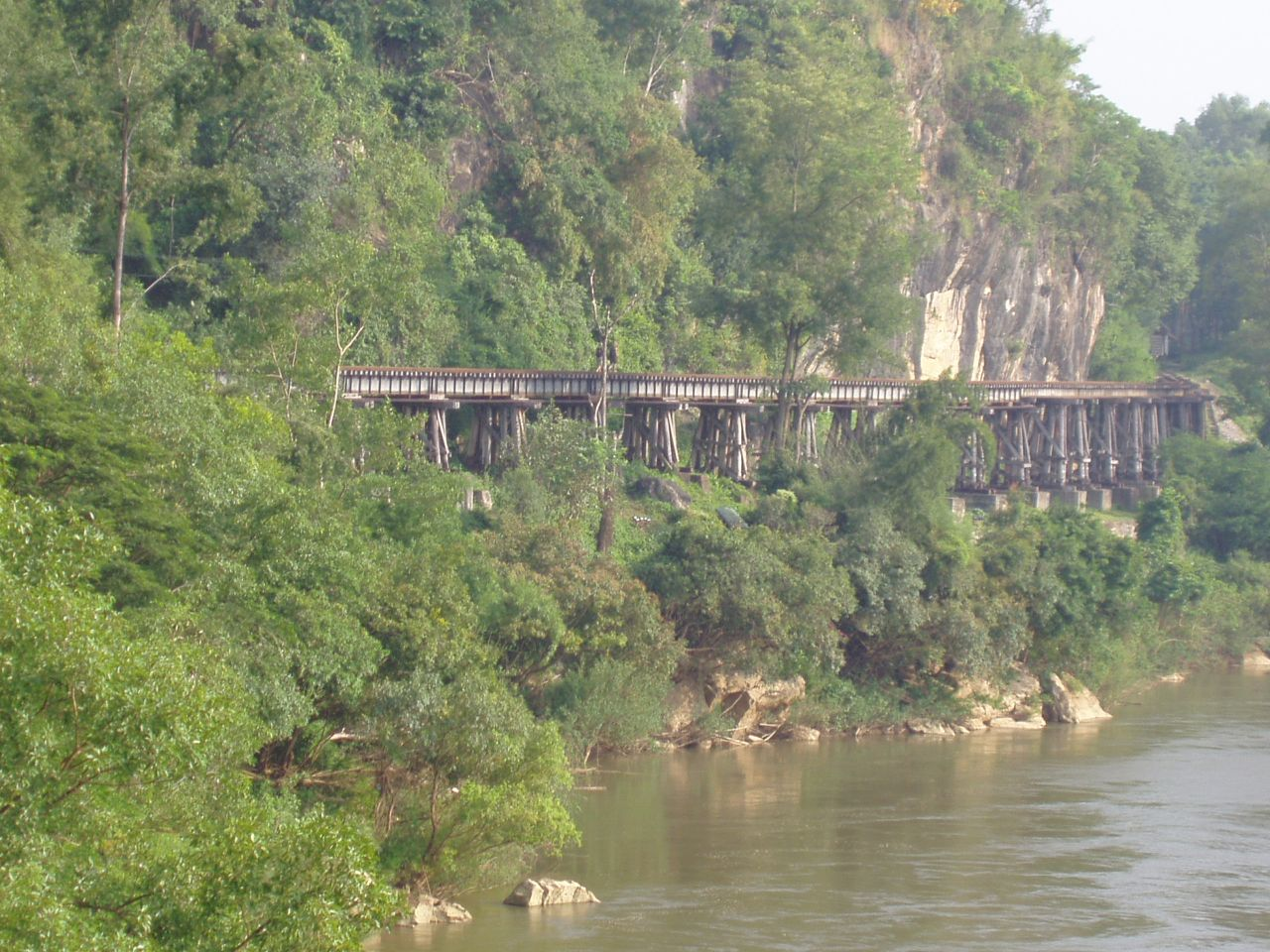
The railway's Wang Pho Viaduct, built by civilians and prisoners-of-war.

The railway was completed ahead of schedule. On 17 October 1943, groups of civilians violently transported from Burma were forced to commence working south, meeting up with groups of civilians taken from Thailand who were working in a northerly direction. The two sections of the line met at kilometre 263, about 18 km (11 mi) south of the Three Pagodas Pass at Konkoita (nowadays: Kaeng Khoi Tha, Sangkhla Buri District, Kanchanaburi Province). A holiday was declared for 25 October, which was chosen as the ceremonial opening of the line. The Japanese staff would travel by train C56 31 from Nong Pladuk, Thailand to Thanbyuzayat, Burma. A copper spike was driven at the meeting point by commanding General Eiguma Ishida, and a memorial plaque was revealed.

The Japanese Army transported 500,000 tonnes of freight over the railway during the course of the war. Construction camps housing at least 1,000 workers each were established every 5–10 miles (8–17 km) of the route. Workers were moved up and down the railway line as needed. The construction camps consisted of open-sided barracks built of bamboo poles with thatched roofs. The barracks were about 60 m (66 yd) long with sleeping platforms raised above the ground on each side of an earthen floor. Two hundred people were housed in each barrack, giving each person a two-foot wide space in which to live and sleep. Camps were usually named after the kilometre where they were located. The worst months of the construction period were known as the "Speedo" (mid-spring to mid-October 1943).

=== Post-war ===
Within a year of the Second World War ending, Britain retook Burma, Malaya, Singapore and the Straits Settlements, while facing bankruptcy. On 16 January 1946, the British ordered Japanese prisoners of war to remove a four-kilometre (2.5-mile) stretch of rail between Nikki (Ni Thea) and Sonkrai. The railway link between Thailand and Burma was to be separated again in order to protect British interests in Singapore. After that, the Burma section of the railway was sequentially removed, the rails were gathered in Mawlamyine, and the roadbed was returned to the jungle.

In October 1946, the Thai section of the line was sold to the Government of Thailand for £1,250,000 (50 million baht; equivalent to US$45,263,000 in 2025). The money was used to compensate neighbouring countries and colonies for material stolen by Japan during the construction of the railway. On 1 February 1947, two people—including Momluang Kri Dechatiwong, the Thai Minister of Transport—were killed on an inspection tour when the bridge near Konkoita collapsed. After the accident, it was decided to end the line at Nam Tok and reuse the remainder to rehabilitate the line.

After the war, the railway was in poor condition and needed reconstruction for use by the Royal Thai Railway system. On 24 June 1949, the portion from Kanchanaburi to Nong Pla Duk (Thai หนองปลาดุก) was finished; on the first of April 1952, the next section up to Wang Pho (Wangpo) was done. The two curved spans of the bridge which collapsed due to the British air attack were replaced by angular truss spans provided by Japan as part of their postwar reparations, thus forming the iconic bridge now seen today. Finally, on 1 July 1958, the rail line was completed to Nam Tok (Thai น้ำตก, 'waterfall', referring to the nearby Sai Yok Noi Waterfall) The portion in use today is some 130 km (81 mi) long.

The line was abandoned beyond Nam Tok Sai Yok Noi; the steel rails were salvaged for reuse in expanding the Bang Sue railway yard, reinforcing the Bangkok–Ban Phachi Junction double track, rehabilitating the track from Thung Song Junction to Trang, and constructing both the Nong Pla Duk–Suphan Buri and Ban Thung Pho–Khiri Rat Nikhom branch lines. Parts of the abandoned route have been converted into a walking trail.

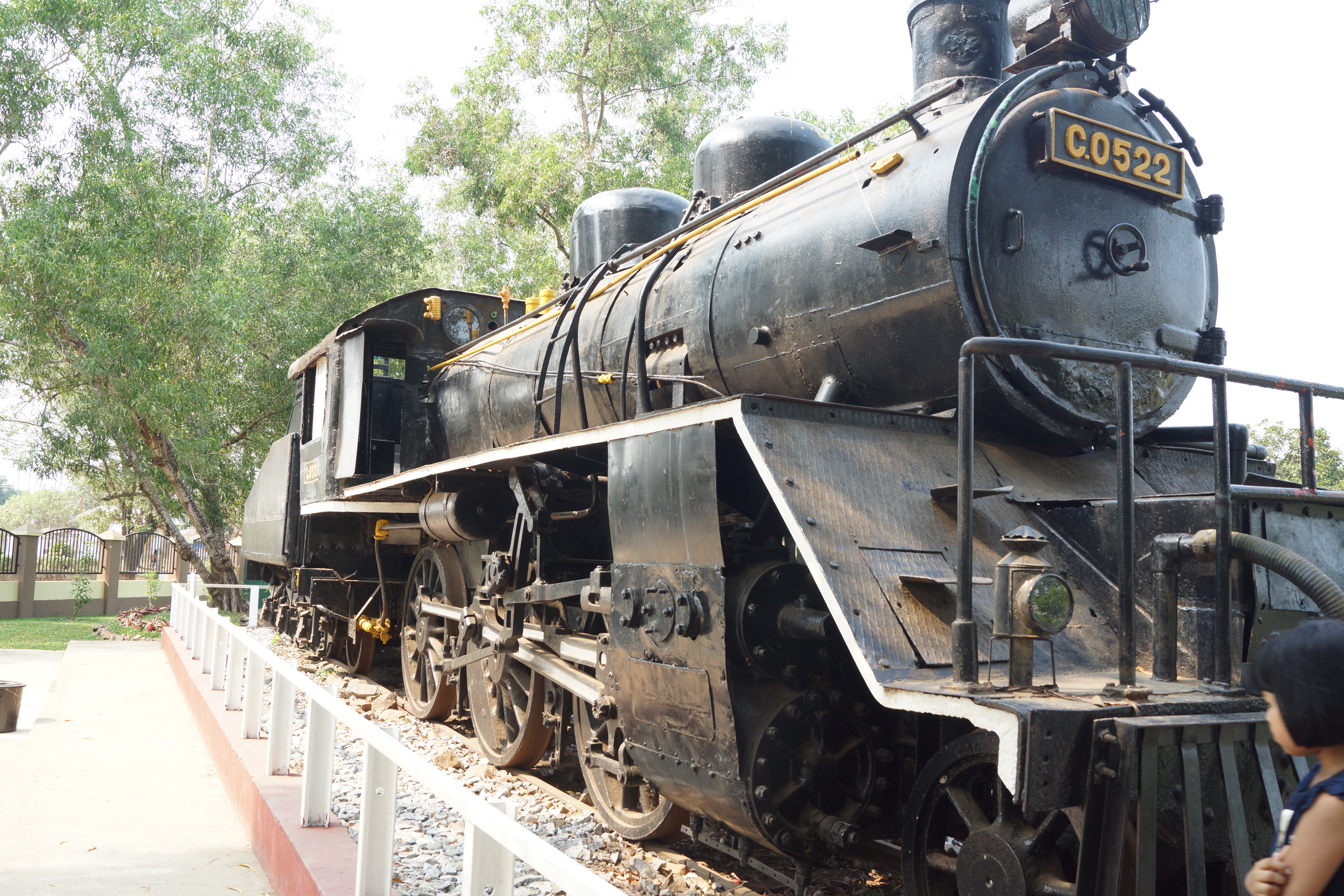
The first locomotive used for the transportation of goods on the Death Railway on display in Thanbyuzayat, Myanmar

Since the 1990s, various proposals have been made to rebuild the complete railway, but as of 2021 these plans had not been realised. Since the upper part of the Khwae valley is now flooded by the Vajiralongkorn Dam, and the surrounding terrain is mountainous, it would take extensive tunnelling to reconnect Thailand with Burma by rail.

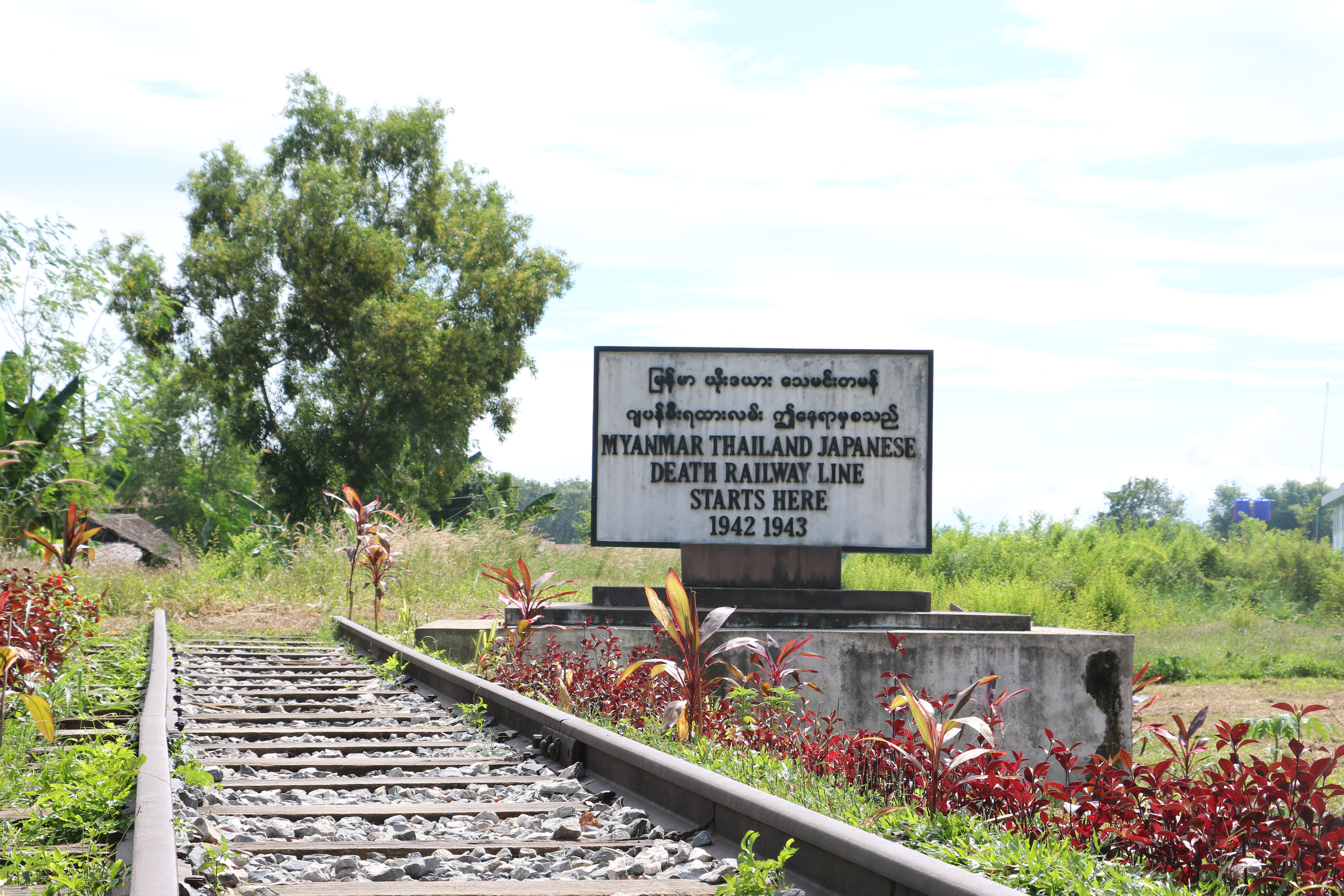
The railway's starting point in Myanmar (Burma).

== Labourers ==
=== Japanese ===
Japanese soldiers, 12,000 of them, including 800 Koreans, were employed on the railway as engineers, guards, and supervisors of the POW and civilian labourers. Although working conditions were far better for the Japanese than the POWs and civilian workers, about 1,000 (eight percent) of them died during construction. Many remember Japanese soldiers as being cruel and indifferent to the fate of Allied military prisoners and the Southeast Asian civilians. Many men in the railway workforce bore the brunt of pitiless or uncaring guards. Cruelty could take different forms, from extreme violence and torture to minor acts of physical punishment, humiliation, and neglect.

=== Trafficked civilians ===
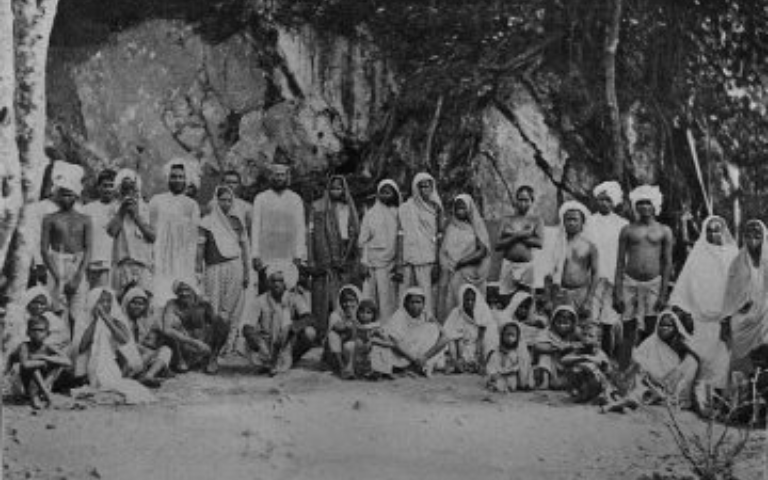
Malayan Tamils in the work camps

Over 180,000 Southeast Asian civilians were forcibly conscripted to work on the Death railway. Limited record keeping on the civilian populations under British occupation has led to incomplete and insufficient recording of the names and families of individuals who were trafficked. Javanese, Malayan Tamils, Burmese, Malayan Chinese, and other Southeast Asians were trafficked by the Imperial Japanese Army to work on the railway, dying in its construction. During the initial stages of the construction of the railway, Burmese and Thais were employed in their respective countries, but the number of workers recruited was insufficient. In Malaya, plantation families were forced by Japanese officers to send their children to the railway and young healthy men were often abducted and trafficked to the railway.

In early 1943, the Japanese advertised for workers in Malaya, Singapore, and the Dutch East Indies, promising good wages, short contracts, and housing for families. When that failed to attract sufficient workers, they resorted to more violent methods, rounding up civilians, including children and imprisoning them, especially in Malaya. Approximately 90,000 Burmese and 75,000 Malayans worked on the railroad. More than 100,000 Malayan Tamils were brought into the project and around 60,000 perished. Southeast Asian workers were used to build the Kra Isthmus Railway from Chumphon to Kra Buri, and the Sumatra or Palembang Railway from Pekanbaru to Muaro. Those left to maintain the lines after the completion of the Death Railway suffered from appalling living conditions as well as increasing Allied bombing.

=== Prisoners of war ===
The movement of captured British soldiers northward from Changi Prison in Singapore and other prison camps in Southeast Asia began in May 1942. On 23 June 1942, 600 British soldiers arrived at Camp Nong Pladuk, Thailand to build a camp to serve as a transit camp for the work camps along the railway. The first prisoners of war, 3,000 Australians, left Changi Prison in Singapore on 14 May 1942 and journeyed by sea to near Thanbyuzayat (သံဖြူဇရပ် in the Burmese language; in English 'Tin Shelter'), the northern terminus of the railway. They worked on airfields and other infrastructure initially before beginning construction of the railway in October 1942. In Thailand, 3,000 British soldiers left Changi by train in June 1942 to Ban Pong, the southern terminus of the railway. Some captured British soldiers were taken from Singapore and the Dutch East Indies as construction advanced.

== Atrocities ==
=== Conditions during construction ===
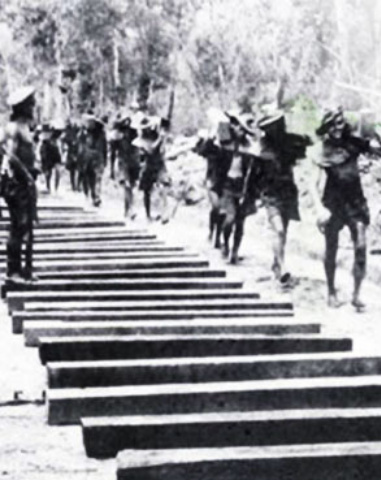
Asian civilians during the construction

The records of the civilian workers have not survived due to the limitations on birth and death records kept during pre- and post-war colonisation of the region. One soldier said they "found themselves at the bottom of a social system that was harsh, punitive, fanatical, and often deadly." The living and working conditions on the Burma Railway were often described as "horrific", with maltreatment, sickness, and starvation.

Life in the POW camps was recorded at great risk by artists such as Jack Bridger Chalker, Philip Meninsky, John Mennie, Ashley George Old, and Ronald Searle. Human hair was often used for brushes, plant juices and blood for paint, and toilet paper as the "canvas". Some of their works were used as evidence in the trials of Japanese war criminals. Many are now held by the Australian War Memorial, State Library of Victoria, and the Imperial War Museum in London.

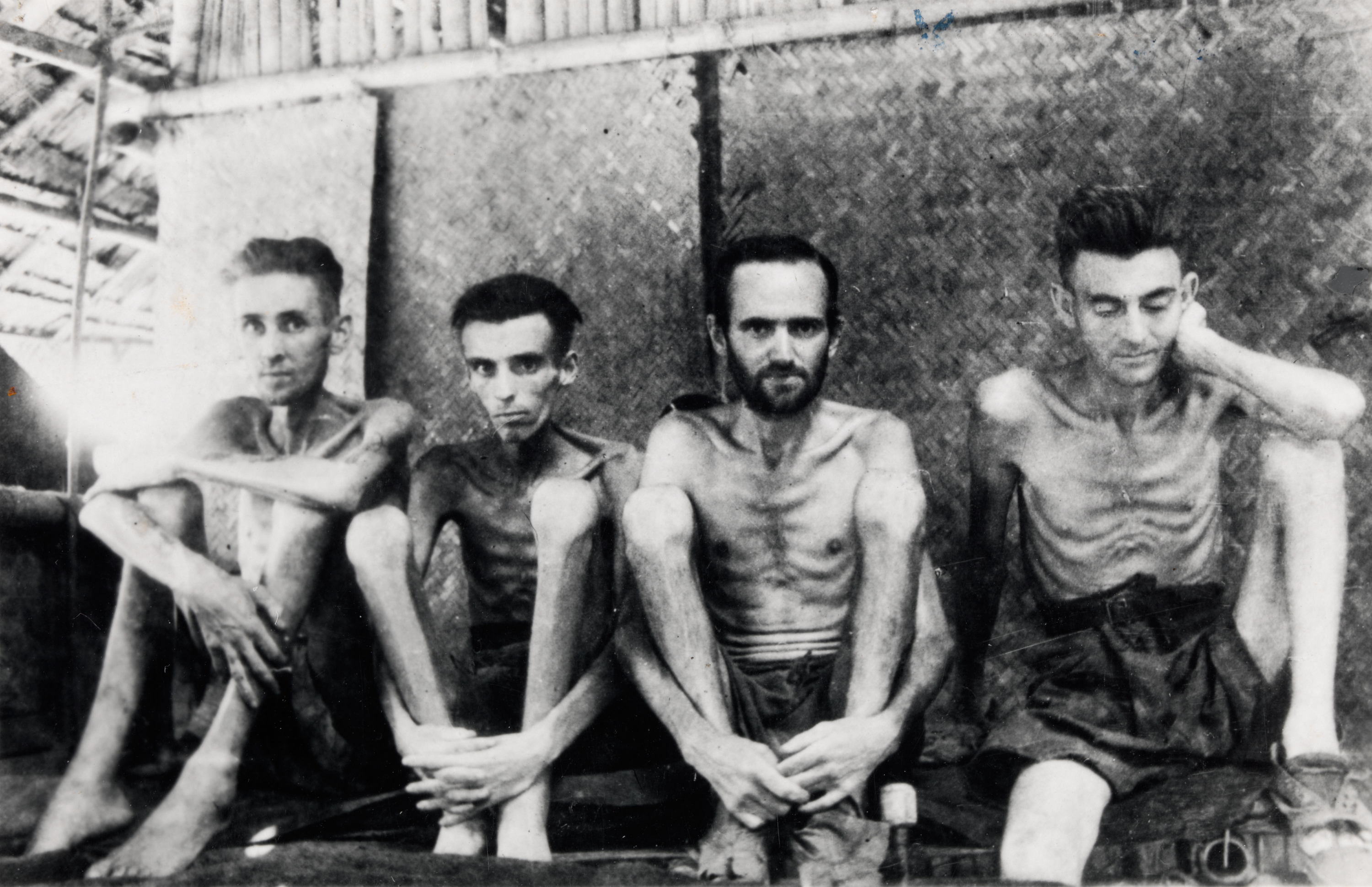
Australian and Dutch prisoners of war, suffering from beriberi, at Tarsau in Thailand in 1943.

One of the accounts from the British military perspective was John Coast's Railroad of Death, first published in 1946 and republished in a new edition in 2014. Coast's work is noted for its detail on the brutality of some Japanese and Korean guards as well as the humanity of others. It also describes the living and working conditions, together with the culture of the Thai towns and countryside that became many POWs' homes after leaving Singapore. Coast also details the camaraderie, pastimes, and humour of the soldiers in the face of adversity. Allied soldiers were often given more freedom than their civilian counterparts, to play guitar or accordion, or lead a group sing-along, or request camp comedians to tell some jokes or put on a skit.

After the railway was completed, most of the British soldiers were moved to hospital and relocation camps where they could be available for maintenance crews or sent to Japan. In maintenance camps entertainment flourished, theatres of bamboo and attap (palm fronds) were built, sets, lighting, costumes and makeup devised, and an array of entertainment produced that included music halls, variety shows, cabarets, plays, and musical comedies – even pantomimes. These activities engaged numerous soldiers as actors, singers, musicians, designers, technicians, and female impersonators.

The construction of the Burma Railway is considered a war crime committed by Japan.

=== Death rates and causes ===
Deaths of Allied Soldiers working on the Death Railway, 1942–1945
| Country of origin | POWs | Number of deaths | Death rate |
|---|---|---|---|
| UK, British India or crown colony | 30,131 | 6,904 | 23% |
| Netherlands or Dutch East Indies | 17,990 | 2,782 | 15% |
| Australia | 13,004 | 2,802 | 22% |
| United States | 686 | 133 | 19% |
| Total | 61,811 | 12,621 | 20% |

In addition to malnutrition and physical abuse, malaria, cholera, dysentery and tropical ulcers were common contributing factors in the death of workers on the Burma Railway. The labourers who suffered the highest casualties were the Chinese, as well as Burmese and Indian Tamils from Malaya and Myanmar and many Javanese.

A lower death rate among Dutch POWs and internees, relative to those from the UK and Australia, has been linked to the fact that many personnel and civilians taken prisoner in the Dutch East Indies had been born there, were long-term residents and/or had Eurasian ancestry; they tended thus to be more resistant to tropical diseases and to be better acclimatized than other Western Allied personnel.

The quality of medical care received by different groups of prisoners varied enormously. One factor was that many European and US doctors had little experience with tropical diseases. For example, a group of 400 Dutch prisoners, which included three doctors with extensive tropical medicine experience, suffered no deaths at all. Another group, numbering 190 US personnel, to whom Lieutenant Henri Hekking, a Dutch medical officer with experience in the tropics was assigned, suffered only nine deaths. Another cohort of 450 US personnel suffered 100 deaths.

Weight loss among Allied officers who worked on construction was, on average, 9–14 kg (20–30 lb) less than that of enlisted personnel. Workers in more isolated areas suffered a much higher death rate than did others.

=== War crimes trials ===
At the end of World War II, 111 Japanese military officials were tried for war crimes for their brutality during the construction of the railway. Thirty-two of them were sentenced to death. The most important trial was against the general staff. Lieutenant General Eiguma Ishida, overall commander of the Burma Railway, was sentenced to 10 years imprisonment. His subordinates Colonel Shigeo Nakamura, Colonel Tamie Ishii and Lieutenant-Colonel Shoichi Yanagita were sentenced to death. Major Sotomatsu Chida was sentenced to 10 years imprisonment. Hiroshi Abe, a first lieutenant who supervised construction of the railway at Sonkrai where 600 British prisoners out of 1,600 died of cholera and other diseases, was sentenced to death, later commuted to life in prison, as a B/C class war criminal. He served 11 years.

== Features of the Railway ==
=== Bridge 277: Bridge on the River Khwae ===
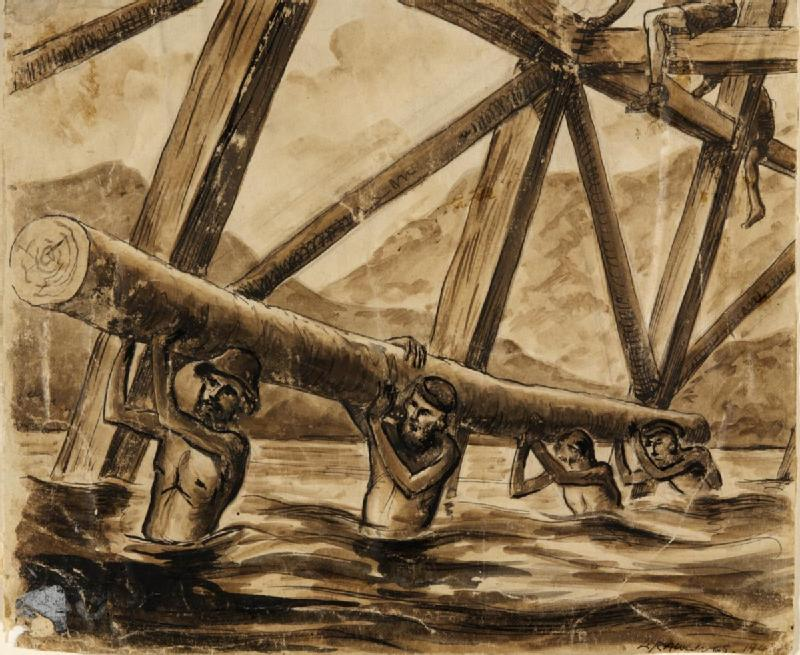
Bridge over the River Kwai, a 1943 illustration by Leo Rawlings of four prisoners-of-war during the first bridge's construction.

A key feature of the line is Bridge 277 built over a stretch of the river then known as part of the Mae Klong River. The greater part of the Thai section of the river's route followed the valley of the Khwae Noi River (Thai: แควน้อย: khwae (แคว), 'stream, river' or 'tributary'; noi (น้อย), 'small'. Khwae was frequently mispronounced by the British as kwai (ควาย), or 'buffalo' in Thai). This gave rise to the name of "River Kwai" amongst the British. In 1960, the portion of the Mae Klong which passes under the bridge was renamed the Khwae Yai (Thai: แควใหญ่, 'big tributary').

On 26 October 1942, British prisoners of war arrived at Tamarkan to construct the bridge. Initially, 1,000 prisoners worked on the bridge, led by Colonel Philip Toosey. In February 1943, 1,000 Dutch prisoners of war were added to Tamarkan. Chinese, Malay and Tamil civilians also worked on the bridge.

The first wooden railroad bridge over the Khwae Yai was finished in February 1943, which was soon accompanied by a more modern ferro-concrete bridge in June 1943, with both bridges running in a NNE–SSW direction across the river. The steel and concrete bridge consisted of eleven curved-truss bridge spans brought by the Japanese from Java in 1942. This is the bridge that still remains today.

==== Bombardments of Bridge 277 ====
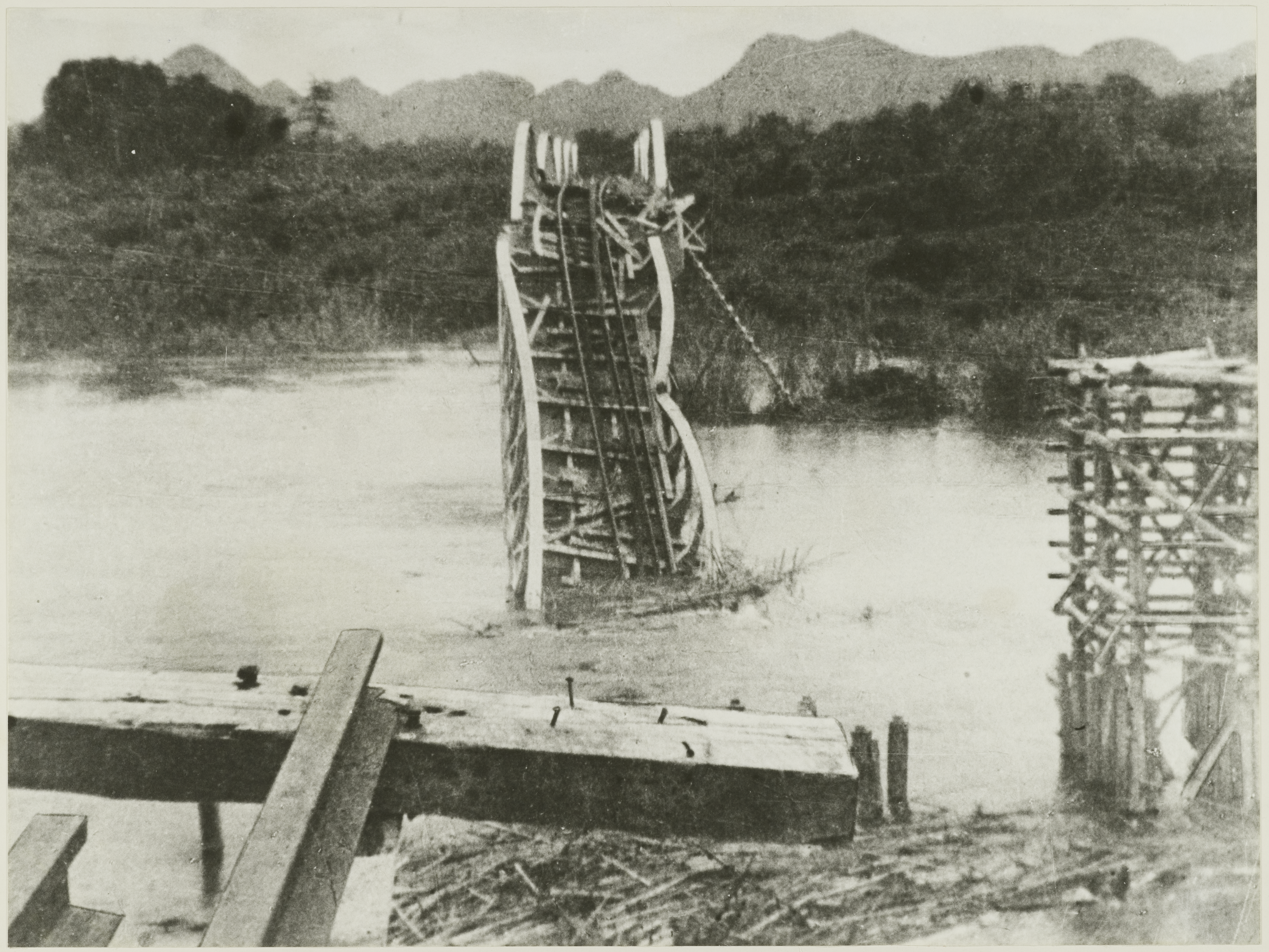
Destroyed bridge (date unknown)

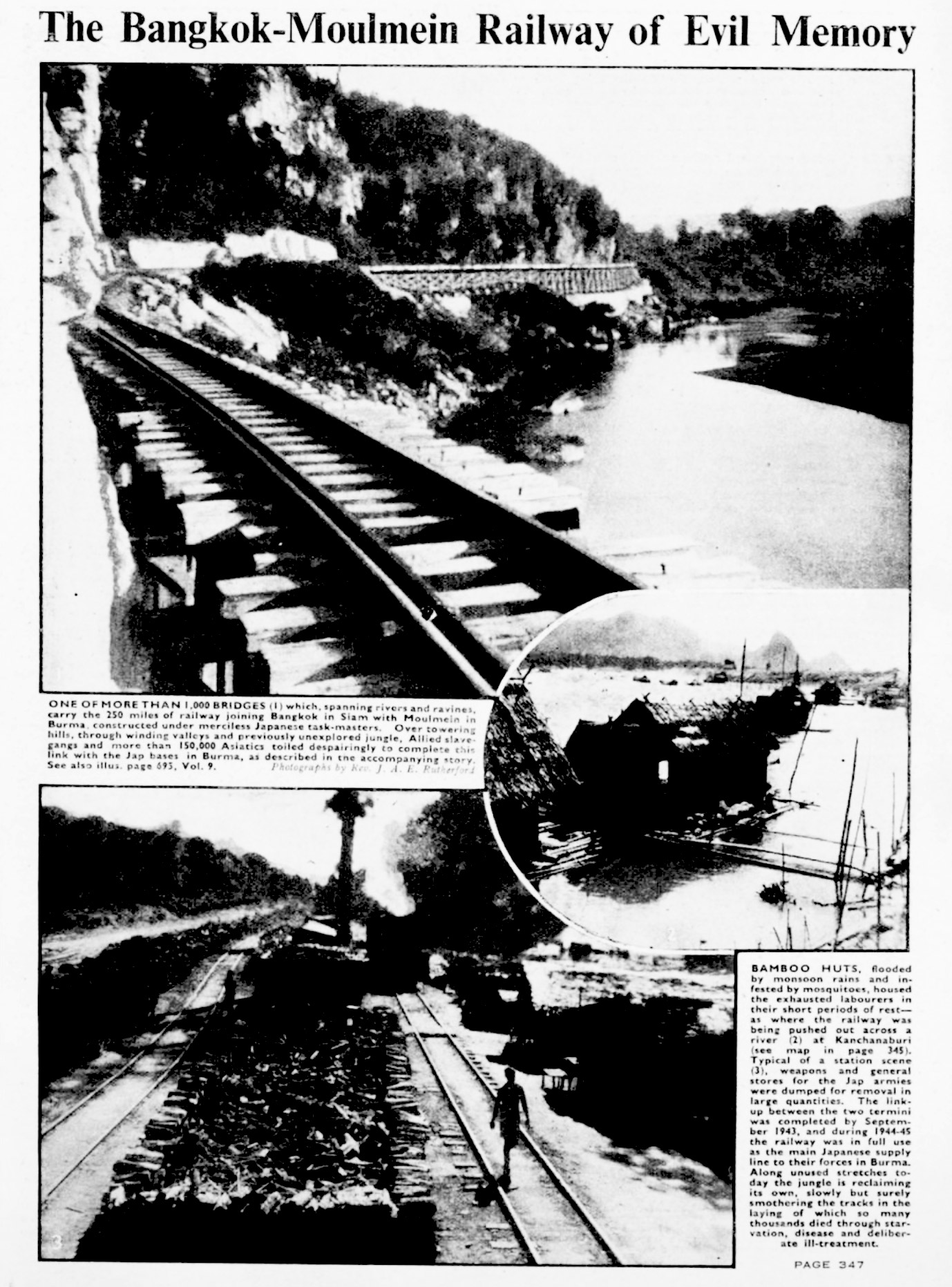
The Bangkok–Moulmein Railway of Evil Memory by J.A.E. Rutherford (1946).

In 1945 a planned US attack was cancelled due to bad weather. The two bridges were bombed on 13 February 1945 by RAF aircraft. The forced labourers repaired the bridge and by April the wooden bridge was in operation. On 3 April 1945, a USAAF Liberator attack damaged the wooden railroad bridge. Repair work continued and both bridges were operational again by the end of May. On 24 June 1945 the RAF destroyed the railroad bridges, putting the railway line out of commission for the rest of the war.

The railway line did not fully connect with the Burmese railroad network as no railroad bridges were built that crossed the river between Moulmein and Martaban.

=== Hellfire Pass ===
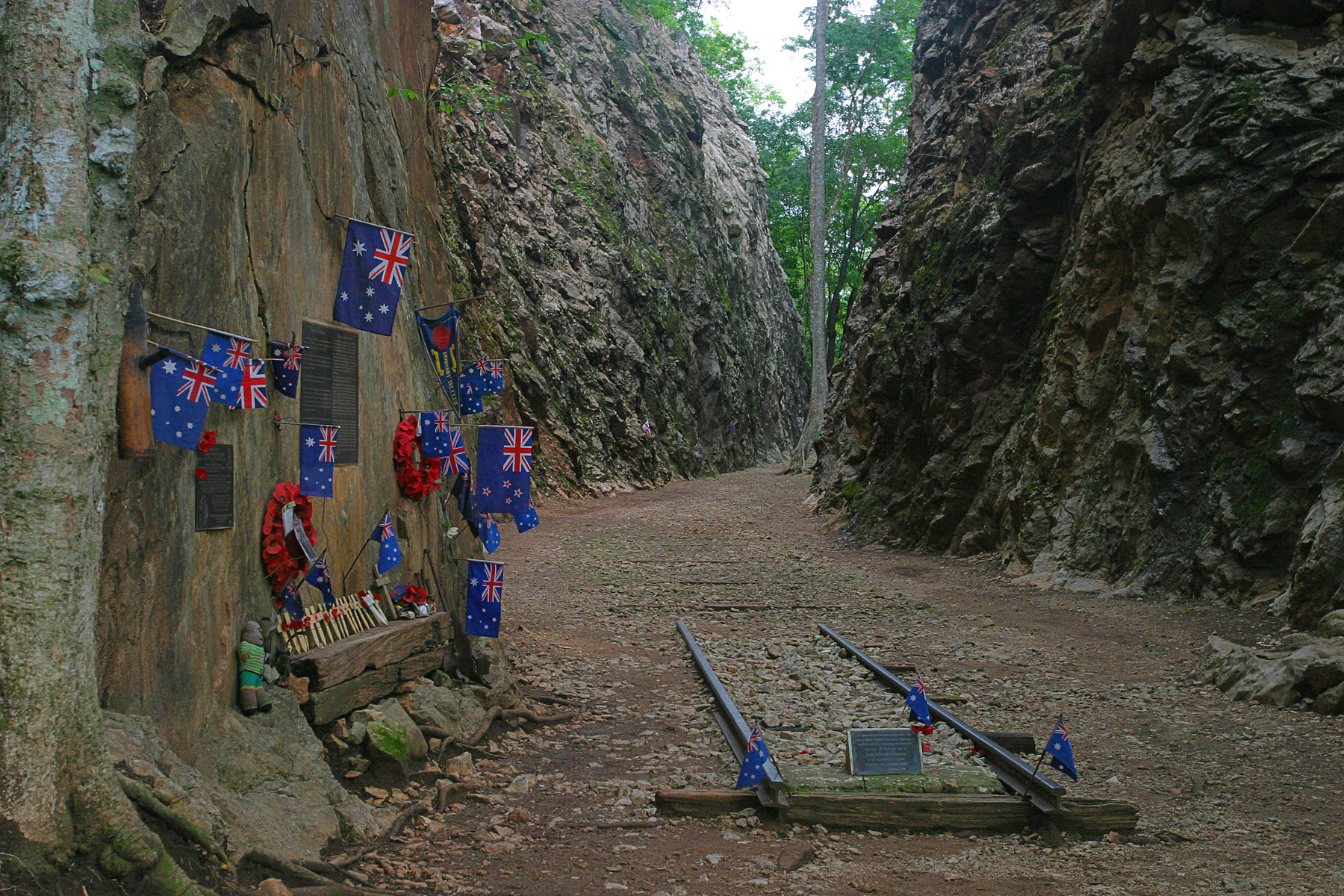
The cutting at Hellfire Pass was one of the most difficult and deadly sections built.

Hellfire Pass in the Tenasserim Hills was the largest rock cutting on the railway, built in a remote area, without appropriate construction tools by Chinese, Thai, Malay, and Tamil civilian prisoners and Allied soldiers.

=== Significant bridges ===
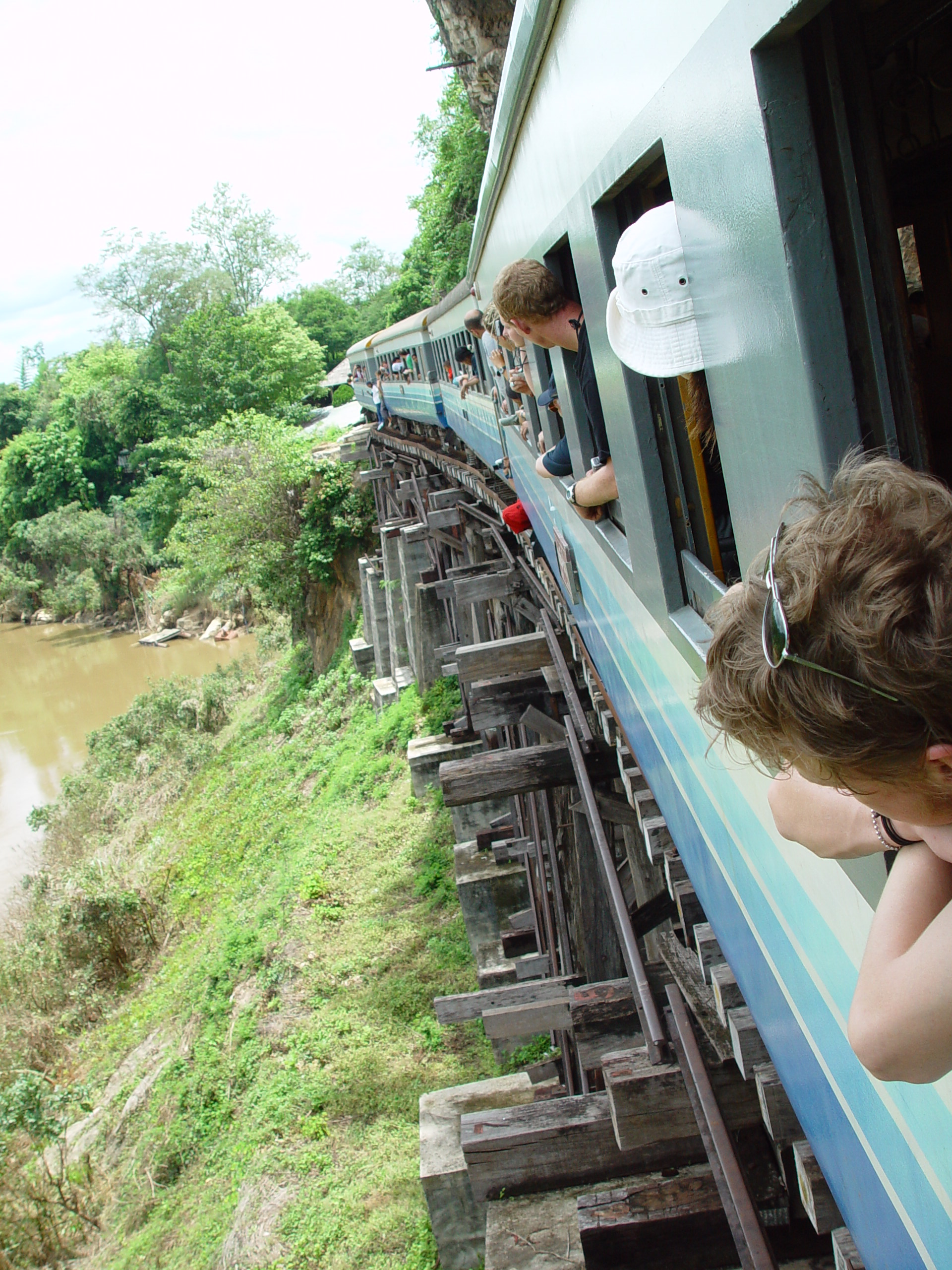
Along the Death Railway in 2004. The River Khwae is on the left.

| Length | Name | Type and where | km | refs |
|---|---|---|---|---|
| 322 m (1,056 ft) | Kwae Yai Bridge | Iron bridge across Kwae Yai River at Tha Makham | 56 |
| 400 m (1,300 ft) | Wang Pho Viaduct | Wooden trestle edging Khwae Noi River | 114 |
| unknown | Three-Tiered Bridge | Wooden trestle | 155 |
| 90 m (300 ft) | Songkurai bridge | Wooden trestle across Songkalia River | 294 |
| 56 m (184 ft) | | Wooden trestle across Mekaza River | 319 |
| 75 m (246 ft) | | Wooden trestle across Zamithi River | 329 |
| 50 m (160 ft) | Apalon | Steel bridge across Apalong River | 332 |
| 60 m (200 ft) | | Wooden trestle across Anakui River | 369 |

== Cemeteries and memorials ==
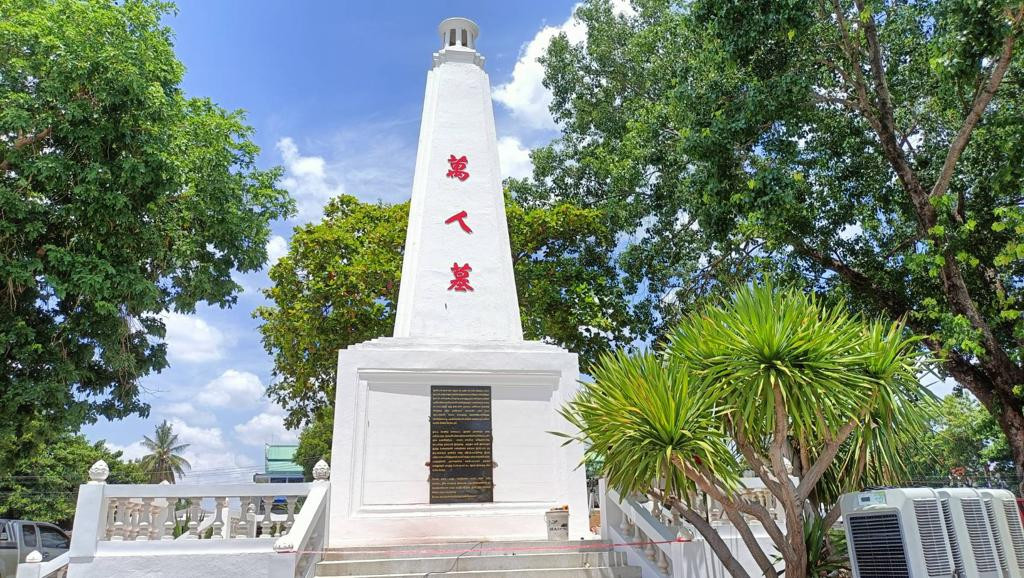
Memorial Pagoda to the Civilian Workers

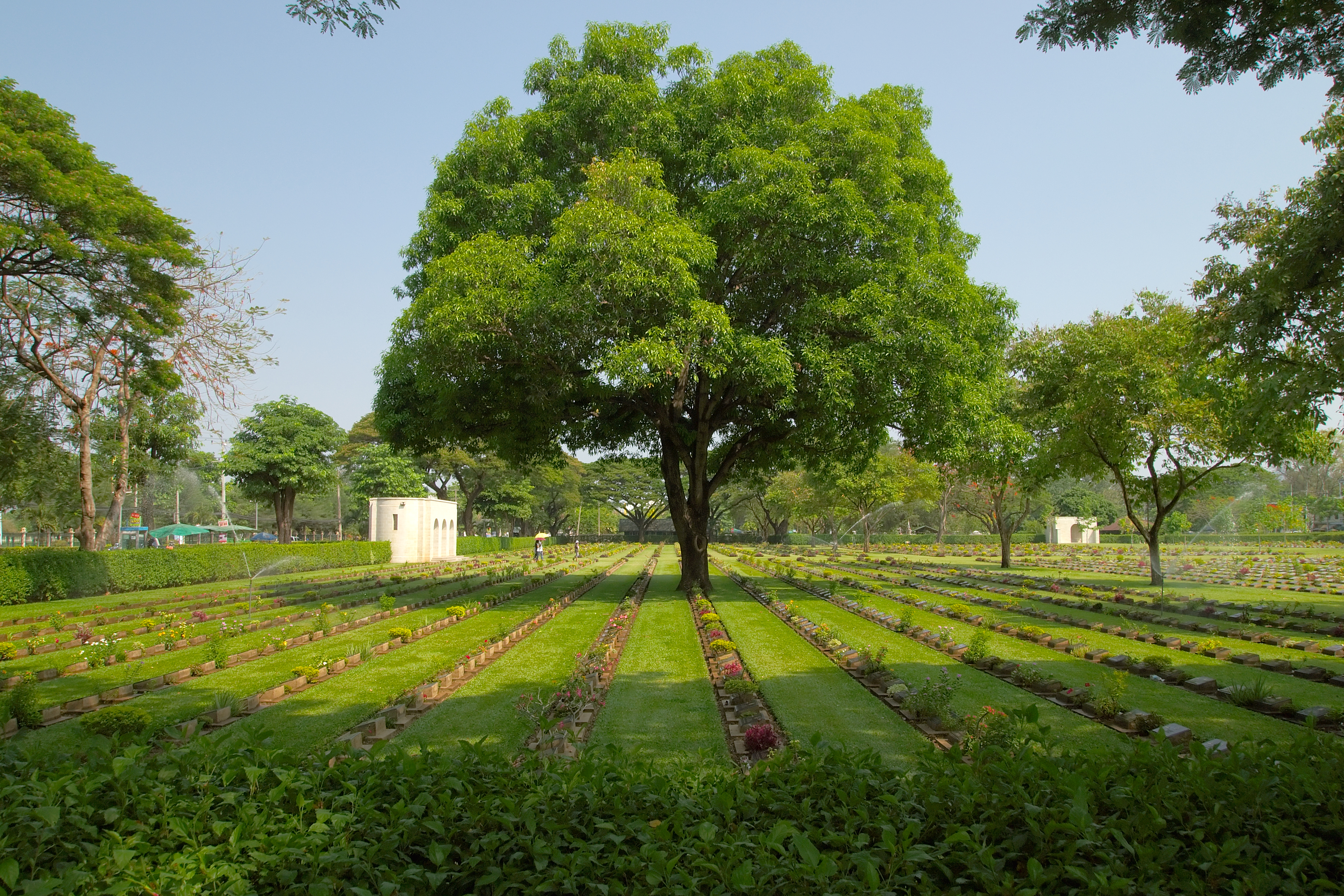
Kanchanaburi War Cemetery

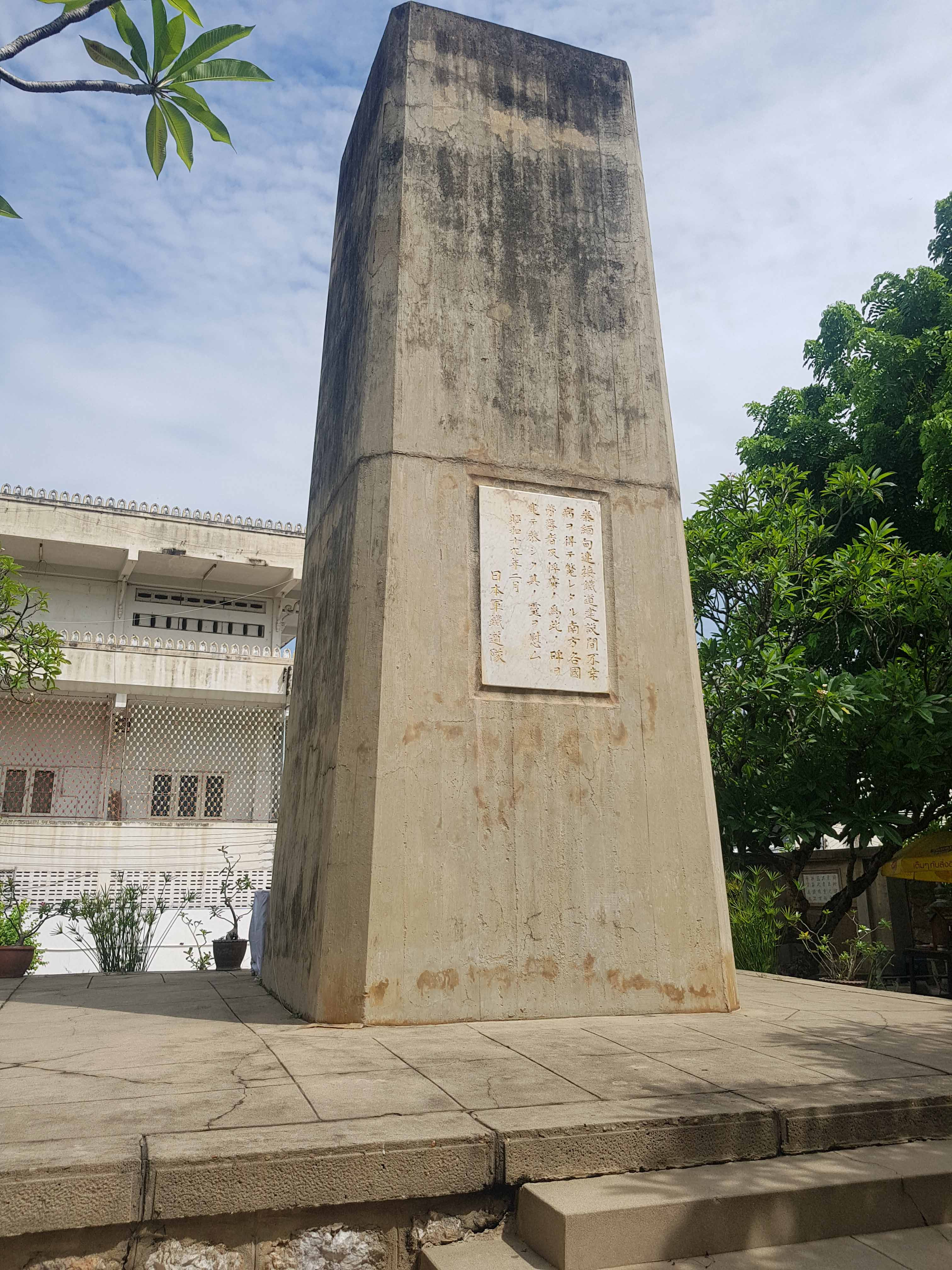
Cenotaph for Southeast Asian civilian and Allied military workers, built by the Imperial Japanese Army Railroad Corps in February 1944 in Kanchanaburi, Thailand.

In 1946, the remains of most of the Allied military war dead were moved from former camps, burial grounds and lone graves along the rail line to official war cemeteries.

The mass graves of the Southeast Asian civilian dead were exhumed from along the rail line and beside former rest camps for reburial at Wat Thaworn Wararam, a Buddhist temple in Ban Tai, Thailand in the 1950s. A pagoda was erected over the burial site and plaques in both Chinese and Tamil text have been added to commemorate the dead. The names of the thousands of civilians buried at the site are unknown.

Three cemeteries maintained by the Commonwealth War Graves Commission (CWGC) are for the Allied military personnel who died on the Burma Railway. Kanchanaburi War Cemetery, in the city of Kanchanaburi, contains the graves of 6,982 Allied military personnel comprising: 3,585 British, 1,896 Dutch, 1,362 Australians, 12 members of the British Indian Army (including British officers), 2 New Zealanders, 2 Danes and 8 Canadians.

A memorial plaque at the Kanchanaburi cemetery lists 11 other members of the British Indian Army, these Indian officers are buried in nearby Muslim cemeteries.

Thanbyuzayat War Cemetery, at Thanbyuzayat, 65 kilometres (40 mi) south of Moulmein, Myanmar (Burma) has the graves of 3,617 soldiers who died on the Burmese portion of the line: 1,651 British, 1,335 Australians, 621 Dutch, 15 members of the British Indian Army (including British officers), three New Zealanders and one Canadian.

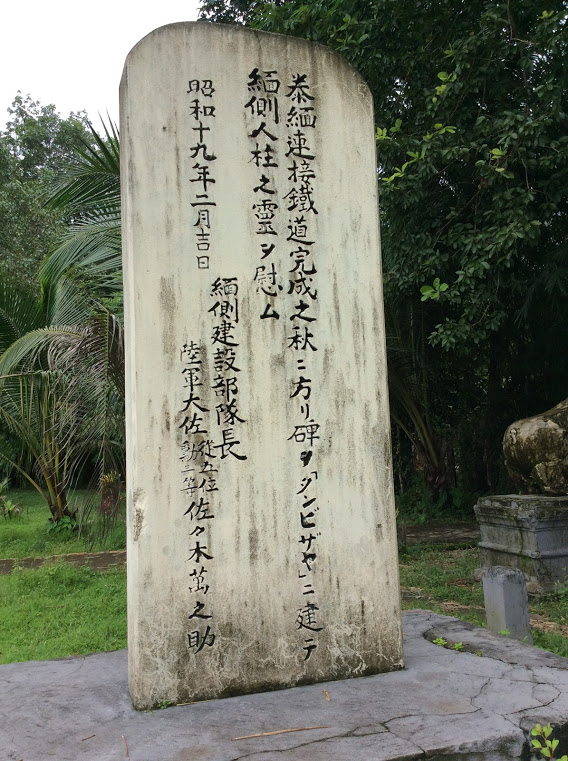
Cenotaph for the victims, built by Japanese in Thanbyuzayat, Myanmar

Chungkai War Cemetery, near Kanchanaburi, has a further 1,693 Allied war graves: 1,373 British, 314 Dutch and six members of the British Indian Army (including British officers)

The remains of United States armed forces personnel were repatriated. Of the 668 US personnel forced to work on the railway, 133 died. This included personnel from USS Houston and the 131st Field Artillery Regiment of the Texas Army National Guard. The Americans were called the Lost Battalion as their fate was unknown to the United States for more than two years after their capture.

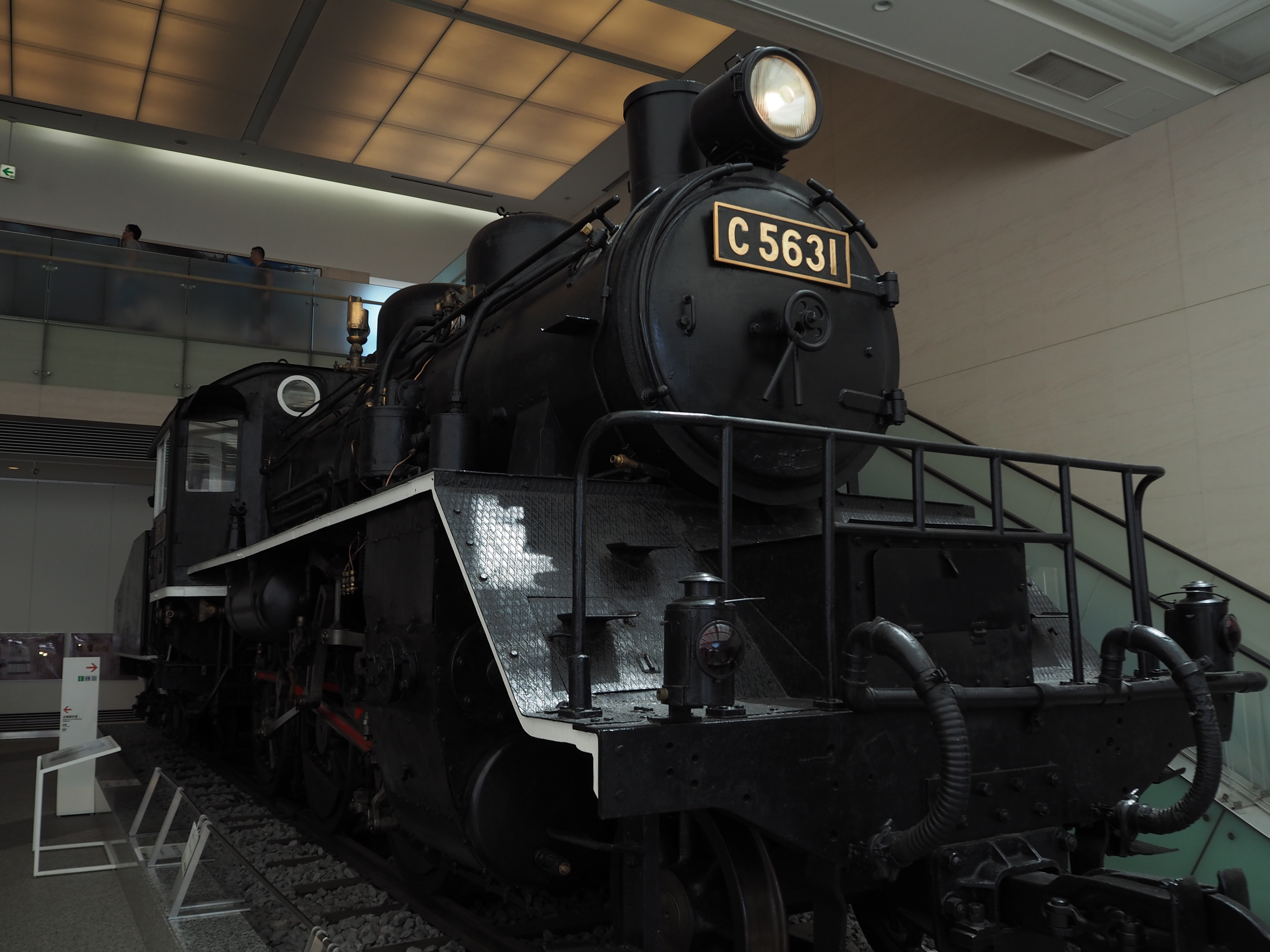
C56 31, a JNR Class C56 locomotive used on the Death Railway, on display at the Yasukuni War Museum, Japan.

Several museums are dedicated to those who perished building the railway. The largest of these is at Hellfire Pass (north of the current terminus at Nam Tok), a cutting where the greatest number of people died. An Australian memorial is at Hellfire Pass. One museum is in Myanmar side Thanbyuzayat, and two other museums are in Kanchanaburi: the Thailand–Burma Railway Centre, opened in January 2003, and the JEATH War Museum. There is a memorial plaque at the Kwai bridge itself, and an historic wartime steam locomotive is on display.

A preserved section of line has been rebuilt at the National Memorial Arboretum in England.

== Notable labourers ==
=== Civilian labourers ===
- Arumugam Kandasamy (1927–2024), trafficked with 50 other civilians from the estate of Sua Gerising, Port Dickson at the age of 15, is believed to have been the last living survivor. He died on 9 November 2024 at the age of 97.

=== Allied labourers ===
- Sir Ken Anderson (1909–1985), Australian senator and minister in the Menzies, Holt, McEwen, Gorton and McMahon governments
- Sir Harold Atcherley (1918-2017), businessman, public figure and arts administrator in the United Kingdom
- Idris James “Taff” Barwick (d.1974), author of In the Shadow of Death, The Story of a Medic on the Burma Railway, 1942-45.
- Theo Bot (1911–1984), Dutch politician and diplomat, government minister and ambassador
- Leo Britt, British theatrical producer in Chungkai, Kachu Mountain, and Nakhon Nai
- Sir John Carrick (1918–2018), Australian senator and minister in the Fraser government
- Norman Carter, Australian theatrical producer in Bicycle Camp, Java, in numerous camps on the Burma side of the construction, and later in Tamarkan, Thailand
- Jack Bridger Chalker (1918-2014), artist best known for his work recording the lives of prisoners of war in World War II
- Anthony Chenevix-Trench (1919–1979), headmaster of Bradfield College then of Eton College, 1964–1970 and Fettes College 1972–1979
- Sir Albert Coates, chief Australian medical officer on the railway
- John Coast (1916–1989), British writer and music promoter. He wrote one of the earliest and most respected POW memoirs, Railroad of Death (1946).
- Col. John Harold Henry Coombes, founder and the first Principal of Cadet College Petaro in Pakistan
- Sir Ernest Edward "Weary" Dunlop (1907–1993), Australian surgeon renowned for his leadership of POWs on the railway
- Ringer Edwards, Australian soldier who survived crucifixion at the hands of Japanese soldiers while working on the line
- Arch Flanagan (1915–2013), Australian soldier and father of novelist Richard Flanagan and Martin Flanagan
- Keith Flanagan (d. 2008) Australian soldier, journalist and campaigner for recognition of Weary Dunlop
- David Neville Ffolkes (1912–1966), film and theatre set and costume designer. He won a Tony award in 1947 for his costumes for the play Henry VIII
- William Frankland, British immunologist whose achievements include the popularisation of the pollen count as a piece of weather-related information to the British public and the prediction of increased levels of allergy to penicillin
- Ernest Gordon, the former Presbyterian dean of the chapel at Princeton University
- R. M. Hare, (1919-2002), philosopher
- Jack Jennings (1919–2024), believed to be the last living survivor.
- Wim Kan, Dutch comedian and cabaret producer on the Burma side of the railway during the construction period and later in Nakhon Pathom Hospital Camp in Thailand
- Hamilton Lamb (1900–1943), Australian politician and member of the Victorian Legislative Assembly, died of illness and malnutrition at railway camp 131 Kilo in Thailand
- Eric Lomax, author of The Railway Man, an autobiography based on these events, which has been made into a film of the same name starring Colin Firth and Nicole Kidman
- Jacob Markowitz, Romanian-born Canadian physician (1901–1969), a.k.a. the "Jungle Surgeon", who enlisted with the RAMC
- Tan Sri Professor Sir Alexander Oppenheim, British mathematician, started a POW university for his fellow workers
- Frank Pantridge, British physician
- Donald Purdie (1910-1943), British chemistry professor and department head at Raffles College, Singapore; Purdie died during construction of the railway
- Alfred Pycock, British former Olympic swimmer and RAOC major, awarded MBE for his leadership at the site
- Rowley Richards, Australian doctor who kept detailed notes of his time as a medical officer on the railway. He later wrote a book detailing his experiences
- Rohan Rivett, Australian war correspondent in Singapore; captured after travelling 700 km, predominantly by rowboat, from Singapore; Rivett spent three years working on the Burma railway and later wrote a book chronicling the events.
- Ronald Searle, British cartoonist, creator of the St Trinian's School characters
- E. W. Swanton (1907–2000), Cricket writer and broadcaster. Mentioned in his autobiography – Sort of a Cricket Person, (1972)
- Arie Smit (1916–2016), Dutch artist and colonial army lithographer; captured in East Java by Japanese in March 1942, sent to Changi Prison and worked on Thai section of railway
- Sir Reginald Swartz (1911–2006), Australian politician and minister in the Menzies, Holt, McEwen, Gorton and McMahon governments
- Philip Toosey, senior Allied officer at the Bridge on the River Kwai
- Reg Twigg (1913–2013), British author Survivor on the River Kwai: Life on the Burma Railway, Private in the Leicestershire Regiment
- Tom Uren (1921–2015), Deputy Leader of the Australian Labor Party and minister in the Whitlam and Hawke governments
- Alistair Urquhart, former Gordon Highlander, born in Aberdeen, Scotland. (1919–2016), author of the book The Forgotten Highlander in which he recalls how he survived his three years on the railway
- Ian Watt (1917–1999), literary critic, literary historian and professor of English at Stanford University

== Notable accounts ==
Accounts of the construction include A Baba Boyhood: Growing up during the Japanese Occupation of Singapore by William Gwee Thian Hock and an anthology of the experiences of survivors in Revisiting the Death Railway: The Survivors’ Accounts by Sasidaran Sellappah. The Japanese Occupation of Malaya: A Social and Economic History by Paul H. Kratosk and The Thai Resistance Movement during the Second World War by Eiji Murashima provide a social and economic analysis of the railway's construction and its civilian builders. The book Through the Valley of the Kwai is an autobiography of British Army captain Ernest Gordon. James D. Hornfischer's book Ship of Ghosts: The Story of the USS Houston, FDR's Legendary Lost Cruiser and the Epic Saga of Her Survivors depicts the construction of the railway from the point of view of the survivors of the heavy cruiser USS Houston, which was sunk at the Battle of Sunda Strait in 1942. Escape accounts include Corporal Pagani's in The Flame of Freedom by Robert Hamond, and James Bradley's Towards the Setting Sun.

Richard Flanagan's 2013 novel The Narrow Road to the Deep North centres on a group of Australian POWs and their experiences building the railway, and was awarded the 2014 Man Booker Prize.

== Death Railway Interest Group (DRIG) ==
The Death Railway Interest Group (DRIG) is a Malaysian NGO that leads on the collection of Asian survivor accounts in Malaysia and Thailand, working to update records and presenting these at Australian and New-Zealand based humanitarian events. DRIG aims to identify at least one mass grave along the railway and build a monument to the horrors these victims went through, as well as their surviving families.

DRIG led the development of a further memorial to the civilian labourers at Wat Tavorn Wararam, which manages the Wat Yuan Cemetery in Kanchanaburi, opened on 3 June 2023. This is in addition to the pagoda built over the remains of thousands of workers. The temple had undertaken the task of recovering the dead and burying them in the Wat Yuan Cemetery.

== Cultural impact and legacy ==
The construction of the railway was the subject of a fictional award-winning 1957 film, The Bridge on the River Kwai (itself an adaptation of the French language novel The Bridge over the River Kwai); a novel, The Narrow Road to the Deep North by Richard Flanagan.

A 1999 documentary by film maker Nick Lera records his search for the railway and features vintage British Pacific locomotives and other historic steam locomotives, as well as the Wampo wood trestles and war relics.

The 2013 film The Railway Man (based on the book of the same name) gives the insight of a POW into the conditions inflicted upon the workers who built the railway. The 2001 film To End All Wars is based on the autobiography of British Army captain Ernest Gordon.

In 2016, R.AGE, the youth news and lifestyle platform of The Star (Malaysia) interviewed one of the last-known Asian survivors in "Surviving Thailand's infamous 'Death Railway': Arumugam Kandasamy".

== New archaeological and forensic discoveries ==
In 2025, a Buddhist ceremony was held for the cremation of remains from 106 Tamil laborers whose bones were discovered during a construction project near the governor's office in Kanchanaburi. These findings have shed light on forgotten mass graves and contributed to a growing grassroots effort to uncover and map lost sections of the railway and the stories of Romusha (Asian forced laborers).

== See also ==
- "Death Railway" (Spyforce episode)
- Far East prisoners of war
- Hellship
- Kra Isthmus Railway
- Military railways
- Siam–Burma Death Railway (film)
- Slavery in Japan
- Strategic railway
- Sumatra Railway
