= Rowley Richards =

Charles Rowland Bromley Richards
- Born: 8 June 1916; Summer Hill, New South Wales
- Died: 26 February 2015 (aged 98); Manly, New South Wales
- Military career
- Allegiance: Australia
- Branch: Australian Army
- Service years: 1933–1945
- Rank: Captain
- Nickname: Rowley
- Service number: NX70273
- Unit: 2/15th Field Regiment
- Conflicts: Second World War; Malayan Campaign
- Awards: Member of the Order of the British Empire; Medal of the Order of Australia; Centenary Medal; Mentioned in Despatches
- Other work: Chairman of the St John Ambulance Association

Charles Rowland Bromley "Rowley" Richards MBE, OAM, ED (8 June 1916 – 26 February 2015) was an Australian Army medical officer who, as a prisoner of war during the Second World War, is credited with saving countless lives on the notorious Burma Railway where prisoners suffered and died under inhumane conditions. Journalist Andrew Denton described him as "as good a man as this country has produced".

A graduate of the University of Sydney, Richards became Regimental Medical Officer of the 2/15th Field Regiment in 1940. When Singapore fell on 15 February 1942, he became a prisoner of the Japanese. In September 1944, the transport on which he was being shipped to Japan was attacked and sunk by US submarines. He spent three days on a raft before he was picked up by a Japanese warship, and spent the rest of the war in Sakata in Yamagata Prefecture, Japan.

Richards returned to Australia in October 1945, married and established a private practice. He served as chairman of the St John Ambulance Association, as medical adviser to the Australian Olympic rowing teams, and as honorary medical director of the City to Surf. He published two books about his wartime experiences.

== Early life ==
Charles Rowland Bromley Richards was born in Summer Hill, New South Wales, on 8 June 1916, the son of Charles Howell Richards, a draughtsman who worked for H. E. C. Robinson, which produced the Gregory's street directory, and his wife, Clive (née Bromley), a teacher at the Deaf and Dumb School in Sydney; both parents were deaf. Rowley had a brother, Frank.

Richards was educated at Summer Hill Intermediate High School and Fort Street Boys High School. In 1933 he entered the University of Sydney, where he studied medicine, graduating in 1939. He also served in the Militia with the 1st Artillery Survey Company, reaching the rank of lieutenant on 4 September 1939. He completed his residency at Mater Hospital in North Sydney in 1940.

== Second World War ==
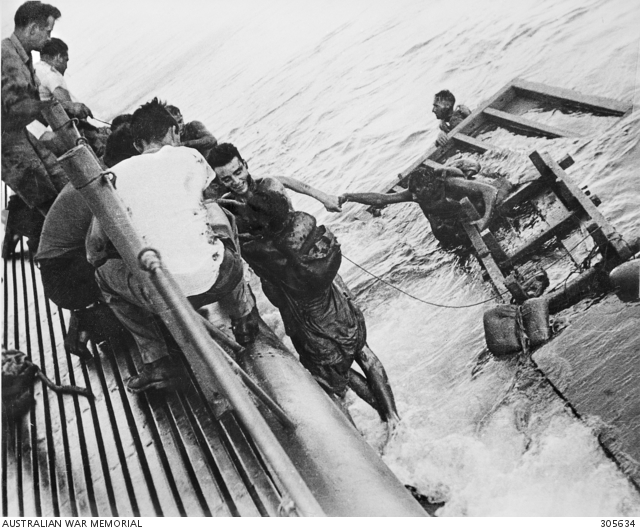
Submarine USS Sealion picking up surviving British and Australian prisoners who were on the Rakuyo Maru, a Japanese transport which it had sunk three days earlier

On 27 August 1940, Richards joined the Second Australian Imperial Force (AIF), and was allotted the AIF service number NX70273. He was appointed Regimental Medical Officer of the 2/15th Field Regiment, an artillery unit of the ill-fated 8th Division, on 18 November 1940, and embarked for Singapore with his unit on 29 July 1941. During the Malayan campaign, Richards coordinated the medical care for his unit, which fought gallantly but unsuccessfully to stem the Japanese advance on Singapore. He became a prisoner of war of the Japanese when Singapore fell on 15 February 1942.

Richards was initially held in Changi Prison. On 20 May 1942, he was part of 'A' Force, which sailed to Burma, where the prisoners initially worked on building and improving roads and airstrips. Over time they shifted to working on the notorious Burma Railway. The prisoners suffered from malnutrition, appalling conditions and tropical diseases, particularly cholera, malaria and dengue fever. There were casualties from Allied air attacks on the railway, and from brutal beatings administered by the Japanese and Korean guards. Richards and other medical officers struggled with a lack of supplies. He insisted on the strictest standards of hygiene, and kept a secret diary that he hoped would provide evidence against the Japanese in post-war war crimes trials.

In September 1944, Richards heard a rumour that he was to be transferred to Japan. He gave his diary to a friend, Major J. A. L. Shaw, and buried a summary with the body of Corporal S. R. Gorlick. The rumour was true; he left for Japan with a convoy of five escorts and six ships, including two carrying prisoners, 950 on the SS President Harrison, which had been captured by the Japanese and renamed the Kachidoki Maru, and 1,350 on the Rakuyo Maru. Richards travelled on the latter, which also carried senior officers including Brigadier Arthur Varley.

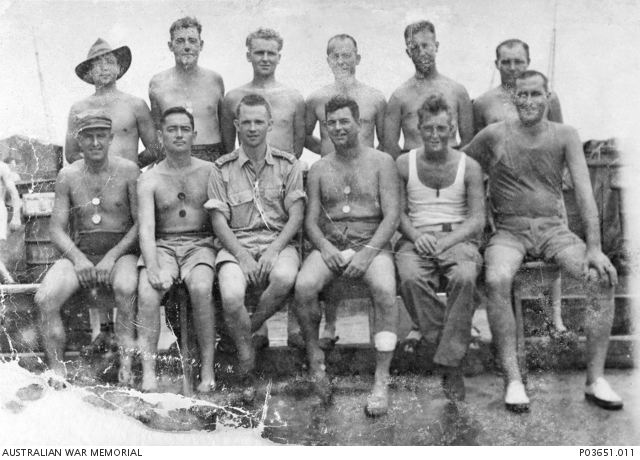
Australian survivors from the Sakata prisoner of war camp. Richards is front row, third from the left.

On the night of 11/12 September 1944, the convoy came under attack from an American submarine wolf pack consisting of the USS Growler, USS Sealion and USS Pampanito. They sank two of the escorts, the destroyer Shikinami and the frigate Hirado, and then the transports Rakuyo Maru, Nankai Maru and Kachidoki Maru, and an oil tanker. Kachidoki Maru sank in 20 minutes and most of the men on board had little chance, but none of the prisoners on the Rakuyo Maru were severely injured by the explosions and it took twelve hours to sink. On 15 September, Pampanito returned to the area and found British and Australian survivors. It picked up 73 of them. A call for assistance brought Sealion to the scene, and it collected 54 survivors. Two other submarines were sent to the area and picked up 32 more survivors.

Richards was the only officer on the Rakuyo Maru to survive. After three days in the water he was picked up by a Japanese warship, and was transferred to a whaling mother ship, which Richards took about other 600 prisoners rescued by the Japanese on to Japan. He was one of 261 British and 29 Australians who reached Sakata on 3 October 1944, and became their medical officer. While conditions were grim, they were not as horrific as on the Burma Railway, and a package of Red Cross medical supplies arrived on 1 January 1945. After being in the tropics, the prisoners now had to suffer the harsh Japanese winter, which caused a number of cases of pneumonia.

Released from captivity by the surrender of Japan in August 1945, Rowley returned to Australia in October 1945 on the British aircraft carrier HMS Formidable. Shaw returned his diary later that year, having kept it safe in the bottom of a billy. In 1947, the Directorate of Australian War Graves uncovered the buried summary in Gorlick's grave and returned it. As he had hoped, they were used to prosecute Japanese war criminals. For his services as a prisoner of war, he received a mention in despatches on 6 March 1947. He was awarded the Efficiency Decoration on 17 June 1948.

== Later life ==
Returning to civilian life, Richards became a medical officer at St Vincent's Hospital, Sydney. Here, he met a nurse, Beth McNab. They married in 1947, and had two sons, David and Ian. He subsequently established a successful private practice as a general practitioner and obstetrician. He served as chairman of the St John Ambulance Association in 1981. He also was involved in sports medicine. He was medical adviser to the Australian rowing teams at the 1968 Summer Olympics in Mexico City and 1972 Summer Olympics in Munich, and was honorary medical director of the City to Surf from 1977 to 1998, and later was an honorary medical consultant. He retired in 2000.

Richards became a Member of the Order of the British Empire in the Queen's Birthday Honours on 14 June 1969. He was awarded the Medal of the Order of Australia for his service to the city to Surf in the Queen's Birthday Honours on 13 June 1993, and the Centenary Medal for his service to the St John Ambulance Association on 1 January 2001. For many years, he served as the president of 2/15 Field Regiment Association and the 8th Australian Division Association. He wrote about his wartime experiences in The Survival Factor (1989) and A Doctor's War (2005). In the foreword to the latter, journalist Andrew Denton wrote: "Rowley was as good a man as this country has produced".

Richards died at Manly Hospital on 26 February 2015, and was cremated. He was survived by his son David, his wife Beth and son Ian having predeceased him. His papers, including the wartime diaries, are in the Australian War Memorial.

== Bibliography ==
- Richards, Rowley; McEwan, Marcia (1989). The Survival Factor. Kenhurst, New South Wales: Kangaroo Press. ISBN 9780864172464. OCLC 27591932.
- Richards, Rowley (2005). A Doctor's War. Sydney: HarperCollins. ISBN 9780732280086. OCLC 62561857.
