= Nam Tok Sai Yok Noi =

Nam Tok Sai Yok Noi น้ำตกไทรโยคน้อย Tarsoa
- Small town
- Nickname: Sai Yok Noi
- Location in Thailand
- Coordinates: 14°14′14″N 99°4′2″E
- Country: Thailand
- Province: Kanchanaburi Province
- District: Sai Yok District

Area
  - Total: 4.4 km^{2} (1.7 sq mi)

Population (2012)
  - Total: 3,675
  - Density: 840/km^{2} (2,200/sq mi)
- Time zone: UTC+7 (ICT)

Nam Tok Sai Yok Noi (Thai: น้ำตกไทรโยคน้อย, lit. 'small Sai Yok waterfall') is a small town (thesaban tambon) in Sai Yok District, Kanchanaburi Province, Thailand, along the route of the Death Railway linking Thailand with Burma. It is named after Sai Yok Noi Waterfall of Sai Yok National Park. During World War II, the small town was known as Tarsoa or Tarsau.

== History ==
The sanitary district (sukhaphiban) was created in 1971. It was upgraded to a township (thesaban tambon) in May 1999, when all of the sanitary districts were upgraded. As of 2012, the town had a population of 3,675, and covered an area of 4.4 km^{2} of subdistrict (tambon) Tha Sao.

=== Camp Tarsoa ===
Camp Tarsoa was a large Japanese prisoner of war camp constructed during World War II. It consisted of a transit camp, a work camp and a hospital camp, and was founded on 24 January 1943. The work camp originally contained 400 prisoners, but was enlarged to 800 prisoners. The hospital had a very bad reputation and hardly any medical supplies. There were three large cemeteries near the camp, one of which was for deaths from cholera. The camps closed in April 1944.

Australian prisoners of war veterans erected a memorial at Hellfire Pass, and each year on 25 April, there is a memorial ceremony. Hellfire Pass is located 27 kilometres (17 mi) from Nam Tok.
