= Jim Bradley (British Army officer) =

British Army officer (1911–2003)

James Bottomley Bradley, MBE (17 June 1911 – 19 May 2003) was born in Stalybridge, Cheshire. He received his formal education at Arnold House, Llandulas followed by Oundle and Christ's College, Cambridge, where he read engineering.

When war broke out Bradley was a lieutenant with the Sappers. He had only briefly seen action when Singapore fell in 1942. After being captured, he spent 14 months in Changi Jail. He subsequently, after months of mistreatment and taking part in forced marches that few survived and working on the building of the Burma–Thailand railway, took part in a remarkable escape from a Japanese prisoner-of-war camp in 1943. He and four others were the only PoWs to survive an escape attempt in Thailand during the Second World War. He was recaptured by the Japanese and, surprisingly, was not executed. He was liberated in September 1945.

After the war, unable to continue as an engineer, he became a farmer near Petworth, West Sussex. He retired in 1977 to Midhurst. In 1949 Bradley was appointed MBE in recognition of his escape attempt. He rarely spoke about his wartime experiences but in 1982 was persuaded to write an account of his experiences which were published as Towards The Setting Sun: An Escape from the Thailand-Burma Railway, 1943.

Bradley married firstly Lindsay Walker in 1936. She died in 1969. In 1970 he married Lindy Corfield. He died on 19 May 2003, aged 91.

His story was more widely publicised in 2016 when Ray Mears told his story as part of his tour 'Tales of Endurance'.
