= Wang Pho Viaduct =

Wang Pho Viaduct Tham Krasae Railway Bridge
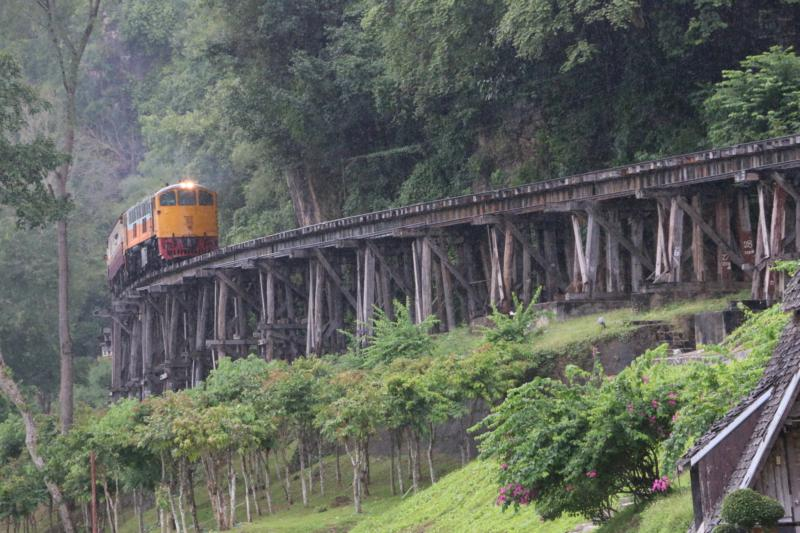
- Wang Pho Viaduct (2014)
- Coordinates: 14.1016°N 99.1667°E
- Carries: Burma Railway
- Locale: Sai Yok, Kanchanaburi

Characteristics
- Material: Wooden trestle
- Total length: 400 metres (1,312 ft)

History
- Construction start: March 1943
- Construction end: April 1943
- Opened: April 1943

The Wang Pho Viaduct, also Wampo Viaduct or Tham Krasae Railway Bridge (Thai: สะพานถ้ำกระแซ, romanized: S̄aphān t̄ĥả krasæ) is a railway bridge made of wooden trestles which follow the cliff along the Khwae Noi River. The Wang Pho viaduct was constructed by allied prisoners of war of the Japanese during World War II as part of the Burma Railway. It is sometimes referred as the Double Viaduct, because of a nearby smaller viaduct. The viaduct is still in use and can be reached from the Wang Pho railway station.

== History ==
In 1939, plans had been developed by the Empire of Japan to construct a railway connecting Thailand with Burma. Construction of the Burma Railway started on 16 September 1942. At kilometre 111, the line met with a massive cliff, and it was decided to build a trestle bridge which follows the cliff along the Khwae Noi River.

During the construction of the Bridge on the River Khwae Yai prisoners were transported to the site. By now, it was decided that they had to walk to their camp sites. In March 1943, 700 British, 600 Australian, 450 Dutch prisoners of war and 100 Thai forced labourers were assigned to the task. They were placed in three work camps, and had to work in two shifts of about 1,000 prisoners. During the first blast with dynamite part of the cliff collapsed killing many prisoners. The sheer drop also resulted in many falling to their death. During the wet season, the ground became soggy causing instability and collapse.

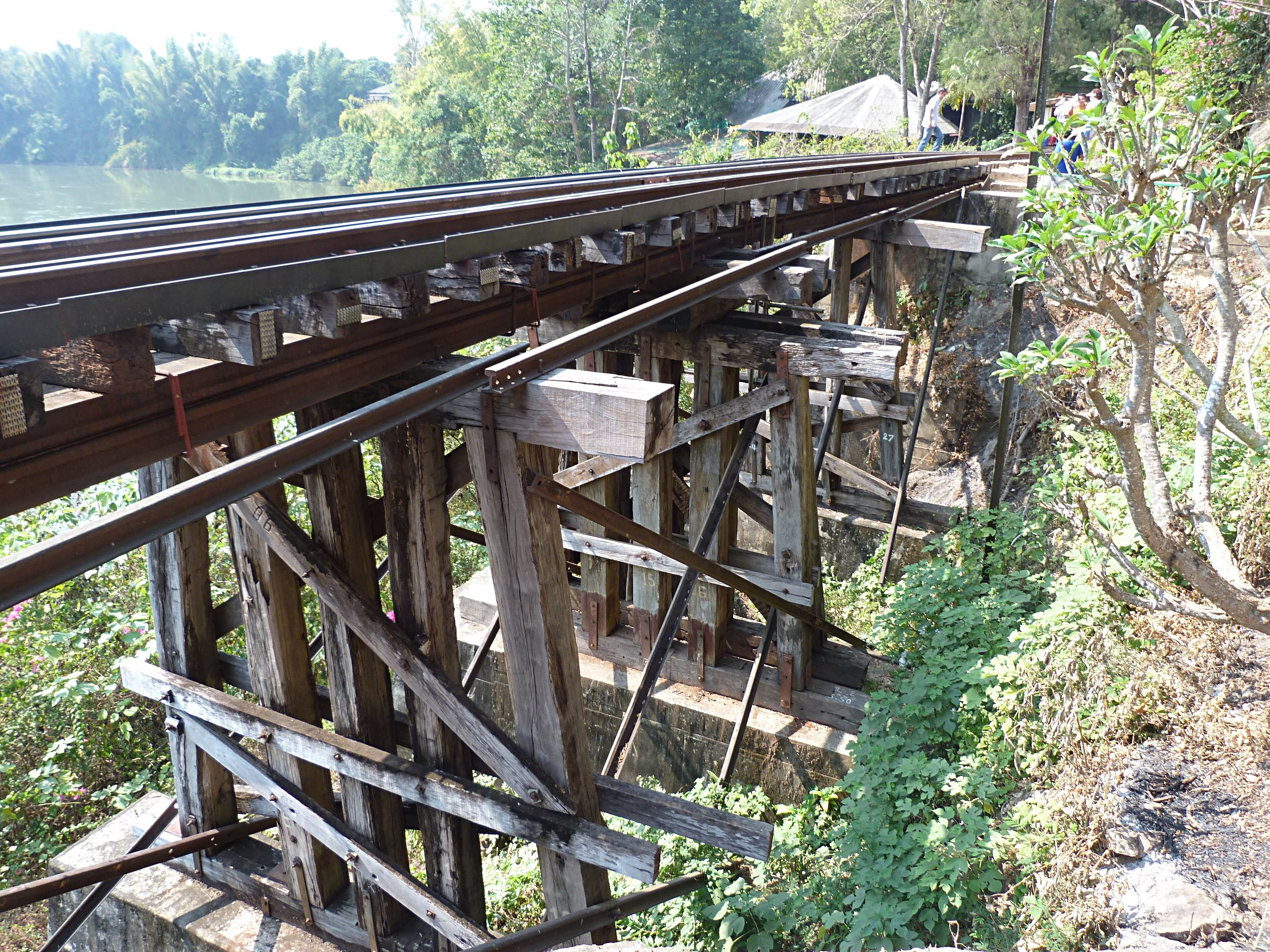

The Wang Pho Viaduct was finished in April 1943 after 17 days and nights of construction. The viaduct, which has been extensively repaired and strengthened, is still in use today, and has become a tourist attraction.

The Krasae Cave is located along the viaduct, and was also constructed by the prisoners of war. It is open for visitors and has become a Buddhist temple.

In December 1944, prisoners of war returned to the site to construct a road from Wang Pho to Tavoy. It was a three metres wide road through the jungle with a length of 110 kilometres (68 mi) as the crow flies. The road was completed on 5 June 1945.
