= Aviation Academy railway halt =

Railway halt in Thailand

Aviation Academy โรงเรียนการบิน

General information
- Other names: Rong Rian Kanbin
- Location: Tambon Kratip, Amphoe Kamphaeng Saen; Nakhon Pathom Province; Thailand
- Coordinates: 14.08647°N 99.95633°E
- Operator: State Railway of Thailand
- Manager: Ministry of Transport
- Line: Suphanburi Line
- Platforms: 2
- Tracks: 1

Construction
- Structure type: At grade

Other information
- Classification: Halt

Services
Preceding station	State Railway of Thailand	Following station
Thung Bua Halt towards Nong Pladuk Junction	Southern Line Suphan Buri Line	Sri Samran towards Suphan Buri or Ma Lai Maen Halt

Former services
Preceding station	State Railway of Thailand	Following station
Nong Fak Halt towards Nong Pladuk Junction	Suphan Buri Branch	Ban Pho Ngam Halt towards Suphan Buri
Location

Aviation Academy halt (Thai: ที่หยุดรถโรงเรียนการบิน, RTGS: Thi Yut Rot Rong Rian Kanbin) is a railway station on the Suphanburi Line located in Kamphaeng Saen Aviation Academy, Amphoe Kamphaeng Saen, Nakhon Pathom Province, Thailand. There are two platforms, on both sides of the track. The station is now operational and two trains stop at it.
