= Kanchanaburi railway station =

Railway station in Kanchanaburi, Thailand

Coordinates: 14.0342°N 99.5253°E

Kanchanaburi กาญจนบุรี
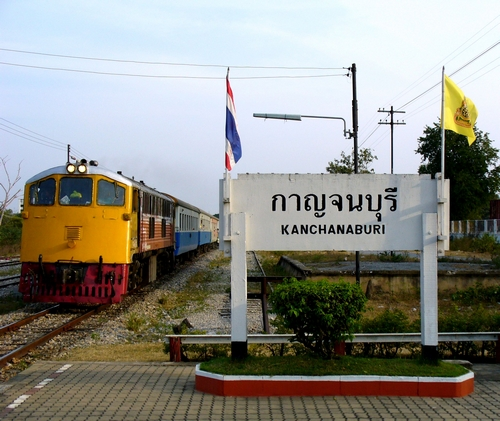

General information
- Location: Ban Tai Subdistrict, Mueang Kanchanaburi District; Kanchanaburi Province; Thailand
- Operator: State Railway of Thailand
- Manager: Ministry of Transport
- Distance: 117.046 km (72.7 mi) from Thon Buri
- Platforms: 2
- Tracks: 4

Construction
- Structure type: At-grade

Other information
- Station code: กญ.
- Classification: Class 1

History
- Opened: 1942
- Rebuilt: 24 June 1949

Services
Preceding station	State Railway of Thailand	Following station
Pak Phraek Halt towards Nong Pladuk Junction	Southern Line Burma Railway	Saphan Khwae Yai towards Nam Tok Sai Yok Noi Halt
Location

Kanchanaburi railway station is a main railway station of province of Kanchanaburi located in Ban Tai Subdistrict, Kanchanaburi City, Thailand. It is a class 1 railway station located 117.046 km (72.7 mi) from Thon Buri railway station, and 77 km (47.8 mi) away from the Nam Tok railway station, the terminal station. The line opened in 1942 by the Imperial Japanese Army, during the Second World War. After the war, the State Railway of Thailand bought the line from the Allied powers, and the station reopened on June 24, 1949, from Nong Pladuk Junction.

== Train services ==
- Ordinary 257/258 Thon Buri–Nam Tok–Thon Buri
- Ordinary 259/260 Thon Buri–Nam Tok–Thon Buri
- Local 485/486 Nong Pladuk–Nam Tok–Nong Pladuk

A special excursion train 909/910 Bangkok–Nam Tok–Bangkok that originates from Bangkok railway station (Hua Lamphong) every Saturday–Sunday and public holidays through this station as well.
