= Kamphaeng Saen railway halt =

Former railway station in Thailand

Kamphaeng Saen กำแพงแสน
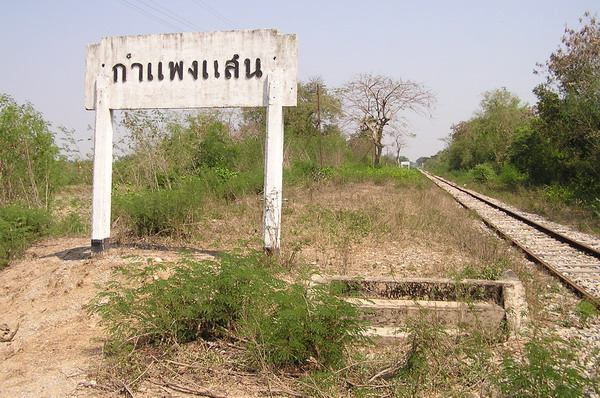

General information
- Location: Tambon Huai Mon Thong, Amphoe Kamphaeng Saen, Nakhon Pathom Province, Thailand
- Coordinates: 13.9882°N 99.9539°E
- Owner: State Railway of Thailand
- Line: Suphanburi Line
- Platforms: 1 (unused)
- Tracks: 1

Construction
- Structure type: At grade

History
- Closed: December 15, 1976

Former services
Preceding station	State Railway of Thailand	Following station
Don Khun Wiset Halt towards Nong Pladuk Junction	Suphan Buri Branch	Thung Bua Halt towards Suphan Buri
Location

Kamphaeng Saen station (Thai: สถานีกำแพงแสน) was a railway station on the Suphanburi Line, located in Tambon Huai Mon Thong, Amphoe Kamphaeng Saen, Nakhon Pathom Province, Thailand. The station was changed from a station to a halt on December 15, 1976. There were two platforms, 200 metres in length and the track on platform 2 was 600 metres long. No trains stop here.

Similarly to Yang Prasat and Don Khun Wiset stations, there are platforms on both sides of the track.
