= Wang Pho railway station =

Railway station in Thailand

Wang Pho วังโพ
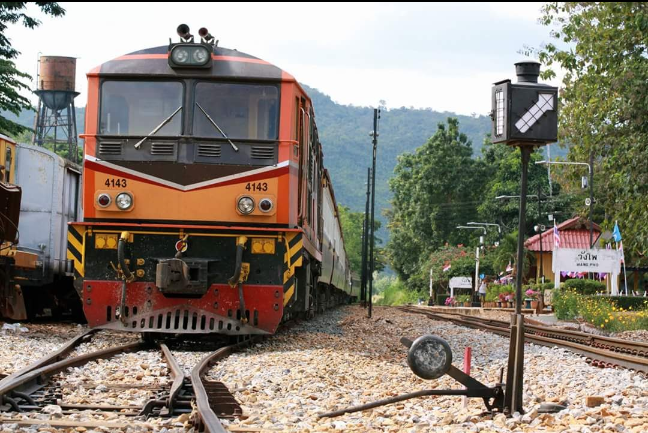

General information
- Location: Lumsum Subdistrict, Sai Yok District; Kanchanaburi Province; Thailand
- Coordinates: 14.1202°N 99.1396°E
- Operator: State Railway of Thailand
- Line: Nam Tok Line (Death Railway)
- Distance: 178.10 km (110.7 mi) from Bangkok
- Platforms: 1
- Tracks: 2

Construction
- Structure type: At-grade

Other information
- Station code: วง.
- Classification: Class 2

History
- Opened: 1 April 1952

Services
Preceding station	State Railway of Thailand	Following station
Saphan Tham Krasae Halt towards Nong Pladuk Junction	Southern Line Burma Railway	Ko Maha Mongkol Halt towards Nam Tok Sai Yok Noi Halt
Location

Wang Pho railway station is a railway station located in Lumsum Subdistrict, Sai Yok District, Kanchanaburi Province, Thailand. It is a class 2 railway station located 178.10 km (110.7 mi) from Bangkok railway station. The station was reopened on 1 April 1952 as part of reopening section of Kanchanaburi-Wang Pho. And would serve as the terminus until the last section to Nam Tok station reopened on 1 July 1958
