= Don Khun Wiset railway halt =

Former railway station in Thailand

Don Khun Wiset ดอนขุนวิเศษ
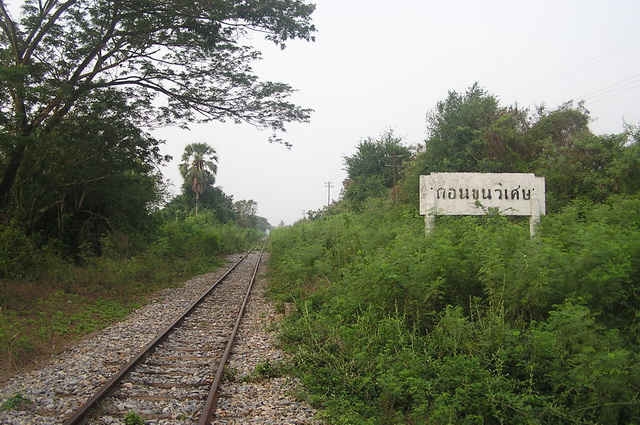

General information
- Location: Tambon Huai Mon Thong, Amphoe Kamphaeng Saen, Nakhon Pathom Province, Thailand
- Coordinates: 13°56′47″N 99°56′32″E
- Owner: State Railway of Thailand
- Line: Suphanburi Line
- Platforms: 1 (unused)
- Tracks: 1

Construction
- Structure type: At grade

Other information
- Fare zone: Nakhon Pathom Maintenance Zone

History
- Closed: March 1, 1977

Former services
Preceding station	State Railway of Thailand	Following station
Yang Prasat Halt towards Nong Pladuk Junction	Suphan Buri Branch	Kamphaeng Saen Halt towards Suphan Buri
Location

Don Khun Wiset Halt (Thai: ที่หยุดรถดอนขุนวิเศษ) was a railway station on the Suphanburi Line, located in Tambon Huai Mon Thong, Amphoe Kamphaeng San, Nakhon Pathom Province, Thailand. The station was changed from a station to a halt on March 1, 1977. There was only one platform, 200 metres in length. No trains now stop at the station.
