= Thung Bua railway halt =

Railway halt in Rang Phikun, Thailand

Thung Bua ทุ่งบัว
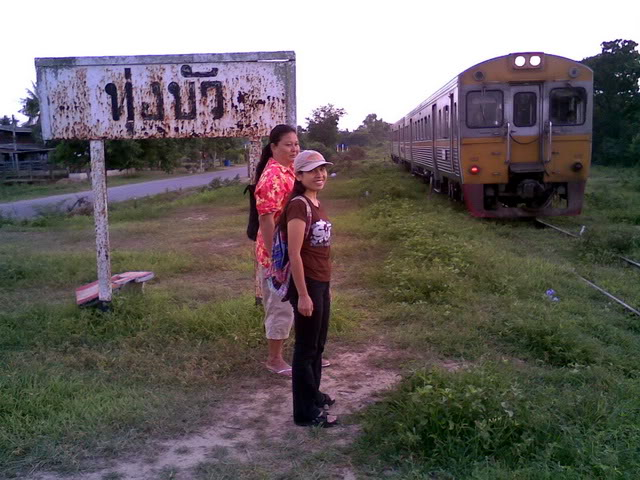

General information
- Location: Tambon Rang Pikul, Amphoe Kamphaeng Saen, Nakhon Pathom Province, Thailand
- Coordinates: 14.0109°N 99.9558°E
- Owner: State Railway of Thailand
- Operator: State Railway of Thailand
- Line: Suphanburi Line
- Platforms: 1
- Tracks: 1

Construction
- Structure type: At grade

History
- Opened: September 3, 1984

Services
Preceding station	State Railway of Thailand	Following station
Nong Pladuk Junction Terminus	Southern Line Suphan Buri Line	Aviation Academy Halt towards Suphan Buri or Ma Lai Maen Halt

Former services
Preceding station	State Railway of Thailand	Following station
Kamphaeng Saen Halt towards Nong Pladuk Junction	Suphan Buri Branch	Nong Fak Halt towards Suphan Buri
Location

Thung Bua Halt Railway Station is a railway station on the Suphanburi Line located in Tambon Rang Pikul, Amphoe Kamphaeng Saen, Nakhon Pathom Province, Thailand. There is only one platform, on the west side of the track. The station is now operational and there are two trains stop at it.

Thung Bua was opened on September 3, 1984. It is the nearest station of Kasetsart University Kamphaengsaen Campus.
