= Nong Fak railway halt =

Former train station

Nong Fak หนองฟัก
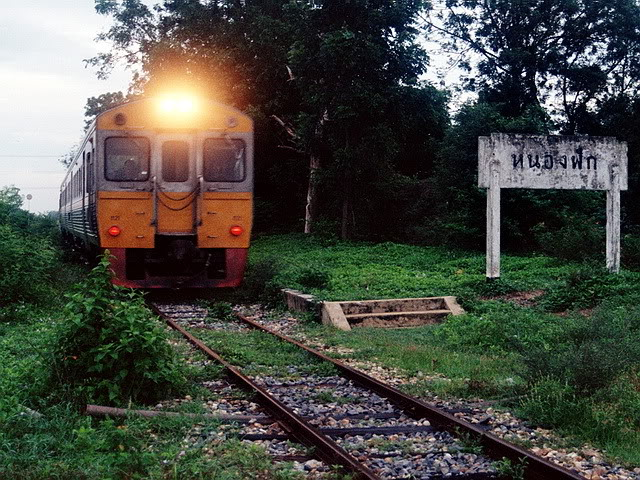

General information
- Location: Tambon Thung Bua, Amphoe Kamphaeng Saen, Nakhon Pathom Province, Thailand
- Coordinates: 14.05696°N 99.95624°E
- Owner: State Railway of Thailand
- Line: Suphanburi Line
- Platforms: 1 (unused)
- Tracks: 1

Construction
- Structure type: At grade

History
- Closed: ?
- Former names: Thung Khwang

Former services
Preceding station	State Railway of Thailand	Following station
Thung Bua Halt towards Nong Pladuk Junction	Suphan Buri Branch	Aviation Academy Halt towards Suphan Buri
Location

Nong Fak halt (Thai: ที่หยุดรถหนองฟัก), original name Thung Khwang halt (Thai: ที่หยุดรถทุ่งขวาง) was a railway station on the Suphanburi Line located in Tambon Thung Bua, Amphoe Kamphaeng Saen, Nakhon Pathom Province, Thailand. There was only one platform, on the east side of the track. The station is now closed and no trains stop at it.

Nong Fak was originally named Thung Khwang.
