= Ban Thung Khai railway halt =

Railway halt in Cha-uat, Thailand

Coordinates: 8.01436°N 99.97694°E

Ban Thung Khai บ้านทุ่งค่าย

General information
- Location: Mu 7 (Ban Thung Khai), Cha-uat Subdistrict, Cha-uat District, Nakhon Si Thammarat
- Owner: State Railway of Thailand
- Line: Southern Line
- Platforms: 1
- Tracks: 1

Other information
- Station code: น ่.

Services
Preceding station	State Railway of Thailand	Following station
Ban Tun towards Hua Lamphong or Krung Thep Aphiwat	Southern Line	Cha-uat towards Su-ngai Kolok
Location

Ban Thung Khai Halt (Thai: ที่หยุดรถบ้านทุ่งค่าย) is a railway halt located in Cha-uat Subdistrict, Cha-uat District, Nakhon Si Thammarat. It is located 802.85 km (498.9 mi) from Thon Buri Railway Station

== Train services ==
- Local No. 445/446 Chumphon-Hat Yai Junction-Chumphon
- Local No. 447/448 Surat Thani-Sungai Kolok-Surat Thani
- Local No. 457/458 Nakhon Si Thammarat-Phatthalung-Nakhon Si Thammarat
