= Ban Tun railway station =

Railway station in Ban Tun, Thailand

Ban Tun บ้านตูล

General information
- Location: Ban Tun Subdistrict, Cha-uat District, Nakhon Si Thammarat
- Coordinates: 8.0606°N 99.9612°E
- Owner: State Railway of Thailand
- Line: Southern Line
- Platforms: 1
- Tracks: 2

Other information
- Station code: ตน.

Services
Preceding station	State Railway of Thailand	Following station
Khuan Nong Khwa towards Hua Lamphong or Krung Thep Aphiwat	Southern Line	Ban Thung Khai Halt towards Su-ngai Kolok
Location

Ban Tun station (Thai: สถานีบ้านตูล) is a railway station located in Ban Tun Subdistrict, Cha-uat District, Nakhon Si Thammarat. It is a class 3 railway station located 794.949 km (494.0 mi) from Thon Buri railway station.

== Train services ==
- Local No. 445/446 Chumphon-Hat Yai Junction-Chumphon
- Local No. 447/448 Surat Thani-Sungai Kolok-Surat Thani
- Local No. 451/452 Nakhon Si Thammarat-Sungai Kolok-Nakhon Si Thammarat
- Local No. 455/456 Nakhon Si Thammarat-Yala-Nakhon Si Thammarat
- Local No. 457/458 Nakhon Si Thammarat-Phatthalung-Nakhon Si Thammarat
