= Khuan Nong Khwa railway station =

Railway station in Khuan Nong Khwa, Thailand

Khuan Nong Khwa ควนหนองคว้า

General information
- Location: Khuan Nong Khwa Subdistrict, Chulabhorn District, Nakhon Si Thammarat
- Coordinates: 8.1043°N 99.9370°E
- Owner: State Railway of Thailand
- Line: Southern Line
- Platforms: 1
- Tracks: 2

Other information
- Station code: คว.

Services
Preceding station	State Railway of Thailand	Following station
Khao Chum Thong Junction towards Hua Lamphong or Krung Thep Aphiwat	Southern Line	Ban Tun towards Su-ngai Kolok
Location

Khuan Nong Khwa railway station is a railway station located in Khuan Nong Khwa Subdistrict, Chulabhorn District, Nakhon Si Thammarat. It is a class 3 railway station located 789.383 km (490.5 mi) from Thon Buri railway station.

== Train services ==
- Local No. 445/446 Chumphon-Hat Yai Junction-Chumphon
- Local No. 447/448 Surat Thani-Sungai Kolok-Surat Thani
- Local No. 451/452 Nakhon Si Thammarat-Sungai Kolok-Nakhon Si Thammarat
- Local No. 455/456 Nakhon Si Thammarat-Yala-Nakhon Si Thammarat
- Local No. 457/458 Nakhon Si Thammarat-Phatthalung-Nakhon Si Thammarat
