= Cha-uat railway station =

Railway station in Cha-uat, Thailand

Cha-uat ชะอวด

General information
- Location: National Highway No.4018, Cha-uat Subdistrict, Nakhon Si Thammarat
- Coordinates: 7.9674°N 99.9975°E
- Owner: State Railway of Thailand
- Line: Southern Line
- Platforms: 1
- Tracks: 3

Other information
- Station code: ชด.

History
- Former names: Tha Samet

Services
Preceding station	State Railway of Thailand	Following station
Ban Thung Khai Halt towards Hua Lamphong or Krung Thep Aphiwat	Southern Line	Nong Jik Halt towards Su-ngai Kolok
Location

Cha-uat station (Thai: สถานีชะอวด) is a railway station located in Cha-uat Subdistrict, Cha-uat District, Nakhon Si Thammarat. it is a class 2 railway station, located 806.069 km (500.9 mi) from Thon Buri railway station.

== Train services ==
- Special Express No.37/38 Bangkok-Sungai Kolok-Bangkok
- Rapid No. 169/170 Bangkok-Yala-Bangkok
- Rapid No. 171/172 Bangkok-Sungai Kolok-Bangkok
- Local No. 445/446 Chumphon-Hat Yai Junction-Chumphon
- Local No. 447/448 Surat Thani-Sungai Kolok-Surat Thani
- Local No. 451/452 Nakhon Si Thammarat-Sungai Kolok-Nakhon Si Thammarat
- Local No. 455/456 Nakhon Si Thammarat-Yala-Nakhon Si Thammarat
- Local No. 457/458 Nakhon Si Thammarat-Phatthalung-Nakhon Si Thammarat
