= Chong Khao railway station =

Railway station in Tham Yai, Thailand

Chong Khao ช่องเขา

General information
- Location: Tham Yai Subdistrict, Thung Song District, Nakhon Si Thammarat
- Owner: State Railway of Thailand
- Line: Southern Line
- Platforms: 1
- Tracks: 2

Other information
- Station code: ชข.

Services
Preceding station	State Railway of Thailand	Following station
Sai Yai towards Hua Lamphong or Krung Thep Aphiwat	Southern Line	Ron Phibun towards Su-ngai Kolok
Location

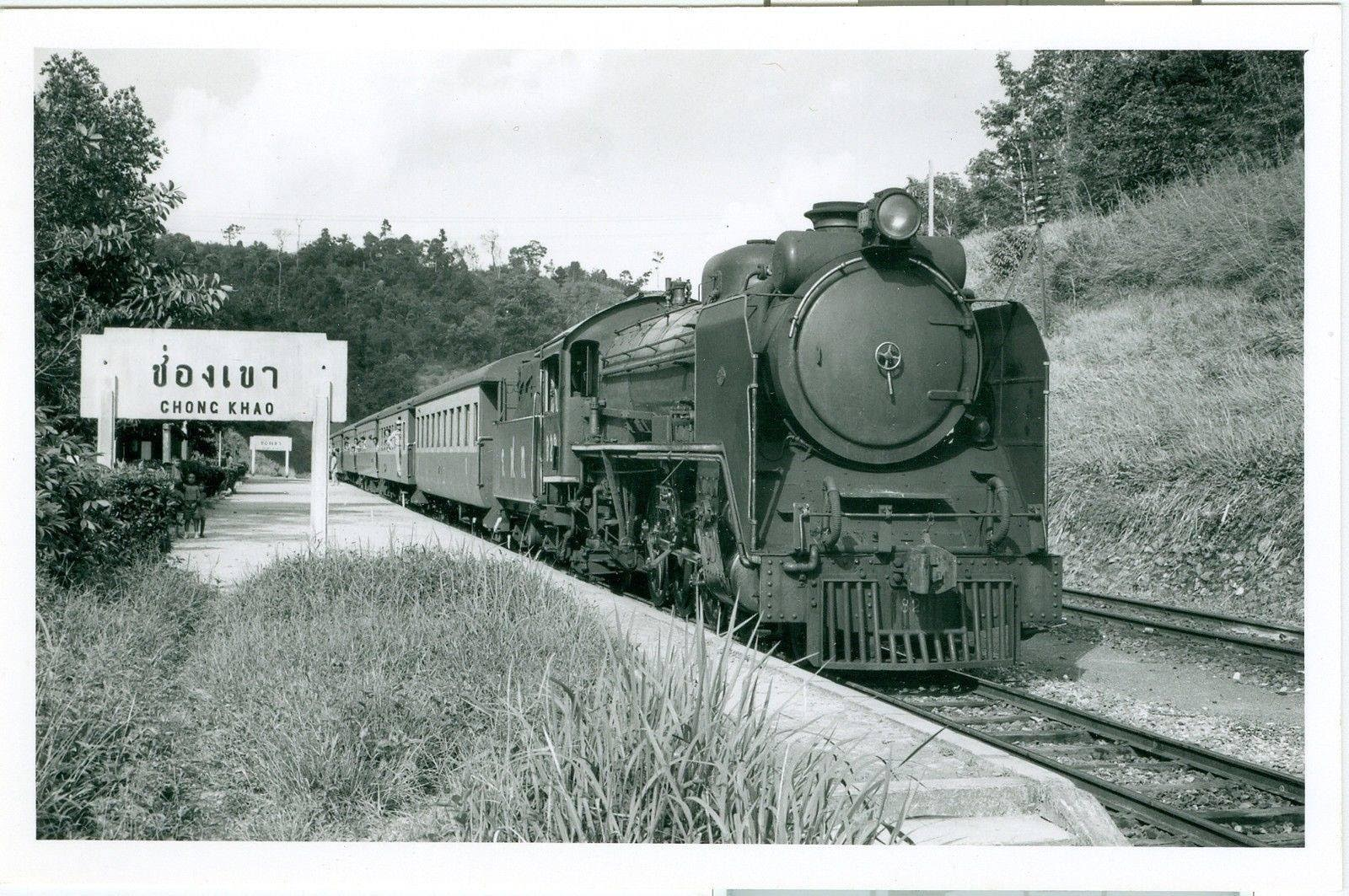
The Chong Khao station in the 60s

Chong Khao station (Thai: สถานีช่องเขา) is a railway station located in Tham Yai Subdistrict, Thung Song District, Nakhon Si Thammarat. It is a class 3 railway station located 767.786 km (477.1 mi) from Thon Buri railway station. It is located adjacent to the Chong Khao Tunnel.

== Train services ==
- Local No. 445/446 Chumphon-Hat Yai Junction-Chumphon
- Local No. 447/448 Surat Thani-Sungai Kolok-Surat Thani
