= Sai Yai railway station =

Railway station in Tham Yai, Thailand

Sai Yai ใสใหญ่

General information
- Location: Thung Song-Nakhon Si Thammarat Road, Mu 7 (Ban Sai Yai), Tham Yai Subdistrict, Thung Song District, Nakhon Si Thammarat
- Coordinates: 8.1604°N 99.7214°E
- Owner: State Railway of Thailand
- Line: Southern Line
- Platforms: 1
- Tracks: 2

Other information
- Station code: สใ.

Services
Preceding station	State Railway of Thailand	Following station
Thung Song Junction towards Hua Lamphong or Krung Thep Aphiwat	Southern Line	Chong Khao towards Su-ngai Kolok
Location

Sai Yai railway station is a railway station located in Tham Yai Subdistrict, Thung Song District, Nakhon Si Thammarat. It is a class 3 railway station located 762 km (473.5 mi) from Thon Buri railway station.

== Train services ==
- Local No. 445/446 Chumphon-Hat Yai Junction-Chumphon
- Local No. 447/448 Surat Thani-Sungai Kolok-Surat Thani
