= Ron Phibun railway station =

Railway station in Ron Phibun, Thailand

Ron Phibun ร่อนพิบูลย์

General information
- Location: National Highway No. 403, Ron Phibun Subdistrict, Ron Phibun District, Nakhon Si Thammarat
- Coordinates: 8.1542°N 99.8407°E
- Owner: State Railway of Thailand
- Line: Southern Line
- Platforms: 1
- Tracks: 3

Other information
- Station code: รบ.

Services
Preceding station	State Railway of Thailand	Following station
Chong Khao towards Hua Lamphong or Krung Thep Aphiwat	Southern Line	Khao Chum Thong Junction towards Su-ngai Kolok
Location

Ron Phibun railway station is a railway station located in Ron Phibun Subdistrict, Ron Phibun District, Nakhon Si Thammarat. It is a class 2 railway station located 776.333 km (482.4 mi) from Thon Buri railway station.

== Train services ==
- Local No. 445/446 Chumphon-Hat Yai Junction-Chumphon
- Local No. 447/448 Surat Thani-Sungai Kolok-Surat Thani
