= Khiri Rat Nikhom railway station =

Railway station in Tha Khanon, Thailand

Coordinates: 9.0314°N 98.9472°E

Khiri Rat Nikhom คีรีรัฐนิคม

General information
- Location: Tha Khanon Subdistrict, Khiri Rat Nikhom District; Surat Thani Province; Thailand
- Operator: State Railway of Thailand
- Manager: Ministry of Transport
- Line: Khiri Rat Nikhom Branch
- Distance: 662.0 km (411.3 mi) from Thon Buri
- Platforms: 1
- Tracks: 2

Construction
- Structure type: At-grade

Other information
- Station code: รค.
- Classification: Class 3

History
- Opened: April 1956
- Former names: Tha Khanon

Services
Preceding station	State Railway of Thailand	Following station
Terminus	Southern Line Khiri Rat Nikhom Branch	Ban Yang Halt towards Ban Thung Pho Junction
Location

Khiri Rat Nikhom railway station is a railway station located in Tha Khanon Subdistrict, Khiri Rat Nikhom District, Surat Thani. The station is a class 3 railway station and is located 662.0 km (411.3 mi) from Thon Buri railway station. It opened in April 1956, on the Southern Line section from Ban Thung Pho Junction–Khiri Rat Nikhom. The railway line was originally planned to reach Tanun (North of Phuket) in Phang Nga, via Phang Nga City, Phanom and Ban Ta Khun, however the plan was scrapped. Currently, there are plans to restart the plan and continue building to Tanun to connect to Phuket and Phang Nga.

== Train services ==
- Local train No. 489 / 490 Surat Thani–Khiri Rat Nikhom–Surat Thani
