= Khao Chum Thong Junction railway station =

Railway station in Thailand

Coordinates: 8.1479°N 99.8822°E

Khao Chum Thong Junction ชุมทางเขาชุมทอง
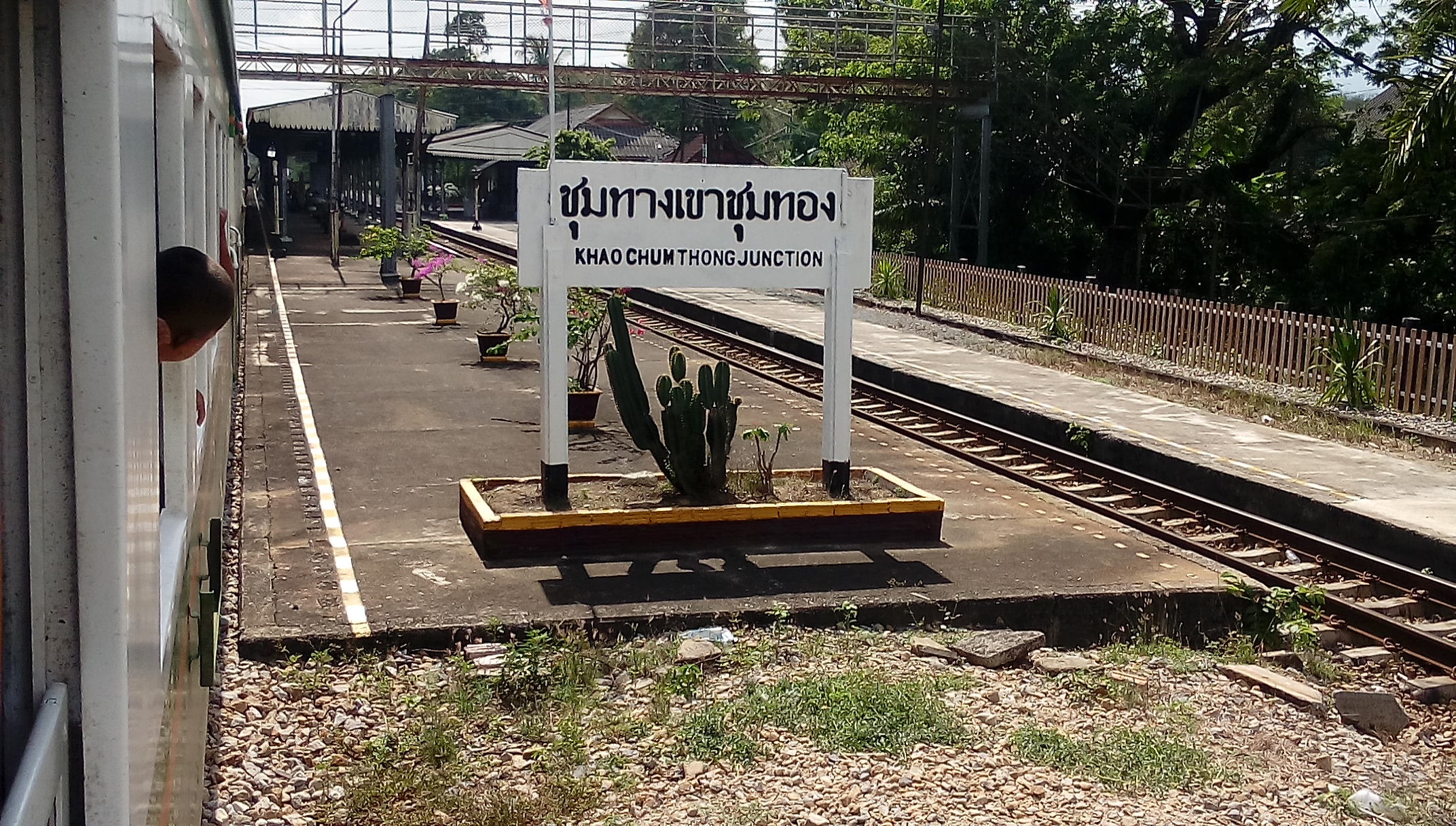
- Sign of station

General information
- Location: National Highway No.4018, Khuan Koei Subdistrict, Ron Phibun District; Nakhon Si Thammarat Province; Thailand
- Operator: State Railway of Thailand
- Manager: Ministry of Transport
- Lines: Su-ngai Kolok Main Line; Nakhon Si Thammarat Branch
- Platforms: 2
- Tracks: 6

Construction
- Structure type: At-grade

Other information
- Station code: ชท.
- Classification: Class 2

History
- Opened: October 1914
- Former names: Sam Yaek Nakhon

Services
Preceding station	State Railway of Thailand	Following station
Ron Phibun towards Hua Lamphong or Krung Thep Aphiwat	Southern Line	Khuan Nong Khwa towards Su-ngai Kolok
Terminus	Southern Line Nakhon Si Thammarat Branch	Ban Koei Chen Halt towards Nakhon Si Thammarat
Location

Khao Chum Thong Junction railway station is a railway station located in Khuan Koei Subdistrict, Ron Phibun District, Nakhon Si Thammarat. The station is a class 2 railway station, located 781.018 km (485.3 mi) from Thon Buri railway station. This station is the junction for the Southern Line mainline and the Nakhon Si Thammarat Branch Line.

== History ==
Khao Chum Thong Junction opened as a junction railway station in October 1914, along the Thung Song Junction–Phatthalung section of the Southern Line. Initially, the station was called "Sam Yaek Nakhon" (lit. Three-way Junction for Nakhon [Si Thammarat]). Later the name was changed to the current name in 1917, under the orders of King Vajiravudh.

In the past Khao Chum Thong was a station that all trains must stop as it was a water and wood fueling station. However, these facilities were removed in 1982, when no more steam locomotives were used.

== Train services ==
- Express train No. 85 / 86 Bangkok–Nakhon Si Thammarat–Bangkok
- Rapid train No. 169 / 170 Bangkok–Yala–Bangkok
- Rapid train No. 173 / 174 Bangkok–Nakhon Si Thammarat–Bangkok
- Local train No. 445 / 446 Chumphon–Hat Yai–Chumphon
- Local train No. 447 / 448 Surat Thani–Sungai Kolok–Surat Thani
- Local train No. 451/452 Nakhon Si Thammarat–Sungai Kolok–Nakhon Si Thammarat
- Local train No. 455/456 Nakhon Si Thammarat–Yala–Nakhon Si Thammarat
- Local train No. 457/458 Nakhon Si Thammarat–Phatthalung–Nakhon Si Thammarat

== In popular culture ==
This junction railway station was cited in the 1965 Thai action film Chum Thang Khao Chum Thong as a backdrop of story and the theme song, which shares the same Thai title as the film and was performed by Rapin Phutai, also became a memorable luk thung (Thai country song) hit.
