= Suphan Buri Line =

Railway line in Western Thailand

Suphanburi Line
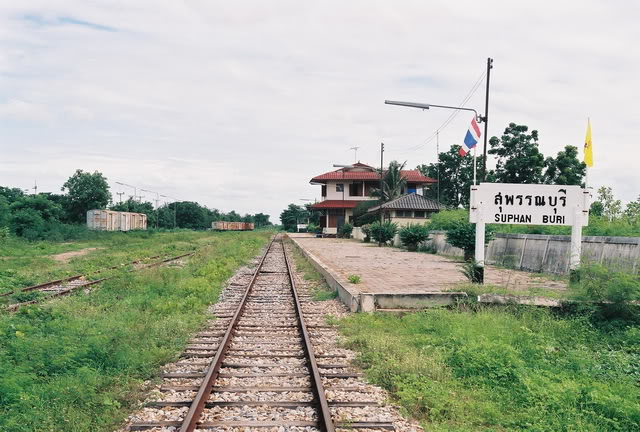
- Suphan Buri railway station

Overview
- Status: Operational
- Locale: Western Thailand
- Termini: Nong Pladuk; Malai Maen Halt
- Continues from: Southern Line
- Stations: 16

Service
- Type: Commuter rail
- System: Greater Bangkok commuter rail
- Services: Hua Lamphong–Suphan Buri
- Operator: State Railway of Thailand

History
- Opened: 16 June 1963

Technical
- Line length: 78 km (48 mi)
- Number of tracks: 1
- Track gauge: 1,000 mm (3 ft 3 3/8 in) metre gauge
- Electrification: None

Suphan Buri Line is a railway line in Western Thailand, opened on 16 June 1963, by Prime Minister Sarit Thanarat. There were initially 16 stations, but only seven stations now remain in operation. The line branches off from the Southern Line.

The line was originally planned as a bypass route passing through Ang Thong Province and crossing the Chao Phraya River to connect with the Northern and Northeastern Lines at Ban Phachi Junction, but construction was halted before it reached that point.

Only one train runs daily on this route. It departs Bangkok at 4:40 p.m. and arrives in Suphan Buri at 7:40 p.m. The return trip leaves Suphan Buri at 4:40 a.m. and reaches Bangkok at 8:10 a.m.

== Stations ==
English name	Thai Name	Code	Distance in km	Class	Thai abbr.	Note	Location
Nong Pladuk	หนองปลาดุก	4020	64.19	4	ปด.		Ratchaburi
Yang Prasat	ยางประสาท	4022	71.60	Halt	ยะ.	Closed	Nakhon Pathom
Don Khun Wiset	ดอนขุนวิเศษ	4024	80.50	Halt	ดส.	Closed	Nakhon Pathom
Kamphaeng Saen	กำแพงแสน	4025	85.30	Halt	กำ.	Closed	Nakhon Pathom
Thung Bua	ทุ่งบัว	4026	87.86	Halt			Nakhon Pathom
Nong Fak	หนองฟัก	4027	93.00	Halt	นฟ.	Closed	Nakhon Pathom
Aviation Academy (Rong Rien Kanbin)	โรงเรียนการบิน	4028	96.46	Halt			Nakhon Pathom
Ban Pho Ngam	บ้านโพธิ์งาม	4029	96.69	Halt		Closed	Nakhon Pathom
Thale Bok	ทะเลบก	4030		Halt	ทะ.	Closed	Suphan Buri
Nong Wan Priang	หนองวัลย์เปรียง	4031	104.97	Halt	หเ.	Closed	Suphan Buri
Saphang Khoen	สะพังเขิน	4032		Halt		Closed since 1966	Suphan Buri
Sri Samran	ศรีสำราญ	4033	113.30	Halt	สญ.		Suphan Buri
Don Sa-nguan	ดอนสงวน	4035	118.97	Halt	ดน.	Closed	Suphan Buri
Don Thong	ดอนทอง	4036	122.31	Halt	ดถ.		Suphan Buri
Nong Phak Chi	หนองผักชี	4037	125.50	Halt	ผช.	Closed	Suphan Buri
Ban Makham Lom	บ้านมะขามล้ม	4039	131.35	Halt	มข.	Closed	Suphan Buri
Sakae Yang Mu	สะแกย่างหมู	4040	135.35	Halt	ส ู.	Closed	Suphan Buri
Suphan Buri	สุพรรณบุรี	4042	141.60	2	สพ.	Only operating station	Suphan Buri
Ma Lai Maen	มาลัยแมน		142.66	Halt		(not official terminus but trains terminate here)	Suphan Buri

== Gallery ==
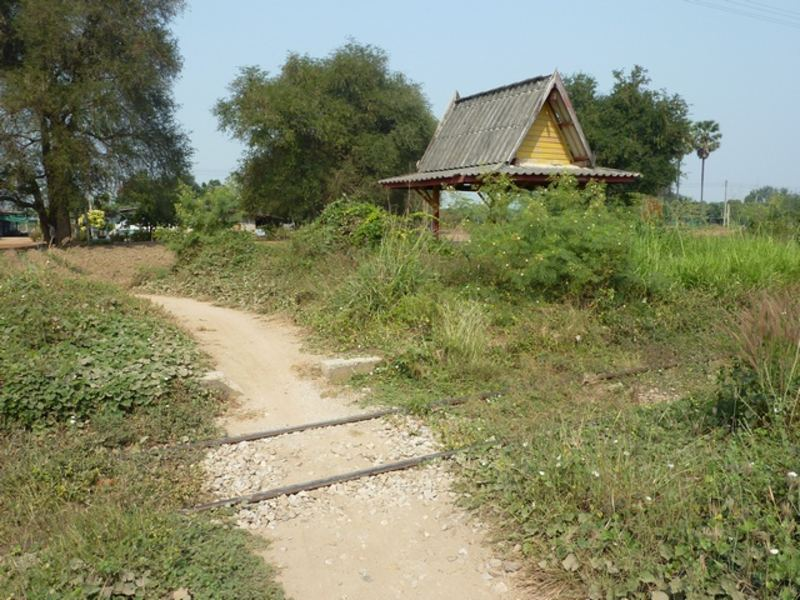
Yang Prasat Railway Halt

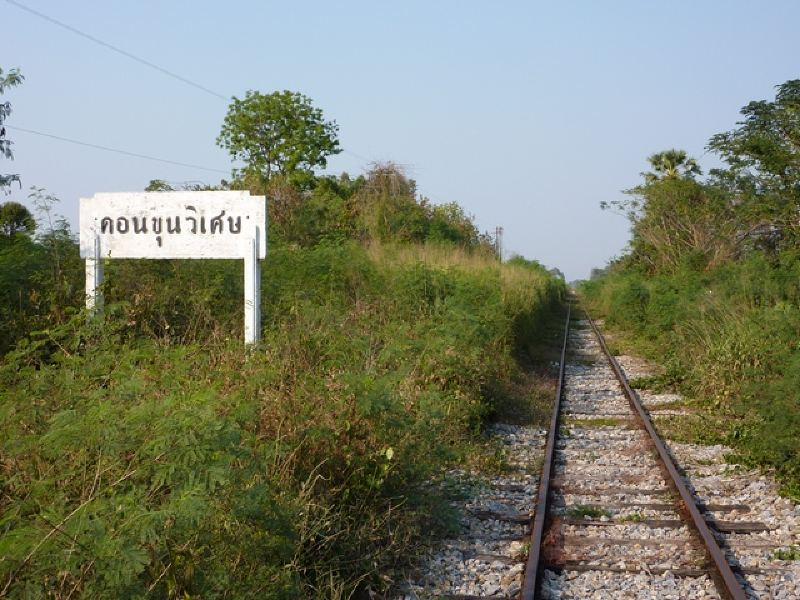
Don Khun Wiset Railway Halt

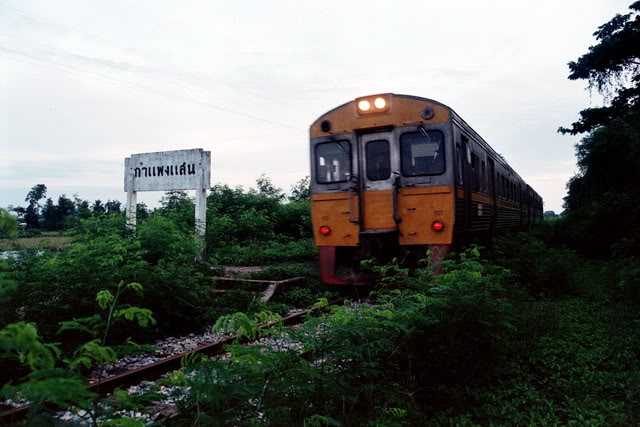
Kamphaeng Saen Railway Halt

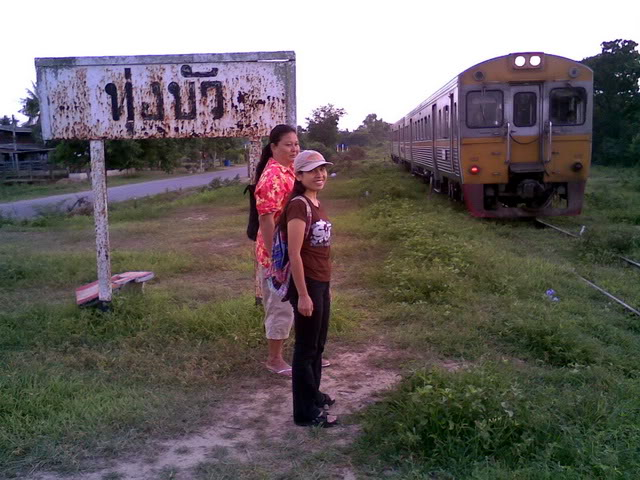
Thung Bua Railway Halt

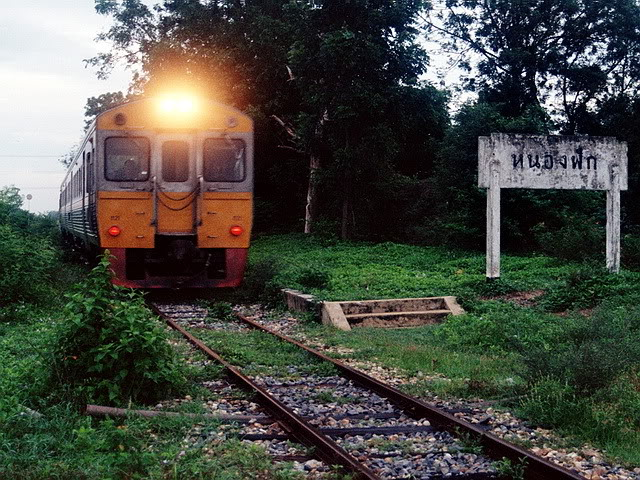
Nong Fak Railway Halt
