= Nakhon Si Thammarat railway station =

Railway station in Thailand

Coordinates: 8.4397°N 99.9597°E

Nakhon Si Thammarat นครศรีธรรมราช
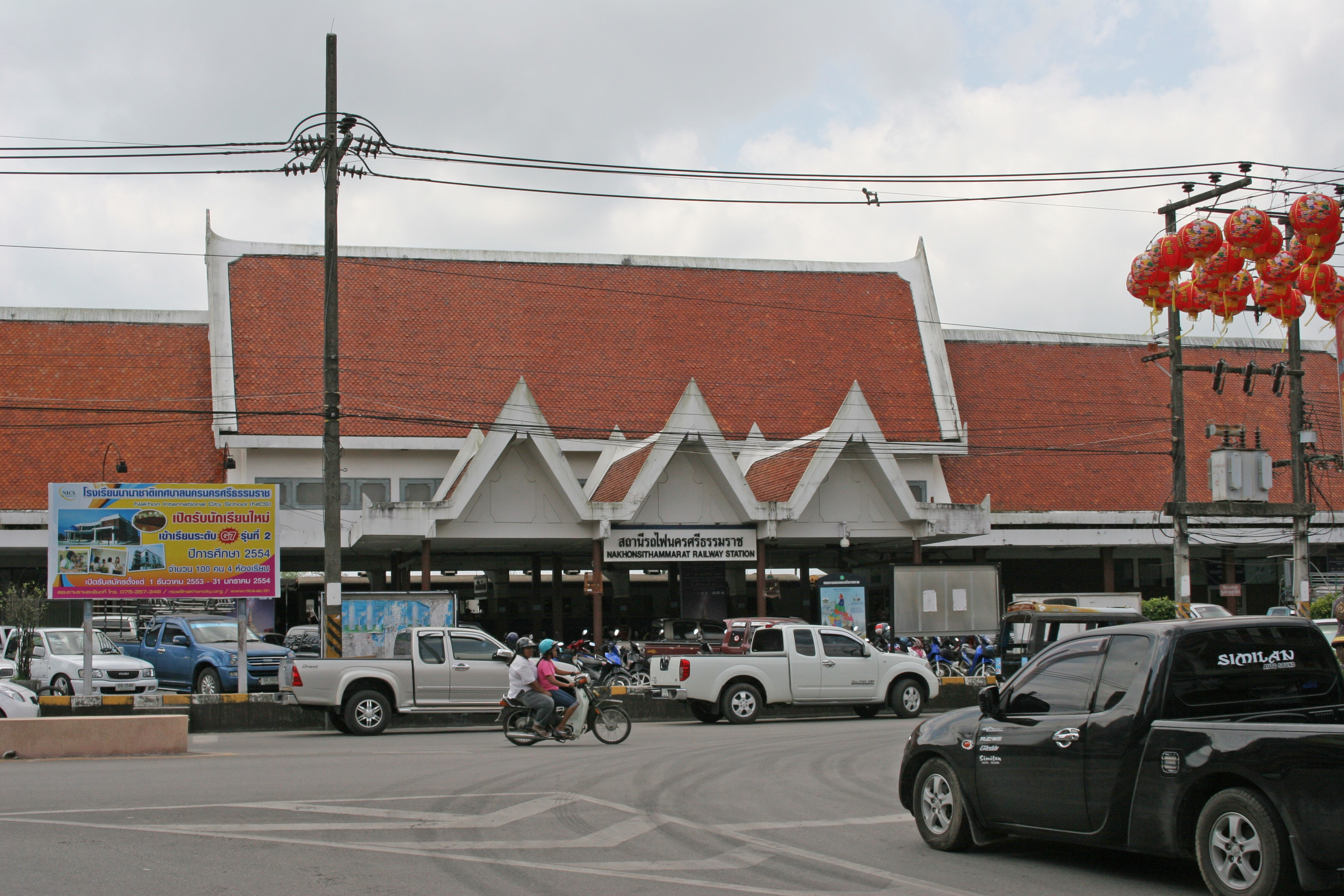
- Nakhon Si Thammarat Railway Station in 2013

General information
- Location: Yommarat Road, Tha Wang Subdistrict, Mueang Nakhon Si Thammarat district Nakhon Si Thammarat province Thailand
- Operator: State Railway of Thailand
- Manager: Ministry of Transport
- Line: Nakhon Si Thammarat Branch
- Platforms: 2
- Tracks: 5

Construction
- Structure type: At-grade

Other information
- Station code: ธำ.
- Classification: Class 1

History
- Opened: 1 October 1914

Services
Preceding station	State Railway of Thailand	Following station
Mamuang Song Ton Halt towards Khao Chum Thong Junction	Southern Line Nakhon Si Thammarat Branch	Terminus
Location

Nakhon Si Thammarat railway station is a railway station in Tha Wang Subdistrict, Mueang Nakhon Si Thammarat district, Nakhon Si Thammarat province. It is a class 1 railway station 816.025 km (507.1 mi) from Bangkok. This station opened in October 1914 as part of the Southern Line section Khao Chum Thong Junction–Nakhon Si Thammarat.

== Train services ==
- Express train No. 85 / 86 Bangkok–Nakhon Si Thammarat–Bangkok
- Rapid train No. 173 / 174 Bangkok–Nakhon Si Thammarat–Bangkok
- Local train No. 451/452 Nakhon Si Thammarat–Sungai Kolok–Nakhon Si Thammarat
- Local train No. 455/456 Nakhon Si Thammarat–Yala–Nakhon Si Thammarat
- Local train No. 457/458 Nakhon Si Thammarat–Phatthalung–Nakhon Si Thammarat
