= Ban Thung Pho Junction railway station =

Railway station in Thailand

Coordinates: 9.1212°N 99.2017°E

Ban Thung Pho Junction ชุมทางบ้านทุ่งโพธิ์
- Station building in 2026

General information
- Location: Phunphin Subdistrict, Phunphin District; Surat Thani Province; Thailand
- Operator: State Railway of Thailand
- Manager: Ministry of Transport
- Lines: Su-ngai Kolok Main Line; Khiri Rat Nikhom Branch
- Platforms: 2
- Tracks: 5

Construction
- Structure type: At-grade

Other information
- Station code: ทโ.
- Classification: Class 2

History
- Opened: July 1916

Services
| Preceding station | State Railway of Thailand | Following station |
|---|---|---|
| Maluan towards Hua Lamphong or Krung Thep Aphiwat | Southern Line | Surat Thani towards Su-ngai Kolok |
| Ban Don Rak Halt towards Khiri Rat Nikhom | Southern Line Khiri Rat Nikhom Branch | Terminus |
Location

Ban Thung Pho Junction railway station is a railway station located in Phunphin Subdistrict, Phunphin District, Surat Thani. Ban Thung Pho Junction is a class 2 railway station, located 631.0 km from Thon Buri railway station. Ban Thung Pho Junction acts as the railway junction between the Southern Line mainline and the Khiri Rat Nikhom Branch. This is also the location of a container yard for freight trains.

The station opened in July 1916 as a halt station, as part of the Chumphon–Ban Na section. It was upgraded to a junction station when the section to Khiri Rat Nikhom opened in April 1956.

== Train services ==
- Local 445/446 Chumphon–Hat Yai Junction–Chumphon
- Local 489/490 Surat Thani–Khiri Rat Nikhom–Surat Thani

== Gallery ==
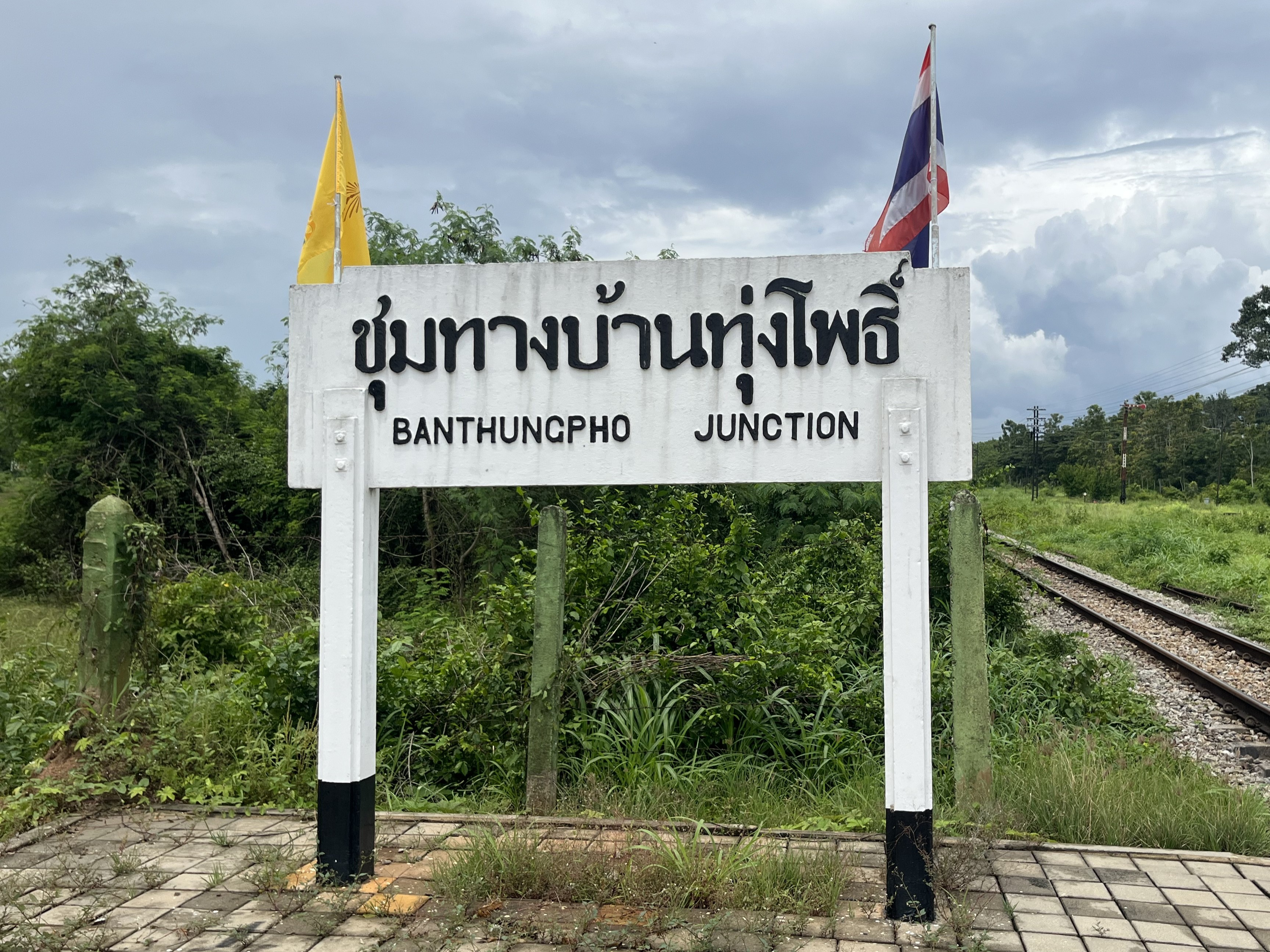
Station signage

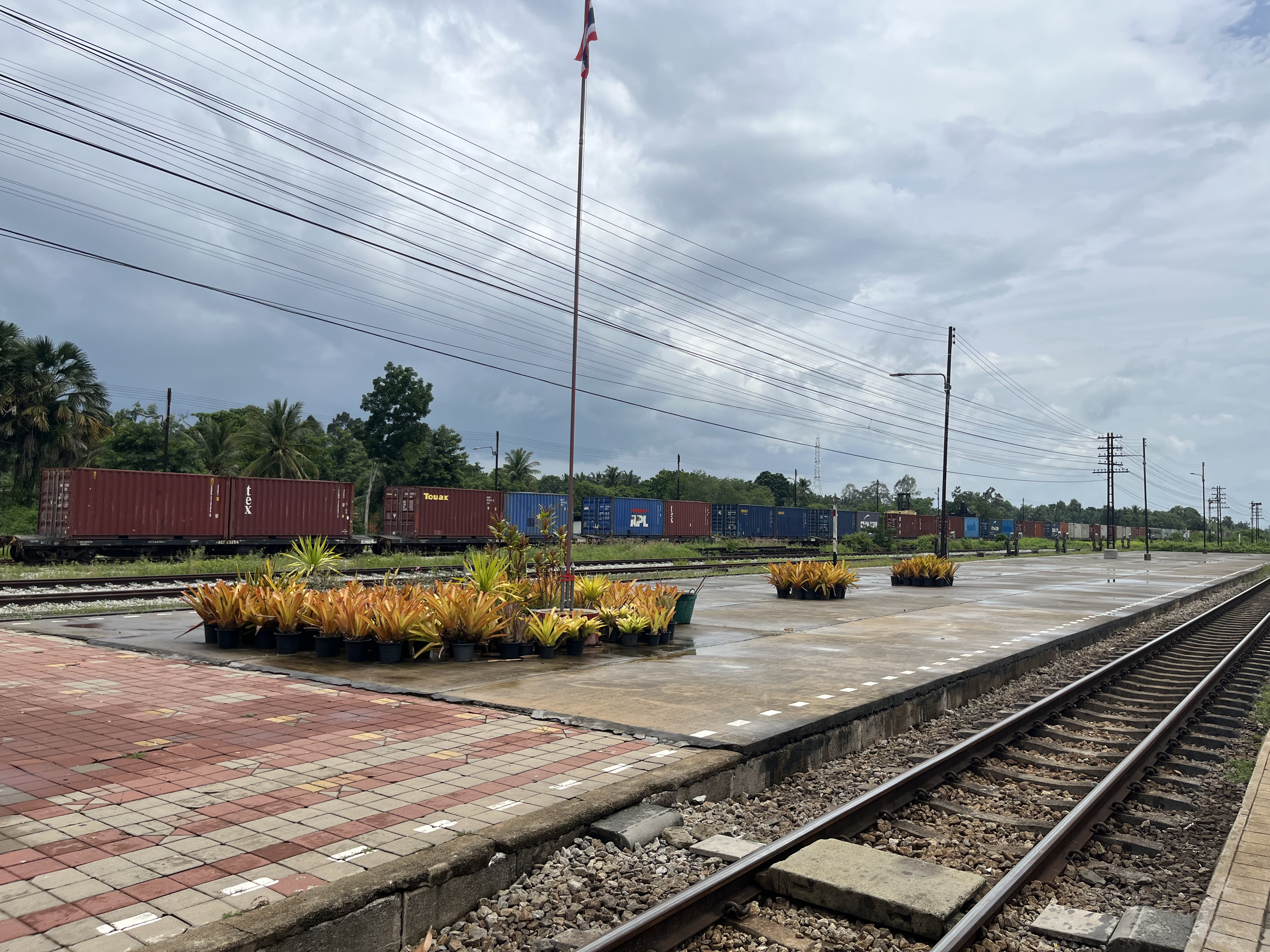
Station yard

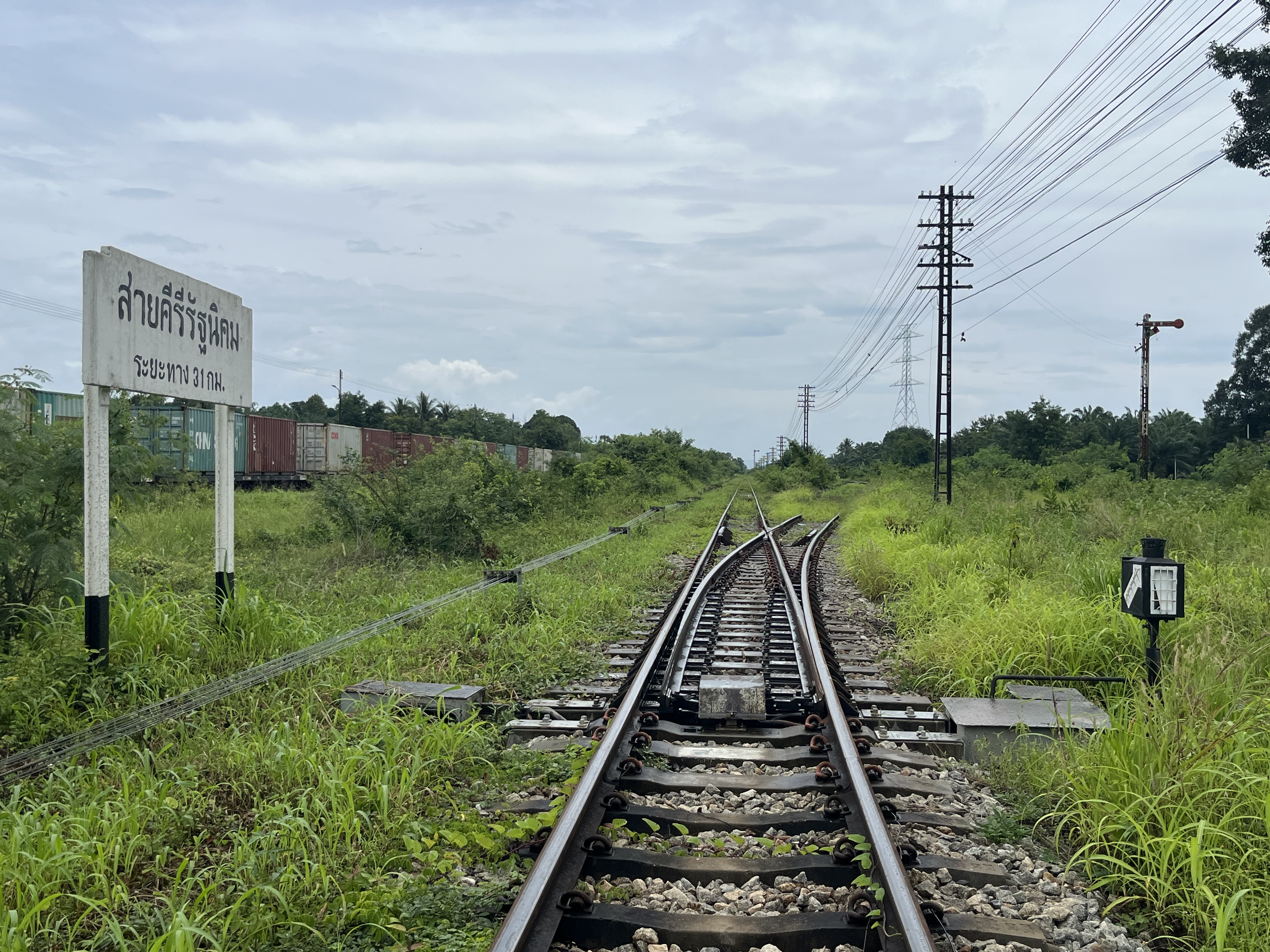
Starting point of Khiri Rat Nikhom Branchline

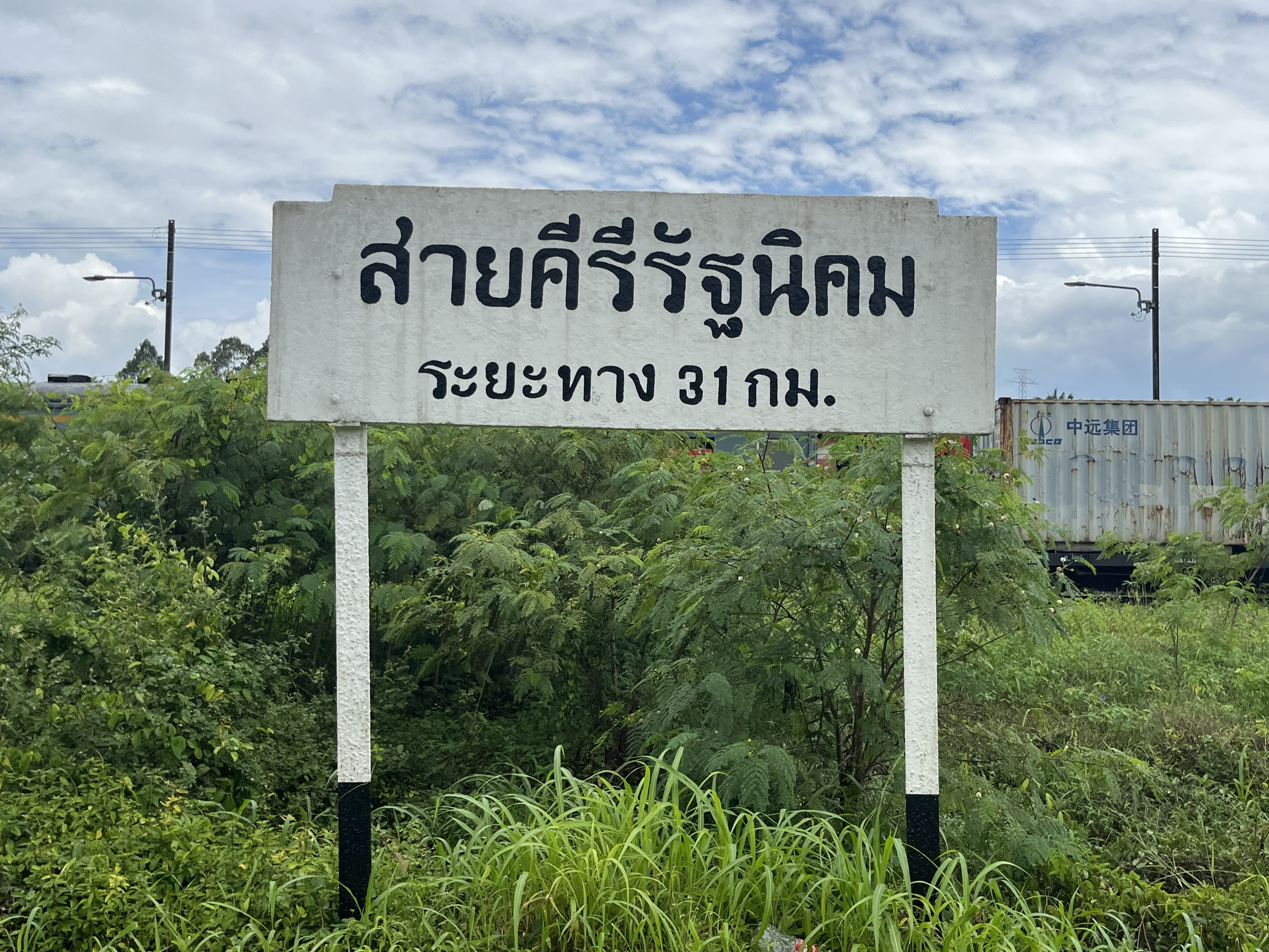
Khiri Rat Nikhom Branchline sign.

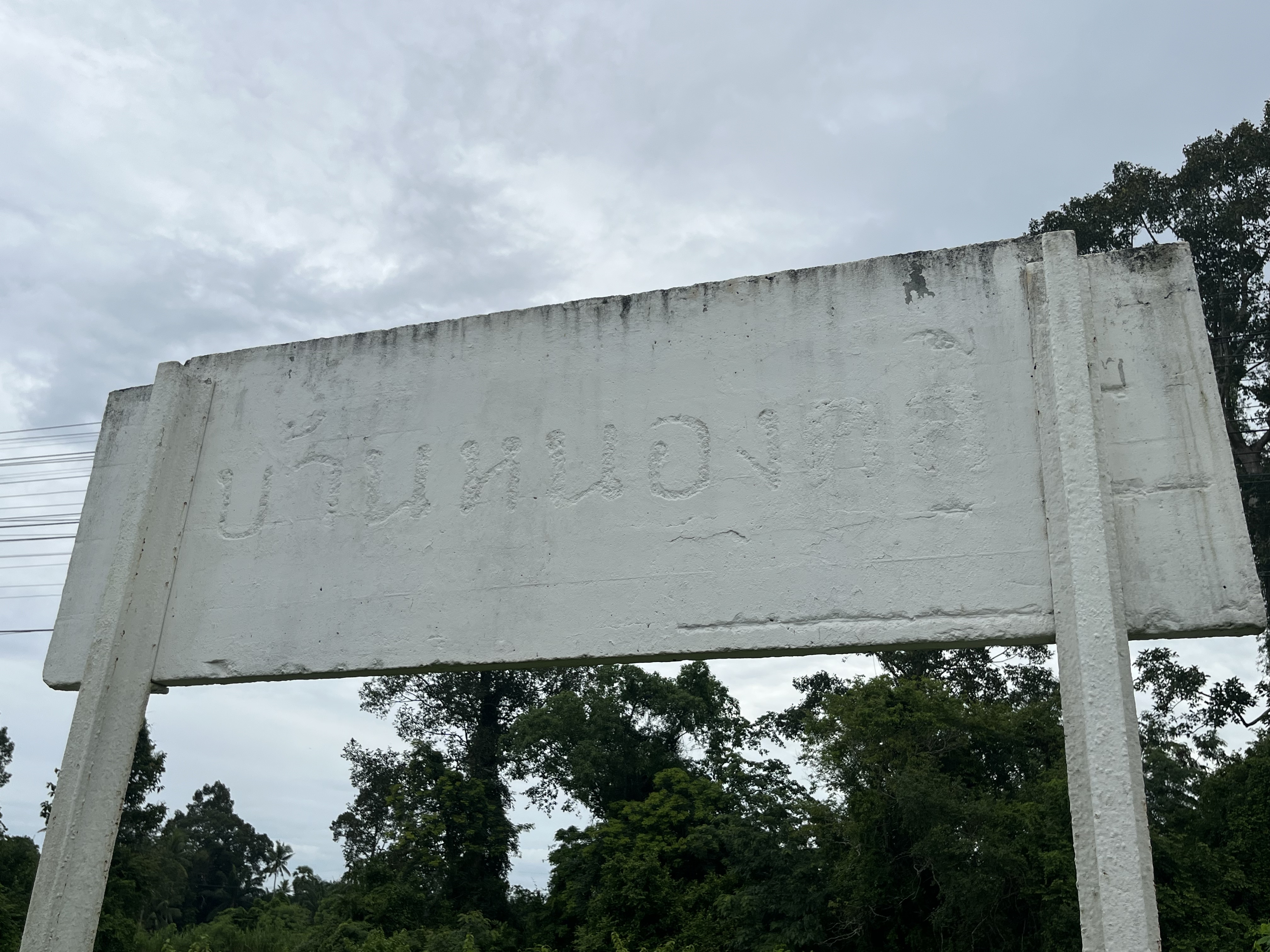
Former Ban Nong Khli halt signage. Seen behind the Khiri Rat Nikhom Branchline sign.

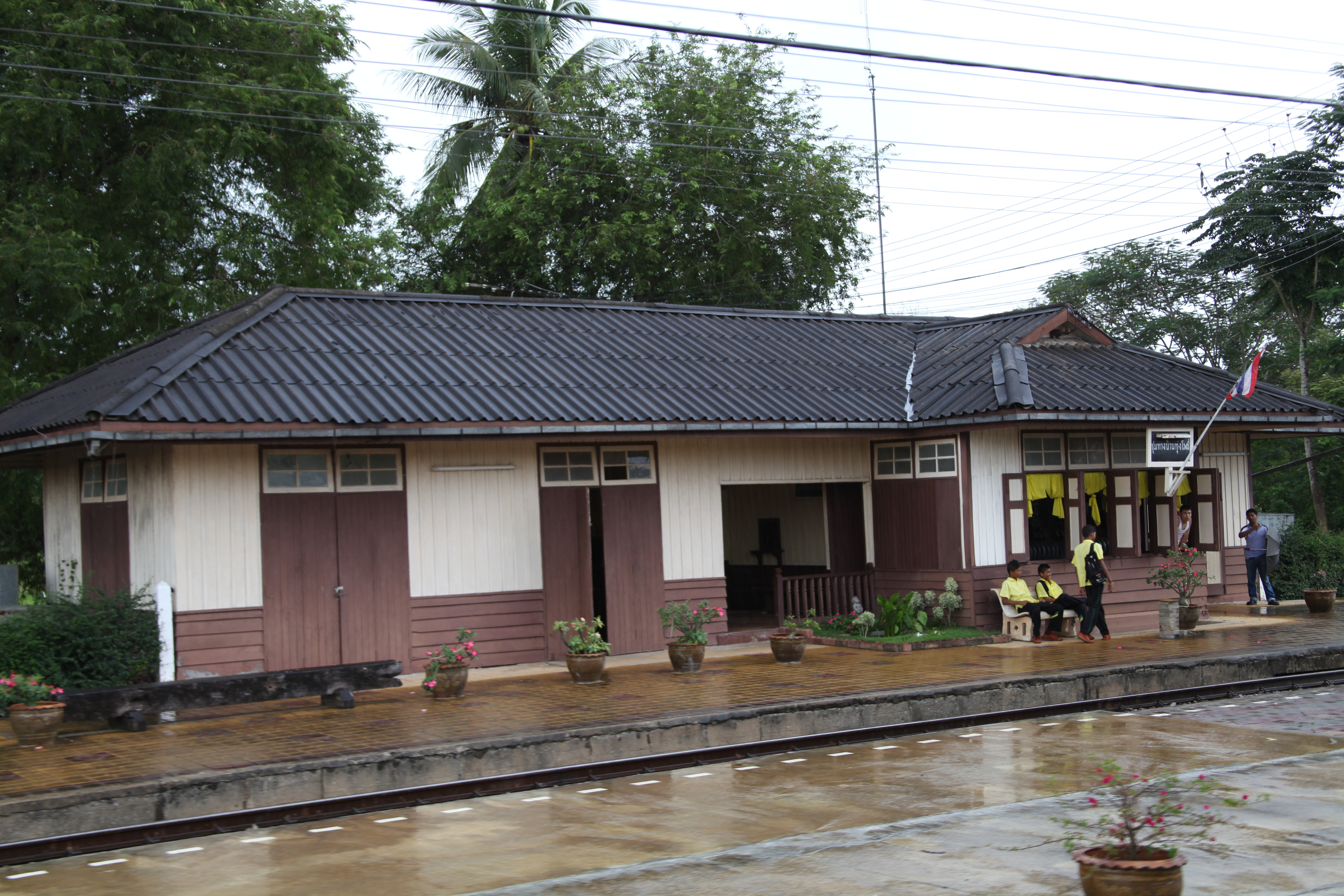
Station building
