= Yang Prasat railway halt =

Former railway station in Thailand

Yang Prasat ยางประสาท
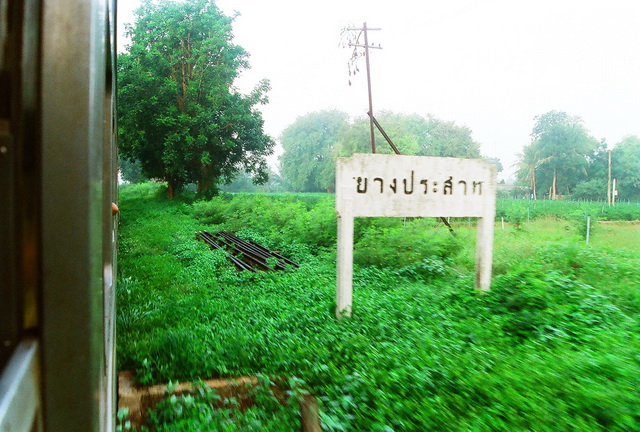

General information
- Location: Tambon Tha Pha, Amphoe Ban Pong, Ratchaburi Province; Thailand
- Coordinates: 13.8715°N 99.9127°E
- Owner: State Railway of Thailand
- Line: Suphanburi Line
- Platforms: 1 (unused)
- Tracks: 1

Construction
- Structure type: At grade

Other information
- Status: Abandoned, station sign remains

History
- Closed: January 1, 1977

Former services
Preceding station	State Railway of Thailand	Following station
Nong Pladuk Junction Terminus	Suphan Buri Branch	Don Khun Wiset Halt towards Suphan Buri
Location

Yang Prasat Halt (Thai: ที่หยุดรถยางประสาท) is a defunct railway station on the Suphanburi Line, located in Amphoe Ban Pong, Ratchaburi Province, Thailand. The station is on the west side of the track, together with Don Khun Wiset. The platform is 200 metres in length and has only one track.

Yang Prasat was changed from a railway station to a halt on January 1, 1977. Although the station ruins remain, no trains stop here.
