= Nam Tok Sai Yok Noi railway halt =

Railway station in Thailand

Nam Tok Sai Yok Noi น้ำตกไทรโยคน้อย
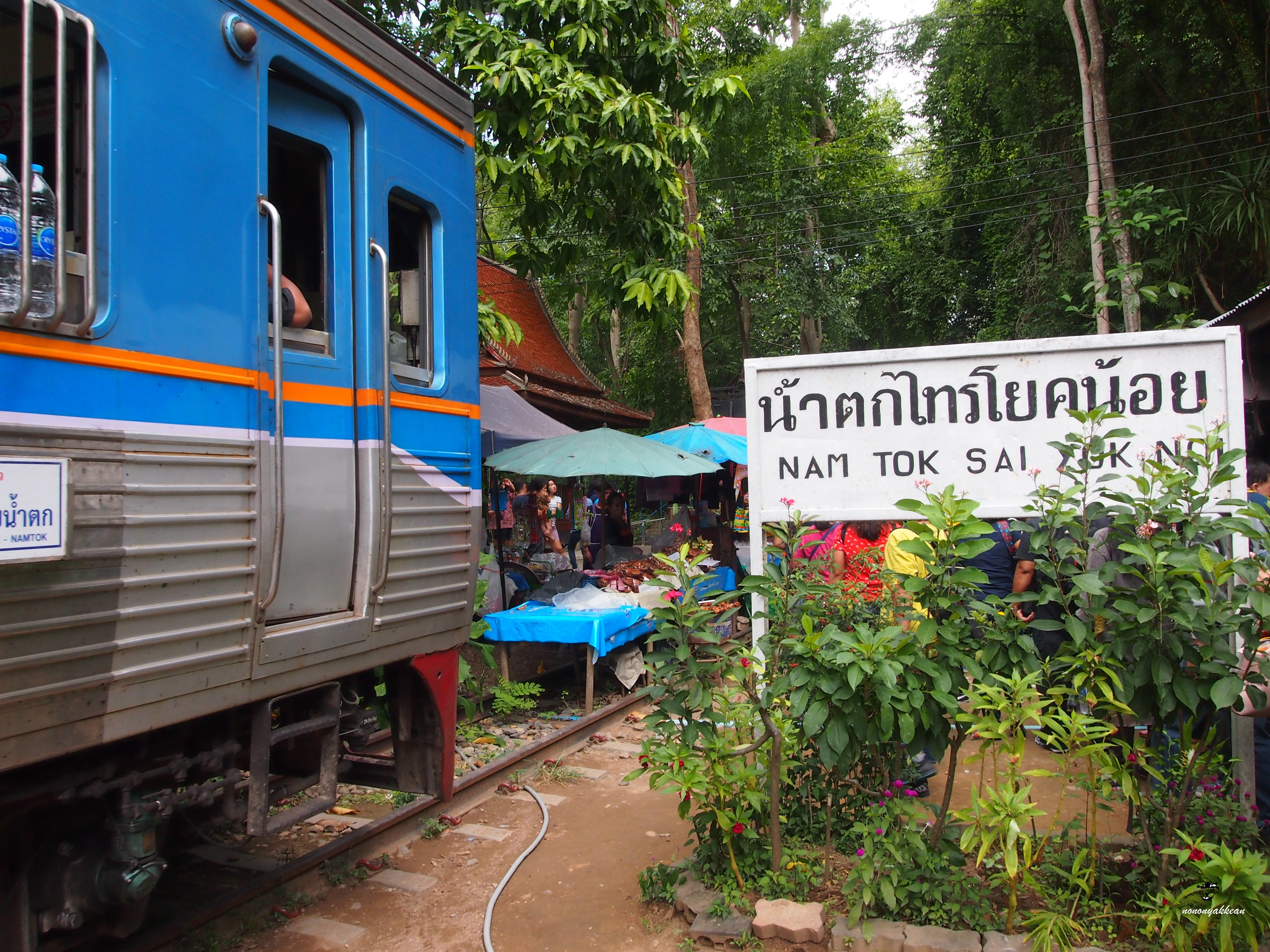

General information
- Location: Ban Tha Sao, Moo 3, Tha Sao Subdistrict, Sai Yok District; Kanchanaburi Province; Thailand
- Coordinates: 14.2375°N 99.0589°E
- Operator: State Railway of Thailand
- Manager: Ministry of Transport
- Platforms: 1
- Tracks: 1

Construction
- Structure type: At-grade

Other information
- Status: Excursion Train use only
- Classification: Halt

History
- Opened: 2002

Services
Preceding station	State Railway of Thailand	Following station
Nam Tok towards Nong Pladuk Junction	Southern Line Burma Railway	Terminus
Location

Nam Tok Sai Yok Noi railway halt is a railway halt located in a small town of Nam Tok Sai Yok Noi in Sai Yok District, Kanchanaburi Province. The station is built to promote tourism only where the nearest popular destination is the Sai Yok Noi Waterfall. Most trains terminate at Nam Tok railway station located 1.4 km away from the station.

As Sai Yok Noi is a single-platform terminus with no run-round loop, the line is only used by diesel multiple units.

== History ==
Originally, the line continued to Thanbyuzayat in Myanmar which was built by the prisoners of war during World War II. After the war, most of the railway was dismantled, leaving Nam Tok at the terminus. In 2002, the section between Nam Tok and Nam Tok Sai Yok Noi was reopened for easier access to the nearby Sai Yok waterfall.

According to the adjacent station signs at Nam Tok station, this halt is also referred to as "สุดปลายทาง" (End of the Line) or simply "Namtok" (Waterfall).

== Services ==
The only services to use the extension are trains 909/910 which are an excursion to the waterfall from Bangkok on Saturday, Sunday and Public holidays.

== Gallery ==
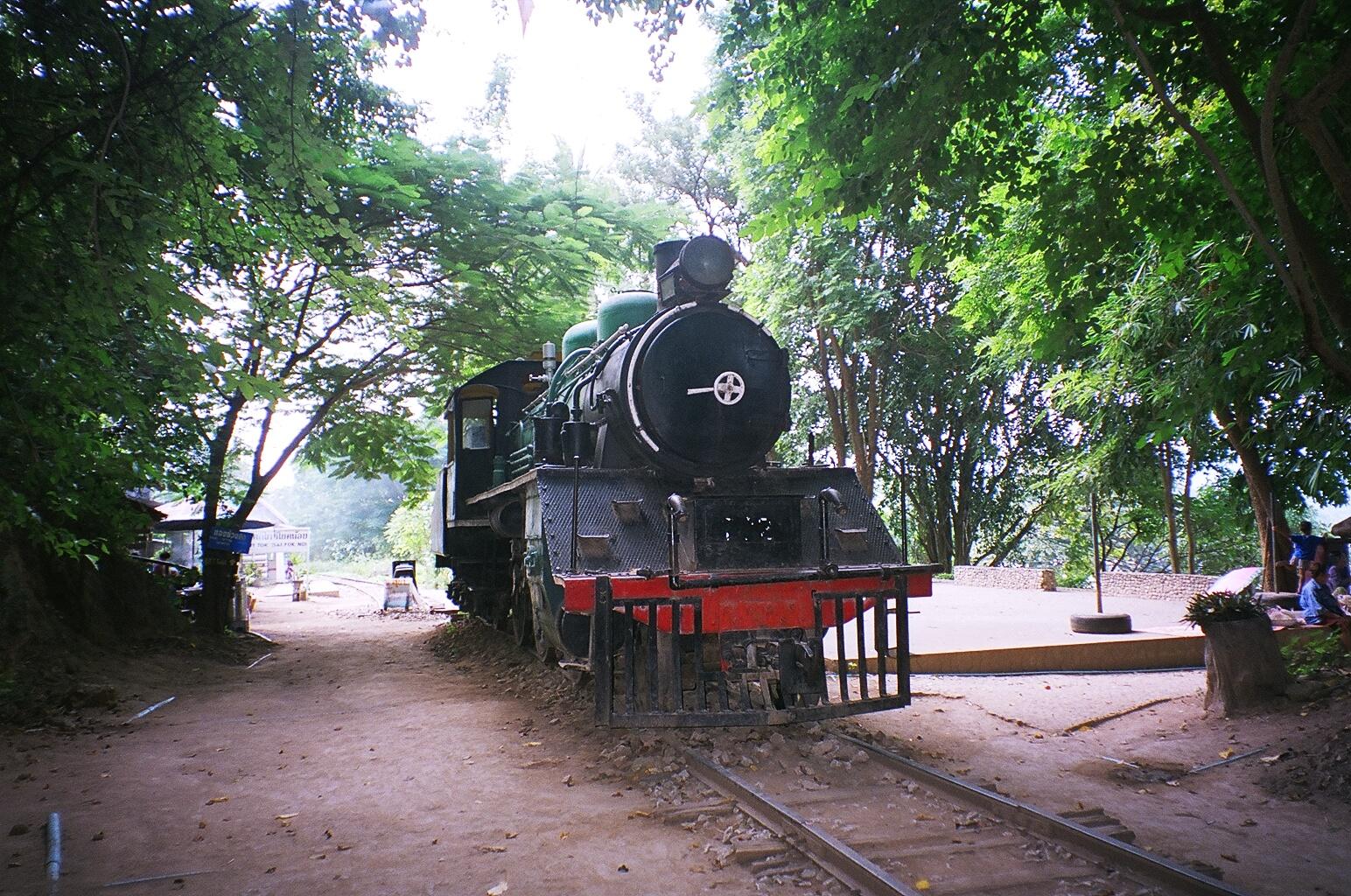
C56 4 steam locomotive built by Mitsubishi Heavy Industries located near the Sai Yok Noi Waterfall one of the locomotive used in Burma Railway

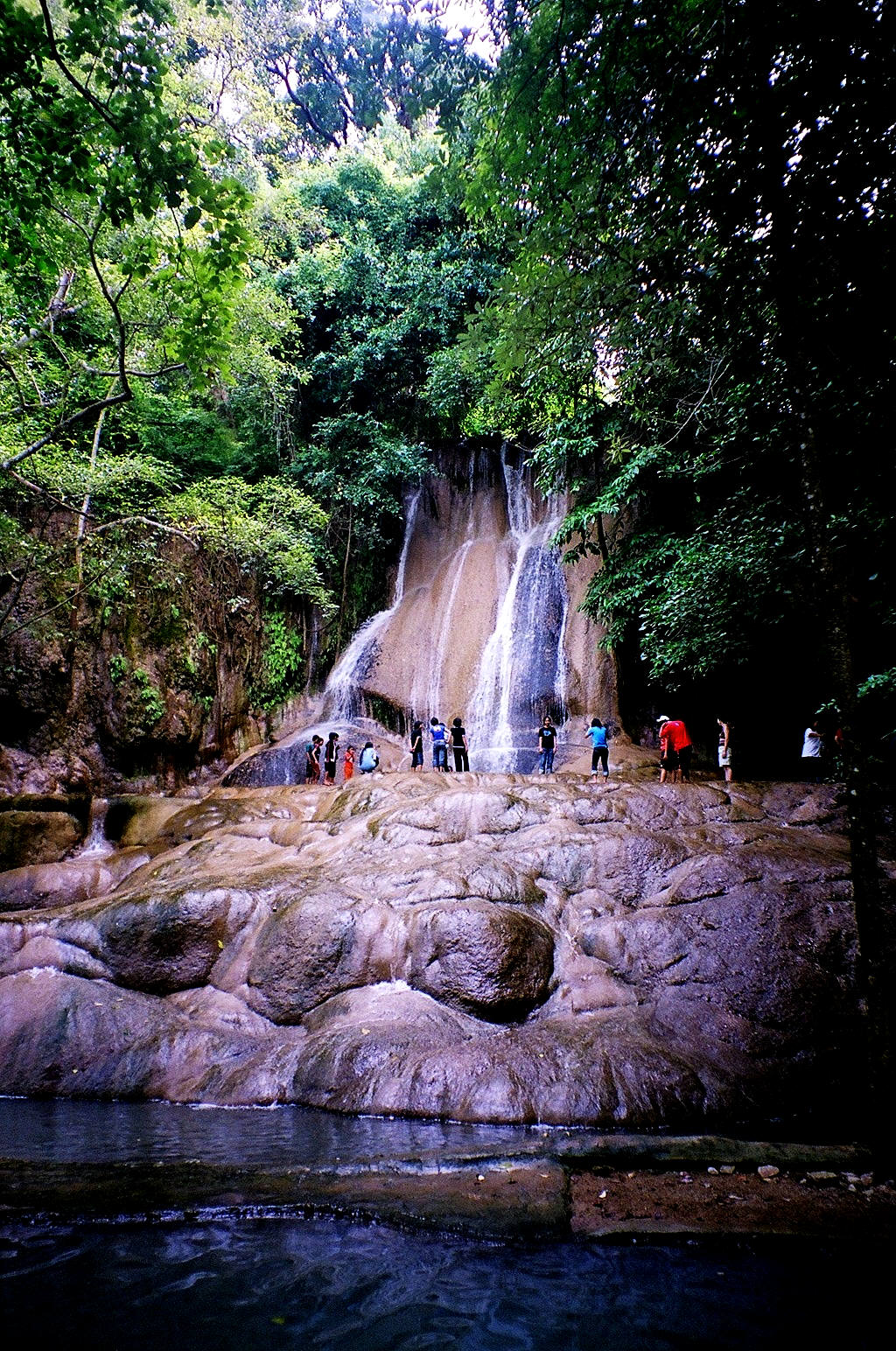
Sai Yok Noi Waterfall is a popular destination for tourism

== See also ==
- Hellfire Pass
