= Nam Tok railway station =

Railway station in Thailand

Coordinates: 14.2325°N 99.0678°E

Nam Tok น้ำตก
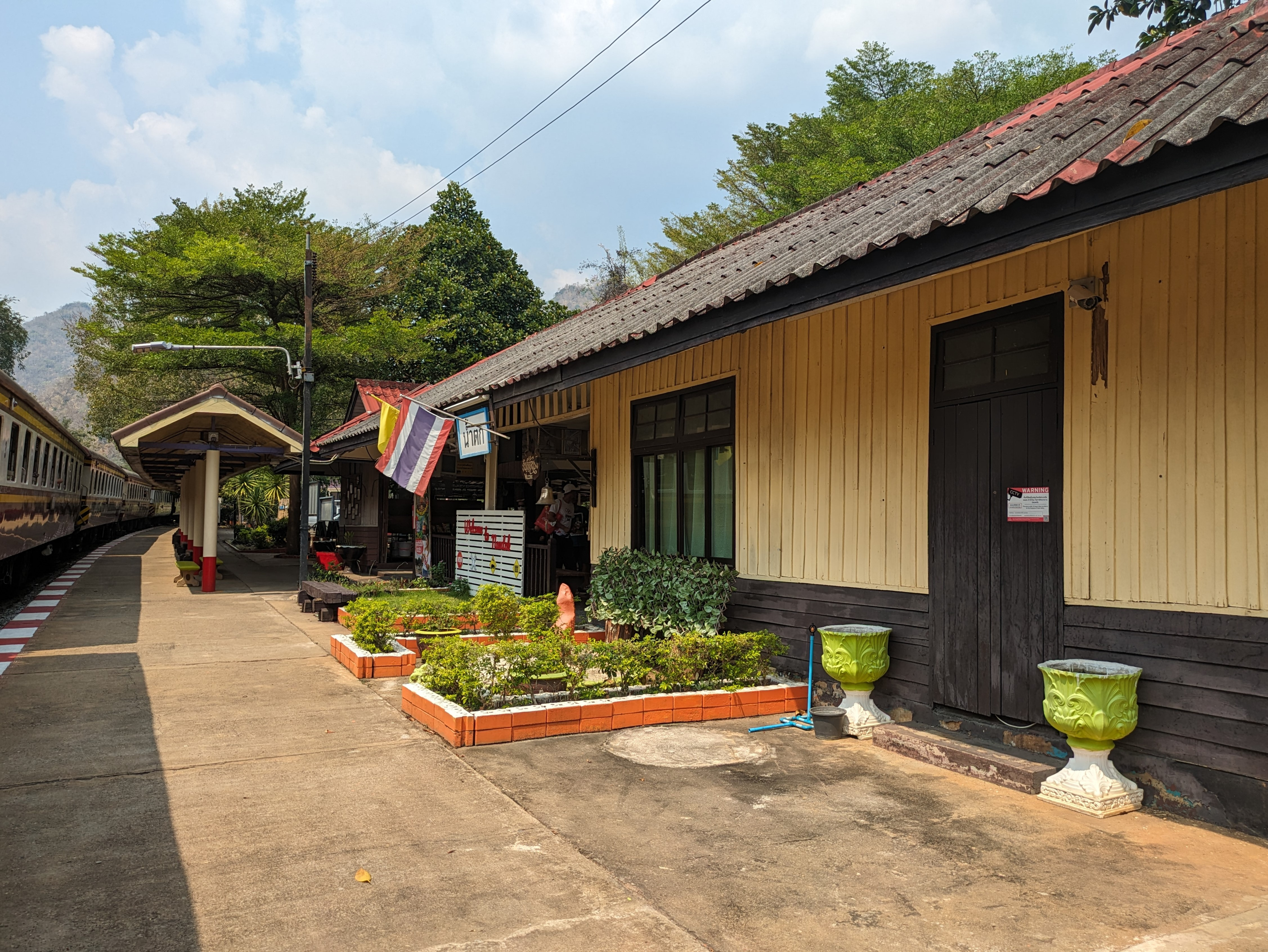

General information
- Location: Tha Sao Subdistrict, Sai Yok District; Kanchanaburi Province; Thailand
- Operator: State Railway of Thailand
- Manager: Ministry of Transport
- Distance: 194.24 km (120.7 mi) from Thon Buri
- Platforms: 1
- Tracks: 3

Construction
- Structure type: At-grade

Other information
- Status: Terminus for regular trains
- Station code: าต.
- Classification: Class 2

History
- Opened: 1 July 1958

Services
| Preceding station | State Railway of Thailand | Following station |
|---|---|---|
| Ban Pu Pong Halt towards Nong Pladuk Junction | Southern Line Burma Railway | Nam Tok Sai Yok Noi Halt Terminus |
Location

Nam Tok railway station is a railway station located in Tha Sao Subdistrict, Sai Yok District, Kanchanaburi. The station is a class 2 railway station, located 194.24 km (120.7 mi) from Thon Buri railway station. Nam Tok is the current terminus for daily trains from Bangkok on the Death Railway line. However, an excursion train from Bangkok during the weekends continues to Nam Tok Sai Yok Noi Halt, a few kilometres from the station.

The station reopened in July 1958 from Wang Pho railway station, as part of State Railway of Thailand's project in rebuilding the railway after the Second World War. The name "Nam Tok" (Thai for waterfall) refers to the nearby Sai Yok Noi waterfall. It was formerly named "Tha Sao" like the village, but later changed to "Nam Tok" because Tha Sao was an already existing station on the Northern Line.

== Train services ==
- Ordinary 257/258 Thon Buri–Nam Tok–Thon Buri
- Ordinary 259/260 Thon Buri–Nam Tok–Thon Buri
- Local 485/486 Nong Pladuk–Nam Tok–Nong Pladuk
