= Nong Pladuk Junction railway station =

Railway station in Thailand

Coordinates: 13.8177°N 99.9109°E

Nong Pladuk Junction ชุมทางหนองปลาดุก
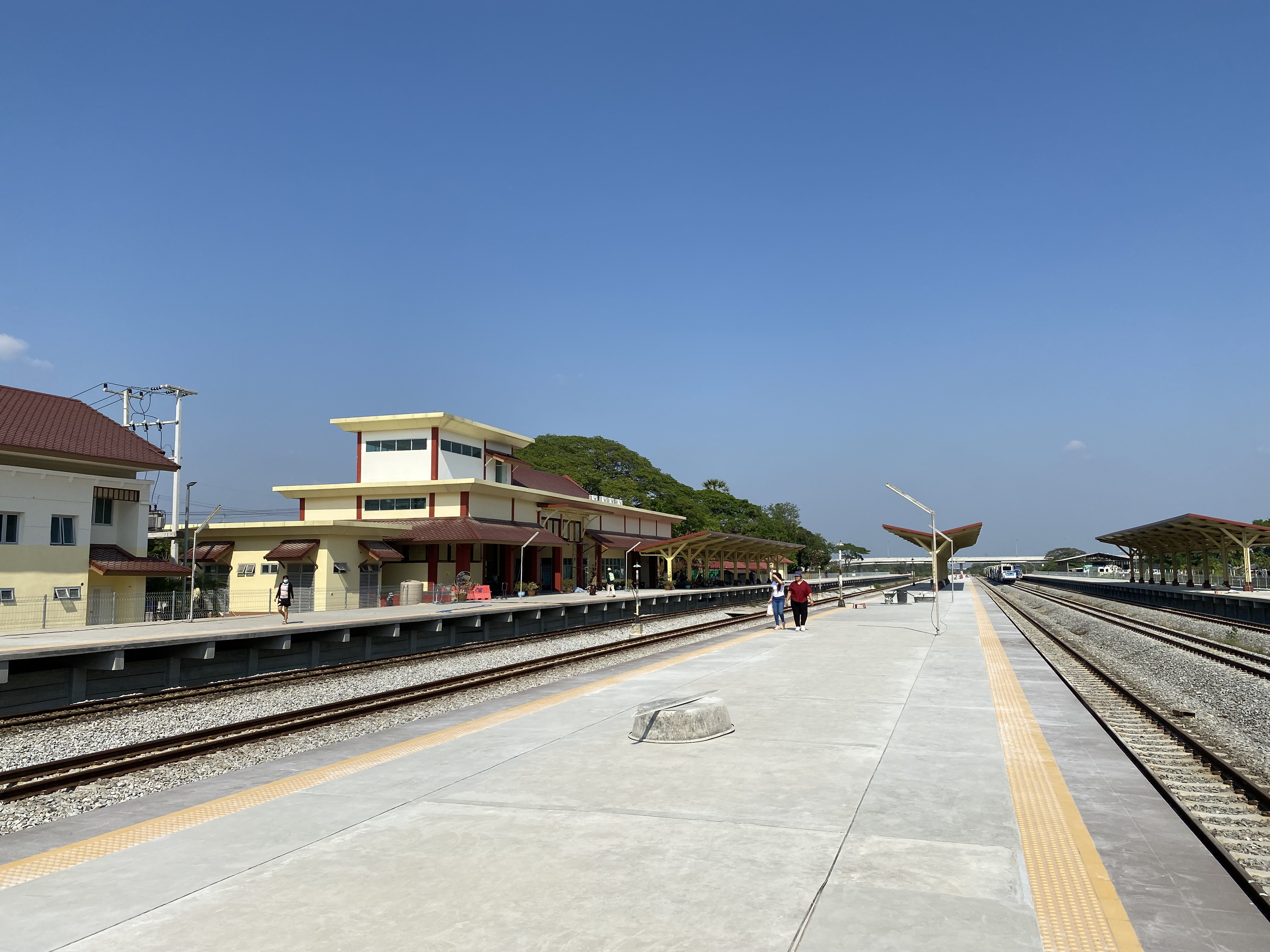
- Rebuilt station structure, view from platform 2

General information
- Location: Mu 6 (Ban Nong Pladuk), Nong Kop Sub-district, Ban Pong District, Ratchaburi; Ratchaburi Province; Thailand
- Operator: State Railway of Thailand
- Manager: Ministry of Transport
- Lines: Su-ngai Kolok Main Line; Nam Tok Line (Death Railway); Suphan Buri Line
- Platforms: 3
- Tracks: 9

Other information
- Station code: ปด.
- Classification: Class 3

History
- Opened: 19 June 1903
Services
Preceding station	State Railway of Thailand	Following station
Khlong Bang Tan towards Hua Lamphong or Krung Thep Aphiwat	Southern Line	Ban Pong towards Su-ngai Kolok
through to Bangkok via the Southern Line	Southern Line Burma Railway	Thanon Songpol Halt towards Nam Tok Sai Yok Noi Halt
through to Bangkok via the Southern Line	Southern Line Suphan Buri Line	Thung Bua Halt towards Suphan Buri or Ma Lai Maen Halt
Former services
Preceding station	State Railway of Thailand	Following station
Terminus	Suphan Buri Branch	Yang Prasat Halt towards Suphan Buri
Location

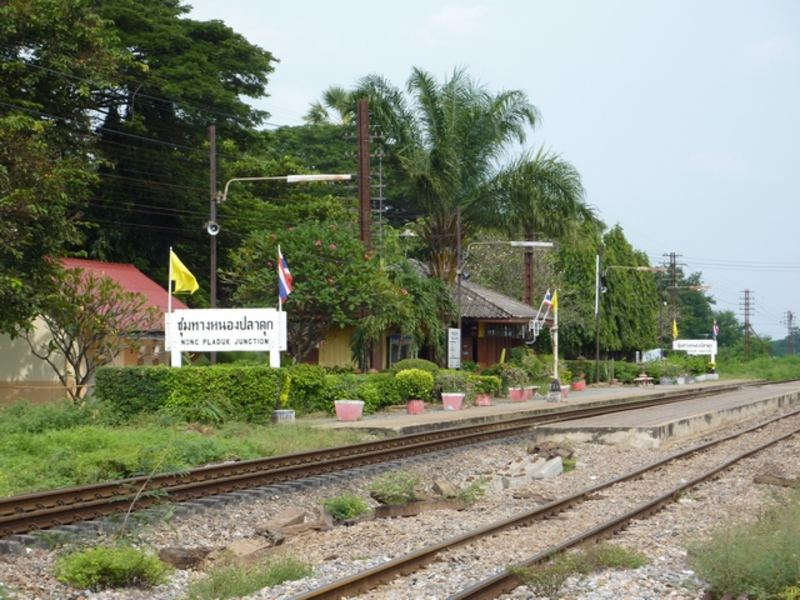
Former station structure

Nong Pladuk Junction railway station is a railway station in Nong Kop Sub-district, Ban Pong District, Ratchaburi. It is a class 3 railway station and is 64 km (39.8 mi) from Thon Buri railway station. It serves as the junction for two minor branch lines, the Nam Tok Line (Death Railway) and Suphan Buri Line.

== History ==
Nong Pladuk Junction railway station was opened on June 19, 1903, as part of the first phase of the Southern Line construction between Thon Buri and Phetchaburi.

=== Burma Railway ===
During the Second World War, Nong Pladuk Junction became the start of the Death Railway, which ended in Thanbyuzayat in Burma. Construction of the railway was coordinated by the Imperial Japanese Army, who was permitted to build due to an armistice signed with Thailand. Camp Nong Pladuk was constructed near the junction station to serve as a transit camp carrying prisoners of war, especially from occupied British Malaya and Singapore. On 16 September 1942, construction started at both ends of the planned railway line. At the end of the war, the railway was confiscated by the British, who later sold it to the State Railway of Thailand. The section from Nong Pladuk to Kanchanaburi reopened on 24 June 1949 and later to Nam Tok in 1958.

On 16 June 1963, a railway line from Nong Pladuk was opened to Suphan Buri by Field Marshal Sarit Thanarat, then prime minister.

In 2024, the station was rebuilt as part of the double-track section from Nakhon Pathom - Chumphon. The station now featured a new station building, elevated platforms, and a larger station yard. The branch lines to Nam Tok and Suphan Buri (Platform 1) are now completely separated from the main line (Platform 2) as it had been diverted by the new station layout.
