= Suphan Buri railway station =

Railway station in Suphan Buri Province, Thailand

Coordinates: 14°27′54″N 100°05′40″E

Suphan Buri สุพรรณบุรี
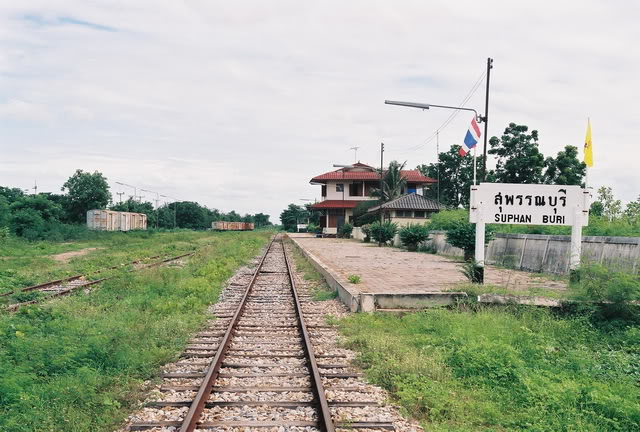

General information
- Location: Tambon Rua Yai, Mueang Suphan Buri; Suphan Buri Province; Thailand
- Operator: State Railway of Thailand
- Platforms: 1
- Tracks: 3

Construction
- Structure type: At grade
- Parking: Yes

Other information
- Status: Train terminus
- Station code: สพ.

Services
Preceding station	State Railway of Thailand	Following station
Don Thong towards Nong Pladuk Junction	Southern Line Suphan Buri Line	Ma Lai Maen Halt Terminus
Location

Suphan Buri railway station is a railway station on the Suphan Buri Line in Tambon Rua Yai, Mueang Suphan Buri District, Suphan Buri Province, Thailand. It is the Suphan Buri provincial station and the only one operating on the line. Two trains stop at it, but passenger count is low due to its distance from Suphan Buri's city centre.

== Services ==
- Commuter Train No. 355 Bangkok–Suphan Buri
- Commuter Train No. 356 Suphan Buri–Bangkok
