= Southern Line (Thailand) =

Railway line in Thailand

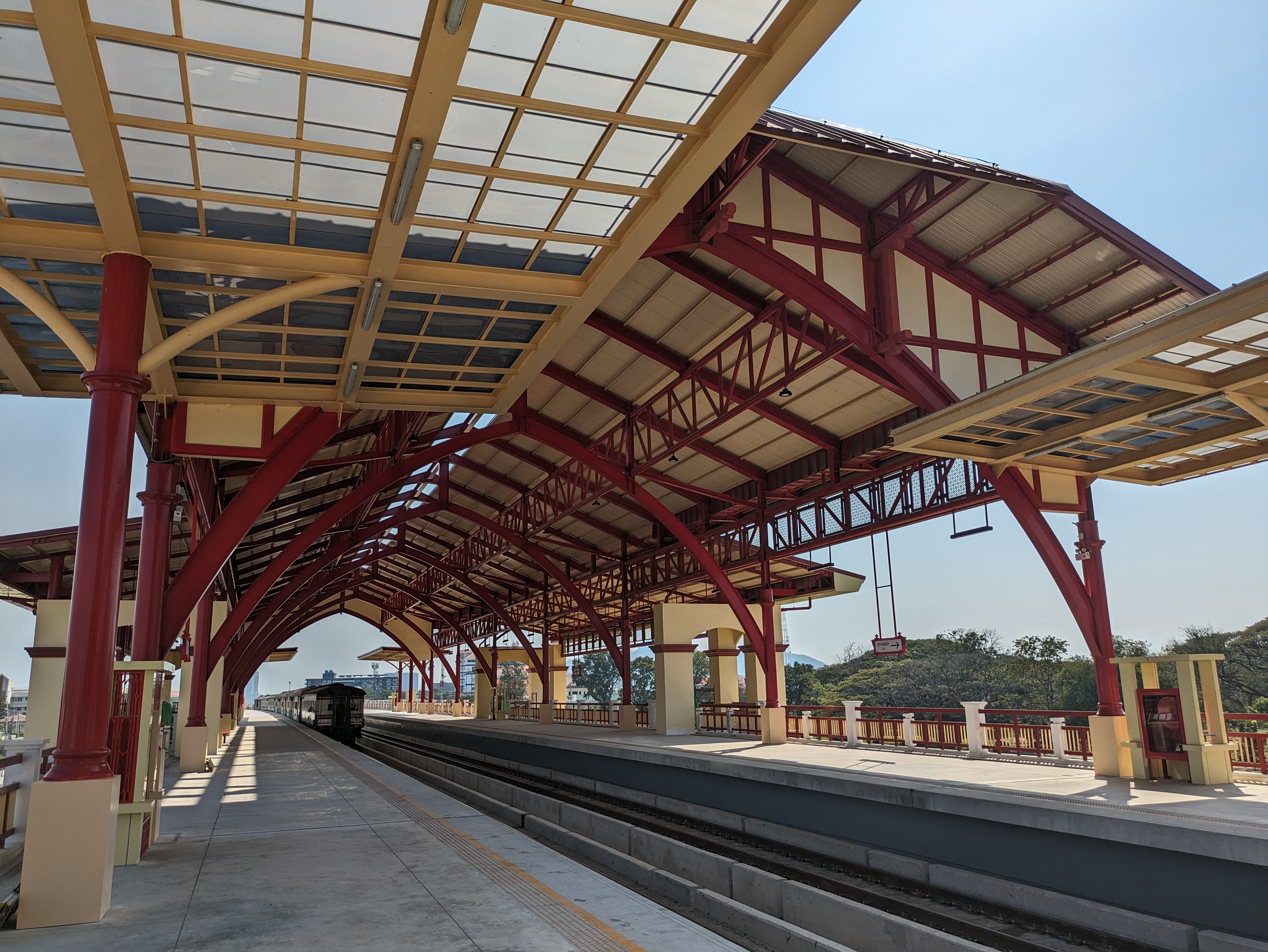
- Hua Hin railway station, one of the most important stations on the Southern Line

Overview
- Status: Operational
- Owner: Government of Thailand
- Locale: Central, Western and Southern Thailand
- Termini: Bangkok (Hua Lamphong); Krung Thep Aphiwat Central Terminal; Thon Buri; Su-ngai Kolok; Suphanburi; Nam Tok; Khiri Rat Nikhom; Kantang; Nakhon Si Thammarat; Padang Besar (Malaysia)
- Connecting lines: Su-ngai Kolok Main Line; Thon Buri Line; Suphanburi Line (part of GBCR); Burma Railway (former links to Myanmar Railways); Khiri Rat Nikhom Line; Kantang Line; Nakhon Si Thammarat Line; Padang Besar Line (links to Keretapi Tanah Melayu)

Service
- Type: Inter-city rail; Regional rail; Commuter rail; Freight rail
- Operator(s): State Railway of Thailand
- Depot(s): Bang Sue; Thon Buri; Chumphon; Thung Song; Hat Yai

History
- Commenced: 1900–1927; 99 years ago
- Opened: 19 June 1903; 122 years ago
- Completed: 1 January 1927; 99 years ago

Technical
- Line length: 1,144.29 km (711.03 mi)
- Number of tracks: 2–1
- Track gauge: 1,000 mm (3 ft 3 3/8 in) metre gauge

Southern Line (Thai: ทางรถไฟสายใต้) is a metre-gauge railway line in Thailand, operated by State Railway of Thailand (SRT), which runs through most of the provinces in the Central, Western, and Southern regions of Thailand. At 1,144.29 kilometres (711.03 mi) in length, it is Thailand's longest railway line.

== History ==
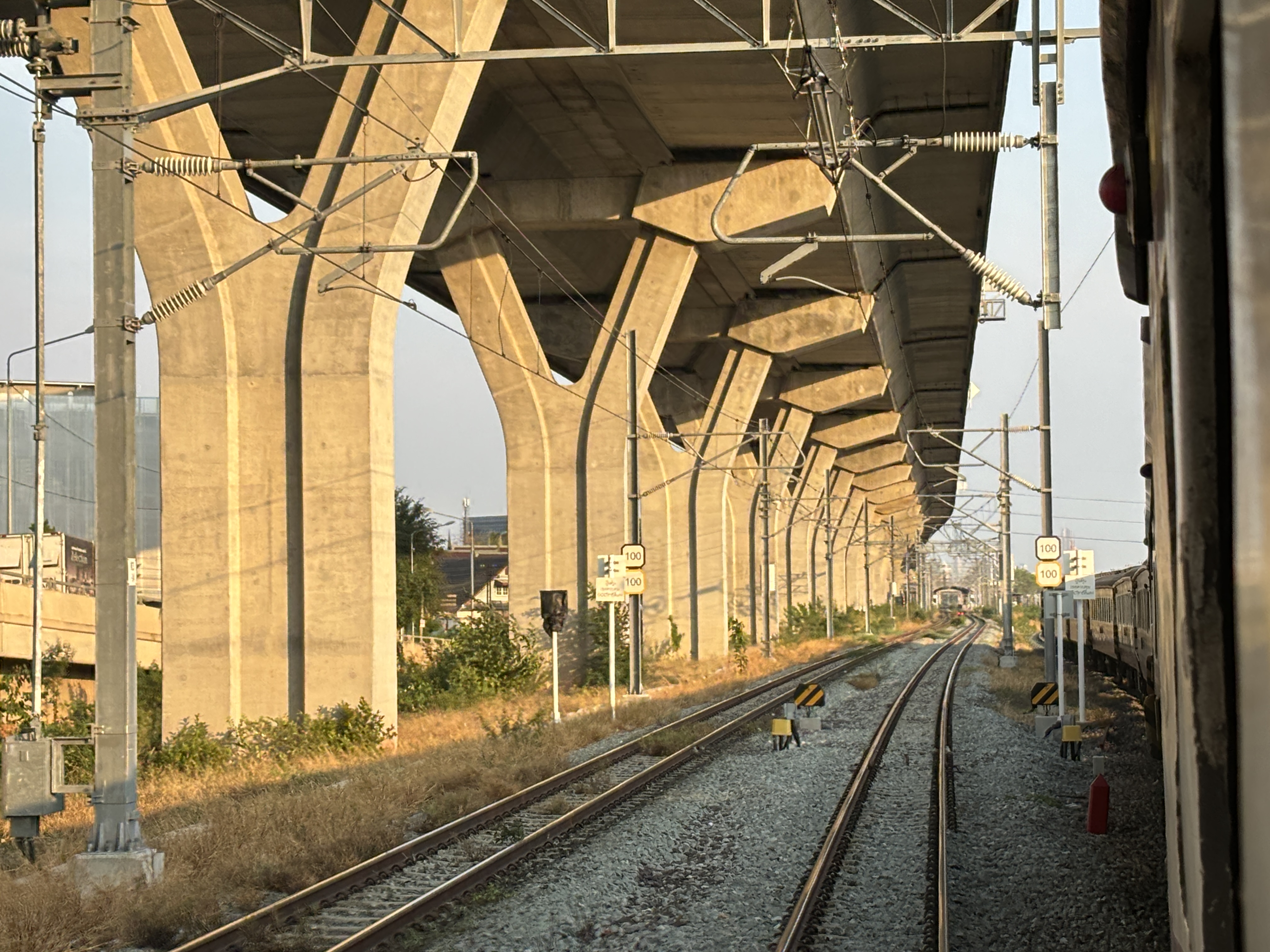
Thonburi Branch off from the Main line near Taling Chan Junction railway station (2024)

In 1894, the Danish engineer Aage Westenholz (1859–1935), uncle of the writer Karen Blixen, was given the concession to build a route from Bangkok to Phetchaburi. The project failed due to the difficulty of raising sufficient capital. As a result, the Thai state decided in 1898 to build the main rail lines and bought back the concession. Other concession requests made by railroad entrepreneurs in the Thai part of the Malay Peninsula were all rejected.

After the Thai state had repurchased the West timber concession, the Royal Railway Department (RRD) in the Ministry of Public Works planned a route, under Karl Bethge from the Krupp Company to Phetchaburi. The construction work began in April 1900.

Because of the length of the route, construction occurred simultaneously in three sections:

1. from Phetchaburi to the south
2. from the port Songkhla on the east coast
3. from Kantang port on the west coast of the Malay Peninsula.

In contrast to the rest of the Thai railway network, which was built in standard gauge, the Royal State Railways of Siam chose the metre gauge to allow for a seamless connection to the metre gauge railways of Burma and Malaya.

The Southern Railway was isolated from the rest of the network, starting from a terminus in Thonburi, on the west side of the Chao Phraya river as there was no bridge across the river. Thonburi station was accessible by ferry from the east side of the Chao Phraya river. The building was designed in the style of brick expressionism by the German architect Karl Döhring, engineer with the Royal State Railways of Siam. It is now a Medical Museum.

On 1 April 1903, traffic on the first completed section between Thonburi and Phetchaburi was operated with makeshift carriages, as delivery of a significant portion of the rail vehicles was delayed. When these had arrived, the official opening was held on 19 June 1903 by King Chulalongkorn (Rama V.)

On 1 July 1918, trains were able to operate from Thon Buri Railway station to Malaysia via Padang Besar. The initial service was two trains per week and the journey time took 60 hours.

An official opening ceremony did not take place because of World War One. Long-distance trips were interrupted for overnight stays with the Royal State Railways of Siam providing hotels at major train stations. In 1922, night traffic and sleeping cars were introduced and the travel time from Bangkok to Penang reduced to just over 30 hours.

The railway was forced to relinquish the metre gauge line, already built under its direction from Bangkok Thonburi to Phetchaburi to the Southern State Railway. This was not only technically reasonable, because it provided a uniform administration for each of the two gauges operated by the state, but also a political balancing act of Thailand, which until 1917 was neutral in the First World War. The northern RRD worked under the German director Karl Bethgen, the southern under the British Henry Gittens, whose countries of origin were now enemies of the war.

After Thailand's entry into the war on the British and French sides on July 22, 1917, the connection of the Malay and the Thai railway network received high priority. Initially, it was planned to establish the connection via the east coast of Malaysia following route. The construction progress of the track in Malaysia was slow. So the authorities decided to establish a connection with the Malay West Railway. This was put into operation in 1918. The route over the eastern border crossing Sungai Kolok could only go into operation on 1 November 1921.

Construction started in December 1922 of the Rama VI Bridge (Thai: สะพานพระราม 6) over the Chao Phraya River during the reign of Rama VI. Opened on 1 January 1927 it linked the Northern and Eastern rail lines with the Southern railway and allowed Southern Railway trains to operate into Bangkok Hua Lamphong railway station.

The original Thon Buri railway station was destroyed in the air raids in 1945. After World War II, General Philbul Songkhram had the Thon Buri Station Building rebuilt in the original style.

In 2003, the terminus of the line westward to the previous station Bangkok Noi, was relocated and the vacated railway area was utilised for the extension of Siriraj Hospital. The Bangkok Noi station reverted to the name Thon Buri railway station.

In 2015, the Siriraj Phimukhsthan Museum was opened in what was the original Thon Buri railway station.

On 15 December 2023, the double-track section opened between Ban Khu Bua and Saphli. On 13 August 2024, the double-track section opened between Nakhon Pathom and Chumphon.

=== Timeline ===
==== Opened ====
- 19 June 1903: Bangkok Noi–Phetchaburi
- 9 June 1911: Phetchaburi–Cha-am
- 25 November 1911: Cha-am–Hua Hin
- 1 January 1913: Phatthalung–U Taphao–Songkhla
- 1 April 1913: Kantang–Huai Yot
- 1 January 1914: Hua Hin–Wang Phong
- 1 January 1914: Huai Yot–Thung Song
- 1 June 1914: Wang Phong–Prachuap Khiri Khan
- 1 October 1914: Khao Chum Thong–Nakhon Si Thammarat
- 1 October 1914: Thung Song–Ron Phibun–Phatthalung
- 14 February 1915: Ban Na–Thung Song
- 15 March 1915: Ban Krut–Bang Saphan Yai
- 1 December 1915: Prachuap Khiri Khan–Ban Krut
- 17 July 1916: Chumphon–Ban Na
- 1 September 1916: Bang Saphan Yai–Chumphon
- 1 April 1917: U Taphao–Hat Yai–Khlong Sai
- 1 July 1918: Hat Yai–Padang Besar
- 1 March 1920: Balo–Tanyong Mat
- 1 November 1920: Khlong Sai–Balo
- 17 September 1921: Tanyong Mat–Su-ngai Kolok
- 1 January 1927: Hua Lamphong–Taling Chan
- 24 June 1949: Nong Pladuk–Kanchanaburi
- 1 April 1952: Kanchanaburi–Wang Pho
- 13 April 1956: Ban Thung Pho–Khiri Rat Nikhom
- 1 July 1958: Wang Pho–Nam Tok
- 16 June 1963: Nong Pladuk–Suphan Buri
- 12 May 1995: Nam Tok–Nam Tok Sai Yok Noi

==== Abolished ====
- 1 July 1978: Hat Yai–Songkhla
- 4 October 2003: Bangkok Noi–Thon Buri

== Route description ==
The Southern Line consists of the Su-ngai Kolok Main Line which stretches from Bangkok Hua Lamphong to Su-ngai Kolok District, Narathiwat Province, in the far south of Thailand, 1,140 kilometres from Bangkok. There are seven branch lines off this main line:

1. Thon Buri Line
2. Suphanburi Line which is also the part of Greater Bangkok Commuter rail
3. Burma Railway (or Nam Tok Line): from Ban Pong to Kanchanaburi Province
4. Khiri Rat Nikhom Line: from Surat Thani to Khiri Rat Nikhom
5. Kantang Line: from Thung Song District, Nakhon Si Thammarat Province to Kantang District, Trang Province
6. Nakhon Si Thammarat Line: 35.01 km line from Khao Chum Thong Junction to Nakhon Si Thammarat (km 816.02).
7. Padang Besar Line: from Hat Yai Junction Station to Padang Besar railway station where it meets the Keretapi Tanah Melayu (KTM)

It begins at Bangkok Hua Lamphong railway station and heads west towards Nakhon Pathom.

At Nong Pladuk Junction, there are two branches. The first is the Suphanburi Line which heads north towards Suphan Buri (km 157). It is part of the Greater Bangkok Commuter rail. The second is the Nam Tok Branch also known as the Burma Railway or the Kanchanaburi railway or the Death Railway which runs west towards Kanchanaburi Province (km 117.046) finishing at Nam Tok (km 194.24)

The Southern Main Line continues southbound from Nong Pladuk Junction through the provinces of Ratchaburi, Phetchaburi, Hua Hin, Prachuap Khiri Khan Province, Chumphon to Surat Thani, 678 kilometres away.

From Ban Thung Pho Junction, a station before Surat Thani, there is a westerly branch towards Khiri Rat Nikhom.

The main line continues south to Thung Song Junction (km 757.8) in Nakhon Si Thammarat Province. There a branch extends to Kantang in Trang Province.

At Khao Chum Thong Junction, another 35 km-long branch separates from the mainline heading to Nakhon Si Thammarat (km 816)

The main line continues through to Phatthalung (km 861.01) before reaching Hat Yai Junction in Songkhla Province (km 928.58). From here, the line branches to connect with the Malaysian railway at Padang Besar (km 973.84).

The main line continues to Sungai Kolok (km 1142.99) passing through Yala Province in the process.

=== Closed Lines ===
There are two lines that are defunct:

- Hat Chao Samran Railway (1921–23): South of Phetchaburi consisted of a 12 km long "siding" on the beach of Hat Chao Samran, which served only that 1921-1923 King Vajiravudh (Rama VI) and his court could travel by special train directly to the local summer palace. The branch station for this connection was called Phra Ram Ratchaniwet and was abandoned as well as the track to Hat Chao Samran when the king did not go there in summer.
- Songkhla Branch Line (1914–1978): The section south of Songkhla, is 29 km long and was opened on 1 January 1914. The branch station was initially U-Taphao Junction (925.80 km from Bangkok). The location of the branch station was a poor choice as it was located in the flood area of Khlong U-Taphao. TAs a result the branch was relocated in 1922 to the newly built Hat Yai Junction (km 928.58). The Songkhla branch line was shut down on July 1, 1978.

== Security Issues ==
The Southern Line, especially the section between Hat Yai to Sungai Kolok, has been the target of terrorist attacks of the South Thailand Insurgency. All stations and halts between Hat Yai Junction and Sungai Kolok have been fenced off and gates are opened and closed only during operating hours. Trains operate only during the day between 06:00 and 18:00.

== Gallery ==
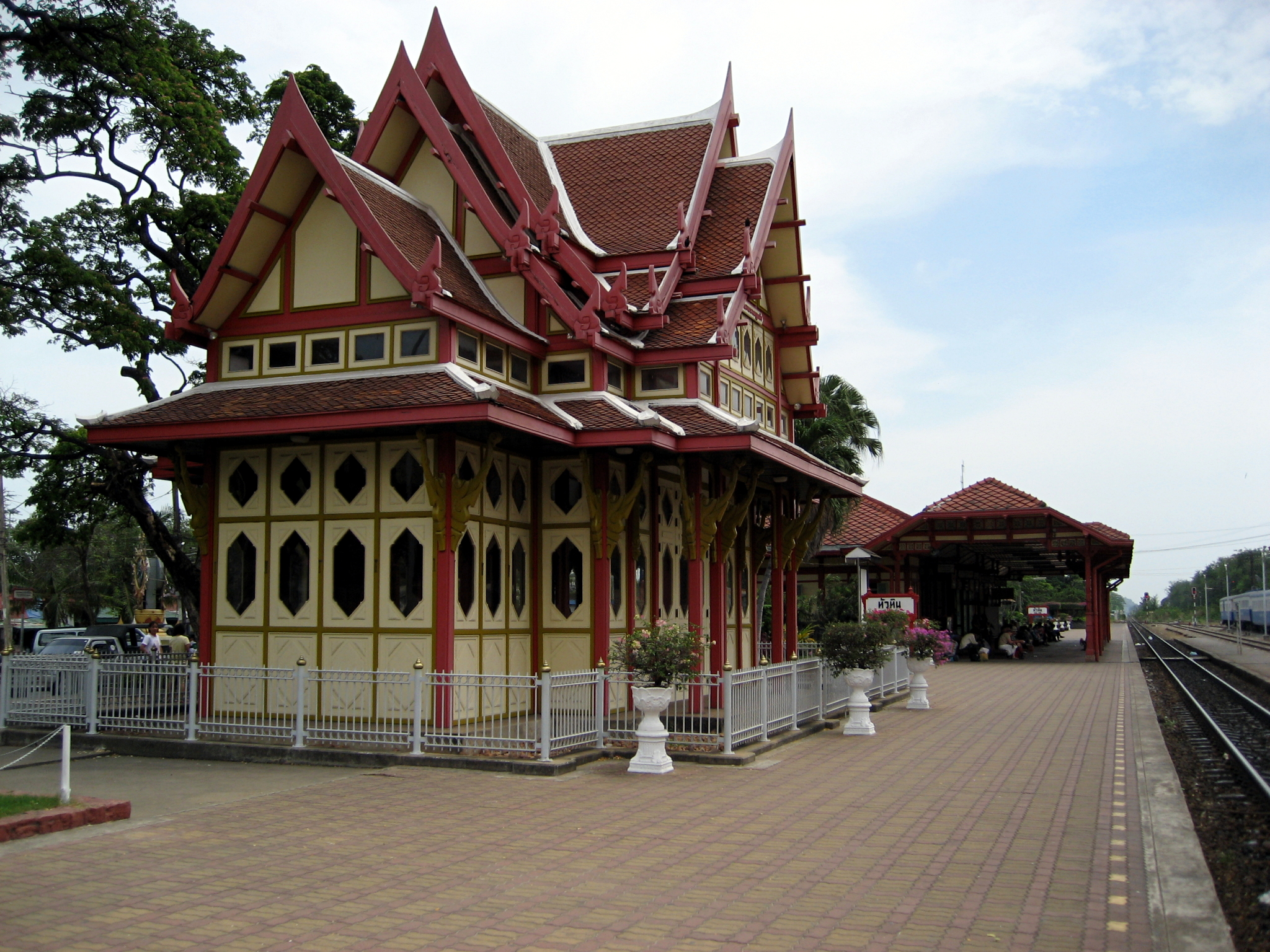
Hua Hin railway station, a beautiful station on the Su-ngai Kolok Main Line

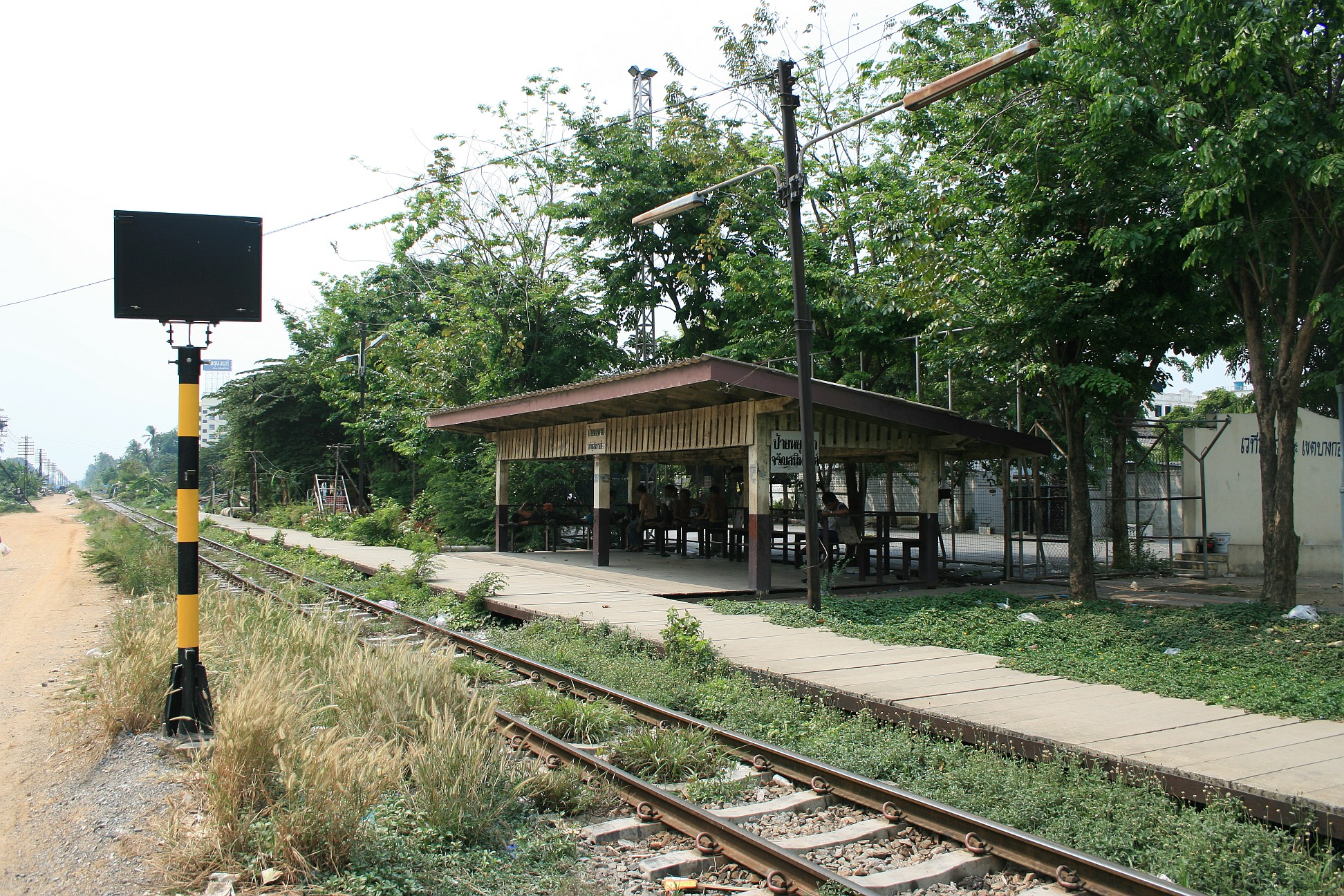
Charansanitwong Halt on the short Thon Buri Line

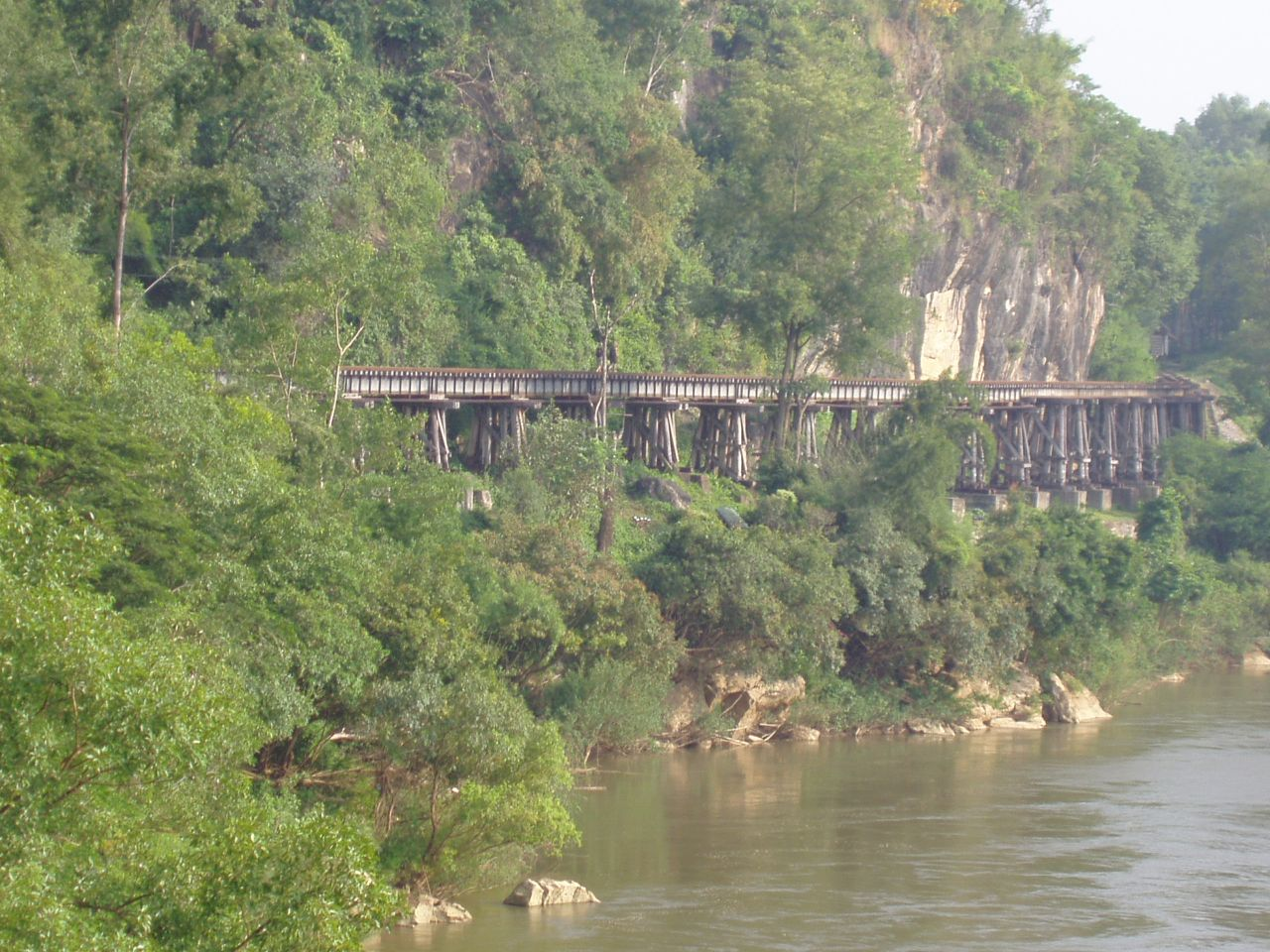
Kra Sae Cave Railway Viaduct on the Burma Railway

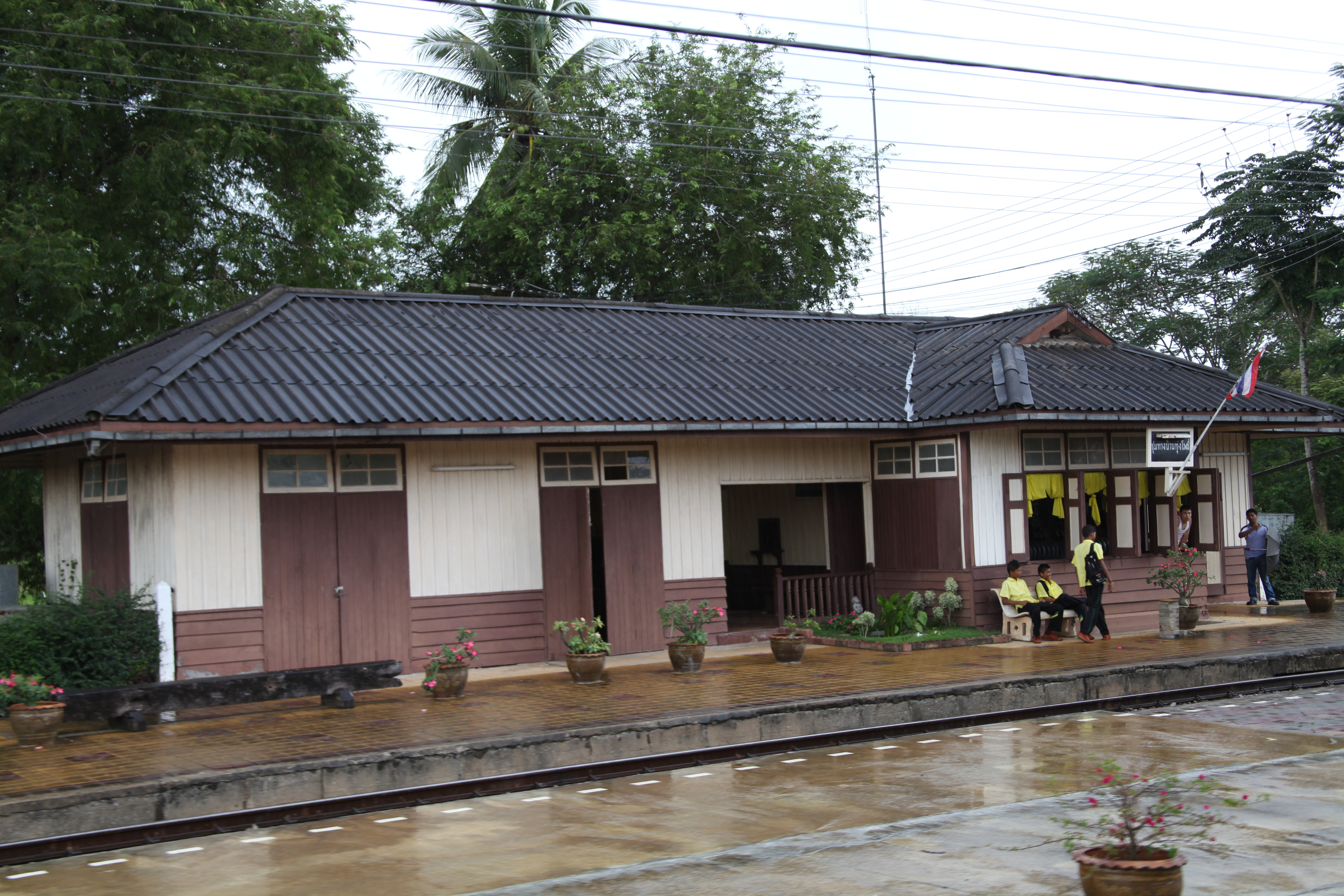
Ban Thung Pho Junction, a station of the Su-ngai Kolok Main Line and Khiri Rat Nikhom Line

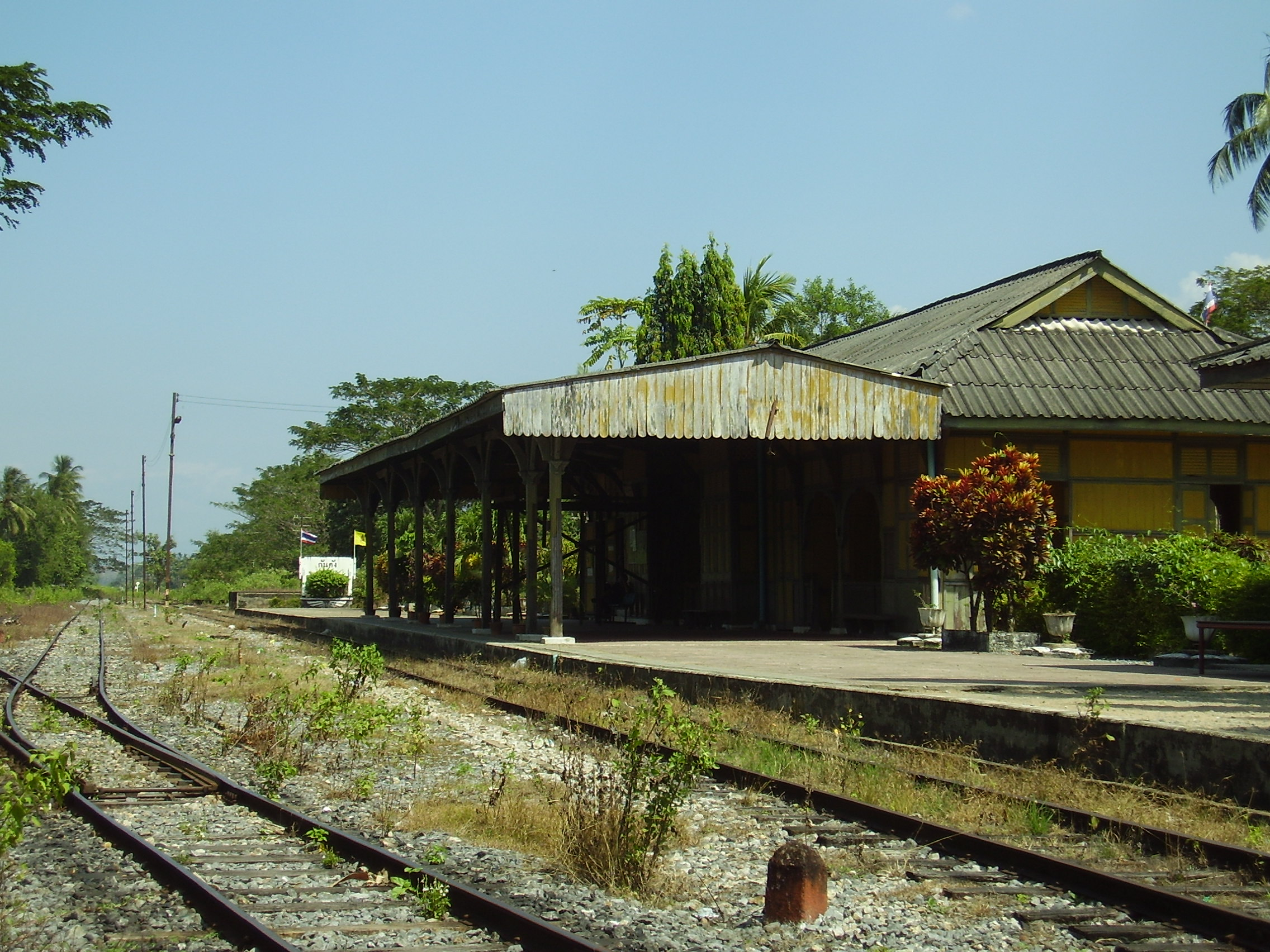
Kantang railway station, terminal station of the Kantang Line

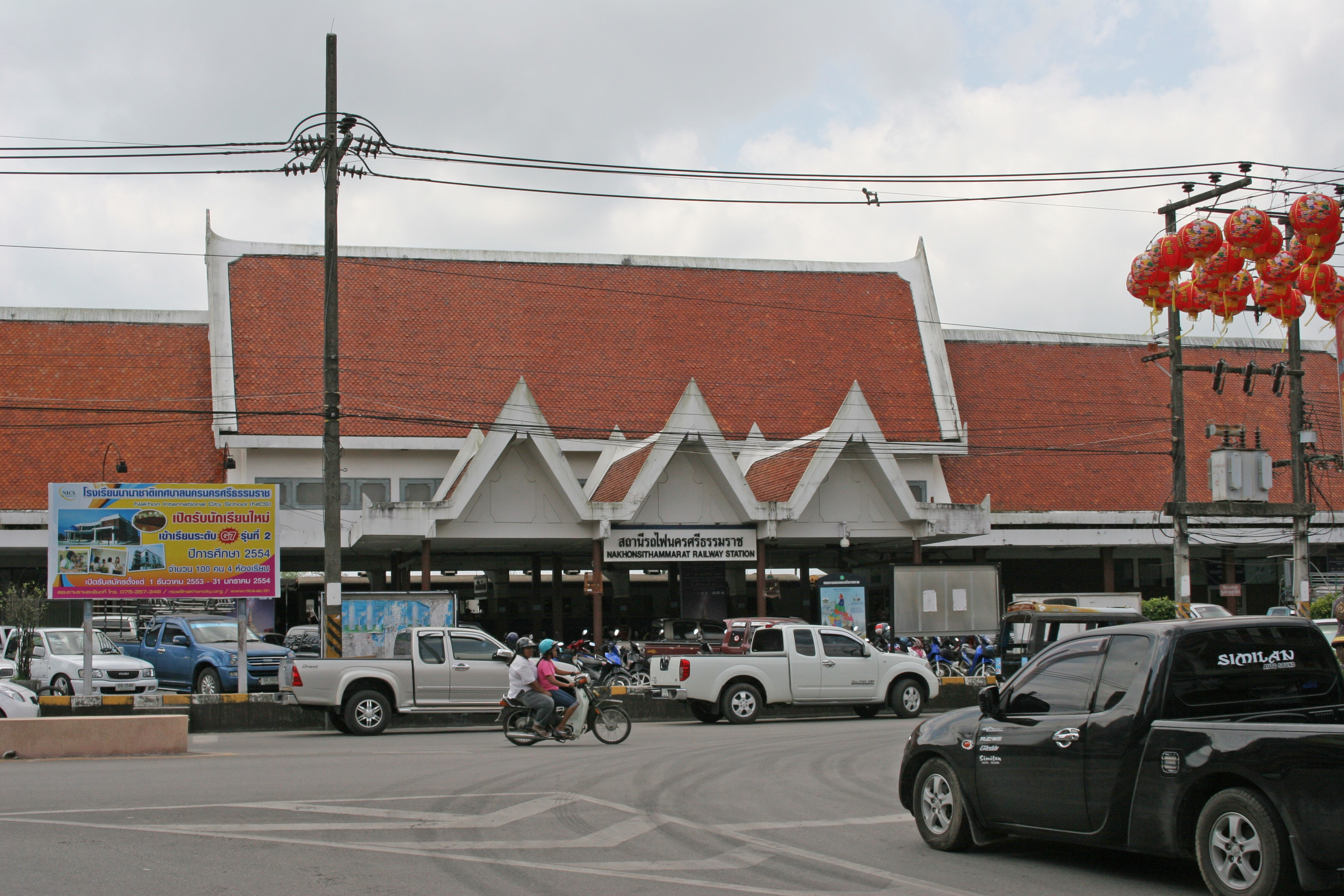
Nakhon Si Thammarat railway station, terminal station of the Nakhon Si Thammarat Line

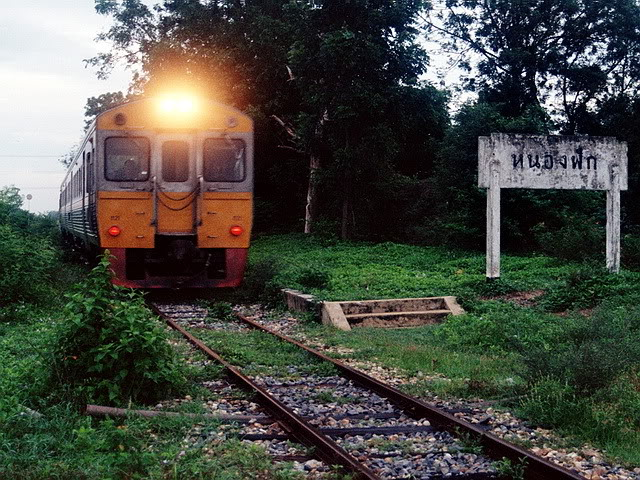
Commuter train no. 356 passed defunct Nong Fak Railway Halt on the Suphanburi Line.

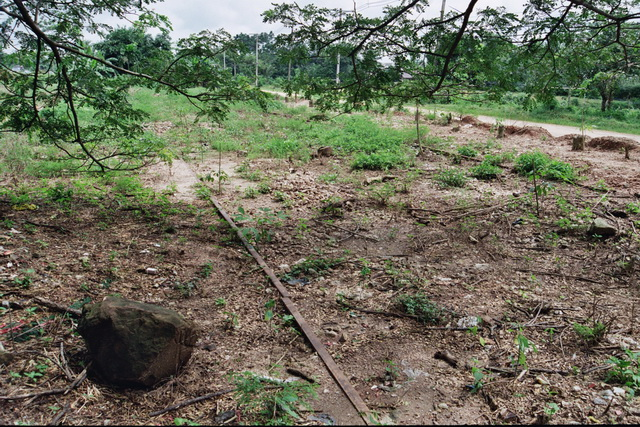
The defunct Songkhla Line at Nam Noi Station

== See also ==
- List of Southern Line (Thailand) stations
- Northern Line (Thailand)
- Northeastern Line (Thailand)
- Eastern Line (Thailand)
- KTM West Coast railway line
