= Transport in Thailand =

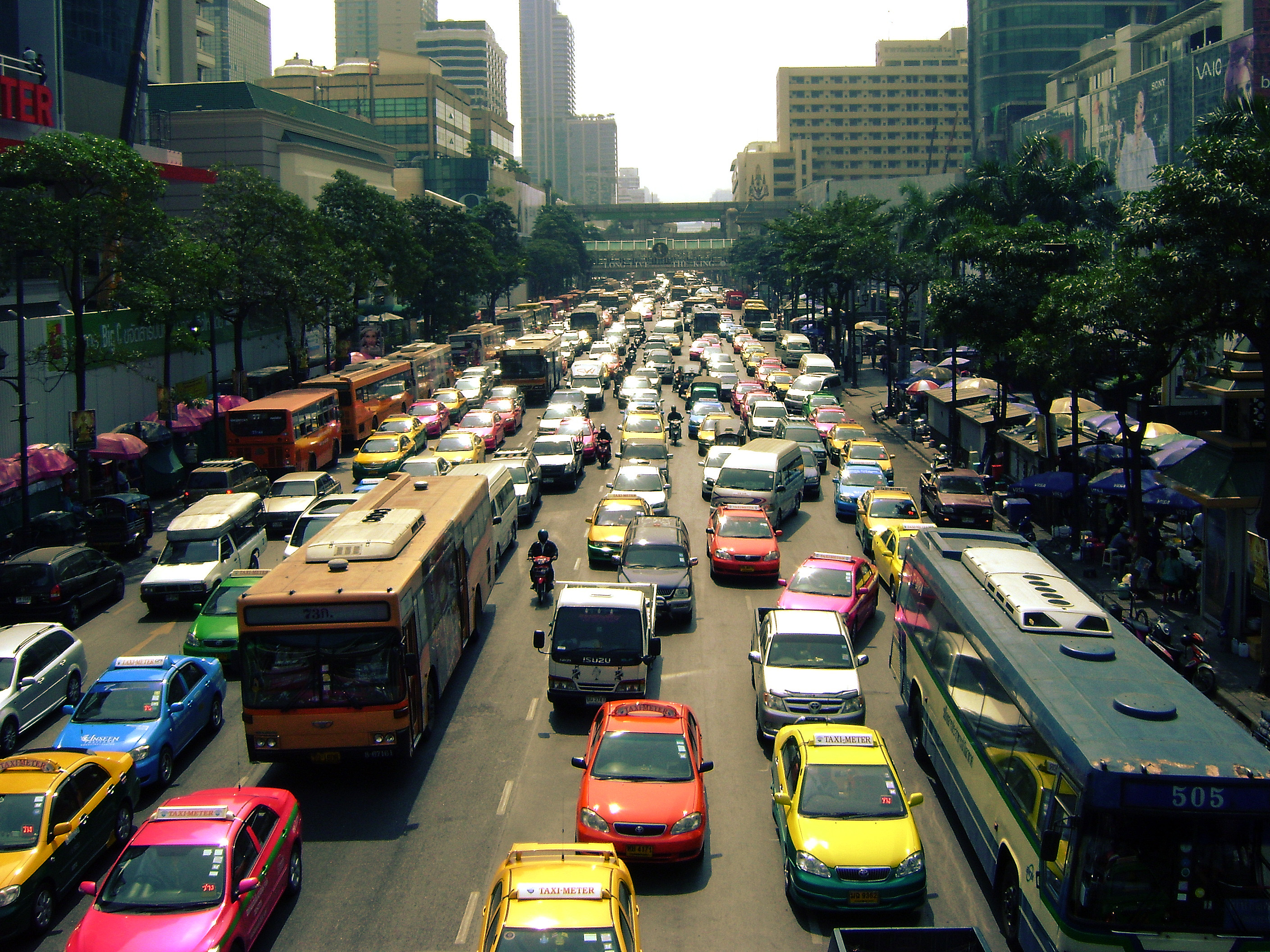
A large number of buses, minibuses and taxis share the streets with private vehicles at Ratchadamri Road, Bangkok.

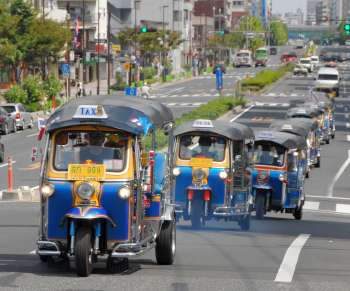
Tuk-tuks are one mode of public transport in Bangkok and other cities in Thailand.

Transport in Thailand is varied, with no one dominant means of transport. For long-distance travel, bus transport dominates. Low-speed rail travel has long been a rural long-distance transport mechanism, though plans are underway to expand services with high-speed rail lines extending to several major regions of Thailand. Road transportation is the primary form of freight transport across the country. Public transportation is underdeveloped, though not as severely as in some other Southeast Asian countries such as Indonesia and the Philippines.

For short trips, motorbikes are common. There are public motorcycle taxis in Bangkok, Pattaya, and other large cities. An overwhelming number of taxis can also be found in Bangkok. Since the country's first rapid rail transit line opened in 1999 in Bangkok, daily ridership on Bangkok's various transit lines has risen to over 800,000, with multiple additional lines either under construction or being proposed.

Private automobiles, whose rapid growth contributed to Bangkok's notorious traffic congestion over the past two decades, have risen in popularity, especially among tourists, expats, the upper class, and the growing middle class. A motorway network across Thailand has gradually been built, with motorways completed in Bangkok and most of central Thailand.

Domestic air transport, which had been dominated by a select few air carriers, saw a surge in popularity since 2010 due in large part to the expanding services of low-cost carriers such as Thai Air Asia and Nok Air.

Areas with navigable waterways often have boats or boat service, and many innovative means of transport exist such as tuk-tuk, vanpool, songthaew, and even elephants in rural areas.

== Rail transport ==
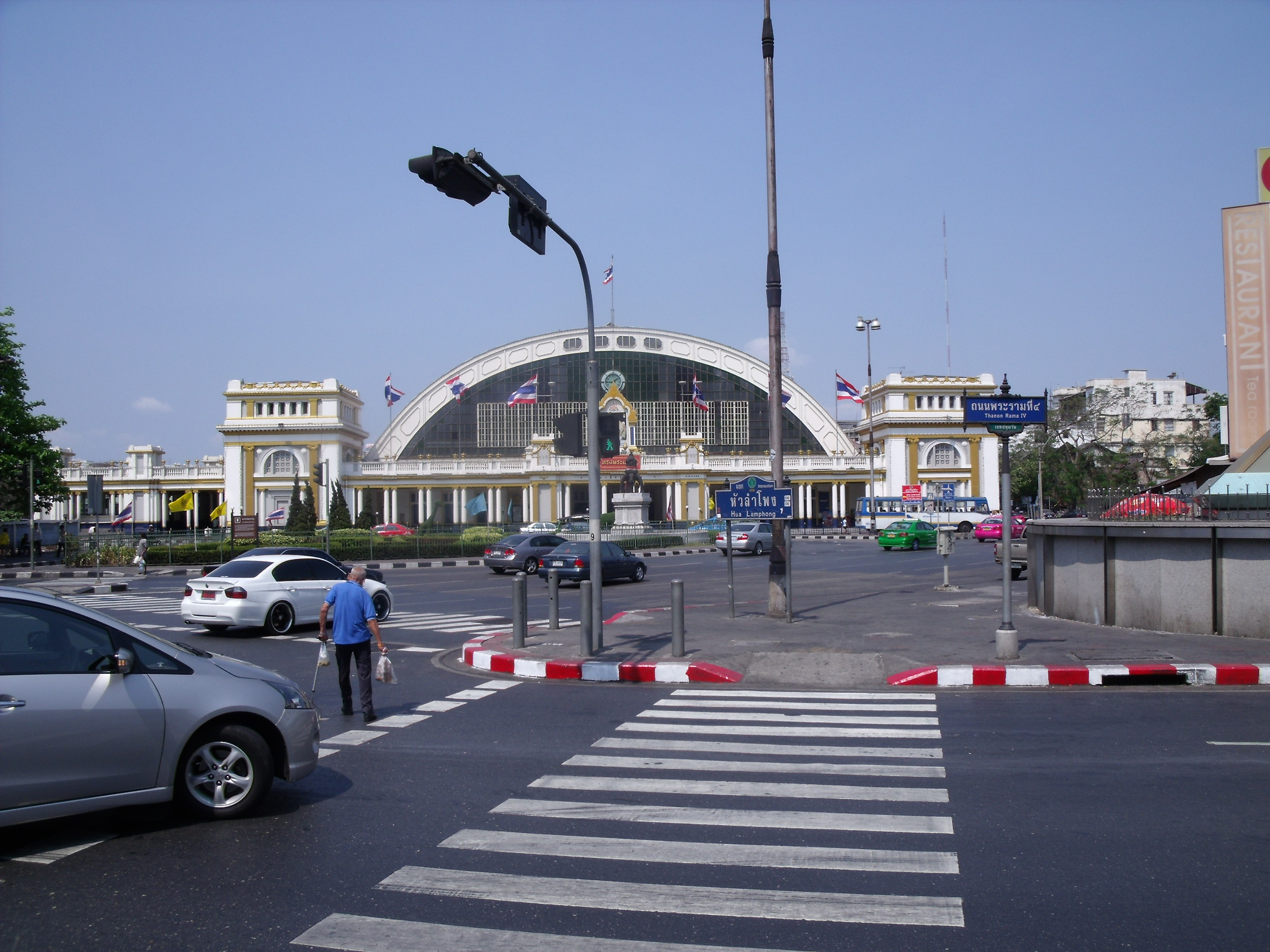
Hua Lamphong Railway Station.

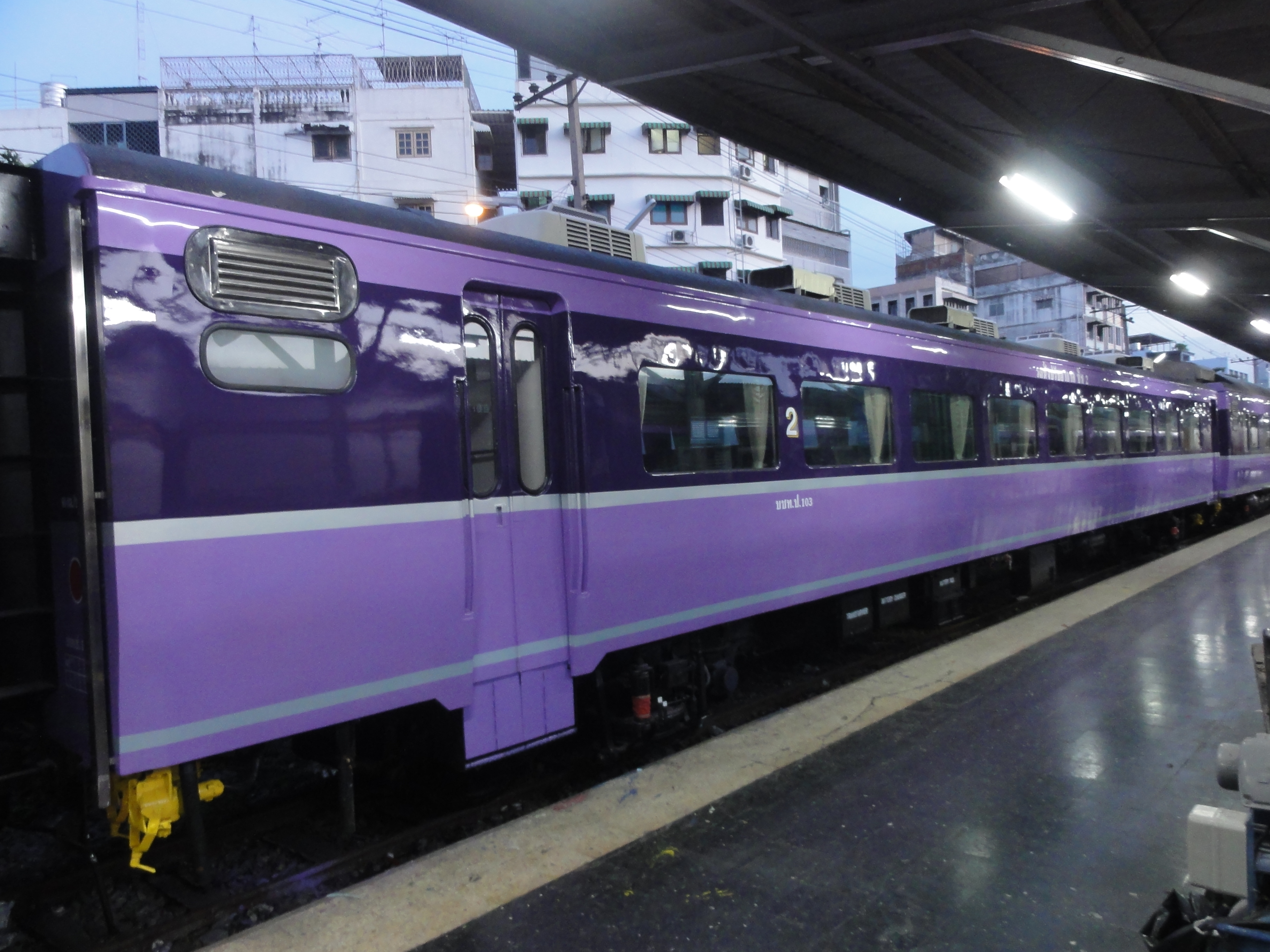
Second-class sleeping carriage of the State Railway of Thailand at Hua Lamphong Railway Station

The State Railway of Thailand (SRT) operates all of Thailand's national rail lines. Krung Thep Aphiwat Central Terminal is the main terminus of all routes, replacing the former main station, Bangkok Railway Station (Hua Lamphong Station), in 2023. Phahonyothin and ICD Lat Krabang are the main freight terminals.

As of 2025 SRT had 4,507 km (2,801 mi) of track, all of it meter gauge except the Airport Link. Nearly all is single-track (2702.1 km), although some important sections around Bangkok are double (1,234.9 km or 767.3 mi) or triple-tracked (107 km or 66 mi) and there are plans to extend this. By comparison, Thailand has 390,000 km (242,335 miles) of highways.

The SRT has long been perceived by the public as inefficient and resistant to change. Trains are usually late, and most of its equipment is old and poorly maintained. The worst financially performing state enterprise, the SRT consistently operates at a loss despite being endowed with large amounts of property and receiving large government budgets; it reported a preliminary loss of 7.58 billion baht in 2010. Recurring government attempts at restructuring and/or privatization throughout the 2000s have always been strongly opposed by the trade unions and have not made any progress.

There are two active rail links to neighboring countries. The line to Malaysia uses the same 1,000 mm (3 ft 3 3/8 in) gauge, as does the line to Laos across the Mekong River on the First Thai-Lao Friendship Bridge. The line to Cambodia is currently disused and is being rebuilt, while the line to Myanmar is defunct (see Death Railway). A projected extension will rebuild the route and in 2011 a link was also proposed from Kanchanaburi to Port Dawei.

Rail transport in Bangkok includes long-distance services, and some daily commuter trains running from and to the outskirts of the city during the rush hour, but passenger numbers have remained low. There are also three rapid transit rail systems in the capital.

=== Rail rapid transit systems ===
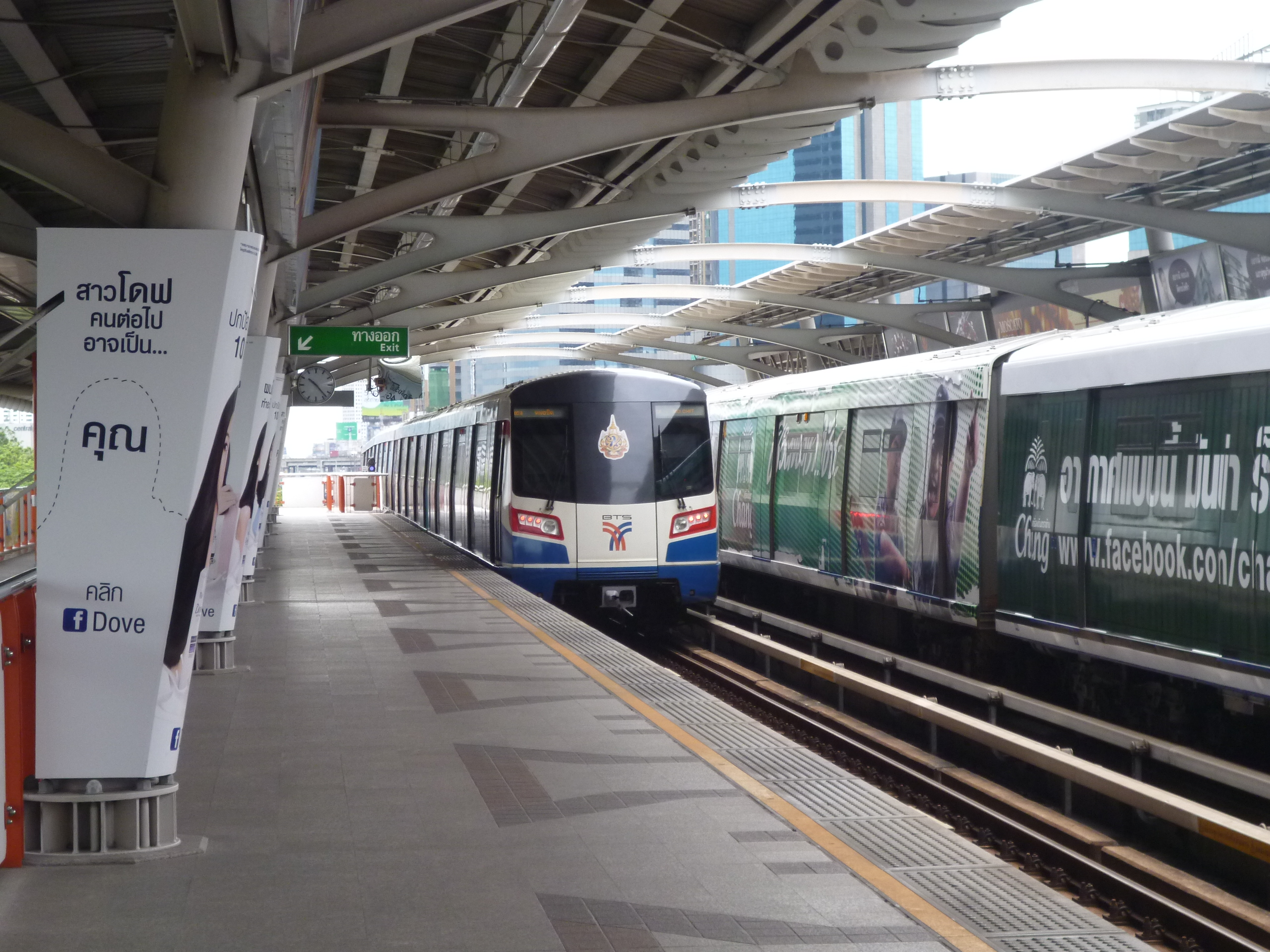
Bangkok BTS skytrain at Mo Chit BTS station

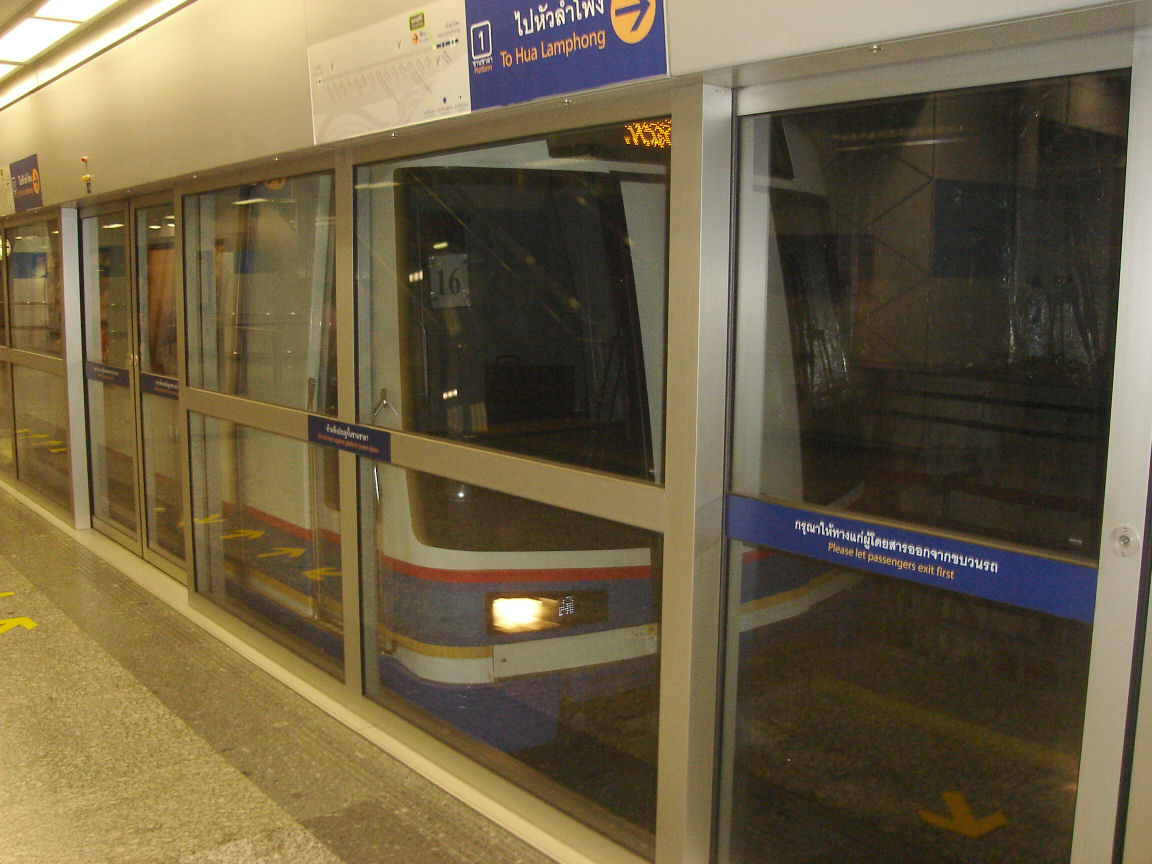
Bangkok Metro at Si Lom MRT station

==== Bangkok Metropolitan Region ====
Bangkok is served by four rail rapid transit systems:

- MRT, with four lines.
- Bangkok Skytrain or BTS, with three lines.
- Suvarnabhumi Airport Link or ARL, with one line.
- SRT Red Lines, with two lines.

==== Other Provinces ====
Several other rapid transit systems have been proposed but have not been approved or started construction as of 2025: Chiang Mai LRT, Pattaya LRT, Phuket LRT, Hat Yai monorail and Khon Kaen LRT.

=== Tram ===
Thailand had two tramway systems, both of which are now defunct. Trams operated in Bangkok between 1888 and 1968 when it was closed to make way for road traffic. At its peak, a total of eleven tram lines operated in the city, with a cumulative total length of 53.5 km.

Another short-lived tramway system operated in Lopburi between 1955 and 1962. This system consisted of a single 6.5 km line.

=== Automated people mover ===
The Suvarnabhumi Airport Automated People Mover is an automated people mover in Suvarnabhumi Airport, first opened for service on 28 September 2023, running between the main terminal building and Satellite-1 terminal (SAT-1), a distance of 1 kilometer. Currently, there is only one service in Suvarnabhumi Airport.

== Road transport ==
Thailand has 390,000 km (242,335 miles) of highways. According to the BBC, Thailand has 462,133 roads and many multi-lane highways. As of 2017 Thailand had 37 million registered vehicles, 20 million of them two or three-wheeled motorbikes, and millions more that are unregistered. It also had one million "heavy trucks", 158,000 buses, and 624,000 "other" vehicles. By mid-2019 the number of registered vehicles in Thailand had risen to 40,190,328. The majority—21,051,977—were motorbikes. Private cars with up to seven seats numbered 9,713,980.

=== Road safety ===
According to the World Health Organization's, Global Status Report on Road Safety 2018, Thailand had an estimated traffic fatality rate (all vehicle types) of 32.7 persons per 100,000 population in 2016. The only countries with a higher death toll were Liberia; Saint Lucia (population: 178,000); Burundi; Zimbabwe; Dominican Republic; Democratic Republic of Congo; Venezuela; and the Central African Republic.

Thailand's death rate for operators and passengers of motorized two- and three-wheeled motorbikes was the world's highest in 2016, with 74.4 fatalities per 100,000 population.

Sixty-six persons die every day on Thai roads, one every 22 minutes, seven of them children. In 2015, Thailand's roads were the second deadliest in the world in 2015. Among public transport options, passenger vans, with a monthly average of 19.5 accidents resulting in a monthly average of 9.4 deaths, rank as the most dangerous of all public transport services involved in road accidents. Regular tour buses on fixed routes were in second place with a total of 141 accidents, resulting in 56 deaths and 1,252 injuries. Third on the list were irregular tour buses, involved in 52 accidents, resulting in 47 deaths and 576 injuries. Taxis were fourth with 77 accidents, resulting in seven deaths and 84 injuries. Ordinary buses were involved in 48 accidents with 10 deaths and 75 injuries. As of 31 October 2016, there were 156,089 legally registered public transport vehicles in Thailand, 42,202 of which were passenger vans, including 16,002 regular vans, 24,136 irregular vans, and 1,064 private vans.

One of the underlying reasons for the high frequency of traffic accidents in Thailand is the underdevelopment of public transport. Especially the extensive use of motorbikes leads to a large number accidents. From 2013 to 2017, an average of 17,634 children between the ages of 10–19 died on Thailand's roads. Most of the fatalities involved motorbikes.

The two most dangerous travel periods in Thailand are around New Year's Eve and Songkran. Songkran 2016 (11-17 April) saw 442 deaths and 3,656 injuries. New Year 2017's death toll for the seven-day period between 29 December 2016 and 4 January 2017 was 478 compared to the previous year's record of 380. A total of 4,128 people were injured in road accidents during the period. The Centre for the Prevention and Reduction of Road Accidents said that the death toll in 2016 was the highest of the last ten years. Death toll records from road accidents for the last ten New Year periods are: 449 deaths in 2007, 401 in 2008, 357 in 2009, 347 in 2010, 358 in 2011, 321 in 2012, 365 in 2013, 366 in 2014, 341 in 2015, 380 in 2016. Lax enforcement of traffic laws appears to be a major contributor to traffic accidents: the World Health Organization's Collaborating Centre for Injury Prevention and Safety Promotion found that only 20 percent of traffic violators on Thai roads are given tickets and only four percent pay their fines.

Government attempts to reduce the toll of deaths and injuries have proven ineffectual. In 2011 the government declared the following ten years to be Thailand's "decade of action on road safety". It named 2012 as the year of 100 percent helmet use on motorbikes. In 2015, about 1.3 million school-age children in Thailand regularly traveled on the back of motorcycles each day but only seven percent wore helmets. In 2018, the WHO reported that motorcycle helmet use was 51 percent by operators and 20 percent by passengers. In 2015 the Interior Ministry's Department of Disaster Prevention and Mitigation's (DDPM) Road Safety Collaboration Centre announced a target of reducing road deaths by 80 percent. According to The New York Times, in 2015, Thailand vowed at a United Nations forum to halve traffic deaths by 2020. But DDPM's published mandate makes no mention of road safety. Road safety falls under the purview of the Ministry of Interior's DDPM. Responsibility for roads falls under the Ministry of Transport.

Thailand had no laws requiring child safety features or a rear seating position in vehicles, but, the government announced that the use of child seat is mandatory and the violators would be fined since Sep 2022.

==== National speed limits ====
The maximum rural speed limit is 90 km/h. For motorways it is 120 km/h. The maximum urban speed limit is 80 km/h, far above the best practice limit of 50 km/h recommended by the WHO.

=== Public bus service ===
Buses are a major method of transportation for people, freight, and small parcels, and are the most popular means of long-distance travel. Tour and VIP class long-distance buses tend to be luxurious, while city- and other-class buses are often very colorful with paint schemes and advertising.

There are two main types of long-distance buses in Thailand:

- those run by The Transport Company, Ltd., (TCL), the state-owned bus company. Known to Thais by the initials บขส (pronounced baw-kaw-saw), this 80-year-old company was formed by the government to ensure that citizens in even the most far-flung localities had access to the capital city, Bangkok. TCL buses are easily identified by the large golden coat of arms appliqued to each side of the bus.
- those operated by private bus companies offer hundreds of routes in various service categories (express, VIP, local, air conditioned)

==== Public bus service in Bangkok ====
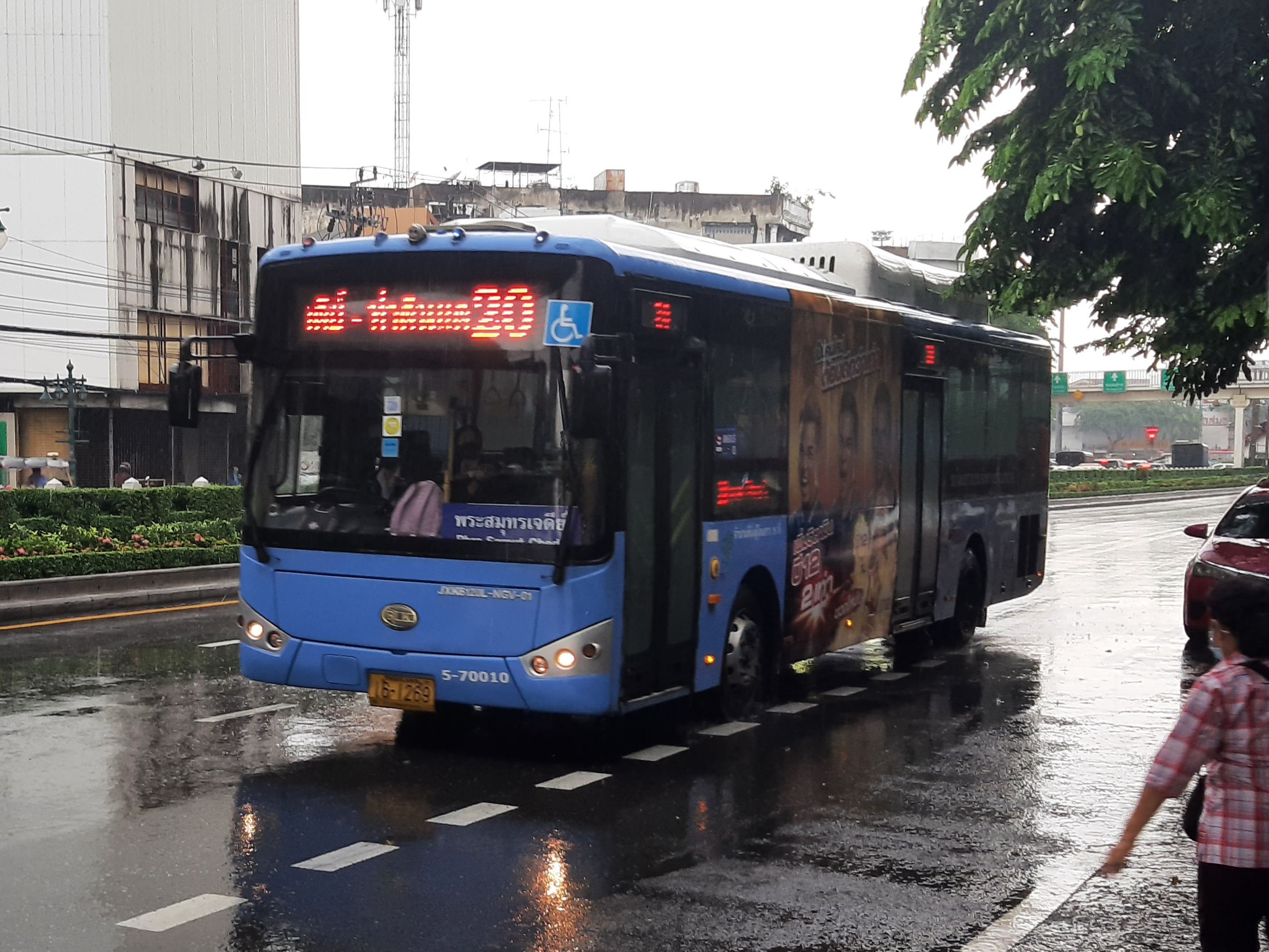
An air conditioned BMTA bus, one type of public bus service in Bangkok.

Bangkok has far better public transit than the rest of the country. The Bangkok Mass Transit Authority or BMTA, is the main operator of public transit buses within the Greater Bangkok area. The Bangkok Mass Transit Authority offers bus and van routes throughout the city and its suburban provinces. Many bus routes in Bangkok are served by several private companies, sometimes duplicating those from BMTA. Examples include orange minibuses, and cream-blue buses. The buses have the BMTA symbol on them, mostly seen below the driver's side window. These often follow slightly different routings from the main big BMTA bus or do not run along the whole route.

BMTA currently operates bus routes in Bangkok and its metropolitan area namely Nonthaburi, Pathum Thani, Samut Prakan, Samut Sakhon and Nakhon Pathom.

Local buses and Bangkok city buses come in various sizes, types, and prices, from half size, full size, double length, open window, fan, and air conditioned.

===== Bus rapid transit system in Bangkok =====
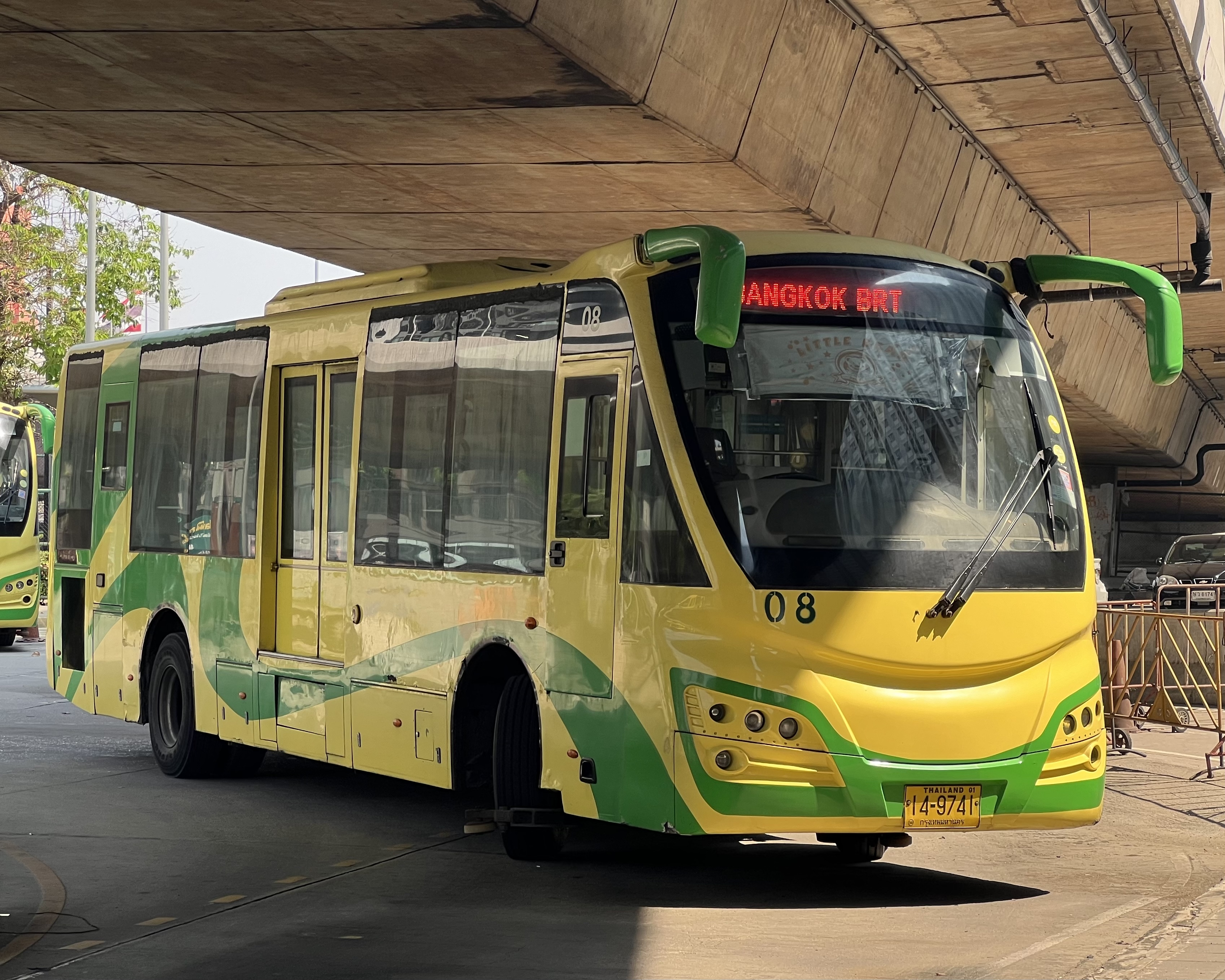
A Bangkok BRT bus at the Ratchaphruek terminus

The Bangkok BRT is a bus rapid transit system in Bangkok. Of five routes that were originally planned, only one line has been operating since 2010. The 16 kilometres (9.9 mi) route has twelve stations in the centre of the road that give at-grade access to the right-hand side of the buses. Both terminals connect to the Silom Line of the BTS Skytrain; at Chong Nonsi (S3) and Talat Phlu (S10). The buses used are all Sunlong SLK6125CNG buses.

=== Highway network ===
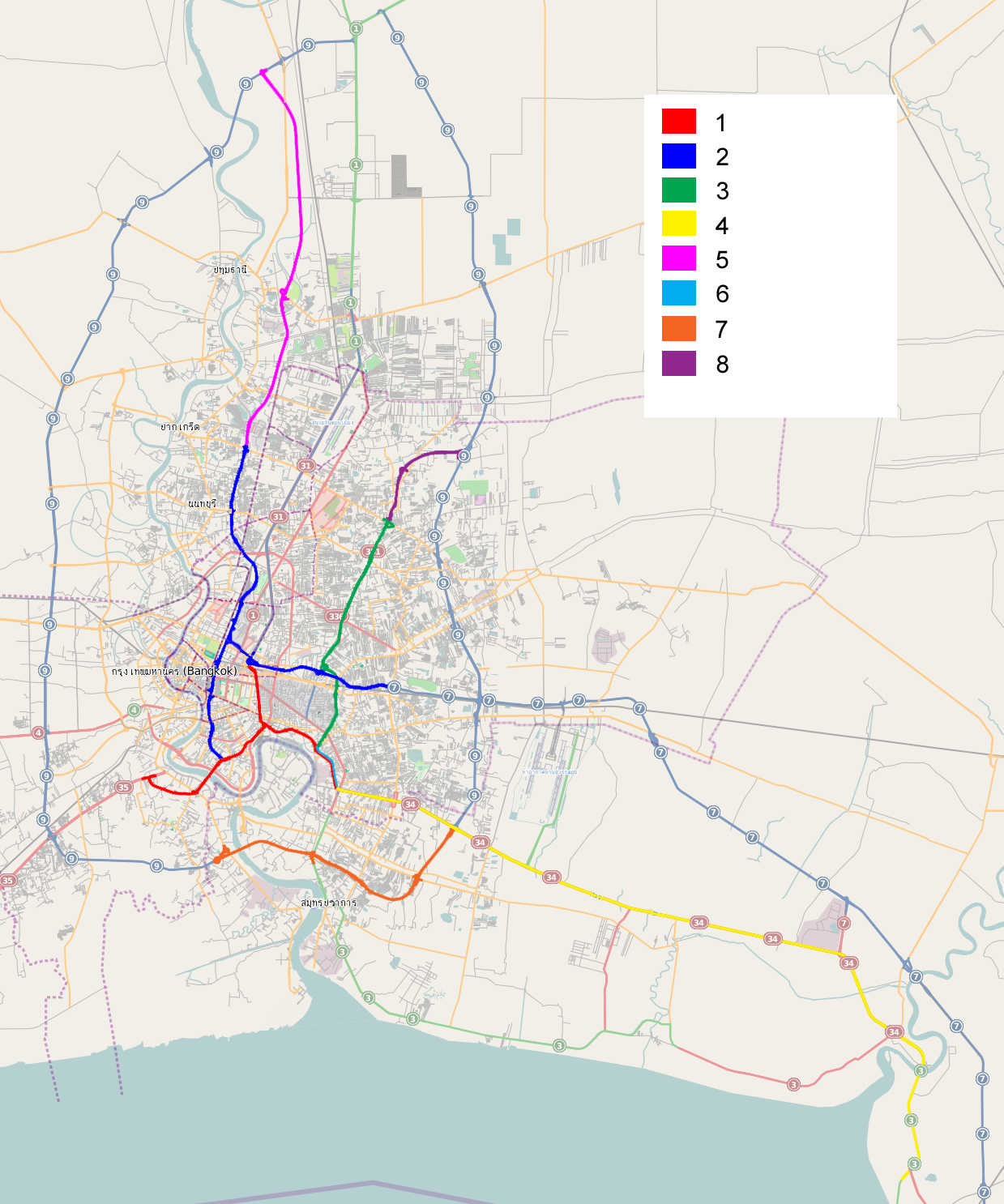
An overview map of Bangkok's expressway system.

The Thai highway network links every part of Thailand. Most highways are in good state of repair, greatly enhancing safety and speed. The four-lane highways often have overhead concrete pedestrian crossings interspersed about every 250 meters in populated areas. There are few on and off ramps on eight-lane highways, most highways are separated by medians with breakage for U-turns, except on major roads where ramp style U-turns predominate.

A number of undivided two-lane highways have been converted into divided four-lane highways. A Bangkok – Chon Buri motorway (Route 7) now links to the new airport and Eastern seaboard.

=== Motorway network ===
The Thai motorway network is small. Coupled with Bangkok's extensive expressway network, the motorways provide a relief from regular traffic in Bangkok. The Thai Government is planning infrastructure investment in various "megaprojects", including motorway expansion to approximately 6,877 kilometers.

=== Expressway network ===
Thailand uses the expressway term for the toll road or highway network. Most expressways are elevated with some sections at ground level. The current expressway network covers major parts of Bangkok and suburban areas. Expressways are used to avoid heavy traffic jams in Bangkok and reduce traffic time but are sometimes congested in rush hour.

=== Utility cycling ===
The Thai state has failed at promoting utility cycling as a mode of transport. Officials regard bicycles as toys, and cycling as a leisure activity, not as a means of transport that could help solve traffic and environmental problems. Their attitude was on display at Bangkok's celebration of World Car-Free Day 2018, celebrated on 22 September. Bangkok's Deputy Governor, Sakoltee Phattiyakul, who presided over the event, arrived in his official automobile, as did his entourage. He then mounted a bicycle for a ceremonial ride. Prior to the event, which encouraged the non-use of cars, the BMA announced there would be extensive free automobile parking spaces available for participants who were to ride bicycles in the parade.

In his first year office, Prime Minister Prayut Chan-o-cha launched a cycling initiative, encouraging members of the public to cycle. But state investment in cycling lanes ended up a being a waste as they quickly devolved into parking lanes for motorists. All Thai rail companies, whether commuter or long distance, make on-board transport of bicycles difficult or impractical. Without state intervention, direction, and education, the public lacks the impetus to adopt a mode of transport that remains ignored by urban development projects.

=== Other public transport ===
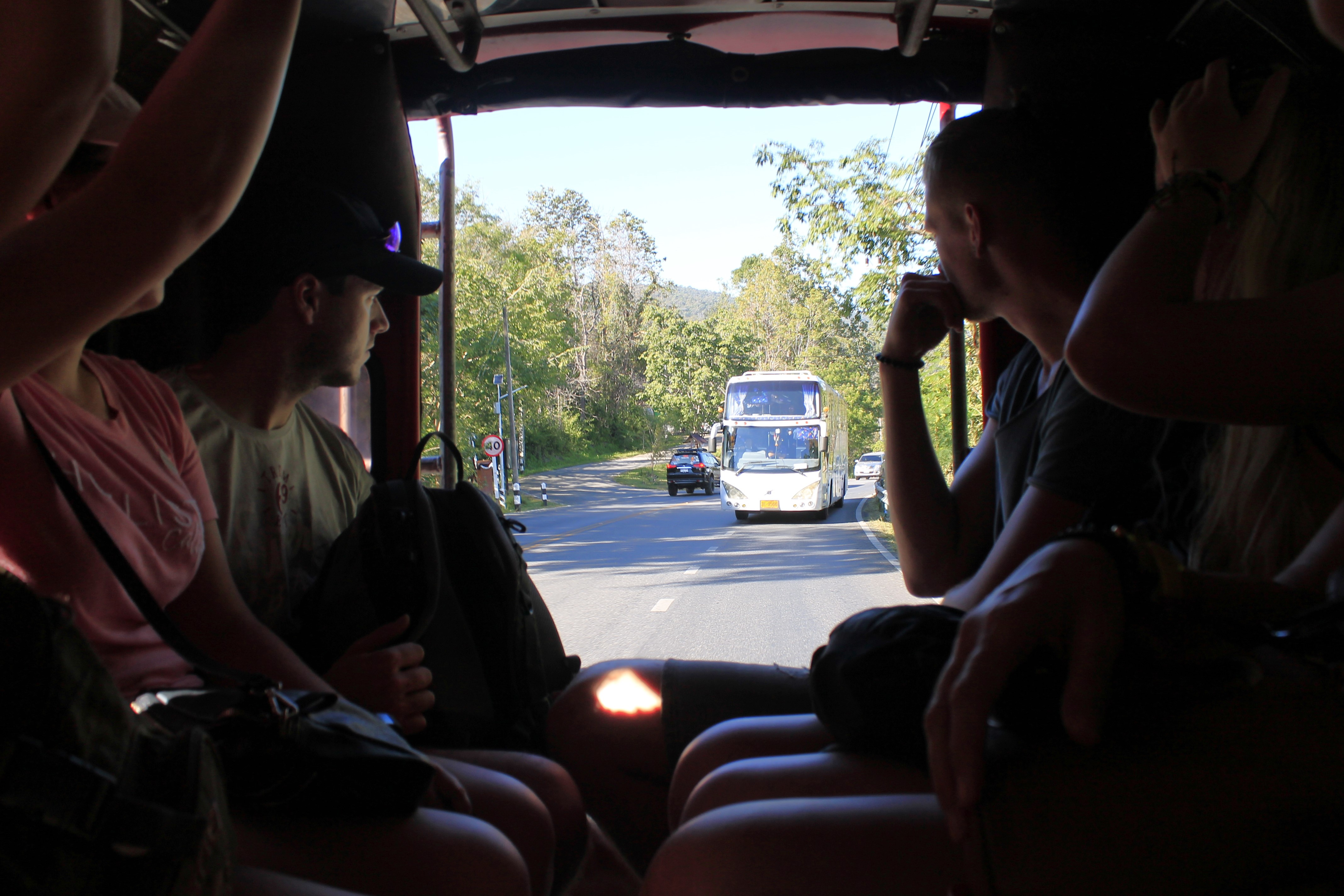
Riding inside a songthaew

Other forms of road transport includes tuk-tuks, taxis—as of November 2018, Thailand has 80,647 registered taxis nationwide—vans (minibus), motorbike taxis, and songthaews.

There are 4,125 public vans operating on 114 routes from Bangkok to the provinces alone. They are classed as Category 2 public transport vehicles (routes within 300 kilometres). Until 2016, most operated from a Bangkok terminus at Victory Monument. They are being moved from there to the Department of Land Transport's three Bangkok bus terminals.

Passenger vans have a disturbing safety record. The Safe Public Transport Travel Project of the Foundation for Consumers, reports that passenger vans in 2018 were involved in 75 accidents, causing 314 injuries and 41 deaths. In 2017 the numbers were 113 dead and 906 injured, and in 2016, 105 people died and 1,102 others were injured in passenger van accidents. A government initiative to replace existing vans with larger minibuses in 2017, then delayed to 2019, was put on hold by the incoming Prayut administration.

== Air transport ==
=== Airports ===
As of 2012, Thailand had 103 airports with 63 paved runways, in addition to 6 heliports. The busiest airport in the county is Bangkok's Suvarnabhumi Airport.

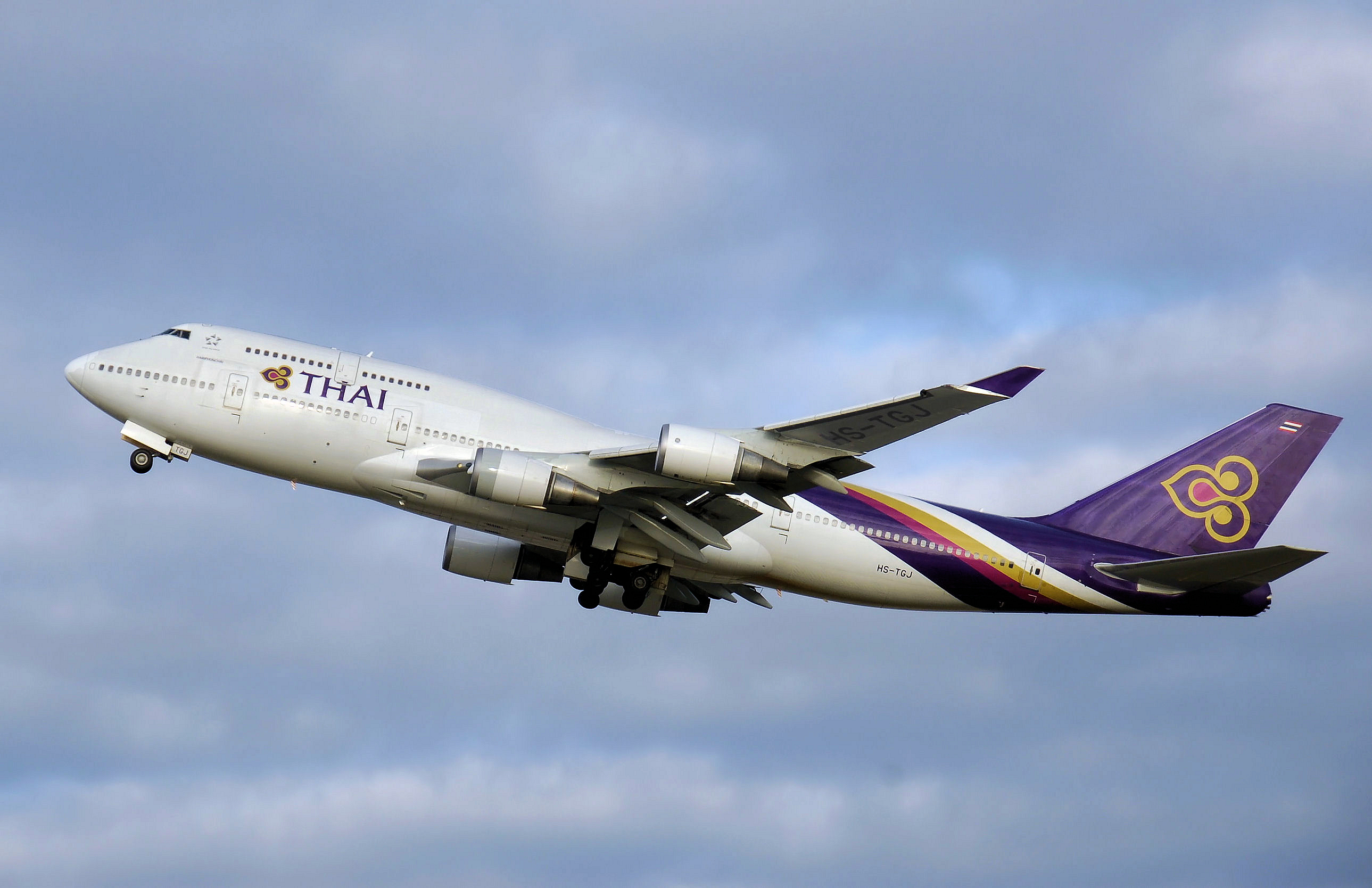
A Boeing 747-400 of the national carrier Thai Airways.

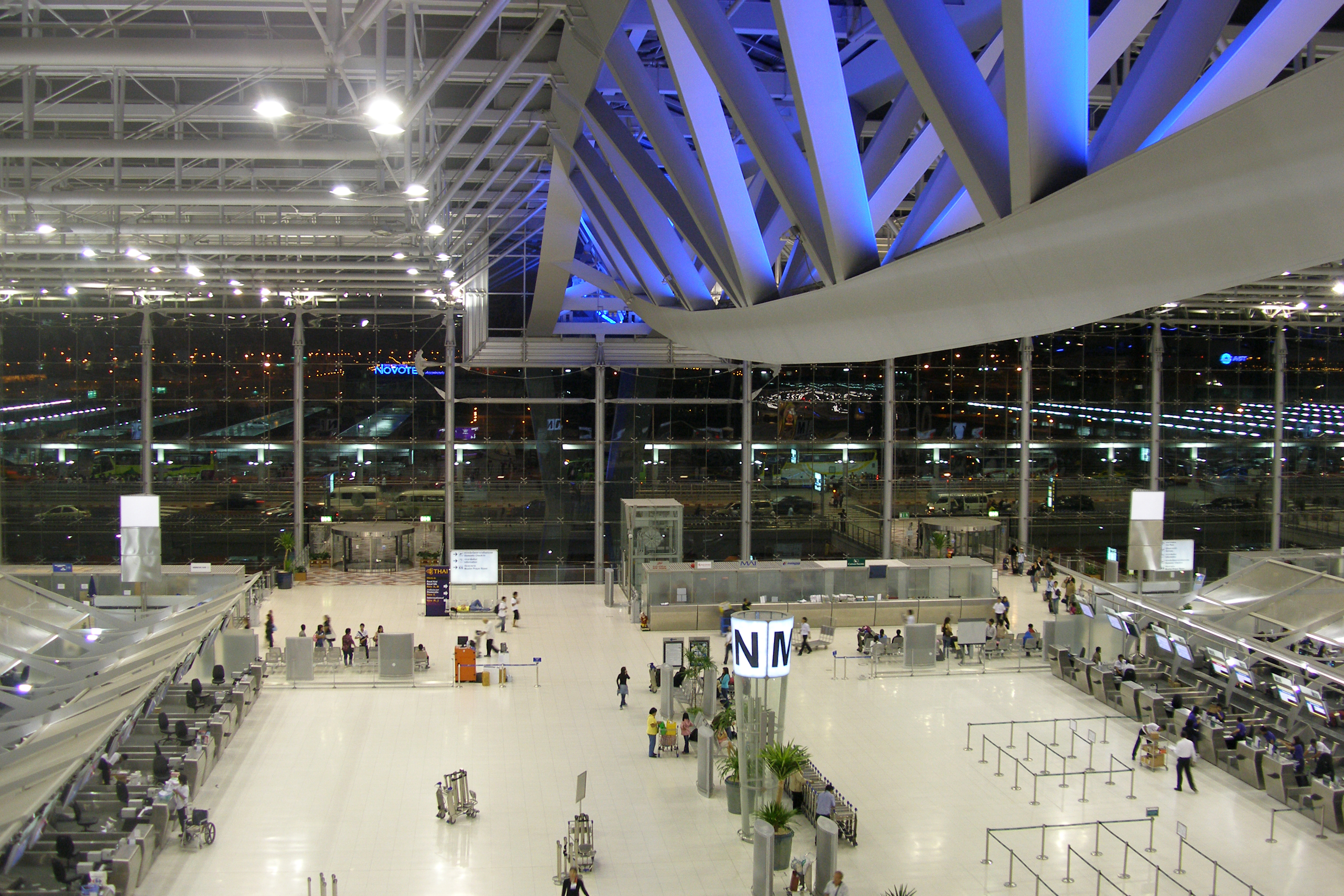
Suvarnabhumi Airport, Thailand.

Major international airports

- Suvarnabhumi Airport (BKK) (New Bangkok International Airport, a major international hub)
- Don Mueang International Airport (DMK) (Old Bangkok International, now used mostly by low-cost carriers)
- Chiang Mai International Airport (CNX)
- Chiang Rai International Airport (CEI)
- Hat Yai International Airport (HDY)
- Phuket International Airport (HKT)
- Krabi International Airport (KBV)
- Samui International Airport (USM)
- Surat Thani International Airport (URT)
- Udon Thani International Airport (UTH)
- Khon Kaen International Airport (KKC)
- U-Tapao International Airport (UTP)

=== Airlines ===
The national carrier of Thailand is Thai Airways International, founded in 1959. Bangkok Airways has been operating since 1968 and now markets itself as "Asia's Boutique Airline". Low-cost carriers have become prevalent since 2003, including Thai Smile, Thai AirAsia, Thai AirAsia X, Thai Lion Air, Thai Vietjet Air and Nok Air.

== Water transport ==
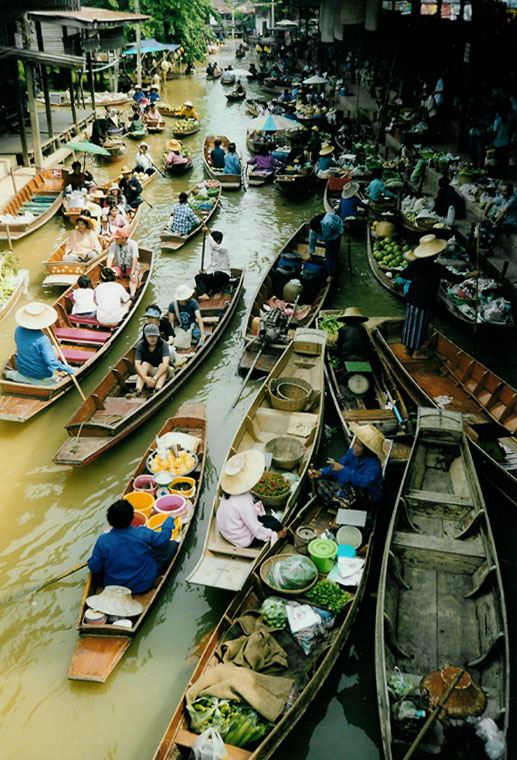
Damnoen Saduak floating market in Ratchaburi Province

As of 2011 there were 3,999 km of principal waterways, of which 3,701 km had navigable depths of 0.9 m or more throughout the year. There are numerous minor waterways navigable by shallow-draft native craft, such as long-tailed boats.

=== River and canal transport ===
In Bangkok, the Chao Phraya River is a major transportation artery, with ferries, water taxis (the Chao Phraya Express Boat) and long-tailed boats. There are local, semi-express, and express lines for commuters, though the winding river means trips can be much farther than by bus. There is also the Khlong Saen Saeb boat service, which provides fast, inexpensive transport in central Bangkok.

=== Ferries ===
Ferry service between hundreds of islands and the mainland is available, as well as across navigable rivers, such as Chao Phraya and Mae Khong (Mekong). There are a number of international ferries. In November 2018, Hua Hin deputy chief Chareewat Phramanee confirmed the ferry service, suspended due to low tourist numbers during low season, would be up and running again for high season between Hua Hin and Pattaya, a 2.5-hour journey for 1,250 Thai Bhat on a catamaran with a maximum capacity of 340.

=== Sea transport ===
In Thailand, the Gulf of Thailand and Andaman Sea is a transportation system:

- Trat – Ko Chang boat service
- Surat Thani – Ko Samui boat service
- Phuket – Phi Phi Islands boat service
- Phuket – Ao Nang boat service
- Bang Pu – Hua Hin – Pranburi boat service
- Bang Pu – Pattaya boat service
- Pattaya – Hua Hin – Pranburi boat service

=== Ports and harbors ===
- Bangkok
- Laem Ngop
- Laem Chabang near Si Racha
- Pattani
- Phuket (Patong)
- Sattahip
- Songkhla
- Ranong
- Satun

=== Merchant marine fleet ===
As of 2023 Thailand's merchant marine fleet consisted of 880 ships (1,000 GT or over) totaling 4,696,000 tonnes deadweight (DWT).

== Pipelines ==
Pipelines are used for bulk transport of gas (1,889 km as of 2010), liquid petroleum (85 km) and refined products: (1,099 km).

== See also ==
- Tuk-tuk
- Songthaew
- Motorcycle taxi
- Driving licence in Thailand
- Right- and left-hand traffic
- Vehicle registration plates of Thailand
- List of motor vehicle deaths in Thailand by year
- Transport in Bangkok
