= List of urban rail systems in Thailand =

List of urban rail systems in Thailand lists urban rail transit systems in Thailand. As of September 2025, all operational, as well as all under construction intracity rail systems in Thailand are within Bangkok Metropolitan Region.

== Bangkok Metropolitan Region ==
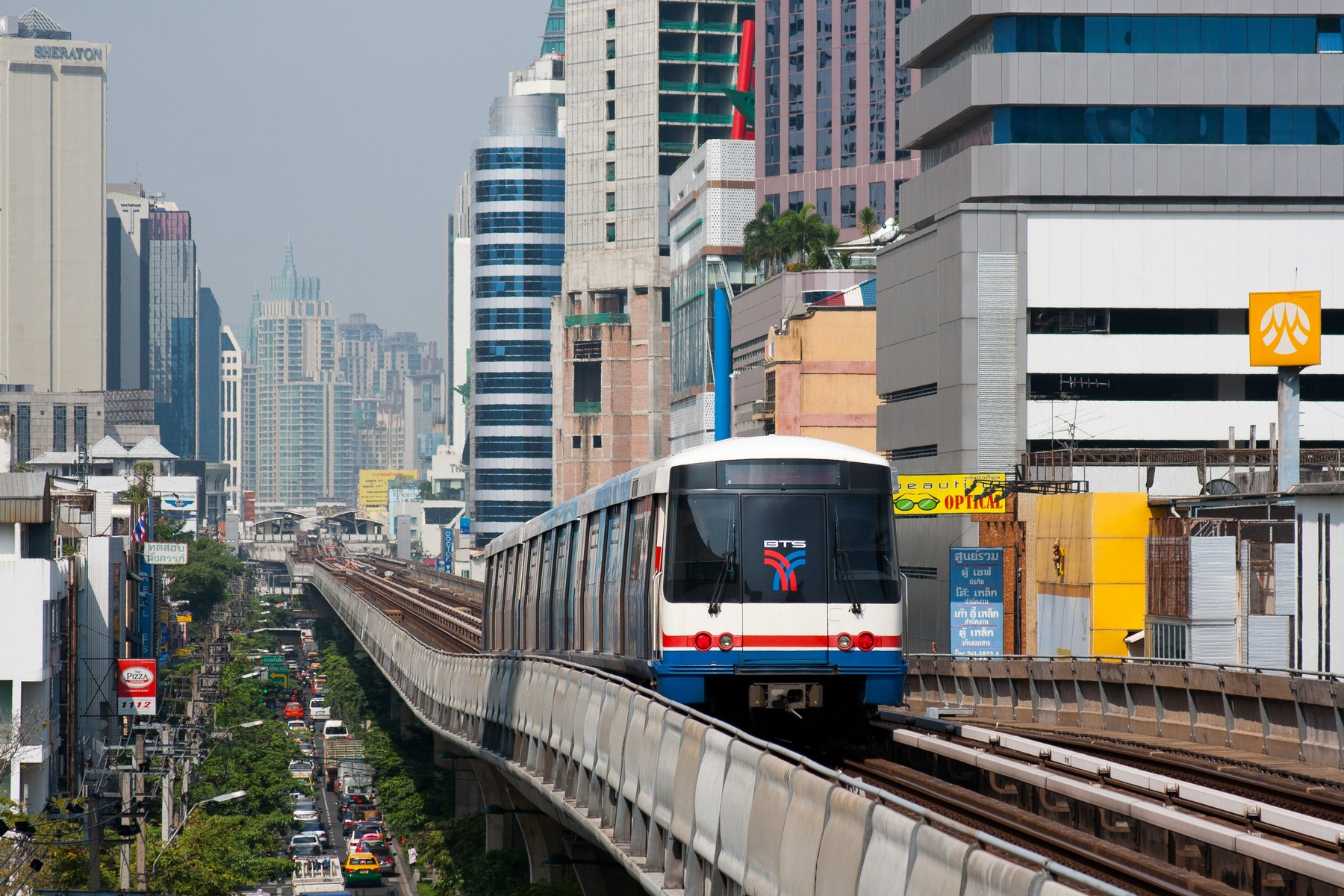
The BTS Skytrain

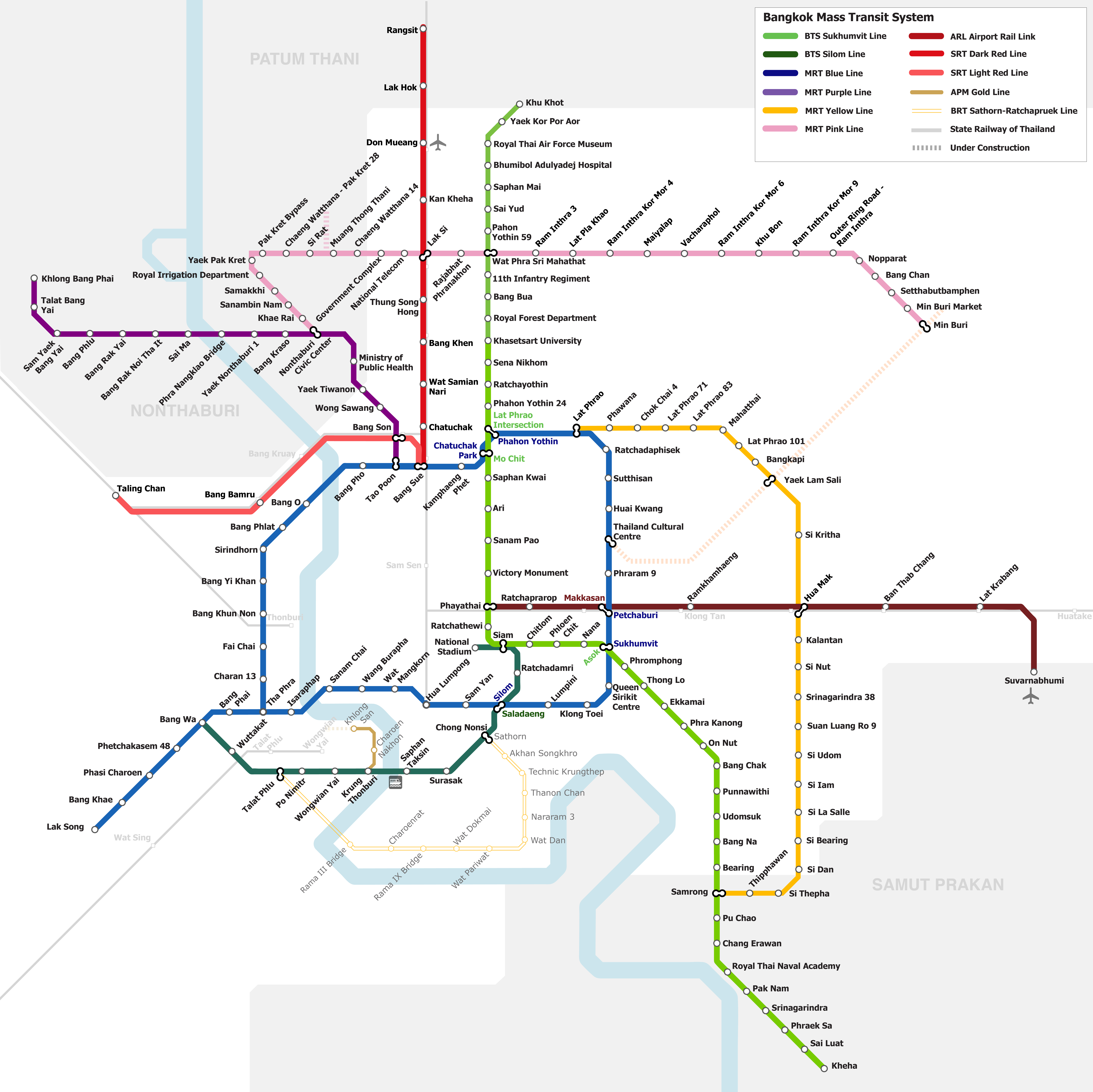
Map of Bangkok urban transit systems

Bangkok Metropolitan Region is served by 10 rapid transit rail lines as of 2025. The BTS Skytrain consists of three lines, the Sukhumvit Line, Silom Line and Gold Line. The Metropolitan Rapid Transit (MRT) also consists of four lines, the Blue Line, Purple Line, Pink Line and Yellow Line. The Light Red Line and Dark Red Line provide commuter rail. Finally, the elevated Airport Rail Link (ARL) links to Suvarnabhumi Airport. Although proposals for the development of rapid transit in Bangkok had been made since 1975, leading to plans for the failed Lavalin Skytrain, it was only in 1999 that the BTS finally began operation.

The rail system reaches into the neighbouring provinces of Nonthaburi, Pathum Thani, Samut Prakan. In future the Dark Red line extension will connect Samut Sakhon.

== Central ==
=== Phitsanulok ===
In Phitsanulok, there is a plan to build a tramway system which has several lines. The project will be modelled on the Sydney tramway network.

== Eastern ==
=== Pattaya ===
Pattaya City had a plan to build a monorail line consisting of ten stations. As of 2018, there has been no progress. In 2020 a new plan called for a 9-kilometre (5.6 mi), 11 station monorail. A 50 million baht feasibility project would be commissioned first. The monorail could open by 2026 with additional lines added in the 2030s. As of 2023, the plan was for a 8.3km line with 13 stops, linking to the Don Mueang–Suvarnabhumi–U-Tapao high-speed railway. As of 2024, the plan was for a 17.37km line of 10 stops, called the Red Line.

== Northern ==
=== Chiang Mai ===
Chiang Mai Municipality has one existing monorail system, Chiang Mai Zoo Monorail, used for excursions within the zoo. Plans for an electric rail system have been discussed for years. In 2018, the plans seem to have gained traction. The Mass Rapid Transit Authority of Thailand (MRTA) announced that the bidding process for a tram network in Chiang Mai could begin in 2020. The 35 km (22 mi) tramway, both above and below ground, is estimated to cost 86 billion baht. It is projected that the first of three lines could break ground in 2021, and the system could be operational by roughly 2027.

== Northeastern ==
=== Khon Kaen ===
In Khon Kaen, there is a plan to build a Light Rail with several lines. In 2016, a 26 kilometer-long light rail line was proposed. The light rail line, which is to be funded by local government and businesses instead of the central government, hopes to begin construction in 2019.

Rapid transit lines in Khon Kaen City Municipality
Line	Proposed opening	Terminal		Length [km]	Length [mile]	Stations	Status
Red Line	2028	Samran	Tha Phra	22.6	14.0	16	Approved
Yellow Line	2028	Ban Thum	Bueng Niam	41	25	23	Planned
Blue Line	2028	VIP Home	Mitr Sampan	22	14	19	Planned
Green Line	2028	Nam Ton	Sila	32	20	25	Planned
Pink Line	2028	Circle route		6	3.7	10	Planned

=== Nakhon Ratchasima ===
Nakhon Ratchasima Municipality has a plan to build five elevated bus rapid transit (or Skybus) lines with the name Korat Rapid Transit. As of 2018, there has been no progress. Later, there is a plan to build a tramway system of several lines. The project will be modelled on the Sydney tramway network.

Rapid transit lines in Nakhon Ratchasima City Municipality
Line	Proposed opening	Terminal		Length [km]	Length [mile]	Stations	Status
Orange Line	????	Pradok Intersection	Khu Muang Kao	9.81	6.10	17	Approved
Green Line	????	Save One Market	Baan Nari Swat Protection and Occupational Development Center	11.17	6.94	18	Approved
Purple Line	????	Save One Market	Baan Nari Swat Protection and Occupational Development Center	11.92	7.41	9	Approved

== Southern ==
=== Hat Yai and Songkhla ===
Hat Yai monorail is a planned 18 kilometer-long elevated monorail consisted of 15 stations. As of 2016, the line is being studied by a university and the government. The design of the stations has been completed. The project will cost approximately 24.4 million baht to construct. It is hoped that construction will begin in 2019.

State Railway of Thailand (SRT) has a plan to build commuter rail linking Hat Yai and Songkhla by reusing a defunct railway line that closed in 1978.

=== Phuket Island ===
The Mass Rapid Transit Authority of Thailand (MRTA) announced in 2018 that bidding to construct a 60 kilometre-long, 23 station tram network in Phuket will commence in 2020. The 39 billion baht tram is part of the government's Private-Public-Partnership (PPP) plan which ensures it will be fast-tracked. The planned route stretches from Takua Thung District in Phang Nga Province to Chalong in Phuket. Phase one will connect Phuket International Airport with Chalong, about 40 kilometres. It will take three years to complete. The project will be modelled on the Sydney tramway network.

== See also ==
- Mass Rapid Transit Master Plan in Bangkok Metropolitan Region
- List of tram and light-rail transit systems
- List of bus rapid transit systems
- List of rapid transit systems
- Phuket Island Light Rail Transit
- Khon Kaen Light Rail Transit
- Suvarnabhumi Airport Automated People Mover
