= List of railway lines in Thailand =

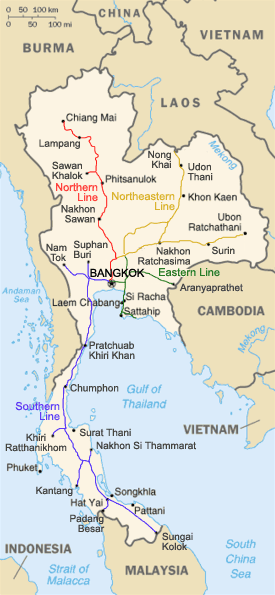
Thailand rail system map

Thailand has 4,431 kilometers of meter-gauge railway tracks not including mass transit lines in Bangkok. All national rail services are managed by the State Railway of Thailand. The four main lines are the Northern Line, which terminates in Chiang Mai; the Northeastern Line, which terminates at Ubon Ratchathani and the Lao border in Nong Khai Province; the Eastern Line, which terminates at the Cambodian border in Sa Kaeo Province;, and the Southern Line, which terminates at the Malaysian border in Yala and Narathiwat Provinces.

== Current lines ==
There are divided into five regional lines:

- Northern Line
- Northeastern Line
- Southern Line
- Eastern Line
- Maeklong Railway

Description	Established	Length	Gauge
Bangkok - Ubon Ratchathani	1930	575 km (357 mi)	Metre gauge
Bangkok - Nong Khai	1958	621 km (386 mi)	Metre gauge
Nong Khai - Thanaleng, Laos	2009	6 km (3.7 mi)	Metre gauge
Kaeng Khoi Junction - Bua Yai Junction	1967	251 km (156 mi)	Metre gauge
Bangkok - Chiang Mai	1926	661 km (411 mi)	Metre gauge
Ban Dara Junction - Sawankhalok	1910	29 km (18 mi)	Metre gauge
Bangkok - Su-ngai Kolok	1921	1,160 km (720 mi)	Metre gauge
Thon Buri - Taling Chan Junction	1903	6 km (3.7 mi)	Metre gauge
Hat Yai Junction - Padang Besar, Malaysia	1918	45 km (28 mi)	Metre gauge
Khao Chum Thong Junction - Nakhon Si Thammarat	1914	35 km (22 mi)	Metre gauge
Thung Song Junction - Kantang	1913	93 km (58 mi)	Metre gauge
Ban Thung Pho Junction - Khiri Rat Nikhom	1956	31 km (19 mi)	Metre gauge
Nong Pladuk Junction - Nam Tok (Burma Railway)	1944	130 km (81 mi)	Metre gauge
Nong Pladuk Junction - Suphan Buri	1963	78 km (48 mi)	Metre gauge
Bangkok - Aranyaprathet	1926	255 km (158 mi)	Metre gauge
Makkasan - Mae Nam	1909	3 km (1.9 mi)	Metre gauge
Sam Sen - Makkasan (Chitlada Triangular Junction)	1936	3 km (1.9 mi)	Metre gauge
Chachoengsao Junction - Ban Phlu Ta Luang	1989	123 km (76 mi)	Metre gauge
Aranyaprathet - Poipet, Cambodia	2019 (reopened)	6 km (3.7 mi)	Meter gauge
Wongwian Yai-Maha Chai (Maeklong Railway)	1904	33 km (21 mi)	Metre gauge
Ban Laem-Maeklong (Maeklong Railway)	1905	33 km (21 mi)	Metre gauge

== Future lines ==
Description	Length	Gauge	Start	Commission
Den Chai-Chiang Rai	325 km (202 mi)	Meter gauge	2014	2017
Ban Phai-Nakhon Phanom	368 km (229 mi)	Meter gauge	2015	2018-2019
Khiri Rat Nikhom-Phuket	300 km (190 mi)	Meter gauge	2016	2019
Chumphon-Satun	??	Meter gauge	??	??
Aranyaprathet–Poipet, Cambodia	6 km (3.7 mi)	Meter gauge	2013(Fixed)	2015
Nam Tok–Thanbyuzayat, Myanmar (Burma Railway)	285 km (177 mi)	Meter gauge	??(Fixed)	2020

== Defunct lines ==
Description	Established	Length	Gauge	Cancelled
Hat Yai–Songkhla	1913	30 km (19 mi)	Meter gauge	1978
Nam Tok–Thanbyuzayat, Myanmar (Burma Railway)	1944	285 km (177 mi)	Meter gauge	??
Bangkok–Samut Prakan (Paknam Railway)	1893	21 km (13 mi)	Narrow gauge	1960
Bang Phlat–Bang Bua Thong (Bang Bua Thong Railway)	1909	??	Narrow gauge	1943
Chumphon–Kraburi (Kra Isthmus Railway)	1943	90 km (56 mi)	Meter gauge	1945
Bung Wai–Ban Pho Mun	1930	7 km (4.3 mi)	Meter gauge	1954
Nong Khai–Talat Nong Khai	1958	2 km (1.2 mi)	Meter gauge	2008
Sungai Golok–Rantau Panjang	1921	3 km (1.9 mi)	Meter gauge	??
Wongwian Yai–Pak Khlong San	1904	??	Meter gauge	1961
Ban Phlu Ta Luang–Sattahip Port	1989	11 km (6.8 mi)	Meter gauge	??
Tha Ruea–Phra Phutthabat (Phra Phutthabat Railway)	1902	20 km (12 mi)	Narrow gauge	1942 or 1947
Phetchaburi–Bang Thalu (Chao Samran beach Railway)	??	??	Narrow gauge	??
Hua Wai–Tha Tako	1940	53 km (33 mi)	Meter gauge	1967

== See also ==
- State Railway of Thailand
- Rail transport in Thailand
- Transport in Thailand
- Burma Railway also known as Death Railway, Thailand–Burma Railway
