= Chiang Mai light rail transit =

Planned light rail system in Thailand

Overview
- Locale: Chiang Mai, Thailand
- Transit type: Light rail
- Number of lines: 3

Operation
- Operation will start: 2032

Technical
- System length: 35 km (21.7 mi)
- Track gauge: 1,435 mm (4 ft 8 1/2 in) standard gauge

The Thai city of Chiang Mai is planning a light rail system, with an aimed 2032 opening. The Mass Rapid Transit Authority of Thailand (MRTA) announced that the bidding process for a tram network in Chiang Mai could begin in 2020. The 35 km tramway, both above and below ground, is estimated to cost 86 billion baht. It was previously projected that the first of three lines could break ground in 2021, and the system could be operational by roughly 2027.

As of 2026, groundbreaking is expected to begin in 2028, with the system operational by December 2032.

== Lines ==
Three lines are planned, with a total length of approximately 35 km (21.7 mi), of which around 24 km (14.9 mi) will be underground.

=== Red Line ===
The first line to be built, the Red Line, will be 12.54 kilometres (7.79 mi), with 5.17 kilometres (3.21 mi) at grade and 7.37 kilometres (4.58 mi) underground, running from north to south and encompassing the western side of the city.

Code	Station Name		Transfers	Location	
Code	English	Thai	Transfers	Subdistrict	District
x	Nakornping Hospital	โรงพยาบาลนครพิงค์		Don Kaeo	Mae Rim
x	700th Anniversary Stadium	สนามกีฬาสมโภช 700 ปี		Don Kaeo	Mae Rim
x	International Exhibition and Convention Centre	ศูนย์ประชุมและแสดงสินค้านานาชาติ		Chang Phueak	Mueang Chiang Mai
x	Chiang Mai Rajabhat University	มหาวิทยาลัยราชภัฏเชียงใหม่		Chang Phueak	Mueang Chiang Mai
x	Chang Phueak Bus Terminal	สถานีขนส่งช้างเผือก		Si Phum	Mueang Chiang Mai
x	Chiangmai Ram Hospital	โรงพยาบาลเชียงใหม่ ราม		Si Phum	Mueang Chiang Mai
x	Maharaj Nakorn Chiang Mai Hospital	โรงพยาบาลมหาราชนครเชียงใหม่		Si Phum	Mueang Chiang Mai
x	Wattanothai Payap School	โรงเรียนวัฒโนทัยพายัพ		Haiya	Mueang Chiang Mai
x	Far Eastern University	มหาวิทยาลัยฟาร์อีสเทอร์น		Haiya	Mueang Chiang Mai
x	Chiang Mai International Airport	ท่าอากาศยานเชียงใหม่		Suthep	Mueang Chiang Mai
x	Department of Land Transport Chiang Mai	สำนักงานขนส่งจังหวัดเชียงใหม่		Mae Hia	Mueang Chiang Mai
x	Big C Supercenter Hang Dong	ห้างสรรพสินค้าบิ๊กซีหางดง		Mae Hia	Mueang Chiang Mai

=== Blue Line ===
The 11.92 km (7.4 mi) Blue Line will run from Chiang Mai Zoo in the west of the municipality to Don Chan district in the south. 3.15 kilometres (1.96 mi) will be at-grade and 8.77 kilometres (5.45 mi) will be underground.

=== Green Line ===
The 10.47 km (6.5 mi) Green Line will run from the city's northeast area and head southward to Chiang Mai airport. 2.55 kilometres (1.58 mi) will be at-grade and 7.92 kilometres (4.92 mi) will be underground.

== See also ==
- Phuket Island light rail transit
- Khon Kaen Light Rail Transit
- List of urban rail systems in Thailand
