= High-speed rail in Thailand =

Thailand high-speed rail
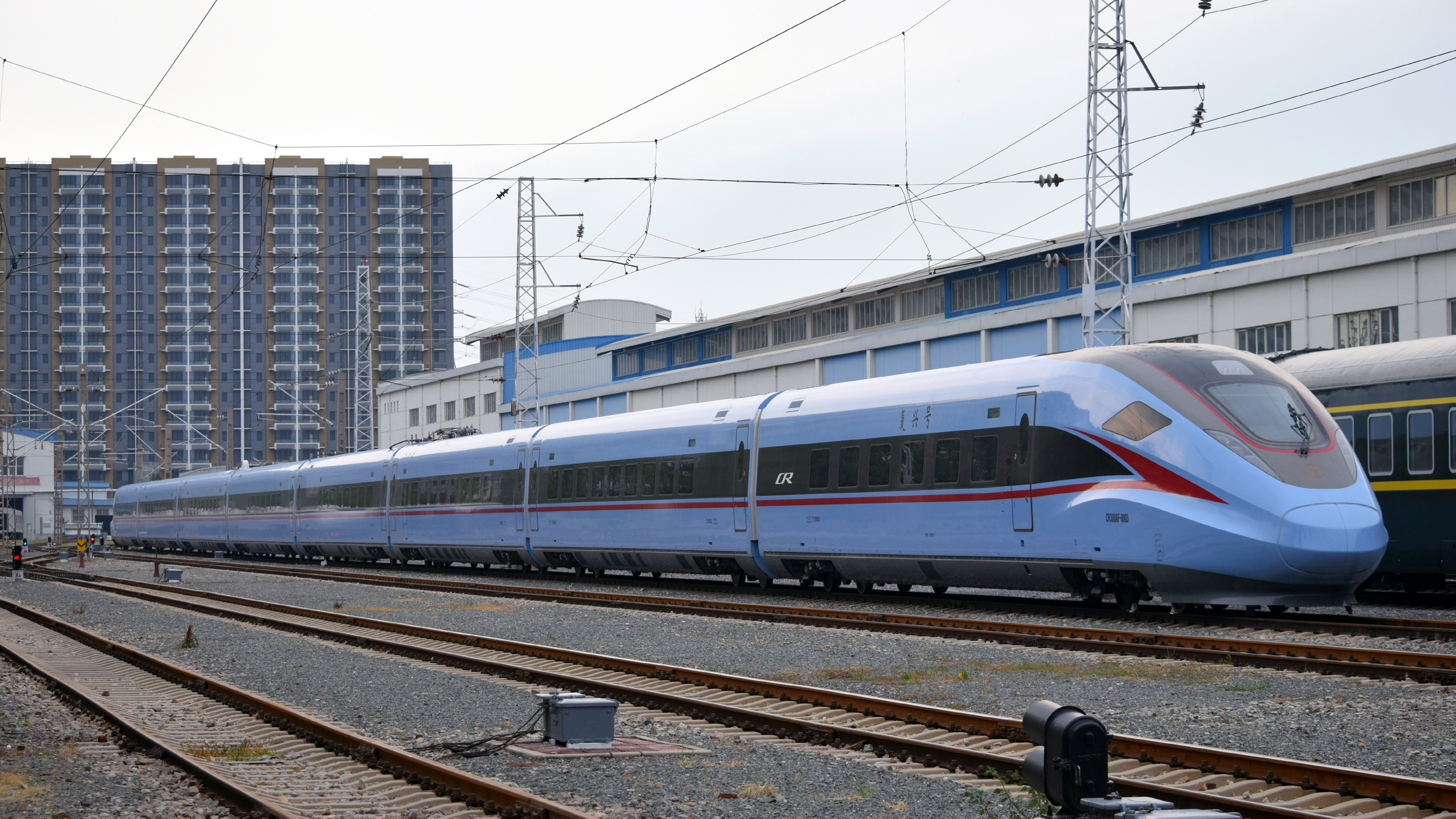
- CRRC Fuxing Series EMU proposed for Northeastern high-speed rail line passenger services.

Overview
- Status: Under construction
- Locale: Thailand

Service
- Type: High-speed rail
- Operator: State Railway of Thailand
- Rolling stock: CR300AF (Delivery is planned for late 2024)

Technical
- Track gauge: 1,435 mm (4 ft 8 1/2 in) standard gauge
- Operating speed: 300 km/h (186 mph) (Design); 250 km/h (155 mph) (Operational)

Although Thailand has no operational high-speed rail lines, the country is planning a large high-speed rail network connecting its major cities. The first line of the network is under construction from Bangkok to Nakhon Ratchasima, with a planned maximum operational speed of 250 km/h (155 mph).

== History ==
Proposals for high-speed rail in Thailand had existed from as early as February 1996, with three lines out of Bangkok to Chiang Mai, Hat Yai and Nong Khai, but these were shelved in the wake of the 1997 Asian financial crisis.

In October 2010, the Thai Parliament approved initial proposals for a high-speed rail (HSR) network. Five lines capable of handling 250 km/h (155 mph) speeds would radiate from Bangkok.

In March 2013, the transport minister revealed that only one company would be selected to run all high-speed train routes, scheduled to be operational between 2018 and 2019. The first 86 km (53 mi) section from Krung Thep Aphiwat to Ayuthaya was planned to be tendered in late 2013. However, a seven-month political crisis involving the dissolution of parliament and an annulled February 2014 election culminated in a military coup in May 2014. In July 2014, the new military junta deferred all HSR plans until a civilian government is installed.

Following the military coup of May 2014 and his elevation to the office of prime minister, Gen Prayut Chan-o-cha proposed connecting Bangkok to two popular resort cities, Pattaya and Hua Hin, by high-speed rail. The Transport Ministry's Office of Transport and Traffic Policy and Planning had earlier conducted studies on both routes. They assumed that, for the Bangkok-Pattaya line, trains would run through Chachoengsao, Chonburi, and Pattaya, terminating in Rayong, a distance of 194 km (121 mi). Construction costs were estimated at 152 billion baht with an economic internal rate of return (EIRR) of 13%. Construction would take about 54 months. The route to Hua Hin would be 209 km (130 mi) in length with an investment cost of about 98 billion baht and an EIRR of 8.1%. The office concluded that these routes would be of little interest to private investors due to the high investment required coupled with a low rate of return. Four HSR lines were included in the 2017 fiscal year plans.

== Proposed high-speed routes ==
A map depicting the planned high speed rail lines of Thailand as of 2022.

No.	High-speed corridor	Route	Operation speed	Length	Funding model	Cost	Projected operation	Status
1	Northeastern HSR Phase 1	Krung Thep Aphiwat–Don Mueang–Ayutthaya–Saraburi–Pak Chong–Nakhon Ratchasima	160–250 km/h (99–155 mph)	250.8 km (155.8 mi)	PPP Net Cost	179,412.21 million baht (US$5,986 million)	"could be in service by 2028"	As of March 2026, the project is under construction. Civil engineering works are 53.19% complete.
2	Eastern HSR Phase 1	Don Mueang–Krung Thep Aphiwat–Makkasan–Suvarnabhumi Airport–Chachoengsao–Chonburi–Si Racha–Pattaya–U-Tapao	250 km/h (160 mph)	220 km (140 mi)	PPP Net Cost	224,544 million baht (US$7,492 million)	TBA	As of July 2026, there are "difficulties in securing bank loans". Earlier (and as of February 2026), the project has been approved, but construction is yet to begin.
3	Northeastern HSR Phase 2	Nakhon Ratchasima–Bua Yai–Ban Phai–Khon Kaen–Udon Thani–Nong Khai	250 km/h (160 mph)	356.01 km (221.21 mi)	PPP Net Cost	341,351.42 million baht (US$10.000 million)	TBA	As of February 2026, phase 2 of the project has been approved by the cabinet and is under construction
4	Eastern HSR Phase 2	U-Tapao–Rayong–Klaeng–Chanthaburi–Trat	250 km/h (160 mph)	190 km (120 mi)	PPP Net Cost	159,111 million baht (US$5,309 million)	TBA	Planning stage
5	Northern HSR Phase 1	Krung Thep Aphiwat–Don Mueang–Ayutthaya–Lopburi–Nakhon Sawan–Phichit–Phitsanulok	300 km/h (190 mph)	380 km (240 mi)	Japan	212,892 million baht (US$7,103 million)	TBA	Planning stage
6	Southern HSR Phase 1	Krung Thep Aphiwat–Nakhon Pathom–Ratchaburi–Phetchaburi–Hua Hin	300 km/h (190 mph)	211 km (131 mi)	PPP Net Cost	100,125 million baht (US$3,341 million)	TBA	Planning stage
7	Northern HSR Phase 2	Phitsanulok–Sukhothai–Si Satchanalai–Lampang–Lamphun–Chiang Mai	300 km/h (190 mph)	288 km (179 mi)	Japan	232,411 million baht (US$7,755 million)	TBA	Planning stage
8	Southern HSR Phase 2	Hua Hin–Prachuap Khiri Khan–Chumphon–Surat Thani–Nakhon Si Thammarat–Phatthalung–Hat Yai–Padang Besar	300 km/h (190 mph)	759 km (472 mi)	PPP Net Cost	432,329 million baht (US$14,425 million)	TBA	Planning stage

=== Northeastern HSR: Bangkok–Nakhon Ratchasima–Nong Khai (Sino-Thai railway project) ===
Northeastern HSR route map

In November 2014, Thailand and China signed a memorandum of understanding agreeing to construct the Thai portion of the transnational railway running from Kunming, China to the Gulf of Thailand. In November 2015, both parties agreed to a division of labour. Under the framework, a joint venture would be set up to run the project. China would conduct feasibility studies, design the system, construct tunnels and bridges, and lay track. The MoU stipulates that Thailand is responsible for 100% investment in the project and operates the construction itself, including conducting social and environmental impact studies, expropriating land for construction, handling general civil engineering and power supply, and supplying construction materials.

Once built, China will operate and maintain the system for the first three years of operation. Between the third and the seventh years, both countries would share responsibility. Later, Thailand would take on responsibility with China acting as an adviser. China would train Thai personnel to operate and maintain the system.

Dual standard-gauge tracks would be laid throughout the project. In Thailand, two routes would diverge at a junction in Kaeng Khoi District in Saraburi Province. One to connect Bangkok to Kaeng Khoi. The other route to connect Kaeng Khoi with Map Ta Phut of Rayong Province. From Kaeng Khoi tracks would lead north to Nakhon Ratchasima and on to Nong Khai Province. Construction would be divided into four sections: Bangkok–Kaeng Khoi, Map Ta Phut–Kaeng Khoi, Kaeng Khoi–Nakhon Ratchasima, and Nakhon Ratchasima–Nong Khai.

Construction of Thailand's 873-kilometre-long portion of the railway system started in December 2017 The railway will connect to the 417 km Boten–Vientiane railway and a 520 km line from the Lao border to Kunming. In July 2021, authorities said: "works which will have to be postponed are the [... tracks] between Nawa Nakhon and Ban Pho, between Phra Kaeo and Saraburi"; furthermore another postponement, "presumably until [... 2022 is] the section between Don Muang and Nawa Nakhon". As of Q4 2022, the "first phase between Bangkok and Nakhon Ratchasima is [...] behind schedule"; furthermore, it's "15% completed when it should have been 37%"; the Phase 1 line was due to be completed in 2026 - however, media says that the main contract will have to be extended, according to a source at the Transport Ministry.

=== Eastern HSR: Bangkok–U-Tapao Airport ===
A HSR line to the eastern seaboard was first proposed in 1996 but there was no progress for over a decade. In 2009, the government requested the Office of Transport and Traffic Policy and Planning (OTP) to create a plan for a new HSR network in Thailand that included an eastern HSR line to Rayong. The route was finalised before the 2011 election with the promise to begin construction the next year if the government was re-elected, but they lost the election. After the 2011 election, the new government reviewed all HSR plans and the SRT stated that the line would be tendered in early 2014. After the May 2014 coup there were further delays while the military government reviewed all HSR lines, initially deferring all projects. In early 2016, the government agreed to proceed with the eastern HSR route and suggested that it could be extended to Don Mueang International Airport beyond the terminus at Krung Thep Aphiwat Central Terminal thus providing a link with three airports. Extending the line would provide a link between Don Mueang Airport, Suvarnabhumi Airport, and U-Tapao International Airport in Ban Chang District.

During 2017, OTP and the Ministry of Transport in consultation with the SRT agreed that extending the line to terminate at Don Mueang would effectively include the long-delayed extension of the Airport Rail Link (Bangkok) from Makkasan Station to Don Mueang Airport as part of the project. The Eastern Economic Corridor Office (EEC Office) in October 2017 finalised previous OTP plans to build the 10-station Eastern HSR line linking Don Mueang airport, Krung Thep Aphiwat, Makkasan, Suvarnabhumi Airport, Chonburi, Si Racha, Pattaya, U-Tapao Airport, and Rayong. In early 2018, the section to Rayong was excluded due to environmental and safety concerns and it was decided that the line would terminate at U-Tapao Airport.

The SRT stated that the first tenders for the Eastern HSR line are expected to be tendered by May 2018 with a four-month auction period before the contract is awarded. The cost of the project was estimated to be over 200 billion baht, of which the Thai Government would fund 123 billion baht and the private sector estimated to contribute 90 billion baht.

Two rival consortia vied for the airport link contract. The Charoen Pokphand (CP) Group-led consortium consisting of Italian-Thai Development, China Railway Construction Corporation Ltd, CH. Karnchang, and Bangkok Expressway and Metro, won the project with a 224 billion baht bid in December 2018. Their winning bid is valid until 8 November 2019. Until 16 October 2019, the consortium had refused to sign the contract, citing land expropriation and eviction problems and the consortium's request that the government share the risk in the project. Negotiations were further complicated by the resignation of the entire board of the State Railway. On 16 October 2019, news reports announced that the CP consortium intends to sign the rail deal on 25 October. Tanit Sorat, vice-chairman of the Employers' Confederation of Thai Trade and Industry, said that the contract signing delays are, "...unlikely to affect the project because the government will carry out the project smoothly." The project was eventually approved in October 2019 as a public private partnership between the Thai government and Charoen Pokphand/China Railway Construction Corporation. The assets will revert to state ownership after 50 years. It is scheduled to start construction in 2023 and open for service in 2029.

=== Northern HSR: Bangkok–Phitsanulok–Chiang Mai (Japanese-Thai project) ===
Japan would provide Shinkansen technology for a high-speed rail link between Bangkok and the northern city of Chiang Mai. Phase 1 would connect Bangkok to Phitsanulok. It is estimated to cost 280 billion baht. Seven stations are planned for this segment: Krung Thep Aphiwat, Don Mueang, Ayutthaya, Lopburi, Nakhon Sawan, Phichit, and Phitsanulok. To reduce costs, Thai authorities have proposed reducing the number of stations, but the Japan International Cooperation Agency (JICA) has rejected this suggestion on the grounds that it defeats the original purpose of the project. This portion of the route was scheduled to be submitted to the Thai cabinet for financial approval in August 2018.

After an initial cooperation agreement was signed in 2015, the Thai government formally requested the technical and financial assistance of the Japanese government in late 2016 for the building of the Northern HSR line to Chiang Mai. The Japanese completed a feasibility study which estimated that the project will cost 420 billion baht to build.

A feasibility study by JICA in mid-2018 reported that the train as planned would run at a loss. JICA's study projects only 10,000 passengers per day on the route, as opposed to the 30,000 per day forecasted in the original planning proposals. To be profitable from ticket sales would require 50,000 fares per day.

The Thai government announced in September 2019 that it may cancel Bangkok-Chiang Mai high-speed rail project after private investors declined to invest. The cost of the 670 kilometre line is estimated to be 400 billion baht. Japan has turned down the project as a bad investment due to low passenger projections. However Ministry of Transport denies that Japan cancelled the project.

On 14 December 2022, the Department of Railways is discussing with MLIT-JICA to speed up the conclusion of economic and financial feasibility studies for the high-speed rail between Bangkok and Chiang Mai, to be completed in March 2023. Additionally, the department has asked for a study of the economic return from the development of the area around the station. On March 8, 2023, the economic and financial feasibility study for the high-speed rail project from Bangkok to Chiang Mai, Phase 1 from Bangkok to Phitsanulok, was completed. The study included an analysis of direct and indirect benefits and found that the project is worth the investment. The economic return (EIRR) is 17.3 percent, which is 12 percent higher than the threshold, and the net present value (NPV) is positive over the period of operation.

=== Southern HSR: Bangkok–Hua Hin ===
This line would link Bangkok with Hua Hin. It would be 211 km (131 mi), and estimated costs in 2016 were 152 billion baht. The extension have also plans to link with Malaysia which was proposed on September 28, 2021.

== See also ==
- Rail transport in Thailand
- Kunming–Singapore railway
