= Phuket Island light rail transit =

Phuket Island Light Rail Transit

Overview
- Owner: MRTA
- Locale: Phuket and Phang Nga, Thailand
- Transit type: Light rail transit
- Number of lines: 1
- Number of stations: 24 (Phase 1: 21)
- Website: Phuket Light Rail Transit

Operation
- Operation will start: December 2031

Technical
- System length: 58.6 km (36.4 mi)
- Track gauge: 1,435 mm (4 ft 8 1/2 in)

The Phuket Island Light Rail Transit project is a long proposed 58.6-kilometre (36.4 mi) MRTA light rail transit system for Phuket and Phang Nga provinces in Thailand first initiated in 2005. The line would consist of 24 stations running from Takua Thung District in Phang Nga Province to Phuket City and terminating at Chalong intersection. The line would have at-grade and elevated sections. The cost of the project was estimated at 35 billion baht (approximately US$1.1 billion) in 2019.

Phase one would connect Phuket International Airport to Chalong with 21 stations and be 41.7 kilometres (25.9 mi) long. The second phase would extend the line 16.8 km (10.4 mi) north from Thalang station to Takua Thung District in order to connect with a proposed Surat Thani-Phang Nga Province SRT intercity railway line.

== Route Alignment ==
Proposed route for the Phuket Island light rail transit as of 2026.

The LRT line will run along a north-south axis of Phuket Island. The planned route stretches for 58.6 km (36.4 mi) from Takua Thung in Phang Nga Province to Chalong via Phuket town. Phase one will connect Phuket International Airport with Chalong. It will consist of 21 stations and be 41.7km long.

The second phase will run for a distance of 16.8 km (10.4 mi) from Thalang (S02) north across the Phuket bridge to Takua Thung District and have three stations.

== History ==
The original plan for mass transit on Phuket Island was first proposed in 2005. However, it was not until 2010 that the Phuket governor proposed a heavy rail metro idea as a requirement for the island to meet increasing tourism and local transport demands. By mid-2014, the project had evolved into a planned light rail line of nearly 60 km in length running from the north of the island to the south. The Ministry of Transport approved the project in principle in November 2015 at an estimated cost of 23.5 billion baht. Public meetings were held in February 2017 seeking feedback and comments from the public into the project.

In April 2017, it was announced that the MRTA had approved the Ministry of Transport's Office of Transport and Traffic Policy and Planning (OTP) design of the project with a view to seeking cabinet approval in 2018. Cabinet approval was granted on 11 September 2018.

The project was planned to be tendered in late 2019, with construction starting in 2020 for a scheduled 2024 opening of Phase 1. However, in August 2020, during a public meeting in Phuket town, the MRTA Assistant Governor Sarot Torsuwan stated that the project would be tendered as a PPP (Public–Private Partnership) project in 2022. The change to a PPP tender process would require a new study by the MRTA and a new EIA, with the Cabinet expected to consider the study in October 2021.

In mid May 2021, the Transport Minister ordered the MRTA to consider an automatic BRT style line with a view to reduce the total project cost by just over 15 billion baht. Additionally, the Minister suggested delaying the project until 2030 to minimise overall traffic disruption on Phuket due to the planned construction of the Patong Tunnel which is due to be completed by 2028.

== Planning Progress ==
Contracts for project investment studies were signed at the end of July 2018 and were completed by the end of 2018. They were considered by the MRTA board for approval by in early 2019 and then reviewed by the Transport Ministry. Phuket provincial authorities have reportedly been in discussions with both Siemens and Bombardier regarding the project.

OTP Deputy Director Wilairat Sirisoponsil, stated that the Phuket light rail project design was complete, and has been added into the PPP (Public–Private Partnership) Fast Track. However, detailed design issues have arisen with the Department of Highways opposed to some sections of the project and concerns regarding any impact on road lanes. However, the design changes may increase the overall budget by 2 billion baht according to the MRTA. The line is projected to serve up to 70,000 passengers per day, passing by 40 schools and business districts en route. Fares are expected to cost from 15 to 25 baht. Some critics have cited officials who say that fares will top out at 100–137 baht.

The project was planned to be tendered in late 2019 with construction starting in 2020 for a scheduled 2024 opening of Phase 1. However, in August 2020 during a public meeting in Phuket town the MRTA Assistant Governor Sarot Torsuwan stated that the project would be delayed and tendered as a PPP project in 2022. Subsequently in mid May 2021, the Transport Minister ordered the MRTA to consider an automatic BRT style line with a view to reduce the total project cost by just over 15 billion baht.

At a public consultation meeting held in Phuket town on 12 November 2021, the MRTA Assistant Governor stated that the two options of a BRT style service or the preferred option of a light rail were still being evaluated and that it was possible for construction to begin in 2023 ready with the line ready for service in 2026.

In 14 July 2025, it was acknowledged by the MRTA Board of Directors that the line will be scheduled to start construction on September 2028 and be operational by December 2031

== See also ==
- Chiang Mai light rail transit
- Khon Kaen Light Rail Transit
- List of urban rail systems in Thailand
