= Khon Kaen Light Rail Transit =

Light rail project in Khon Kaen, Thailand

Khon Kaen Light Rail Transit (LRT) รถไฟฟ้ารางเบาขอนแก่น

Overview
- Owner: Khon Kaen City Development co., ltd
- Locale: Khon Kaen, Thailand
- Transit type: Light rail transit
- Number of lines: 1
- Number of stations: 21
- Headquarters: Khon Kaen, Thailand
- Website: Khonkaenthinktank

Technical
- System length: 26 km (16 mi)
- Track gauge: 1,435 mm (4 ft 8 1/2 in)

The Khon Kaen Light Rail Transit Project is a planned 22.6-kilometre (14.0 mi) light rail transit system consisting of an initial 16 stations to serve Khon Kaen Province in north-east Thailand. A Phase 2 3.5-kilometre (2.2 mi) five-station extension is also planned. The line will have both at-grade and elevated sections. Fares are expected to be a flat 15 baht. As of 2025, construction has yet to start, due to ongoing issues with funding and land acquisition.

== History ==
The original plan for mass transit in Khon Kaen consisted of a four line Bus Rapid Transit (BRT) network which was proposed in 2012. By 2014, a master plan for the BRT network had been finalised.

However, in early 2015, Khon Kaen Mayor proposed converting the long North-South Red BRT line into a light rail line as part of Khon Kaen's Smart City development program and to integrate with the future planned North East high speed rail to Nong Khai. By mid 2015, a feasibility study was commissioned for a light rail line. In mid March 2016, the Thai government signed a decree approving the project and provided a budget to complete the feasibility study and design of the project. In March 2017, the Khon Kaen Mayor announced that a private company, Khon Kaen Transit System Co., owned by Khon Kaen City and 4 surrounding municipalities would be established to operate the line.

In July 2017, it was announced that the tender for the project was to be issued and awarded by the end of 2017. However, this did not occur as the feasibility study by Office of Transport and Traffic Policy and Planning (OTP) evaluating the design and operations had not been completed. The OTP study was completed in February 2018 and the project was formally approved by the government in October 2018.

As of December 2018, bidding on the project is scheduled to commence no later than February 2019, with construction beginning immediately after the process concludes within next year.

In November 2021 the Khon Kaen Transit System Co signed an MOA with CRRC to form a joint venture for construction.

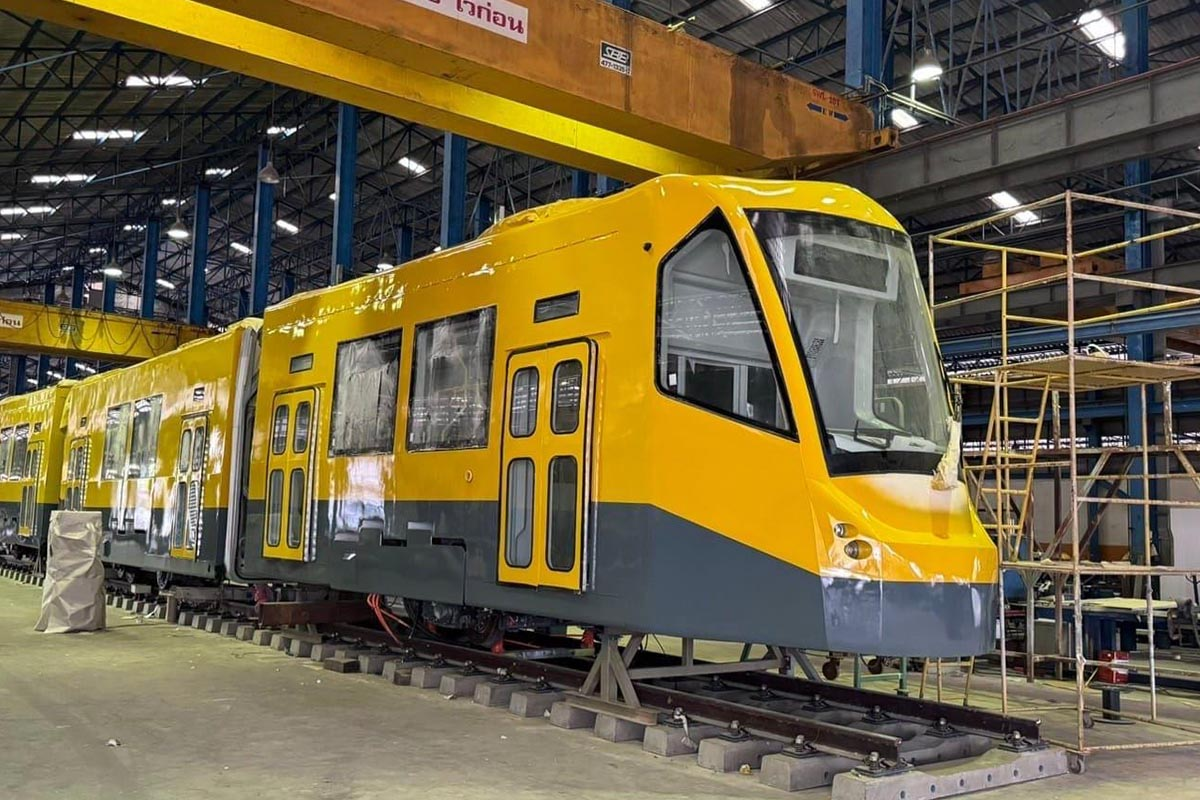
Prototype Tram built by Rajamangala University of Technology Isan.

== Lines ==
Line	Terminal		Length [km]	Length [mile]	Stations	Status
Red Line	Samran	Tha Phra	22.6	14.0	16	Approved
Yellow Line	Ban Thum	Bueng Niam	41	25	23	Planned
Blue Line	VIP Home	Mitr Sampan	22	14	19	Planned
Green Line	Nam Ton	Sila	32	20	25	Planned
Pink Line	Circle route		6	3.7	10	Planned

== Alignment ==
The LRT line runs on a north-south axis along Mittraphap Road through the center of Khon Kaen city.

== See also ==
- List of urban rail systems in Thailand
- Phuket Island Light Rail Transit
