= Driving licence in Thailand =

Thai Driving License ใบอนุญาตขับรถ
- Sample of the probationary or temporary driving licence
- Type: Driving licence
- Issued by: Thailand Department of Land Transport
- Purpose: To demonstrate that the holder is permitted to drive in Thailand.
- Eligibility: Car: 18 years old Motorcycle: 15 years old
- Expiration: Private: 5 years Public or large vehicles: 3 years
- Cost: ฿100 or ฿50 per year, plus ฿5 or ฿50 according to the licence type.

Driving licence in Thailand is a document that allows the holder to drive on any roads in the Kingdom of Thailand. The minimum age to drive a motor vehicle is 18, and to drive a motorcycle is 15. Driving licence is issued and administered by the Department of Land Transport, Ministry of Transport and its branches, land transport offices across Thailand.

All drivers must pass the driving test and obtain a probationary driving licence. Once the licence has been held for at least a year, the driver can convert it into a full public or private licence according to their choice. They can also apply for licences for heavy goods or passenger vehicles. Drivers who previously had their licence revoked, usually by a court order, must also obtain a probationary licence.

Due to the introduction of very powerful and heavy motorcycles, the Department of Land Transport is introducing a new regulation. Once the regulation is effective, drivers who want to drive a motorcycle with the power exceeding 45 kW or the engine larger than 400 cc must have an additional licence as well as more stringent training. As of 2026, the specialized licence is not available.

== Types of Driving Licence ==
=== Civil Driving Licence ===
Driving licence in Thailand is issued under two different laws: (1) Automobile Act, 1979 for small cars and motorcycle; (2) Land Transport Act, 1979 for heavy good and passenger vehicles. In accordance with the Automobile Act of 1979, driving licences may be classified as follows:

Driving Licences according to the Automobile Act, 1979
Category	Validity (years)	Vehicle Type	Notes
Temporary or Probationary Licence	2	Car	This is the first licence that allows the holder to drive independently according to the vehicle specified by the licence. The validity is two years. There are some restrictions, including the inability to obtain an International Driving Permit and lower alcohol threshold.
Temporary or Probationary Licence	2	Tricycle	This is the first licence that allows the holder to drive independently according to the vehicle specified by the licence. The validity is two years. There are some restrictions, including the inability to obtain an International Driving Permit and lower alcohol threshold.
Temporary or Probationary Licence	2	Motorcycle	This is the first licence that allows the holder to drive independently according to the vehicle specified by the licence. The validity is two years. There are some restrictions, including the inability to obtain an International Driving Permit and lower alcohol threshold.
Private Licence	5	Car	Once the probationary licence has been held for 2 years, the holder may apply for the full licence of the same vehicle type. This licence is valid for five years from the upgrade or renewal date. If the licence is due to expire before the next birthdate, the actual expiry date will be amended to be the next birthdate. No matter how long since the first upgrade, the licence always show the same issuance date. The only difference is the expiry date.
Private Licence	5	Tricycle	Once the probationary licence has been held for 2 years, the holder may apply for the full licence of the same vehicle type. This licence is valid for five years from the upgrade or renewal date. If the licence is due to expire before the next birthdate, the actual expiry date will be amended to be the next birthdate. No matter how long since the first upgrade, the licence always show the same issuance date. The only difference is the expiry date.
Private Licence	5	Motorcycle	Once the probationary licence has been held for 2 years, the holder may apply for the full licence of the same vehicle type. This licence is valid for five years from the upgrade or renewal date. If the licence is due to expire before the next birthdate, the actual expiry date will be amended to be the next birthdate. No matter how long since the first upgrade, the licence always show the same issuance date. The only difference is the expiry date.
Public (or Taxicab) Licence	3	Car	Like a private licence, a public licence may be obtained by anyone who wants to drive a taxicab. The applicant must pass a Criminal record test by demonstrating that they have never committed serious crimes, or they completed their sentences for at least 3 years before the application date. This licence is valid for three years. The condition on expiry date as a private licence still applies. Note that professional driving and certain labour-intensive jobs, including riding a tricycle and pusing a cart, are restricted to Thai nationals..
Public (or Taxicab) Licence	3	Tricycle	
Public (or Taxicab) Licence	3	Motorcycle	
Road Roller Licence	5		Restricted to road rollers, both single and trailed.
Tractor Licence	5		Restricted to tractors.
Other Licences	5		For example, agricultural vehicles.

All drivers must begin by obtaining a probationary licence. Once the licence has been held for at least 2 years and they are at least 18 years old, they can apply for a full licence. Either public or private licence are available according to their choice. A private licence does not require a criminal record check, while a public licence requires one. Anyone who has completed a sentence of imprisonment and who has been discharged for at least three years shall be considered fit for a public driving licence. A private driving licence is valid for 5 years, while a public driving licence can be used for 3 years.

The minimum age for obtaining a probationary licence is 18 years old. The exception is that a probationary motorcycle licence may be issued to people aged 15–17 years old (inclusive). For a full licence, however, the applicants must be at least 18 years old. This means the driver who obtained their probationary motorcycle licence when they are 15 must obtain the same licence again when they are 17.

Learner drivers do not need a learner's permit or similar documents, but must be accompanied by a qualified driver who has held a full licence for at least three years.

The Land Transport Act, 1979, defined different licences to be issued. These include:

Driving Licences according to the Land Transport Act, 1979
Class	Minimum age (years)	Description
Class 1 (A1 or P1)	A1: 22; P1: 18	This licence is for a good vehicle with the combined weight of up to 3,500 kg, or a passenger carrying vehicle with 20 or less passengers. The vehicle must not trail another vehicle. For example, minibus and van.
Class 2 (A2 or P2)	A2: 22; P2: 20	Like Class 1, but the combined weight and the passenger number is unlimited. For example, bus and coach.
Class 3 (A3 or P3)	A3: 22; P3: 20	This licence covers everything in Class 2 and trailers.
Class 4 (A4 or P4)	A4: 25; P4: 25	This licence covers everything in Class 3 and vehicles carrying dangerous goods.

The prefix A and P stands for "all types" and "personal only" respectively. The licence of the higher category can be used in place of the lower ones. The "all types" or A licences can be used instead of the "personal only" or P licences. For instance, an A4 (ท.4) licence can be used in lieu of P4 (บ.4), A3 (ท.3), P3 (บ.3), A2 (ท.2), P2 (บ.2), A1 (ท.1) licences. An A2 licence can be used in place of P2, A1 and P1 licences.

Drivers who wish to obtain P1-P4 licences must meet the minimum age requirements as well as pass an approved course at the local transport office or approved driving school. In addition, A1-A4 licences also require a criminal record check.

The probationary car licence is, according to the legislation, not needed for P/A 1-4 licences. In practice, most drivers learning to drive large vehicles must already learnt how to drive smaller vehicles, requiring the probationary car licence. Some driving schools and land transport offices often require the probationary car licence before the driver can learn to drive a large truck.

=== Military Driving Licence ===
Military personnel can apply for a civil driving licence and use it in their career. However, the Military Automobile Act, 1933 empowered the Department of Army Transportation to issue driving licences to members of armed forces. These include:

Military Driving Licences
Class	Vehicle Type	Equivalent Civil Licence
M1	Tracked vehicle	A3 and P3
M2	Car or tricycle with the combined weight exceeding 2 tonnes	A2 and P2
M3	Car or tricycle with the combined weight of up to 2 tonnes	A1, P1 and Car licence
M4	Tricycle with a sidecar	Tricycle licence
M5	Trailed motorcycle	Not available
M6	All types	A3 and P3

== Issuance of the Driving Licence ==
Thailand utilises a probationary or temporary licence for new and previously disqualified drivers with less restrictions than most learner's licence systems around the world. Learner drivers in Thailand do not need a licence, but must be accompanied by a fully qualified drivers who has been holding a licence for at least 3 years. Once they are ready, they must obtain a medical certificate confirming that they are free from active tuberculosis, elephantiasis, leprosy, alcoholism, drug addiction and other potential conditions affecting the ability to drive and public safety before attending tests at the Department of Land Transport or any local land transport offices.

=== Physical Test ===
At the test centre, the candidate must pass a physical test comprising:

1. Reaction test. The candidate must press the pedal of the testing equipment until the red light shows, then they must switch their foot to the braking pedal as soon as possible. The acceptable response time is 0.75 seconds or less.
2. Wide angle perception. The candidate must place their face against the testing machine, looking forward. The invigilator then switch on the white light on either side. The candidate must raise their hand correctly on the illuminated side.
3. Stereoacuity or depth perception. The Howard-Dolman apparatus, which consists of two white rods, one stationary (on the right) and another movable (on the left) is employed. The stationary rod is kept lit while the movable rod is not lit. The candidate must move the left rod such that its brightness is equal to that of the right rod. In other words, both rods are parallel if they have equal irradiance.
4. Colour blindness test. The candidate must specify the correct colour as shown on the equipment. Some test centres use traffic light, while others use a chart containing coloured dots. This is the most controversial part of the test, as many colour blind people are disqualified from the test at this stage, forcing them to drive without a licence and have to be punished. Thailand's National Human Rights Commission argued that most colour blind people can drive safely, but there was no positive response from the Department of Land Transport.

=== Theory Test ===
Once the physical test is completed, the candidate must attend a 5-hour lecture (1 day) comprising driving etiquettes, defensive driving, related laws and other useful topics. For larger vehicles, the lecture lasts 10 hours (2 days). When the lecture is completed, the candidate sit the theory test at the same day or the next working day. The exam contains 50 items and the passing score is 45. Prior to 2014, the passing score was 35. If the candidate fails in the theory test, they must attend the later test according to the instructions.

=== Driving Test ===
After passing the theory test, a candidate must pass the driving test off-road. There are 7 different manoeuvres but the test centre selects only 3 of them. These include

==== Car and Large Vehicles ====
1. Stopping at the kerbside safely and legally. The distance between the left wheels and the kerb must not exceed 25 cm.
2. Progressing and reversing in a narrow course.
3. Reverse parking into the bay on the left.
4. Stopping and starting on the hill. (Not used for Automatic Car).
5. Making a u-turn within a specified course.
6. Making a left or right turn within a specified course.
7. Driving in accordance with signage.

==== Motorcycle ====
1. Driving in accordance with signage.
2. Driving on a small pathway.
3. Driving on a Z-shaped path.
4. Driving on an S-shaped path.
5. Driving on a training course.

The highlighted manoeuvres are usually selected by most test centres. If the driver passes all the manoeuvres, they will be issued with a probationary driving licence. On the other hand, drivers who fail to pass one or more manoeuvres must get the appointment slip and attend the test again. The interval between two consecutive tests must be 3 days or more, or as specified by the invigilator. The overall process, from the first day of application to the issuance of the licence, must not exceed 90 days.

Since the appointment slots at land transport offices in large provinces are often occupied for many months, some learner drivers may attend an approved driving school, available locally, or the Land Transport School in Chatuchak, Bangkok and Pathum Thani. The process is roughly the same as those who choose to attend the testing centre. However, the driver must undergo at least 10 hours of driving practice, both off-road and on-road in addition to 5 hours of theory training. After the completion of programme, the driver must pass both theory and practical test, overseen by approved invigilators. The practical test at most driving schools is usually less stringent than that at the land transport office, as there is no three-day interval between failed and successful test. If the driver fail to complete a manoeuvre, they can get extra training and try again. The school then issue proof of completion to the learner, who then visit the land transport office to have their licences issued. The students must pay a tuition fee to the driving school in addition to the licence fee charged by the department of land transport.

Driving school must maintain standards set by the Department of Land Transport, such as having qualified driving teachers and a suitable driving course. The programme used by private driving school must strictly follow one used by the government-run Land Transport School.

== Extension of the licence ==
Full driving licence may be extended once its validity is less than 6 months.Probationary licence holders may upgrade their licence once they have held the licence for at least one year. Before 2021, a full licence may be extended once its validity is 90 days or less, while a probationary licence can be exchanged for a full licence if it is valid for 60 days or less. Regardless of timeframe, the driver must obtaind a medical clearance and pass a physical test again in order to be able to hold a further licence. If the licence has expired for less than a year, the process remains the same. If, however, the licence has expired for more than 1 but less than 3 years, the holder must attend the lecture and pass the theory test. A complete test, theory and practical, is needed if the licence has expired for 3 years or more.

== Fees ==
As of 2026, the fees payable are dependent on the validity of the licence. For a licence under the Automobile Act, the annual fee is ฿100 for cars and ฿50 for motorcycles and other vehicles. There is an additional charge of ฿5 for paperwork. For A and P licences issued under the Land Transport Act, the annual fee is ฿50, plus an additional charge of ฿50. For example,

Licence type	Calculation	Licence Fee
Private car	(5 years × ฿100) + ฿5	฿505
Public car	(3 years × ฿100) + ฿5	฿305
Probationary car	(2 years × ฿100) + ฿5	฿205
Private motorcycle/tricycle	(5 years × ฿50) + ฿5	฿255
Public motorcycle/tricycle	(3 years × ฿50) + ฿5	฿155
Probationary motorcycle/tricycle	(2 years × ฿50) + ฿5	฿105
Tractor/Road roller	(5 years × ฿50) + ฿5	฿255
A and P licences	(3 years × ฿50) + ฿50	฿200

If the licence is lost, stolen or significantly defaced, the driver should apply for a replacement within 15 days. For car and motorcycle licences issued under the Automobile Act, the replacement fee is half the original fee (excluding paperwork charge); the maximum payable charge is capped at ฿100. Again, a paperwork charge of ฿5 is still applicable. For A and P licences, a replacement costs ฿30. To sum up, the following table shows the replacement cost of driving licences.

Licence type	Calculation	Replacement Fee
Private car	฿500 ÷ 2 = 250 (capped at ฿100 and add ฿๊5)	฿105
Public car	฿300 ÷ 2 = 150 (capped at ฿100 and add ฿๊5)	฿105
Probationary car	฿200 ÷ 2 = 100 (add ฿๊5)	฿105
Private motorcycle/tricycle	฿250 ÷ 2 = 125 (capped at ฿100 and add ฿๊5)	฿105
Public motorcycle/tricycle	฿150 ÷ 2 = 75 (add ฿๊5)	฿80
Probationary motorcycle/tricycle	฿100 ÷ 2 = 50 (add ฿๊5)	฿55
Tractor/Road roller	฿250 ÷ 2 = 125 (capped at ฿100 and add ฿๊5)	฿105
A and P licences	Not applicable	฿30

These fees do not include other expenses, such as tuition fees charged by driving schools and medical/criminal certificate fees.

== Use overseas / conversions ==
Foreigners holding driving licences from countries with signatories to any treaty or agreement with Thailand may apply for conversion of driving licence to drive in Thailand. Holders of a Thai driving license do not need to acquire an International Driving Permit (IDP) to drive in any ASEAN countries; this also applies vice versa whereby citizens of a member state from ASEAN only need to possess a valid driving licence of their respective countries to drive in Thailand, and do not require any conversions or an IDP.

== See also ==
- Vehicle registration plates of Thailand
