= Office of Transport and Traffic Policy and Planning =

Department of the Thai government

- สำนักงานนโยบายและแผนการขนส่งและจราจร

Agency overview
- Formed: 2002; 23 years ago
- Jurisdiction: Government of Thailand
- Headquarters: Bangkok, Thailand
- Annual budget: 540.7 million THB
- Agency executive: Punya Chupanit
- Parent department: Ministry of Transport
- Website: www.otp.go.th

The Office of Transport and Traffic Policy and Planning or OTP (Thai: สำนักงานนโยบายและแผนการขนส่งและจราจร) is a department of the Thai government, under the Ministry of Transport. It is responsible for creating policy for transport and traffic. It was created in 2002 as part of a policy reform. It is responsible for planning mass transit in Thailand via master plans such as the Mass Rapid Transit Master Plan in Bangkok Metropolitan Region or M-Map, and feasibility studies such as those for the Khon Kaen Light Rail. It does not operate transit networks, which may be managed by the MRTA, State Railway of Thailand or private enterprises. The current Director General is Punya Chupanit
