= Uttamanusorn Bridge =

Uttamanusorn Bridge สะพานอุตตมานุสรณ์
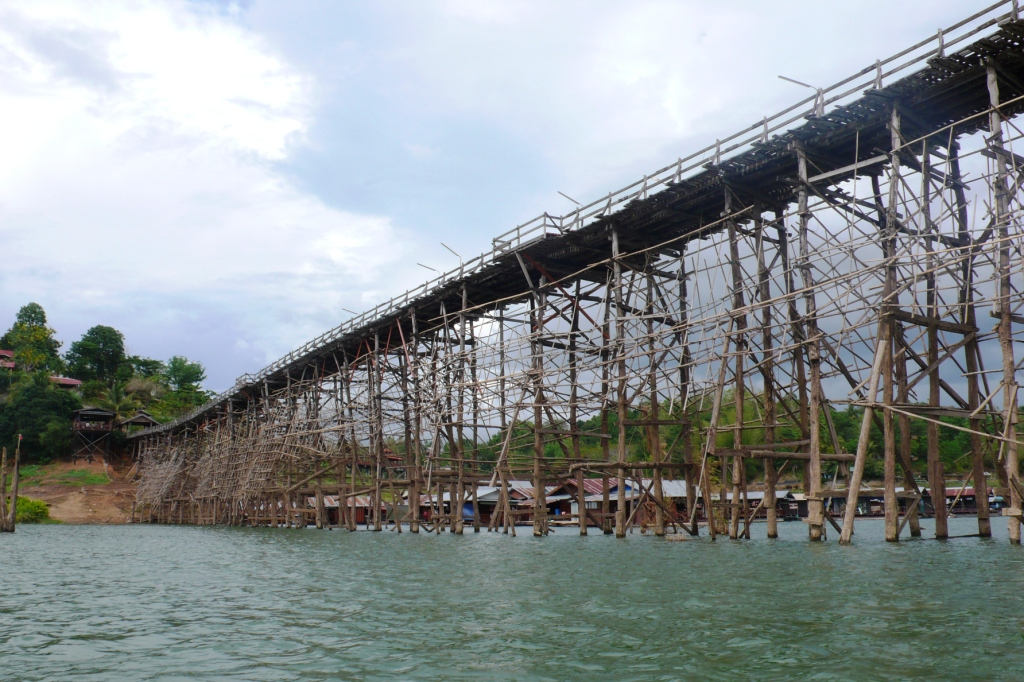
- Coordinates: 15.14020°N 98.44938°E
- Carries: Two lanes
- Crosses: Songaria River
- Locale: Nong Lu, Sangkhla Buri, Kanchanaburi

Characteristics
- Design: Wooden footbridge
- Total length: 445 m (1,460 ft)

History
- Construction start: 1986
- Opened: 1987

Location
- Interactive map of Uttamanusorn Bridge

Uttamanusorn Bridge (Thai: สะพานอุตตมานุสรณ์; lit. 'Uttama Memorial Bridge'), commonly known as Mon Bridge (สะพานมอญ, pronounced [sā.pʰāːn mɔ̄ːn]; Mon: ဒဒန်ဆု) or Wooden Mon Bridge (สะพานไม้มอญ), is a wooden footbridge in Tambon Nong Lu, Sangkhla Buri District, northwest Kanchanaburi Province, Thailand. It spans across the Songaria River.

Uttamanusorn Bridge is the longest wooden bridge in Thailand and is the second longest in the world after the Mandalay's U Bein Bridge in Myanmar. Its total length is 445 metres (1,460 ft) (though it is commonly mis-reported as 850 metres).

It is named in honor of Luangpho Uttama, a Mon monk who was an abbot of Wat Wang Wiwekaram. He initiated the construction of this bridge in 1986 with local Mon workers. Construction was done by Mon labourers and was completed in 1987.

Uttamanusorn Bridge is considered a landmark and is one of the notable attractions of Kanchanaburi, as well as the River Kwai Bridge and Death Railway, Sai Yok Noi Waterfall, and Three Pagodas Pass. The bridge is seen as showing the friendship between the Mon and Thai people as it connects the Mon village of Wang Kha with the Thai town of Sangkhla Buri.

Locals walk across the bridge to make merit by giving food to monks, a daily routine.

== History ==
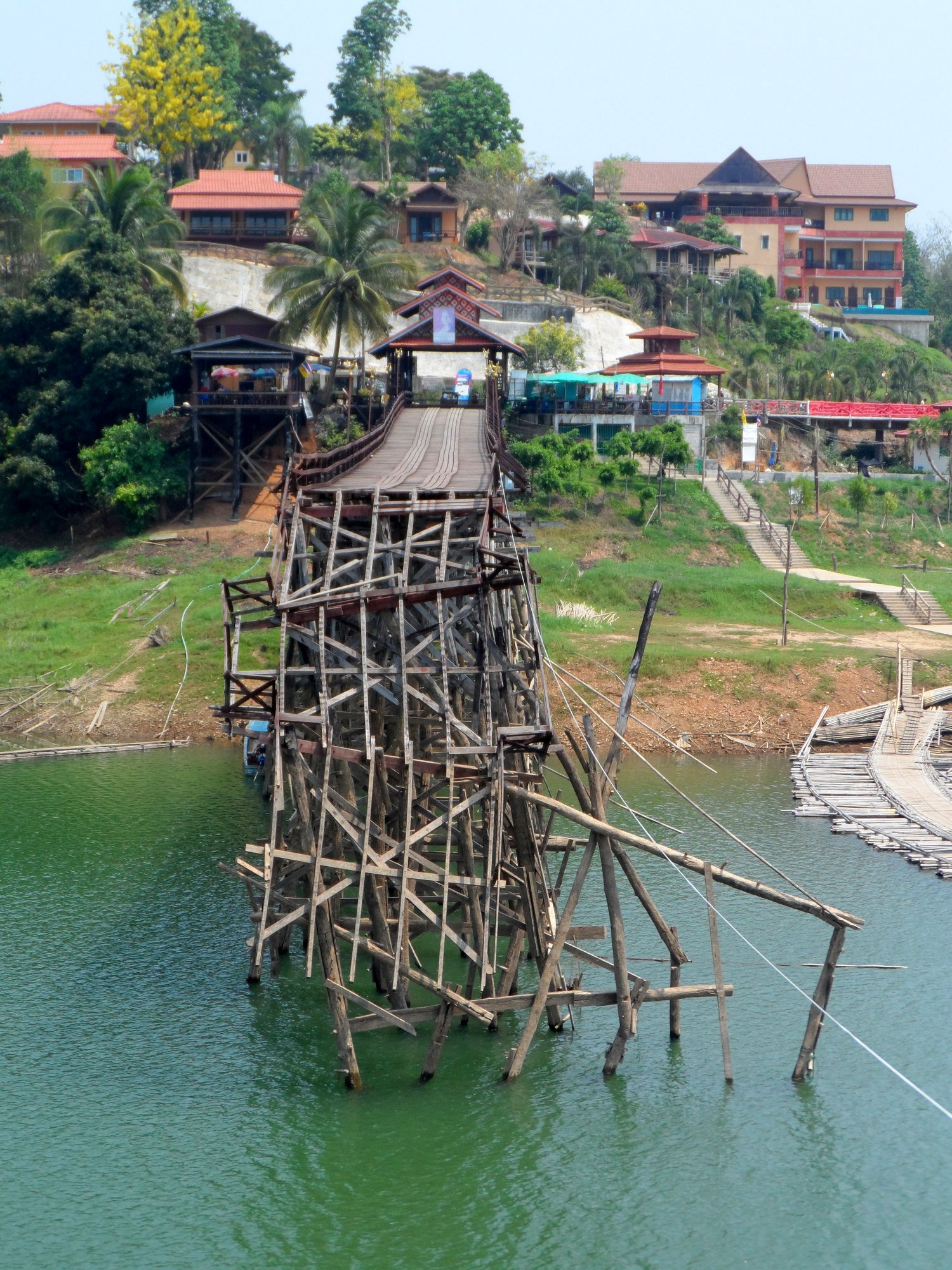
Remains of the bridge on 10 April 2014

In 1986, Mon monk Luangpho Uttama initiated the construction of the bridge, with construction finishing in 1987. Uttamanusorn Bridge replaced a floating bamboo bridge which cost one baht for villagers to cross, leading it to be called "bridge of one baht". Majority of the labourers who built the bridge were from the local Mon community who were mostly refugees from Myanmar given sanctuary by Luangpho. Once completed, it connected the Thai town of Sangkhla Buri with the Mon village of Wang Kha. The two settlements were split by the creation of the Vajiralongkorn Reservoir in 1984.

=== Reconstruction ===
At 6:30 p.m on 28 July 2013, the middle 30 metres of the bridge collapsed amid heavy rain. After three days of heavy rain, flash floods swept logs down the Songaria river from Thung Yai Naresuan Wildlife Sanctuary and increased the amount of the bridge that had collapsed to 70 metres. A few raft houses had also been chained to the bridge's support struts and part of the reason it collapsed due to the houses dragging the struts from the bridge.

Before the bridge could be rebuilt, a temporary raft bridge built out of bamboo was erected across the river. Construction on the bridge began on 17 August and lasted six days. It was supervised by the abbot of Wat Wang Wiwekaram, Phra Maha Suchat Siriphanyo. The Miracle of Life Foundation, under the royal patronage of Princess Ubol Ratana, donated 100,000 baht to the bridge's construction. The fare to use the bridge was ฿80.

The bridge underwent repairs in 1992, 2009, and 2010 according to Phra Maha Suchat Siriphanyo. Repairs were done by residents who considered it as a form of merit-making, and were led by Wat Wang Wiwekaram.

==== Delays ====
In 2014, restoration efforts were delayed. Restoration could not begin immediately due to high water level of the river. Also according to Chaiwat Limwantha, who was the Governor of Kanchanburi and chairman of the Saphan Uttamanusorn Restoration committee, the ironwood planks needed were both rare and not found in Thailand.

The committee had also decided that in order to keep its identity and look, most of the wood for the new bridge would be sourced from the old logs that became submerged in July 2013. This meant that divers would have to be employed to identify where the logs drifted. A separate committee chaired by Sangkhla Buri chief Chathip Ruchanaseree was established in October 2013 to locate the submerged wood. Between October 18–25, the committee brought in a scuba diving team from Vajiralongkorn Dam to locate the wood, but only managed to find 5 planks. Another attempt discovered 21 planks between December 9–23. In response to the low amount of wood discovered, Chathip said "the amount of planks found is probably only 1% of the total wood needed." This lack of result was attributed to lack of proper equipment and lighting, and strong river currents. On 10 October, operations to salvage submerged wood was called off. Chathip eventually decided to source new wood.

The task of finding a new source was assigned to the Deputy Governor, who found no legal source within Thailand. However, sources of ironwood were present in Myanmar and Cambodia, but at high import costs. Phra Maha Suchat Siriphanyo suggested to the Deputy Governor that ironwood could be sourced locally by cutting down submerged trees in the northern part of Khao Laem national park, which would've been illegal.

Around the same time, local residences donated nails and knots to Wat Wang Wiwekaram in order to support the bridge's restoration. The Government Lottery Office had donated ฿5 million to the committee, with Siam Commercial Bank also donating ฿2 million. A further ฿500,000 was donated by other organizations and individuals.

==== Re-opening ====
Kanchanaburi provincial hall initially awarded a ฿16.35 million contract to Por Rungruang Watsaduphan Co with the condition that reconstruction was achieved within 120 days or by 6 August 2014. This faced some backlash from locals who wished to repair it themselves. Work began on 8 April 2014. By 4 September 2014, Por Rungruang Watsaduphan had failed to complete the project, having missed two deadlines. By its 6 August deadline, it had only completed 30% of what was required and had spent around ฿10 million. The company claimed it was unable to finish the project on time due to the difficulty of acquiring materials. Provincial authorities later decided to terminate the company's contract and awarded ฿10 million as compensation. Governor Chaiwat Limwantha defended the decision by saying the company deserved to get money for its investment into the project. Provincial authority councillor Thawat Trairuntrakun later petitioned for the National Anti-Corruption Commission to investigate Por Rungruang Watsaduphan after claiming the compensation was wrongly awarded. Villagers also petitioned the National Council for Peace and Order to review the decision to compensate.

In September, the job was handed over to engineers and carpenters of the Ninth Division who completed it in 36 days. with the help of locals. Commander of the division, Major General Nat Intaracharoen had said that new Prime Minister Prayut Chan-o-cha had ordered quick and careful repairs of the bridge.

The last plank and nail were ceremonially completed on 4 October.

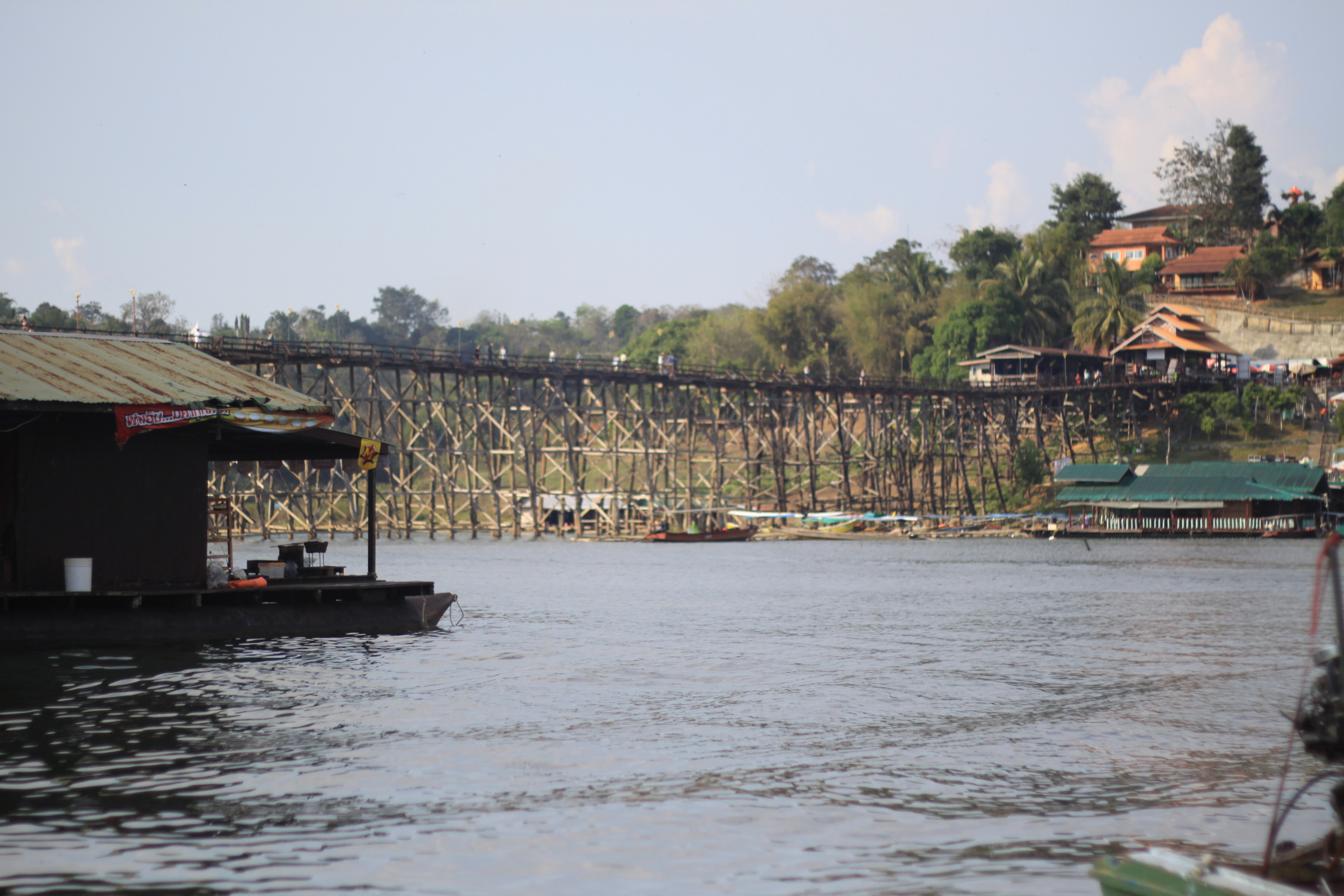
The new bridge in 2015

Before its opening, local Mon, Thai and Karen residents applied wood stains to the bridge with provincial authorities on 12 October. Phra Maha Suchat Siriphanyo described the public event as a way to “bring back the soul of the bridge”.

Uttamanusorn Bridge re-opened on 18 October 2014, the 8th anniversary of Luangpho's death. The opening was attended by over 3,000 people.

=== Post-resortation ===
At 9:30 p.m on 20 May 2018, two volunteers of the Kanchanaburi Forest Protection Foundation discovered a fire burning from one of the wooden pillars. The fire was extinguished within 15 minutes by officers of the Sangkhla Buri police station with soldiers. Police suspected the fire was caused a smoker whose cigarette butt landed against the bridge's wood.

In mid-July 2018, the region became a low-pressure area caused by Tropical Storm Son-Tinh. This caused heavy floods along the Thai-Myanmar border region, with locals fearing a repeat to what happened in 2013. In response, Kanchanaburi Governor Jirasak Phumsawat ordered authorities to keep a close watch over the stability of the bridge, with the bridge being closed for two days. Uttamanusorn bridge re-opened on 22 July, with clean-ups being carried out around the bridge's pillars.

As part of the COVID-19 pandemic in Thailand, the Department of Disease Control closed Uttamanusorn Bridge on 6 August 2021, isolating Wang Kha. This followed around 130 people testing positive for the virus in the region. This coincided with the construction of a community isolation center by Pakorn Kanwanlee, the District Chief for Sangkhla Buri.
