= Songkalia =

Songkalia (Thai: ซองกาเลีย) or Songkaria (ซองกาเรีย) may refer to:

- Songkalia River, a river in Western Thailand
- Ban Songkalia (also known as Songkurai after the Japanese POW camp situated there during World War II), a village on the river
