= Konkoita =

Konkoita Kaeng Khoi Tha
- POW Camp
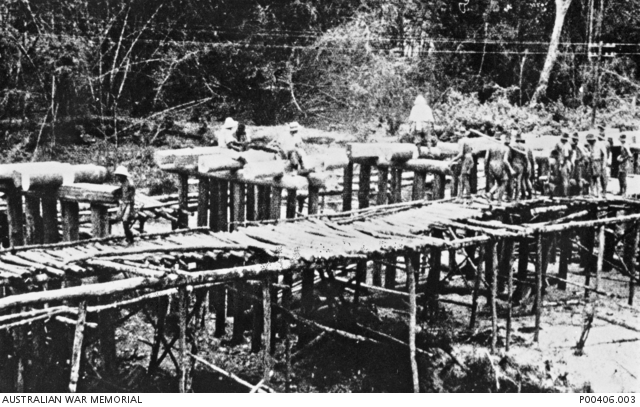
- Bridge building at Konkoita (1943)

- Location in Thailand
- Coordinates: 14.9453°N 98.5432°E
- Country: Thailand
- Province: Kanchanaburi
- District: Sangkhla Buri
- Tambon: Nong Lu
- Time zone: UTC+7 (ICT)

Konkoita (Japanese: コンコイタ, originally from Karen; approximated in Thai as Kaeng Khoi Tha แก่งคอยท่า or เกริงกวยทะ RTGS: Kroeng Kuai Tha) is a former prisoner of war camp in the Sangkhla Buri District of the Kanchanaburi Province, Thailand. Located near the Karen village of Ban Kroeng Kruai, it was the location where the two sides of the Burma Railway met on 17 October 1943 at 262.87 kilometres from the starting point in Thailand. Konkoita and neighbouring villages were flooded in June 1984 by the construction of the Vajiralongkorn Dam. The population in the area was resettled several kilometres from the original villages.

== Burma Railway ==
In 1939, plans had been developed by the Empire of Japan to construct a rail road connecting Thailand with Burma. Construction of the Burma Railway started on 16 September 1942. On 9 May 1943, the first 700 prisoners of war arrived at Konkoita to build the railway, and started building three work camps. On 15 May, there was a cholera outbreak at Shimo Nicke (Shimo Ni Thea). An advice by the British commander Colonel Harris to the Japanese Lieutenant colonel Banno to stop transit parties into Konkoita was not heeded, and cholera spread over five camps. In August construction started on a large trestle bridge near Konkoita.

On 17 October 1943, both sides of the Burma Railway met near Konkoita at 262.87 kilometres from the Thai, and 152.13 kilometres from the Burmese starting point. The meeting point was about 18 kilometres (11 mi) south of the border at Three Pagodas Pass. A holiday was declared for 25 October which was chosen as the ceremonial opening of the line. The Japanese staff would travel by train C56 31 from Nong Pladuk, Thailand to Thanbyuzayat, Burma. A copper spike was driven at the meeting point by commanding General Eiguma Ishida, and a memorial plaque was revealed.

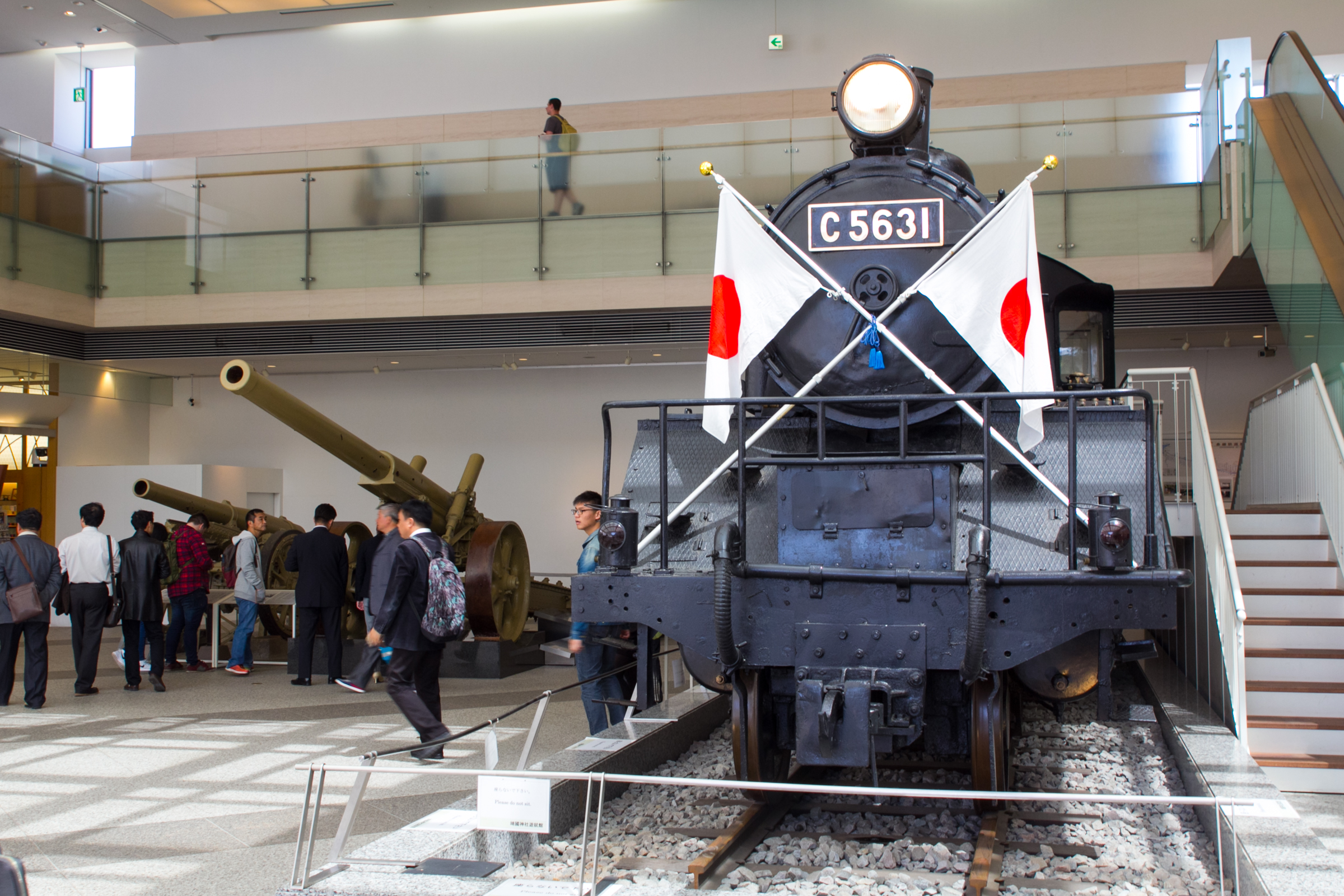
C56 31 was the first train to run the Burma Railway

The construction of the Burma Railway had taken 16 months, and had resulted in approximately 100,000 deaths. The prisoners of war were moved from the jungle camps to base camps from where many were transported to Japan. Many of the Asian forced labourers stayed behind and were tasked to maintain the line. The first train to pass the line was moved to the Yasukuni Shrine in Tokyo where it is displayed without mentioning the human cost of the railway line.

In September 1945, there was a railway accident which caused the collapse of the bridge near Konkoita. In October 1946, the Thai section of the line was sold to the Government of Thailand for £1,250,000. The money was used to compensate neighbouring countries and colonies for material stolen by Japan during the construction of the railway. On 1 February 1947, two people including Momluang Kri Dechatiwong, the Minister of Transport, were killed on an inspection tour 500 metres before Konkoita station. Their trolley was supposed to pass over the bridge after a curve, however it had burned down and collapsed causing the trolley to drop 8.5 metres. After the accident, it was decided to end the line at Nam Tok and reuse the remainder to rehabilitate the line.

== Vajiralongkorn Dam ==
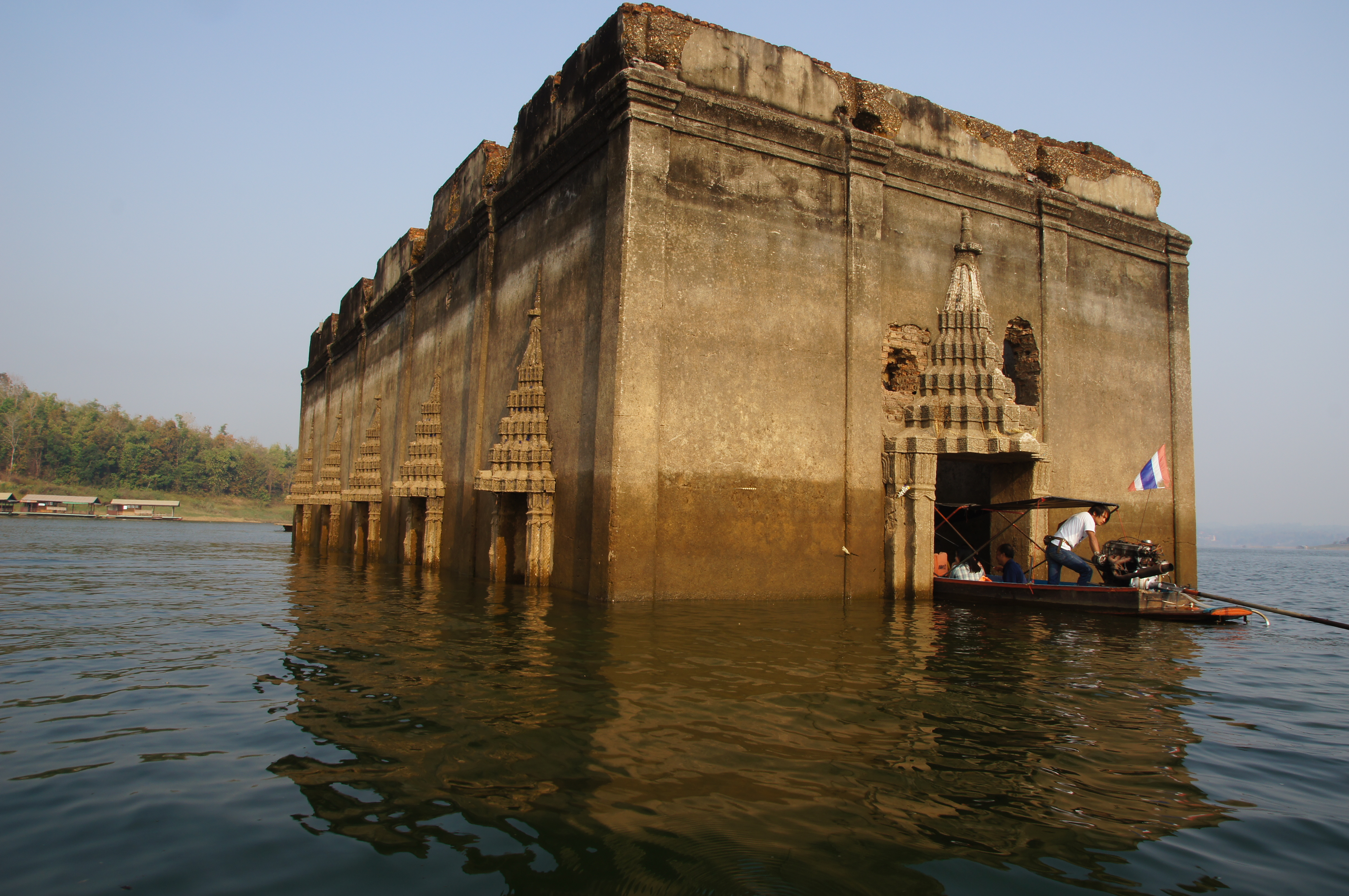
A flooded temple in the reservoir

In the 1980s, it was decided to build the Vajiralongkorn Dam on the Khwae Noi River to generate hydroelectricity. Konkoita, the neighbouring Mon village of Sangklaburi, and several other villages were flooded in June 1984 by the construction of the dam. The population was resettled several kilometres from the original sites. The meeting point and about 50 kilometre of railway is now submerged, and the memorial has been moved to higher ground. A hospital built in 1963 in Sangklaburi was rebuilt in Huay Malai where it served two refugee camps along the Myanmar border in the 2010s.
