= Songkurai =

Song Karia ซองกาเรีย Songkurai
- Village
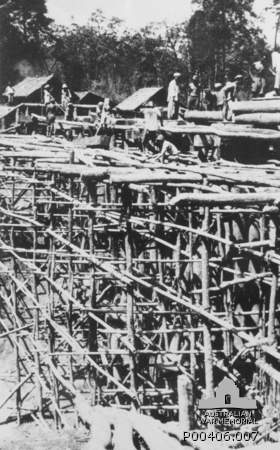
- Bridge building at Camp Songkurai (1943)

- Location in Thailand
- Coordinates: 15.2167°N 98.4453°E
- Country: Thailand
- Province: Kanchanaburi
- District: Sangkhla Buri
- Tambon: Nong Lu
- Time zone: UTC+7 (ICT)

Ban Song Karia (Thai: บ้านซองกาเรีย), also spelled Songkalia (ซองกาเลีย) and alternatively known as Songkurai (from Japanese: ソンクライ), is a village in the Sangkhla Buri District of the Kanchanaburi Province, Thailand near the border with Myanmar at the Three Pagodas Pass. It was the location of three World War II Japanese Prisoner of War Camps located about 13 kilometres (8.1 mi) south of the Thai/Burma border.

== Camp Songkurai ==
Songkurai was the location of three work camps. The first 393 Australian prisoners arrived on 25 May 1943. In August 1943, the British 'F' Force consisting of 670 British and 1,020 Australian prisoners was concentrated at Songkurai. The prisoners were tasked to create a 15 kilometre stretch of railroad including a wooden bridge over the Songkalia River (Huai Ro Khi).

The prisoners were forced to work, under harsh conditions, on the construction of the Burma Railway. They suffered extreme hardship from poor rations, disease and brutal treatment. The bridge over the Songkalia River became known as the Bridge of 600, because 600 prisoners died during its construction. When the first POWs arrived, there was already a cholera outbreak at the Asian forced labourers camp. The outbreak was finally beaten in mid-June. On 10 August, cholera returned.

On 17 November 1943, the last prisoners left the camps which have now been taken over by the jungle.

== Later history ==
After Japan's capitulation, the British Army removed about four kilometres of rail road track between Nikki (Ni Thea) and Songkurai because it was deemed unsafe. First lieutenant Hiroshi Abe, the construction supervisor, was later convicted as a B/C class war criminal and sentenced to death. His sentence was later commuted to life imprisonment. He served 11 years.

A school has been built on a former camp site, and the river is now crossed by Highway 323 towards the border. The village is currently known as Ban Song Karia.
