= Palai Japan/Payathonzu sub-township =

Palai Japan Village
- Village
- ပလိုၚ်ဂျပါန်
- Location in Myanmar
- Coordinates: 15°16′25″N 98°24′05″E
- Country: Myanmar
- State: Kayin
- District: Kawkareik District
- Township: Payathonzu sub-township
- Village tract: Palai Japan
- Time zone: UTC+6.30 (Myanmar Standard Time)

Palai Japan village (Mon: ပလိုၚ်ဂျပါန်, Palai Kya Pan; Thai: บ่อญี่ปุ่น, B̀x ỵī̀pùn; Burmese: ဂျပန်ရေတွင်း Jack Pan Ye Dwin, Japanese: 日本の池) is located in Burma, Kayin State, Kawkareik District, it is located in Payathonzu sub-township, near the demarcated Thai-Burmese border. It is about 3 miles from Payathonzu and Palai Japan. During the Japanese occupation, it was known as a Japanese military base in Kanchanaburi military history, it is now the headquarters of the New Mon State Party.
