= Nong Lu =

Nong Lu หนองลู
- Tambon (sub-district)
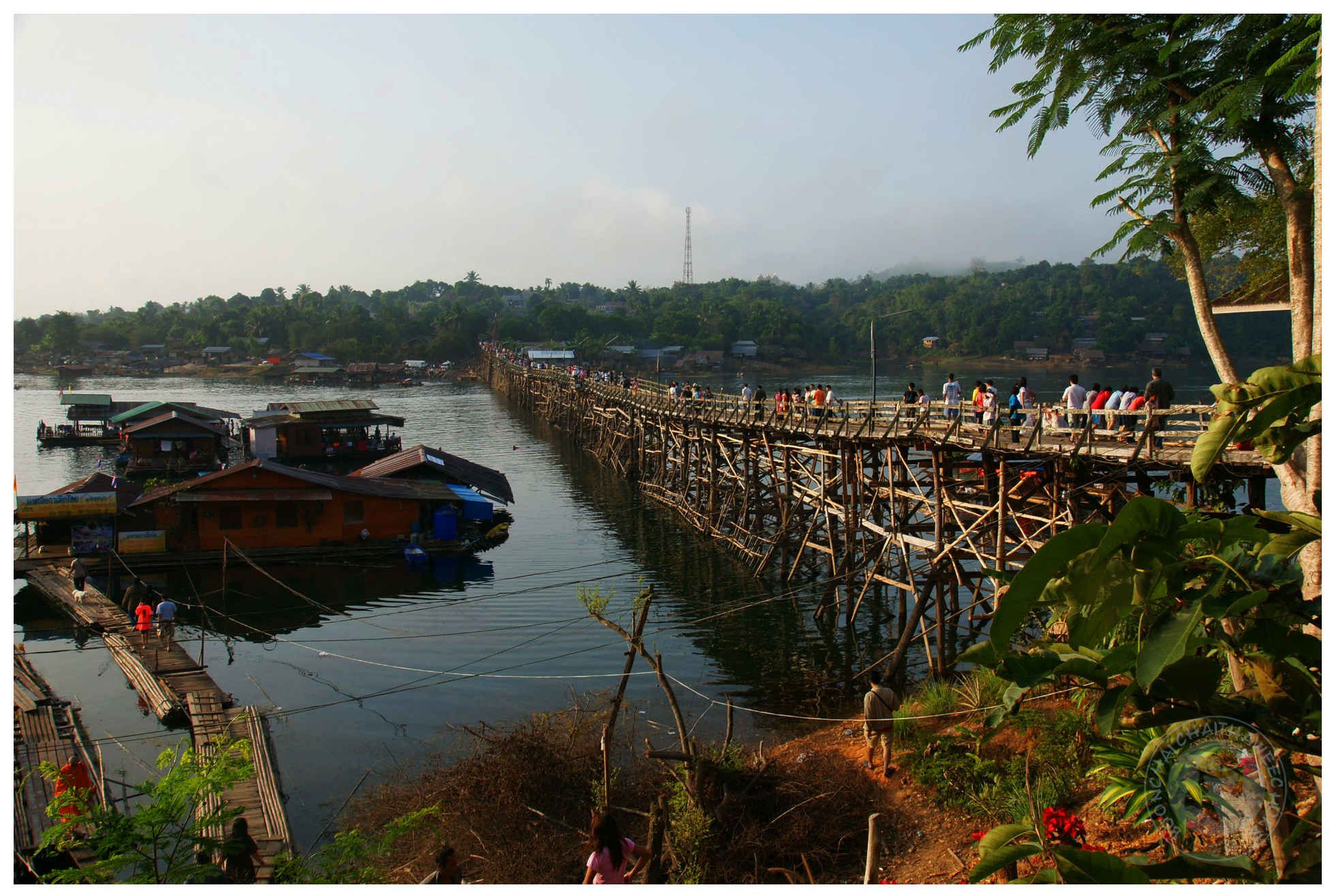
- The Uttamanusorn Bridge

- Location in Thailand
- Coordinates: 15.1505°N 98.4525°E
- Country: Thailand
- Province: Kanchanaburi Province
- District: Sangkhla Buri district
- Established: 2 March 1995

Area
  - Total: 1,267 km^{2} (489 sq mi)

Population (2017)
  - Total: 26,524
  - Density: 20.93/km^{2} (54.22/sq mi)
- Time zone: UTC+7 (ICT)

Nong Lu (Thai: หนองลู) is a sub-district (tambon) of Sangkhla Buri district of Kanchanaburi province, Thailand. The name is Karen and refers to the palm used for roofing. It is located near the border with Myanmar. Nong Lu covers the main town of the district, which is often known by the district's name as Sangkhlaburi (สังขละบุรี); the municipality (thesaban) is officially known as Wangka (วังกะ).

Nong Lu is best known for the Uttamanusorn Bridge, the longest wooden bridge in Thailand, which connects the town of Sangkhla Buri to the Mon village of Ban Wangka. Other locations in the tambon are Wat Saam Prasob, a partially submerged temple, the Three Pagodas Pass which serves as the main pass into Myanmar, and Wat Wang Wiwekaram, a Buddhist temple built in 1953, and moved to Ban Wangka in 1985.

== History ==
According to legend, the Buddhist monk Tong Su settled in the area after a pilgrimage to Burma. His reputation for curing people drew in a crowd who settled along the Songkalia, Khwae Noi and other rivers. The border area of Thailand and Myanmar, was settled by Karen and Thai people. From the 16th century onwards, Mon started to move into the area from Burma. Until 1948, all received Thai citizenship.

After the independence of Burma, Mon started to emigrate to the area as stateless citizens from June 1949 onwards. They were allowed to live and work only in the border provinces. Nowadays, these different ethnic groups along with other refugees from Myanmar, live together in the Nong Lu sub-district.

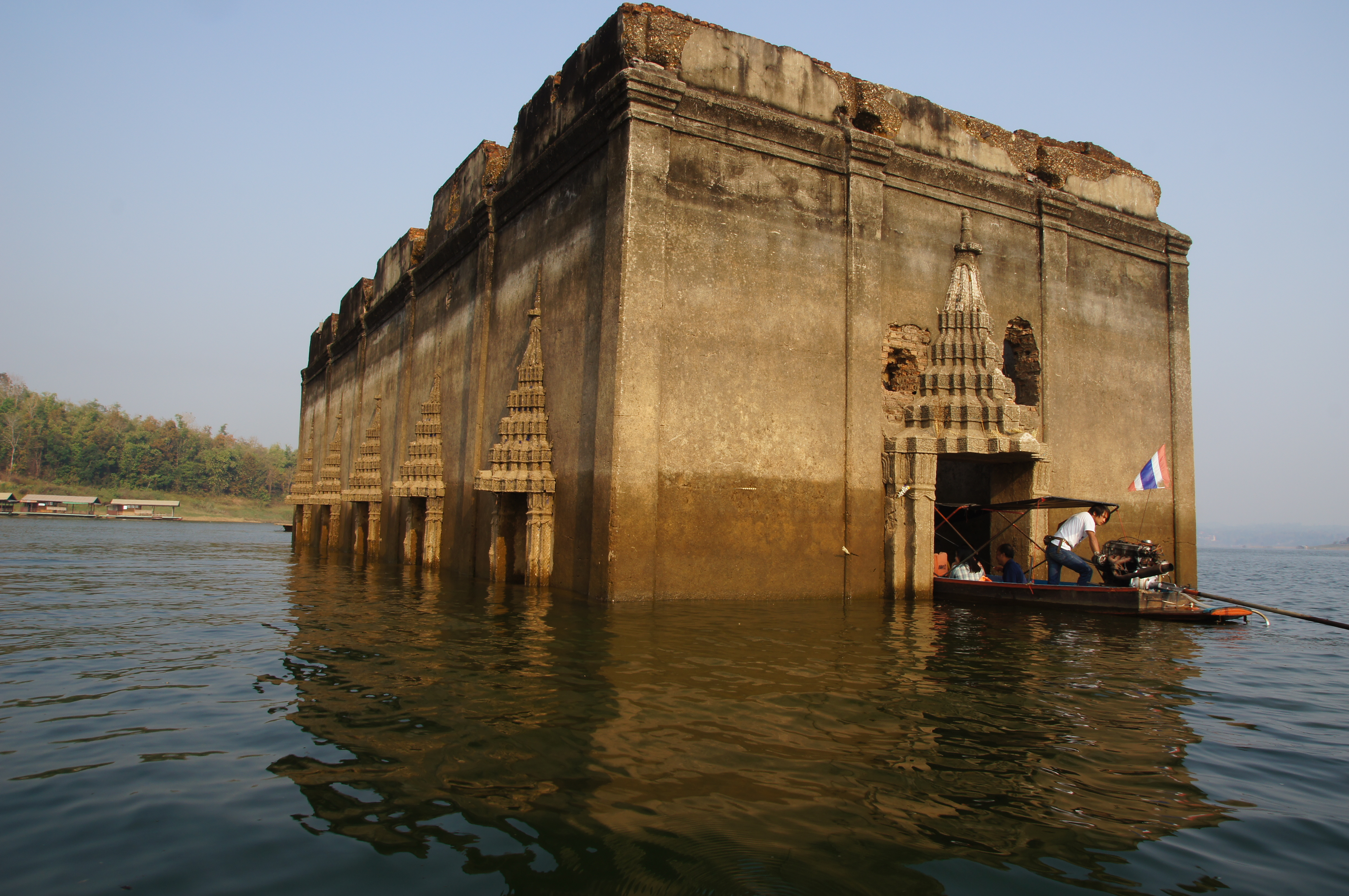
Wat Saam Prasob

The Vajiralongkorn Dam was constructed between 1979 and 1984 on the Khwae Noi River to generate hydroelectricity. Konkoita and several other villages were flooded in June 1984 by the construction of the dam, and their populations were resettled several kilometres further on higher ground. Wat Saam Prasob, the main temple of the old town of Sangkhla Buri has remained visible even though it is partially submerged.

The Nong Lu sub-district was established on 2 March 1995. The economy is mainly based on agriculture, and tourism. It can be reached by Highway 322, and is located in a mountainous area with some plains. The soil fertility is low.

== Sangkhla Buri and Ban Wangka ==
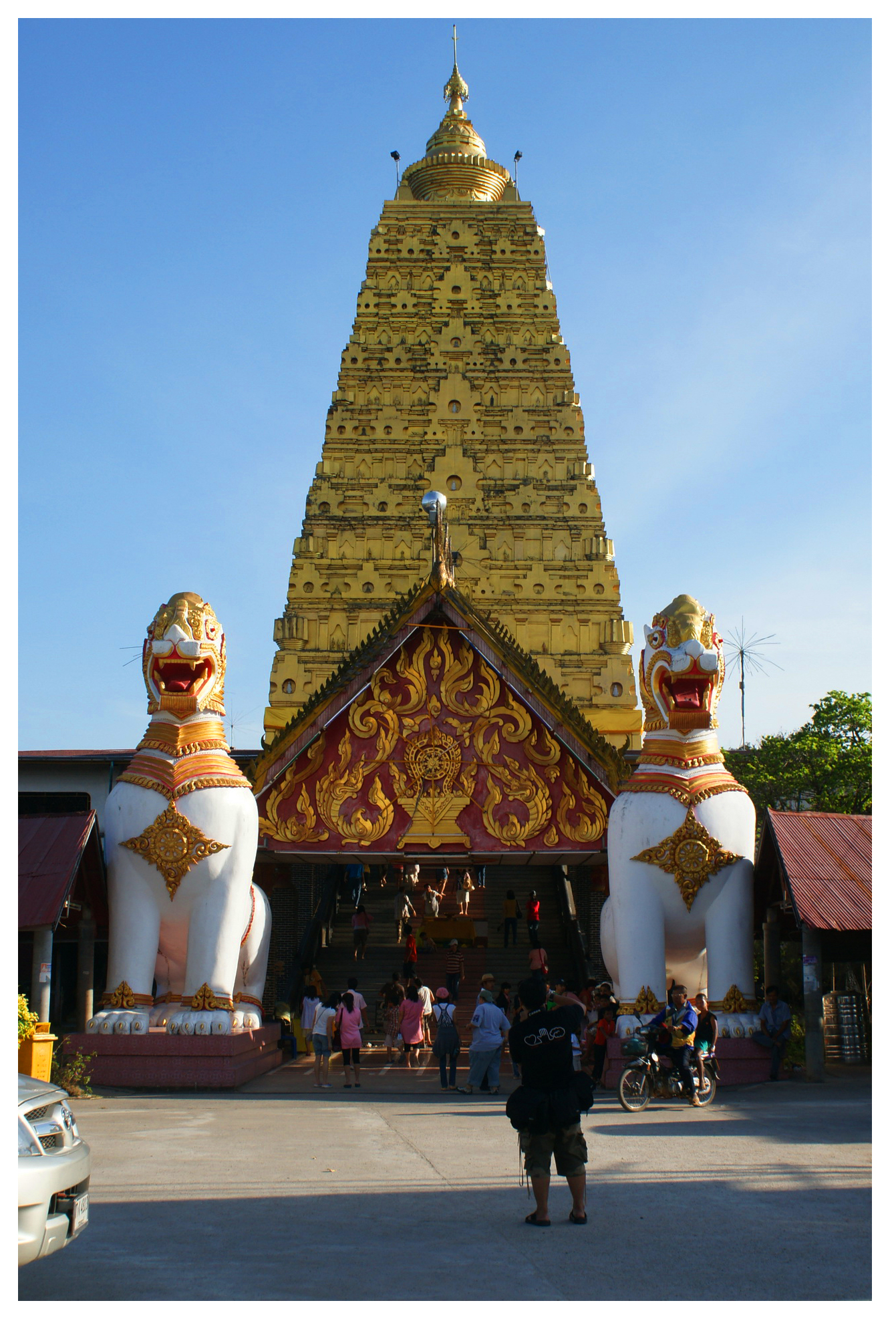
Wat Wang Wiwekaram

Sangkhla Buri was rebuilt on the eastern bank of the Songkalia River, and the Mon village of Ban Wangka was rebuilt on the opposite side. In 1986, Luangpho Uttama, the abbot of Wat Wang Wiwekaram, started to construct a wooden bridge for pedestrians across the river. This bridge — the Uttamanusorn Bridge — is the longest wooden bridge in Thailand. The wooden bridge was washed away by floods on 28 July 2013. It was rebuilt on 18 October 2014. Later, it was joined by a permanent bridge for motor vehicles. Ban Wangka is also home to Wat Wang Wiwekaram, a Buddhist temple built in 1953 by Mon and Karen people, which was relocated to the village in 1985. The temple features a golden pagoda modelled after the Mahabodhi Temple in Bodh Gaya.

Due in large part to these attractions, along with the authentic Mon clothing and lifestyle Ban Wangka has become a destination for tourists. The town and the village have been growing, and as of 2015, the population is estimated at 10,000 people. Between 13 and 18 April, the Songkran Festival in Sangkhla Buri attracts large crowds.

== Other locations ==
The Three Pagodas Pass is located in Nong Lu at the village of Phra Chedi Sam Ong. The pass serves as one of the entry points into Myanmar.

Songkurai is located to the south of the Three Pagodas Pass. It was the location of the prisoner-of-war camp used to build a bridge over the Songkalia River for the Burma Railway.

Konkoita was the location where the Thai and Burma side of the Burma Railway met on 17 October 1943. The location is nowadays submerged by the construction of the Vajiralongkorn Dam.

== Bibliography ==
- Sangchumnong, Aunkrisa (2016). Developing a sustainsable tourism model for cultural heritage destinations: The case study of Ban Wangka Mon village, Thailand (Thesis). Bangkok: Assumption University.
