= Hiroshi Abe (officer) =

Japanese soldier and admitted war criminal (born c. 1922)

- 阿部 宏
- Born: c. 1922
- Military career
- Allegiance: Empire of Japan; Japan
- Branch: Imperial Japanese Army; Japan Ground Self-Defense Force
- Service years: 1941–1952
- Rank: First Lieutenant
- Unit: Fifth Rail Regiment
- Conflicts: World War II

Hiroshi Abe (阿部 宏, Abe Hiroshi; born c. 1922) was a Japanese army officer convicted of war crimes. As a first lieutenant in the Imperial Japanese Army's Fifth Rail Regiment during World War II, he supervised construction of the Burma Railway at Songkurai. Over 600 British prisoners of war died under his supervision.

Abe was sentenced to death by hanging as a B/C class war criminal and imprisoned in Changi Prison. In 1947, his sentence was commuted to 15 years. He was released in 1957.

"The construction of the railway was in itself a war crime. For my part in it, I am a war criminal."

In 1995, Abe testified against the Japanese government in a lawsuit seeking compensation for Koreans in Japan during World War II. "This was probably the first time for a former Japanese officer to testify in court in the trial of war compensation issues."
