= Three Pagodas Fault =

Sandeep Barnwal 52 (Blogger)

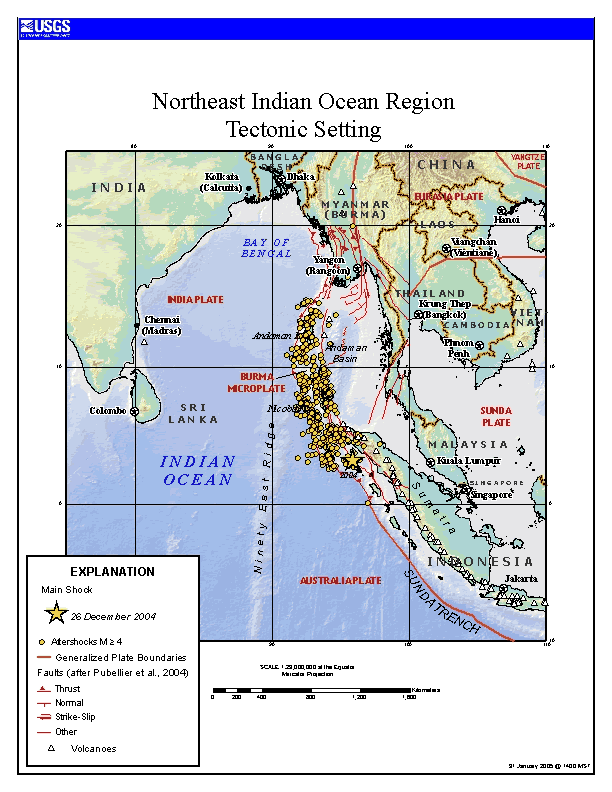
Map of the tectonic setting of the 2004 Indian Ocean earthquake showing the fault lines across the Tenasserim Hills

The Three Pagodas Fault is a right-lateral displacement strike-slip fault between Burma and Thailand named after the Three Pagodas Pass. It developed as a consequence of the collision between the Indian and the Eurasian Plate. The Three Pagodas Fault Zone (TPFZ) is a roughly 50 km wide zone separating the westernmost range of the Tenasserim Hills from the Tenasserim coast in Myanmar. The whole area is marked by a great number of fault traces and homoclinal ridges of Paleozoic limestone.

The Three Pagodas Fault Zone accommodates the southeastward extrusion of Indochina, with stresses twisting clockwise. Together with the Wang Chao Fault and the Mae Ping Fault, it runs parallel to the Red River Fault. There is a fear that a future earthquake caused by the TPFZ and the Sri Sawat Fault Zone (SSFZ) could damage the large dams in Kanchanaburi Province in the future and that it could cause widespread damage to Bangkok. There was already a severe earthquake in the area about 2,500 years ago.
