= Wat Wang Wiwekaram =

- วัดวังก์วิเวการาม ဘာကျာ်ဇၞော်အ္စာတၠဥတ္တမ
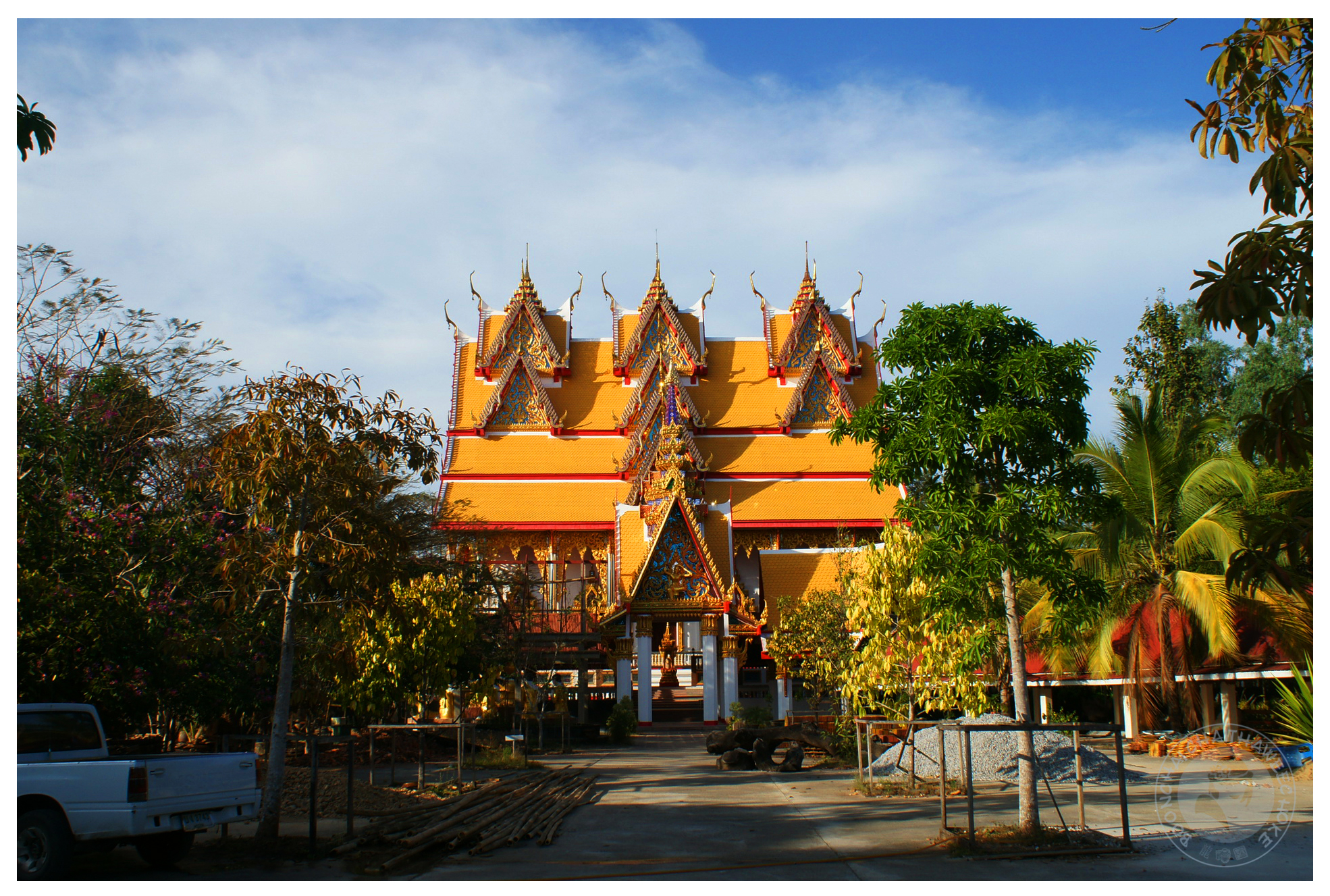

- Location within Thailand

Religion
- Affiliation: Theravada Buddhism

Location
- Country: Nong Lu, Kanchanaburi, Rural Road 3024, Thailand
- Interactive map of Wat Wang Wiwekaram
- Coordinates: 15°07′59″N 98°26′34″E

Architecture
- Founder: Monk Luangpho Uttama
- Completed: 73 years ago

Wat Wang Wiwekaram (Thai: วัดวังก์วิเวการาม, pronounced [Wạ:Wạng:K̒:wie:Kā:rāmː]; Mon: ဘာဝင်္ကဝိဝေကာရာမ), or Wat Luang Pho Uttama (Thai: วัดหลวงพ่ออุตตมะ; Mon: ဘာကျာ်ဇၞော်အ္စာတၠဥတ္တမ), is a temple at Ban Wang Kalang. It was originally built in 1953 by Luang Pho Uttma with the help of a local immigrant population of Karen and Mon peoples. It is located in Sangkhlaburi District, Kanchanaburi, near the Thai-Burma border, 220 kilometers from Muang Kanchanaburi District.

It consisted only of a cloister and pavilion, and the villagers generally called it Luang Por Uttama Temple. It was located on a high hill in the Sam Phrai area, near three rivers, the Songkhaliar, the Beak, and the Rantee. In 1962 the Department of Religious Affairs authorized Wat Wang Wiwekaram, which is based on the district's original name, "Wang Ka."

The Electricity Generating Authority of Thailand built Khao Laem (or Vajiralongkorn) Dam in 1984. The water behind the dam threatened to flood the district, including the Mon village located there. Therefore, the temple was moved to a hill named Luang Pho Uttama, and 30 square metres (320 sq ft) of land per family was allocated to the villagers. The village has approximately 1,000 rai and the same number of residents who grow vegetables, fish, or work at a garment factory not far from the village.

The new Wat Wang Wiwekaram was completed in 1985, with built-in Mon and Thai architectural styles. Luang Por Uttama's body is kept there in a glass coffin. The sermon hall is a two-story concrete building; the ground floor is used for various merit-earning events. The upper floor is a museum that houses palm scriptures, ancient Mon scripts, images of the Buddha, ash statues, and various utensils.

The old temple site is now underwater and has become a tourist attraction known as Sangkhlaburi Underwater Temple.
