= Payathonzu =

Payathonzu ဍုင်ကျာ်ပိ
- Town
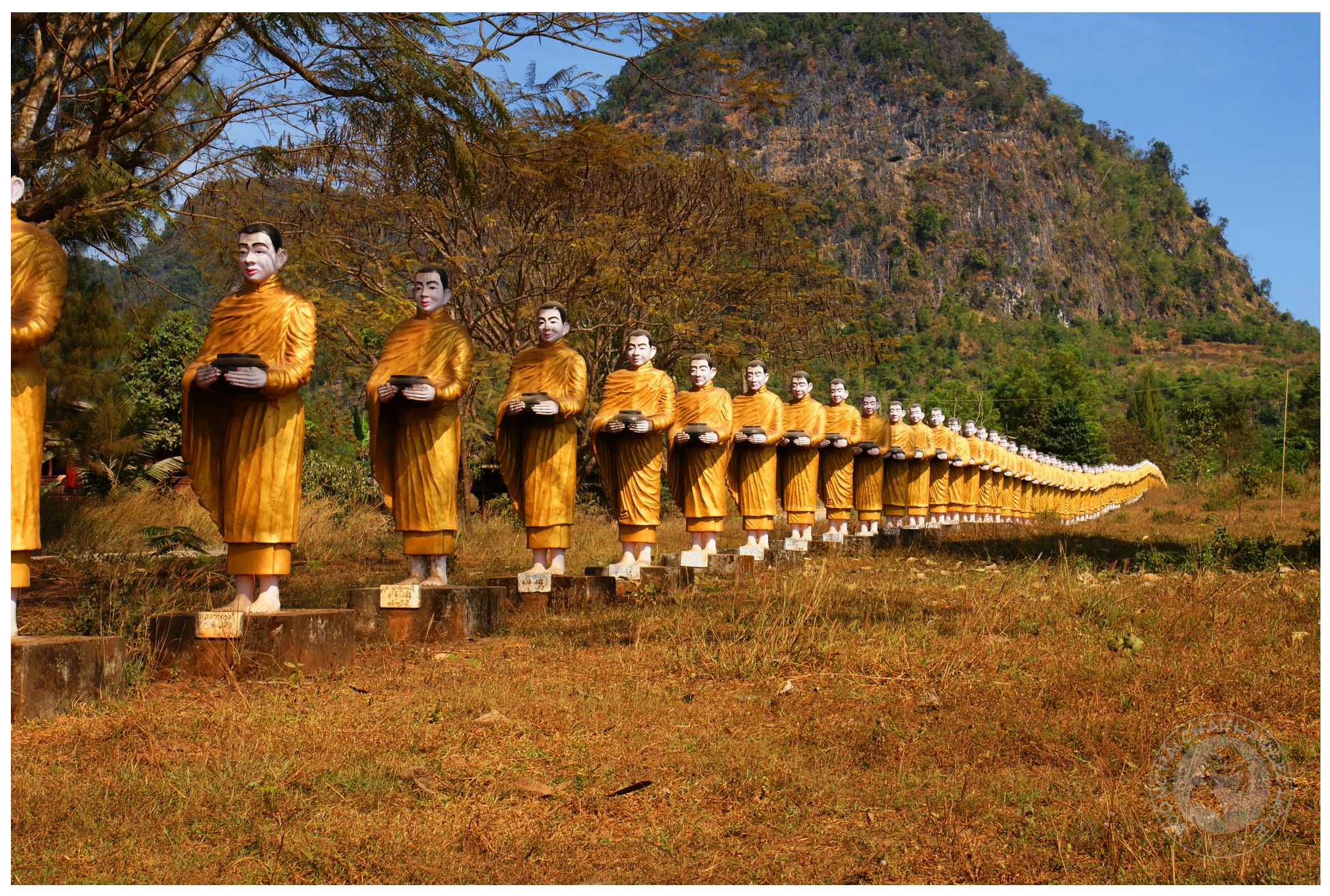
- Statues in Payathonzu

- Location in Burma
- Coordinates: 15°18′0″N 98°23′0″E
- Country: Myanmar
- Division: Kayin State
- District: Kawkareik District
- Township: Kyain Seikgyi Township
- Subtownship: Hpayarthonesu
- Elevation: 728 ft (222 m)

Population (2014)
  - Town: 27,311
  - Urban: 5,878
  - Rural: 21,433
  - Religions: Buddhism
- Time zone: UTC+6.30 (MST)
- Area code: း58

Phayathonezu (Pwo Eastern Karen: ကၠံင်သိုင့်ဖၠုံးဍုံ; Burmese: ဘုရားသုံးဆူမြို့; Mon: ဍုင်ကျာ်ပိ) is a town in the Karen State of south Myanmar, close to the border with Thailand. It is separated from the Thai border township of Nong Lu by the Three Pagodas Pass. It is also the administrative seat of Hpayarthonezu Sub-township (fourth-level administrative division of Myanmar) in Kyain Seikgyi Township, Kawkareik District of Kayin State in Myanmar.

== Overview ==
Payathonzu is home to Karen and Mon people. Separatist armies have been active in the town. Since 1990, it is under control of the Myanmar Army, however there is still occasional fighting in the area. In September 2023 it was reported that although the military still had a presence in the town, administrative and judicial affairs were largely under the control of the Karen National Union. Between 2023 and 2024, the KNU delegated the administration of the town to an anti-junta aligned Democratic Karen Benevolent Army (DKBA) group who maintains control and administers travel to and through Payathonzu as of December 2024.

The Tai Ta Ya monastery is located in the town, and features a long row of statues.

Payathonzu can be accessed from the Thai side via the Three Pagodas Pass. The border may not be open to foreign visitors.

== Camp Paya Thanzu Taung ==
Camp Paya Thanzu Taung (also Kilo 108)) was a prisoner of war camp during World War II on the Burma Railway. It was located about 500 metres north of the border. The first prisoners arrived in March 1943, and were mainly Dutch. Later, they were joined by British and Australian prisoners. The conditions were really bad with barely any food resulting in many deaths. After September 1943, the camp was used for maintenance of the rail road. The camp was abandoned in March 1944.
