= Mawkanin =

Ta maw kanin တၟအ်ကၞေၚ်
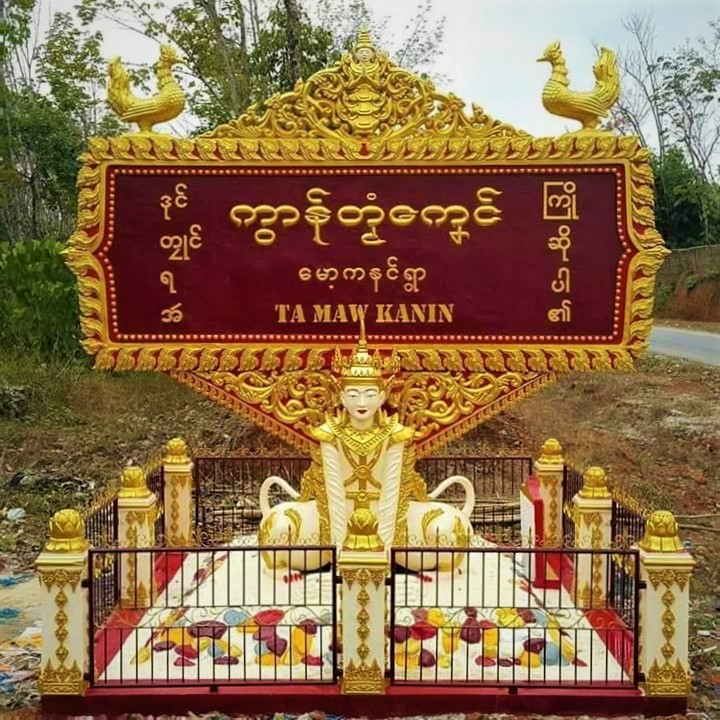

- Location in Burma
- Coordinates: 15°30′38″N 97°51′12″E
- Country: Burma (Myanmar)
- State: Mon State
- District: Mawlamyine District
- Township: Ye Township
- Elevation: 4.0 m (13 ft)

Population (2014 Census)
  - Total: 17,552
  - Ethnicities: Majority:Mons Minority:Burmans Karens
  - Religions: Theravada Buddhism
- Time zone: UTC+6.30 (MST)

Mawkanin (Burmese: မော့ကနင်; Mon: ကွာန်တၟံကၞေၚ်; also known as Ta Maw Kanin) is a large village in Ye Township in Mawlamyine District in the Mon State of southern Myanmar. Mawkanin is on the coastal plain, about 2 kilometres (1.2 mi) east of the town of Lamaing and about 18 miles (29 km) north of Ye.

== Geography ==
Mawkanin is located in the coastal plain and surrounded by Maw Ka Nin River along the north side. The elevation is from 13 to 75 feet (4.0 to 22.9 m) and the highest area is on the east side of the village.

== Populations ==
According to the Myanmar Census 2014 report, the population in Mawkanin is 17,552 which are 8,403 males and 9,149 females.

== Transport ==
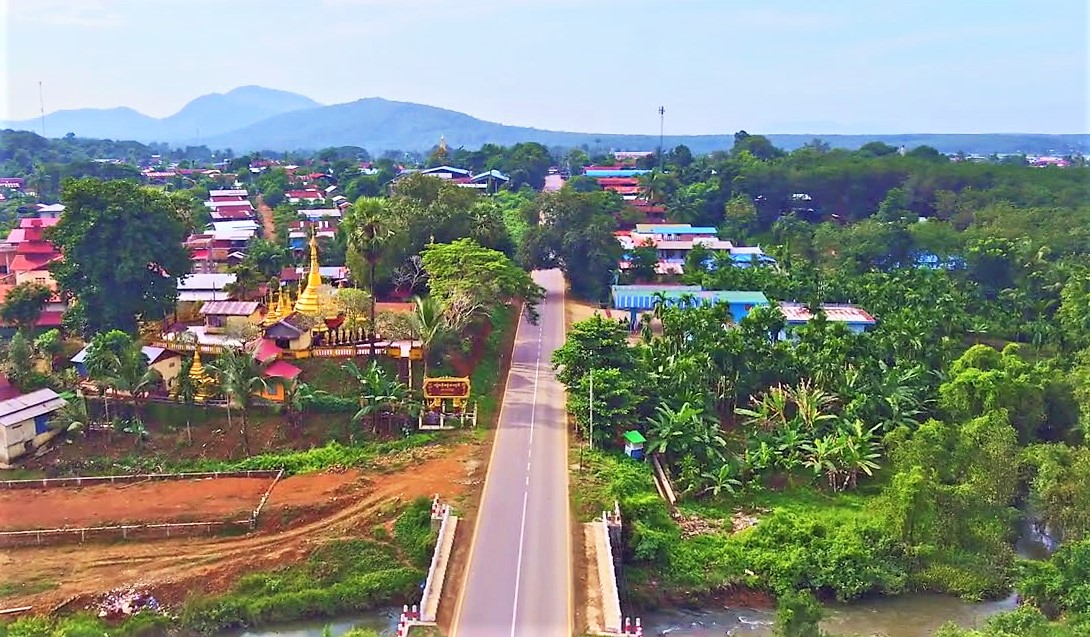
National Highway (Route 8)

Mawkanin lies on the National Highway 8 (Myanmar) which is connecting Thaton, Mawlamyine, Dawei, and Myeik and lt joins AH1 at Thaton. Mawkanin is about 120 km (75 mi) south of Mawlamyine city and 428 km (266 mi) southeast of Yangon city.

== Education ==
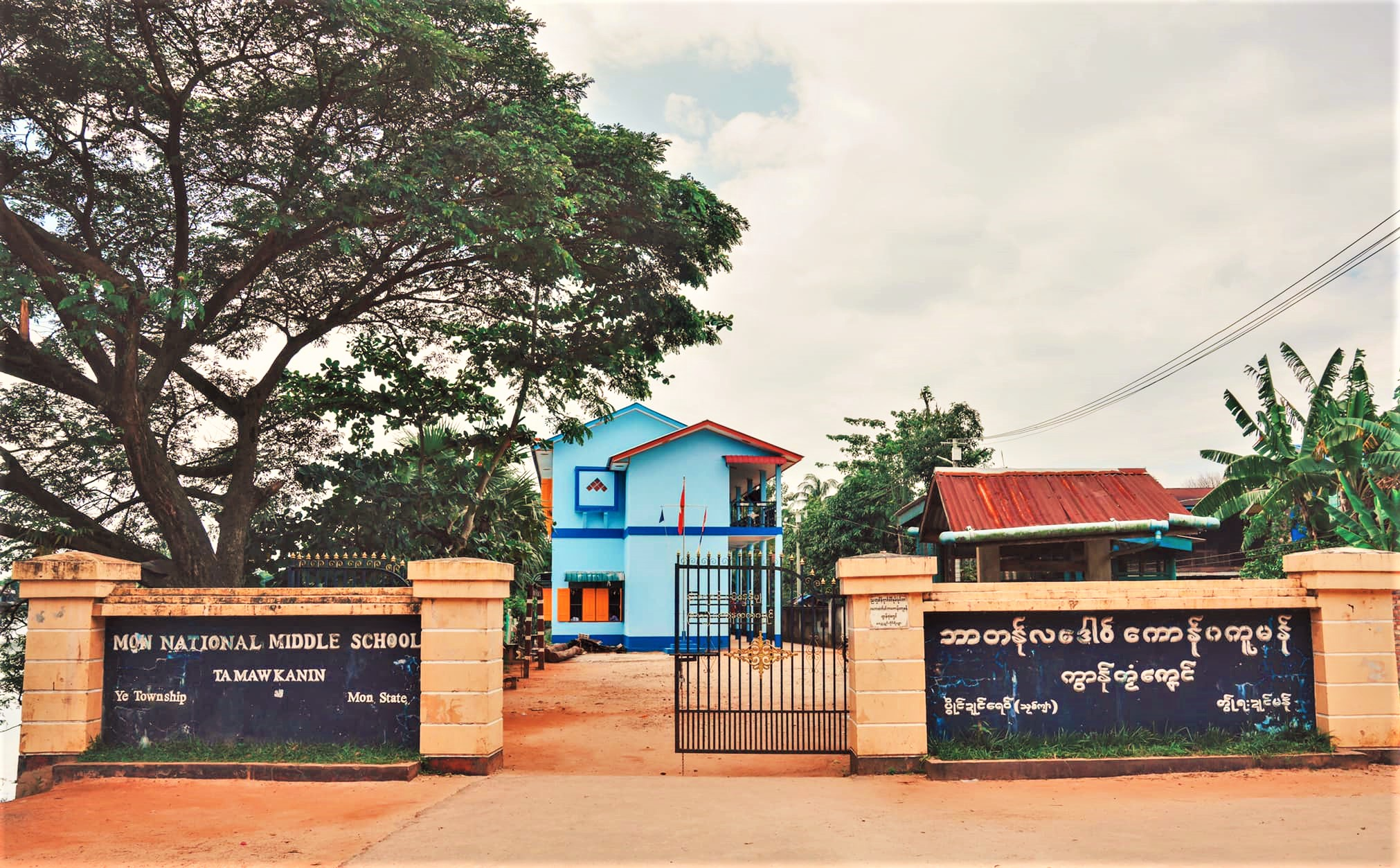
Mon National School

Mawkanin has four secondary schools and five primary schools.

- No.1 Basic Education High School(MawKanin)
- No.3 Basic Education Middle School(branch)(MawKanin)
- No.2 Basic Education Primary School(MawKanin)
- Mon National Middle School(MawKanin)
- Basic Education primary School(WaeTone)
- Basic Education primary School(KawZwe)
- Basic Education primary School(KawLaWae)
- Basic Education primary School(YwaTarYar)

== Places to visit ==
Mawkanin Pagoda is unique architecture and quite different from other pagoda statues usually seen around the country, and easy to access other towns and villages nearby and in Ye town from Mawkanin. The most popular places around the Mawkanin are Lamaing (Kyaik kay La Tha pagoda), Kyaik Dat Maw Brat (Poppawadi Village), Kawdut(Gwan stone beach), Kyaung Ywa Two Creek Resort, Ye Town, and Ka Byar Wa Beach.

== Climate ==
Mawkanin has a tropical monsoon climate (Köppen climate classification Am). Temperatures are hot throughout the year, although maximum temperatures in the monsoon months are depressed by heavy clouds and rain. There is a winter dry season (November–April) and a summer wet season (May–October). Torrential rain falls from June to September, with over 1,200 millimetres (47 in) falling in August alone.

Climate data for Mawkanin (1981–2010)
Month	Jan	Feb	Mar	Apr	May	Jun	Jul	Aug	Sep	Oct	Nov	Dec	Year
Mean daily maximum °C (°F)	32.9 (91.2)	33.8 (92.8)	34.8 (94.6)	35.1 (95.2)	32.6 (90.7)	30.0 (86.0)	29.3 (84.7)	28.8 (83.8)	30.4 (86.7)	32.1 (89.8)	32.9 (91.2)	32.4 (90.3)	32.1 (89.8)
Mean daily minimum °C (°F)	16.6 (61.9)	17.2 (63.0)	19.0 (66.2)	21.5 (70.7)	22.1 (71.8)	21.9 (71.4)	21.8 (71.2)	21.8 (71.2)	21.6 (70.9)	21.4 (70.5)	19.8 (67.6)	17.5 (63.5)	20.2 (68.4)
Average rainfall mm (inches)	3.2 (0.13)	16.8 (0.66)	24.0 (0.94)	84.9 (3.34)	528.9 (20.82)	1,111.3 (43.75)	1,171.6 (46.13)	1,320.5 (51.99)	687.9 (27.08)	285.3 (11.23)	57.0 (2.24)	23.7 (0.93)	5,315.1 (209.26)
Source: Norwegian Meteorological Institute

== Gallery ==
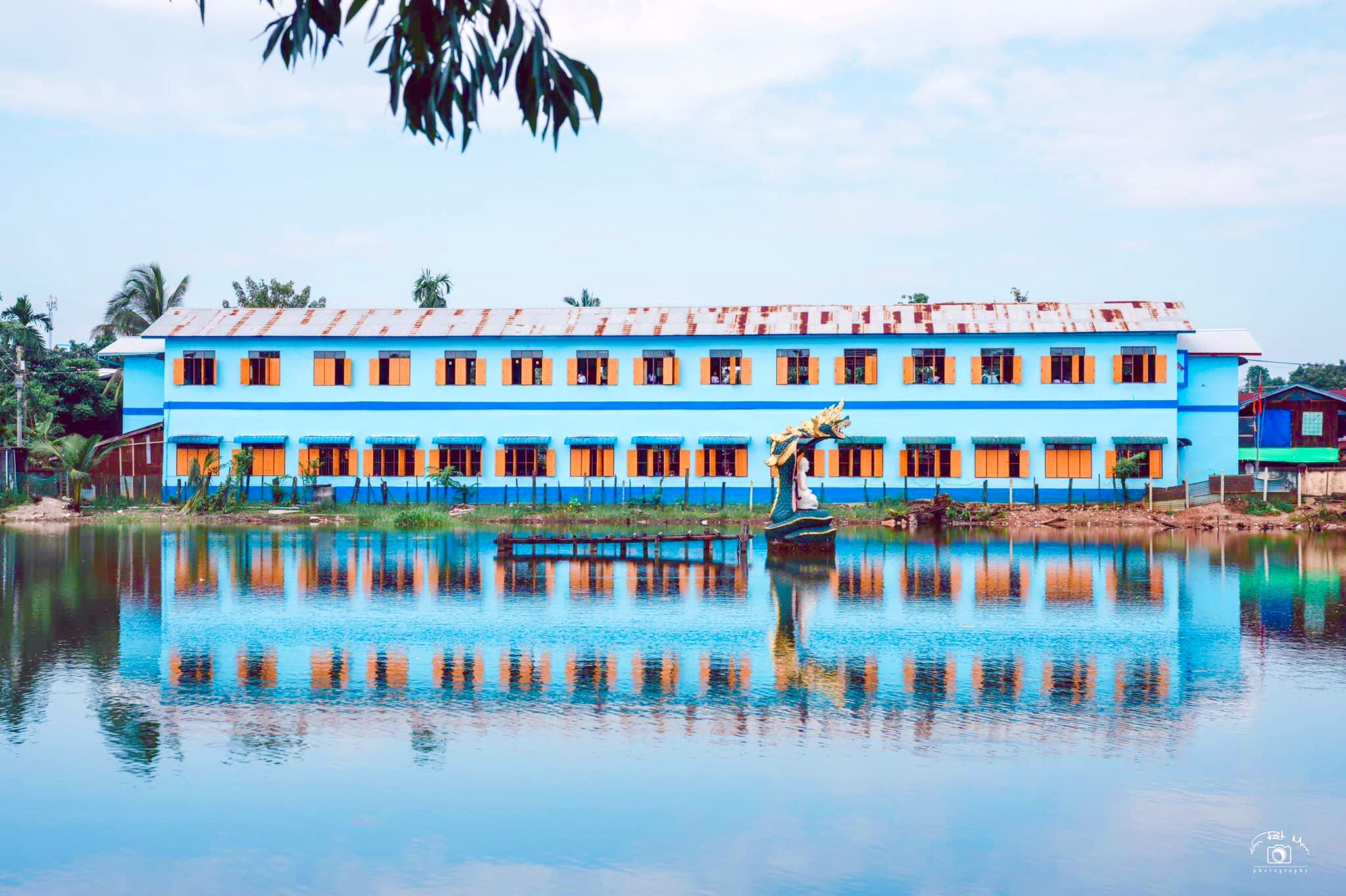
Mon National school(Mawkanin)

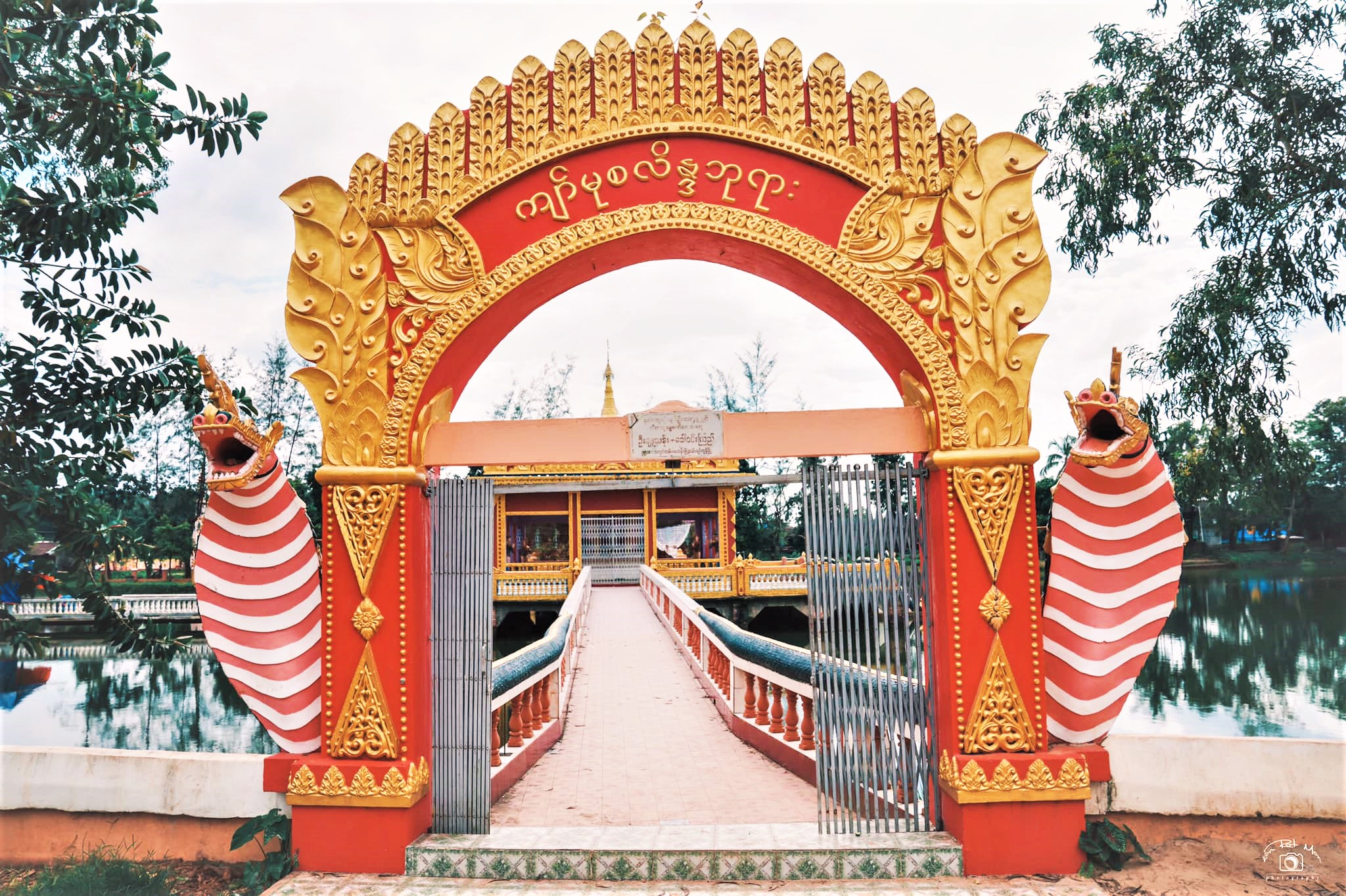
Ye Lae pagoda entrance

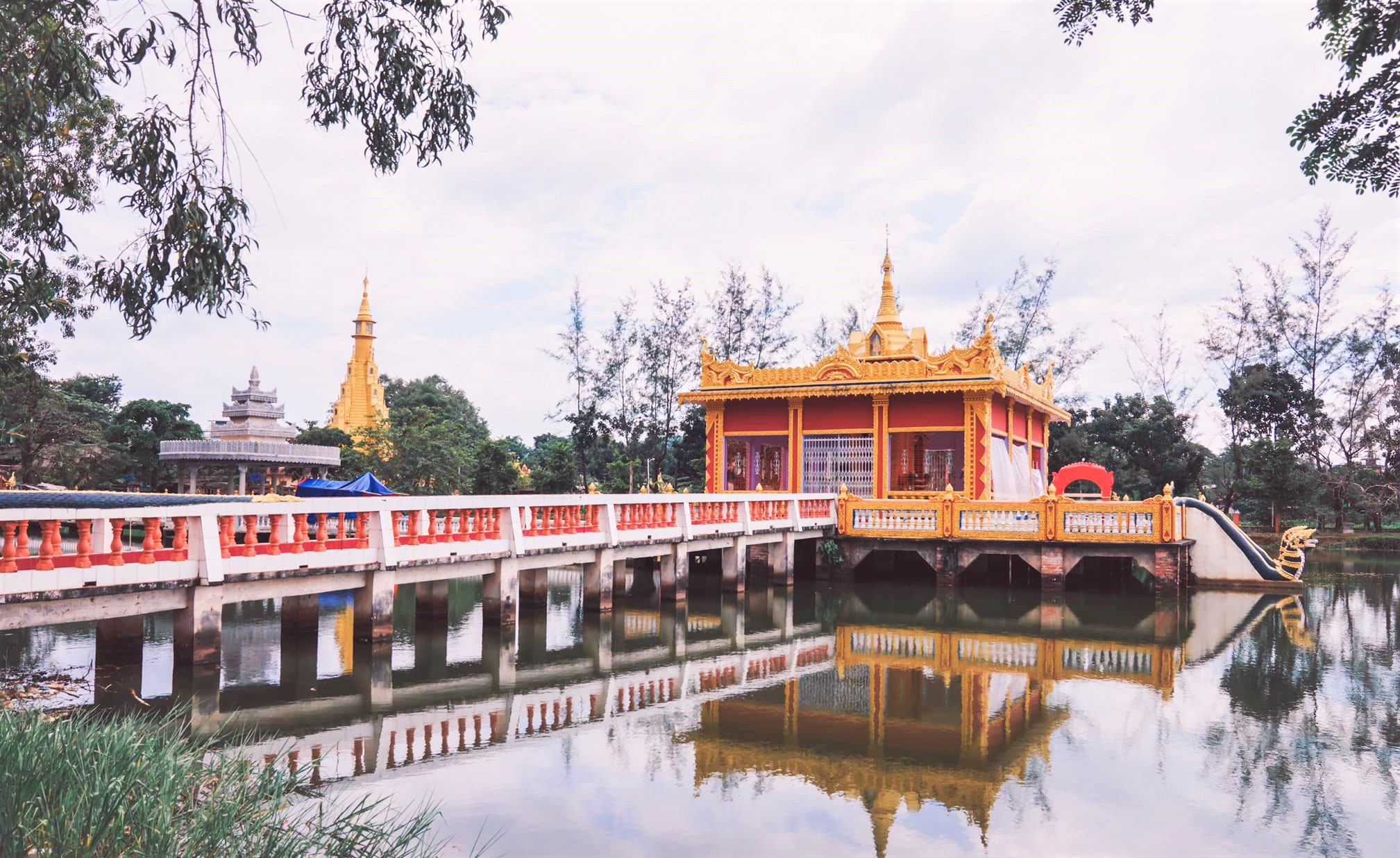
Ye Lae pagoda

== Notable Person ==
- Luangpho Uttama :First Mon Monk in Thailand who fled to Thailand in 1948, avoiding abuse during the civil war in Burma.
