= Luangpho Uttama =

Buddhist monk

Luang Pho Uttama
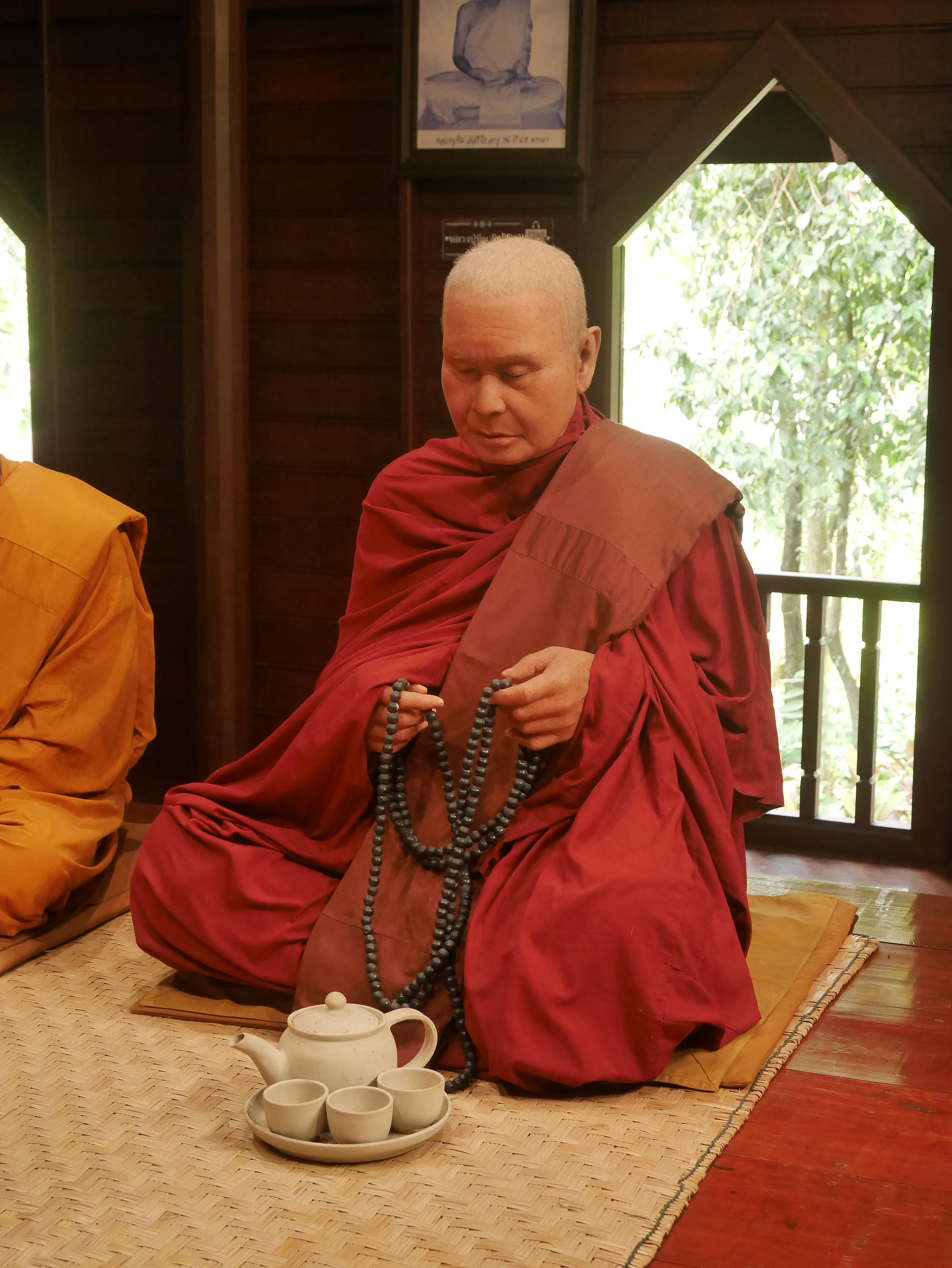

Personal life
- Born: A Maung; March 1910 Mawkanin, Moulmein, British Burma
- Died: 18 October 2006 (aged 96) Siriraj Hospital, Bangkok, Thailand
- Occupation: Buddhist monk

Religious life
- Religion: Buddhism
- School: Theravada
- Dharma names: Uttamarambho

Senior posting
- Based in: Wat Wang Wiwekaram, Thailand

Luangpho Ajahn Tala Uttama (Thai: หลวงพ่ออุตตมะ, Burmese: ဦးဥတ္တမ [ú oʊʔtəma̰]; Chinese: 龙婆乌达玛, alternatively spelt Luongphaw Ajar Tala Uttama, March 1910 in Mawkanin, Myanmar – 18 October 2006 in Bangkok, Thailand), was a Mon Buddhist monk. He was originally a Burmese citizen and later fled to Thailand and became one of Thailand's most admired and revered persons.

== Biography ==
Luangpho Uttama was born in Mawkanin, Ye township in British Burma (now part of Tanintharyi Region in southern Myanmar). He fled to Thailand in 1948, avoiding abuse during the civil war in Burma. He later lived in the area of Wengka, located near the Burmese-Thailand border, and settled in Thailand. During the year 1943, he was invited by Luang Pu Waen Suciṇṇo for sharing vipassana meditation experience to his disciple. In 1947, he was invited by Luang Phor Fan to teach Nat (spirit) in Thailand

He was known and revered by civilians, both Burmese and Thais, for his profound and intensive Buddhist teaching and industrious meditation. He founded Wat Wang Wiwekaram in Sangkhlaburi, Thailand and gave shelter to Mon refugees who fled from Burma. In 1997, he paid a formal visit to Myanmar, visited Yangon (Rangoon), and was honored with the title of Abhidhaja Agga Maha Saddhammajotika by Khin Nyunt, then Burmese prime minister.

His prosperity integrated in Thailand reaching to the regards of the Royal Thai family. In what will become Wat Wang Wiwekaram in 1978, Luangpho Uttama initiated the construction of a replica of the Bodh Gaya Pagoda, shaped the same as Mahabodhi Temple, situated in India. The pagoda was made from concrete, reaching 49 meters high. In 1989, Crown Prince Maha Vajiralongkorn attended auspiciously on occasion of invitation relics in Sri Lanka with a 600 g gold umbrella decorated on top of the pagoda.

Lastly, he was hospitalized with the patronage of Her Majesty Queen Sirikit and was paid a tribute on his funeral by the then premier of Thailand, General Surayud Chulanont.

== See also ==
- Sangkhlaburi, Kanchanaburi, Thailand
- Mon people
- Mon refugees
