= Songkalia River =

River in Thailand

Coordinates: 15.1411°N 98.4517°E

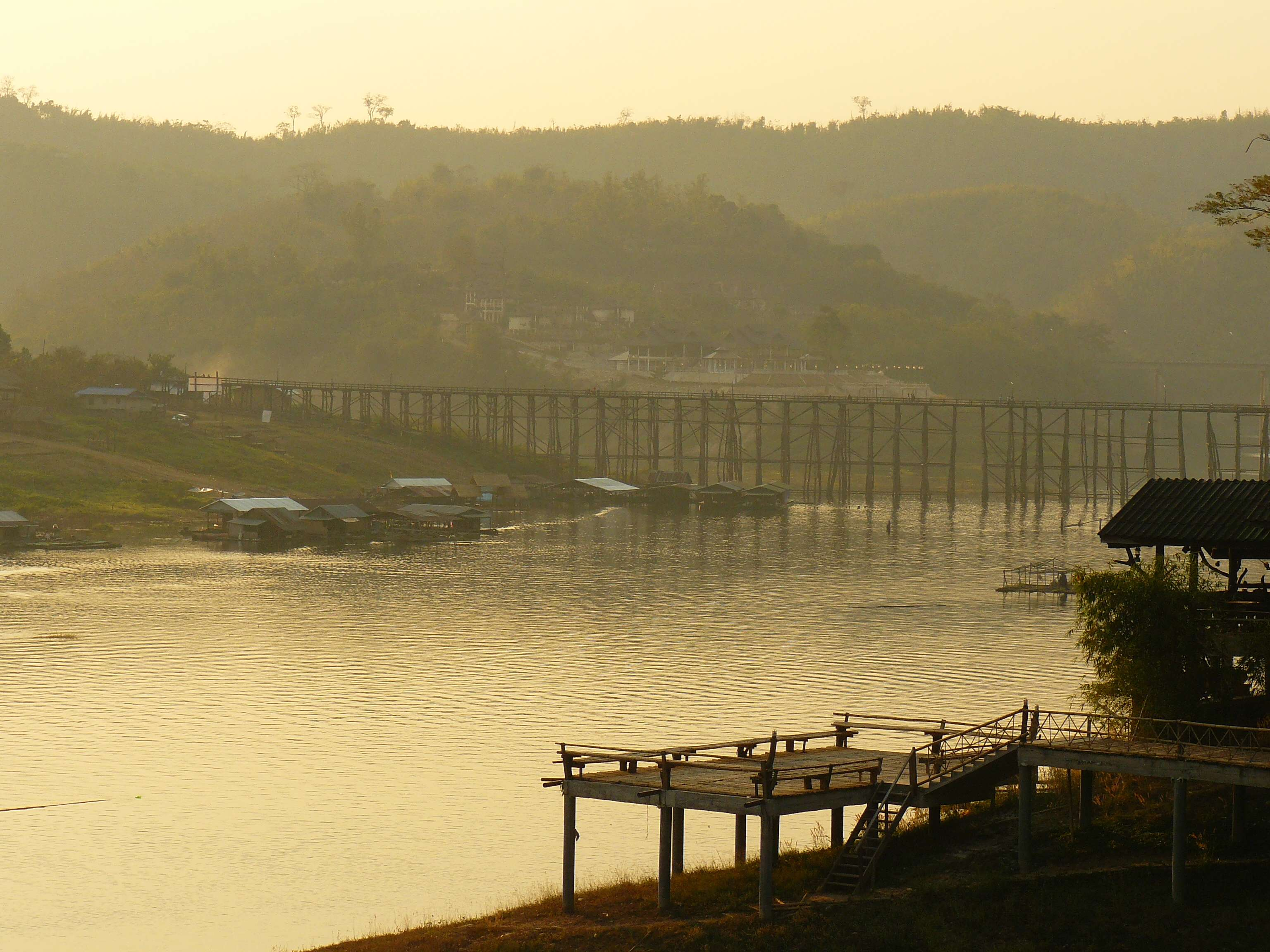
Songkalia River and Mon Bridge aka Uttamanusorn Bridge

Songkalia River (Thai: แม่น้ำซองกาเลีย, RTGS: Mae Nam Songkalia, pronounced [mɛ̂ː.nám sɔ̌ːŋ.kā.līa]) is a river in Kanchanaburi Province, Thailand. It combines with two other rivers, the Bikhli River and the Rantee River, at the confluence called Sam Sop or Sam Phrasop in Sangkhlaburi District to form the Khwae Noi River. "Song Ka Lia" in the Mon language means "over there".

It originates from Roki Creek in the forestland of Thung Yai Naresuan on the west side. It flows through a meander in many Karen communities and villages. It is now popular as a destination for kayakers from Songkalia Bridge to Mon Bridge.
