= Sangkhla Buri district =

Sangkhla Buri สังขละบุรี
- District
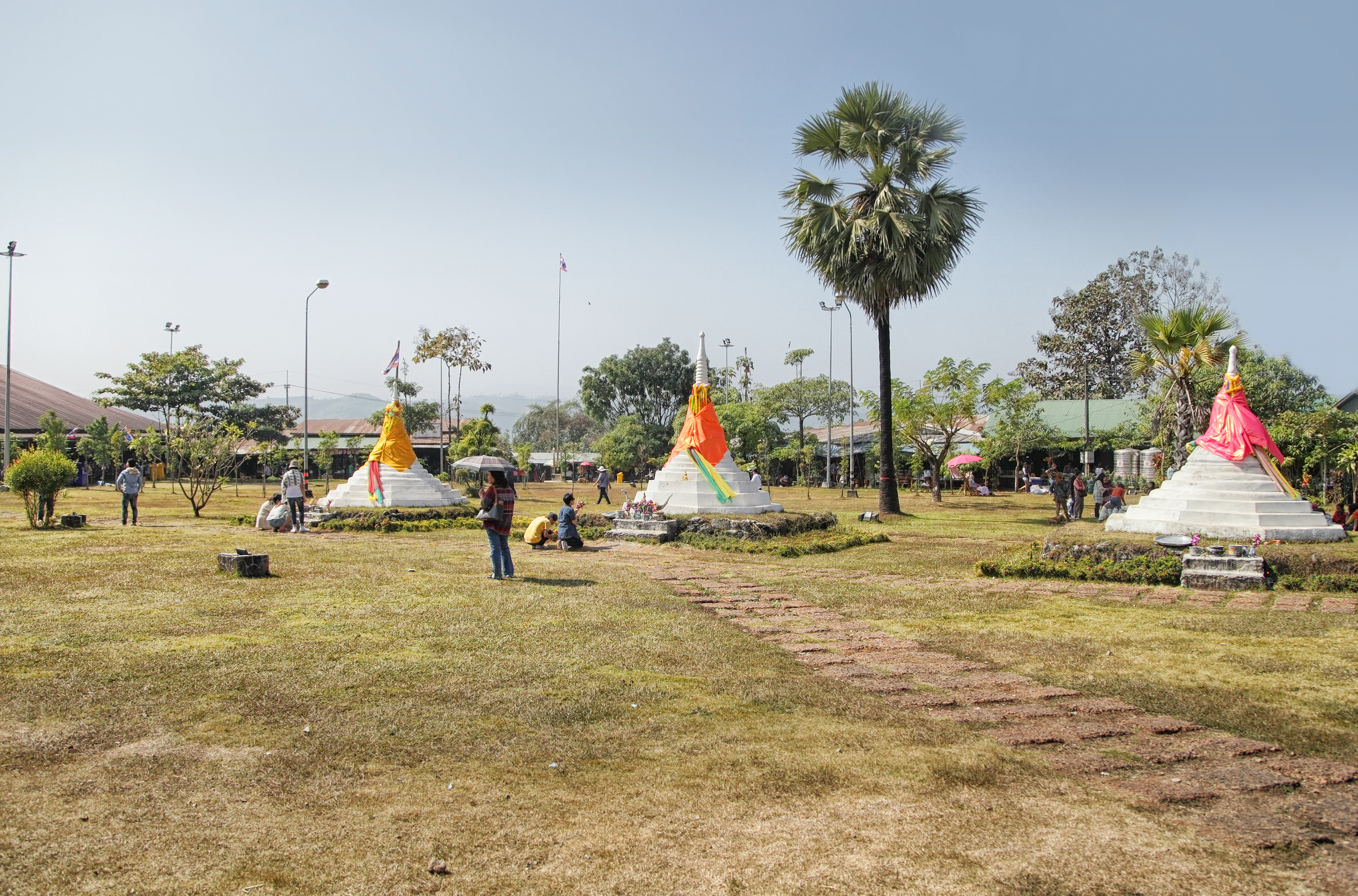
- Three Pagodas Pass

- District location in Kanchanaburi province
- Coordinates: 15°9′20″N 98°27′12″E
- Country: Thailand
- Province: Kanchanaburi
- Seat: Nong Lu

Area
  - Total: 3,349 km^{2} (1,293 sq mi)

Population (2024)
  - Total: 54,459
  - Density: 16/km^{2} (41/sq mi)
- Time zone: UTC+7 (ICT)
- Postal code: 71240
- Calling code: 034
- ISO 3166 code: TH-7108

Sangkhla Buri (Thai: สังขละบุรี, pronounced [sǎŋ.kʰlàʔ bū.rīː], Mon: ဝင်္က,pronounced [liəŋka]) is a district (amphoe) in the northern part of Kanchanaburi province in western Thailand.

== History ==
In 1939 the district Wang Ka (วังกะ) was renamed Sangkhla Buri, which was previously the name of the minor district Thong Pha Phum. On 20 May 1941 the district was downgraded to a minor district (king amphoe) and made a subordinate of Thong Pha Phum District. It then consisted of the four tambons: Nong Lu, Prangphle, Laiwo, and Lang Phu Sa It was again upgraded to full district status on 27 July 1965.

== Geography ==
Sangkhla Buri is the northernmost district of Kanchanaburi province, on the border with Myanmar. Three Pagodas Pass is the border crossing station to Myanmar. Neighboring jurisdictions are (from the west clockwise) Tanintharyi Region, Mon State and Kayin State of Myanmar, Umphang district of Tak province, and Thong Pha Phum district of Kanchanaburi.

A large part of the district is covered by the Khao Laem Reservoir, an artificial lake formed by the Vajiralongkorn Dam on the Khwae Noi River. The northern part of the district is in the area of Thung Yai Naresuan Wildlife Sanctuary, which — together with the adjoining Huai Kha Khaeng Wildlife Sanctuary — constitutes the Western Forest Complex — the largest contiguous protected area in mainland Southeast Asia.

== Administration ==
=== Provincial administration ===
The district is divided into three subdistricts (tambons), which are further subdivided into 21 administrative villages (mubans).

| No. | Subdistrict | Thai | Villages | Pop. |
|---|---|---|---|---|
| 1. | Nong Lu | หนองลู | 11 | 40,868 |
| 2. | Prang Phle | ปรังเผล | 4 | 6,878 |
| 3. | Laiwo | ไล่โว่ | 8 | 6,713 |
| | | Total | 21 | 54,459 |

=== Local government ===
==== Municipality ====
As of December 2024 there is: Wang Ka subdistrict municipality (thesaban tambon) which covers parts of Nong Lu subdistrict.

| Wang Ka subdistrict mun. | Pop. | 05710801 | wangka.go.th |
| Nong Lu | 9,769 | | |

==== Subdistrict administrative organizations ====
The non-municipal areas are administered by three subdistrict administrative organizations - SAO (ongkan borihan suan tambon - o bo toh).

| Subdistrict adm.org - SAO | Pop. | LAO code | website |
|---|---|---|---|
| Nong Lu SAO | 31,099 | 06710804 | hnongloo.go.th |
| Prang Phlo SAO | 6,878 | 06710802 | prungphlae.go.th |
| Laiwo SAO | 6,713 | 06710803 | laiwo.go.th |

== Education ==
- 20 primary schools
- 2 secondary schools

== Healthcare ==
=== Hospitals ===
Sangkhla Buri district is served by two hospitals

- Sangkhla Buri Hospital with 61 beds.
- Christian Hospital of the Sangkhla Buri Christian Center with 30 beds.

=== Health promoting hospitals ===
In the district there are six health-promoting hospitals in total.

| 1 Laiwo | 1 Prang Phlo | 4 Nong Lu |

== Religion ==
There are eighteen Theravada Buddhist temples in the district.

| 3 Laiwo | 7 Prang Phlo | 8 Nong Lu |

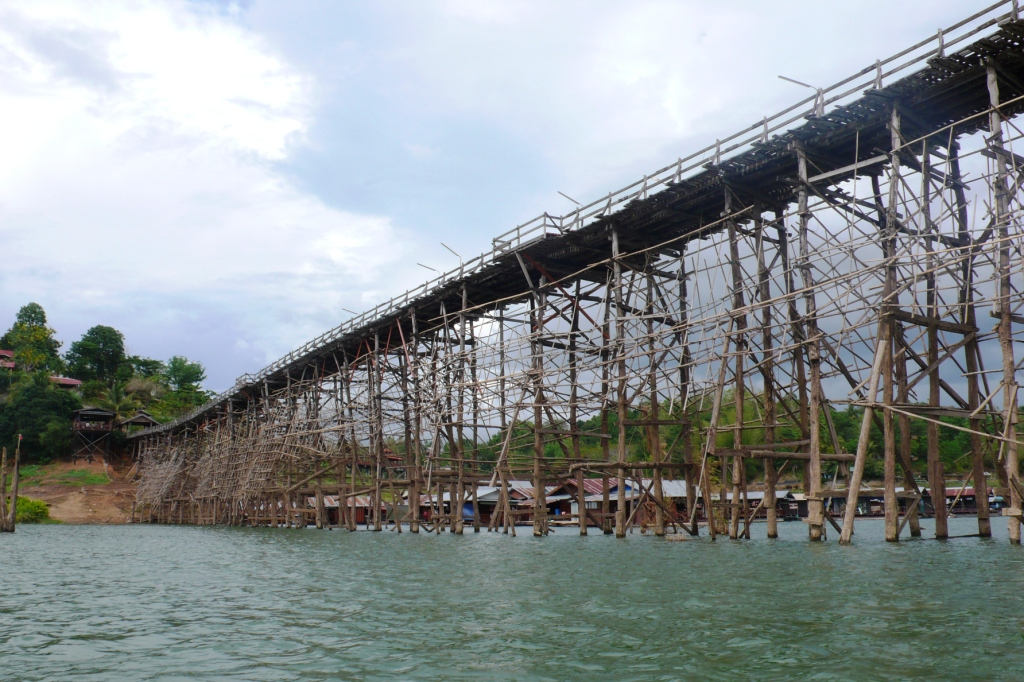
Mon Bridge

The Christians have fifteen churches and muslims have one mosque.

== Uttamanusorn Bridge ==
A 2014 Bangkok Post article said that the "Uttamanusorn Bridge, better known as Saphan Mon,...built almost 30 years ago by the people, for the people of Ban Wangka, a Mon village" is the most popular tourist landmark in the district".
