= Three Pagodas Pass =

Mountain pass between Myanmar and Thailand

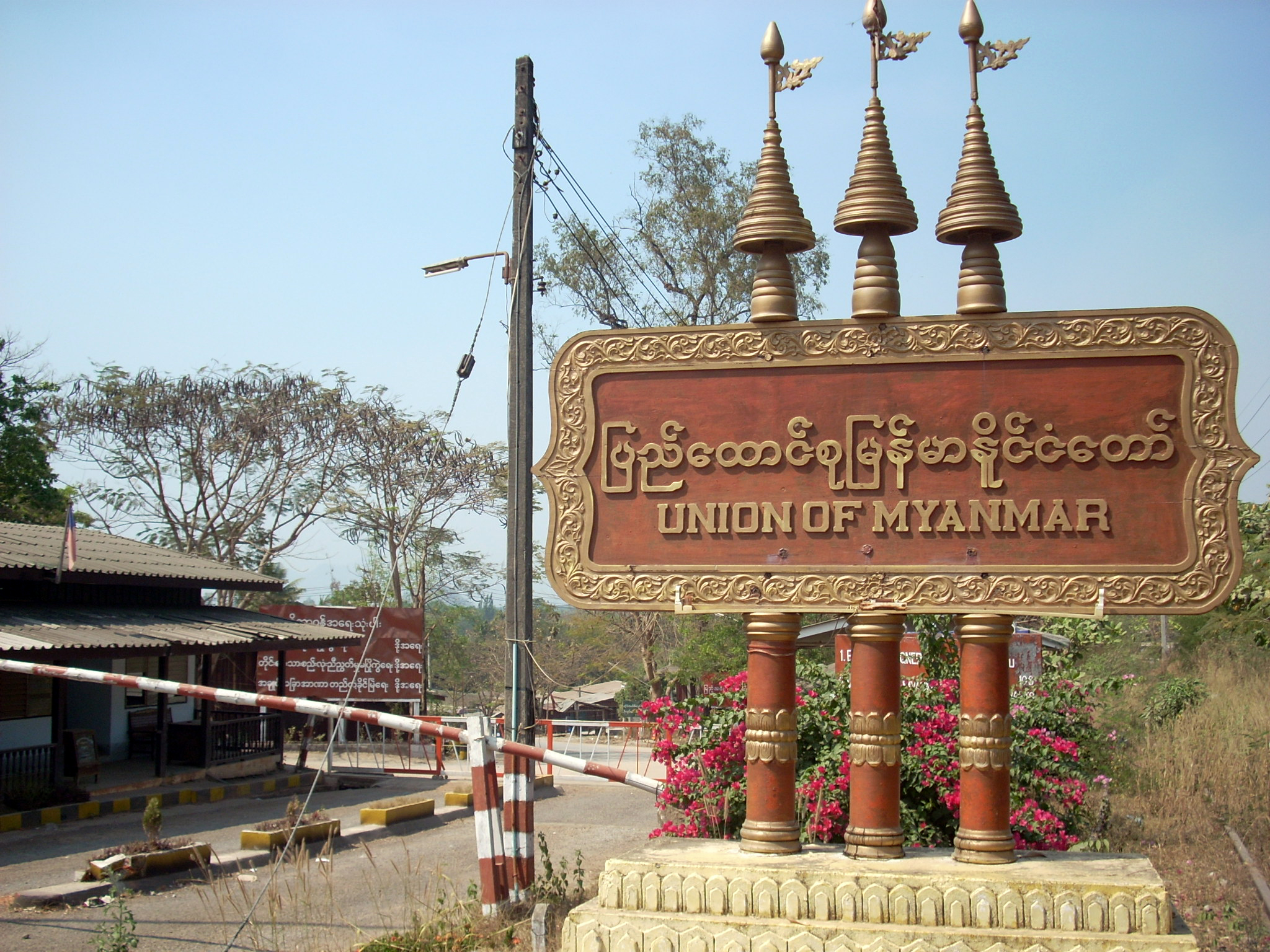
- Myanmar–Thailand border checkpoint at Three Pagodas Pass.

- Location within Thailand
- Elevation: 282 metres (925 ft)

Third Approach
- Location: Myanmar–Thailand border
- Range: Tenasserim Hills
- Coordinates: 15°18′6″N 98°24′7″E

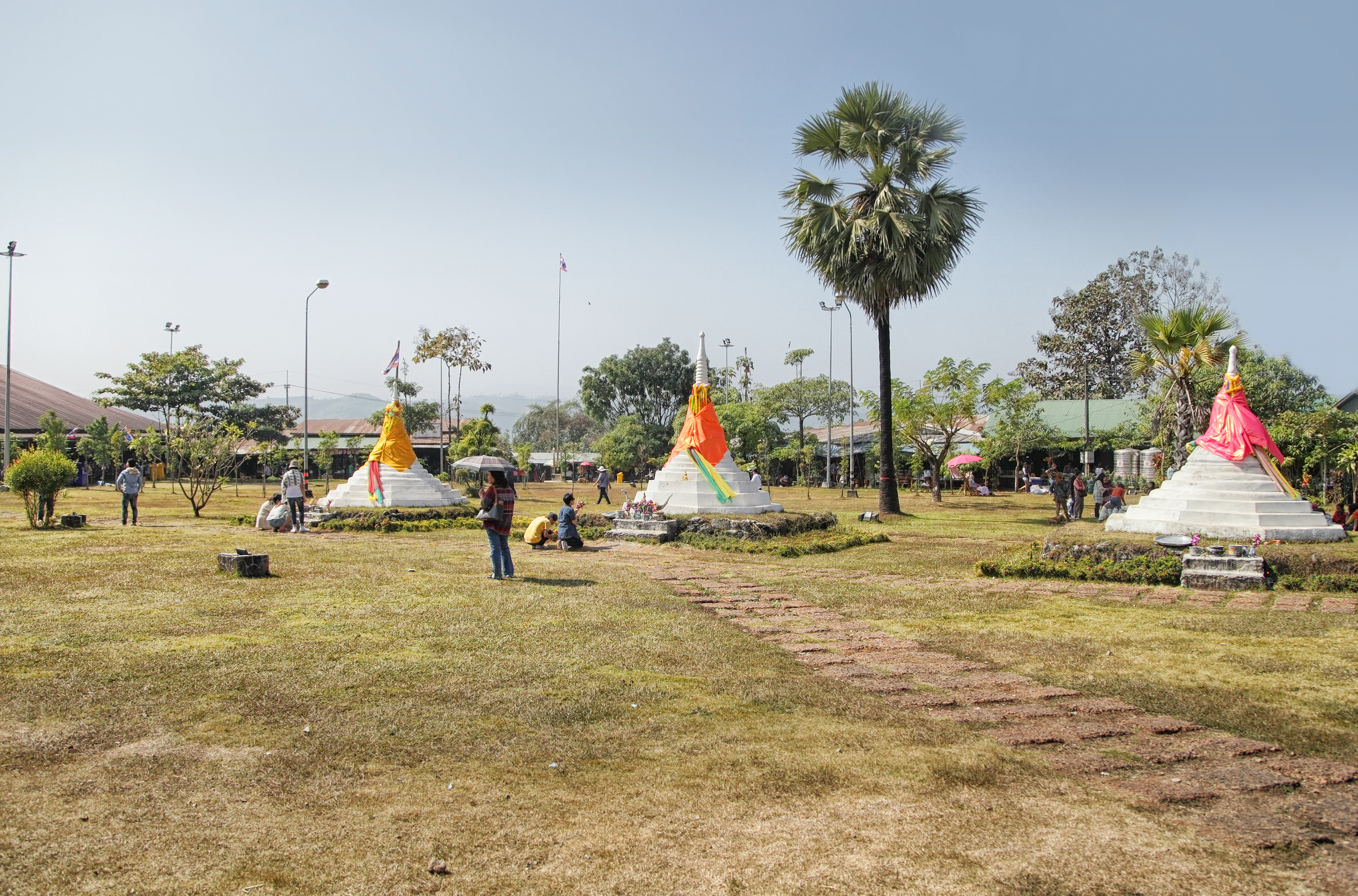
The Three Pagodas

Three Pagodas Pass (Phlone ကၠံင်သိုင့်ဖၠုံးလါင့်ဆေါတ်ဖိုင်သာ့; Burmese: ဘုရားသုံးဆူ တောင်ကြားလမ်း, Paya Thon Zu Taung Za Lang, Burmese pronunciation: [pʰajá θóʊɰ̃ zù tàʊɰ̃ dʑá láɰ̃]; Thai: ด่านเจดีย์สามองค์, RTGS: Dan Chedi Sam Ong, Thai pronunciation: [dàːn tɕeːdiː sǎːm ʔoŋ]) is a pass in the Tenasserim Hills on the border between Thailand and Myanmar (Burma), at an elevation of 282 metres (925 ft). The pass links the town of Nong Lu in the north of Kanchanaburi Province, Thailand, to the town of Payathonzu in the south of Kayin State, Myanmar.

== Etymology ==
The pass is named after three small, crumbling stupas or chedis which were probably built at the end of Ayutthaya period as a symbol of peace. The pagodas are now on the Thai side of the border in the village of Phra Chedi Sam Ong. Parts of the border are still disputed. These three chedis appear in the provincial seal of Kanchanaburi Province in stylized form. The pass gives its name to the Three Pagodas Fault.

== History ==
The pass has been the main land route into western Thailand since ancient times. It is one of the few passes in the Tenasserim Hills.

The pass is named after three pagodas erected in 1929 by Phra Sri Suwan Khiri, the ruler of Sangkhla Buri, with the assistance of local villagers, and has reputedly served as a route for Indian monks in the 3rd century to disseminate Buddhism in Thailand.

During the Ayutthaya period in Thai history (14th–18th centuries), the pass was the main invasion route for the Burmese, but at times was also used against them by Siamese armies. The first Burmese invasion through the pass occurred in 1548 during the Burmese–Siamese War (1547–1549).

During World War II, Japan built the infamous Death Railway (officially Taimen – Rensetsu Tetsudo) through the pass. There is a memorial to commemorate the thousands of British, Australian, Dutch and American prisoners of war, and Asian forced labourers who died during the construction of the railway.

The region is home to several hill tribes, including Karens and Mons, who are unable or unwilling to obtain citizenship from either country. Separatist armies have repeatedly tried to seize the pass from Myanmar, with the Mons in effective control until 1990, when Burmese troops regained it. There is still occasional fighting in the area.

== Tourism ==
Three Pagodas Pass is popular with tourists, who are allowed to obtain a one-day visa from the Thai side to visit Payathonsu. Attractions on the Burmese side include wooden furniture, jade carvings, and textiles. Thai tourists are allowed in as of 2011, while other tourists are not, due to its status as a temporary border checkpoint which only allows day trips between the two neighbouring countries.

== Festivals ==
With the rambling strutting roosters of the Buddhist temple of Wat Suwankhiri on a Payathonsu cliff near by, during April, Three Pagodas Pass becomes a site of the Songkran Festival with cockfights, Burmese kickboxing and various folk dancing.
